= List of 2020–21 Super Rugby AU transfers =

This is a list of player movements for Super Rugby teams prior to the end of the 2021 Super Rugby AU season. Departure and arrivals of all players that were included in a Super Rugby squad for 2020 or 2021 are listed here, regardless of when it occurred. Future-dated transfers are only included if confirmed by the player or his agent, his former team or his new team.

Notes

- 2020 players listed are all players that were named in the initial senior squad, or subsequently included in a 23-man match day squad at any game during the season.
- (did not play) denotes that a player did not play at all during one of the two seasons due to injury or non-selection. These players are included to indicate they were contracted to the team. For the 2020 season, Super Rugby was suspended after 7 rounds of matches due to the COVID-19 pandemic, with regional tournaments taking place there after. Players listed as 'did not play' did not feature in any of the 7 rounds of matches played that season. For the 2021 season, players listed as 'did not play' did not feature in any of the Super Rugby AU or Super Rugby Trans-Tasman fixtures that season.
- (short-term) denotes that a player wasn't initially contracted, but came in during the season. This could either be a club rugby player coming in as injury cover, or a player whose contract had expired at another team (typically in the northern hemisphere).
- Flags are only shown for players moving to or from another country.
- Players may play in several positions, but are listed in only one.

== Brumbies ==
Brumbies transfers 2020–2021
Pos	2020 squad	Out	In	2021 players
PR	Allan Alaalatoa; Harry Lloyd; Tom Ross; Scott Sio; James Slipper; Shambeckler Vui (did not play)	(substituted off) Shambeckler Vui (to (Japan) Mitsubishi DynaBoars)	(substituted in) Archer Holz (from Eastern Suburbs); (substituted in) Fred Kaihea (from Queanbeyan Whites); (substituted in) Sefo Kautai (from (New Zealand) Waikato)	Allan Alaalatoa; Archer Holz; Fred Kaihea (short-term); Sefo Kautai (short-term); Harry Lloyd; Tom Ross; Scott Sio; James Slipper
HK	Folau Fainga'a; Lachlan Lonergan; Connal McInerney		(substituted in) Billy Pollard (from Uni-Norths Owls)	Folau Fainga'a; Lachlan Lonergan; Connal McInerney; Billy Pollard
LK	Murray Douglas; Blake Enever (did not play); Nick Frost; Cadeyrn Neville; Darcy Swain	(substituted off) Murray Douglas (to (Japan) Yamaha Júbilo); (substituted off) Blake Enever (to (England) Leicester Tigers)	(substituted in) Tom Hooper (from Tuggeranong Vikings); (substituted in) James Tucker (from (New Zealand) Blues)	Nick Frost; Tom Hooper; Cadeyrn Neville; Darcy Swain; James Tucker
FL	Jahrome Brown (did not play); Tom Cusack; Will Miller; Rob Valetini		(substituted in) Luke Reimer (from Wests Lions); (substituted in) Rory Scott (from Canberra Royals); (substituted in) Henry Stowers (from Force)	Jahrome Brown; Tom Cusack; Will Miller (short-term); Luke Reimer; Rory Scott; Henry Stowers (short-term); Rob Valetini
N8	Lachlan McCaffrey; Pete Samu	(substituted off) Lachlan McCaffrey (to (Japan) Kyuden Voltex)		Pete Samu
SH	Issak Fines (did not play); Ryan Lonergan; Joe Powell	(substituted off) Joe Powell (to Rebels)	(substituted in) Lachlan Albert (from Wests Lions); (substituted in) Nic White (from (England) Exeter Chiefs)	Lachlan Albert (did not play); Issak Fines; Ryan Lonergan; Nic White
FH	Bayley Kuenzle; Noah Lolesio; Reesjan Pasitoa			Bayley Kuenzle; Noah Lolesio; Reesjan Pasitoa
CE	Len Ikitau; Tevita Kuridrani; Guy Porter (did not play); Irae Simone	(substituted off) Tevita Kuridrani (to Force); (substituted off) Guy Porter (to (England) Leicester Tigers)	(substituted in) Reece Tapine (from Norths)	Len Ikitau; Irae Simone; Reece Tapine (did not play)
WG	Solomone Kata; Andy Muirhead; Toni Pulu; Tom Wright	(substituted off) Toni Pulu (to Force)		Solomone Kata; Andy Muirhead; Tom Wright
FB	Tom Banks; Mack Hansen (did not play)			Tom Banks; Mack Hansen
Coach	Dan McKellar			Dan McKellar

== Force ==
In May 2020, the Western Force were confirmed in the 2020 Super Rugby AU tournament to supplement the suspended 2020 Super Rugby season. In November 2020, they were confirmed in the tournament for the 2021 season also. All players were named in the Force squad for the 2020 Global Rapid Rugby season or the 2020 Super Rugby AU season unless stated.

Force transfers 2020–2021
Pos	2020 squad	Out	In	2021 squad
PR	—N/a	—N/a	(substituted in) Bo Abra (from Eastern Suburbs); (substituted in) Santiago Medrano (from (Argentina) Jaguares); (substituted in) Tom Robertson (from Waratahs)	Bo Abra (wider training squad, did not play); Victor Harris (wider training squad, did not play); Chris Heiberg (did not play); Greg Holmes; Kieran Longbottom; Santiago Medrano; Tom Robertson; Angus Wagner
HK	—N/a	—N/a	(substituted in) Jack Winchester (from Bond University)	Feleti Kaitu'u; Andrew Ready; Jack Winchester
LK	—N/a	—N/a	(substituted in) Ryan McCauley (from Waratahs); (substituted in) Sitaleki Timani (from (France) Clermont)	Fergus Lee-Warner; Ryan McCauley; Jackson Pugh (wider training squad, did not play); Jeremy Thrush; Sitaleki Timani (short-term)
FL	—N/a	—N/a	(substituted in) Tim Anstee (from Australia Sevens); (substituted in) Tomás Lezana (from (Argentina) Jaguares)	Tim Anstee; Ollie Callan (wider training squad); Kane Koteka; Tomás Lezana
N8	—N/a	—N/a		Brynard Stander
SH	—N/a	—N/a	(substituted in) Tomás Cubelli (from (Argentina) Jaguares); (substituted in) Michael McDonald (from Waratahs)	Tomás Cubelli; Michael McDonald (wider training squad); Ian Prior
FH	—N/a	—N/a	(substituted in) Jake McIntyre (from (France) Clermont); (substituted in) Domingo Miotti (from (Argentina) Jaguares)	Jono Lance; Jake McIntyre; Domingo Miotti
CE	—N/a	—N/a	(substituted in) Tevita Kuridrani (from Brumbies); (substituted in) Jordan Olowofela (from (England) Leicester Tigers)	Kyle Godwin; Richard Kahui; Tevita Kuridrani; Grason Makara (wider training squad, did not play); Jordan Olowofela (short-term); Henry Taefu
WG	—N/a	—N/a	(substituted in) Toni Pulu (from Brumbies)	Marcel Brache; Brad Lacey (did not play); Jonah Placid (did not play); Toni Pulu; Byron Ralston
FB	—N/a	—N/a	(substituted in) Rob Kearney (from (Ireland) Leinster)	Rob Kearney; Jack McGregor; Jake Strachan
Coach	—N/a	—N/a		Tim Sampson

== Rebels ==
Rebels transfers 2020–2021
Pos	2020 squad	Out	In	2021 players
PR	Jermaine Ainsley; Cabous Eloff (development squad); Mees Erasmus (did not play); Pone Fa'amausili (did not play); Matt Gibbon; Cameron Orr; Fereti Sa'aga; Ruan Smith	(substituted off) Jermaine Ainsley (to (New Zealand) Highlanders); (substituted off) Mees Erasmus (to (France) Valence-d'Agen); (substituted off) Fereti Sa'aga (retired); (substituted off) Ruan Smith (to (United States) LA Giltinis)	(substituted in) Albert Anae (from University of Queensland); (substituted in) Isaac Aedo Kailea (from University of Queensland); (substituted in) Lucio Sordoni (from (Argentina) Jaguares); (substituted in) Rhys van Nek (from Easts Tigers)	Albert Anae; Cabous Eloff; Pone Fa'amausili; Matt Gibbon; Isaac Aedo Kailea (development squad); Cameron Orr; Lucio Sordoni; Rhys van Nek
HK	Steven Misa (short-term); Declan Moore (development squad, did not play); Anaru Rangi; Jordan Uelese	(substituted off) Steven Misa (to (New Zealand) Waikato); (substituted off) Declan Moore (to Sydney University); (substituted off) Anaru Rangi (to NTT Shining Arcs)	(substituted in) Ed Craig (from Reds); (substituted in) James Hanson (from (England) Gloucester)	Ed Craig; James Hanson; Jordan Uelese
LK	Esei Ha'angana (did not play); Ross Haylett-Petty; Trevor Hosea (did not play); Gideon Koegelenberg; Matt Philip	(substituted off) Esei Ha'angana (to (Japan) Panasonic Wild Knights); (substituted off) Gideon Koegelenberg (to (Japan) Kurita Water Gush); (substituted off) Matt Philip (to (France) Pau)	(substituted in) Ignacio Calas (from (Argentina) Jaguares); (substituted in) Steve Cummins (from (France) Pau); (substituted in) Tom Nowlan (from Randwick)	Ignacio Calas (did not play); Steve Cummins; Ross Haylett-Petty; Trevor Hosea; Tom Nowlan (short-term)
FL	Angus Cottrell; Richard Hardwick; Luke Jones; Josh Kemeny (did not play); Boyd Killingworth (did not play); Rob Leota; Michael Wells; Brad Wilkin (did not play)	(substituted off) Angus Cottrell (to (United States) LA Giltinis); (substituted off) Luke Jones (to (France) Racing 92); (substituted off) Boyd Killingworth (to Warringah)	(substituted in) Jeral Skelton (from Australia Sevens)	Richard Hardwick; Josh Kemeny; Rob Leota; Jeral Skelton; Michael Wells; Brad Wilkin
N8	Isi Naisarani		(substituted in) Michael Icely (from Eastwood)	Michael Icely (short-term); Isi Naisarani
SH	Frank Lomani; Ryan Louwrens; Theo Strang (short-term); James Tuttle (did not play)	(substituted off) Ryan Louwrens (to (Japan) Kintetsu Liners)	(substituted in) Joe Powell (from Brumbies)	Frank Lomani; Joe Powell; Theo Strang (did not play); James Tuttle
FH	Andrew Deegan; Matt To'omua	(substituted off) Andrew Deegan (to (Japan) Kurita Water Gush)	(substituted in) Carter Gordon (from Reds)	Carter Gordon; Matt To'omua
CE	Tom English; Reece Hodge; Campbell Magnay; Bill Meakes	(substituted off) Tom English (to (Japan) Kurita Water Gush); (substituted off) Bill Meakes (to (United States) LA Giltinis)	(substituted in) Lewis Holland (from Australia Sevens); (substituted in) Stacey Ili (from (New Zealand) Hawke's Bay); (substituted in) Ilikena Vudogo (from Brisbane Broncos)	Reece Hodge; Lewis Holland; Stacey Ili (short-term); Campbell Magnay; Ilikena Vudogo
WG	Andrew Kellaway; Marika Koroibete; Tom Pincus (short-term, did not play); Harry Potter (did not play); Semisi Tupou (did not play)	(substituted off) Harry Potter (to (England) Leicester Tigers); (substituted off) Semisi Tupou (to (Japan) Panasonic Wild Knights)	(substituted in) Lachie Anderson (from Australia Sevens); (substituted in) Glen Vaihu (from Gregory Terrace); (substituted in) Young Tonumaipea (from Gold Coast Titans)	Lachie Anderson; Andrew Kellaway (short-term); Marika Koroibete; Tom Pincus; Glen Vaihu; Young Tonumaipea
FB	Dane Haylett-Petty		(substituted in) George Worth (from (England) Leicester Tigers)	Dane Haylett-Petty; George Worth (short-term)
Coach	David Wessels		(substituted in) Kevin Foote (from assistant coach)	Kevin Foote (interim); David Wessels

== Reds ==
Reds transfers 2020–2021
Pos	2020 squad	Out	In	2021 players
PR	David Feao (development squad, did not play); Feao Fotuaika; Harry Hoopert; JP Smith; Jack Straker (short-term, did not play); Taniela Tupou; Dane Zander (short-term)	(substituted off) David Feao (to (France) Carcassonne); (substituted off) JP Smith (to (United States) LA Giltinis); (substituted off) Jack Straker (to GPS)	(substituted in) Zane Nonggorr (from Bond University)	Feao Fotuaika; Harry Hoopert; Zane Nonggorr; Taniela Tupou; Dane Zander
HK	Ed Craig (short-term); Sean Farrell (did not play); Alex Mafi; Josh Nasser; Brandon Paenga-Amosa	(substituted off) Ed Craig (to Rebels); (substituted off) Sean Farrell (to Souths)	(substituted in) Richie Asiata (from (Canada) Toronto Arrows); (substituted in) Matt Faessler (from Brothers)	Richie Asiata (short-term); Matt Faessler (did not play); Alex Mafi; Josh Nasser; Brandon Paenga-Amosa
LK	Angus Blyth; Harry Hockings; Izack Rodda; Lukhan Salakaia-Loto; Tuaina Taii Tualima (development squad, did not play); Michael Wood (did not play)	(substituted off) Harry Hockings (to (Japan) Suntory Sungoliath); (substituted off) Izack Rodda (to (France) Lyon); (substituted off) Michael Wood (to Waratahs)	(substituted in) Ben Grant (from Force); (substituted in) Ryan Smith (from Brothers)	Angus Blyth; Ben Grant (did not play); Lukhan Salakaia-Loto; Ryan Smith; Tuaina Taii Tualima
FL	Tom Kibble (did not play); Fraser McReight; Angus Scott-Young; Harry Wilson; Liam Wright	(substituted off) Tom Kibble (injured)	(substituted in) Sam Wallis (from University of Queensland)	Fraser McReight; Angus Scott-Young; Sam Wallis; Harry Wilson; Liam Wright
N8	Seru Uru			Seru Uru
SH	Scott Malolua; Tate McDermott; Moses Sorovi	(substituted off) Scott Malolua (retired)	(substituted in) Kalani Thomas (from Souths)	Tate McDermott; Moses Sorovi; Kalani Thomas
FH	Carter Gordon (did not play); Bryce Hegarty; James O'Connor	(substituted off) Carter Gordon (to Rebels)	(substituted in) Lawson Creighton (from Brothers)	Lawson Creighton (did not play); Bryce Hegarty; James O'Connor
CE	Chris Feauai-Sautia; Isaac Lucas; Hunter Paisami (development squad); Jordan Petaia; Hamish Stewart	(substituted off) Chris Feauai-Sautia (to (France) Oyonnax); (substituted off) Isaac Lucas (to (Japan) Ricoh Black Rams)	(substituted in) Hudson Creighton (from Brothers); (substituted in) Josh Flook (from Brothers); (substituted in) Isaac Henry (from Wests)	Hudson Creighton; Josh Flook; Isaac Henry; Hunter Paisami; Jordan Petaia; Hamish Stewart
WG	Jock Campbell; Filipo Daugunu; Henry Speight	(substituted off) Henry Speight (to (France) Biarritz)	(substituted in) Ilaisa Droasese (from Wests); (substituted in) Suliasi Vunivalu (from Melbourne Storm)	Jock Campbell; Filipo Daugunu; Ilaisa Droasese; Suliasi Vunivalu
FB	Jack Hardy (did not play)	(substituted off) Jack Hardy (to Easts)	(substituted in) Mac Grealy (from University of Queensland)	Mac Grealy
Coach	Brad Thorn			Brad Thorn

== Waratahs ==
Waratahs transfers 2020–2021
Pos	2020 squad	Out	In	2021 squad
PR	Charlie Abel (did not play); Angus Bell; Darcy Breen (development squad, did not play); Tetera Faulkner; Harry Johnson-Holmes; Rory O'Connor; Tom Robertson; Chris Talakai; Tiaan Tauakipulu (development squad, did not play); Andrew Tuala	(substituted off) Charlie Abel (to (United States) LA Giltinis); (substituted off) Rory O'Connor (to Warringah); (substituted off) Tom Robertson (to Force)	(substituted in) Pekahou Cowan (from Force); (substituted in) Vunipola Fifita (from Eastern Suburbs); (substituted in) George Francis (from Easts Tigers); (substituted in) Alefosio Tatola (from Manly)	Angus Bell; Darcy Breen (short-term); Pekahou Cowan (short-term); Tetera Faulkner; Vunipola Fifita (short-term); George Francis (short-term, did not play); Harry Johnson-Holmes; Chris Talakai; Alefosio Tatola; Tiaan Tauakipulu (did not play); Andrew Tuala (short-term)
HK	Robbie Abel; Joe Cotton (development squad, did not play); Damien Fitzpatrick; Tom Horton (did not play)	(substituted off) Damien Fitzpatrick (retired)	(substituted in) Dave Porecki (from (England) London Irish)	Robbie Abel; Joe Cotton; Tom Horton; Dave Porecki
LK	Max Douglas (development squad, did not play); Ned Hanigan (did not play); Jed Holloway; Ryan McCauley; Rob Simmons; Tom Staniforth; Jeremy Williams (development squad, did not play)	(substituted off) Ned Hanigan (to (Japan) Kurita Water Gush); (substituted off) Jed Holloway (to (Japan) Toyota Verblitz); (substituted off) Ryan McCauley (to Force); (substituted off) Rob Simmons (to (England) London Irish); (substituted off) Tom Staniforth (to (France) Castres)	(substituted in) Sam Caird (from (New Zealand) Blues); (substituted in) Jack Whetton (from (New Zealand) Highlanders); (substituted in) Michael Wood (from Reds); (substituted in) Sam Wykes (from (Japan) Shimizu Blue Sharks)	Sam Caird; Max Douglas; Jack Whetton; Jeremy Williams; Michael Wood (short-term); Sam Wykes
FL	Jack Dempsey; Charlie Gamble (did not play); Michael Hooper; Hugh Sinclair (did not play); Lachlan Swinton; Carlo Tizzano	(substituted off) Michael Hooper (to (Japan) Toyota Verblitz)	(substituted in) Rahboni Warren-Vosayaco (from (Japan) Munakata Sanix Blues)	Jack Dempsey; Charlie Gamble; Hugh Sinclair; Lachlan Swinton; Carlo Tizzano; Rahboni Warren-Vosayaco (short-term)
N8	Will Harris (did not play); Pat Tafa	(substituted off) Pat Tafa (to (Japan) NEC Green Rockets)		Will Harris
SH	Jake Gordon; Michael McDonald; Henry Robertson (development squad, did not play); Mitch Short	(substituted off) Michael McDonald (to Force); (substituted off) Mitch Short (to Randwick)	(substituted in) Jack Grant (from (Japan) NTT Red Hurricanes)	Jake Gordon; Jack Grant; Henry Robertson
FH	Ben Donaldson (development squad, did not play); Will Harrison; Mack Mason (did not play); Jack Walsh (development squad, did not play)	(substituted off) Mack Mason (to (United States) Austin Gilgronis); (substituted off) Jack Walsh (to (England) Exeter Chiefs)	(substituted in) Tane Edmed (from Eastwood)	Ben Donaldson; Tane Edmed; Will Harrison
CE	Kurtley Beale; Lalakai Foketi; Tepai Moeroa; Joey Walton (did not play)	(substituted off) Kurtley Beale (to (France) Racing 92)	(substituted in) Izaia Perese (from (France) Bayonne)	Lalakai Foketi; Tepai Moeroa; Izaia Perese; Joey Walton
WG	Cam Clark; Siosifa Lisala; Mark Nawaqanitawase; Alex Newsome; James Ramm; Triston Reilly (development squad, did not play)	(substituted off) Cam Clark (to (United States) San Diego Legion); (substituted off) Siosifa Lisala (to (Japan) Toyota Shokki)	(substituted in) James Turner (from Northern Suburbs)	Mark Nawaqanitawase; Alex Newsome; James Ramm; Triston Reilly; James Turner (short-term)
FB	Karmichael Hunt; Jack Maddocks	(substituted off) Karmichael Hunt (to Souths Logan Magpies)		Jack Maddocks
Coach	Rob Penney		(substituted in) Jason Gilmore (from assistant coach); (substituted in) Chris Whitaker (from assistant coach)	Jason Gilmore (interim); Rob Penney; Chris Whitaker (interim)

== See also ==
- List of 2020–21 Premiership Rugby transfers
- List of 2020–21 Pro14 transfers
- List of 2020–21 Top 14 transfers
- List of 2020–21 RFU Championship transfers
- SANZAAR
- Super Rugby franchise areas
