= List of 2021–22 Super Rugby transfers (Australia) =

This is a list of player movements for Super Rugby teams prior to the end of the 2022 Super Rugby Pacific season. Departure and arrivals of all players that were included in a Super Rugby squad for 2021 or 2022 are listed here, regardless of when it occurred. Future-dated transfers are only included if confirmed by the player or his agent, his former team or his new team.

Notes

- 2021 players listed are all players that were named in the initial senior squad, or subsequently included in a 23-man match day squad at any game during the season.
- (did not play) denotes that a player did not play at all during one of the two seasons due to injury or non-selection. These players are included to indicate they were contracted to the team. For the 2021 season, players listed as 'did not play' did not feature in any matches in Super Rugby AU or Super Rugby Trans-Tasman.
- (short-term) denotes that a player wasn't initially contracted, but came in during the season. This could either be a club rugby player coming in as injury cover, or a player whose contract had expired at another team (typically in the northern hemisphere).
- (development squad) denotes a player that wasn't named in the original squad, but was announced as signing as a development player. These are often younger players or club players. Different teams use different names for development players. Other names used include (wider training group) or (wider training squad).
- Flags are only shown for players moving to or from another country.
- Players may play in several positions, but are listed in only one.

== Brumbies ==
Brumbies transfers 2021–2022
| Pos | 2021 squad | Out | In | 2022 players |
|---|---|---|---|---|
| PR | Allan Alaalatoa; Archer Holz; Fred Kaihea (short-term); Sefo Kautai (short-term); Harry Lloyd; Tom Ross; Scott Sio; James Slipper | (substituted off) Archer Holz (to Waratahs); (substituted off) Harry Lloyd (to Force) | | Allan Alaalatoa; Fred Kaihea; Sefo Kautai; Tom Ross; Scott Sio; James Slipper |
| HK | Folau Fainga'a; Lachlan Lonergan; Connal McInerney; Billy Pollard | | | Folau Fainga'a; Lachlan Lonergan; Connal McInerney; Billy Pollard |
| LK | Nick Frost; Tom Hooper; Cadeyrn Neville; Darcy Swain; James Tucker | (substituted off) James Tucker (to (New Zealand) Blues) | | Nick Frost; Tom Hooper; Cadeyrn Neville; Darcy Swain |
| BR | Jahrome Brown; Tom Cusack; Will Miller (short-term); Luke Reimer; Pete Samu; Rory Scott; Henry Stowers (short-term); Rob Valetini | (substituted off) Tom Cusack (retired); (substituted off) Will Miller (retired); (substituted off) Henry Stowers (to (New Zealand) Moana Pasifika) | (substituted in) Ed Kennedy (from (Wales) Scarlets) | Jahrome Brown; Ed Kennedy; Luke Reimer; Pete Samu; Rory Scott; Rob Valetini |
| SH | Lachie Albert (did not play); Issak Fines-Leleiwasa; Ryan Lonergan; Nic White | (substituted off) Issak Fines-Leleiwasa (to Force) | | Lachie Albert; Ryan Lonergan; Nic White |
| FH | Bayley Kuenzle; Noah Lolesio; Reesjan Pasitoa | (substituted off) Bayley Kuenzle (to Force); (substituted off) Reesjan Pasitoa (to Force) | (substituted in) Rodney Iona (from Tuggeranong Vikings) | Rodney Iona; Noah Lolesio |
| CE | Len Ikitau; Irae Simone; Reece Tapine (did not play) | (substituted off) Reece Tapine (to Force) | (substituted in) Hudson Creighton (from Reds); (substituted in) Chris Feauai-Sautia (from (France) Oyonnax); (substituted in) Ollie Sapsford (from (New Zealand) Hawke's Bay) | Hudson Creighton; Chris Feauai-Sautia; Len Ikitau; Ollie Sapsford; Irae Simone |
| WG | Solomone Kata; Andy Muirhead; Tom Wright | (substituted off) Solomone Kata (to (New Zealand) Moana Pasifika) | (substituted in) Cam Clark (from (United States) San Diego Legion) | Cam Clark; Andy Muirhead; Tom Wright |
| FB | Tom Banks; Mack Hansen | (substituted off) Mack Hansen (to (Ireland) Connacht) | (substituted in) Jesse Mogg (from (France) Pau) | Tom Banks; Jesse Mogg |
| Coach | Dan McKellar | | | Dan McKellar |

== Force ==
Force transfers 2021–2022
| Pos | 2021 squad | Out | In | 2022 squad |
|---|---|---|---|---|
| PR | Bo Abra (wider training squad, did not play); Victor Harris (wider training squad, did not play); Chris Heiberg (did not play); Greg Holmes; Kieran Longbottom; Santiago Medrano; Tom Robertson; Angus Wagner | (substituted off) Victor Harris (to Joondalup Brothers); (substituted off) Chris Heiberg (to Palmyra); (substituted off) Kieran Longbottom (retired) | (substituted in) Harry Lloyd (from Brumbies) | Bo Abra; Greg Holmes; Harry Lloyd; Santiago Medrano; Tom Robertson; Angus Wagner |
| HK | Feleti Kaitu'u; Andrew Ready; Jack Winchester | | | Feleti Kaitu'u; Andrew Ready; Jack Winchester |
| LK | Ryan McCauley; Jackson Pugh (wider training squad, did not play); Jeremy Thrush; Sitaleki Timani (short-term) | (substituted off) Sitaleki Timani (released) | (substituted in) Izack Rodda (from (France) Lyon); (substituted in) Will Sankey (from Uni-Norths) | Ryan McCauley; Jackson Pugh; Izack Rodda; Will Sankey (short-term); Jeremy Thrush |
| BR | Tim Anstee; Ollie Callan (wider training squad); Kane Koteka; Fergus Lee-Warner; Tomás Lezana; Brynard Stander | (substituted off) Tomás Lezana (to (Wales) Scarlets) | (substituted in) Alex Masibaka (from Associates) | Tim Anstee; Ollie Callan; Kane Koteka; Fergus Lee-Warner; Alex Masibaka (short-term); Brynard Stander |
| SH | Tomás Cubelli; Michael McDonald (wider training squad); Ian Prior | (substituted off) Tomás Cubelli (to (France) Biarritz) | (substituted in) Issak Fines-Leleiwasa (from Brumbies) | Issak Fines-Leleiwasa; Michael McDonald; Ian Prior |
| FH | Jono Lance; Jake McIntyre; Domingo Miotti | (substituted off) Jono Lance (to (Japan) Mie Honda Heat); (substituted off) Domingo Miotti (to (Scotland) Glasgow Warriors) | (substituted in) Bayley Kuenzle (from Brumbies); (substituted in) Reesjan Pasitoa (from Brumbies) | Bayley Kuenzle; Jake McIntyre; Reesjan Pasitoa |
| CE | Kyle Godwin; Richard Kahui; Tevita Kuridrani; Grason Makara (wider training squad, did not play); Jordan Olowofela (short-term); Henry Taefu | (substituted off) Tevita Kuridrani (to (France) Biarritz); (substituted off) Jordan Olowofela (returned to (England) Leicester Tigers); (substituted off) Henry Taefu (to (New Zealand) Moana Pasifika) | (substituted in) Reece Tapine (from Brumbies) | Kyle Godwin; Richard Kahui; Grason Makara; Reece Tapine |
| WG | Marcel Brache; Brad Lacey (did not play); Jonah Placid (did not play); Toni Pulu; Byron Ralston | (substituted off) Marcel Brache (to (United States) Austin Gilgronis); (substituted off) Jonah Placid (to Southern Lions) | (substituted in) Daniel Ala (from Manly Warringah Sea Eagles); (substituted in) Manasa Mataele (from (New Zealand) Crusaders) | Daniel Ala; Brad Lacey; Manasa Mataele; Toni Pulu; Byron Ralston |
| FB | Rob Kearney; Jack McGregor; Jake Strachan | (substituted off) Rob Kearney (retired) | | Jack McGregor; Jake Strachan |
| Coach | Tim Sampson | | | Tim Sampson |

== Rebels ==
Rebels transfers 2021–2022
| Pos | 2021 squad | Out | In | 2022 players |
|---|---|---|---|---|
| PR | Isaac Aedo Kailea (development squad); Albert Anae; Cabous Eloff; Pone Fa'amausili; Matt Gibbon; Cameron Orr; Lucio Sordoni; Rhys van Nek | (substituted off) Albert Anae (to Reds); (substituted off) Lucio Sordoni (to (France) Mont-de-Marsan) | (substituted in) Sef Fa'agase (from (New Zealand) Otago); (substituted in) Emosi Tuqiri (from Marist College) | Isaac Aedo Kailea (wider-training squad); Cabous Eloff; Sef Fa'agase (short-term); Pone Fa'amausili; Matt Gibbon; Cameron Orr; Emosi Tuqiri (wider-training squad); Rhys van Nek |
| HK | Ed Craig; James Hanson; Jordan Uelese | (substituted off) Ed Craig (to Waratahs) | (substituted in) Efi Ma'afu (from (Japan) Yokohama Canon Eagles) | James Hanson; Efi Ma'afu; Jordan Uelese |
| LK | Ignacio Calas (did not play); Steve Cummins; Ross Haylett-Petty; Trevor Hosea; Tom Nowlan (short-term) | (substituted off) Ignacio Calas (to (France) Carcassonne); (substituted off) Steve Cummins (to (France) Pau) | (substituted in) Josh Canham (from Melbourne Harlequins); (substituted in) Josh Hill (from (New Zealand) Otago); (substituted in) Daniel Maiava (from GPS); (substituted in) Matt Philip (from (France) Pau) | Josh Canham (wider-training squad); Ross Haylett-Petty; Josh Hill (short-term); Trevor Hosea; Daniel Maiava (short-term); Tom Nowlan; Matt Philip |
| BR | Richard Hardwick; Michael Icely (short-term); Josh Kemeny; Rob Leota; Isi Naisarani; Michael Wells; Brad Wilkin | (substituted off) Isi Naisarani (to (Japan) Shizuoka Blue Revs) | (substituted in) Tamati Ioane (from Gungahlin Eagles); (substituted in) Sione Lolesio (from Wyndham City Rhinos); (substituted in) Sam Wallis (from Reds) | Richard Hardwick; Michael Icely (wider-training squad); Tamati Ioane; Josh Kemeny; Rob Leota; Sione Lolesio (wider-training squad); Sam Wallis (short-term); Michael Wells; Brad Wilkin |
| SH | Frank Lomani; Joe Powell; Theo Strang (did not play); James Tuttle | (substituted off) Frank Lomani (to (Fiji) Drua); (substituted off) Theo Strang (to (England) Bristol Bears) | (substituted in) Moses Sorovi (from Reds) | Joe Powell; Moses Sorovi; James Tuttle |
| FH | Carter Gordon | | (substituted in) Nick Jooste (from Eastern Suburbs) | Carter Gordon; Nick Jooste (short-term) |
| CE | Lewis Holland; Stacey Ili (short-term); Campbell Magnay; Jeral Skelton; Young Tonumaipea; Matt To'omua; Glen Vaihu | (substituted off) Lewis Holland (to Australia Sevens); (substituted off) Campbell Magnay (injured) | (substituted in) Lebron Naea (from Endeavour Hills); (substituted in) Ray Nu'u (from (New Zealand) Otago); (substituted in) Lukas Ripley (from Souths) | Stacey Ili; Lebron Naea (wider-training squad); Ray Nu'u; Lukas Ripley; Jeral Skelton; Young Tonumaipea; Matt To'omua; Glen Vaihu (short-term) |
| WG | Lachie Anderson; Andrew Kellaway (short-term); Marika Koroibete; Tom Pincus; Ilikena Vudogo | (substituted off) Marika Koroibete (to (Japan) Saitama Wild Knights); (substituted off) Tom Pincus (retired) | (substituted in) Joe Pincus (from Australia Sevens) | Lachie Anderson; Andrew Kellaway; Joe Pincus; Ilikena Vudogo |
| FB | Dane Haylett-Petty; Reece Hodge; George Worth (short-term) | (substituted off) Dane Haylett-Petty (retired) | (substituted in) Mason Gordon (from Brisbane Boys' College) | Mason Gordon (wider-training squad); Reece Hodge; George Worth (short-term) |
| Coach | Kevin Foote (interim); David Wessels | (substituted off) David Wessels (released) | | Kevin Foote |

== Reds ==
Reds transfers 2021–2022
| Pos | 2021 squad | Out | In | 2022 players |
|---|---|---|---|---|
| PR | Feao Fotuaika; Harry Hoopert; Zane Nonggorr; Taniela Tupou; Dane Zander | | (substituted in) Albert Anae (from Rebels); (substituted in) George Blake (from Bond University); (substituted in) Sef Fa'agase (from (New Zealand) Otago) | Albert Anae (short-term); George Blake; Sef Fa'agase (short-term); Feao Fotuaika; Harry Hoopert; Zane Nonggorr; Taniela Tupou; Dane Zander |
| HK | Richie Asiata (short-term); Matt Faessler (did not play); Alex Mafi; Josh Nasser; Brandon Paenga-Amosa | (substituted off) Brandon Paenga-Amosa (to (France) Montpellier) | | Richie Asiata; Matt Faessler (short-term); Alex Mafi; Josh Nasser |
| LK | Angus Blyth; Ben Grant (did not play); Lukhan Salakaia-Loto; Ryan Smith; Tuaina Taii Tualima | (substituted off) Ben Grant (to (United States) San Diego Legion) | (substituted in) Lopeti Faifua (from Wests); (substituted in) Connor Vest (from University of Queensland) | Angus Blyth; Lopeti Faifua; Lukhan Salakaia-Loto; Ryan Smith; Tuaina Taii Tualima; Connor Vest (short-term) |
| BR | Fraser McReight; Angus Scott-Young; Seru Uru; Sam Wallis; Harry Wilson; Liam Wright | (substituted off) Sam Wallis (to Rebels) | | Fraser McReight; Angus Scott-Young; Seru Uru; Harry Wilson; Liam Wright |
| SH | Tate McDermott; Moses Sorovi; Kalani Thomas | (substituted off) Moses Sorovi (to Rebels) | (substituted in) Spencer Jeans (from Bond University) | Spencer Jeans; Tate McDermott; Kalani Thomas |
| FH | Lawson Creighton (did not play); Bryce Hegarty; James O'Connor | (substituted off) Bryce Hegarty (to (England) Leicester Tigers) | (substituted in) Tom Lynagh (from (England) Harlequins) | Lawson Creighton; Tom Lynagh; James O'Connor |
| CE | Hudson Creighton; Josh Flook; Isaac Henry; Hunter Paisami; Jordan Petaia; Hamish Stewart | (substituted off) Hudson Creighton (to Brumbies) | | Josh Flook; Isaac Henry; Hunter Paisami; Jordan Petaia; Hamish Stewart |
| WG | Jock Campbell; Filipo Daugunu; Ilaisa Droasese; Suliasi Vunivalu | | | Jock Campbell; Filipo Daugunu; Ilaisa Droasese; Suliasi Vunivalu |
| FB | Mac Grealy | | (substituted in) Floyd Aubrey (from GPS) | Floyd Aubrey (short-term); Mac Grealy |
| Coach | Brad Thorn | | | Brad Thorn |

== Waratahs ==
Waratahs transfers 2021–2022
| Pos | 2021 squad | Out | In | 2022 squad |
|---|---|---|---|---|
| PR | Angus Bell; Darcy Breen (short-term); Pekahou Cowan (short-term); Tetera Faulkner; Vunipola Fifita (short-term); George Francis (short-term, did not play); Harry Johnson-Holmes; Chris Talakai; Alefosio Tatola; Tiaan Tauakipulu (did not play); Andrew Tuala (short-term) | (substituted off) Darcy Breen (to Sydney University); (substituted off) Pekahou Cowan (to (New Zealand) Wellington); (substituted off) Vunipola Fifita (returned to Eastern Suburbs); (substituted off) George Francis (returned to Easts Tigers); (substituted off) Chris Talakai (to (France) Bayonne); (substituted off) Alefosio Tatola (to Manly); (substituted off) Andrew Tuala (to (United States) LA Giltinis) | (substituted in) Adrian Brown (from Eastwood); (substituted in) Archer Holz (from Brumbies); (substituted in) Paddy Ryan (from (Japan) Munakata Sanix Blues); (substituted in) Ruan Smith (from (United States) LA Giltinis); (substituted in) Hamdahn Tuipulotu (from (New Zealand) Auckland) | Angus Bell; Adrian Brown (wider-training squad); Tetera Faulkner; Archer Holz (wider training squad); Harry Johnson-Holmes; Paddy Ryan (short-term); Ruan Smith; Tiaan Tauakipulu; Hamdahn Tuipulotu (wider training squad) |
| HK | Robbie Abel; Joe Cotton; Tom Horton; Dave Porecki | (substituted off) Robbie Abel (retired); (substituted off) Joe Cotton (to (England) Bristol Bears) | (substituted in) Ed Craig (from Rebels); (substituted in) Mahe Vailanu (from (United States) LA Giltinis) | Ed Craig (short-term); Tom Horton; Dave Porecki; Mahe Vailanu (short-term) |
| LK | Sam Caird; Max Douglas; Jack Whetton; Jeremy Williams; Michael Wood (short-term); Sam Wykes | (substituted off) Sam Caird (to (New Zealand) Highlanders); (substituted off) Jack Whetton (to (France) Castres); (substituted off) Michael Wood (to Randwick); (substituted off) Sam Wykes (retired) | (substituted in) Hugh Bokenham (from Sydney University); (substituted in) Geoff Cridge (from (New Zealand) Hawke's Bay); (substituted in) Ned Hanigan (from (Japan) Kurita Water Gush Akishima); (substituted in) Jed Holloway (from (Japan) Toyota Verblitz) | Hugh Bokenham; Geoff Cridge; Max Douglas; Ned Hanigan; Jed Holloway; Jeremy Williams (wider training squad) |
| BR | Jack Dempsey; Charlie Gamble; Will Harris; Hugh Sinclair; Lachlan Swinton; Carlo Tizzano; Rahboni Warren-Vosayaco (short-term) | (substituted off) Jack Dempsey (to (Scotland) Glasgow Warriors) | (substituted in) Langi Gleeson (from Manly); (substituted in) Michael Hooper (returned from (Japan) Toyota Verblitz) | Charlie Gamble (wider training squad); Langi Gleeson (wider training squad); Will Harris; Michael Hooper; Hugh Sinclair; Lachlan Swinton; Carlo Tizzano; Rahboni Warren-Vosayaco |
| SH | Jake Gordon; Jack Grant; Henry Robertson | | (substituted in) Teddy Wilson (from Eastern Suburbs) | Jake Gordon; Jack Grant; Henry Robertson (wider training squad); Teddy Wilson (short-term) |
| FH | Ben Donaldson; Tane Edmed; Will Harrison | | | Ben Donaldson; Tane Edmed; Will Harrison |
| CE | Lalakai Foketi; Tepai Moeroa; Izaia Perese; Joey Walton | (substituted off) Tepai Moeroa (to Melbourne Storm) | (substituted in) Jamie Roberts (from (Wales) Dragons); (substituted in) Mosese Tuipulotu (from Eastern Suburbs) | Lalakai Foketi; Izaia Perese; Jamie Roberts; Mosese Tuipulotu (wider training squad); Joey Walton |
| WG | Mark Nawaqanitawase; Alex Newsome; James Ramm; Triston Reilly; James Turner (short-term) | | (substituted in) Dylan Pietsch (from Australia Sevens) | Mark Nawaqanitawase; Alex Newsome; Dylan Pietsch (wider training squad); James Ramm; Triston Reilly; James Turner (short-term) |
| FB | Jack Maddocks | (substituted off) Jack Maddocks (to (France) Pau) | (substituted in) Kurtley Beale (from (France) Racing 92); (substituted in) Tevita Funa (from Manly Warringah Sea Eagles) | Kurtley Beale (short-term); Tevita Funa |
| Coach | Jason Gilmore (interim); Rob Penney; Chris Whitaker (interim) | (substituted off) Jason Gilmore (returned to assistant coach); (substituted off) Rob Penney (to (Japan) Shining Arcs); (substituted off) Chris Whitaker (returned to assistant coach) | (substituted in) Darren Coleman (from (United States) LA Giltinis) | Darren Coleman |

== See also ==
- List of 2021–22 Premiership Rugby transfers
- List of 2021–22 United Rugby Championship transfers
- List of 2021–22 Top 14 transfers
- List of 2021–22 RFU Championship transfers
- List of 2021–22 Rugby Pro D2 transfers
- List of 2021–22 Major League Rugby transfers
- SANZAAR
- Super Rugby franchise areas
