= 2021 Super Rugby season =

Men's rugby union club competition

- Countries: Australia (5 teams); New Zealand (5 teams)
- Tournament format(s): Two regionalised round-robin tournaments followed by a crossover competition
- Official website: Official site

The 2021 Super Rugby season was the 26th season of Super Rugby, an annual men's international rugby union tournament organised by SANZAAR, involving teams from Australia and New Zealand. Due to the COVID-19 pandemic the tournament was wholly regionalised, with the 2021 Super Rugby Aotearoa season and the 2021 Super Rugby AU season replacing the previous 15 side format used from 2018 till 2020. Super Rugby Trans-Tasman followed these tournaments, a crossover competition that featured the five Australian sides playing the five New Zealand sides.

== Competition format ==
The five New Zealand sides competed in the 2nd Super Rugby Aotearoa season, while the four Australian sides, plus the addition again of the Western Force, competed in the 2nd Super Rugby AU season. The competition did not feature any South African sides who announced their withdrawal from Super Rugby in September 2020, while the Japanese side, the Sunwolves, was confirmed as leaving the league in March 2019. The Argentinian side, the Jaguares, were also not named in any competition and did not compete in 2021. Following the draw for the 2021 Super Rugby AU season, Rugby Australia confirmed they were working with New Zealand Rugby on a trans-Tasman competition to follow the Super Rugby Aotearoa and Super Rugby AU seasons. On 13 November, this tournament was confirmed as Super Rugby Trans-Tasman, which featured the Australian and New Zealand sides playing each other in 25 crossover matches before a final. All sides played two home matches, and two away matches as well as a 'Super Round' where all matches will be played in one location over the course of one weekend. The final was then held between the top two teams in the combined competition table.

== Law variations ==
Both Super Rugby AU and Super Rugby Aotearoa saw law changes again for 2021. Super Rugby AU saw changes to kick-offs and restarts, with a free kick awarded if a kickoff has not taken place 30 seconds following the opposition scoring, a restart is kicked out on the full or if teammates of the kicker are not behind the ball. The free kick will take place at half way. These rules are similar to those that are currently used in Rugby sevens. Also the 'Golden point' law brought in during the 2020 season is tweaked so that full-time will only occur after a try is scored, rather than any form of points. Penalties and drop goals will still count towards the score during extra time, but will not end the game, with play only ending if a try is scored or the 10-minute extra time period ends.

Super Rugby Aotearoa saw the introduction of goal-line drop outs, brought in for when an attacking player is held up or knocks the ball on in goal. When a kick is forced in goal by the defending team then a goal-line drop out will also take place. These rules were used successfully in the Australian 2020 Super Rugby AU season. Extra time was also used again in 2021, again consisting of a 10-minute period, however differing from the 2021 Super Rugby AU season, the team scoring the first points of any kind in this period will win the match. A captain's referral was also brought in for 2021, similar to those used successfully in cricket and tennis, with New Zealand Rugby becoming the first to trial it in rugby union. Each team is allowed one referral per match which can be used in one of three scenarios: a decision occurring in the final five minutes of a match, an offence in the build up to a try being scored or an act of foul play. All other law variations from the 2020 season were again used in both Super Rugby competitions in the 2021 season.

== Future developments ==
In the longer term, a new 12-team tournament from 2022 onwards was mooted, with the current four Australian and five New Zealand sides, plus the full time return of the Australian side the Western Force to Super Rugby, following their departure from the competition at the end of the 2017 Super Rugby season. It was suggested they be joined in the competition by teams from the Pacific Islands and Fiji, with South African sides having confirmed their departure from Super Rugby to join an expanded Pro14 competition, and no place for the Argentinian Jaguares either. On 13 November, New Zealand Rugby confirmed Fiji Rugby and Moana Pasifika as its preferred partners for Super Rugby going forward. A Hawaiian side had been mooted to join the competition, with Kanaloa Pasifika having gone through the process to try and join the competition, however they were not selected by New Zealand Rugby. Kanaloa Pasifika launched legal action over this decision, stating that Moana Pasifika had not gone through the correct process to join the competition.

On 24 February 2021, the Fiji Rugby Union announced it had completed its business plan for the entry of Fijian Drua to Super Rugby in 2022 and submitted it to the New Zealand Rugby Union. The plan outlines financial targets, initial playing squad and coaching structure as well as outlining the complete administrative structures for the team. The team will be a separate entity from the Fijian Rugby Union, similar to that of the Drua's entry into the Australian National Rugby Championship in 2017. The team is still required to meet stringent financial conditions set by the New Zealand Rugby Union, and so was seeking NZ$10 million in private investment to allow the team to join in 2022. Further steps were announced on both sides joining the competition in March 2021, with New Zealand Rugby Union agreeing to a sharing of broadcasting revenue with both potential sides. On 24 March 2021, World Rugby announced financial, high performance and administrative support for both potential new franchises, in order to boost the performances of Pacific Islands at international level, while also being able to stay local instead of heading overseas.

On 14 April 2021, both the Fijian Drua and Moana Pasifika were granted conditional licenses to join Super Rugby in 2022 by the New Zealand Rugby Union. They will join the existing five New Zealand Super Rugby sides, plus the existing four Australian sides along with the Western Force who will return to the competition full-time having taken part in both editions of Super Rugby AU and Super Rugby Trans-Tasman.

On 12 July 2021, Moana Pasifika were granted an unconditional licence, confirming them for the 2022 Super Rugby season.

== Players ==
=== Squads ===
The following 2021 Super Rugby squads have been named. Players listed in italics denote non-original squad members.

Blues squad
| Forwards | Leni Apisai • Adrian Choat • Gerard Cowley-Tuioti • Sam Darry • Kurt Eklund • Blake Gibson • Josh Goodhue • Alex Hodgman • Dillon Hunt • Akira Ioane • Nepo Laulala • James Lay • Ray Niuia • Dalton Papalii • Jacob Pierce • Taine Plumtree • Marcel Renata • Tom Robinson • Hoskins Sotutu • Luteru Tolai • Karl Tu'inukuafe • Patrick Tuipulotu • Ofa Tu'ungafasi • Soane Vikena |
| Backs | Otere Black • Finlay Christie • Caleb Clarke • TJ Faiane • Bryce Heem • Rieko Ioane • AJ Lam • Jone Macilai-Tori • Emoni Narawa • Sam Nock • Stephen Perofeta • Harry Plummer • Jacob Ratumaitavuki-Kneepkens • Jonathan Ruru • Zarn Sullivan • Mark Tele'a • Tanielu Teleʻa |
| Coach | Leon MacDonald |

Brumbies squad
| Forwards | Allan Alaalatoa • Jahrome Brown • Tom Cusack • Folau Fainga'a • Nick Frost • Archer Holz • Tom Hooper • Fred Kaihea • Sefo Kautai • Harry Lloyd • Lachlan Lonergan • Connal McInerney • Will Miller • Cadeyrn Neville • Billy Pollard • Luke Reimer • Tom Ross • Pete Samu • Rory Scott • Scott Sio • James Slipper • Henry Stowers • Darcy Swain • James Tucker • Rob Valetini |
| Backs | Lachlan Albert • Tom Banks • Issak Fines • Mack Hansen • Len Ikitau • Solomone Kata • Bayley Kuenzle • Noah Lolesio • Ryan Lonergan • Andy Muirhead • Reesjan Pasitoa • Irae Simone • Reece Tapine • Nic White • Tom Wright |
| Coach | Dan McKellar |

Chiefs squad
| Forwards | Naitoa Ah Kuoi • Joe Apikotoa • Kaylum Boshier • Lachlan Boshier • Mitchell Brown • Sam Cane • Samipeni Finau • Tom Florence • Nathan Harris • Luke Jacobson • Zane Kapeli • Mitchell Karpik • Ezekiel Lindenmuth • Josh Lord • Sione Mafileo • Laghlan McWhannell • Liam Messam • Atu Moli • Ollie Norris • Reuben O'Neill • Simon Parker • Aidan Ross • Bradley Slater • Pita Gus Sowakula • Angus Ta'avao • Samisoni Taukei'aho • Viliami Taulani • Tupou Vaa'i |
| Backs | Bryn Gatland • Anton Lienert-Brown • Jonah Lowe • Damian McKenzie • Etene Nanai-Seturo • Alex Nankivell • Rameka Poihipi • Rivez Reihana • Xavier Roe • Shaun Stevenson • Bailyn Sullivan • Te Toiroa Tahuriorangi • Chase Tiatia • Kaleb Trask • Quinn Tupaea • Sean Wainui • Brad Weber • Gideon Wrampling |
| Coach | Clayton McMillan |

Crusaders squad
| Forwards | Michael Alaalatoa • Liam Allen • Scott Barrett • Ethan Blackadder • George Bower • Tom Christie • Whetu Douglas • Mitchell Dunshea • Cullen Grace • Sione Havili • Oliver Jager • Quentin MacDonald • Andrew Makalio • Brodie McAlister • Joe Moody • Fletcher Newell • Brendon O'Connor • Luke Romano • Tom Sanders • Quinten Strange • Codie Taylor • Isi Tu'ungafasi • Nathan Vella • Sam Whitelock • Tamaiti Williams |
| Backs | George Bridge • Fergus Burke • Brett Cameron • Mitchell Drummond • Ere Enari • Braydon Ennor • Leicester Fainga'anuku • Chay Fihaki • Jack Goodhue • Bryn Hall • David Havili • Will Jordan • Manasa Mataele • Josh McKay • Dallas McLeod • Richie Mo'unga • Isaiah Punivai • Rene Ranger • Sevu Reece |
| Coach | Scott Robertson |

Force squad
| Forwards | Bo Abra • Tim Anstee • Ollie Callan • Victor Harris • Chris Heiberg • Greg Holmes • Feleti Kaitu'u • Kane Koteka • Fergus Lee-Warner • Tomás Lezana • Kieran Longbottom • Ryan McCauley • Santiago Medrano • Jackson Pugh • Andrew Ready • Tom Robertson • Brynard Stander • Jeremy Thrush • Sitaleki Timani • Angus Wagner • Jack Winchester |
| Backs | Marcel Brache • Tomás Cubelli • Kyle Godwin • Richard Kahui • Rob Kearney • Tevita Kuridrani • Brad Lacey • Jono Lance • Grason Makara • Michael McDonald • Jack McGregor • Jake McIntyre • Domingo Miotti • Jordan Olowofela • Jonah Placid • Ian Prior • Toni Pulu • Byron Ralston • Jake Strachan • Henry Taefu |
| Coach | Tim Sampson |

Highlanders squad
| Forwards | Jermaine Ainsley • Teariki Ben-Nicholas • Liam Coltman • Ethan de Groot • Josh Dickson • Ash Dixon • Bryn Evans • Shannon Frizell • Billy Harmon • Kazuki Himeno • Josh Hohneck • Ricky Jackson • Ayden Johnstone • James Lentjes • Daniel Lienert-Brown • Marino Mikaele-Tu'u • Sione Misiloi • Pari Pari Parkinson • Jack Regan • Hugh Renton • Manaaki Selby-Rickit • Liam Squire • Jeff Thwaites • Siate Tokolahi |
| Backs | Solomon Alaimalo • James Arscott • Michael Collins • Folau Fakatava • Connor Garden-Bachop • Sam Gilbert • Scott Gregory • Kayne Hammington • Mitchell Hunt • Josh Ioane • Vilimoni Koroi • Caleb Makene • Nehe Milner-Skudder • Josh Moorby • Jona Nareki • Tim O'Malley • Fetuli Paea • Ngane Punivai • Aaron Smith • Josh Timu • Sio Tomkinson • Thomas Umaga-Jensen • Freedom Vahaakolo |
| Coach | Tony Brown • Clarke Dermody |

Hurricanes squad
| Forwards | Fraser Armstrong • Asafo Aumua • James Blackwell • Dane Coles • Gareth Evans • Alex Fidow • Vaea Fifita • Devan Flanders • Brayden Iose • Du'Plessis Kirifi • Kane Le'aupepe • Tyrel Lomax • Tevita Mafileo • Liam Mitchell • Xavier Numia • James O'Reilly • Reed Prinsep • Pouri Rakete-Stones • Ricky Riccitelli • Ardie Savea • Scott Scrafton • Isaia Walker-Leawere |
| Backs | Vince Aso • Jordie Barrett • Jamie Booth • Luke Campbell • Jackson Garden-Bachop • Wes Goosen • Simon Hickey • Ngani Laumape • Orbyn Leger • Ruben Love • Pepesana Patafilo • Billy Proctor • Salesi Rayasi • Cameron Roigard • Julian Savea • Jonathan Taumateine • Danny Toala • Peter Umaga-Jensen • Lolagi Visinia |
| Coach | Jason Holland |

Rebels squad
| Forwards | Albert Anae • Ignacio Calas • Ed Craig • Steve Cummins • Cabous Eloff • Pone Fa'amausili • Matt Gibbon • James Hanson • Richard Hardwick • Ross Haylett-Petty • Trevor Hosea • Michael Icely • Isaac Aedo Kailea • Josh Kemeny • Rob Leota • Isi Naisarani • Tom Nowlan • Cameron Orr • Jeral Skelton • Lucio Sordoni • Jordan Uelese • Rhys van Nek • Michael Wells • Brad Wilkin |
| Backs | Lachie Anderson • Carter Gordon • Dane Haylett-Petty • Reece Hodge • Lewis Holland • Stacey Ili • Andrew Kellaway • Marika Koroibete • Frank Lomani • Campbell Magnay • Tom Pincus • Joe Powell • Theo Strang • Matt To'omua • James Tuttle • Glen Vaihu • Ilikena Vudogo • Young Tonumaipea • George Worth |
| Coach | Kevin Foote • David Wessels |

Reds squad
| Forwards | Richie Asiata • Angus Blyth • Matt Faessler • Feao Fotuaika • Ben Grant • Harry Hoopert • Alex Mafi • Fraser McReight • Josh Nasser • Zane Nonggorr • Brandon Paenga-Amosa • Lukhan Salakaia-Loto • Angus Scott-Young • Ryan Smith • Tuaina Taii Tualima • Taniela Tupou • Seru Uru • Sam Wallis • Harry Wilson • Liam Wright • Dane Zander |
| Backs | Jock Campbell • Hudson Creighton • Lawson Creighton • Filipo Daugunu • Ilaisa Droasese • Josh Flook • Mac Grealy • Bryce Hegarty • Isaac Henry • Tate McDermott • James O'Connor • Hunter Paisami • Jordan Petaia • Moses Sorovi • Hamish Stewart • Kalani Thomas • Suliasi Vunivalu |
| Coach | Brad Thorn |

Waratahs squad
| Forwards | Robbie Abel • Angus Bell • Darcy Breen • Sam Caird • Joe Cotton • Pekahou Cowan • Jack Dempsey • Max Douglas • Tetera Faulkner • Vunipola Fifita • George Francis • Charlie Gamble • Will Harris • Tom Horton • Harry Johnson-Holmes • Dave Porecki • Hugh Sinclair • Lachlan Swinton • Chris Talakai • Alefosio Tatola • Tiaan Tauakipulu • Carlo Tizzano • Andrew Tuala • Rahboni Warren-Vosayaco • Jack Whetton • Jeremy Williams • Michael Wood • Sam Wykes |
| Backs | Ben Donaldson • Tane Edmed • Lalakai Foketi • Jake Gordon • Jack Grant • Will Harrison • Jack Maddocks • Tepai Moeroa • Mark Nawaqanitawase • Alex Newsome • Izaia Perese • James Ramm • Triston Reilly • Henry Robertson • James Turner • Joey Walton |
| Coach | Jason Gilmore • Rob Penney • Chris Whitaker |

== Referees ==
The following referees were selected to officiate the 2021 Super Rugby season:

2021 Super Rugby referees
| Australia | Nic Berry • Graham Cooper • Angus Gardner • Damon Murphy • Amy Perrett • Jordan Way |
| New Zealand | James Doleman • Mike Fraser • Ben O'Keeffe • Brendon Pickerill • Paul Williams |

== See also ==
- Super Rugby Aotearoa
- Super Rugby AU
- Super Rugby Trans-Tasman
