= List of 2019–20 Super Rugby transfers (Australia) =

This is a list of player movements for Super Rugby teams prior to the end of the 2020 Super Rugby season. Departure and arrivals of all players that were included in a Super Rugby squad for 2019 or 2020 are listed here, regardless of when it occurred. Future-dated transfers are only included if confirmed by the player or his agent, his former team or his new team.

Notes

- The 2019 players listed are all players that were named in the initial senior squad, or subsequently included in a 23-man match day squad at any game during the season.
- (did not play) denotes that a player did not play at all during one of the two seasons due to injury or non-selection. These players are included to indicate they were contracted to the team. For the 2020 season, Super Rugby was suspended after seven rounds of matches due to the COVID-19 pandemic, with regional tournaments taking place there after. Players listed as "did not play" did not feature in any of the seven rounds of matches played that season.
- (short-term) denotes that a player wasn't initially contracted, but came in during the season. This could either be a club rugby player coming in as injury cover, or a player whose contract had expired at another team (typically in the northern hemisphere).
- Flags are only shown for players moving to or from another country.
- Players may play in several positions, but are listed in only one.

== Brumbies ==
Brumbies transfers 2019–2020
Pos	2019 squad	Out	In	2020 players
PR	Allan Alaalatoa; Vunipola Fifita; Leslie Leulua’iali’i-Makin; Tom Ross; Scott Sio; James Slipper; Angus Wagner (short-term, did not play)	(substituted off) Vunipola Fifita (released); (substituted off) Leslie Leulua’iali’i-Makin (injured); (substituted off) Angus Wagner (to Force)	(substituted on) Harry Lloyd (from Force); (substituted on) Shambeckler Vui (from Waratahs)	Allan Alaalatoa; Harry Lloyd; Tom Ross; Scott Sio; James Slipper; Shambeckler Vui (did not play)
HK	Folau Fainga'a; Joshua Mann-Rea; Connal McInerney; Maile Ngauamo (short-term, did not play)	(substituted off) Josh Mann-Rea (retired); (substituted off) Maile Ngauamo (to Brisbane City)	(substituted on) Lachlan Lonergan (from Tuggeranong Vikings)	Folau Fainga'a; Lachlan Lonergan; Connal McInerney
LK	Rory Arnold; Sam Carter; Murray Douglas; Blake Enever; Darcy Swain	(substituted off) Rory Arnold (to (France) Toulouse); (substituted off) Sam Carter (to (Ireland) Ulster)	(substituted on) Nick Frost (from (New Zealand) Crusaders Development); (substituted on) Cadeyrn Neville (from (Japan) Toyota Industries Shuttles)	Murray Douglas; Blake Enever (did not play); Nick Frost; Cadeyrn Neville; Darcy Swain
FL	Jahrome Brown (short-term); Tom Cusack; David Pocock; Pete Samu; Rob Valetini	(substituted off) David Pocock (to (Japan) Panasonic Wild Knights)	(substituted on) Will Miller (from Waratahs)	Jahrome Brown (did not play); Tom Cusack; Will Miller; Pete Samu; Rob Valetini
N8	Ben Hyne (did not play); Lachlan McCaffrey	(substituted off) Ben Hyne (to (Japan) Sunwolves)		Lachlan McCaffrey
SH	Ryan Lonergan; Matt Lucas; Joe Powell	(substituted off) Matt Lucas (to (Japan) Ricoh Black Rams)	(substituted on) Issak Fines (from Force)	Issak Fines (did not play); Ryan Lonergan; Joe Powell
FH	Wharenui Hawera; Bayley Kuenzle (did not play); Christian Lealiifano; Noah Lolesio (did not play)	(substituted off) Wharenui Hawera (to (Japan) Kubota Spears); (substituted off) Christian Lealiifano (to (Japan) NTT Communications Shining Arcs)	(substituted on) Reesjan Pasitoa (from Nudgee College)	Bayley Kuenzle; Noah Lolesio; Reesjan Pasitoa
CE	Len Ikitau; Jordan Jackson-Hope; Tevita Kuridrani; Irae Simone; Tom Wright	(substituted off) Jordan Jackson-Hope (to (Japan) Sunwolves)	(substituted on) Guy Porter (from Sydney University)	Len Ikitau; Tevita Kuridrani; Guy Porter (did not play); Irae Simone; Tom Wright
WG	Andy Muirhead; Chance Peni; Toni Pulu; Henry Speight; Lausii Taliauli	(substituted off) Chance Peni (to (Japan) Hino Red Dolphins); (substituted off) Henry Speight (to Reds); (substituted off) Lausii Taliauli (to (New Zealand) Southland)	(substituted on) Solomone Kata (from Melbourne Storm)	Solomone Kata; Andy Muirhead; Toni Pulu
FB	Tom Banks; Mack Hansen			Tom Banks; Mack Hansen (did not play)
Coach	Dan McKellar			Dan McKellar

== Rebels ==
Rebels transfers 2019–2020
Pos	2019 squad	Out	In	2020 players
PR	Jermaine Ainsley; Ben Daley (did not play); Mees Erasmus (did not play); Pone Fa'amausili; Tetera Faulkner; Matt Gibbon (development squad); Fereti Sa'aga (did not play); Sam Talakai	(substituted off) Ben Daley (retired); (substituted off) Tetera Faulkner (to Waratahs); (substituted off) Sam Talakai (to (Japan) Suntory Sungoliath)	(substituted on) Cabous Eloff (from (South Africa) Blue Bulls XV); (substituted on) Cameron Orr (from Force); (substituted on) Ruan Smith (from Reds)	Jermaine Ainsley; Cabous Eloff (development squad); Mees Erasmus (did not play); Pone Fa'amausili (did not play); Matt Gibbon; Cameron Orr; Fereti Sa'aga; Ruan Smith
HK	Robbie Abel; Anaru Rangi; Hugh Roach; Jordan Uelese	(substituted off) Robbie Abel (to Waratahs); (substituted off) Hugh Roach (to (New Zealand) Crusaders)	(substituted on) Steven Misa (from (New Zealand) Otago); (substituted on) Declan Moore (from Sydney)	Steven Misa (short-term); Declan Moore (development squad, did not play); Anaru Rangi; Jordan Uelese
LK	Adam Coleman; Esei Ha'angana; Ross Haylett-Petty; Trevor Hosea (did not play); Sam Jeffries; Matt Philip	(substituted off) Adam Coleman (to (England) London Irish); (substituted off) Sam Jeffries (to (Japan) NEC Green Rockets)	(substituted on) Gideon Koegelenberg (from (South Africa) Sharks)	Esei Ha'angana (did not play); Ross Haylett-Petty; Trevor Hosea (did not play); Gideon Koegelenberg; Matt Philip
FL	Angus Cottrell; Richard Hardwick; Luke Jones; Rob Leota; Brad Wilkin		(substituted on) Josh Kemeny (from Sydney); (substituted on) Boyd Killingworth (from Australia Sevens); (substituted on) Michael Wells (from Waratahs)	Angus Cottrell; Richard Hardwick; Luke Jones; Josh Kemeny (did not play); Boyd Killingworth (did not play); Rob Leota; Michael Wells; Brad Wilkin (did not play)
N8	Isi Naisarani			Isi Naisarani
SH	Will Genia; Harrison Goddard; Michael Ruru	(substituted off) Will Genia (to (Japan) Kintetsu Liners); (substituted off) Harrison Goddard (to Gordon); (substituted off) Michael Ruru (to (France) Bayonne)	(substituted on) Frank Lomani (from (Fiji) Fijian Drua); (substituted on) Ryan Louwrens (from (Japan) Kintetsu Liners); (substituted on) Theo Strang (from Melbourne Rising); (substituted on) James Tuttle (from Reds)	Frank Lomani; Ryan Louwrens; Theo Strang (short-term); James Tuttle (did not play)
FH	Quade Cooper; Stuart Dunbar (development squad); Matt To'omua (short-term)	(substituted off) Quade Cooper (to (Japan) Kintetsu Liners); (substituted off) Stuart Dunbar (to Australia Sevens)	(substituted on) Andrew Deegan (from Force)	Andrew Deegan; Matt To'omua
CE	Tom English; Reece Hodge; Campbell Magnay; Bill Meakes; Sione Tuipulotu	(substituted off) Sione Tuipulotu (to (Japan) Yamaha Júbilo)		Tom English; Reece Hodge; Campbell Magnay; Bill Meakes
WG	Marika Koroibete; Semisi Tupou		(substituted on) Andrew Kellaway (from (England) Northampton Saints); (substituted on) Tom Pincus (from (England) Bristol Bears); (substituted on) Harry Potter (from Melbourne Rising)	Andrew Kellaway; Marika Koroibete; Tom Pincus (short-term, did not play); Harry Potter (did not play); Semisi Tupou (did not play)
FB	Dane Haylett-Petty; Jack Maddocks	(substituted off) Jack Maddocks (to Waratahs)		Dane Haylett-Petty
Coach	David Wessels			David Wessels

== Reds ==
Reds transfers 2019–2020
Pos	2019 squad	Out	In	2020 players
PR	Feao Fotuaika; Harry Hoopert; Gavin Luka; JP Smith; Ruan Smith; Taniela Tupou	(substituted off) Gavin Luka (to Queensland Country); (substituted off) Ruan Smith (to Rebels)	(substituted on) David Feao (from Brisbane City); (substituted on) Josh Nasser (from Brisbane City); (substituted on) Jack Straker (from (New Zealand) Northland); (substituted on) Dane Zander (from Brisbane City)	David Feao (development squad, did not play); Feao Fotuaika; Harry Hoopert; Josh Nasser; JP Smith; Jack Straker (short-term, did not play); Taniela Tupou; Dane Zander (short-term)
HK	Efi Ma'afu (did not play); Alex Mafi; Brandon Paenga-Amosa	(substituted off) Efi Ma'afu (to (Japan) Sunwolves)	(substituted on) Ed Craig (from Sydney); (substituted on) Sean Farrell (from Brisbane City)	Ed Craig (short-term); Sean Farrell (did not play); Alex Mafi; Brandon Paenga-Amosa
LK	Angus Blyth; Harry Hockings; Izack Rodda; Lukhan Salakaia-Loto		(substituted on) Tuaina Taii Tualima (from Brisbane City); (substituted on) Michael Wood (from Brisbane City)	Angus Blyth; Harry Hockings; Izack Rodda; Lukhan Salakaia-Loto; Tuaina Taii Tualima (development squad, did not play); Michael Wood (did not play)
FL	Adam Korczyk; Fraser McReight; Angus Scott-Young; Caleb Timu; Harry Wilson (did not play); Liam Wright	(substituted off) Adam Korczyk (to Brisbane City); (substituted off) Caleb Timu (to (France) Montpellier)	(substituted on) Tom Kibble (from Queensland Country)	Tom Kibble (did not play); Fraser McReight; Angus Scott-Young; Harry Wilson; Liam Wright
N8	Scott Higginbotham	(substituted off) Scott Higginbotham (to (France) Bordeaux)	(substituted on) Seru Uru (from Brisbane City)	Seru Uru
SH	Scott Malolua (short-term); Tate McDermott; Moses Sorovi; James Tuttle (did not play)	(substituted off) James Tuttle (to Rebels)		Scott Malolua; Tate McDermott; Moses Sorovi
FH	Matt McGahan; Hamish Stewart; Teti Tela (did not play)	(substituted off) Matt McGahan (to (Japan) Ricoh Black Rams); (substituted off) Teti Tela (to Brisbane City)	(substituted on) Carter Gordon (from Queensland Country)	Carter Gordon (did not play); Hamish Stewart
CE	Chris Feauai-Sautia; Samu Kerevi; Isaac Lucas (short-term); Duncan Paia'aua; Seb Wileman (short-term)	(substituted off) Samu Kerevi (to (Japan) Suntory Sungoliath); (substituted off) Duncan Paia'aua (to (France) Toulon); (substituted off) Seb Wileman (to (New Zealand) Southland)	(substituted on) James O'Connor (from (England) Sale Sharks); (substituted on) Hunter Paisami (from Brisbane City)	Chris Feauai-Sautia; Isaac Lucas; James O'Connor; Hunter Paisami (development squad)
WG	Jock Campbell; Filipo Daugunu; Will Eadie (did not play); Liam McNamara (short-term, did not play); Sefa Naivalu; Jordan Petaia	(substituted off) Will Eadie (to GPS); (substituted off) Sefa Naivalu (to (France) Stade Français); (substituted off) Liam McNamara (to Brisbane City)	(substituted on) Henry Speight (from Brumbies)	Jock Campbell; Filipo Daugunu; Jordan Petaia; Henry Speight
FB	Jack Hardy; Bryce Hegarty; Aidan Toua	(substituted off) Aidan Toua (to (Japan) Honda Heat)		Jack Hardy (did not play); Bryce Hegarty
Coach	Brad Thorn			Brad Thorn

== Waratahs ==
Waratahs transfers 2019–2020
Pos	2019 squad	Out	In	2020 squad
PR	Angus Bell (did not play); Harry Johnson-Holmes; Sekope Kepu; Rory O'Connor; Tom Robertson; Chris Talakai; Shambeckler Vui; Cody Walker (did not play)	(substituted off) Sekope Kepu (to (England) London Irish); (substituted off) Shambeckler Vui (to Brumbies); (substituted off) Cody Walker (to NSW Country Eagles)	(substituted on) Charlie Abel (from Sydney); (substituted on) Darcy Breen (from Sydney University); (substituted on) Tetera Faulkner (from Rebels); (substituted on) Tiaan Tauakipulu (from (New Zealand) St Kentigern's College)	Charlie Abel (did not play); Angus Bell; Darcy Breen (development squad, did not play); Tetera Faulkner; Harry Johnson-Holmes; Rory O'Connor; Tom Robertson; Chris Talakai; Tiaan Tauakipulu (development squad, did not play)
HK	Damien Fitzpatrick; Tolu Latu; Tatafu Polota-Nau (short-term); JP Sauni (did not play); Andrew Tuala	(substituted off) Tolu Latu (to (France) Stade Français); (substituted off) Tatafu Polota-Nau (returned to (England) Leicester Tigers); (substituted off) JP Sauni (to Melbourne Rising)	(substituted on) Robbie Abel (from Rebels); (substituted on) Joe Cotton (from Wests); (substituted on) Tom Horton (from NSW Country Eagles)	Robbie Abel; Joe Cotton (development squad, did not play); Damien Fitzpatrick; Tom Horton (did not play); Andrew Tuala
LK	Ned Hanigan; Jed Holloway; Ryan McCauley; Le Roux Roets (did not play); Rob Simmons; Tom Staniforth; Jeremy Williams (did not play)	(substituted off) Le Roux Roets (to (South Africa) Sharks)	(substituted on) Max Douglas (from Manly)	Max Douglas (development squad, did not play); Ned Hanigan (did not play); Jed Holloway; Ryan McCauley; Rob Simmons; Tom Staniforth; Jeremy Williams (development squad, did not play)
FL	Jack Dempsey; BJ Edwards (did not play); Michael Hooper; Will Miller; Hugh Sinclair; Rory Suttor (did not play); Lachlan Swinton; Michael Wells	(substituted off) BJ Edwards (to Eastern Suburbs); (substituted off) Will Miller (to Brumbies); (substituted off) Rory Suttor (to NSW Country Eagles); (substituted off) Michael Wells (to Rebels)	(substituted on) Charlie Gamble (from Sydney); (substituted on) Carlo Tizzano (from Force)	Jack Dempsey; Charlie Gamble (did not play); Michael Hooper; Hugh Sinclair (did not play); Lachlan Swinton; Carlo Tizzano
N8	Will Harris (did not play); Pat Tafa (did not play)			Will Harris (did not play); Pat Tafa
SH	Jake Gordon; Nick Phipps; Mitch Short (did not play)	(substituted off) Nick Phipps (to (England) London Irish)	(substituted on) Michael McDonald (from Sydney); (substituted on) Henry Robertson (from NSW Country Eagles)	Jake Gordon; Michael McDonald; Henry Robertson (development squad, did not play); Mitch Short
FH	Bernard Foley; Will Harrison (did not play); Mack Mason	(substituted off) Bernard Foley (to (Japan) Kubota Spears)	(substituted on) Jack Walsh (from Manly)	Will Harrison; Mack Mason (did not play); Jack Walsh (development squad, did not play)
CE	Kurtley Beale; Lalakai Foketi; Tautalatasi Tasi (short-term)	(substituted off) Tautalatasi Tasi (to (Japan) Sunwolves)	(substituted on) Tepai Moeroa (from Parramatta Eels); (substituted on) Joey Walton (from NSW Country Eagles)	Kurtley Beale; Lalakai Foketi; Tepai Moeroa; Joey Walton (did not play)
WG	Adam Ashley-Cooper; Cam Clark; John Folau (did not play); Alex Newsome; James Ramm (did not play); Curtis Rona	(substituted off) Adam Ashley-Cooper (to (United States) Austin Gilgronis); (substituted off) John Folau (to Western Sydney Two Blues); (substituted off) Curtis Rona (to (England) London Irish)	(substituted on) Siosifa Lisala (from (Japan) Toyota Industries Shuttles); (substituted on) Mark Nawaqanitawase (from NSW Country Eagles); (substituted on) Triston Reilly (from Australia Sevens)	Cam Clark; Siosifa Lisala; Mark Nawaqanitawase; Alex Newsome; James Ramm; Triston Reilly (development squad, did not play)
FB	Ben Donaldson (did not play); Israel Folau; Karmichael Hunt	(substituted off) Israel Folau (to (France) Catalans Dragons)	(substituted on) Jack Maddocks (from Rebels)	Ben Donaldson (development squad, did not play); Karmichael Hunt; Jack Maddocks
Coach	Daryl Gibson	(substituted off) Daryl Gibson (released)	(substituted on) Rob Penney (from (Japan) Toyota Industries Shuttles)	Rob Penney

== See also ==
- List of 2019–20 Premiership Rugby transfers
- List of 2019–20 Pro14 transfers
- List of 2019–20 Top 14 transfers
- List of 2019–20 RFU Championship transfers
- List of 2019–20 Major League Rugby transfers
- SANZAAR
- Super Rugby franchise areas
