= 2021 Super Rugby AU season =

Men's rugby union club competition

- Countries: Australia
- Tournament format(s): Round-robin and knockout
- Champions: Reds
- Matches played: 22
- Attendance: 208,962 (9,498 per match)
- Tries scored: 118 (5.36 per match)
- Top point scorer(s): James O'Connor, Reds (121)
- Top try scorer(s): Tom Banks, Brumbies (6); Alex Mafi, Reds (6)
- Official website: Official site

The 2021 Super Rugby AU season (branded as Harvey Norman Super Rugby AU for sponsorship reasons) was a professional club rugby union tournament organised by Rugby Australia. Announced on 11 November 2020, the tournament was the second season of Super Rugby AU, featuring the same 5 teams from the inaugural 2020 season, and ran from 19 February to 8 May 2021. The tournament was won by the Reds, who defeated the Brumbies 19–16 in the final at Suncorp Stadium, winning their first Super Rugby AU title, and first Super Rugby competition since 2011.

The tournament ran parallel to New Zealand's 2021 Super Rugby Aotearoa season, and Super Rugby Trans-Tasman followed the conclusion of both seasons, a crossover tournament featuring each Australian team playing each New Zealand team once, followed by a final.

== Law variations ==
The 2021 season of Super Rugby AU saw changes to kick-offs and restarts, with a free kick awarded if the a kickoff had not taken place 30 seconds following the opposition scoring, a restart was kicked out on the full or if teammates of the kicker were not behind the ball. The free kick took place at half way. These rules were similar to those that were being used in Rugby sevens. Also the 'Golden point' law brought in during the 2020 season as tweaked so that full-time would only occur after a try was scored, rather than any form of points. Penalties and drop goals still counted towards the score during extra time, but would not end the game, with play only ending if a try was scored or the 10-minute extra time period ended. All other law changes from the 2020 season also occurred in the 2021 season.

== Regular season ==
=== Standings ===
Pos	Team	Pld	W	D	L	PF	PA	PD	TF	TA	TB	LB	Pts	Qualification
1	Reds	8	7	0	1	271	170	+101	33	18	4	1	33	Grand Final
2	Brumbies	8	6	0	2	267	165	+102	37	15	3	2	29	Qualifying final
3	Force	8	4	0	4	148	193	−45	15	22	0	2	18	Qualifying final
4	Rebels	8	3	0	5	178	182	−4	14	22	0	4	16	
5	Waratahs	8	0	0	8	138	292	−154	15	37	0	3	3	

Source: Super Rugby

=== Round-by-round ===
The table below shows each team's progression throughout the season. For each round, their cumulative points total is shown with the overall log position in brackets:

Team progression
Team	1	2	3	4	5	6	7	8	9	10	QF	GF
Brumbies	4 (2nd)	9 (1st)	14 (1st)	15 (1st)	15 (2nd)	20 (2nd)	24 (2nd)	25 (2nd)	29 (2nd)	29 (2nd)	Won	Lost
Force	0 (4th)	0 (4th)	4 (3rd)	5 (4th)	6 (4th)	6 (4th)	6 (4th)	10 (4th)	14 (3rd)	18 (3rd)	Lost	DNQ
Rebels	0 (3rd)	1 (3rd)	2 (4th)	6 (3rd)	10 (3rd)	10 (3rd)	10 (3rd)	11 (3rd)	12 (4th)	16 (4th)	DNQ	DNQ
Reds	5 (1st)	9 (2nd)	9 (2nd)	13 (2nd)	18 (1st)	23 (1st)	28 (1st)	32 (1st)	32 (1st)	33 (1st)	Bye	Won
Waratahs	0 (5th)	0 (5th)	1 (5th)	1 (5th)	1 (5th)	1 (5th)	2 (5th)	2 (5th)	3 (5th)	3 (5th)	DNQ	DNQ
Key:	Win	Draw	Loss	Bye	DNQ = Did not qualify							

=== Match grid ===
Home \ Away	BRU	FOR	REB	RED	WAR
Brumbies	—	42–14	27–24	38–40	61–10
Force	11–27	—	7–10	30–27	31–30
Rebels	20–26	15–16	—	19–44	33–14
Reds	24–22	26–19	23–21	—	41–7
Waratahs	22–24	16–20	25–36	14–46	—

Source: Super Rugby
Legend: Blue = home team win; Yellow = draw; Red = away team win.

== Matches ==
=== Round 1 ===
19 February 2021
18:45 AEST (UTC+10)

(1 BP) Reds	41–7	Waratahs
Try: Campbell 9' c Mafi 14' c Daugunu (2) 18' c, 71' c Droasese 80+1' c Con: O'Connor (5/5) 10', 16', 19', 72', 80+2'; Pen: O'Connor (2/2) 7', 32'	Report	Try: Gordon 3' c Con: Harrison (1/1) 4'

Lang Park, Brisbane
Attendance: 12,213
Referee: Damon Murphy (Queensland)

19 February 2021
19:00 AWST (UTC+08)

Force	11–27	Brumbies
Try: Cubelli 76' m Pen: Prior (2/2) 5', 36'	Report	Try: Lolesio 21' c Simone 44' c Fines 71' c Con: Lolesio (3/3) 22', 45', 73'; Pen: Lolesio (2/2) 18', 40+1'

Perth Rectangular Stadium, Perth
Attendance: 7,514
Referee: Graham Cooper (Western Australia)

Bye/s: Rebels

=== Round 2 ===
26 February 2021
18:45 AEST (UTC+10)

Reds	23–21	Rebels (1 BP)
Try: Mafi (2) 48' c, 77' c Con: O'Connor (2/2) 49', 78'; Pen: O'Connor (3/4) 22', 40', 62'	Report	Pen: To'omua (6/8) 2', 7, 24', 35', 45', 70'; Hodge (1/2) 53'

Lang Park, Brisbane
Attendance: 10,543
Referee: Jordan Way (Queensland)

27 February 2021
19:45 AEDT (UTC+11)

(1 BP) Brumbies	61–10	Waratahs
Try: Valetini 8' c Hansen (3) 12' m, 56' c, 71' c Lolesio 25' c McInerney 40+2' c White 43' c L. Lonergan 63' c Banks 77' c Con: Lolesio (5/6) 9', 27', 40+3, 45', 58'; R. Lonergan (3/3) 64', 72', 79'	Report	Try: Johnson-Holmes 30' c Con: Harrison (1/1) 31'; Pen: Harrison (1/1) 4'

Canberra Stadium, Canberra
Attendance: 9,322
Referee: Nic Berry (Queensland)

Bye/s: Force

=== Round 3 ===
5 March 2021
19:45 AEDT (UTC+11)

(1 BP) Waratahs	16–20	Force
Try: Porecki 5' c Con: Harrison (1/1) 6'; Pen: Harrison (3/3) 14', 24', 73'	Report	Try: Lee-Warner 32' c Anstee 54' c Con: McIntyre (2/2) 33', 55'; Pen: McIntyre (1/1) 37'; Prior (1/1) 79'

Western Sydney Stadium, Parramatta
Attendance: 4,264
Referee: Nic Berry (Queensland)

6 March 2021
19:45 AEDT (UTC+11)

(1 BP) Brumbies	27–24	Rebels (1 BP)
Try: Ikitau 20' c Penalty try 48'; Banks 72' c Con: Lolesio (1/1) 22'; R. Lonergan (1/1) 73'; Pen: Lolesio (1/1) 5'; R. Lonergan (1/1) 80+4'	Report	Pen: To'omua (8/8) 2', 7', 17', 40+1', 50', 59', 70', 77'

Canberra Stadium, Canberra (Note: The match between the Brumbies and the Rebels was meant to be held at Melbourne Rectangular Stadium, however due to COVID-19 restrictions in Australia the venue was swapped to Canberra Stadium, with the Round 9 fixture now to be played at Melbourne Rectangular Stadium.)
Attendance: 5,713
Referee: Damon Murphy (Queensland)

Bye/s: Reds

=== Round 4 ===
12 March 2021
17:45 AWST (UTC+08)

(1 BP) Force	7–10	Rebels
Try: McGregor 69' c Con: Prior (1/1) 70'	Report	Try: Anderson 27' m Powell 62' m

Perth Rectangular Stadium, Perth
Attendance: 7,762
Referee: Graham Cooper (Western Australia)

13 March 2021
19:45 AEDT (UTC+11)

(1 BP) Brumbies	38–40	Reds
Try: Samu (2) 6' c, 35' c Fainga'a (2) 13' c, 47' c Fines 71' c Con: Lolesio (4/4) 7', 15', 37', 49'; R. Lonergan (1/1) 73'; Pen: Lolesio (1/1) 2'	Report	Try: Vunivalu 30' c Tupou 61' c Wilson 67' c Petaia 78' c Con: O'Connor (4/4) 32', 63', 69', 79'; Pen: O'Connor (4/6) 18', 23', 40', 76'

Canberra Stadium, Canberra
Attendance: 9,384
Referee: Nic Berry (Queensland)

Bye/s: Waratahs

=== Round 5 ===
19 March 2021
19:45 AEDT (UTC+11)

Rebels	33–14	Waratahs
Try: Anderson 13' c To'omua 38' c Uelese 67' c Con: To'omua (2/2) 14', 40'; Hodge (1/1) 69'; Pen: To'omua (3/3) 6', 26', 34'; Hodge (1/1) 56'	Report	Try: Williams 77' c Maddocks 80+1' c Con: Edmed (2/2) 78', 80+2'

Melbourne Rectangular Stadium, Melbourne
Attendance: 5,156
Referee: Nic Berry (Queensland)

20 March 2021
18:45 AEST (UTC+10)

(1 BP) Reds	26–19	Force (1 BP)
Try: McDermott 9' c Paisami (2) 16' c, 52' m Campbell 67' c Con: O'Connor (3/4) 10', 18', 69'	Report	Try: Kaitu'u 20' c Con: McIntyre (1/1) 21'; Pen: McIntyre (4/4) 15', 39', 51', 56'

Suncorp Stadium, Brisbane
Attendance: 12,011
Referee: Damon Murphy (Queensland)

Bye/s: Brumbies

=== Round 6 ===
26 March 2021
19:45 AEDT (UTC+11)

(1 BP) Brumbies	42–14	Force
Try: Ikitau (2) 20' c, 26' c Neville 32' c Muirhead (2) 38' c, 70' c L. Lonergan 58' c Con: Lolesio (5/5) 21', 27', 34', 40', 59'; R. Lonergan (1/1) 71'	Report	Try: Taefu 54' c Prior 65' c Con: Prior (2/2) 55', 66'

Canberra Stadium, Canberra
Attendance: 7,170
Referee: Nic Berry (Queensland)

27 March 2021
19:45 AEDT (UTC+11)

Waratahs	14–46	Reds (1 BP)
Try: Harris 53' m Pen: Harrison (3/3) 3', 6', 39'	Report	Try: McDermott 13' c Salakaia-Loto 29' c Daugunu 40' m Tupou 50' m Mafi (3) 62' c, 67' m, 77' c Con: O'Connor (2/4) 14', 31'; Hegarty (2/3) 63', 78'; Pen: O'Connor (1/1) 36'

Stadium Australia, Sydney
Attendance: 4,381
Referee: Graham Cooper (Western Australia)

Bye/s: Rebels

=== Round 7 ===
2 April 2021
19:45 AEDT (UTC+11)

(1 BP) Waratahs	22–24	Brumbies
Try: Johnson-Holmes 22' c Harrison 65' c Ramm 80+2' m Con: Harrison (2/3) 23', 66'; Pen: Harrison (1/1) 18'	Report	Try: Banks 4' m Wright 14' m Muirhead 26' c Fainga'a 34' c Con: Lolesio (2/4) 27', 35'

Sydney Cricket Ground, Moore Park
Attendance: 7,486
Referee: Graham Cooper (Western Australia)

3 April 2021
19:45 AEDT (UTC+11)

Rebels	19–44	Reds (1 BP)
Try: Lomani 30' c Hodge 36' c Wells 67' m Con: To'omua (2/3) 31', 36'	Report	Try: Tupou (2) 4' c, 17' c Paisami 5' c McReight 46' c Campbell 63' m Flook 77' m Con: O'Connor (4/4) 4', 6', 18', 48'; Pen: O'Connor (2/2) 12', 57'

Melbourne Rectangular Stadium, Melbourne
Attendance: 4,960
Referee: Amy Perrett (New South Wales)

Bye/s: Force

=== Round 8 ===
9 April 2021
19:45 AEST (UTC+10)

(1 BP) Rebels	15–16	Force
Pen: Hodge (1/1) 2'; To'omua (4/5) 14', 22', 46', 63'	Report	Try: Anstee 76' c Con: Miotti (1/1) 78'; Pen: Miotti (3/4) 16', 34', 52'

Melbourne Rectangular Stadium, Melbourne
Attendance: 3,983
Referee: Damon Murphy (Queensland)

10 April 2021
19:45 AEST (UTC+10)

Reds	24–22	Brumbies (1 BP)
Try: Flook 50' c Petaia 65' m Con: O'Connor (1/2) 52'; Pen: O'Connor (4/4) 22', 31', 70', 77'	Report	Try: Fainga'a 6' m Banks 15' c Wright 54' c Con: Lolesio (2/3) 16', 56'; Pen: White (1/1) 40+1'

Lang Park, Brisbane
Attendance: 19,185
Referee: Nic Berry (Queensland)

Bye/s: Waratahs

=== Round 9 ===
17 April 2021
17:45 AWST (UTC+08)

Force	31–30	Waratahs (1 BP)
Try: Robertson 3' c Kaitu'u 25' m Olowofela 72' c Con: Miotti (2/3) 4', 74'; Pen: Miotti (3/4) 8', 51', 80+5'; Drop: Miotti 35'	Report	Try: Harris 16' c Maddocks 43' c Newsome 47' c Con: Donaldson (3/3) 17', 44', 49'; Pen: Donaldson (3/3) 23', 68', 70'

Perth Rectangular Stadium, Perth
Attendance: 9,253
Referee: Amy Perrett (New South Wales)

18 April 2021
14:00 AEST (UTC+10)

(1 BP) Rebels	20–26	Brumbies
Try: Hanson 8' c Powell 43' c Con: To'omua (2/2) 10', 44'; Pen: To'omua (2/2) 49', 72'	Report	Try: Scott 17' c Neville 36' c Wright 40' m Kuenzle 52' c Con: R. Lonergan (2/3) 19', 38'; Lolesio (1/1) 54'

Melbourne Rectangular Stadium, Melbourne (Note: The match between the Rebels and the Brumbies was meant to be held at Canberra Stadium, however due to COVID-19 restrictions in Australia earlier in the year the venue was swapped to Melbourne Rectangular Stadium, with the Round 3 fixture held at Canberra Stadium instead.)
Attendance: 4,755
Referee: Damon Murphy (Queensland)

Bye/s: Reds

=== Round 10 ===
23 April 2021
17:45 AWST (UTC+08)

Force	30–27	Reds (1 BP)
Try: Olowofela (3) 8' c, 7' m, 74' c Kaitu'u 39' m Con: Miotti (2/4) 9', 76'; Pen: Miotti (2/2) 34', 56'	Report	Try: Paisami 5' c Tupou 11' c Daugunu 24' c Con: O'Connor (3/3) 5', 12', 25'; Pen: O'Connor (2/2) 53', 69'

Perth Rectangular Stadium, Perth
Attendance: 6,278
Referee: Damon Murphy (Queensland)

24 April 2021
19:45 AEST (UTC+10)

Waratahs	25–36	Rebels
Try: Nawaqanitawase 31' m Maddocks 38' c Tizzano 49' c Con: Donaldson (2/3) 39', 50'; Pen: Donaldson (2/2) 5', 11'	Report	Try: Ili 1' c Wells 12' m Leota 43' c Gibbon 66' m Con: To'omua (2/4) 3', 44'; Pen: To'omua (4/4) 17', 25', 34', 53'

Western Sydney Stadium, Parramatta
Attendance: 6,996
Referee: Nic Berry (Queensland)

Bye/s: Brumbies

== Finals ==
=== Bracket ===
Qualifying final
1 May – Canberra
Brumbies	21
Force	9

Grand Final
19 September – Brisbane
Reds	19
Brumbies	16

=== Qualifying final ===
1 May 2021
19:45 AEST (UTC+10)

Brumbies	21–9	Force
Try: Wright 36' c Banks 40+2' m Con: Lolesio (1/2) 38'; Pen: Loleiso (1/1) 61'; R. Lonergan (2/2) 73', 78'	Report	Pen: Miotti (3/3) 35', 46', 69'

Canberra Stadium, Canberra
Attendance: 8,996
Referee: Nic Berry (Queensland)

=== Grand Final ===
8 May 2021
19:45 AEST (UTC+10)

Reds	19–16	Brumbies
Try: O'Connor 80+5' c Con: O'Connor (1/1) 80+7'; Pen: O'Connor (4/5) 3', 30', 51', 64'	Report; Summary	Try: Banks 13' c Con: Lolesio (1/1) 14'; Pen: Lolesio (3/3) 32', 40', 71'

Lang Park, Brisbane
Attendance: 41,637
Referee: Nic Berry (Queensland)

Reds	Brumbies

FB	15	Bryce Hegarty
RW	14	Jordan Petaia	(substituted off) 64'
OC	13	Josh Flook
IC	12	Hamish Stewart
LW	11	Jock Campbell
FH	10	James O'Connor (c)
SH	9	Tate McDermott	(substituted off) 71'
N8	8	Harry Wilson	(substituted off) 45'
OF	7	Fraser McReight
BF	6	Angus Scott-Young
RL	5	Lukhan Salakaia-Loto
LL	4	Ryan Smith	(substituted off) 71'
TP	3	Taniela Tupou
HK	2	Brandon Paenga-Amosa	(substituted off) 54'
LP	1	Feao Fotuaika	(substituted off) 54'
Substitutes:
HK	16	Alex Mafi	(substituted on) 54'
PR	17	Dane Zander	(substituted on) 54'
PR	18	Zane Nonggorr
LK	19	Seru Uru	(substituted on) 71'
LF	20	Liam Wright	(substituted on) 45'
SH	21	Kalani Thomas	(substituted on) 71'
CE	22	Isaac Henry
OB	23	Filipo Daugunu	(substituted on) 64'
Coach:
Brad Thorn

FB	15	Tom Banks
RW	14	Andy Muirhead		(substituted off) 35'
OC	13	Len Ikitau
IC	12	Irae Simone
LW	11	Tom Wright
FH	10	Noah Lolesio
SH	9	Nic White		(substituted off) 72'
N8	8	Rob Valetini	(yellow card) 61' to 72'
OF	7	Rory Scott		(substituted off) 72'
BF	6	Nick Frost
RL	5	Cadeyrn Neville		(substituted off) 65'
LL	4	Darcy Swain	(yellow card) 78'
TP	3	Allan Alaalatoa (c)
HK	2	Lachlan Lonergan		(substituted off) 56'
LP	1	Scott Sio		(substituted off) 67'
Substitutes:
HK	16	Folau Fainga'a		(substituted on) 56'
PR	17	Harry Lloyd		(substituted on) 67'
PR	18	Tom Ross
LF	19	Henry Stowers		(substituted on) 65'
LF	20	Luke Reimer	(yellow card) 80+1'	(substituted on) 72'
SH	21	Ryan Lonergan		(substituted on) 72'
FH	22	Reesjan Pasitoa
OB	23	Mack Hansen		(substituted on) 35'
Coach:
Dan McKellar

Man of the Match:
James O'Connor (Reds)

Assistant Referees:
Damon Murphy (Queensland)
Amy Perrett (New South Wales)
Television match official:
James Leckie (New South Wales)

== Statistics ==
As of 8 May 2021.

=== Leading point scorers ===
No.	Player	Team	Points	Average	Details
1	James O'Connor	Reds	121	13.44	1 T, 25 C, 22 P, 0 D
2	Matt To'omua	Rebels	102	12.75	1 T, 8 C, 27 P, 0 D
3	Noah Lolesio	Brumbies	84	8.40	2 T, 24 C, 9 P, 0 D
4	Domingo Miotti	Force	46	9.20	0 T, 5 C, 11 P, 1 D
5	Will Harrison	Waratahs	39	6.50	1 T, 4 C, 8 P, 0 D
6	Tom Banks	Brumbies	30	3.00	6 T, 0 C, 0 P, 0 D
6	Alex Mafi	Reds	30	3.33	6 T, 0 C, 0 P, 0 D
8	Ben Donaldson	Waratahs	25	12.50	0 T, 5 C, 5 P, 0 D
8	Ryan Lonergan	Brumbies	25	3.13	0 T, 8 C, 3 P, 0 D
8	Taniela Tupou	Reds	25	3.13	5 T, 0 C, 0 P, 0 D

Source: Points

=== Leading try scorers ===
No.	Player	Team	Tries	Average
1	Tom Banks	Brumbies	6	0.60
1	Alex Mafi	Reds	6	0.67
3	Taniela Tupou	Reds	5	0.56
4	Filipo Daugunu	Reds	4	0.50
4	Folau Fainga'a	Brumbies	4	0.50
4	Jordan Olowofela	Force	4	0.80
4	Hunter Paisami	Reds	4	0.50
4	Tom Wright	Brumbies	4	0.80
9	Jock Campbell	Reds	3	0.38
9	Mack Hansen	Brumbies	3	0.30
9	Len Ikitau	Brumbies	3	0.30
9	Feleti Kaitu'u	Force	3	0.33
9	Andy Muirhead	Brumbies	3	0.30
9	Jack Maddocks	Waratahs	3	0.38

Source: Tries

=== Discipline ===
Player	Team	Red	Yellow	Round (vs. Opponent)
Toni Pulu	Force	1	1	Qualifier (vs. Brumbies); Round 10 (vs. Reds)
Allan Alaalatoa	Brumbies	1	0	Round 3 (vs. Rebels)
Tom Cusack	Brumbies	1	0	Round 7 (vs. Waratahs)
Pone Fa'amausili	Rebels	1	0	Round 10 (vs. Waratahs)
Feao Fotuaika	Reds	1	0	Round 2 (vs. Rebels)
Ross Haylett-Petty	Rebels	1	0	Round 4 (vs. Force)
Isi Naisarani	Rebels	1	0	Round 10 (vs. Waratahs)
Izaia Perese	Waratahs	1	0	Round 1 (vs. Reds)
Andrew Ready	Force	1	0	Round 3 (vs. Waratahs)
James Hanson	Rebels	0	2	Round 3 (vs. Brumbies); Round 10 (vs. Waratahs)
Tevita Kuridrani	Force	0	2	Round 6 (vs. Brumbies); Round 10 (vs. Reds)
Trevor Hosea	Rebels	0	1	Round 9 (vs. Brumbies)
Kane Koteka	Force	0	1	Round 8 (vs. Rebels)
Marika Koroibete	Rebels	0	1	Round 9 (vs. Brumbies)
Harry Lloyd	Brumbies	0	1	Round 6 (vs. Force)
Andy Muirhead	Brumbies	0	1	Round 3 (vs. Rebels)
Zane Nonggorr	Reds	0	1	Round 6 (vs. Waratahs)
Jordan Petaia	Reds	0	1	Round 10 (vs. Force)
Luke Reimer	Brumbies	0	1	Final (vs. Reds)
Rory Scott	Brumbies	0	1	Round 7 (vs. Waratahs)
Hugh Sinclair	Waratahs	0	1	Round 6 (vs. Reds)
James Slipper	Brumbies	0	1	Round 1 (vs. Force)
Darcy Swain	Brumbies	0	1	Final (vs. Reds)
Lachlan Swinton	Waratahs	0	1	Round 9 (vs. Force)
Jeremy Thrush	Force	0	1	Round 10 (vs. Reds)
Rob Valetini	Brumbies	0	1	Final (vs. Reds)

== Players ==
=== Squads ===
The following 2021 Super Rugby AU squads have been named. Players listed in italics denote non-original squad members.

Brumbies squad
Forwards	Allan Alaalatoa • Jahrome Brown • Tom Cusack • Folau Fainga'a • Nick Frost • Archer Holz • Tom Hooper • Fred Kaihea • Sefo Kautai • Harry Lloyd • Lachlan Lonergan • Connal McInerney • Will Miller • Cadeyrn Neville • Billy Pollard • Luke Reimer • Tom Ross • Pete Samu • Rory Scott • Scott Sio • James Slipper • Henry Stowers • Darcy Swain • James Tucker • Rob Valetini
Backs	Lachlan Albert • Tom Banks • Issak Fines • Mack Hansen • Len Ikitau • Solomone Kata • Bayley Kuenzle • Noah Lolesio • Ryan Lonergan • Andy Muirhead • Reesjan Pasitoa • Irae Simone • Reece Tapine • Nic White • Tom Wright
Coach	Dan McKellar

Force squad
Forwards	Bo Abra • Tim Anstee • Ollie Callan • Victor Harris • Chris Heiberg • Greg Holmes • Feleti Kaitu'u • Kane Koteka • Fergus Lee-Warner • Tomás Lezana • Kieran Longbottom • Ryan McCauley • Santiago Medrano • Jackson Pugh • Andrew Ready • Tom Robertson • Brynard Stander • Jeremy Thrush • Sitaleki Timani • Angus Wagner • Jack Winchester
Backs	Marcel Brache • Tomás Cubelli • Kyle Godwin • Richard Kahui • Rob Kearney • Tevita Kuridrani • Brad Lacey • Jono Lance • Grason Makara • Michael McDonald • Jack McGregor • Jake McIntyre • Domingo Miotti • Jordan Olowofela • Jonah Placid • Ian Prior • Toni Pulu • Byron Ralston • Jake Strachan • Henry Taefu
Coach	Tim Sampson

Rebels squad
Forwards	Albert Anae • Ignacio Calas • Ed Craig • Steve Cummins • Cabous Eloff • Pone Fa'amausili • Matt Gibbon • James Hanson • Richard Hardwick • Ross Haylett-Petty • Trevor Hosea • Isaac Aedo Kailea • Josh Kemeny • Rob Leota • Isi Naisarani • Tom Nowlan • Cameron Orr • Jeral Skelton • Lucio Sordoni • Jordan Uelese • Rhys van Nek • Michael Wells • Brad Wilkin
Backs	Lachie Anderson • Carter Gordon • Dane Haylett-Petty • Reece Hodge • Lewis Holland • Stacey Ili • Marika Koroibete • Frank Lomani • Campbell Magnay • Tom Pincus • Joe Powell • Theo Strang • Matt To'omua • James Tuttle • Glen Vaihu • Ilikena Vudogo • Young Tonumaipea • George Worth
Coach	David Wessels

Reds squad
Forwards	Richie Asiata • Angus Blyth • Matt Faessler • Feao Fotuaika • Ben Grant • Harry Hoopert • Alex Mafi • Fraser McReight • Josh Nasser • Zane Nonggorr • Brandon Paenga-Amosa • Lukhan Salakaia-Loto • Angus Scott-Young • Ryan Smith • Tuaina Taii Tualima • Taniela Tupou • Seru Uru • Sam Wallis • Harry Wilson • Liam Wright • Dane Zander
Backs	Jock Campbell • Hudson Creighton • Lawson Creighton • Filipo Daugunu • Ilaisa Droasese • Josh Flook • Mac Grealy • Bryce Hegarty • Isaac Henry • Tate McDermott • James O'Connor • Hunter Paisami • Jordan Petaia • Moses Sorovi • Hamish Stewart • Kalani Thomas • Suliasi Vunivalu
Coach	Brad Thorn

Waratahs squad
Forwards	Robbie Abel • Angus Bell • Darcy Breen • Sam Caird • Joe Cotton • Jack Dempsey • Max Douglas • Tetera Faulkner • George Francis • Charlie Gamble • Will Harris • Tom Horton • Harry Johnson-Holmes • Dave Porecki • Hugh Sinclair • Lachlan Swinton • Chris Talakai • Alefosio Tatola • Tiaan Tauakipulu • Carlo Tizzano • Jack Whetton • Jeremy Williams • Michael Wood • Sam Wykes
Backs	Ben Donaldson • Tane Edmed • Lalakai Foketi • Jake Gordon • Jack Grant • Will Harrison • Jack Maddocks • Tepai Moeroa • Mark Nawaqanitawase • Alex Newsome • Izaia Perese • James Ramm • Triston Reilly • Henry Robertson • Joey Walton
Coach	Jason Gilmore • Rob Penney • Chris Whitaker

== Referees ==
The following referees were selected to officiate the 2021 Super Rugby AU season:

2021 Super Rugby AU referees
- Nic Berry
- Graham Cooper
- Damon Murphy
- Amy Perrett
- Jordan Way
