= Jack Straker =

New Zealand rugby union player

- Born: 13 April 1993 (age 33) Australia
- Height: 187 cm (6 ft 2 in)
- Weight: 117 kg (258 lb; 18 st 6 lb)

Rugby union career
- Position: Prop
Senior career
Years	Team	Apps	(Points)
2017	Tasman	3	(0)
2017	Canterbury	1	(0)
2018–	Northland	19	(5)
- Correct as of 14 March 2020
Super Rugby
Years	Team	Apps	(Points)
2020–	Reds	0	(0)
- Correct as of 14 March 2020

Jack Straker (born 13 April 1993 in Australia) is an Australian rugby union player who plays for the Queensland Reds in Super Rugby. His playing position is prop. He was a late inclusion in the Reds squad for round 7 in 2020.
