= Albert Anae =

Samoa international rugby union player

- Born: 21 June 1989 (age 37) Wellington, New Zealand
- Height: 185 cm (6 ft 1 in)
- Weight: 117 kg (18 st 6 lb)
- School: Ipswich Grammar School

Rugby union career
- Position: Hooker / Prop
Amateur team(s)
| Years | Team | Apps | (Points) |
| 2011 | Sunnybank | | |
Senior career
| Years | Team | Apps | (Points) |
| 2014–15 | Benetton | 20 | (0) |
| 2015 | Canberra Vikings | 8 | (5) |
| 2016−2020 | Mitsubishi DynaBoars | 28 | (30) |
| 2022 | Shimizu Koto Blue Sharks | 0 | (0) |
- Correct as of 23 December 2021
Provincial / State sides
| Years | Team | Apps | (Points) |
| 2013 | Bay of Plenty | 6 | (0) |
| 2021– | Auckland | 0 | (0) |
- Correct as of 26 October 2021
Super Rugby
| Years | Team | Apps | (Points) |
| 2011–14 2022 | Reds | 27 | (5) |
| 2016 | Brumbies | 0 | (0) |
| 2021 | Rebels | 1 | (0) |
- Correct as of 22 November 2021
International career
| Years | Team | Apps | (Points) |
| 2006 | Australian Schoolboys | | |
| 2007 | Australia U19 | 4 | (0) |
| 2008–2009 | Australia U20 | 10 | (10) |
| 2021– | Samoa | 0 | (0) |
- Correct as of 26 October 2021

Albert Anae (born 21 June 1989) is a rugby union footballer who plays professionally for the Mitsubishi Sagamihara DynaBoars in the Japanese Top League. He usually plays as a prop or hooker. Anae previously played for the Queensland Reds, and Italian club Benetton.

== Early life ==
Of Samoan heritage, Anae was born in Wellington, New Zealand, where he was introduced to rugby at the Upper Hutt Rugby Football Club by his father Sio. He moved to Brisbane with his family at a young age.

Anae attended Ipswich Grammar School and was selected to represent Queensland at the Australian Schools Rugby Championships as a prop in 2006. He went on to play for Australian Schools, U19s and U20s.

Anae was selected to join the Queensland Reds Development tour of Ireland and France at the end of 2007. He made his Australian under-20 debut in 2008 at the inaugural IRB Junior World Championship in Wales.

== Rugby career ==
Anae played his first Super Rugby match for the Reds against the Hurricanes in Wellington in 2011, the year that the Reds won the Super Rugby Championship. Later that season he played for Sunnybank in the Queensland Premier Rugby competition, defeating Brothers in the grand final.

In 2012, Anae was selected in the Reds Extended Player Squad (EPS), and developed his skills to be capable of playing all three front-row positions. Following injuries to Saia Fainga'a and James Hanson, he was selected at hooker against the Western Force at Suncorp Stadium in round two. The Reds won the game 35–20 with Anae excelling when given the opportunity. He finished the season with five caps.

In 2013, after signing a full-time contract, Anae earned a further eleven caps with the Reds. He travelled to New Zealand in August of that year to play for Bay of Plenty in the ITM Cup when he was called up to the Wallabies squad to replace the injured Tatafu Polota-Nau.

Albert played the final game of his Qld Reds career at the conclusion of the 2014 Super 15 regular season. He played for the Benetton club in Italy for a season before returning to Australia in 2015 to play for the Canberra Vikings and Brumbies. He did not make any appearances for the Brumbies and was released during the 2016 Super Rugby season to join Japanese team Mitsubishi Sagamihara DynaBoars.

== Super Rugby statistics ==
As of 12 June 2021

| Season | Team | Games | Starts | Sub | Mins | Tries | Cons | Pens | Drops | Points | Yel | Red |
|---|---|---|---|---|---|---|---|---|---|---|---|---|
| 2011 | Reds | 1 | 0 | 1 | 8 | 0 | 0 | 0 | 0 | 0 | 0 | 0 |
| 2012 | Reds | 4 | 1 | 3 | 107 | 0 | 0 | 0 | 0 | 0 | 0 | 0 |
| 2013 | Reds | 10 | 1 | 9 | 271 | 0 | 0 | 0 | 0 | 0 | 0 | 0 |
| 2014 | Reds | 10 | 0 | 10 | 131 | 1 | 0 | 0 | 0 | 5 | 0 | 0 |
| 2016 | Brumbies | 0 | 0 | 0 | 0 | 0 | 0 | 0 | 0 | 0 | 0 | 0 |
| 2021 AU | Rebels | 1 | 0 | 1 | 19 | 0 | 0 | 0 | 0 | 0 | 0 | 0 |
| 2021 TT | Rebels | 0 | 0 | 0 | 0 | 0 | 0 | 0 | 0 | 0 | 0 | 0 |
| Total | | 26 | 2 | 24 | 536 | 1 | 0 | 0 | 0 | 5 | 0 | 0 |
