= Sean Farrell (rugby union) =

Australian rugby union player

- Born: Australia
- Height: 187 cm (6 ft 2 in)
- Weight: 106 kg (234 lb; 16 st 10 lb)

Rugby union career
- Position: Hooker
Senior career
Years	Team	Apps	(Points)
2017	Queensland Country	1	(0)
2018–2019	Brisbane City	7	(5)
- Correct as of 4 November 2019
Super Rugby
Years	Team	Apps	(Points)
2020	Reds	3	(0)
- Correct as of 4 November 2019

Sean Farrell (born in Australia) is an Australian rugby union player who plays for the Queensland Reds in Super Rugby. His playing position is hooker. He played in 3 games for the Reds squad in 2020.
