= Tim Anstee =

Australian rugby union player

- Born: 19 May 1997 (age 29) Sydney, New South Wales, Australia
- Height: 193 cm (6 ft 4 in)
- Weight: 106 kg (234 lb; 16 st 10 lb)

Rugby union career
- Position: Flanker
- Current team: Worcester Warriors
Senior career
Years	Team	Apps	(Points)
2021–2024	Western Force	46	(25)
2025	RFC Los Angeles	16	(25)
2025–	Worcester Warriors	19	(35)
- Correct as of 16 March 2026
National sevens team
Years	Team		Comps
2016–2020	Australia		24 (0)
- Correct as of 15 February 2021
Medal record
Boy's rugby sevens
Representing Australia
Commonwealth Youth Games
Silver medal – second place	2015 Apia	Team competition

Tim Anstee (born 19 May 1997 in Australia) is an Australian rugby union player who plays for the Worcester Warriors in the Champ Rugby. His playing position is flanker. He was named in the Force squad for the 2021 Super Rugby AU season. He had previously represented the Australia Sevens team at 24 competitions between 2016 and 2020. Tim was nominated for Cosmopolitan Bachelor of the Year in 2017.

On 19 May 2025, Anstee confirms his move to England to join re-vamped Worcester Warriors in the Champ Rugby for the 2025-26 season.
