= Sam Wallis =

Australian rugby union player

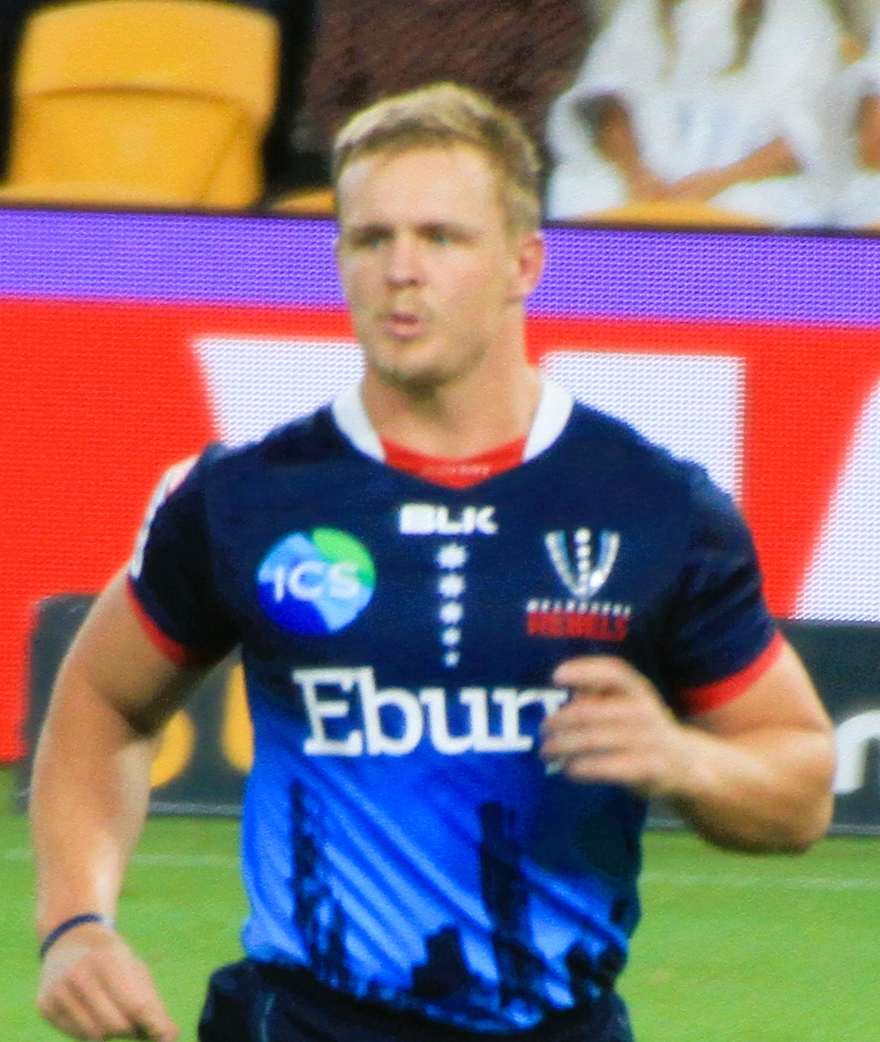
- Wallis playing for the Rebels in 2022
- Born: 4 May 1998 (age 28) Australia
- Height: 185 cm (6 ft 1 in)
- Weight: 106 kg (234 lb; 16 st 10 lb)

Rugby union career
- Position: Flanker
- Current team: Rebels
Senior career
Years	Team	Apps	(Points)
2018–2019	Brisbane City	14	(25)
2021	Reds	2	(0)
2022-23	Rebels	8	(0)
- Correct as of 24 Feb 2026

Sam Wallis is an Australian rugby union player who plays for the Rebels in Super Rugby. His playing position is flanker. He made his run on debut for the Rebels in Round 1 of the 2022 Super Rugby Pacific Season. Previously he was a member of the Reds squad for the 2021 Super Rugby AU season, making 2 appearances. He previously represented the Brisbane City in the 2018 & 2019 National Rugby Championship.

== Super Rugby statistics ==
As of 30 May 2022

Season	Team	Games	Starts	Sub	Mins	Tries	Cons	Pens	Drops	Points	Yel	Red
2021 AU	Reds	1	0	1	12	0	0	0	0	0	0	0
2021 TT	Reds	1	0	1	13	0	0	0	0	0	0	0
2022	Rebels	8	2	6	255	0	0	0	0	0	0	0
Total		10	2	8	280	0	0	0	0	0	0	0
