= Tom Nowlan =

Australian rugby union player

- Full name: Thomas Nowlan
- Born: 8 December 1997 (age 28) Australia
- Height: 1.99 m (6 ft 6 in)
- Weight: 121 kg (267 lb)

Rugby union career
- Position: Lock
- Current team: Rangers Vicenza
Senior career
Years	Team	Apps	(Points)
2017–2024	Randwick	60	(25)
2019	NSW Country Eagles	1	(0)
2021–2022	Rebels	5	(0)
2022–2023	Shimizu Blue Sharks	10	(0)
2024–	Rangers Vicenza		
- Correct as of 9 September 2022

Tom Nowlan is an Australian rugby union player who plays for the Rangers Vicenza in Italian Serie A Elite. His playing position is lock.

In Spring 2021, he was named in the Rebels squad for Round 3 of the 2021 Super Rugby AU season. He played for Rebels in Super Rugby also in 2022 Super Rugby season He previously represented NSW Country Eagles in the 2019 National Rugby Championship.

== Super Rugby statistics ==
As of 30 May 2022

Season	Team	Games	Starts	Sub	Mins	Tries	Cons	Pens	Drops	Points	Yel	Red
2021 AU	Rebels	3	0	3	57	0	0	0	0	0	0	0
2021 TT	Rebels	0	0	0	0	0	0	0	0	0	0	0
2022	Rebels	2	0	2	28	0	0	0	0	0	0	0
Total		5	0	5	85	0	0	0	0	0	0	0
