= George Francis (rugby union) =

Australian rugby union player

- Born: 12 September 1998 (age 28) Australia
- Height: 180 cm (5 ft 11 in)
- Weight: 119 kg (262 lb; 18 st 10 lb)

Rugby union career
- Position: Prop
- Current team: Waratahs
Senior career
Years	Team	Apps	(Points)
2018	Canberra Vikings	1	(0)
2019	Queensland Country	4	(5)
2021–	Waratahs	0	(0)
- Correct as of 17 March 2021
International career
Years	Team	Apps	(Points)
2018	Australia U20	5	(5)
- Correct as of 17 March 2021

George Francis (born 12 September 1998 in Australia) is an Australian rugby union player who plays for the Waratahs in Super Rugby. His playing position is prop. He was named in the Waratahs squad for Round 5 of the 2021 Super Rugby AU season. He previously represented Canberra Vikings in the 2018 National Rugby Championship and the Queensland Country in the 2019 National Rugby Championship.
