= Lucio Sordoni =

Argentine rugby union player

- Born: 23 July 1998 (age 28) Rosario, Argentina
- Height: 6 ft 3 in (1.91 m)
- Weight: 273 lb (124 kg; 19 st 7 lb)

Rugby union career
- Position: Prop
Amateur team(s)
Years	Team	Apps	(Points)
2017	Club Atlético del Rosario	10	(10)
-	Southern Districts		
Senior career
Years	Team	Apps	(Points)
2019	Jaguares XV	8	(10)
2022	Mont-de-Marsan		
2022-24	Glasgow Warriors	31	(5)
2024-	Racing 92		
Super Rugby
Years	Team	Apps	(Points)
2019–20	Jaguares	3	(0)
2021	Rebels	7	(0)
International career
Years	Team	Apps	(Points)
2018	Argentina Under 20	5	(0)
2018	Argentina XV	2	(0)
2018–	Argentina	3	(0)

Lucio Sordoni (born 23 July 1998) is an Argentina international rugby union player. He plays for Racing 92. He previously for Glasgow Warriors in the United Rugby Championship and the Jaguares.

== Rugby Union career ==
=== Amateur career ===
Sordoni started played rugby union for Club Atlético del Rosario. He has also played for Southern Districts in Australia.

=== Professional career ===
Sordoni played for the Jaguares. On 28 December 2018, Sordoni was named in the Jaguares squad for the 2019 Super Rugby season.

Sordoni played for the Melbourne Rebels in 2021.

Sordoni was signed by French club Mont de Marsan in 2022 but did not play due to injury.

On 3 August 2022 Sordoni was signed by Glasgow Warriors in a short-term deal. He played 31 times for the Glasgow giant, scoring one try. He is Glasgow Warrior No. 341. During his last season with the Warriors, the club won the United Rugby Championship.

On 27 August 2024 it was announced that Sordoni was signed by French club Racing 92.

==== Super Rugby statistics ====
Season	Team	Games	Starts	Sub	Mins	Tries	Cons	Pens	Drops	Points	Yel	Red
2019	Jaguares	2	1	1	60	0	0	0	0	0	0	0
2020	Jaguares	1	1	0	56	0	0	0	0	0	0	0
2021 AU	Rebels	4	0	4	89	0	0	0	0	0	0	0
2021 TT	Rebels	3	0	3	63	0	0	0	0	0	0	0
Total		10	2	8	268	0	0	0	0	0	0	0

=== International career ===
Sordoni played for Argentina in the 2020 Rugby Championship.
