= Sefo Kautai =

NZ rugby union player

- Full name: Sosefo Siulangapo Vito Kautai
- Born: 16 August 1996 (age 30) New Zealand
- Height: 1.89 m (6 ft 2 in)
- Weight: 133 kg (20 st 13 lb; 293 lb)
- School: Sacred Heart College

Rugby union career
- Position: Tighthead Prop
- Current team: Highlanders, Waikato
Senior career
| Years | Team | Apps | (Points) |
| 2016– | Waikato | 41 | (5) |
| 2017–2019 | Chiefs | 11 | (0) |
| 2019–2020 | Kobelco Steelers | 0 | (0) |
| 2020–2024 | Brumbies | 41 | (5) |
| 2024– | Highlanders | 17 | (10) |
- Correct as of 3 November 2016
International career
| Years | Team | Apps | (Points) |
| 2016 | New Zealand Under-20 | 5 | (0) |
- Correct as of 3 November 2016

Sefo Kautai (born 16 August 1996) is a New Zealand rugby union player who previously played as a tighthead prop for Waikato in New Zealand's domestic Mitre 10 Cup and for the Chiefs in the international Super Rugby competition. He is currently playing for Kobelco Steelers rugby club - which is based in Kobe, Japan.

== Senior career ==
Kautai debuted for Waikato in a Ranfurly Shield defense against King Country in July 2016 and went on to make 11 appearances for the province throughout 2016, scoring one try in the process.

== Super Rugby ==
Kautai's impressive performances anchoring Waikato's scrum saw him earn a Super Rugby contract with Hamilton-based franchise, the Chiefs ahead of the 2017 Super Rugby season.

== International ==
Kautai was a member of the New Zealand Under-20 side which competed in the 2016 World Rugby Under 20 Championship in England, making 5 appearances.
