= James Hanson (rugby union) =

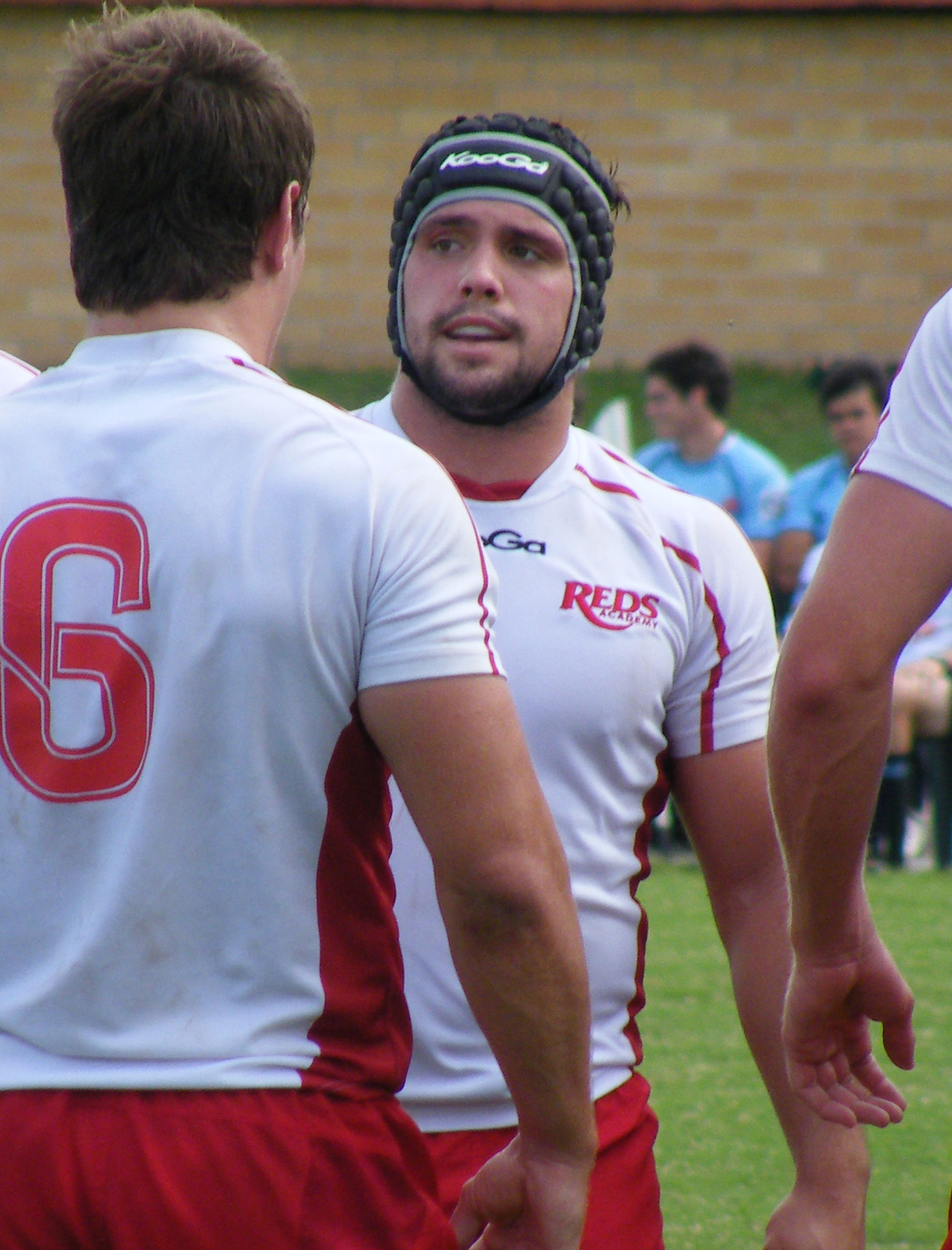
- Hanson in 2010
- Born: James Hanson; 15 September 1988 (age 38) Brisbane, Queensland, Australia
- Height: 1.83 m (6 ft 0 in)
- Weight: 104 kg (16 st 5 lb; 229 lb)
- School: Gregory Terrace
- University: University of Queensland

Rugby union career
- Position: Hooker
Senior career
Years	Team	Apps	(Points)
2007	Rebels (ARC)	6	(10)
2009	North Harbour	7	(0)
2014	Brisbane City	1	(0)
2015	Sydney Stars	3	(5)
2016–2017	Melbourne Rising	3	(5)
2017–2021	Gloucester	32	(35)
- Correct as of 15 February 2021
Super Rugby
Years	Team	Apps	(Points)
2009–2015	Reds	82	(30)
2016–2017	Rebels	29	(5)
2021–2022	Rebels	24	(25)
- Correct as of 30 May 2022
International career
Years	Team	Apps	(Points)
2012–2017	Australia	12	(0)
2006–2007	Australia U-19		
2005	Australia Schools		
- Correct as of 22 October 2016
Medal record
Men's rugby union
Representing Australia
Rugby World Cup
Silver medal – second place	2015 England	Squad

James Hanson (born 15 September 1988) is an Australian rugby union player for playing as a hooker. He recently played for English Premiership Rugby side Gloucester.

== Early life ==
Hanson was born in Brisbane. He played schoolboy rugby at Gregory Terrace and was selected for the Australian Schools team in 2005.

Hanson played his first senior rugby with the University club and was selected for the Australia Under 19 rugby team in 2006 and 2007.

== Career ==
Hanson played in the Australian Rugby Championship for the Melbourne Rebels in 2007. He signed a development contract with the Queensland Reds, and made his Super Rugby debut for the Reds in 2009. He played off the bench in Queensland's win over the Crusaders in the Super Rugby final of 2011, and went on to play seven seasons at the Reds.

Hanson made his Wallabies debut at Suncorp Stadium Brisbane, Queensland on 20 October 2012. The result was an 18–18 draw with the All-Blacks in the final Bledisloe Cup match of the season.

Hanson signed with the Rebels in 2016 to play Super Rugby in Melbourne.

Hanson signed a short-term deal with English club Gloucester in the Aviva Premiership until the end of the year 2017, with an initial plan to rejoin the Rebels. However, on 13 December 2017, it was announced that Hanson had signed a permanent deal to stay at Gloucester following agreement by the Melbourne Rebels to release him early from his contract. He was granted early release from Gloucester in February 2021.

Hanson has signed a 1-year contract back at the Melbourne Rebels for the 2021 Super Rugby AU season.

== Super Rugby statistics ==
As of 30 May 2022

Season	Team	Games	Starts	Sub	Min	T	C	PG	DG	Pts	YC	RC
2009	Reds	0	0	0	0	0	0	0	0	0	0	0
2010	Reds	1	0	1	5	0	0	0	0	0	0	0
2011	Reds	18	2	16	398	2	0	0	0	10	0	0
2012	Reds	16	9	7	773	2	0	0	0	10	0	0
2013	Reds	15	5	10	530	0	0	0	0	0	0	0
2014	Reds	16	10	6	692	2	0	0	0	10	1	0
2015	Reds	16	10	6	826	0	0	0	0	0	0	0
2016	Rebels	15	14	1	904	1	0	0	0	5	0	0
2017	Rebels	14	12	2	810	0	0	0	0	0	1	0
2021 AU	Rebels	7	5	1	361	1	0	0	0	5	2	0
2021 TT	Rebels	5	0	5	103	0	0	0	0	0	0	0
2022	Rebels	12	5	7	426	4	0	0	0	20	0	0
Total		134	72	62	5,837	13	0	0	0	65	4	0
