= Lachie Albert =

Australian rugby union player

- Full name: Lachlan Albert
- Born: Sydney, Australia
- Height: 186 cm (6 ft 1 in)
- Weight: 89 kg (196 lb)
- School: St Ignatius' College, Riverview

Rugby union career
- Position: Scrum-half
Super Rugby
Years	Team	Apps	(Points)
2022	Brumbies	1	(0)

Lachlan Albert is an Australian professional rugby union player.

Albert, a scrum-half, attended Sydney's St Ignatius' College Riverview and toured the United Kingdom with the Australian Schools side in 2018, before earning further representative honours with Australian under-20s selection and enjoying more rugby with BTFA.

Signed by the ACT Brumbies in 2019, Albert made his only Super Rugby appearance during the 2022 season, as the reserve scrum-half against the Force in Perth, with Nic White opting to stay home due to the birth of his child.

Albert began playing rugby in New Zealand in 2024. Spending time with the Highlander Bravehearts in the early stages, Albert debuted for the Southland Stags in their win over Otago. Albert made 9 appearances for Southland before moving back to Australia.

== See also ==
- List of ACT Brumbies players
