= Jason Gilmore =

Australian rugby union coach

- Born: Australia
- School: Anglican Church Grammar School
- University: Queensland University of Technology

Rugby union career
- Position: Head Coach
- Current team: Harlequins
Coaching career
- Years: Team
- 2008–2010: Junior Reds
- 2010–2012: Toowoomba Grammar School
- 2013–2014: Anglican Church Grammar School
- 2014–2016: Queensland Reds (elite development coach)
- 2016–2017: Queensland Reds (assistant coach)
- 2017–2020: Australia U20
- 2020–2024: Waratahs (assistant coach & defence coach)
- 2021: Waratahs (interim head coach)
- 2022–2023: Australia A
- 2023: Barbarians
- 2024–2025: Harlequins (defence coach)
- 2025–: Harlequins (head coach)

Jason Gilmore is an Australian professional rugby union football coach. He is currently Head Coach at Prem Rugby side Harlequins and was previously interim head coach of the Waratahs in the Super Rugby competition.

Gilmore took over as interim head coach of the Waratahs, alongside Chris Whitaker, in March 2021 following the dismissal of head coach Rob Penney. He had previously been head coach of the Australia U20 side, coaching the team between 2017 and 2020, first as an assistant coach, and then as head coach. He had joined the Waratahs in June 2020 ahead of the 2020 Super Rugby AU season as an assistant coach specialising in defence.

== Coaching career ==
=== Harlequins: 2024–Present ===
In summer 2024, Gilmore replaced former Ireland hooker Jerry Flannery as defence coach at English Premiership side Harlequins. In October 2024, after a first win against rivals Saracens since 2020, Gilmore was heavily praised for turning the clubs defence into a strength having previously been a weakness in the years preceding his arrival.

In September 2025, following the departure of head coach Danny Wilson, Gilmore was named as his successor, initially in the role of senior coach prior to 2025–26 season. In March 2026, despite a poor campaign to that point, he was promoted to the permanent head coach role. The club finished 9th at the end of the season, their lowest finish since the 2017–18 campaign.
