= Chris Whitaker =

Australian rugby union coach and player

- Born: 19 October 1974 (age 52) Sydney, New South Wales, Australia
- Height: 179 cm (5 ft 10 in)
- Weight: 84 kg (13 st 3 lb)
- School: Sydney Boys High School

Rugby union career
- Position: scrum-half
Amateur team(s)
Years	Team	Apps	(Points)
1996–2005	Randwick		
Senior career
Years	Team	Apps	(Points)
2006–2009	Leinster	59	(25)
Super Rugby
Years	Team	Apps	(Points)
1997–2006	NSW Waratahs	118	(60)
International career
Years	Team	Apps	(Points)
1998–2005	Australia	31	(10)
Coaching career
- Years: Team
- 2016–2018: Montauban (co-head coach)
- 2018: Sydney Rays
- 2018–2021: Waratahs (assistant)
- 2021-: Waratahs (interim head coach)
- 2025-: Junior Wallabies

Chris Whitaker (born 19 October 1974) is an Australian professional rugby union coach and former international player. As of 2018 he is head coach of the Sydney Rays in Australia's National Rugby Championship, and the interim head coach of Super Rugby side the New South Wales Waratahs,

Whitaker began his professional playing career in 1997 as a scrum-half for the Waratahs, where he remained for ten seasons. He also played for Australia, but his Test career was constrained for many years by the incumbent scrum-half and captain, George Gregan. As such, he got minimal international game time but was in the match-day squad for many a year. He captained the Wallabies in a World Cup match against Namibia in Adelaide in 2003. In 2006 Whitaker moved to Ireland where he played four seasons for Leinster before hanging up the boots and taking up coaching.

== Early life and career ==
Whitaker was born in Sydney and started playing rugby at Sydney Boys High School, where he graduated in 1992. He played his club rugby at Randwick.

== Rugby career ==
Whitaker joined Super Rugby side the NSW Waratahs in 1997, and gained his first Australian cap the next year. He played a total of 31 games for Australia and scored 10 points. Whitaker left the Waratahs in 2006, and joined Leinster Rugby in Ireland. He won the Celtic League in 2008 with Leinster before winning the Heineken Cup as vice-captain with the side in May, 2009. The final was, in fact, his last professional game before retirement.

== Coaching ==
Whitaker began his coaching career as an assistant with Leinster before moving to France with his wife and three daughters in 2012 to become the defence coach under Michael Cheika for Stade Français, where he remained for two seasons.

He joined Pro D2 club RC Narbonne as assistant coach under Justin Harrison in 2013. Whitaker was signed to coach Montauban in 2016. After a two-year stint there he left the co-head coach role at Montauban and returned to Australia.

Whitaker took on the backs coaching role under Daryl Gibson at the Waratahs ahead of the 2019 Super Rugby season. He was also appointed head coach of the Sydney Rays for the 2018 NRC season.

Whitaker was appointed as NSW Waratahs interim head coach alongside Jason Gilmore on 28 March 2021 after the sacking of head coach Rob Penney.

== Personal life ==
Whitaker is the uncle of Australian rugby union player Amelia Whitaker.

Preceded by George Gregan	Australian national rugby union captain 2003	Succeeded by Nathan Sharpe
