= Cameron Orr =

Australian rugby union player

- Born: Cameron Orr; 2 April 1995 (age 31) Sydney, Australia
- Height: 1.88 m (6 ft 2 in)
- Weight: 122 kg (19 st 3 lb)
- School: Trinity Grammar School

Rugby union career
- Position: Prop
Senior career
Years	Team	Apps	(Points)
2015	Greater Sydney Rams	6	(0)
2016–2018	Gloucester	22	(10)
2018–2019	Western Force	16	(10)
2020–2023	Melbourne Rebels	38	(5)
2023	Wellington	12	(0)
2024–2025	Seattle Seawolves	33	(25)
- Correct as of 28 August 2025
International career
Years	Team	Apps	(Points)
2014–2015	Australia U20		(5)

Cameron Orr (born 2 April 1995) is a retired Australian rugby union player who most recently played for the Seattle Seawolves in Major League Rugby. His usual position is prop.

Orr was originally part of the Waratahs' Generation Blue Academy and he played for the Greater Sydney Rams in the National Rugby Championship. In July 2016, Orr signed for English club Gloucester Rugby to play in the Aviva Premiership from the 2016–17 season.

In February 2018, Orr returned home to Australia to play for Western Force as part of the World Series Rugby invitational matches and the upcoming 2018 National Rugby Championship season.

Orr represented Australia U20s in both the 2014 and 2015 IRB World Junior Championships, held in New Zealand and Italy respectively.

== Super Rugby statistics ==
As of 3 June 2023

Season	Team	Games	Starts	Sub	Mins	Tries	Cons	Pens	Drops	Points	Yel	Red
2020	Rebels	5	0	5	91	0	0	0	0	0	0	0
2020 AU	Rebels	9	7	2	502	0	0	0	0	0	0	0
2021 AU	Rebels	2	1	1	114	0	0	0	0	0	0	0
2021 TT	Rebels	5	5	0	282	0	0	0	0	0	0	0
2022	Rebels	14	7	7	553	1	0	0	0	5	0	0
2023	Rebels	3	0	3	86	0	0	0	0	0	0	0
Total		38	20	18	1,613	1	0	0	0	5	0	0

== Honours ==
Seattle Sea Wolves

- All Major League Ruby first team (2024)
- All Major League Ruby Second team (2025)
