= Ed Craig =

Australian rugby union player

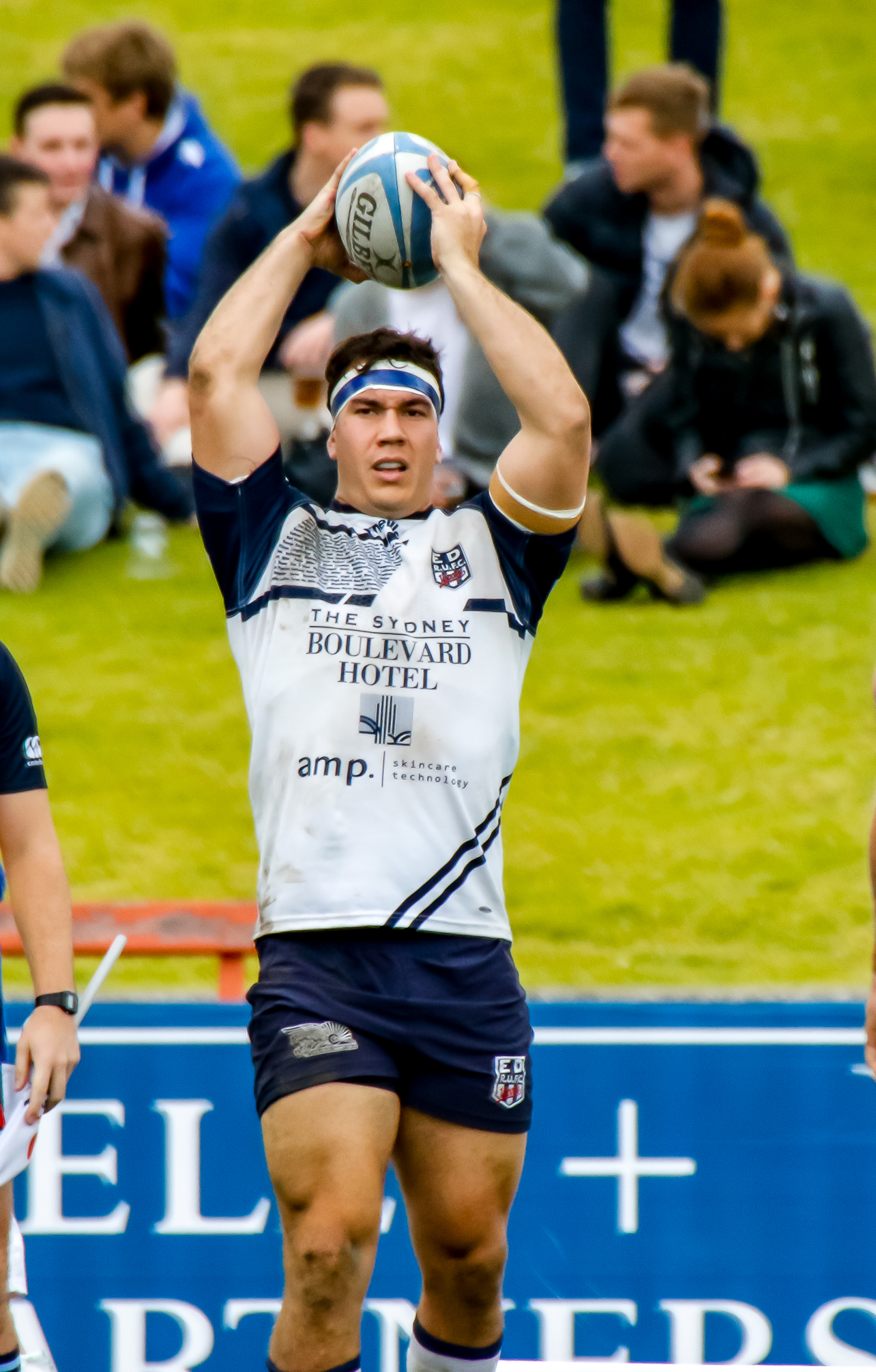
- Born: Edward James Craig; 20 July 1996 (age 30) Sydney, Australia
- Height: 186 cm (6 ft 1 in)
- Weight: 108 kg (238 lb; 17 st 0 lb)

Rugby union career
- Position: Hooker
Amateur team(s)
Years	Team	Apps	(Points)
2016–	Eastwood		
Senior career
Years	Team	Apps	(Points)
2017	Greater Sydney Rams	2	(0)
2019	Sydney	7	(10)
- Correct as of 23 November 2020
Super Rugby
Years	Team	Apps	(Points)
2020	Reds	2	(5)
2021	Rebels	2	(0)
2022	Waratahs	1	(0)
- Correct as of 1 May 2022

Ed Craig (born 20 July 1996) is a teacher at SHORE school in North Sydney where he teaches PDHPE and Christian studies. Previously, Craig was a PDHPE teacher at Barker College in Sydney. He has played rugby union for the NSW Waratahs the Melbourne Rebels and the Queensland Reds. He played for Australian Schoolboys and Australian Under 20s and for Sydney in the National Rugby Championship (NRC). Craig is now playing lower grade games with Norths in the Sydney Shute Shield competition, having retired for his home club Eastwood, and coaching Shore schoolboy first XV forwards and AAGPS representative rugby teams. His position is hooker.

== Early life and junior rugby ==
Ed Craig (Edward James Craig) was born in Sydney (Eastwood) in Australia and played junior club rugby with Hillview Rugby Club (now Central Eastwood), junior rep rugby with Eastwood Rugby Club and school rugby with Epping Boys High School.

He played in the EBHS 1st XV (2012-2014), Combined High Schools (CHS) 1st XV and Combined States in the 2013 Australian Schoolboy Rugby Championships. In 2014, Craig captained the CHS 1st XV and played in the NSW 1st XV which won the Australian Schoolboy Rugby Championships. He played for Australian Schoolboys in their NZ tour 2014 against Fiji and New Zealand. Craig won the Volvo Australian Schools Rugby Scholarship in 2014.

== Rugby career ==
Craig was part of the NSW Waratahs Gen Blue squad and played for NSW in the Australian Super Under 20s Championship. In 2016 he joined the Australian Under 20s side for the World Rugby U20s Championships in Manchester, England, where he played against Scotland and NZ.

Craig plays club rugby for Eastwood in Sydney's Shute Shield competition. He played colts 1st XV (2014-2015), and then 1st and 2nd Grade behind Eastwood’s two contracted NSW Waratah Super Rugby hookers Hugh Roach and Damien Fitzpatrick (2016-2018). Craig played hooker for Eastwood’s 1st Grade side (2019-2022).

He played for the Greater Sydney Rams in the National Rugby Competition (NRC) (2017) and the Sydney NRC (2019). Craig has played 150 games for Eastwood - 130 in first grade - with 41 tries and 205 points.

In February 2020 Craig got his first Super Rugby cap with the Queensland Reds as replacement for injured Reds and Wallabies hooker Brandon Paenga-Amosa. In October 2020 he finished Eastwood's Shute Shield season with a narrow Grand Final loss to Gordon. In November 2020 he signed with the Melbourne Rebels for the 2021 Super Rugby season, and was backup hooker for the NSW Waratahs in 2022.

== Outside rugby ==
Craig has a Bachelor of Education (Health and Physical Education) from the University of Sydney. He teaches Christian Studies and PDHPE and coaches rugby at Sydney's SHORE school.

== Super Rugby statistics ==
As of 12 June 2021

Season	Team	Games	Starts	Sub	Mins	Tries	Cons	Pens	Drops	Points	Yel	Red
2020	Reds	2	0	2	4	1	0	0	0	5	0	0
2021 AU	Rebels	2	0	2	56	0	0	0	0	0	0	0
2021 TT	Rebels	0	0	0	0	0	0	0	0	0	0	0
2022 TT	Waratahs	1	0	1	6	0	0	0	0	0	0	0
Total		5	0	5	66	1	0	0	0	5	0	0
