= Ben Grant (rugby union) =

Australian rugby union player

- Full name: Benjamin William Grant
- Born: 18 May 1998 (age 28) Townsville, Queensland, Australia
- Height: 205 cm (6 ft 9 in)
- Weight: 118 kg (260 lb; 18 st 8 lb)

Rugby union career
- Position: Lock
- Current team: North Harbour, Waratahs
Senior career
Years	Team	Apps	(Points)
2017	Perth Spirit	5	(0)
2018–2020	Force	5	(0)
2021–2023	San Diego Legion	30	(10)
2023–2024	North Harbour	9	(5)
2024	Hurricanes	5	(0)
2025-2026	Waratahs	17	(0)
- Correct as of 30 May 2026

Benjamin William Grant (born 18 May 1998) is an Australian rugby union player who plays for the Waratahs in the Super Rugby competition. His original playing position is lock.

== Early life ==
He moved to Adelaide at the age of one with his mother (Alison Grant) and father (Travis Grant). His brother (William Grant) was born in 2001 followed by his youngest brother (Jay Grant) born in 2003. He later moved back to Queensland living in Gold Coast where he found his passion for rugby union. He attended All Saints Anglican School throughout his upbringing.

== Career ==
He was named in the Force squad for the Global Rapid Rugby competition in 2020.

After spending his early career in Western Australia, Grant made his breakthrough in the San Diego Legion team. Grant moved to New Zealand after three seasons with San Diego, signing with North Harbour in 2023. Subsequently, joining the Hurricanes in 2024, Grant missed much of the 2024 Bunnings NPC injured; having made five appearances for the Hurricanes before returning to North Harbour.

Grant's return to Australia was announced in late 2024, and he was announced in the Waratahs' squad for the 2025 Super Rugby season.
