= Toni Pulu =

US rugby union player

- Full name: Toni Naufahu Pulu
- Born: 28 November 1989 (age 36) Los Angeles, California, United States
- Height: 1.84 m (6 ft 0 in)
- Weight: 93 kg (14 st 9 lb; 205 lb)
- School: Dilworth School, Auckland

Rugby union career
- Position: Wing
- Current team: Seattle Seawolves
Provincial / State sides
Years	Team	Apps	(Points)
2012–2018	Counties Manukau	44	(55)
2019–2020	Canberra Vikings		
2023	Counties Manukau	5	(0)
Super Rugby
Years	Team	Apps	(Points)
2016–2018	Chiefs	31	(70)
2019–2020	Brumbies	14	(10)
2021–2023	Western Force	21	(25)
- Correct as of 4 April 2024
National sevens team
Years	Team		Comps
2009–2011	Niue sevens		3

Toni Pulu (born 28 November 1989) is a rugby union player who currently plays as a wing for the Seattle Seawolves in the MLR competition. He previously played for the Brumbies and Chiefs.

== Early life ==
Born in the United States, Pulu moved to New Zealand at the age of 3 and attended high school at Dilworth School in Auckland. After leaving school, he played local club rugby for the Bombay rugby club, in the Counties Manukau local leagues in the suburbs of Auckland.

== Senior career ==
Pulu began his professional career in New Zealand playing for the Counties Manukau Steelers during the 2012 ITM Cup. He immediately became a regular starter on the wing for the men from Pukekohe and his impressive performances helped them win the ITM Cup Championship and earn promotion to the Premiership for 2013. He scored 2 tries in 9 appearances in the Steelers first season in the Premiership in which they finished up in 4th place on the log before being thrashed 41–10 by Wellington in the semi-finals.

Pulu remained try-less in 8 games through 2014 as Counties finished just outside the play-off places in 5th spot. His try scoring form returned in 2015 with 3 tries in 9 appearances while injury held him back the following year, limiting him to just 4 appearances, in which he scored two 5-pointers in Counties Manukau's run to the Mitre 10 Cup semi-finals.

2023 NPC Season - Back in the hoops for the Counties Manukau Steelers.

== Super Rugby ==
As a result of 3 years of impressive domestic performances for Counties Manukau, Pulu earned a spot in the Chiefs wider training group for the 2015 Super Rugby season. Injuries prevented him from playing during his debut season in Hamilton, but he was retained in the wider training group for 2016. He made his debut for the Chiefs in the 53–10 win over the Western Force at FMG Stadium Waikato on 27 March 2016 and marked the occasion with a try. He went on to play 12 times throughout the season and scored an impressive 5 tries as the Chiefs reached the competition's semi-finals before going down to New Zealand rivals and eventual tournament winners, the Hurricanes. He was subsequently promoted to the full squad for the 2017 Super Rugby season.

== International ==
Pulu has played sevens rugby for his ancestral home, Niue, with the highlight being his appearance at the 2011 Gold Coast Sevens. In 2018, due to being eligible for Australia despite having represented Niue, he moved to the Brumbies.

Pulu is eligible to represent USA rugby due to new eligibility rules.

== Career honours ==
Counties Manukau

- Mitre 10 Cup Championship - 2012

== Super Rugby statistics ==
As of 17 December 2016

Season	Team	Games	Starts	Sub	Mins	Tries	Cons	Pens	Drops	Points	Yel	Red
2016	Chiefs	12	9	3	745	5	0	0	0	25	0	0
Total		12	9	3	745	5	0	0	0	25	0	0
