= Michael Wood (rugby union) =

Australian rugby union player

- Born: 18 February 1999 (age 27) Australia
- Height: 192 cm (6 ft 4 in)
- Weight: 105 kg (231 lb; 16 st 7 lb)
- School: Padua College

Rugby union career
- Position: Lock
Senior career
Years	Team	Apps	(Points)
2018–	Queensland Country	5	(0)
- Correct as of 4 November 2019
Super Rugby
Years	Team	Apps	(Points)
2020	Reds	0	(0)
2021	Waratahs	1	(0)
- Correct as of 24 June 2023
Medal record
Men's rugby union
Representing Australia
Oceania U20 Championship
Winner	2019 Gold Coast
Junior World Cup
Runner-up	2019 Argentina

Michael Wood (born 18 February 1999) is an Australian rugby union player who plays for the NSW Waratahs in Super Rugby AU. His playing position is lock. He was a member of the Queensland Reds squad in 2020, but did not play in a game.
