= Ryan McCauley =

Australian rugby union player

- Born: Elton John; 8 June 1997 (age 29) Sydney, New South Wales, Australia
- Height: 203 cm (6 ft 8 in)
- Weight: 115 kg (18 st 2 lb; 254 lb)
- Notable relative: Michael 'Magic' McCauley

Rugby union career
- Position: Lock
- Current team: Exeter Chiefs
Senior career
Years	Team	Apps	(Points)
2016-2021	Country Eagles	0	(0)
Super Rugby
Years	Team	Apps	(Points)
2017–2020	Waratahs	8	(0)
2021-2023	Force	38	(0)
International career
Years	Team	Apps	(Points)
2015	Schoolboys	1	(0)
2016–2017	Australia U-20	1	(0)

Ryan McCauley is an Australian rugby union player of Irish descent, who plays as a lock for the English Premiership team the Exeter Chiefs. He has also represented Australia in the under 20s team and Schoolboys level.

On 13 August 2021 McCauley signed for Exeter Chiefs, on a short-term deal, from Western Force. On 16 October 2021, McCauley made his first Premiership start for Exeter Chiefs, against Wasps
