= Michael McDonald (rugby union) =

Australian rugby union player

- Born: 24 June 1999 (age 27) County Louth, Ireland
- Height: 178 cm (5 ft 10 in)
- Weight: 85 kg (187 lb; 13 st 5 lb)

Rugby union career
- Position: Scrum-half
Youth career
- –2012: Dundalk
Amateur team(s)
Years	Team	Apps	(Points)
2022-2023	City of Armagh	5	(35)
Senior career
Years	Team	Apps	(Points)
2019	Western Force	1	(0)
2022–2025	Ulster	1	(0)
2023–2024	→ Connacht (loan)	8	(0)
- Correct as of 16 May 2024
Super Rugby
Years	Team	Apps	(Points)
2020	Waratahs	5	(0)
2021–2022	Western Force	6	(11)
2026	Waratahs	2	(0)
- Correct as of 27 May 2026
International career
Years	Team	Apps	(Points)
2019	Australia U20	5	(5)
2022	Emerging Ireland	2	(0)
Medal record
Men's rugby union
Representing Australia
Oceania U20 Championship
Winner	2019 Gold Coast
Junior World Cup
Runner-up	2019 Argentina

Michael McDonald (born 24 June 1999) is an Irish Australian rugby union player who has played for the Waratahs and Western Force in Super Rugby, and Ulster and Connacht in the URC. His playing position is scrum-half.

He signed to the professional team, the New South Wales Waratahs, in the Super Rugby, for the 2020 season. He joined Ulster in July 2022. He was selected for the Emerging Ireland squad for the Toyota Challenge in South Africa in September 2022. The following season he moved to Connacht on a season-long loan. He returned to Ulster ahead of the 2024-25 season, before signing for the Waratahs as short-term injury cover in March 2025. He left Ulster at the end of the 2024-25 season. He was released by the Waratahs at the end of the 2026 season.
