= Joey Walton =

Australian rugby union player (born 2000)

- Born: 27 May 2000 (age 26) Newcastle, New South Wales, Australia
- Height: 185 cm (6 ft 1 in)
- Weight: 97 kg (214 lb; 15 st 4 lb)

Rugby union career
- Position: Centre
Senior career
Years	Team	Apps	(Points)
2019–	NSW Country Eagles	7	(5)
2022	Bay of Plenty		
- Correct as of 6 January 2020
Super Rugby
Years	Team	Apps	(Points)
2020–2026	Waratahs	59	(60)
- Correct as of 30 May 2026
Medal record
Men's rugby union
Representing Australia
Oceania U20 Championship
Winner	2019 Gold Coast

Joey Walton (born 27 May 2000 in Australia) is an Australian rugby union player who plays for the NSW Waratahs in Super Rugby. His playing position is centre. He has signed to the Waratahs squad for the 2020 season.

Walton signed for Bay of Plenty for the 2022 National Provincial Championship.
