= First Nations & Pasifika XV =

- Full name: First Nations & Pasifika XV
- Union: Australian Rugby Union
- Founded: 2025; 1 year ago
- Coach: Toutai Kefu (2025)

First Nations & Pasifika XV is an Australian-based rugby union team which played the British & Irish Lions during their 2025 tour of Australia. The team was made up of players with Indigenous Australian or Pacific Islander origin.

== Background ==
Originally, the British and Irish Lions were scheduled to play nine matches on their tour of Australia. This included the Melbourne Rebels, whom went into administration in January 2024 and were dropped from the tour schedule as a result. The First Nations & Pasifika XV were formed by Rugby Australia to replace the disbanded Melbourne Rebels side, to maintain a 9-match tour for the Lions. The team was to be made up of indigenous Australian and Pacific Islands heritage players, with the match scheduled to take place on 22 July 2025 at the Docklands Stadium in Melbourne. It was aimed that the team would be made up of New Zealand All Blacks internationals that were playing abroad, and ineligible otherwise to play international rugby for the All Blacks.

On 19 May, former Wallabies forward and Tonga head coach Toutai Kefu was named head coach, whilst on 26 May, Glen Ella, Sekope Kepu, Simon Raiwalui and Tana Umaga were named assistants. On 26 June, it was announced that the former Australian international Kurtley Beale would be the captain of the team. The jersey was chosen as a result of a public vote run by Rugby Australia.

In 2026 they are scheduled to play their second fixture against Tonga at the Teufaiva Sport Stadium in Nuku'alofa.

== Squad ==
The full First Nations & Pasifika XV squad for their match against the British & Irish Lions as part of the 2025 tour of Australia was named on 14 July 2025. Some of the players selected had previously played against the Lions on the tour for the AUNZ Invitational XV. It also features the first Fijian internationals to play against the Lions since they played against the Fiji national rugby union team in the 1977 British Lions tour to New Zealand.

On 17 July, Filipo Daugunu and Taniela Tupou were released from the Wallabies squad for the tour match, whilst Ponepati Loganimasi also received a late call-up following the conclusion of the Fijian national team's July internationals.

Coaching team:

- Head coach: Toutai Kefu ( Tonga)
- Assistant coach: Tana Umaga ( Samoa)
- Assistant coach: Simon Raiwalui ( Fiji)
- Assistant coach: Glen Ella ( First Nations)

Player	Position	Date of birth (age)	Caps	Club/province	Heritage
Richie Asiata	Hooker	3 May 1996 (age 30)	0	Queensland Reds	Samoa
Brandon Paenga-Amosa	Hooker	25 December 1995 (age 30)	20	Western Force	Samoa / Māori
George Blake	Prop	11 June 2001 (age 25)	0	Queensland Reds	Cook Islands
Mesake Doge	Prop	1 April 1993 (age 33)	19	Fijian Drua	Fiji
Feao Fotuaika	Prop	23 April 1993 (age 33)	5	ACT Brumbies	Tonga
Lington Ieli	Prop	22 June 2004 (age 22)	0	ACT Brumbies	Fiji
Marley Pearce	Prop	3 August 2003 (age 23)	0	Western Force	Māori / First Nations
Taniela Tupou	Prop	10 May 1996 (age 30)	58	New South Wales Waratahs	Tonga
Lukhan Salakaia-Loto	Lock	19 September 1996 (age 29)	41	Queensland Reds	Samoa
Darcy Swain	Lock	5 July 1997 (age 29)	17	Western Force	Samoa
Mesake Vocevoce	Lock	16 May 2003 (age 23)	9	Fijian Drua	Fiji
Seru Uru	Lock	3 March 1997 (age 29)	0	Queensland Reds	Fiji
Charlie Gamble	Back row	23 April 1996 (age 30)	0	New South Wales Waratahs	Tonga
Rob Leota	Back row	3 March 1997 (age 29)	21	New South Wales Waratahs	Samoa
Pete Samu	Back row	17 December 1991 (age 34)	33	Bordeaux Bègles	Samoa
Tuaina Taii Tualima	Back row	1 June 1997 (age 29)	0	ACT Brumbies	Samoa
Issak Fines-Leleiwasa	Scrum half	2 October 1995 (age 30)	3	Western Force	Fiji
Harrison Goddard	Scrum half	8 April 1998 (age 28)	0	ACT Brumbies	First Nations
Kalani Thomas	Scrum half	18 April 2002 (age 24)	0	Queensland Reds	Māori
Jack Debreczeni	Fly-half	6 June 1993 (age 33)	0	ACT Brumbies	Cook Islands
Filipo Daugunu	Centre	4 March 1995 (age 31)	12	Queensland Reds	Fiji
David Feliuai	Centre	16 May 1997 (age 29)	0	ACT Brumbies	Samoa
Lalakai Foketi	Centre	22 December 1994 (age 31)	9	New South Wales Waratahs	Tonga / Māori
Isaac Henry	Centre	8 March 1999 (age 27)	0	Queensland Reds	First Nations
Jarrah McLeod	Centre	31 May 2004 (age 22)	0	ACT Brumbies	First Nations
Andy Muirhead	Wing	8 July 1993 (age 33)	0	ACT Brumbies	First Nations
Kye Oates	Wing	1 September 1999 (age 26)	0	ACT Brumbies	First Nations
Ponepati Loganimasi	Wing	26 March 1998 (age 28)	4	Fijian Drua	Fiji
Triston Reilly	Wing	14 January 1999 (age 27)	0	New South Wales Waratahs	First Nations
Kurtley Beale	Fullback	6 January 1989 (age 37)	95	Western Force	First Nations

== See also ==
- Australia national rugby union team
- Rugby Australia
