= 2025 British & Irish Lions tour to Australia =

International rugby union tour

- Date: 28 June – 2 August 2025
- Coach: Andy Farrell
- Tour captain: Maro Itoje
- Test series winners: British & Irish Lions (2–1)
- Top point scorer: Finn Russell (44)
- Top try scorer: Duhan van der Merwe (5)
- Top test point scorer: Finn Russell (15)
- Top test try scorer(s): Tom Curry (2); Dan Sheehan (2)
Summary
P	W	D	L
Total
10	8	0	2
Opponent
P	W	D	L
Australia
3	2	0	1

Tour chronology
- ← South Africa 2021 New Zealand 2029 →

The 2025 British & Irish Lions tour to Australia, known for sponsorship reasons as the Qatar Airways Lions Men's Series, was an international rugby union tour which took place in Australia between June and August 2025.

The British & Irish Lions, a team selected from players eligible to represent England, Ireland, Scotland and Wales, played a three-match test series against Australia, as well as matches against Australia's four Super Rugby franchise teams, one against an invitational team made up of players from Australia and New Zealand, and a match against a team made up of players with First Nations and Pasifika origin. Ireland coach Andy Farrell was appointed as the Lions' head coach for the tour in January 2024.

After losing to Argentina in a pre-tour match, the Lions won all their matches in Australia, except the third test. They won the test series 2–1. Following the tour, The Independent reported that it was the most profitable tour in history by a significant margin.

== Schedule ==
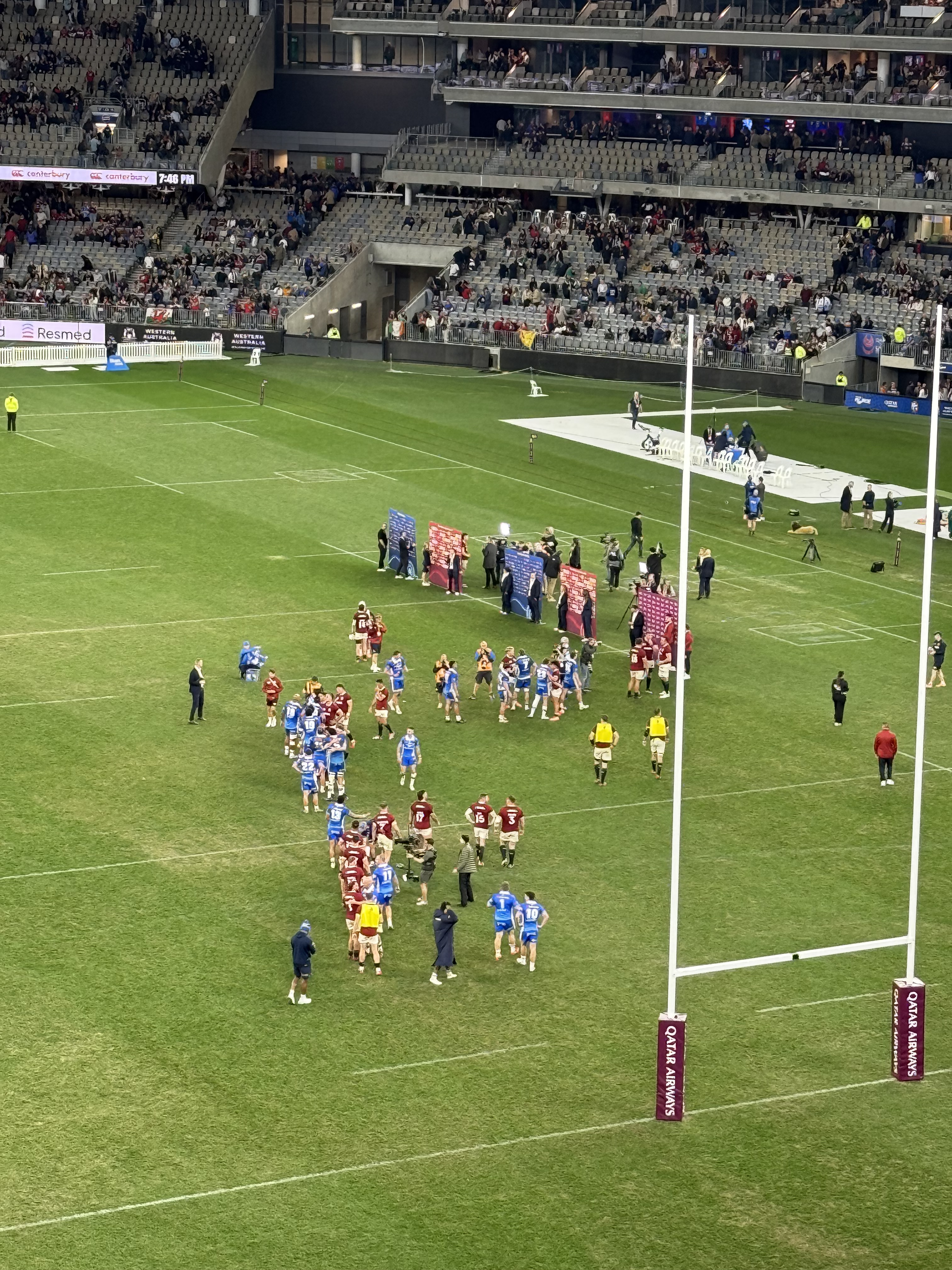
Western Force vs British & Irish Lions at Perth Stadium, 28 June 2025.

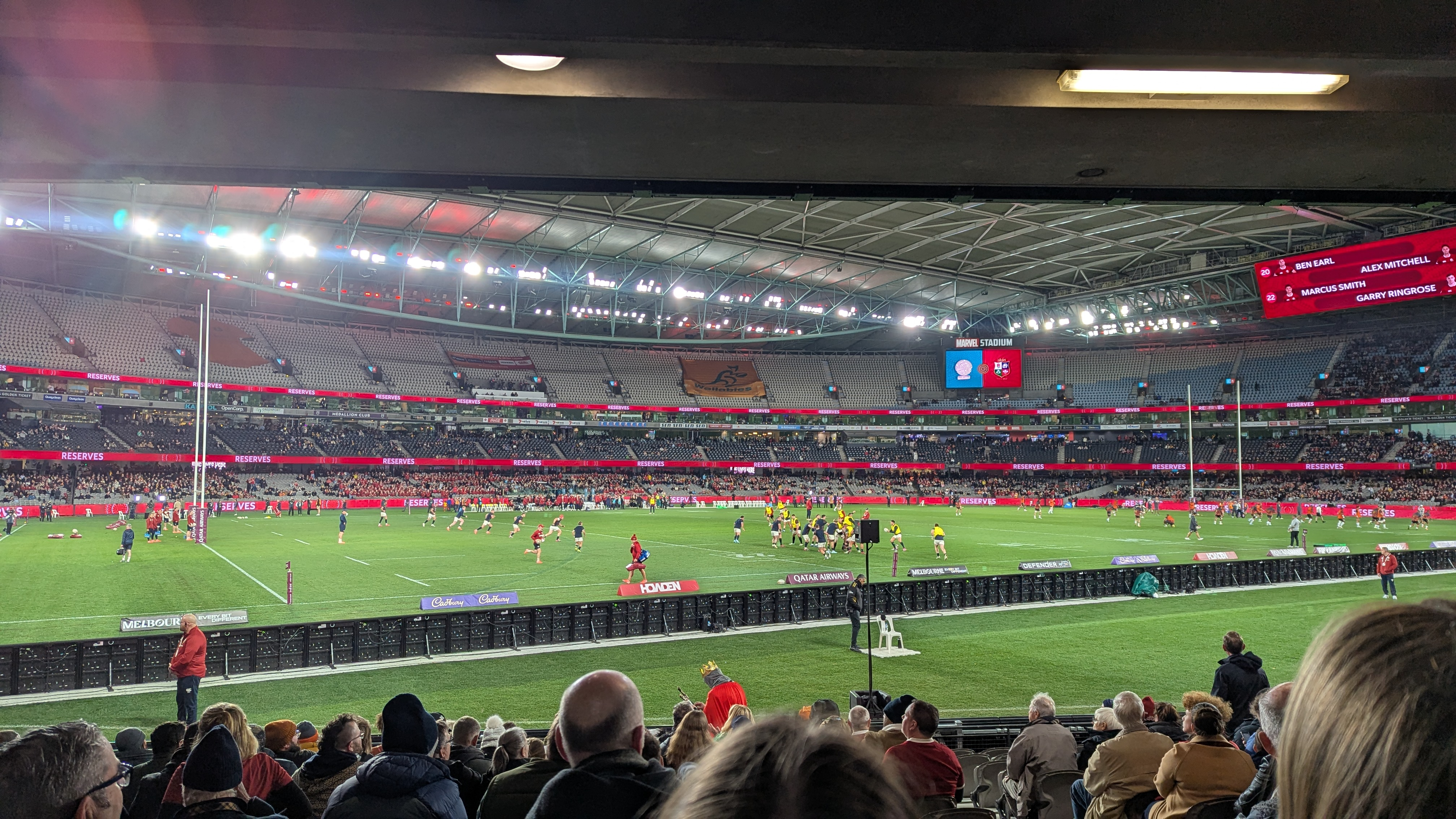
First Nations & Pasifika XV vs British & Irish Lions at Marvel Stadium, 22 July 2025.

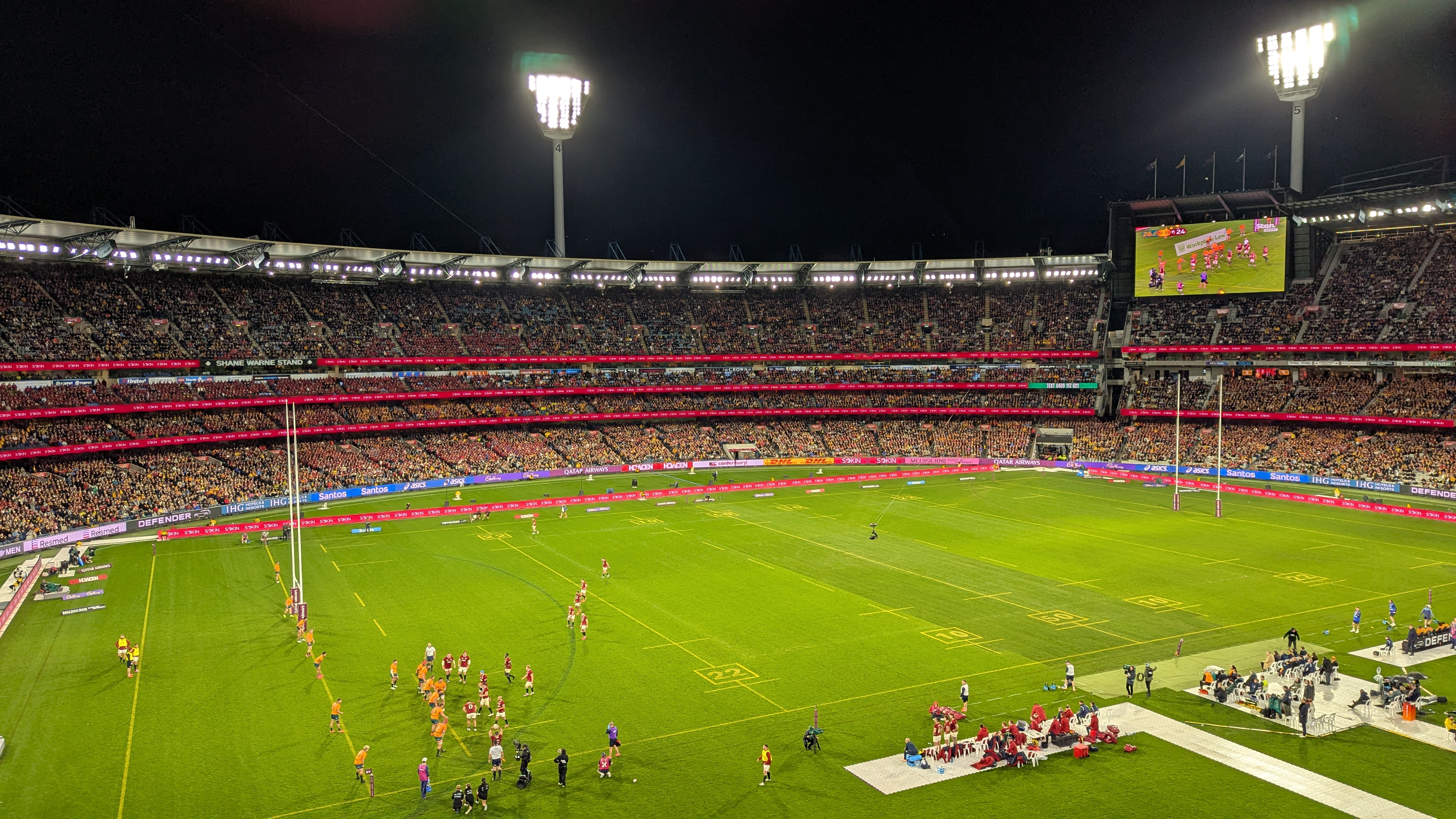
Wallabies vs British & Irish Lions at the MCG, 26 July 2025.

The fixtures for the tour were announced on 19 July 2023. The tour culminated with a three-match test series between the Lions and the Australia, and also featured matches against Australia's four Super Rugby franchises, the Western Force, Queensland Reds, New South Wales Waratahs and ACT Brumbies. They were scheduled to face the Melbourne Rebels in the week between the first and second tests, but the Rebels were disbanded at the end of the 2024 Super Rugby Pacific season after going into administration earlier in the year. A match against a team of players with indigenous Australian and Pacific Island heritage was proposed in its place in November 2024 and confirmed in March 2025. The week before the first test, the Lions played a match in Adelaide against an invitational team of players from Australia and New Zealand. A warm-up match against Argentina was played at the Aviva Stadium in Dublin on 20 June 2025. It was the Lions' first ever match in Ireland.

Date	Home team	Score	Away team	Venue	Details
20 June (Friday)	British & Irish Lions	24–28	Argentina	Aviva Stadium, Dublin, Ireland	(Argentina) Match details
28 June (Saturday)	Western Force	7–54	British & Irish Lions	Perth Stadium, Perth, WA	Match details
2 July (Wednesday)	Queensland Reds	12–52	British & Irish Lions	Lang Park, Brisbane, QLD	Match details
5 July (Saturday)	New South Wales Waratahs	10–21	British & Irish Lions	Sydney Football Stadium, Sydney, NSW	Match details
9 July (Wednesday)	ACT Brumbies	24–36	British & Irish Lions	Canberra Stadium, Canberra, ACT	Match details
12 July (Saturday)	AUNZ Invitational XV	0–48	British & Irish Lions	Adelaide Oval, Adelaide, SA	Match details
19 July (Saturday)	Australia	19–27	British & Irish Lions	Lang Park, Brisbane, QLD	Match details
22 July (Tuesday)	First Nations & Pasifika XV	19–24	British & Irish Lions	Docklands Stadium, Melbourne, VIC	Match details
26 July (Saturday)	Australia	26–29	British & Irish Lions	Melbourne Cricket Ground, Melbourne, VIC	Match details
2 August (Saturday)	Australia	22–12	British & Irish Lions	Stadium Australia, Sydney, NSW	Match details

== Venues ==
Sydney		Melbourne	
Sydney Football Stadium	Stadium Australia	Melbourne Cricket Ground	Docklands Stadium
Capacity: 42,500	Capacity: 83,500	Capacity: 100,024	Capacity: 56,347
Brisbane	2025 British & Irish Lions tour to Australia is located in Australia		Adelaide
Lang Park	2025 British & Irish Lions tour to Australia is located in Australia		Adelaide Oval
Capacity: 52,500	2025 British & Irish Lions tour to Australia is located in Australia		Capacity: 53,500
Perth		Canberra	
Perth Stadium		Canberra Stadium	
Capacity: 60,000		Capacity: 25,000	

== Squads ==
=== British & Irish Lions ===
On 8 May 2025, Lions chairman and tour manager Ieuan Evans announced a 38-player squad at The O2 Arena in London. In a first for the Lions, the squad was announced in front of 2,000 fans.

The initial squad was made up of 15 players from Ireland, 13 from England, 8 from Scotland and 2 from Wales. Maro Itoje was named as the 47th Lions captain.

Notes: Ages listed are as of the first tour match on 20 June against Argentina. Bold denotes that the player was selected for a previous Lions squad. Italic denotes a player that withdrew from the squad following selection.

Player	Position	Date of birth (age)	National team	Club/province	National caps (Lions caps)	Notes
Ewan Ashman	Hooker	3 April 2000 (aged 25)	Scotland	(Scotland) Edinburgh	22	Called up as additional cover
**Luke Cowan-Dickie**	Hooker	20 June 1993 (aged 32)	England	(England) Sale Sharks	49 (3)	
**Jamie George**	Hooker	20 October 1990 (aged 34)	England	(England) Saracens	102 (3)	Called up as injury cover
**Rónan Kelleher**	Hooker	24 January 1998 (aged 27)	Ireland	(Ireland) Leinster	38	
Dan Sheehan	Hooker	17 September 1998 (aged 26)	Ireland	(Ireland) Leinster	32	
Finlay Bealham	Prop	9 October 1991 (aged 33)	Ireland	(Ireland) Connacht	51	Replaced Zander Fagerson
Tom Clarkson	Prop	22 February 2000 (aged 25)	Ireland	(Ireland) Leinster	8	Called up as additional cover
**Zander Fagerson**	Prop	19 January 1996 (aged 29)	Scotland	(Scotland) Glasgow Warriors	75	Withdrew due to injury sustained before tour
**Tadhg Furlong**	Prop	14 November 1992 (aged 32)	Ireland	(Ireland) Leinster	79 (6)	
Ellis Genge	Prop	16 February 1995 (aged 30)	England	(England) Bristol Bears	71	
**Andrew Porter**	Prop	16 January 1996 (aged 29)	Ireland	(Ireland) Leinster	75	
Pierre Schoeman	Prop	7 May 1994 (aged 31)	Scotland	(Scotland) Edinburgh	42	
Will Stuart	Prop	12 July 1996 (aged 28)	England	(England) Bath	50	
**Rory Sutherland**	Prop	24 August 1992 (aged 32)	Scotland	(Scotland) Glasgow Warriors	41 (2)	Called up as additional cover
**Tadhg Beirne**	Second row	8 January 1992 (aged 33)	Ireland	(Ireland) Munster	61 (2)	
Gregor Brown	Second row	1 July 2001 (age 25)	Scotland	(Scotland) Glasgow Warriors	9	Called up as additional cover
Ollie Chessum	Second row	6 September 2000 (aged 24)	England	(England) Leicester Tigers	28	
Scott Cummings	Second row	3 December 1996 (aged 28)	Scotland	(Scotland) Glasgow Warriors	42	
**Maro Itoje** (c)	Second row	28 October 1994 (aged 30)	England	(England) Saracens	93 (6)	
Joe McCarthy	Second row	26 March 2001 (aged 24)	Ireland	(Ireland) Leinster	19	
James Ryan	Second row	24 July 1996 (aged 28)	Ireland	(Ireland) Leinster	72	
**Jack Conan**	Back row	29 July 1992 (aged 32)	Ireland	(Ireland) Leinster	51 (3)	
**Tom Curry**	Back row	15 June 1998 (aged 27)	England	(England) Sale Sharks	61 (3)	
Ben Earl	Back row	7 January 1998 (aged 27)	England	(England) Saracens	42	
Jac Morgan	Back row	21 January 2000 (aged 25)	Wales	(Wales) Ospreys	23	
Henry Pollock	Back row	14 January 2005 (aged 20)	England	(England) Northampton Saints	1	
Josh van der Flier	Back row	25 April 1993 (aged 32)	Ireland	(Ireland) Leinster	73	
Jamison Gibson-Park	Scrum-half	23 February 1992 (aged 33)	Ireland	(Ireland) Leinster	43	
Alex Mitchell	Scrum-half	25 May 1997 (aged 28)	England	(England) Northampton Saints	23	
Ben White	Scrum-half	27 May 1998 (aged 27)	Scotland	(France) Toulon	25	Replaced Tomos Williams
Tomos Williams	Scrum-half	1 January 1995 (aged 30)	Wales	(England) Gloucester	65	Replaced due to injury sustained in match against Western Force
**Owen Farrell**	Fly-half	24 September 1991 (aged 33)	England	(England) Saracens	112 (6)	Replaced Elliot Daly
**Finn Russell**	Fly-half	23 September 1992 (aged 32)	Scotland	(England) Bath	87 (1)	
Fin Smith	Fly-half	11 May 2002 (aged 23)	England	(England) Northampton Saints	11	
**Marcus Smith**	Fly-half	14 February 1999 (aged 26)	England	(England) Harlequins	44	
**Bundee Aki**	Centre	7 April 1990 (aged 35)	Ireland	(Ireland) Connacht	65 (1)	
Huw Jones	Centre	17 December 1993 (aged 31)	Scotland	(Scotland) Glasgow Warriors	58	
Garry Ringrose	Centre	26 January 1995 (aged 30)	Ireland	(Ireland) Leinster	67	
Sione Tuipulotu	Centre	12 February 1997 (aged 28)	Scotland	(Scotland) Glasgow Warriors	30	
Tommy Freeman	Wing	5 March 2001 (aged 24)	England	(England) Northampton Saints	21	
Darcy Graham	Wing	21 June 1997 (aged 27)	Scotland	(Scotland) Edinburgh	43	Called up as additional cover
Mack Hansen	Wing	27 March 1998 (aged 27)	Ireland	(Ireland) Connacht	28	
James Lowe	Wing	8 July 1992 (aged 32)	Ireland	(Ireland) Leinster	40	
**Duhan van der Merwe**	Wing	4 June 1995 (aged 30)	Scotland	(Scotland) Edinburgh	49 (3)	
**Elliot Daly**	Full back	8 October 1992 (aged 32)	England	(England) Saracens	73 (5)	Replaced due to injury sustained in match against Queensland Reds
Hugo Keenan	Full back	18 June 1996 (aged 29)	Ireland	(Ireland) Leinster	46	
Blair Kinghorn	Full back	18 January 1997 (aged 28)	Scotland	(France) Toulouse	60	
Jamie Osborne	Full back	16 November 2001 (aged 24)	Ireland	(Ireland) Leinster	8	Called up as injury cover

==== Management and staff ====
Ireland head coach Andy Farrell was appointed as the Lions' head coach for the tour in January 2024. He succeeded former Wales head coach Warren Gatland, who had led the team on their previous three tours. Farrell was one of Gatland's assistant coaches on the 2013 tour to Australia and 2017 tour to New Zealand.

Farrell announced his five assistant coaches on 26 March 2025. Three of the coaches selected worked under Farrell at Ireland – defence coach Simon Easterby, scrum coach John Fogarty and backs coach Andrew Goodman. Forwards coach John Dalziel was selected from Scotland, whilst attack coach Richard Wigglesworth (who played under Farrell at Saracens) was selected from England. For all five assistant coaches, this was their first Lions tour, although Easterby had toured as a player in 2005. It was also the first tour since 2001 without any representation from Wales among the coaches.

On 17 April, Johnny Sexton was added to the coaching staff. Sexton, who toured with the Lions as a player in 2013 and 2017, has been a coach with Ireland since 2024.

On 23 June, the Lions confirmed the backroom staff of the tour.

Management
Role	Name	
Tour Manager / Chairman	(Wales) Ieuan Evans	
Chief Executive	(England) Ben Calveley	
General Manager	(Australia) David Nucifora	
Coaches
Role	Name	Union / Club
Head Coach	(England) Andy Farrell	Ireland
Forwards Coach	(Scotland) John Dalziel	Scotland
Defence Coach	(Ireland) Simon Easterby	Ireland
Scrum Coach	(Ireland) John Fogarty	Ireland
Backs Coach	(New Zealand) Andrew Goodman	Ireland
Kicking Coach	(Ireland) Johnny Sexton	Ireland
Attack Coach	(England) Richard Wigglesworth	England
Performance staff
Mental Skills Coach	Gary Keegan	Ireland
Head of Analysis	Vinny Hamond	Ireland
Analyst	Carwyn Morgan	England
Analyst	Rhodri Bown	Wales
Analyst	John Buckley	Ireland
Head of Athletic Performance	Aled Walters	Ireland
Strength & Conditioning Coach	Dan Tobin	England
Strength & Conditioning & Sports Scientist	Ben Pollard	England
Nutritionist	Graeme Close	(England) LJMU
Head of Medical	Dr Ciaran Cosgrave	Ireland
Team Doctor	Dr Geoff Davies	Wales
Physiotherapist	Bob Stewart	England
Physiotherapist	John Miles	Wales
Physiotherapist	Keith Fox	Ireland
Massage Therapist	Ann-Marie Birmingham	England
Massage Therapist	Susie Gill	Wales
Kit Man	Mark Beels	Scotland
Operations
Director of Operations	Charlotte Gibbons	England
Head of Communications	Jonny Fordham	(England) Premiership Rugby
Head of Security	Bill Renshaw	England

=== Australia ===
On 11 July 2025, Australia named a 36-player squad ahead of their test series against the British & Irish Lions.

On 22 July 2025, Pete Samu was called up to the squad as training cover, after being blocked from playing in the First Nations & Pasifika XV match.

On 23 July 2025, Josh Flook was called up to the squad as training cover, while Filipo Daugunu recovered from injury sustained during the First Nations & Pasifika XV match.

On 27 July 2025, Aidan Ross was called up to the squad to replace Harry Potter, who was injured during the second test match.

On 1 August 2025, Brandon Paenga-Amosa was called up to the squad to replace Dave Porecki, who was injured leading up to the third test match.

Coaching team:

- Head coach: (New Zealand) Joe Schmidt
- Assistant coach: (England) Geoff Parling
- Assistant coach: (Australia) Laurie Fisher
- Assistant coach: (New Zealand) Mike Cron
- Skills coach: (Ireland) Eoin Toolan

Note: Ages, caps and clubs as of first test match on 19 July 2025.

Player	Position	Date of birth (age)	Caps	Club/province
Matt Faessler	Hooker	21 December 1998 (aged 26)	14	(Australia) Reds
Brandon Paenga-Amosa	Hooker	25 December 1995 (aged 29)	20	(Australia) Force
Billy Pollard	Hooker	9 December 2001 (aged 23)	7	(Australia) Brumbies
Dave Porecki	Hooker	23 October 1992 (aged 32)	20	(Australia) Waratahs
Allan Alaalatoa	Prop	28 January 1994 (aged 31)	81	(Australia) Brumbies
Angus Bell	Prop	4 October 2000 (aged 24)	36	(Australia) Waratahs
Zane Nonggorr	Prop	30 March 2001 (aged 24)	11	(Australia) Reds
Tom Robertson	Prop	28 August 1994 (aged 30)	31	(Australia) Force
Aidan Ross	Prop	25 October 1995 (aged 29)	0	(Australia) Reds
James Slipper	Prop	6 June 1989 (aged 36)	144	(Australia) Brumbies
Taniela Tupou	Prop	10 May 1996 (aged 29)	58	(Australia) Waratahs
Josh Canham	Lock	1 February 2001 (aged 24)	1	(Australia) Reds
Nick Frost	Lock	10 October 1999 (aged 25)	26	(Australia) Brumbies
Will Skelton	Lock	3 May 1992 (aged 33)	32	(France) La Rochelle
Jeremy Williams	Lock	2 December 2000 (aged 24)	12	(Australia) Force
Nick Champion de Crespigny	Back row	27 June 1996 (aged 29)	0	(Australia) Force
Langi Gleeson	Back row	21 July 2001 (aged 23)	15	(Australia) Waratahs
Tom Hooper	Back row	29 January 2001 (aged 24)	11	(Australia) Brumbies
Fraser McReight	Back row	19 February 1999 (aged 26)	26	(Australia) Reds
Carlo Tizzano	Back row	2 February 2000 (aged 25)	6	(Australia) Force
Pete Samu	Back row	17 December 1991 (aged 33)	33	(France) Bordeaux
Rob Valetini	Back row	3 September 1998 (aged 26)	52	(Australia) Brumbies
Harry Wilson (c)	Back row	22 November 1999 (aged 25)	23	(Australia) Reds
Jake Gordon	Scrum-half	6 July 1993 (aged 32)	29	(Australia) Waratahs
Tate McDermott	Scrum-half	18 September 1998 (aged 26)	42	(Australia) Reds
Nic White	Scrum-half	13 June 1990 (aged 35)	72	(Australia) Force
Ben Donaldson	Fly-half	5 April 1999 (aged 26)	17	(Australia) Force
Tom Lynagh	Fly-half	14 April 2003 (aged 22)	3	(Australia) Reds
James O'Connor	Fly-half	5 July 1990 (aged 35)	64	(New Zealand) Crusaders
Filipo Daugunu	Centre	4 March 1995 (aged 30)	12	(Australia) Reds
Josh Flook	Centre	22 September 2001 (aged 23)	4	(Australia) Reds
Len Ikitau	Centre	1 October 1998 (aged 26)	40	(Australia) Brumbies
Hunter Paisami	Centre	10 April 1999 (aged 26)	31	(Australia) Reds
Joseph Sua'ali'i	Centre	1 August 2003 (aged 21)	5	(Australia) Waratahs
Max Jorgensen	Wing	2 September 2004 (aged 20)	8	(Australia) Waratahs
Andrew Kellaway	Wing	12 October 1995 (aged 29)	39	(Australia) Waratahs
Dylan Pietsch	Wing	23 April 1998 (aged 27)	5	(Australia) Waratahs
Harry Potter	Wing	15 December 1997 (aged 27)	3	(Australia) Force
Corey Toole	Wing	7 March 2000 (aged 25)	0	(Australia) Brumbies
Tom Wright	Fullback	21 July 1997 (aged 27)	38	(Australia) Brumbies

== Matches ==
=== British & Irish Lions v Argentina ===
20 June 2025
20:00 IST (UTC+01)

British & Irish Lions	24–28	Argentina
Try: Aki 18' c Penalty try 45'; Beirne 52' c Con: F. Smith (2/2) 19', 53'; Pen: F. Smith (1/1) 9'	Report	Try: Mendy 11' m Albornoz 40' c Cordero 58' c Con: Albornoz (2/3) 40+1', 53'; Pen: Albornoz (3/3) 4', 25', 39'

Aviva Stadium, Dublin
Attendance: 51,700
Referee: James Doleman (New Zealand)

Team details

FB	15	Marcus Smith
RW	14	Tommy Freeman
OC	13	Sione Tuipulotu
IC	12	Bundee Aki	(substituted off) 59'
LW	11	Duhan van der Merwe	(substituted off) 59'
FH	10	Fin Smith
SH	9	Alex Mitchell	(substituted off) 49'
N8	8	Ben Earl
OF	7	Jac Morgan	(substituted off) 49'
BF	6	Tom Curry
RL	5	Tadhg Beirne
LL	4	Maro Itoje (c)	(substituted off) 49'
TP	3	Finlay Bealham	(substituted off) 59'	(substituted on) 80'
HK	2	Luke Cowan-Dickie	(substituted off) 49'
LP	1	Ellis Genge	(substituted off) 59'
Substitutions:
HK	16	Rónan Kelleher	(substituted on) 49'
PR	17	Pierre Schoeman	(substituted on) 59'
PR	18	Tadhg Furlong	(substituted on) 59'	(substituted off) 80'
LK	19	Scott Cummings	(substituted on) 71'
FL	20	Henry Pollock	(substituted on) 49'
SH	21	Tomos Williams	(substituted on) 49'
FB	22	Elliot Daly	(substituted on) 59'
WG	23	Mack Hansen	(substituted on) 59'
Coach:
Andy Farrell

FB	15	Santiago Carreras
RW	14	Rodrigo Isgró
OC	13	Lucio Cinti		(substituted off) 55'	(substituted on) 60'
IC	12	Justo Piccardo
LW	11	Ignacio Mendy		(substituted off) 44'
FH	10	Tomás Albornoz
SH	9	Gonzalo García		(substituted off) 70'
N8	8	Joaquín Oviedo		(substituted off) 47'	(substituted on) 56'	(substituted off) 65'
OF	7	Juan Martín González
BF	6	Pablo Matera
RL	5	Pedro Rubiolo
LL	4	Franco Molina		(substituted off) 59'
TP	3	Joel Sclavi		(substituted off) 47'
HK	2	Julián Montoya (c)		(substituted off) 80'
LP	1	Mayco Vivas	(yellow card) 45'			(substituted off) 66'
Substitutions:
HK	16	Bautista Bernasconi		(substituted on) 80'
PR	17	Boris Wenger		(substituted on) 47'	(substituted off) 56'	(substituted on) 66'
PR	18	Francisco Coria Marchetti		(substituted on) 47'
FL	19	Santiago Grondona		(substituted on) 59'
FL	20	Joaquín Moro		(substituted on) 60'
SH	21	Simón Benítez Cruz		(substituted on) 70'
CE	22	Matías Moroni		(substituted on) 55'	(substituted off) 60'
WG	23	Santiago Cordero		(substituted on) 44'
Coach:
Felipe Contepomi

Player of the Match:
Tomás Albornoz (Argentina)

Assistant referees:
Nika Amashukeli (Georgia)
Andrea Piardi (Italy)
Television match official:
Eric Gauzins (France)
Foul play review officer:
Matteo Liperini (Italy)

Notes:

- Finlay Bealham, Scott Cummings, Ben Earl, Tommy Freeman, Ellis Genge, Mack Hansen, Rónan Kelleher, Alex Mitchell, Jac Morgan, Henry Pollock, Pierre Schoeman, Fin Smith, Sione Tuipulotu and Tomos Williams all made their British & Irish Lions debuts.
- This was Argentina's first win over the British & Irish Lions.
- Argentina won the 1888 Cup.

=== Western Force v British & Irish Lions ===
28 June 2025
18:00 AWST (UTC+8)

Western Force	7–54	British & Irish Lions
Try: White 4' c Con: Donaldson (1/1) 5'	Report	Try: Sheehan 1' c Williams (2) 16' c, 46' m Daly (2) 35' c, 70' c Ringrose 51' c McCarthy 54' c Mitchell 80' c Con: Russell (5/6) 2', 16', 36', 52', 54'; M. Smith (2/2) 71', 80+1'

Perth Stadium, Perth
Attendance: 46,656
Referee: Ben O'Keeffe (New Zealand)

Team details

FB	15	Ben Donaldson
RW	14	Mac Grealy
OC	13	Matt Proctor
IC	12	Hamish Stewart
LW	11	Dylan Pietsch	(substituted off) 61'
FH	10	Alex Harford	(substituted off) 52'
SH	9	Nic White (c)	(substituted off) 58'
N8	8	Vaiolini Ekuasi			(substituted off) 52'
OF	7	Nick Champion de Crespigny
BF	6	Will Harris	(substituted off) 9'	(substituted on) 23'
RL	5	Darcy Swain
LL	4	Sam Carter	(substituted off) 49'
TP	3	Ollie Hoskins	(substituted off) 64'
HK	2	Brandon Paenga-Amosa	(substituted off) 55'
LP	1	Tom Robertson	(substituted off) 56'
Substitutions:
HK	16	Tom Horton	(substituted on) 55'
PR	17	Marley Pearce	(substituted on) 56'
PR	18	Tiaan Tauakipulu	(substituted on) 64'
LK	19	Lopeti Faifua	(substituted on) 49'
FL	20	Reed Prinsep	(substituted on) 9'	(substituted off) 23'	(substituted on) 52'
SH	21	Henry Robertson	(substituted on) 58'
FH	22	Max Burey	(substituted on) 52'
CE	23	Bayley Kuenzle	(substituted on) 61'
Coach:
Simon Cron

FB	15	Elliot Daly
RW	14	Mack Hansen
OC	13	Garry Ringrose		(substituted off) 55'
IC	12	Sione Tuipulotu
LW	11	James Lowe
FH	10	Finn Russell		(substituted off) 61'
SH	9	Tomos Williams		(substituted off) 47'
N8	8	Henry Pollock	(yellow card) 40'
OF	7	Josh van der Flier
BF	6	Tadhg Beirne		(substituted off) 48'
RL	5	Joe McCarthy
LL	4	Scott Cummings		(substituted off) 48'
TP	3	Tadhg Furlong		(substituted off) 48'
HK	2	Dan Sheehan (c)		(substituted off) 65'
LP	1	Pierre Schoeman		(substituted off) 48'
Substitutions:
HK	16	Rónan Kelleher		(substituted on) 65'
PR	17	Andrew Porter		(substituted on) 48'
PR	18	Will Stuart		(substituted on) 48'
LK	19	Ollie Chessum		(substituted on) 48'
N8	20	Jack Conan		(substituted on) 48'
SH	21	Alex Mitchell		(substituted on) 47'
CE	22	Huw Jones		(substituted on) 55'
FH	23	Marcus Smith		(substituted on) 61'
Coach:
Andy Farrell

Player of the Match:
Joe McCarthy (British & Irish Lions)

Assistant referees:
Paul Williams (New Zealand)
James Doleman (New Zealand)
Television match official:
Marius van der Westhuizen (South Africa)
Foul play review officer:
Glenn Newman (New Zealand)

Notes:

- Dan Sheehan, Joe McCarthy, Josh van der Flier, James Lowe, Garry Ringrose, Andrew Porter, Will Stuart, Ollie Chessum and Huw Jones all made their British & Irish Lions debuts.

=== Queensland Reds v British & Irish Lions ===
2 July 2025
20:00 AEST (UTC+10)

Queensland Reds	12–52	British & Irish Lions
Try: Toomaga-Allen 8' c Flook 25' m Con: McLaughlin-Phillips (1/2) 9'	Report	Try: Freeman (2) 19' c, 60' c Porter 28' c van der Merwe 35' c Itoje 44' c Morgan 55' c Jones 65' m Ringrose 80+4' m Con: Russell (4/4) 20', 29', 36', 45'; F. Smith (2/4) 56', 61'

Lang Park, Brisbane
Attendance: 46,435
Referee: James Doleman (New Zealand)

Team details

FB	15	Jock Campbell (c)
RW	14	Lachie Anderson
OC	13	Josh Flook	(substituted off) 52'
IC	12	Hunter Paisami
LW	11	Tim Ryan
FH	10	Harry McLaughlin-Phillips
SH	9	Kalani Thomas	(substituted off) 62'
N8	8	Joe Brial	(substituted off) 62'
OF	7	John Bryant
BF	6	Seru Uru
RL	5	Lukhan Salakaia-Loto	(substituted off) 52'
LL	4	Josh Canham	(substituted off) 62'
TP	3	Jeffery Toomaga-Allen	(substituted off) 57'
HK	2	Matt Faessler	(substituted off) 52'
LP	1	Aidan Ross	(substituted off) 57'
Substitutions:
HK	16	Josh Nasser	(substituted on) 52'
PR	17	George Blake	(substituted on) 57'
PR	18	Sef Fa'agase	(substituted on) 57'
LK	19	Ryan Smith	(substituted on) 62'
LK	20	Angus Blyth	(substituted on) 52'
LK	21	Connor Vest	(substituted on) 62'
SH	22	Louis Werchon	(substituted on) 62'
CE	23	Isaac Henry	(substituted on) 52'
Coach:
Les Kiss

FB	15	Elliot Daly	(substituted off) 67'
RW	14	Tommy Freeman
OC	13	Huw Jones
IC	12	Bundee Aki	(substituted off) 67'
LW	11	Duhan van der Merwe
FH	10	Finn Russell	(substituted off) 50'
SH	9	Jamison Gibson-Park	(substituted off) 50'
N8	8	Jack Conan
OF	7	Jac Morgan
BF	6	Tom Curry
RL	5	Ollie Chessum	(substituted off) 58'
LL	4	Maro Itoje (c)
TP	3	Will Stuart	(substituted off) 50'
HK	2	Rónan Kelleher	(substituted off) 50'
LP	1	Andrew Porter	(substituted off) 50'
Substitutions:
HK	16	Luke Cowan-Dickie	(substituted on) 50'
PR	17	Ellis Genge	(substituted on) 50'
PR	18	Finlay Bealham	(substituted on) 50'
LK	19	James Ryan	(substituted on) 58'
FL	20	Ben Earl	(substituted on) 67'
SH	21	Alex Mitchell	(substituted on) 50'
FH	22	Fin Smith	(substituted on) 50'
CE	23	Garry Ringrose	(substituted on) 67'
Coach:
Andy Farrell

Player of the Match:
Jac Morgan (British & Irish Lions)

Assistant referees:
Paul Williams (New Zealand)
Ben O'Keeffe (New Zealand)
Television match official:
Glenn Newman (New Zealand)
Foul play review officer:
Marius van der Westhuizen (South Africa)

Notes:

- Jamison Gibson-Park and James Ryan both made their British & Irish Lions debuts.

=== New South Wales Waratahs v British & Irish Lions ===
5 July 2025
20:00 AEST (UTC+10)

New South Wales Waratahs	10–21	British & Irish Lions
Try: Lancaster 34' m Dobbins 41' m	Report	Try: Jones (2) 11' c, 32' c Mitchell 54' c Con: F. Smith (3/3) 12', 33', 55'

Sydney Football Stadium, Sydney
Attendance: 40,568
Referee: Paul Williams (New Zealand)

Team details

FB	15	Lawson Creighton
RW	14	Andrew Kellaway
OC	13	Lalakai Foketi	(substituted off) 50'
IC	12	Joey Walton
LW	11	Darby Lancaster
FH	10	Jack Bowen	(substituted off) 55'
SH	9	Teddy Wilson	(substituted off) 70'
N8	8	Hugh Sinclair (c)	(substituted off) 59'
OF	7	Charlie Gamble
BF	6	Rob Leota
RL	5	Miles Amatosero	(substituted off) 51'	(substituted on) 62'
LL	4	Fergus Lee-Warner	(substituted off) 62'
TP	3	Taniela Tupou	(substituted off) 55'
HK	2	Ethan Dobbins	(substituted off) 49'
LP	1	Tom Lambert	(substituted off) 70'
Substitutions:
HK	16	Mahe Vailanu	(substituted on) 49'
PR	17	Jack Barrett	(substituted on) 70'
PR	18	Daniel Botha	(substituted on) 55'
LK	19	Matt Philip	(substituted on) 51'
FL	20	Jamie Adamson	(substituted on) 59'
SH	21	Jack Grant	(substituted on) 70'
FH	22	Tane Edmed	(substituted on) 55'
CE	23	Henry O'Donnell	(substituted on) 55'
Coach:
Dan McKellar

FB	15	Hugo Keenan	(substituted off) 50'
RW	14	Mack Hansen
OC	13	Huw Jones
IC	12	Sione Tuipulotu
LW	11	Blair Kinghorn
FH	10	Fin Smith	(substituted off) 59'
SH	9	Alex Mitchell	(substituted off) 70'
N8	8	Ben Earl
OF	7	Josh van der Flier	(substituted off) 60'
BF	6	Tadhg Beirne (c)
RL	5	James Ryan	(substituted off) 50'
LL	4	Scott Cummings
TP	3	Finlay Bealham	(substituted off) 50'
HK	2	Luke Cowan-Dickie	(substituted off) 50'
LP	1	Pierre Schoeman	(substituted off) 50'
Substitutions:
HK	16	Dan Sheehan	(substituted on) 50'
PR	17	Ellis Genge	(substituted on) 50'
PR	18	Tadhg Furlong	(substituted on) 50'
LK	19	Joe McCarthy	(substituted on) 50'
WG	20	(Scotland) Duhan van der Merwe	(substituted on) 50'
FL	21	Jac Morgan	(substituted on) 60'
SH	22	Ben White	(substituted on) 70'
FH	23	Marcus Smith	(substituted on) 59'
Coach:
Andy Farrell

Player of the Match:
Alex Mitchell (British & Irish Lions)

Assistant referees:
James Doleman (New Zealand)
Angus Mabey (New Zealand)
Television match official:
Richard Kelly (New Zealand)
Foul play review officer:
Marius van der Westhuizen (South Africa)

Notes:

- Hugo Keenan, Blair Kinghorn and Ben White all made their British & Irish Lions debuts.

=== ACT Brumbies v British & Irish Lions ===
9 July 2025
20:00 AEST (UTC+10)

ACT Brumbies	24–36	British & Irish Lions
Try: Tualima 3' m Toole 36' m Creighton 50' c Bowron 74' c Con: R. Lonergan (1/3) 51'; Debreczeni (1/1) 75'	Report	Try: Chessum 14' m Lowe 28' c M. Smith 40' c Ringrose 46' c van der Flier 66' c Con: Russell (4/5) 29', 40+1', 47', 67'; Pen: Russell (1/1) 61'

Canberra Stadium, Canberra
Attendance: 23,116
Referee: Pierre Brousset (France)

Team details

FB	15	Andy Muirhead
RW	14	Ben O'Donnell
OC	13	Ollie Sapsford
IC	12	David Feliuai		(substituted off) 30'
LW	11	Corey Toole
FH	10	Declan Meredith		(substituted off) 63'
SH	9	Ryan Lonergan (c)		(substituted off) 70'
N8	8	Tuaina Taii Tualima		(substituted off) 68'
OF	7	Rory Scott		(substituted off) 50'
BF	6	Tom Hooper	(yellow card) 80'
RL	5	Cadeyrn Neville
LL	4	Lachlan Shaw
TP	3	Rhys van Nek		(substituted off) 55'
HK	2	Lachlan Lonergan		(substituted off) 50'
LP	1	Lington Ieli		(substituted off) 50'
Substitutions:
HK	16	Liam Bowron		(substituted on) 50'
PR	17	Cameron Orr		(substituted on) 50'
PR	18	Feao Fotuaika		(substituted on) 55'
FL	19	Lachlan Hooper		(substituted on) 68'
FL	20	Luke Reimer		(substituted on) 50'
SH	21	Harrison Goddard		(substituted on) 70'
FH	22	Jack Debreczeni		(substituted on) 63'
CE	23	Hudson Creighton		(substituted on) 30'
Coach:
Stephen Larkham

FB	15	Blair Kinghorn	(substituted off) 24'
RW	14	Tommy Freeman
OC	13	Garry Ringrose
IC	12	Bundee Aki
LW	11	James Lowe	(substituted off) 62'
FH	10	Finn Russell
SH	9	Jamison Gibson-Park	(substituted off) 70'
N8	8	Jack Conan
OF	7	Tom Curry	(substituted off) 50'
BF	6	Ollie Chessum
RL	5	Joe McCarthy	(substituted off) 57'
LL	4	Maro Itoje (c)
TP	3	Tadhg Furlong	(substituted off) 50'
HK	2	Dan Sheehan	(substituted off) 60'
LP	1	Ellis Genge	(substituted off) 50'
Substitutions:
HK	16	Rónan Kelleher	(substituted on) 60'
PR	17	Andrew Porter	(substituted on) 50'
PR	18	Will Stuart	(substituted on) 50'
FL	19	Josh van der Flier	(substituted on) 50'
FL	20	Henry Pollock	(substituted on) 57'
SH	21	Alex Mitchell	(substituted on) 70'
FH	22	Marcus Smith	(substituted on) 24'
WG	23	Mack Hansen	(substituted on) 62'
Coach:
Andy Farrell

Player of the Match:
Jamison Gibson-Park (British & Irish Lions)

Assistant referees:
Paul Williams (New Zealand)
Nika Amashukeli (Georgia)
Television match official:
Marius van der Westhuizen (South Africa)
Foul play review officer:
Eric Gauzins (France)

=== Invitational AU & NZ v British & Irish Lions ===
12 July 2025
19:30 ACST (UTC+09:30)

AUNZ Invitational XV	0–48	British & Irish Lions
	Report	Try: van der Merwe (3) 6' m, 20' m, 63' m White 9' c Tuipulotu 43' c Cummings 61' c Kelleher 69' m Pollock 75' c Con: F. Smith (2/4) 10', 43'; M. Smith (2/4) 61', 76'

Adelaide Oval, Adelaide
Attendance: 43,124
Referee: Andrea Piardi (Italy)

Team details

FB	15	Shaun Stevenson
RW	14	AJ Lam		(substituted off) 46'
OC	13	Ngani Laumape
IC	12	David Havili (cc)
LW	11	Marika Koroibete		(substituted off) 44'
FH	10	Tane Edmed
SH	9	Folau Fakatava		(substituted off) 54'
N8	8	Hoskins Sotutu		(substituted off) 65'
OF	7	Pete Samu
BF	6	Shannon Frizell	(yellow card) 69'
RL	5	Lukhan Salakaia-Loto (cc)
LL	4	Angus Blyth		(substituted off) 55'
TP	3	Jeffery Toomaga-Allen		(substituted off) 40'
HK	2	Brandon Paenga-Amosa		(substituted off) 40'
LP	1	Aidan Ross		(substituted off) 50'
Substitutions:
HK	16	Kurt Eklund		(substituted on) 40'
PR	17	Josh Fusitua	(yellow card) 79'	(substituted on) 50'
PR	18	George Dyer		(substituted on) 40'
LK	19	Matt Philip		(substituted on) 55'
FL	20	Joe Brial		(substituted on) 65'
SH	21	Kalani Thomas		(substituted on) 54'
FH	22	Harry McLaughlin-Phillips		(substituted on) 46'
FB	23	Jock Campbell		(substituted on) 46'
Coach:
Les Kiss

FB	15	Hugo Keenan
RW	14	Mack Hansen
OC	13	Huw Jones	(substituted off) 49'
IC	12	Sione Tuipulotu
LW	11	(Scotland) Duhan van der Merwe
FH	10	Fin Smith	(substituted off) 49'
SH	9	Ben White	(substituted off) 74'
N8	8	Ben Earl	(substituted off) 62'
OF	7	Jac Morgan
BF	6	Henry Pollock
RL	5	Tadhg Beirne (c)	(substituted off) 58'
LL	4	James Ryan
TP	3	Will Stuart	(substituted off) 49'
HK	2	Luke Cowan-Dickie	(substituted off) 36'
LP	1	Pierre Schoeman
Substitutions:
HK	16	Rónan Kelleher	(substituted on) 36'
PR	17	Andrew Porter
PR	18	Finlay Bealham	(substituted on) 49'
LK	19	Scott Cummings	(substituted on) 58'
FL	20	Josh van der Flier	(substituted on) 62'
SH	21	Alex Mitchell	(substituted on) 74'
FH	22	Marcus Smith	(substituted on) 49'
FH	23	Owen Farrell	(substituted on) 49'
Coach:
Andy Farrell

Player of the Match:
Ben Earl (British & Irish Lions)

Assistant referees:
Nika Amashukeli (Georgia)
Pierre Brousset (France)
Television match official:
Eric Gauzins (France)
Foul play review officer:
Marius Jonker (South Africa)

Notes:

- Owen Farrell became the fifth player to represent the British & Irish Lions on four or more tours.
- The British & Irish Lions nilled their opposition for the first time since playing the Melbourne Rebels (35–0) on their 2013 tour.

=== Australia v British & Irish Lions (first test) ===
19 July 2025
20:00 AEST (UTC+10)

Australia	19–27	British & Irish Lions
Try: Jorgensen 28' m Tizzano 67' c McDermott 78' c Con: Donaldson (2/2) 68', 78'	Report	Try: Tuipulotu 8' c Curry 35' c Sheehan 41' c Con: Russell (3/3) 9', 36', 42'; Pen: Russell (1/1) 1'; M. Smith (1/1) 73'

Lang Park, Brisbane
Attendance: 52,229
Referee: Ben O'Keeffe (New Zealand)

FB	15	Tom Wright
RW	14	Max Jorgensen
OC	13	Joseph Sua'ali'i
IC	12	Len Ikitau	(substituted off) 68'
LW	11	Harry Potter
FH	10	Tom Lynagh	(substituted off) 60'
SH	9	Jake Gordon	(substituted off) 58'
N8	8	Harry Wilson (c)
OF	7	Fraser McReight
BF	6	Nick Champion de Crespigny	(substituted off) 66'
RL	5	Jeremy Williams	(substituted off) 58'
LL	4	Nick Frost
TP	3	Allan Alaalatoa	(substituted off) 57'
HK	2	Matt Faessler	(substituted off) 49'
LP	1	James Slipper	(substituted off) 49'
Substitutions:
HK	16	Billy Pollard	(substituted on) 49'
PR	17	Angus Bell	(substituted on) 49'
PR	18	Tom Robertson	(substituted on) 49'
LK	19	Tom Hooper	(substituted on) 58'
FL	20	Carlo Tizzano	(substituted on) 66'
SH	21	Tate McDermott	(substituted on) 58'
FH	22	Ben Donaldson	(substituted on) 60'
WG	23	Andrew Kellaway	(substituted on) 68'
Coach:
Joe Schmidt

FB	15	Hugo Keenan
RW	14	Tommy Freeman
OC	13	Huw Jones
IC	12	Sione Tuipulotu	(substituted off) 57'
LW	11	James Lowe
FH	10	Finn Russell	(substituted off) 66'
SH	9	Jamison Gibson-Park	(substituted off) 74'
N8	8	Jack Conan
OF	7	Tom Curry	(substituted off) 57'
BF	6	Tadhg Beirne
RL	5	Joe McCarthy	(substituted off) 43'
LL	4	Maro Itoje (c)
TP	3	Tadhg Furlong	(substituted off) 57'
HK	2	Dan Sheehan	(substituted off) 60'
LP	1	Ellis Genge	(substituted off) 48'
Substitutions:
HK	16	Rónan Kelleher	(substituted on) 60'
PR	17	Andrew Porter	(substituted on) 48'
PR	18	Will Stuart	(substituted on) 57'
LK	19	Ollie Chessum	(substituted on) 43'
FL	20	Ben Earl	(substituted on) 57'
SH	21	Alex Mitchell	(substituted on) 74'
FH	22	Marcus Smith	(substituted on) 66'
CE	23	Bundee Aki	(substituted on) 57'
Coach:
Andy Farrell

Player of the Match:
Tadhg Beirne (British & Irish Lions)

Assistant referees:
Nika Amashukeli (Georgia)
Andrea Piardi (Italy)
Television match official:
Richard Kelly (New Zealand)
Foul play review officer:
Eric Gauzins (France)

Notes:

- Nick Champion de Crespigny (Australia) made his international debut.
- Ollie Chessum, Ben Earl, Tommy Freeman, Ellis Genge, Jamison Gibson-Park, Huw Jones, Hugo Keenan, James Lowe, Rónan Kelleher, Joe McCarthy, Alex Mitchell, Andrew Porter, Dan Sheehan, Marcus Smith, Will Stuart, Sione Tuipulotu made their Lions test debuts.
- Maro Itoje earned his 100th test cap (93 for England, 7 for the British & Irish Lions).

=== First Nations & Pasifika XV v British & Irish Lions ===
22 July 2025
20:00 AEST (UTC+10)

First Nations & Pasifika XV	19–24	British & Irish Lions
Try: Reilly 17' c Uru 22' c Leota 70' m Con: Beale (2/3) 18', 23'	Report	Try: Osborne (2) 7' c, 44' m Graham 10' c van der Merwe 63' m Con: F. Smith (2/4) 8', 11'

Marvel Stadium, Melbourne
Attendance: 30,420
Referee: Nika Amashukeli (Georgia)

Team details

FB	15	Andy Muirhead
RW	14	Filipo Daugunu	(substituted off) 16'
OC	13	Lalakai Foketi
IC	12	David Feliuai	(substituted off) 40'
LW	11	Triston Reilly
FH	10	Kurtley Beale (c)
SH	9	Kalani Thomas	(substituted off) 54'
N8	8	Tuaina Taii Tualima	(substituted off) 66'
OF	7	Charlie Gamble
BF	6	Seru Uru	(substituted off) 51'
RL	5	Lukhan Salakaia-Loto
LL	4	Darcy Swain
TP	3	Taniela Tupou	(substituted off) 45'
HK	2	Brandon Paenga-Amosa	(substituted off) 45'
LP	1	Lington Ieli	(substituted off) 54'
Substitutions:
HK	16	Richie Asiata	(substituted on) 45'
PR	17	Marley Pearce	(substituted on) 54'
PR	18	Mesake Doge	(substituted on) 45'
FL	19	Mesake Vocevoce	(substituted on) 66'
FL	20	Rob Leota	(substituted on) 51'
SH	21	Harrison Goddard	(substituted on) 54'
FH	22	Jack Debreczeni	(substituted on) 10'
CE	23	Jarrah McLeod	(substituted on) 40'
Coach:
Toutai Kefu

FB	15	Blair Kinghorn
RW	14	Darcy Graham	(substituted off) 16'
OC	13	Jamie Osborne
IC	12	Owen Farrell (c)
LW	11	Duhan van der Merwe
FH	10	Fin Smith	(substituted off) 66'	(substituted on) 72'
SH	9	Ben White
N8	8	Henry Pollock
OF	7	Josh van der Flier
BF	6	Jac Morgan	(substituted off) 50'
RL	5	Scott Cummings
LL	4	James Ryan	(substituted off) 53'
TP	3	Finlay Bealham	(substituted off) 50'
HK	2	Jamie George	(substituted off) 73'
LP	1	Pierre Schoeman	(substituted off) 73'
Substitutions:
HK	16	Ewan Ashman	(substituted on) 73'
PR	17	Rory Sutherland	(substituted on) 73'
PR	18	Tom Clarkson	(substituted on) 50'
LK	19	Gregor Brown	(substituted on) 53'
FL	20	Ben Earl	(substituted on) 50'
SH	21	Alex Mitchell
FH	22	Marcus Smith	(substituted on) 66'	(substituted off) 72'
CE	23	Garry Ringrose	(substituted on) 16'
Coach:
Andy Farrell

Player of the Match:
Charlie Gamble (First Nations & Pasifika XV)

Assistant referees:
Ben O'Keeffe (New Zealand)
Andrea Piardi (Italy)
Television match official:
Marius Jonker (South Africa)
Foul play review officer:
Richard Kelly (New Zealand)

Notes:

- Ewan Ashman, Gregor Brown, Tom Clarkson, Darcy Graham and Jamie Osborne all made their British & Irish Lions debuts.

=== Australia v British & Irish Lions (second test) ===
26 July 2025
20:00 AEST (UTC+10)

Australia	26–29	British & Irish Lions
Try: Slipper 15' m Gordon 27' c Wright 30' m Con: Lynagh (1/3) 28'; Pen: Lynagh (3/3) 4', 10', 53'	Report	Try: Sheehan 15' m Curry 34' m Jones 37' c Beirne 59' c Keenan 79' m Con: Russell (2/5) 38', 60'

Melbourne Cricket Ground, Melbourne
Attendance: 90,307
Referee: Andrea Piardi (Italy)

FB	15	Tom Wright
RW	14	Max Jorgensen
OC	13	Joseph Sua'ali'i
IC	12	Len Ikitau
LW	11	Harry Potter	(substituted off) 19'
FH	10	Tom Lynagh
SH	9	Jake Gordon
N8	8	Harry Wilson (c)
OF	7	Fraser McReight	(substituted off) 60'
BF	6	Rob Valetini	(substituted off) 40'
RL	5	Will Skelton	(substituted off) 47'
LL	4	Nick Frost
TP	3	Allan Alaalatoa	(substituted off) 40'
HK	2	Dave Porecki	(substituted off) 56'
LP	1	James Slipper	(substituted off) 40'
Substitutions:
HK	16	Billy Pollard	(substituted on) 56'
PR	17	Angus Bell	(substituted on) 40'
PR	18	Tom Robertson	(substituted on) 40'
LK	19	Jeremy Williams	(substituted on) 47'
FL	20	Langi Gleeson	(substituted on) 40'
FL	21	Carlo Tizzano	(substituted on) 60'
SH	22	Tate McDermott	(substituted on) 19'
FH	23	Ben Donaldson
Coach:
Joe Schmidt

FB	15	Hugo Keenan
RW	14	Tommy Freeman	(yellow card) 23'
OC	13	Huw Jones		(substituted off) 60'
IC	12	Bundee Aki
LW	11	James Lowe		(substituted off) 60'
FH	10	Finn Russell
SH	9	Jamison Gibson-Park
N8	8	Jack Conan
OF	7	Tom Curry		(substituted off) 54'
BF	6	Tadhg Beirne
RL	5	Ollie Chessum		(substituted off) 54'
LL	4	Maro Itoje (c)
TP	3	Tadhg Furlong		(substituted off) 64'
HK	2	Dan Sheehan		(substituted off) 64'
LP	1	Andrew Porter		(substituted off) 54'
Substitutions:
HK	16	Rónan Kelleher		(substituted on) 64'
PR	17	Ellis Genge		(substituted on) 54'
PR	18	Will Stuart		(substituted on) 64'
LK	19	James Ryan		(substituted on) 54'
FL	20	Jac Morgan		(substituted on) 54'
SH	21	Alex Mitchell
FH	22	Owen Farrell		(substituted on) 60'
FB	23	Blair Kinghorn		(substituted on) 60'
Coach:
Andy Farrell

Player of the Match:
Maro Itoje (British & Irish Lions)

Assistant referees:
Nika Amashukeli (Georgia)
Ben O'Keeffe (New Zealand)
Television match official:
Eric Gauzins (France)
Foul play review officer:
Marius Jonker (South Africa)

Notes:

- Blair Kinghorn, Jac Morgan and James Ryan made their British & Irish Lions test debuts.
- The British & Irish Lions won their first test series since Australia 2013, and won a test series with a game in hand for the first time since South Africa 1997.
- Owen Farrell became the first player in the professional era to win two British & Irish Lions test series.
- The 90,307 match attendance was a record crowd for a British & Irish Lions match, and the MCG's record largest rugby union crowd.

=== Australia v British & Irish Lions (third test) ===
2 August 2025
20:00 AEST (UTC+10)

Australia	22–12	British & Irish Lions
Try: Pietsch 7' m Jorgensen 54' c McDermott 70' c Con: Donaldson (2/2) 55', 72'; Pen: Lynagh (1/1) 33'	Report	Try: Morgan 61' c Stuart 79' m Con: Russell (1/2) 62'

Stadium Australia, Sydney
Attendance: 80,312
Referee: Nika Amashukeli (Georgia)

FB	15	Tom Wright
RW	14	Max Jorgensen	(substituted off) 77'
OC	13	Joseph Sua'ali'i
IC	12	Len Ikitau
LW	11	Dylan Pietsch
FH	10	Tom Lynagh	(substituted off) 33'
SH	9	Nic White	(substituted off) 58'
N8	8	Harry Wilson (c)
OF	7	Fraser McReight
BF	6	Tom Hooper	(substituted off) 77'
RL	5	Will Skelton	(substituted off) 63'
LL	4	Nick Frost
TP	3	Taniela Tupou	(substituted off) 60'
HK	2	Billy Pollard	(substituted off) 72'
LP	1	James Slipper	(substituted off) 57'
Substitutions:
HK	16	Brandon Paenga-Amosa	(substituted on) 72'
PR	17	Angus Bell	(substituted on) 57'
PR	18	Zane Nonggorr	(substituted on) 60'
LK	19	Jeremy Williams	(substituted on) 63'
FL	20	Langi Gleeson	(substituted on) 77'
SH	21	Tate McDermott	(substituted on) 58'
FH	22	Ben Donaldson	(substituted on) 33'
WG	23	Andrew Kellaway	(substituted on) 77'
Coach:
Joe Schmidt

FB	15	Hugo Keenan
RW	14	Tommy Freeman		(substituted off) 37'
OC	13	Huw Jones
IC	12	Bundee Aki
LW	11	Blair Kinghorn
FH	10	Finn Russell
SH	9	Jamison Gibson-Park		(substituted off) 71'
N8	8	Jack Conan		(substituted off) 62'
OF	7	Tom Curry			(substituted off) 68'
BF	6	Tadhg Beirne
RL	5	James Ryan		(substituted off) 42'
LL	4	Maro Itoje (c)		(substituted off) 27'
TP	3	Tadhg Furlong		(substituted off) 57'
HK	2	Dan Sheehan		(substituted off) 57'	(substituted on) 68'
LP	1	Andrew Porter		(substituted off) 42'
Substitutions:
HK	16	Rónan Kelleher	(yellow card) 68'	(substituted on) 57'
PR	17	Ellis Genge		(substituted on) 42'
PR	18	Will Stuart		(substituted on) 57'
LK	19	Ollie Chessum		(substituted on) 27'
FL	20	Jac Morgan		(substituted on) 42'
FL	21	Ben Earl		(substituted on) 62'
SH	22	Alex Mitchell		(substituted on) 71'
FH	23	Owen Farrell		(substituted on) 37'
Coach:
Andy Farrell

Player of the Match:
Tom Hooper (Australia)

Assistant referees:
Ben O'Keeffe (New Zealand)
Andrea Piardi (Italy)
Television match official:
Marius Jonker (South Africa)
Foul play review officer:
Richard Kelly (New Zealand)

== Attendances ==
Attendance figures
Matches	Figures	Average
Tour matches	7	32,903
Attendance	282,019	32,903
Test matches	3	74,283
Attendance	222,848	74,283
Total matches	10	50,487
Attendance	504,867	50,487

Highest/lowest attended matches
Highest attendance	Match
90,307	Second test vs. Australia, Melbourne Cricket Ground
Lowest attendance	Match
23,116	Fifth match vs. ACT Brumbies, Canberra Stadium

== Statistics ==
=== Lions player statistics ===
Key

- Con: Conversions
- Pen: Penalties
- DG: Drop goals
- Pts: Points

Name	Non-Test						Test						Overall						Cards
Name	Played	Tries	Con	Pen	DG	Pts	Played	Tries	Con	Pen	DG	Pts	Played	Tries	Con	Pen	DG	Pts	Cards
Finn Russell	3	0	13	1	0	29	3	0	6	1	0	15	6	0	19	2	0	44	–
Fin Smith	5	0	11	1	0	25	–	–	–	–	–	–	5	0	11	1	0	25	–
Duhan van der Merwe	5	5	0	0	0	25	–	–	–	–	–	–	5	5	0	0	0	25	–
Huw Jones	4	3	0	0	0	15	3	1	0	0	0	5	7	4	0	0	0	20	–
Marcus Smith	6	1	4	0	0	13	1	0	0	1	0	3	7	1	4	1	0	16	–
Dan Sheehan	3	1	0	0	0	5	3	2	0	0	0	10	6	3	0	0	0	15	–
Garry Ringrose	4	3	0	0	0	15	–	–	–	–	–	–	4	3	0	0	0	15	–
Alex Mitchell	6	2	0	0	0	10	2	0	0	0	0	0	8	2	0	0	0	10	–
Tadhg Beirne	4	1	0	0	0	5	3	1	0	0	0	6	7	2	0	0	0	10	–
Jac Morgan	5	1	0	0	0	5	2	1	0	0	0	5	7	2	0	0	0	10	–
Tom Curry	3	0	0	0	0	0	3	2	0	0	0	10	6	2	0	0	0	10	–
Tommy Freeman	3	2	0	0	0	10	3	0	0	0	0	0	6	2	0	0	0	10	–
Sione Tuipulotu	4	1	0	0	0	5	1	1	0	0	0	5	5	2	0	0	0	10	–
Elliot Daly	3	2	0	0	0	10	–	–	–	–	–	–	3	2	0	0	0	10	–
Tomos Williams	2	2	0	0	0	10	–	–	–	–	–	–	2	2	0	0	0	10	–
Jamie Osborne	1	2	0	0	0	10	–	–	–	–	–	–	1	2	0	0	0	10	–
Rónan Kelleher	5	1	0	0	0	5	3	0	0	0	0	0	8	1	0	0	0	5	1 (yellow card)
Will Stuart	4	0	0	0	0	0	3	1	0	0	0	5	7	1	0	0	0	5	–
Bundee Aki	3	1	0	0	0	5	3	0	0	0	0	0	6	1	0	0	0	5	–
Ollie Chessum	3	1	0	0	0	5	3	0	0	0	0	0	6	1	0	0	0	5	–
Maro Itoje	3	1	0	0	0	5	3	0	0	0	0	0	6	1	0	0	0	5	–
Andrew Porter	3	1	0	0	0	5	3	0	0	0	0	0	6	1	0	0	0	5	–
Scott Cummings	5	1	0	0	0	5	–	–	–	–	–	–	5	1	0	0	0	5	–
Hugo Keenan	2	0	0	0	0	0	3	1	0	0	0	5	5	1	0	0	0	5	–
Henry Pollock	5	1	0	0	0	5	–	–	–	–	–	–	5	1	0	0	0	5	1 (yellow card)
Josh van der Flier	5	1	0	0	0	5	–	–	–	–	–	–	5	1	0	0	0	5	–
Joe McCarthy	3	1	0	0	0	5	1	0	0	0	0	0	4	1	0	0	0	5	–
Ben White	3	1	0	0	0	5	–	–	–	–	–	–	3	1	0	0	0	5	–
James Lowe	2	1	0	0	0	5	2	0	0	0	0	0	4	1	0	0	0	5	–
Darcy Graham	1	1	0	0	0	5	–	–	–	–	–	–	1	1	0	0	0	5	–
Ben Earl	5	0	0	0	0	0	2	0	0	0	0	0	7	0	0	0	0	0	–
Tadhg Furlong	4	0	0	0	0	0	3	0	0	0	0	0	7	0	0	0	0	0	–
Ellis Genge	4	0	0	0	0	0	3	0	0	0	0	0	7	0	0	0	0	0	–
Jack Conan	3	0	0	0	0	0	3	0	0	0	0	0	6	0	0	0	0	0	–
James Ryan	4	0	0	0	0	0	2	0	0	0	0	0	6	0	0	0	0	0	–
Finlay Bealham	5	0	0	0	0	0	–	–	–	–	–	–	5	0	0	0	0	0	–
Robbie Henshaw	4	0	0	0	0	0	–	–	–	–	–	–	4	0	0	0	0	0	–
Jamison Gibson-Park	2	0	0	0	0	0	3	0	0	0	0	0	5	0	0	0	0	0	–
Mack Hansen	5	0	0	0	0	0	–	–	–	–	–	–	5	0	0	0	0	0	–
Blair Kinghorn	3	0	0	0	0	0	2	0	0	0	0	0	5	0	0	0	0	0	–
Pierre Schoeman	5	0	0	0	0	0	–	–	–	–	–	–	5	0	0	0	0	0	–
Luke Cowan-Dickie	4	0	0	0	0	0	–	–	–	–	–	–	4	0	0	0	0	0	–
Owen Farrell	2	0	0	0	0	0	2	0	0	0	0	0	4	0	0	0	0	0	–
Ewan Ashman	1	0	0	0	0	0	–	–	–	–	–	–	1	0	0	0	0	0	–
Gregor Brown	1	0	0	0	0	0	–	–	–	–	–	–	1	0	0	0	0	0	–
Tom Clarkson	1	0	0	0	0	0	–	–	–	–	–	–	1	0	0	0	0	0	–
Jamie George	1	0	0	0	0	0	–	–	–	–	–	–	1	0	0	0	0	0	–
Rory Sutherland	1	0	0	0	0	0	–	–	–	–	–	–	1	0	0	0	0	0	–
Zander Fagerson	Did not play – Withdrawn due to injury ahead of tour																		

=== Test match statistics ===
Key

- Con: Conversions
- Pen: Penalties
- DG: Drop goals
- Pts: Points

Name	Team	Tries	Con	Pen	DG	Pts
Finn Russell	British & Irish Lions	–	6	1	–	15
Tom Lynagh	Australia	–	1	4	–	14
Tom Curry	British & Irish Lions	2	–	–	–	10
Max Jorgensen	Australia	2	–	–	–	10
Tate McDermott	Australia	2	–	–	–	10
Dan Sheehan	British & Irish Lions	2	–	–	–	10
Ben Donaldson	Australia	–	4	–	–	8
Tadhg Beirne	British & Irish Lions	1	–	–	–	5
Jake Gordon	Australia	1	–	–	–	5
Huw Jones	British & Irish Lions	1	–	–	–	5
Hugo Keenan	British & Irish Lions	1	–	–	–	5
Jac Morgan	British & Irish Lions	1	–	–	–	5
Dylan Pietsch	Australia	1	–	–	–	5
James Slipper	Australia	1	–	–	–	5
Will Stuart	British & Irish Lions	1	–	–	–	5
Carlo Tizzano	Australia	1	–	–	–	5
Sione Tuipulotu	British & Irish Lions	1	–	–	–	5
Tom Wright	Australia	1	–	–	–	5
Marcus Smith	British & Irish Lions	–	–	1	–	3

== Broadcasting rights ==
Territory	Rights holder	Ref.
Asia (Note: Excluding Japan)	Premier Sports Asia	
Australia	Nine (Note: All Australia matches are televised free-to-air on Nine.); (Stan)	
Baltics: Estonia; Latvia; Lithuania	TV3 (Note: Test matches only)	
Canada	DAZN	
France	L'Équipe	
Germany; Austria; Switzerland	ProSieben Maxx	
Japan	J Sports	
Latin America and Caribbean	ESPN (Caribbean)	
MENA	TOD	
Netherlands	Ziggo Sport	
New Zealand	Sky Sport	
Nordic countries	Viaplay	
Pacific Islands	Digicel	
Portugal	Sport TV	
Spain	Movistar Plus+	
Sub-Saharan Africa	SuperSport	
United Kingdom; Republic of Ireland	Sky Sports; (Now)	
United States	CBS (Note: Test matches only); RugbyPass TV (Note: Non-test matches)	
