= Lington =

Lington is a given name and surname. Notable people with the name include:

- Lington Ieli (born 2004), Australian rugby union player
- Michael Lington (born 1969), Danish-American saxophonist, songwriter, producer, and recording artist
- Otto Lington (1903–1992), Danish composer, bandleader, and violinist
