= Rob Leota =

- Born: Bob Leota; 3 March 1997 (age 29) Preston, Victoria, Australia
- Height: 190 cm (6 ft 3 in)
- Weight: 110 kg (17 st 5 lb; 243 lb)
- School: Thornbury High School

Rugby union career
- Position(s): Flanker, Number 8
- Current team: Bayonne
Amateur team(s)
Years	Team	Apps	(Points)
2020	Eastern Suburbs	5	(0)
- Correct as of 16 July 2022
Senior career
Years	Team	Apps	(Points)
2012–2024	Rebels	87	(52)
2016–2019	Melbourne Rising	21	(6)
2025	Waratahs	11	(15)
2025–	Bayonne	12	(5)
- Correct as of 18 April 2026
International career
Years	Team	Apps	(Points)
2015	Australia Schoolboys	1	(0)
2016	Australia U20	5	(5)
2021–	Australia	21	(10)
2025	First Nations & Pasifika XV	1	(5)
- Correct as of 22 July 2025
Medal record
Boy's rugby sevens
Representing Australia
Commonwealth Youth Games
Silver medal – second place	2015 Apia	Team competition

Robert Leota (born 3 March 1997) is an Australian professional rugby union player who plays as a blind-side flanker and number 8 for Bayonne in the French Top 14. He has spent the majority of his professional playing career at the Melbourne Rebels in Super Rugby, being the first home-grown player to both sign a playing contract for the club, and to be selected as captain. He has internationally represented Australia on 21 occasions .

== Rugby career ==
Leota attended Thornbury High School, and during his junior rugby years, Leota was teammates with actor Jacob Elordi.

Leota made his professional debut for the Melbourne Rebels against the Crusaders as a replacement in a heavy defeat at AMI Stadium.

After the collapse of the Rebels, Leota joined the Waratahs for the 2025 Super Rugby Season

In April 2025, Leota signed a two-year deal with French club Bayonne, beginning in the 2025–26 Top 14 season.

== International rugby career ==
Leota was named in Australia's team for the 2021 Rugby Championship match against South Africa, played on the Gold Coast. He made his test debut in the 74th minute of the match, with Australia winning 28–26 against the World Cup champions.

== Statistics ==
As of 3 June 2023

Season	Team	Games	Starts	Sub	Mins	Tries	Cons	Pens	Drops	Points	Yel	Red
2016	Rebels	1	0	1	27	0	0	0	0	0	0	0
2017	Rebels	0	0	0	0	0	0	0	0	0	0	0
2018	Rebels	0	0	0	0	0	0	0	0	0	0	0
2019	Rebels	13	3	10	394	1	0	0	0	5	0	0
2020	Rebels	6	1	5	129	0	0	0	0	0	0	0
2020 AU	Rebels	6	0	6	108	0	0	0	0	0	0	0
2021 AU	Rebels	7	3	4	304	1	0	0	0	5	0	0
2021 TT	Rebels	5	5	0	376	0	0	0	0	0	0	0
2022	Rebels	6	6	0	445	0	0	0	0	0	0	0
2023	Rebels	0	0	0	0	0	0	0	0	0	0	0
Total		44	18	26	1,772	2	0	0	0	10	0	0

== Personal life ==
Leota is of Samoan heritage.
