= Harrison Goddard =

Australian rugby union player

- Born: Harrison Goddard; 8 April 1998 (age 28) Sydney, New South Wales, Australia
- Height: 1.83 m (6 ft 0 in)
- Weight: 83 kg (13 st 1 lb)
- School: Oakhill College

Rugby union career
- Position: Scrum-half
Amateur team(s)
| Years | Team | Apps | (Points) |
| 2016–2019 | Randwick Rugby Club | | |
| 2020 | Gordon RFC | | |
Senior career
| Years | Team | Apps | (Points) |
| 2016 | Greater Sydney Rams | 3 | (0) |
| 2017–2018 | Melbourne Rising | 15 | (9) |
| 2017−2019 | Rebels | 13 | (0) |
| 2021–2022 | LA Giltinis | 31 | (81) |
| 2023 | Waratahs | 10 | (0) |
| 2024–2025 | Brumbies | 28 | (5) |
| 2025–2026 | Shimizu Blue Sharks | 11 | (20) |
- Correct as of 8 June 2021
International career
| Years | Team | Apps | (Points) |
| 2014–2015 | Australian Schoolboys | 5 | (52) |
| 2017–2018 | Australia U20 | 5 | (56) |
| 2018 | Australia Sevens | 1 | (21) |
| 2025 | First Nations & Pasifika XV | 1 | (0) |
Medal record
Boy's rugby sevens
Representing Australia
Commonwealth Youth Games
| Silver medal – second place | 2015 Apia | Team competition |

Harrison Goddard (born 8 April 1998) is an Australian professional rugby union player of Aboriginal descent who plays for the Shimizu Koto Blue Sharks in Japan. His position is scrum-half.

== Career ==
Goddard previously played scrum-half for the Melbourne Rebels, Waratahs and Brumbies in Super Rugby.

He made his debut for the Rebels against the Waratahs in a defeat for the Rebels.

== Super Rugby statistics ==
As of 16 June 2019

| Season | Team | Games | Starts | Sub | Mins | Tries | Cons | Pens | Drops | Points | Yel | Red |
|---|---|---|---|---|---|---|---|---|---|---|---|---|
| 2017 | Rebels | 1 | 0 | 1 | 5 | 0 | 0 | 0 | 0 | 0 | 0 | 0 |
| 2018 | Rebels | 4 | 0 | 4 | 13 | 0 | 0 | 0 | 0 | 0 | 0 | 0 |
| 2019 | Rebels | 2 | 0 | 2 | 23 | 0 | 0 | 0 | 0 | 0 | 0 | 0 |
| Total | | 7 | 0 | 7 | 41 | 0 | 0 | 0 | 0 | 0 | 0 | 0 |
