= Jac Morgan =

Wales international rugby union player (born 2000)

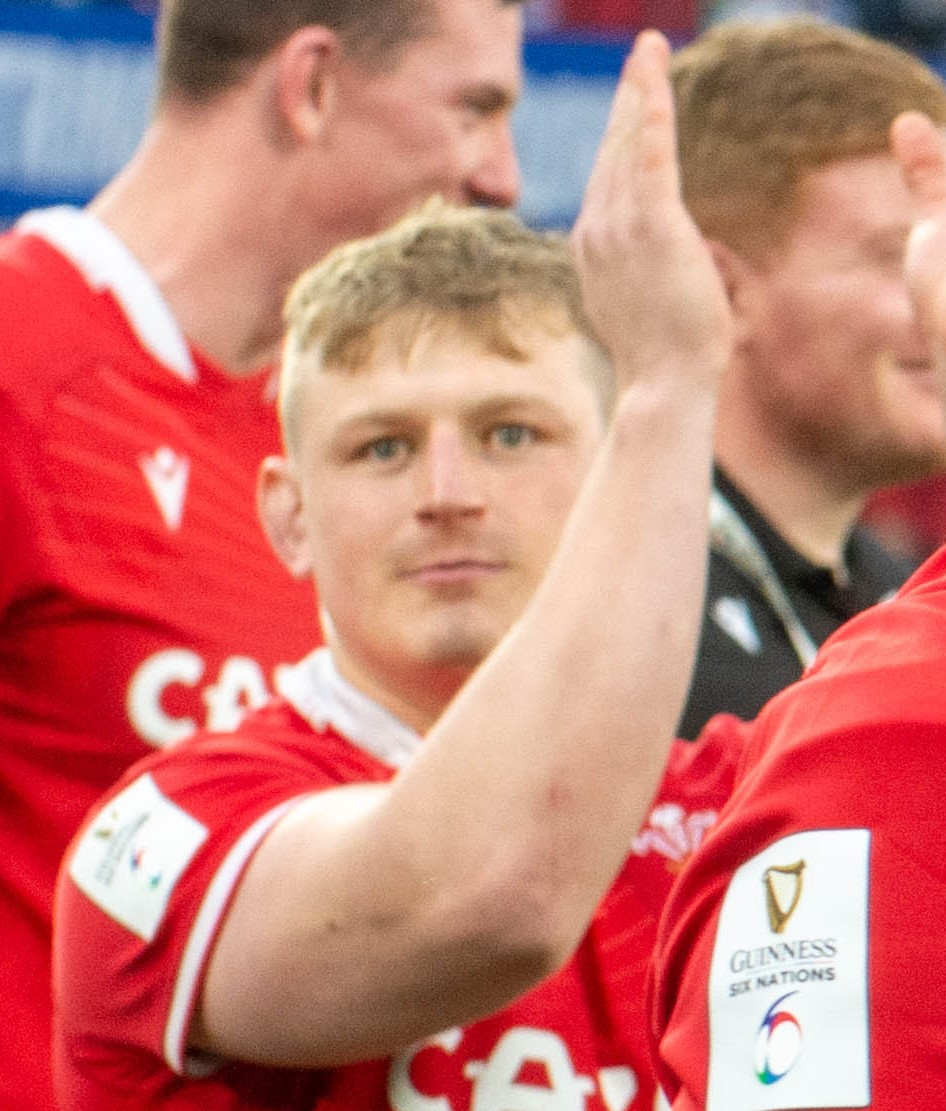
- Morgan playing for Wales at 2023 Six Nations
- Born: Jac Rhys Morgan; 21 January 2000 (age 26) Swansea, Wales
- Height: 181 cm (5 ft 11 in)
- Weight: 104 kg (229 lb; 16 st 5 lb)

Rugby union career
- Position: Flanker
- Current team: Gloucester
Senior career
Years	Team	Apps	(Points)
2019–2021	Scarlets	20	(20)
2021–2026	Ospreys	58	(50)
2026–	Gloucester	6	(10)
- Correct as of 18 November 2026
International career
Years	Team	Apps	(Points)
2018–2020	Wales U20	15	(10)
2022–	Wales	32	(50)
2025	British & Irish Lions	2	(5)
- Correct as of 18 November 2026

Jac Morgan (born 21 January 2000) is a Welsh rugby union player, who plays in the backrow for Gloucester, Wales, and the British and Irish Lions. He is a fluent Welsh speaker.

== Early life ==
Morgan was born in Sketty, Swansea, and grew up in Brynamman. He first began playing rugby at Cwmtwrch RFC where he remained for 10 years, from age 6 to 16. He attended school at Ysgol Dyffryn Aman, and gave up a mechanical engineering apprenticeship to pursue professional rugby union.

== Club career ==
In early 2018, Morgan signed with Aberavon RFC's senior team to play in the Welsh Premiership.

Morgan came through the Scarlets academy and made his debut in the Challenge Cup clash with London Irish in November 2019. Morgan then scored his first professional try in the Pro 14 defeat to Ulster.

After returning from a knee injury in February, Morgan crossed for two tries in a player of the match display against Benetton, before putting in 25 tackles to help the Scarlets claim a crucial victory over Edinburgh. This led to Morgan being voted Scarlets Player of the Month for February.

In March 2021, it was announced that Morgan would join local rivals Ospreys following expiration of his contract. He began his Ospreys career in great form, being awarded player of the match in their 18–10 victory over Munster on 23 October 2021. He was overlooked for selection for the Wales for the upcoming Autumn test series, despite recognition from press and pundits alike.

Morgan was named player of the match on 20 January 2023, scoring an 88th minute try as the Ospreys beat Leicester Tigers at Welford Road, securing their place in the knockouts of the 2022–23 Champions Cup.

In December 2025, he signed for Prem Rugby club Gloucester ahead of the 2026–27 season. Though he was out of contract with the Ospreys at the end of the 2025–26, the decision came alongside the uncertainty of the team being cut altogether as WRU looked to reduce the number of professional teams from four to three.

== International career ==
=== Wales ===
In the summer of 2018, Morgan was selected to compete in the Under-18 International Series in South Africa for Wales.

In the Six Nations Under 20s Championship 2019-20 he captained Wales and achieved more turnovers than any other player in this tournament. He was called up to the senior Wales squad for the 2022 Six Nations Championship.

Morgan made his senior Wales debut on 12 February 2022 in the 20-17 victory over Scotland.

Morgan was controversially dropped by Wales coach Wayne Pivac, ahead of the 2022 tour of South Africa.

Consistent performances for the Ospreys saw him recalled to the Welsh squad for the 2022 end-of-year rugby union internationals. Morgan scored four tries in two matches, gaining plaudits from the press despite an overall poor series for the side.

Morgan retained his place in the Welsh squad for the 2023 Six Nations. He showed his versatility early on in the tournament, starting the first match against Ireland as a blindside flanker, before moving to number eight in the following fixture against Scotland.

He was chosen to co-captain the Welsh squad for the 2023 Rugby World Cup alongside Dewi Lake. Morgan scored tries in the World Cup games against Portugal and Australia.

Morgan was named captain for the 2025 end-of-year rugby union internationals. He left the game against Argentina with a dislocated shoulder and was released from the squad.

It was announced that Morgan would miss the start of the 2026 Six Nations due to the dislocated shoulder he suffered against Argentina, and subsequent surgery.

=== British and Irish Lions ===
On 8 May 2025, Morgan was selected for the British and Irish Lions for their 2025 tour to Australia during the summer. He came off the bench in the second and third tests, scoring a try in the latter. During the second test, Morgan completed a clear-out of the ruck in the lead-up to the Lions' series winning try, which proved decisive in the match and test series.

=== International tries ===
==== Wales ====
Try	Opponent	Location	Venue	Competition	Date	Result
1	Georgia	Cardiff, Wales	Principality Stadium	2022 Autumn Internationals	19 November 2022	Loss
2	Georgia	Cardiff, Wales	Principality Stadium	2022 Autumn Internationals	19 November 2022	Loss
3	Australia	Cardiff, Wales	Principality Stadium	2022 Autumn Internationals	26 November 2022	Loss
4	Australia	Cardiff, Wales	Principality Stadium	2022 Autumn Internationals	26 November 2022	Loss
5	Portugal	Nice, France	Stade de Nice	2023 Rugby World Cup	16 September 2023	Win
6	Australia	Lyon, France	Parc Olympique Lyonnais	2023 Rugby World Cup	24 September 2023	Win
7	Ireland	Cardiff, Wales	Principality Stadium	2025 Six Nations Championship	22 February 2025	Loss
8	Argentina	Cardiff, Wales	Principality Stadium	2025 Autumn Internationals	9 November 2025	Loss
9	Fiji	Cardiff, Wales	Cardiff City Stadium	2026 Nations Championship	4 July 2026	Win
10	Fiji	Cardiff, Wales	Cardiff City Stadium	2026 Nations Championship	4 July 2026	Win

==== British & Irish Lions ====
Try	Opponent	Location	Venue	Competition	Date	Result
1	Australia	Sydney, Australia	Stadium Australia	2025 British & Irish Lions tour to Australia	2 August 2025	Loss
