= Ewan Ashman =

Scotland international rugby union hooker

- Full name: Ewan Philip Fraser Ashman
- Born: 3 April 2000 (age 26) Toronto, Ontario, Canada
- Height: 1.86 m (6 ft 1 in)
- Weight: 113 kg (249 lb; 17 st 11 lb)
- School: Sandbach School

Rugby union career
- Position: Hooker
- Current team: Edinburgh Rugby
Senior career
Years	Team	Apps	(Points)
2017–2018	Sandbach	5	(10)
2018–2023	Sale Sharks	54	(70)
2019	→ Sale (loan)	2	(0)
2021	→ Coventry (loan)	1	(5)
2023–	Edinburgh Rugby	33	(50)
- Correct as of 17 April 2025
International career
Years	Team	Apps	(Points)
2019–2020	Scotland U20	15	(55)
2021–	Scotland	39	(85)
2025	British & Irish Lions	0	(0)
- Correct as of 18 November 2026

Ewan Philip Fraser Ashman (born 3 April 2000) is a professional rugby union player who plays as a hooker for United Rugby Championship club Edinburgh Rugby. Born in Canada and raised in England, he plays for the Scotland national team.

== Professional career ==
=== Club ===
Ashman was born in Toronto, Canada, to a Scottish father and English mother, and moved to England at the age of 4. He started playing rugby at English club Sandbach RUFC. First playing as a centre or a back row, Ashman eventually became a hooker.

He made his senior debut for the Cheshire club in Midlands Premier during the 2017–18 season, also joining Sale Sharks academy in 2017. He joined the Sharks' professional squad ahead of the 2018–19 seasons.

During the next season he was first loaned to Edinburgh as players had left for the World Cup, but never managed to make his professional debut, being blocked by Dave Cherry, Cammy Fenton and Mike Willemse, eventually ending up playing in National League 1 with Sale FC.

Back with the Sharks, Ashman made his Premiership debut on 5 September 2020, coming on as a substitute against Leicester Tigers, in the late post-covid break 2019–20 Premiership Rugby.

On 22 November 2021 it was announced that Ashman would join Glasgow Warriors on loan, but he returned to Sale Sharks four days later due to an injury crisis.

In April 2023 it was announced that Ashman would leave Sale at the end of the season to rejoin Edinburgh Rugby on a four year deal. Following a standout 2025/26 season where he finished Edinburgh's top try scorer and won the club's player and players' player of the season awards, Ashman extended his contract for a further 3 years until 2030.

=== International ===
He played for Scotland from under 16 level, qualifying through his Edinburgh-born father. He played for Scotland U20s in the 2019 U20 Six Nations and the 2019 World Championship, where despite Scotland's disappointing run, he finished as the tournament's top try scorer with seven.

He also took part in the 2020 U20 Six Nations, starting all of Scotland five games, and becoming the top try scorer as his team ended second in this unfinished edition standings.

In the 2020–21 season he earned his first call-ups for the Scotland senior team under Gregor Townsend, both during the Autumn Nations Cup and before the 2021 Six Nations. He earned his first cap and scored his first international try on 7 November 2021 at Murrayfield in a closely won victory over Australia after coming on as an early substitute for George Turner. In 2023 Ashman was selected in the 33 player squad for the 2023 Rugby World Cup in France.

On 7 November 2026, Ashman Scored a Hat-trick of tries against The All Blacks during the 2026 Nations Championship. Making him only the fifth player in the history of International Rugby to do so.

=== British & Irish Lions ===
He was not selected in the initial squad for the 2025 British & Irish Lions tour to Australia, but was subsequently called up ahead of the test series getting underway. He made an appearance in the final midweek match against the First Nations and Pasifika XV, becoming Lion #888.

== Career statistics ==
=== List of international tries ===
No.	Date	Venue	Opponent	Score	Result	Competition
1	7 November 2021	Murrayfield Stadium, Edinburgh, Scotland	Australia	12–10	15–13	2021 end-of-year rugby union internationals
2	16 July 2022	Estadio Único Madre de Ciudades, Santiago del Estero, Argentina	Argentina	12–10	34–31	2022 mid-year rugby union internationals
3	16 July 2022	Estadio Único Madre de Ciudades, Santiago del Estero, Argentina	Argentina	19–13	34–31	2022 mid-year rugby union internationals
4	7 October 2023	Stade de France, Paris, France	Ireland	36–5	36–14	2023 Rugby World Cup
5	12 July 2024	Audi Field, Washington DC, United States of America	United States	12–0	42–7	2024 mid-year rugby union tests
6	12 July 2024	Audi Field, Washington DC, United States of America	United States	19–0	42–7	2024 mid-year rugby union tests
7	12 July 2024	Audi Field, Washington DC, United States of America	United States	26–7	42–7	2024 mid-year rugby union tests
8	27 July 2024	Estadio Charrúa, Montevideo, Uruguay	Uruguay	5-0	31–19	2024 mid-year rugby union tests
9	8 November 2025	Murrayfield Stadium, Edinburgh, Scotland	New Zealand	5-17	17-25	2025 end-of-year rugby union internationals
10	16 November 2025	Murrayfield Stadium, Edinburgh, Scotland	Argentina	12-0	24-33	[2025 end-of-year rugby union internationals]]
11	16 November 2025	Murrayfield Stadium, Edinburgh, Scotland	Argentina	19-0	24-33	[2025 end-of-year rugby union internationals]]
12	7 November 2026	Murrayfield Stadium, Edinburgh, Scotland	New Zealand	5-5	21-43	2026 Nations Championship
13	7 November 2026	Murrayfield Stadium, Edinburgh, Scotland	New Zealand	12–17	21-43	2026 Nations Championship
14	7 November 2026	Murrayfield Stadium, Edinburgh, Scotland	New Zealand	19–24	21-43	2026 Nations Championship

as of 8 November 2026
