= Rónan Kelleher =

Irish rugby union player

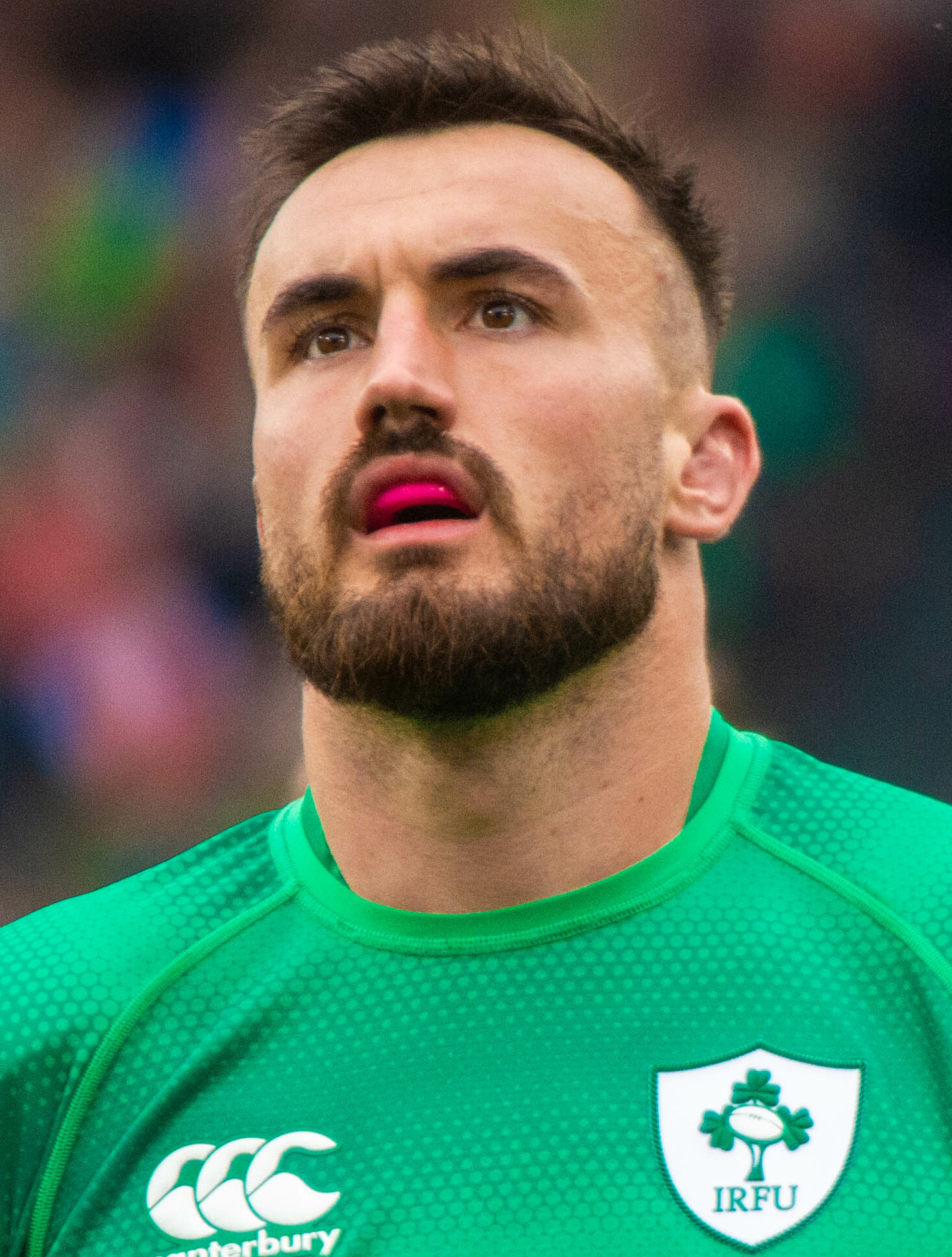
- Kelleher representing Ireland during the 2023 Six Nations against Italy
- Born: 24 January 1998 (age 28) Dublin, Ireland
- Height: 1.83 m (6 ft 0 in)
- Weight: 110 kg (243 lb; 17 st 5 lb)
- School: St. Michael's College
- Notable relative: Cian Kelleher (brother)

Rugby union career
- Position: Hooker
- Current team: Leinster
Senior career
Years	Team	Apps	(Points)
2019–	Leinster	88	(105)
- Correct as of 21 March 2026
International career
Years	Team	Apps	(Points)
2017–2018	Ireland U20	11	(10)
2020–	Ireland	55	(50)
2021, 2025	British & Irish Lions	3	(0)
- Correct as of 21 November 2026

Rónan Kelleher (born 24 January 1998) is an Irish professional rugby union player who plays as a hooker for United Rugby Championship club Leinster and the Ireland national team.

== Early life ==
Kelleher was initially an outside back and then a back-row for much of his underage years. He then transitioned to prop, before finally settling on hooker. He attended St. Michael's College, Dublin where his father was principal. His older brother Cian Kelleher is a fellow professional rugby union player.

== Club career ==
Kelleher came up through the Leinster Academy.

He scored both tries as Leinster A beat the Scarlets Premiership Select side 15–8 to win the final of the inaugural Celtic Cup in 2018. He made his senior Leinster debut in February 2019 against Southern Kings.

== International career ==
=== Ireland ===
Kelleher represented the Ireland under-20s at both the 2017 World Rugby Under 20 Championship and the 2018 Six Nations Under 20s Championship, playing 11 games and scoring two tries.

Kelleher received his first call up to the senior Ireland squad on 15 January 2020 for the 2020 Six Nations Championship. He made his debut as a replacement against Scotland on 1 February 2020. Kelleher scored his first international try versus France on 14 February 2021 during the 2021 Six Nations.

Kelleher tied the record for most tries scored by an Irish player in a test match, by scoring four tries for Ireland in a 71–10 victory over the United States on 10 July 2021.

=== British & Irish Lions ===
Kelleher joined the 2021 British & Irish Lions pre tour training camp in Jersey, as informal cover for hooker due to the unavailability of touring hookers Jamie George and Luke Cowan-Dickie. Kelleher was not added to the touring party at the time, but was called up to the Lions squad in South Africa on 15 July.
