= Tom Hooper (rugby union) =

Australian rugby union player

- Born: 29 January 2001 (age 25) Bathurst, New South Wales, Australia
- Height: 1.99 m (6 ft 6 in)
- Weight: 122 kg (269 lb; 19 st 3 lb)
- School: St Stanislaus' College
- Notable relative: Lachlan Hooper (brother)

Rugby union career
- Position(s): Flanker, Lock
- Current team: Exeter Chiefs
Senior career
Years	Team	Apps	(Points)
2021–2025	ACT Brumbies	53	(5)
2025–	Exeter Chiefs	23	(0)
- Correct as of 30 August 2026
International career
Years	Team	Apps	(Points)
2024	Australia A	1	(0)
2023–	Australia	25	(10)
- Correct as of 27 September 2026

Tom Hooper (born 29 January 2001) is an Australian professional rugby union player who plays as a flanker for Premiership Rugby club Exeter Chiefs and the Australia national team.

== Career ==
Hooper was named in the Brumbies squad for the Super Rugby Trans-Tasman and the following 2021 Super Rugby AU season. He made his debut in round 1 of Super Rugby Trans-Tasman in the match against the Crusaders and played all 5 games, coming off the bench for all games. In 2021 Hooper made 12 appearances including 2 starts in the finals series.

In the 2023 Super Rugby Pacific season Hooper started the season injured, making his season debut in Round 11, playing the remaining 7 games of the season including 2 games in the finals.

Hooper left the Brumbies at the end of the 2025 season to join the Premiership club Exeter Chiefs in England.

In July 2026, Hooper was confirmed to be joining the Queensland Reds on a two-year in the Super Rugby beginning in the 2029 season. The news of his signing was made amid his contract extension with Exeter, staying with the club through to the 2027–28 Premiership season.

== International career ==
In July 2023 Hooper was selected for the Wallabies, starting at number 6 against South Africa. He earned another 2 caps against New Zealand, scoring a try in the second Bledisloe Cup test and leading the tackle count in both tests.

In August 2023 Hooper was named in the Wallabies squad for the 2023 Rugby World Cup and started in the back row for all four of the Wallabies pool matches.

Hooper was a fringe player in 2024 under new coach Joe Schmidt, making only two appearances off the bench against Georgia in a mid-season test and South Africa in the Rugby Championship. He was selected in the greater squad for the Grand Slam Spring Tour, but only featured in the two matches for Australia XV/Australia A against Bristol and England A.

After a superb 2025 Super Rugby campaign where he finished runner up in the Player of the Year Award, Hooper again broke into the national first-team contention, gaining selection on the bench for the Wallabies opening test again Fiji. He would also feature prominently in the 2025 British and Irish Lions Tour, gaining selection on the bench in the first test and concluded with a player of the match performance in the Wallabies' victory in third and final test.

== Personal life ==
In 2024, Hooper was a guest on Guy Montgomery's Guy Mont-Spelling Bee.
