= Kalani Thomas =

Australian rugby union player

- Born: 18 April 2002 (age 24) Darwin, Northern Territory, Australia
- Height: 178 cm (5 ft 10 in)
- Weight: 85 kg (187 lb; 13 st 5 lb)

Rugby union career
- Position: Scrum-half
- Current team: Reds
Senior career
| Years | Team | Apps | (Points) |
| 2021– | Reds | 78 | (17) |
| 2022–2023 | Auckland | 10 | (20) |
- Correct as of 6 June 2026
International career
| Years | Team | Apps | (Points) |
| 2022 | Australia U20 | 2 | (0) |
| 2025 | ANZAC XV | 1 | (0) |
| 2025 | First Nations & Pasifika XV | 1 | (0) |
| 2025– | Australia | 3 | (0) |
- Correct as of 17 October 2026

Kalani Thomas (born 18 April 2002) is an Australian rugby union player who currently plays as a scrum-half for the Reds in Super Rugby and the Australia national team.

== Early life ==
Thomas was born in 2002 in Darwin, Northern Territory. He is of Māori heritage.

== Career ==
=== Reds ===
He was named in the Reds squad for the 2021 Super Rugby AU season. He made his debut for the Reds in Round 6 of the 2021 Super Rugby AU season against the Waratahs, coming on as a replacement.

=== Auckland ===
Thomas was announced in Auckland's 2023 squad ahead of the 2023 season. Thomas played in ten of their season games, scoring four tries.

== International career ==
He was named in the Wallabies squad for the 2025 Northern tour. He made his debut for Australia in the final match of the tour against France, coming on as a replacement.

== Career statistics ==
=== Club ===
As of 18 August 2026.

Statistics by club, season and competition
| Club | Season | League | | | | | | |
| Club | Season | Division | Apps | Tries | Con. | Pen. | Drop | Points |
|---|---|---|---|---|---|---|---|---|
| Reds | 2021 | Super Rugby AU | 5 | 0 | 0 | 0 | 0 | 0 |
| Reds | 2021 | Super Rugby Trans-Tasman | 3 | 1 | 0 | 0 | 0 | 5 |
| Reds | 2022 | Super Rugby Pacific | 10 | 0 | 0 | 0 | 0 | 0 |
| Reds | 2023 | Super Rugby Pacific | 13 | 0 | 0 | 0 | 0 | 0 |
| Reds | Total | | 31 | 1 | 0 | 0 | 0 | 5 |
| Auckland | 2023 | National Provincial Championship | 10 | 4 | 0 | 0 | 0 | 20 |
| Reds | 2024 | Super Rugby Pacific | 15 | 0 | 0 | 0 | 0 | 0 |
| Reds | 2025 | Super Rugby Pacific | 15 | 1 | 1 | 0 | 0 | 7 |
| Reds | 2026 | Super Rugby Pacific | 13 | 1 | 0 | 0 | 0 | 5 |
| Reds | Total | | 43 | 2 | 1 | 0 | 0 | 12 |
| Career total | | | 84 | 7 | 1 | 0 | 0 | 36 |

=== International ===
As of 18 August 2026.

Statistics by team and year
| Team | Year | Statistic | | |
| Team | Year | Apps | Tries | Points |
|---|---|---|---|---|
| Australia | 2025 | 1 | 0 | 0 |
| Total | | 1 | 0 | 0 |
