= Tom Clarkson (rugby union) =

Irish rugby union player

Thomas Clarkson
- Born: Tommaso Clarkson; 22 February 2000 (age 26) Dublin, Ireland
- Height: 1.83 m (6 ft 0 in)
- Weight: 124 kg (19.5 st; 273 lb)
- School: Blackrock College
- University: Trinity College Dublin

Rugby union career
- Position: Prop
Amateur team(s)
Years	Team	Apps	(Points)
- Dublin University
Senior career
Years	Team	Apps	(Points)
2020–	Leinster	72	(25)
- Correct as of 21 March 2026
International career
Years	Team	Apps	(Points)
2019–2020	Ireland U20	16	(10)
2024–	Ireland	16	(5)
2025	British & Irish Lions	0	(0)
- Correct as of 21 October 2026

Thomas Clarkson (born 22 February 2000), born Tommaso Clarkson, is an Irish rugby union player who plays for Leinster and Ireland. He plays as a prop.

== Early life ==
Born in Dublin, Clarkson attended Blackrock College and won a Leinster Schools Rugby Senior Cup with the school in 2018, alongside fellow Leinster academy member Liam Turner. Clarkson's mother Nina Cafolla comes from a small town between Rome and Naples. After leaving school, he joined Dublin University, the club representing Trinity College Dublin, in the amateur All-Ireland League.

== Leinster ==
Clarkson joined the Leinster academy ahead of the 2019–20 season. He made his senior debut for the province on 29 August 2020 as a 63rd minute replacement for Michael Bent in their 28–10 derby victory against Ulster.

== Ireland ==
Ever-present as the team's tighthead prop, Clarkson was a key player for the Ireland under-20s team that won a grand slam during the 2019 Six Nations Under 20s Championship. He also represented the team at the 2019 World Rugby Under 20 Championship, and was vice-captain of the side during the 2020 Six Nations Under 20s Championship, where they secured consecutive triple crown's, though the tournament was cancelled with two rounds still to be played due to the COVID-19 pandemic.

At the start of the 2023/24 season, Clarkson turned down an offer to play for Italy whom he qualified to play for through his Italian mother. Clarkson debuted for Ireland in the November 2024 Autumn Nations Series coming off the bench to replace Finlay Bealham in 22-19 win over Argentina.

He was named on the bench for the opening round of the 2025 Six Nations to make his tournament debut. In February 2025, he was named in the starting lineup for the first time for the fixture against Wales.

== Lions ==
In July 2025 Clarkson was called up to the Lions squad to provide additional front row cover for their 2025 tour of Australia.

== Honours ==
=== Blackrock College ===
- Leinster Schools Rugby Senior Cup:
  - Winner (1): 2018

=== Leinster ===
- Pro14:
  - Winner (2): 2020, 2021
- United Rugby Championship
  - Winner (1): 2024–25

=== Ireland Under-20s ===
- Six Nations Under 20s Championship:
  - Winner (1): 2019
- Grand Slam:
  - Winner (1): 2019
- Triple Crown:
  - Winner (2): 2019, 2020

=== Ireland ===
- Triple Crown:
  - Winner (1): 2025
