= Nick Champion de Crespigny =

Australia international rugby union player

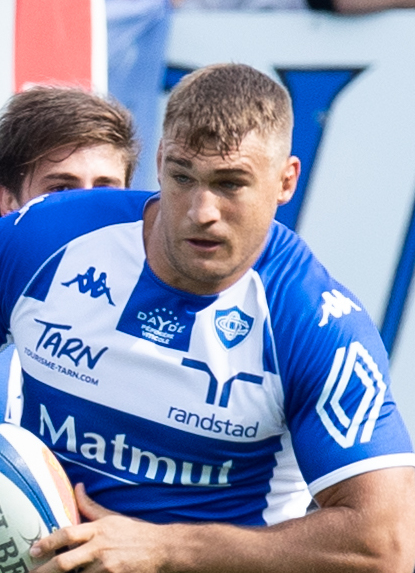
- Champion de Crespigny with Castres Olympique in 2022
- Full name: Richard Nicholas Champion de Crespigny
- Born: 27 June 1996 (age 30) Canberra, Australian Capital Territory, Australia
- Height: 1.91 m (6 ft 3 in)
- Weight: 110 kg (17 st 5 lb; 243 lb)
- School: Canberra Grammar School
- University: University of Sydney
- Notable relative: Rafe de Crespigny (grandfather)

Rugby union career
- Position(s): Flanker, Number eight
- Current team: Western Force
Amateur team(s)
| Years | Team | Apps | (Points) |
| 2015–2021 | Sydney University | 69 | (25) |
Senior career
| Years | Team | Apps | (Points) |
| 2018−2019 | NSW Country Eagles | 11 | (0) |
| 2021−2024 | Castres Olympique | 56 | (5) |
| 2025− | Western Force | 24 | (0) |
International career
| Years | Team | Apps | (Points) |
| 2025– | Australia | 6 | (5) |
- Correct as of 10 October 2026

Richard Nicholas Champion de Crespigny (French pronunciation: [nikk ʃɑ̃pjõ də kɾɛspiɲi]; born 27 June 1996) is an Australian rugby union player and former youth rower, who currently plays in the back row for Super Rugby club the Western Force and the Australia national team. From 2021 to 2024 he played in France for Castres Olympique in the Top 14.

== Early and personal life ==
Champion de Crespigny was born: Richard Nicholas Champion de Crespigny, and raised in the Australian capital of Canberra, Australian Capital Territory (ACT). He has said that his surname, Champion de Crespigny, is of Norman origin in Northern France, where his family comes from. He started playing rugby union at the age of 8-years-old for his local school, Canberra Grammar School. Champion de Crespigny studied at Canberra Grammar from 2002 to 2014. Passionate about rowing throughout his high school years, Champion de Crespigny took part in the 2013 Australian Youth Olympic Festival (AYOF) in Sydney, while also rowing in the school's 1st VIII for three years. Champion de Crespigny also played in Canberra Grammar's 1st XV in 2013 and 2014, and further played for the ACT Brumbies Schools Team in 2014 at the Australian Rugby Championship.

After high school, Champion de Crespigny moved to Sydney, New South Wales to study a Bachelor of Economics (BEc) at the University of Sydney. He joined the Sydney University Football Club to play in the Shute Shield. Champion de Crespigny played with SUFC 1st Colts in 2015 and 2016 winning back-to-back championships. In 2016, he made his 1st Grade debut for SUFC, represented the New South Wales Waratahs Under-20s Team and was a member of the Australia under-20s extended squad.

== Career ==
=== Sydney University ===
Champion de Crespigny played with the SUFC First Grade team from 2017 to 2021, winning consecutive Shute Shield Titles in 2018 and 2019, and playing over 75 First Grade games. Nick was awarded his Rugby Blue in 2018 by the University of Sydney in recognition of his academic and sporting performance, and further awarded SUFC First Grade Best Forward in 2018, 2019 and 2020.

=== NSW Country Eagles ===
In 2018 and 2019 Champion de Crespigny was a member of the New South Wales Country Eagles team in the National Rugby Championship (NRC). In the same year, he was invited to play in an exhibition match with the Melbourne Rebels against the Western Force in their World Series competition. He spent the 2019 Super Rugby pre-season with the Melbourne Rebels, playing in a pre-season matches. Champion de Crespigny spent the 2020 Super Rugby pre-season with the New South Wales Waratahs extended training squad. He played several games in pre-season matches, and throughout the season for the Waratah's A team.

=== Castres Olympique ===
In June 2021, Champion de Crespigny was recruited by Castres Olympique for the 2021–22 season to play in the Top 14 and Champions Cup. Nick was recruited by Head Coach at the time Pierre Henry-Broncan, who had been following him for several seasons in Australia and liked his physicality. Nick made his debut for Castres Olympique in Round 2 of the Top 14 season on 10 September 2021, starting at blindside flanker in their win over Clermont Auvergne. In Champion de Crespigny's first season with Castres Olympic (2021–2022), the team finished 1st in the regular Top 14 Season for the first time in the history of the club. Champion de Crespigny played at openside flanker in the Top 14 Grand Final in Paris where the team lost to Montpellier 29–10, finishing up the 2021–22 season in second place. Champion de Crespigny re-signed with Castres Olympic for 2 additional seasons until July 2024. In his first two seasons with Castres Olympic he played 39 matches across the Top 14 and European Championship, 38 of which he was named as a starting player.

=== Western Force ===
In July 2024, the Western Force announced they had signed Champion de Crespigny for the 2025 season. After starting in all three of their opening games for 2025, it was announced that Champion de Crespigny had re-signed with the Western Force until the conclusion of the 2028 season. Champion de Crespigny played a total of 12 games for the Western Force in 2025, shifting positions between blindside flanker and number eight.

== International career ==
In July 2025, Champion de Crespigny was called-up to the Australia national team ahead of their first test against the British & Irish Lions. Being selected to replace injured back-rowers Rob Valetini and Langi Gleeson, Champion de Crespigny had been primed for the British & Irish Lions the previous month as the Western Force played host to the team at Perth Stadium. Champion de Crespigny made his international debut on 19 July 2025 against the British & Irish Lions. Australia lost 19–27. Champion de Crespigny was not named in the squad again for the remainder of the Lions tour. The following month, Champion de Crespigny was named in the Australia squad for the 2025 Rugby Championship ahead of their match against South Africa.

In October 2025, Champion de Crespigny became the 92nd captain of the Wallabies, leading Australia to a 19–15 victory over Japan in Tokyo and scoring a try in the match.

== Honours ==
Sydney University

- Shute Shield:
  - Winner: 2018, 2019

Castres Olympique

- Top 14:
  - Runner-up: 2021–22
