= Darcy Swain =

Australia international rugby union player (born 1997)

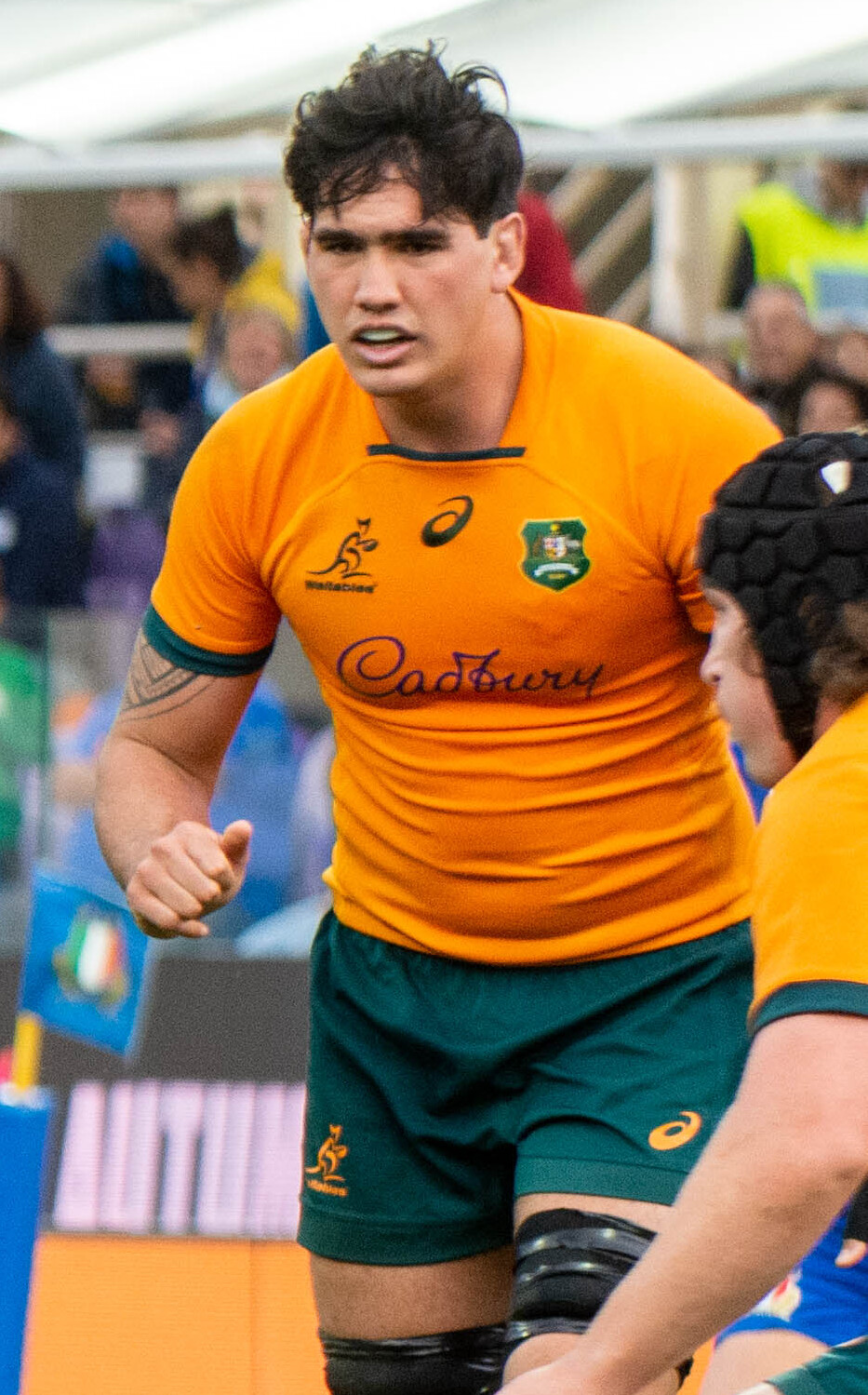
- Swain with Australia in 2022
- Born: Darcy Taimua Swain; 5 July 1997 (age 29) Babinda, Queensland, Australia
- Height: 200 cm (6 ft 7 in)
- Weight: 113 kg (17 st 11 lb; 249 lb)
- School: Brisbane Boys' College

Rugby union career
- Position: Lock
- Current team: Western Force
Senior career
Years	Team	Apps	(Points)
2016–2019	Canberra Vikings	23	(10)
2018–2024	Brumbies	78	(10)
2025–	Western Force	27	(10)
- Correct as of 30 May 2026
International career
Years	Team	Apps	(Points)
2021–2022	Australia	17	(0)
2023	Australia A	1	(0)
2025	First Nations & Pasifika XV	1	(0)
- Correct as of 22 July 2025

Darcy Taimua Swain (born 5 July 1997) is an Australian rugby union player who currently plays for the ASM https://www.asm-rugby.com/ and previously played for the Wallabies, and Western Force + Brumbies in the Super Rugby. His position of choice is lock.

== Early life ==
Born in the north Queensland town of Babinda, Swain grew up in nearby Cairns until he was 15, when he was scouted by Brisbane Boys' College and offered a scholarship to finish his schooling there. During his final year of school, the Tuggeranong Vikings along with the Brumbies offered Swain a move to Canberra to play for the Brumbies U20s team, and ultimately the National Rugby Championship team Canberra Vikings.

== Career ==
In 2017, Swain was included in the Brumbies' squad for a friendly in Singapore. He made his Super Rugby debut in 2018 against the Jaguares. He continued to play mostly off the bench in 2018 and 2019 before starting 13 games at lock in the 2020 Super Rugby AU season.

In July 2020, Swain made his Wallabies debut, coming off the bench against France and earned another 9 caps that year against New Zealand, South Africa, Japan and Argentina. He added a further 6 caps in 2021.

In May 2024, it was announced by the Western Force that Swain had signed a two year contract to play with them during the 2025 and 2026 seasons.

== Personal life ==
Swain is of Samoan heritage.
