= Mesake Doge =

Fijian rugby union player (born 1993)

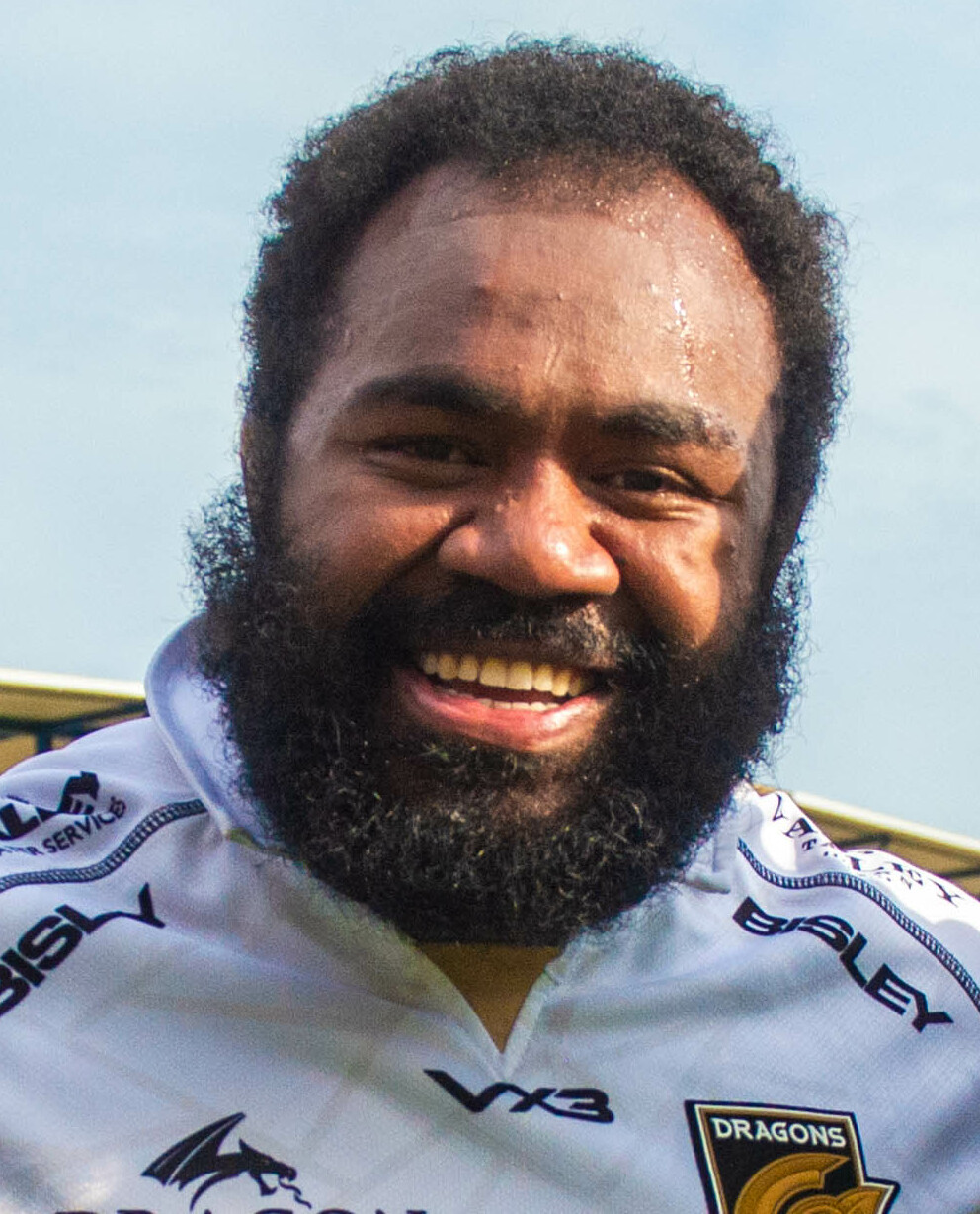
- Born: 1 April 1993 (age 33) Suva, Fiji
- Height: 1.78 m (5 ft 10 in)
- Weight: 122 kg (19.2 st; 269 lb)

Rugby union career
- Position: Prop
- Current team: Fijian Drua
Senior career
Years	Team	Apps	(Points)
2018–2019	Rugby Timișoara	4	(5)
2019–2021	Brive	24	(10)
2021–2022	Dragons	16	(25)
2023–	Fijian Drua	44	(20)
- Correct as of 29 May 2026
International career
Years	Team	Apps	(Points)
2016–	Fiji	30	(15)
2025	First Nations & Pasifika XV	1	(0)
- Correct as of 24 October 2026

Mesake Doge (born 1 April 1993) is a Fijian rugby union player, currently playing for the Fijian Drua in Super Rugby. He previously played for United Rugby Championship side Dragons. His preferred position is prop.

== Professional career ==
Doge represented Rugby Timișoara during the 2018–19 European Rugby Challenge Cup. He joined Brive in 2019, making 24 appearances over two seasons. In July 2021, he joined Dragons. Doge plays internationally for the Fiji national rugby union team, having made his debut in 2016. He won two further caps against New Zealand in 2021.
