= Ben White (rugby union, born 1998) =

British Lions & Scotland international rugby union player

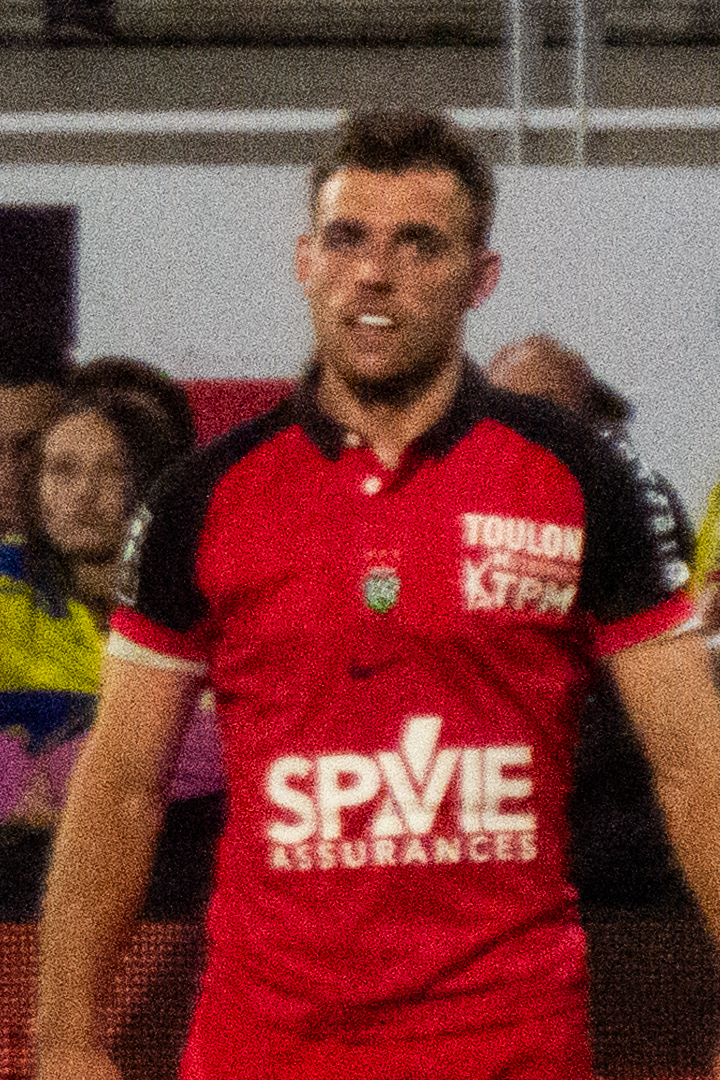
- Full name: Benjamin James White
- Born: 27 May 1998 (age 28) Stoke-on-Trent, England
- Height: 1.78 m (5 ft 10 in)
- Weight: 88 kg (194 lb; 13 st 12 lb)
- School: Denstone College; Leicester Grammar School

Rugby union career
- Position: Scrum-half
- Current team: Toulon
Senior career
| Years | Team | Apps | (Points) |
| 2015–2021 | Leicester Tigers | 71 | (30) |
| 2016–2017 | → Doncaster Knights (loan) | 11 | (30) |
| 2021–2023 | London Irish | 44 | (45) |
| 2023– | Toulon | 48 | (25) |
- Correct as of 16 March 2024
International career
| Years | Team | Apps | (Points) |
| 2018 | England U20s | 11 | (20) |
| 2022– | Scotland | 40 | (50) |
| 2025 | British & Irish Lions | 0 | (0) |
- Correct as of 18 November 2026

Benjamin James White (born 27 May 1998) is a Scottish professional rugby union player who plays as a scrum-half for Top 14 club Toulon. Born in England, he represents Scotland at international level after qualifying on ancestry grounds.

== Club career ==
=== Leicester Tigers ===
White made his first senior Tigers appearance aged 17, against Argentina at Welford Road in Marcos Ayerza's testimonial fixture in the build up to the 2015 Rugby World Cup.

White then made his Premiership debut against Harlequins on 25 October 2015; at the age of 17 years and 151 days White became the youngest player to play for Leicester in the Premiership.

White, a member of the Tigers Academy, captained the Tigers U18 Academy League Team, the Premiership 7's team and ultimately captained the Tigers 1st 15 in the Premiership, aged 21. On the 16 June 2021 Leicester Tigers announced his release.

White is also the youngest professional player in Doncaster Knights history having made his debut against London Welsh on 23 April 2016, whilst on loan from Leicester.

=== London Irish ===
White joined Premiership Rugby side London Irish ahead of the 2021–22 season.

=== Toulon ===
On 2 July 2023, after London Irish entered administration, White signed for French giants Toulon in the Top 14 competition from the 2023–24 season.

== International career ==
=== England U20 and England XV ===
White, who represented England at U17's, featured for England U18-s in all of their 2016 Six Nations matches in 2016. On 3 January 2018 White was named in England under-20s squad for the 2018 U-20s Six Nations Championship, and he captained England under-20s.

White started for England under-20s in the 2018 Rugby World Cup Final against France, having started the semi-final against South Africa and being involved in every Pool game.

After a breakthrough year for Leicester in 2018–19, White was named in a squad for an uncapped England match against the Barbarians.

=== Scotland ===
White qualifies for Scotland through having a Scottish grandfather. In January 2022 White was named in the Scotland squad for the 2022 6 Nations Championship. White was named as a replacement for Scotland's opening game of the Six Nations against England.

Due to his form with London Irish during the 2022/23 English Premiership, he was selected as starting scrum-half for the Scotland team which won a third consecutive Calcutta Cup and a second away win at Twickenham in the opening round of the 2023 Guinness Six Nations.

In 2023 White was selected in Scotland's 33 player squad for the 2023 Rugby World Cup in France.

=== British & Irish Lions ===
White was called up to the 2025 British & Irish Lions tour to Australia as a replacement for the injured Tomos Williams.

He made his debut in the third tour match in Australia, a 10-21 victory over NSW Waratahs, becoming Lion #883.

== Career statistics ==
=== List of international tries ===
| No. | Date | Venue | Opponent | Score | Result | Competition | Ref. |
|---|---|---|---|---|---|---|---|
| 1 | 5 February 2022 | Murrayfield Stadium, Edinburgh, Scotland | England | 5–3 | 20–17 | 2022 Six Nations Championship | |
| 2 | 5 November 2022 | Murrayfield Stadium, Edinburgh, Scotland | Fiji | 26–12 | 28–12 | 2022 end-of-year rugby union internationals | |
| 3 | 4 February 2023 | Twickenham Stadium, London, England | England | 24–20 | 29–23 | 2023 Six Nations Championship | |
| 4 | 10 February 2024 | Murrayfield Stadium, Edinburgh, Scotland | France | 5–0 | 16–20 | 2024 Six Nations Championship | |
| 5 | 1 February 2025 | Murrayfield Stadium, Edinburgh, Scotland | Italy | 19–6 | 31–19 | 2025 Six Nations Championship | |
| 6 | 9 February 2025 | Murrayfield Stadium, Edinburgh, Scotland | Ireland | 16–32 | 18–32 | 2025 Six Nations Championship | |
| 7 | 22 February 2025 | Twickenham Stadium, London, England | England | 5-0 | 15-16 | 2025 Six Nations Championship | |
| 8 | 14 February 2026 | Murrayfield Stadium, Edinburgh, Scotland | England | 16–32 | 31–20 | 2026 Six Nations Championship | |
| 9 | 7 March 2026 | Murrayfield Stadium, Edinburgh, Scotland | France | 24-14 | 50-40 | 2026 Six Nations Championship | |
| 10 | 11 July 2026 | Loftus Versfeld Stadium, Pretoria, South Africa | South Africa | 26-36 | 28-42 | Nations Championship | |

as of 11 July 2025
