= Andy Muirhead (rugby union) =

Australian rugby union player

- Born: 8 July 1993 (age 33) Brisbane, Queensland, Australia
- Height: 183 cm (6 ft 0 in)
- Weight: 84 kg (13 st 3 lb; 185 lb)

Rugby union career
- Position(s): Wing, Fullback
Senior career
Years	Team	Apps	(Points)
2015	Counties Manukau	3	(0)
2016	Brisbane City	2	(0)
2017–	Canberra Vikings	22	(61)
- Correct as of 1 March 2026
Super Rugby
Years	Team	Apps	(Points)
2017–	Brumbies	124	(200)
- Correct as of 5 June 2026
International career
Years	Team	Apps	(Points)
2025	First Nations & Pasifika XV	1	(0)

Andy Muirhead (born 8 July 1993) is an Australian rugby union player who plays for the Brumbies in the Super Rugby competition. His position of choice is wing.

Muirhead was born and raised in Brisbane, where he attended Brisbane State High School (BSHS), playing for their 1st XV rugby team. Following school he signed with the South Brisbane Magpies in the Brisbane Premier Rugby competition. He played for the club until 2014. Andy then took up an opportunity to move to New Zealand and play in the ITM cup with Counties Manukau RFU and under head coach, and All Blacks great, Tana Umaga. Muirhead made the move back to Australia in 2015, helping Souths win the Premier Rugby title that year. Following a stellar season he was chosen to play with Brisbane City in the NRC rugby competition. Towards the end of 2016 Muirhead moved to Canberra for an opportunity to train with the ACT Brumbies. In 2017 Andy was rewarded with an opportunity to join their tour of South Africa and Argentina. Debuting off the bench, Andy scored two tries and had a very strong finish to the season. For his efforts he was rewarded a full-time contract with the Brumbies where he remains.

Since his debut Andy has represented the ACT Brumbies more than 90 times and was also selected in the Wallabies squad in 2021.

Muirhead is Aboriginal Australian, through his mother
