= ANZAC XV =

Combined rugby union team

The ANZAC XV was a rugby union team made up of players eligible to represent either Australia or New Zealand, which played against the British Lions in 1989. The name ANZAC comes from Australia and New Zealand's involvement in World War I. In 1989, the team was intended to combine many Wallabies and All Blacks, but most New Zealand players dropped out of the squad before the match.

In 2025, a similar team, the AUNZ Invitational XV. played against the British & Irish Lions in Adelaide during the Lions' 2025 tour of Australia.

== History ==
=== 1989 British Lions tour ===
The team was first established for the 1989 British Lions tour of Australia. After an initial selection that included seven New Zealand players (Richard Loe, Frano Botica, Wayne Shelford, Michael Brewer, Steve McDowall, John Schuster, John Gallagher), only two of the announced players were still in the final squad to play the Lions, with many New Zealanders refusing to play for the team.

==== 1989 squad ====
Coaching team:

- Head coach: Bob Dwyer
- Assistant coach: Bob Templeton

Player	Position	Date of birth (age)	Caps	Club/province
Mark McBain	Hooker	30 October 1959 (aged 29)	7	(Australia) Queensland / Brothers
Steve McDowall	Prop	27 August 1961 (aged 27)	20	(New Zealand) Auckland
Andy McIntyre	Prop	23 December 1955 (aged 33)	37	(Australia) Queensland / University of Queensland
Steve Cutler	Lock	28 July 1960 (aged 28)	38	(Australia) New South Wales / Gordon
Bill Campbell	Lock	28 November 1961 (aged 27)	19	(Australia) Queensland / Wests
Simon Poidevin	Back row	31 October 1958 (aged 30)	50	(Australia) New South Wales / Randwick
Tim Gavin	Back row	20 November 1963 (aged 25)	4	(Australia) New South Wales / Eastern Suburbs
Jeff Miller	Back row	4 July 1962 (aged 27)	20	(Australia) Queensland / University of Queensland
Nick Farr-Jones	Scrum-half	18 April 1962 (aged 27)	35	(Australia) New South Wales / Sydney University
Michael Lynagh	Fly-half	25 October 1962 (aged 26)	11	(Australia) Queensland / University of Queensland
Frano Botica	Centre	3 August 1963 (aged 25)	7	(New Zealand) North Harbour
Dominic Maguire	Centre	2 July 1964 (aged 25)	3	(Australia) Queensland / Brothers
David Campese	Wing	21 October 1962 (aged 26)	45	(Australia) New South Wales / Randwick
Ian Williams	Fullback	23 September 1962 (aged 26)	10	(Australia) New South Wales / Eastwood
Kieran Crowley	Wing	31 August 1961 (aged 27)	9	(New Zealand) Taranaki

=== 2025 British & Irish Lions tour ===
In July 2023, following the announcement of the Lions' schedule for the 2025 tour, it was confirmed that a combined team would play against the Lions again. As France would be on a three-test tour of New Zealand at the same time as the Lions tour, ESPN wrote: "it is expected that All Blacks who are instead playing in Japanese rugby or elsewhere, and therefore not eligible for Test selection, will instead be targeted to join the invitational team." In March 2025, Rugby Australia (RA) announced that former New Zealand head coach (2020–2023) Ian Foster would be a part of the ANZAC XV coaching staff. In the following months (May 2025), the full coaching staff was announced, with Queensland Reds head coach Les Kiss leading the team, alongside his assistant Zane Hilton, aforementioned former New Zealand coach Ian Foster, and Western Force coach Simon Cron.

==== 2025 squad ====
On 1 July 2025, the first set of players selected were confirmed. The players' selection, all from New Zealand, came 8 days after New Zealand had selected their squad to face France in their international tour. New Zealand centre Ngani Laumape was later confirmed as an additional member of the squad. More players were revealed for selection days later, including flanker Pete Samu, hooker Brandon Paenga-Amosa, and winger Marika Koroibete.

The squad was confirmed on 7 July 2025, 5 days ahead of their match against the British & Irish Lions.

Coaching team:

- Head coach: Les Kiss
- Assistant coach: Ian Foster
- Assistant coach: Simon Cron
- Assistant coach: Zane Hilton

Player	Position	Date of birth (age)	Caps	Club/province
Richie Asiata	Hooker	3 May 1996 (aged 29)	0	(Australia) Queensland Reds
Kurt Eklund	Hooker	5 January 1992 (aged 33)	0	(New Zealand) Blues / Bay of Plenty
Brandon Paenga-Amosa	Hooker	25 December 1995 (aged 29)	20	(Australia) Western Force
Daniel Botha	Prop	16 December 2001 (aged 23)	0	(Australia) New South Wales Waratahs
George Dyer	Prop	22 October 1999 (aged 25)	0	(New Zealand) Chiefs / Waikato
Josh Fusitua	Prop	1 May 2001 (aged 24)	0	(New Zealand) Blues / Auckland
Aidan Ross	Prop	25 October 1995 (aged 29)	2	(Australia) Queensland Reds
Jeffery Toomaga-Allen (Note: Whilst Toomaga-Allen is a current Samoan international, he had previously played for New Zealand before changing international allegiance in 2022.)	Prop	19 November 1990 (aged 34)	1	(Australia) Queensland Reds
Angus Blyth	Lock	4 March 1998 (aged 27)	4	(Australia) Queensland Reds / Bond University
Lukhan Salakaia-Loto	Lock	19 September 1996 (aged 28)	41	(Australia) Queensland Reds
Matt Philip	Lock	7 March 1994 (aged 31)	31	(Australia) New South Wales Waratahs
Joe Brial	Back row	7 January 2002 (aged 23)	0	(Australia) Queensland Reds
Shannon Frizell	Back row	11 February 1994 (aged 31)	33	(Japan) Toshiba Brave Lupus Tokyo
Pete Samu	Back row	17 December 1991 (aged 33)	33	(France) Bordeaux Bègles
Hoskins Sotutu	Back row	12 July 1998 (aged 26)	14	(New Zealand) Blues / Counties Manukau
Seru Uru	Back row	3 January 1997 (aged 28)	2	(Australia) Queensland Reds
Folau Fakatava	Scrum-half	16 December 1999 (aged 25)	2	(New Zealand) Highlanders / Hawke's Bay
Kalani Thomas	Scrum-half	18 April 2002 (aged 23)	0	(Australia) Queensland Reds
Tane Edmed	Fly-half	16 August 2000 (aged 24)	1	(Australia) New South Wales Waratahs
Harry McLaughlin-Phillips	Fly-half	13 April 2004 (aged 21)	0	(Australia) Queensland Reds
David Havili	Centre	23 December 1994 (aged 30)	30	(New Zealand) Crusaders / Tasman
Ngani Laumape	Centre	22 April 1993 (aged 32)	15	(Japan) Kobelco Kobe Steelers
Joey Walton	Centre	27 May 2000 (aged 25)	0	(Australia) New South Wales Waratahs
Lachie Anderson	Wing	27 August 1997 (aged 27)	0	(Australia) Queensland Reds
Mac Grealy	Wing	6 March 2002 (aged 23)	0	(Australia) Western Force
Marika Koroibete	Wing	26 July 1992 (aged 32)	63	(Japan) Saitama Wild Knights
AJ Lam	Wing	29 July 1998 (aged 26)	0	(New Zealand) Blues / Auckland
Darby Lancaster	Wing	23 April 2003 (aged 22)	1	(Australia) New South Wales Waratahs
Jock Campbell	Fullback	17 May 1995 (aged 30)	4	(Australia) Queensland Reds
Shaun Stevenson	Fullback	14 November 1996 (aged 28)	1	(Japan) Kubota Spears

== Statistics ==
List of try-scorers
No.	Player	Tour	Position	Tries
1	Ian Williams	1989	Wing	1

List of point-scorers
No.	Player	Tour	Position	Points
1	Michael Lynagh	1989	Fly-half	11
