= Triston Reilly =

Australian rugby league & union player

- Born: 14 January 1999 (age 27) Kempsey, New South Wales, Australia
- Height: 183 cm (6 ft 0 in)
- Weight: 95 kg (209 lb; 14 st 13 lb)
- School: St Joseph's College, Hunters Hill

Rugby union career
- Position(s): Wing, Centre
- Current team: Brumbies
Senior career
Years	Team	Apps	(Points)
2019–2020	Sydney	5	(5)
2020–2022	Waratahs	6	(0)
2024–2026	Waratahs	34	(50)
2027–	Brumbies	0	(0)
- Correct as of 30 May 2026
International career
Years	Team	Apps	(Points)
2019	Australia U20	5	(15)
2025	First Nations & Pasifika XV	1	(5)
- Correct as of 17 July 2026
National sevens team
Years	Team		Comps
2018	Australia Sevens		4
Medal record
Men's rugby union
Representing Australia
Oceania U20 Championship
Winner	2019 Gold Coast
Junior World Cup
Runner-up	2019 Argentina

Triston Reilly (born 14 January 1999) is an Australian professional rugby league and rugby union player who most currently plays for the ACT Brumbies in the Super Rugby. In 2023, Reilly played rugby league for the Wests Tigers in the National Rugby League (NRL). His regular playing positions are centre and wing. He played for the New South Wales Waratahs previously and played for Randwick Rugby in the Shute Shield competition at club level.

== Career ==
=== Youth and sevens ===
Reilly made his debut just one year out of the rugby nursery of St Joseph's College, Hunters Hill. The 19-year-old impressed coach Tim Walsh in his second world series cap in London, scoring three tries in just two games, before getting injured before his remaining games. In 2017, Reilly played for the Australian Youth Rugby Sevens team who finished third in the World youth all schools tournament which was played in New Zealand, where he scored 5 tries.

Reilly made his debut for the Australian sevens team in April 2018.

=== Rugby League ===
==== 2022–2023 ====
In 2022, Reilly joined Western Suburbs in the NSW Cup. In round 25 of the 2023 NRL season, Reilly made his first grade debut for the Wests Tigers against the Dolphins. Reilly played two further games for the club as they finished the year with the Wooden Spoon. On 21 November, it was announced by the Wests Tigers that they had released Reilly after he was not offered a new contract.

=== Brumbies ===
In mid-July 2026, Reilly was one of several Waratahs-contracted players that were confirmed to have departed the club in the off-season. Reilly, who had two separate stints with the Waratahs, was reportedly close to signing for the ACT Brumbies in Canberra, a local rival of the Waratahs. On 16 July 2026, the ACT Brumbies confirmed they had signed Reilly on a two-year deal ahead of the 2027 season.

== Career statistics ==
=== Club ===
As of 17 July 2026.

Appearances and tries by club, season and competition
Club	Season	League			
Club	Season	Division	Apps	Tries	Points
Waratahs	2021	Super Rugby AU	2	0	0
Waratahs	2022	Super Rugby Pacific	4	0	0
Waratahs	2024	Super Rugby Pacific	10	1	5
Waratahs	2025	Super Rugby Pacific	12	7	35
Waratahs	2026	Super Rugby Pacific	12	2	10
Waratahs	Total		40	10	50
Brumbies	2027	Super Rugby Pacific	TBD		
Total			40	10	50
