= Seru Uru =

Fijian-born Australian rugby union player

- Born: Serupepeli Uru; 3 March 1997 (age 29) Lautoka, Fiji
- Height: 199 cm (6 ft 6 in)
- Weight: 115 kg (254 lb; 18 st 2 lb)

Rugby union career
- Position: Flanker
Senior career
Years	Team	Apps	(Points)
2019	Brisbane City	8	(10)
- Correct as of 4 November 2019
Super Rugby
Years	Team	Apps	(Points)
2020–	Reds	74	(55)
- Correct as of 6 June 2026
International career
Years	Team	Apps	(Points)
2021–2023	Australia A	5	(0)
2024–	Australia	2	(0)
2025	First Nations & Pasifika XV	1	(5)

Serupepeli Uru (born 3 January 1997) is a professional rugby union player who plays for the Queensland Reds in the Super Rugby. His playing position is flanker. Born in Fiji, Uru has represented Australia A and Australia, as well as the First Nations & Pasifika XV which was formed to play against the incoming British & Irish Lions team on their 2025 tour of Australia.

Uru attended the prestigious Ratu Kadavulevu School with whom he won the U18 Deans Trophy in 2015. He represented Fiji in Basketball and also Fiji under-20s in rugby which toured around Europe. He later came to Melbourne, Victoria and played club rugby for Power House Rugby Union and received best player in 2017 in Victoria. He later signed with Queensland Reds after the Melbourne Rebels failed to sign him. Since then, he has won many awards and is respected as amongst his team’s most gifted talents.
