= Lington Ieli =

Australian rugby union player

- Born: 22 June 2004 (age 22) Fiji
- Height: 183 cm (6 ft 0 in)
- Weight: 122 kg (269 lb; 19 st 3 lb)

Rugby union career
- Position: Prop
- Current team: Brumbies
Senior career
Years	Team	Apps	(Points)
2025–	Brumbies	8	(0)
- Correct as of 5 June 2026
International career
Years	Team	Apps	(Points)
2024	Australia U20	7	(5)
2025	First Nations & Pasifika XV	1	(0)
- Correct as of 16 February 2025

Lington Ieli (born 22 June 2004) is an Australian rugby union player, who plays for the Brumbies. His preferred position is prop.

== Early career ==
Ieli is from Fiji with Rotuman heritage and originally played youth rugby on the island before moving to Australia. Having come through the Brumbies academy and played his club rugby for Tuggeranong Vikings, he represented Australia U20 in 2024.

== Professional career ==
Ieli was named in the Brumbies squad ahead of Round 1 of the 2025 Super Rugby Pacific season, debuting as a replacement against the Drua.
