= 2020 Super Rugby season =

Men's rugby union club competition

- Countries: Argentina (1 team); Australia (4 teams); Japan (1 team); New Zealand (5 teams); South Africa (4 teams)
- Tournament format(s): Conference and knockout
- Matches played: 46
- Tries scored: 319 (6.93 per match)
- Top point scorer(s): Curwin Bosch, Sharks (86)
- Top try scorer(s): Andrew Kellaway, Rebels (7)
- Official website: Official site

The 2020 Super Rugby season was the 25th season of Super Rugby, the international men's rugby union competition organised by SANZAAR involving teams from Argentina, Australia, Japan, New Zealand and South Africa. It was the third tournament in its then-current fifteen-team format, and it was also its last. The Christchurch-based Crusaders were the defending champions, having won the previous three consecutive seasons back-to-back (2017, 2018, 2019).

On 14 March 2020, it was announced that the season would be suspended after the conclusion of round seven fixtures, due to the COVID-19 pandemic and a travel restriction that was announced by New Zealand earlier in the day. Replacement regional tournaments would take place thereafter, beginning in June in New Zealand, July in Australia and October in South Africa.

== Competition format ==
Fifteen teams were to partake in the 2020 edition of Super Rugby. They were split into three conferences: the Australian Conference (consisting of four Australian teams and the Japanese Sunwolves), the New Zealand Conference (consisting of five New Zealand teams), and the South African Conference (consisting of four South African teams and the Jaguares from Argentina).

The group stages were to consist of 18 rounds of matches spanning from 31 January 2020 until the beginning of June. Teams were to play 16 matches each across these 18 rounds with two bye weeks built into each of their schedules. Teams were to play each of their conference rivals home and away and then another eight matches against non-conference teams either home or away, but against a minimum of four of the teams in the other conferences.

The winner of each conference would qualify for the Super Rugby finals, along with the next five best teams from all the conferences. The winners of each conference and the best placed team were to host the quarterfinals. It was planned that winners of the quarterfinals would progress to the semifinals, and the winners of the semifinals to the final, but eventually all matches were cancelled (see below).

== COVID-19 pandemic ==
Due to the COVID-19 pandemic, two Sunwolves matches were moved to Australia from Japan. It was announced 12 March that although fans would still be admitted for that weekend's fixtures, future rounds held in Australia were to be played behind closed doors. On 14 March, New Zealand announced that all travellers entering the country from outside of the Pacific Islands would be required to self-isolate for 14 days on arrival. As this would have made play logistically difficult, SANZAAR announced that the season would be suspended indefinitely following the completion of the seventh round of fixtures.

Following the suspension, SANZAAR and regional rugby boards proposed regional tournaments to replace the Super Rugby fixtures that were cancelled. On 6 May, New Zealand Rugby announced that a Super Rugby Aotearoa competition, involving the five New Zealand teams, would begin on 13 June. The competition will be contested using a double round robin format, with 20 matches played over 10 weeks. On 27 May, Rugby Australia confirmed Super Rugby AU would begin on 3 July, involving the four Australian sides in the Australian conference and the Western Force, who played in Super Rugby until the 2017 season. The Sunwolves were also in discussions to take part in the Australian competition, but due to travel restrictions were unable to do so. Following this, the club was disbanded on 1 June, with the side having been due to leave Super Rugby at the end of the original 2020 season.

On 16 September, SA Rugby announced a 7 team competition between the four South African Super Rugby sides, plus the Cheetahs from Pro14, and the Griquas and Pumas from the Currie Cup, starting on 10 October. On 18 September, the official details of the Super Rugby Unlocked tournament was announced, with the 7 teams playing each other in a round robin format over the course of 7 weeks, with the domestic Currie Cup competition continuing thereafter.

== Standings ==
=== Conference standings ===
Australian conference
Pos	Team	Pts
1	Brumbies	23
2	Rebels	13
3	Reds	13
4	Waratahs	5
5	Sunwolves	4

New Zealand conference
Pos	Team	Pts
1	Crusaders	23
2	Blues	22
3	Chiefs	19
4	Hurricanes	17
5	Highlanders	7

South African conference
Pos	Team	Pts
1	Sharks	24
2	Stormers	17
3	Jaguares	17
4	Bulls	6
5	Lions	5

=== Overall standings ===
2020 Super Rugby standings
Pos	Team	Pld	W	D	L	PF	PA	PD	TF	TA	TB	LB	Pts	Qualification
1	Sharks	7	6	0	1	213	153	+60	25	19	0	0	24	Quarter-finals (Conference leaders)
2	Brumbies	6	5	0	1	208	115	+93	31	15	2	1	23	Quarter-finals (Conference leaders)
3	Crusaders	6	5	0	1	189	105	+84	26	15	3	0	23	Quarter-finals (Conference leaders)
4	Blues	7	5	0	2	192	134	+58	25	17	2	0	22	Quarter-finals (Wildcard)
5	Chiefs	6	4	0	2	194	128	+66	27	18	2	1	19	Quarter-finals (Wildcard)
6	Hurricanes	6	4	0	2	168	135	+33	22	17	1	0	17	Quarter-finals (Wildcard)
7	Stormers	6	4	0	2	118	94	+24	16	10	1	0	17	Quarter-finals (Wildcard)
8	Jaguares	7	3	1	3	169	135	+34	23	16	2	1	17	Quarter-finals (Wildcard)
9	Rebels	6	3	0	3	166	160	+6	23	22	1	0	13	
10	Reds	7	2	0	5	219	176	+43	32	25	2	3	13	
11	Highlanders	6	1	1	4	91	163	−72	11	23	0	1	7	
12	Bulls	6	1	0	5	115	152	−37	14	20	1	1	6	
13	Lions	6	1	0	5	109	200	−91	14	27	0	1	5	
14	Waratahs	6	1	0	5	104	214	−110	15	31	1	0	5	
15	Sunwolves	6	1	0	5	101	292	−191	15	45	0	0	4	

Updated to match(es) played on 15 March 2020. Source: Super Rugby

=== Round-by-round ===
The table below shows each team's progression throughout the season. For each round, their cumulative points total is shown with the overall log position in brackets:

Team Progression – Australian Conference
Team	R1	R2	R3	R4	R5	R6	R7	R8	R9	R10	R11	R12	R13	R14	R15	R16	R17	R18	QF	SF	Final
Brumbies	4 (7th)	8 (3rd)	9 (3rd)	13 (3rd)	13 (3rd)	18 (3rd)	23 (2nd)	23 (2nd)	23 (2nd)	23 (2nd)	23 (2nd)	23 (2nd)	23 (2nd)	23 (2nd)	23 (2nd)	23 (2nd)	23 (2nd)	23 (2nd)	N/A	N/A	N/A
Rebels	0 (12th)	0 (13th)	4 (10th)	4 (11th)	8 (9th)	13 (9th)	13 (9th)	13 (9th)	13 (9th)	13 (9th)	13 (9th)	13 (9th)	13 (9th)	13 (9th)	13 (9th)	13 (9th)	13 (9th)	13 (9th)	N/A	N/A	N/A
Reds	1 (8th)	2 (11th)	2 (13th)	7 (9th)	7 (10th)	8 (10th)	13 (10th)	13 (10th)	13 (10th)	13 (10th)	13 (10th)	13 (10th)	13 (10th)	13 (10th)	13 (10th)	13 (10th)	13 (10th)	13 (10th)	N/A	N/A	N/A
Sunwolves	4 (3rd)	4 (8th)	4 (11th)	4 (13th)	4 (14th)	4 (15th)	4 (15th)	4 (15th)	4 (15th)	4 (15th)	4 (15th)	4 (15th)	4 (15th)	4 (15th)	4 (15th)	4 (15th)	4 (15th)	4 (15th)	N/A	N/A	N/A
Waratahs	0 (13th)	0 (15th)	0 (15th)	0 (15th)	5 (12th)	5 (14th)	5 (14th)	5 (14th)	5 (14th)	5 (14th)	5 (14th)	5 (14th)	5 (14th)	5 (14th)	5 (14th)	5 (14th)	5 (14th)	5 (14th)	N/A	N/A	N/A
Team Progression – New Zealand Conference
Team	R1	R2	R3	R4	R5	R6	R7	R8	R9	R10	R11	R12	R13	R14	R15	R16	R17	R18	QF	SF	Final
Blues	0 (10th)	5 (6th)	5 (8th)	9 (7th)	13 (8th)	17 (6th)	22 (4th)	22 (4th)	22 (4th)	22 (4th)	22 (4th)	22 (4th)	22 (4th)	22 (4th)	22 (4th)	22 (4th)	22 (4th)	22 (4th)	N/A	N/A	N/A
Chiefs	4 (6th)	8 (2nd)	13 (1st)	13 (4th)	13 (7th)	18 (2nd)	19 (5th)	19 (5th)	19 (5th)	19 (5th)	19 (5th)	19 (5th)	19 (5th)	19 (5th)	19 (5th)	19 (5th)	19 (5th)	19 (5th)	N/A	N/A	N/A
Crusaders	5 (2nd)	5 (7th)	9 (5th)	14 (2nd)	14 (2nd)	18 (4th)	23 (3rd)	23 (3rd)	23 (3rd)	23 (3rd)	23 (3rd)	23 (3rd)	23 (3rd)	23 (3rd)	23 (3rd)	23 (3rd)	23 (3rd)	23 (3rd)	N/A	N/A	N/A
Highlanders	0 (9th)	0 (14th)	4 (12th)	4 (12th)	5 (13th)	5 (13th)	7 (11th)	7 (11th)	7 (11th)	7 (11th)	7 (11th)	7 (11th)	7 (11th)	7 (11th)	7 (11th)	7 (11th)	7 (11th)	7 (11th)	N/A	N/A	N/A
Hurricanes	0 (14th)	4 (10th)	8 (7th)	8 (8th)	13 (6th)	13 (8th)	17 (6th)	17 (6th)	17 (6th)	17 (6th)	17 (6th)	17 (6th)	17 (6th)	17 (6th)	17 (6th)	17 (6th)	17 (6th)	17 (6th)	N/A	N/A	N/A
Team Progression – South African Conference
Team	R1	R2	R3	R4	R5	R6	R7	R8	R9	R10	R11	R12	R13	R14	R15	R16	R17	R18	QF	SF	Final
Bulls	0 (11th)	0 (12th)	0 (14th)	1 (14th)	1 (15th)	6 (11th)	6 (12th)	6 (12th)	6 (12th)	6 (12th)	6 (12th)	6 (12th)	6 (12th)	6 (12th)	6 (12th)	6 (12th)	6 (12th)	6 (12th)	N/A	N/A	N/A
Jaguares	5 (1st)	6 (5th)	10 (4th)	10 (6th)	15 (5th)	15 (7th)	17 (8th)	17 (8th)	17 (8th)	17 (8th)	17 (8th)	17 (8th)	17 (8th)	17 (8th)	17 (8th)	17 (8th)	17 (8th)	17 (8th)	N/A	N/A	N/A
Lions	0 (15th)	4 (9th)	5 (9th)	5 (10th)	5 (11th)	5 (12th)	5 (13th)	5 (13th)	5 (13th)	5 (13th)	5 (13th)	5 (13th)	5 (13th)	5 (13th)	5 (13th)	5 (13th)	5 (13th)	5 (13th)	N/A	N/A	N/A
Sharks	4 (5th)	8 (4th)	8 (6th)	12 (5th)	16 (4th)	20 (1st)	24 (1st)	24 (1st)	24 (1st)	24 (1st)	24 (1st)	24 (1st)	24 (1st)	24 (1st)	24 (1st)	24 (1st)	24 (1st)	24 (1st)	N/A	N/A	N/A
Stormers	5 (4th)	9 (1st)	13 (2nd)	17 (1st)	17 (1st)	17 (5th)	17 (7th)	17 (7th)	17 (7th)	17 (7th)	17 (7th)	17 (7th)	17 (7th)	17 (7th)	17 (7th)	17 (7th)	17 (7th)	17 (7th)	N/A	N/A	N/A
Key:	Win	Draw	Loss	Bye	Cancelled	Postponed															

== Matches ==
The fixtures for the 2020 Super Rugby competition were released on 10 September 2019.

Home \ Away	BLU	BRU	BUL	CHI	CRU	HIG	HUR	JAG	LIO	REB	RED	SHA	STO	SUN	WAR
Blues	—	Cancelled	—	29–37	8–25	Cancelled	Cancelled	Cancelled	43–10	—	Cancelled	—	—	—	—
Brumbies	—	—	—	—	—	22–23	Cancelled	Cancelled	—	39–26	27–24	—	Cancelled	47–14	47–14
Bulls	21–23	Cancelled	—	—	—	38–13	—	24–39	Cancelled	—	—	Cancelled	Cancelled	Cancelled	—
Chiefs	Cancelled	14–26	Cancelled	—	25–15	Cancelled	24–27	—	—	Cancelled	—	—	Cancelled	—	—
Crusaders	Cancelled	—	—	Cancelled	—	33–13	Cancelled	Cancelled	—	—	24–20	—	Cancelled	49–14	43–25
Highlanders	Cancelled	—	—	Cancelled	Cancelled	—	Cancelled	—	Cancelled	22–28	—	20–42	—	Cancelled	—
Hurricanes	15–24	—	Cancelled	Cancelled	Cancelled	Cancelled	—	—	—	—	—	38–22	—	62–15	Cancelled
Jaguares	—	—	Cancelled	—	—	0–0 can.	23–26	—	38–8	Cancelled	43–27	Cancelled	Cancelled	—	—
Lions	—	—	Cancelled	Cancelled	Cancelled	—	—	Cancelled	—	—	27–20	Cancelled	30–33	Cancelled	—
Rebels	Cancelled	Cancelled	—	—	Cancelled	—	—	—	37–17	—	Cancelled	24–36	—	Cancelled	24–10
Reds	—	Cancelled	41–17	—	—	Cancelled	Cancelled	—	—	Cancelled	—	23–33	—	64–5	Cancelled
Sharks	—	Cancelled	23–15	Cancelled	Cancelled	—	—	33–19	Cancelled	—	—	—	24–14	—	Cancelled
Stormers	14–33	—	13–0	—	—	—	27–0	17–7	Cancelled	Cancelled	—	Cancelled	—	—	Cancelled
Sunwolves	—	Cancelled	—	17–43	—	—	—	Cancelled	—	36–27	Cancelled	—	Cancelled	—	Cancelled
Waratahs	12–32	Cancelled	Cancelled	14–51	—	—	—	—	29–17	Cancelled	Cancelled	—	—	Cancelled	—

First match(es) will be played: 31 January 2020. Source: https://sanzarrugby.com/superrugby/fixtures/
Legend: Blue = home team win; Yellow = draw; Red = away team win.

== Players ==
=== Squads ===
The following 2020 Super Rugby squads have been named:

Blues squad
Forwards	Aaron Carroll • Gerard Cowley-Tuioti • Kurt Eklund • Blake Gibson • Josh Goodhue • Alex Hodgman • Akira Ioane • Tony Lamborn • Ezekiel Lindenmuth • Sione Mafileo • Ray Niuia • Dalton Papalii • James Parsons • Jacob Pierce • Marcel Renata • Tom Robinson • Hoskins Sotutu • Luteru Tolai • Karl Tu'inukuafe • Patrick Tuipulotu • Ofa Tu'ungafasi • Joe Walsh • Did not play • Sam Caird • Waimana Riedlinger-Kapa • James Tucker
Backs	Otere Black • Matt Duffie • TJ Faiane • Jordan Hyland • Rieko Ioane • Joe Marchant • Emoni Narawa • Sam Nock • Stephen Perofeta • Harry Plummer • Jonathan Ruru • Mark Tele'a • Did not play • Beauden Barrett • Finlay Christie • Caleb Clarke • Jack Heighton • Jared Page • Tanielu Teleʻa
Coach	Leon MacDonald

Brumbies squad
Forwards	Allan Alaalatoa • Tom Cusack • Murray Douglas • Folau Fainga'a • Nick Frost • Harry Lloyd • Lachlan Lonergan • Lachlan McCaffrey • Connal McInerney • Will Miller • Cadeyrn Neville • Tom Ross • Pete Samu • Scott Sio • James Slipper • Darcy Swain • Rob Valetini • Did not play • Jahrome Brown • Blake Enever • Shambeckler Vui
Backs	Tom Banks • Len Ikitau • Solomone Kata • Bayley Kuenzle • Tevita Kuridrani • Noah Lolesio • Ryan Lonergan • Andy Muirhead • Reesjan Pasitoa • Joe Powell • Toni Pulu • Irae Simone • Tom Wright • Did not play • Issak Fines • Mack Hansen • Guy Porter
Coach	Dan McKellar

Bulls squad
Forwards	Corniel Els • Andries Ferreira • Lizo Gqoboka • Johan Grobbelaar • Ian Groenewald • Wiehahn Herbst • Juandré Kruger • Simphiwe Matanzima • Abongile Nonkontwana • Ruan Nortjé • Trevor Nyakane • Ryno Pieterse • Jeandré Rudolph • Gerhard Steenekamp • Ruan Steenkamp • Josh Strauss • Muller Uys • Marco van Staden • Jaco Visagie • Wian Vosloo • Did not play • Tim Agaba • Dayan van der Westhuizen • Louis van der Westhuizen
Backs	Warrick Gelant • Cornal Hendricks • Marco Jansen van Vuren • Johnny Kôtze • Manie Libbok • Burger Odendaal • Embrose Papier • Divan Rossouw • Rosko Specman • Morné Steyn • Nafi Tuitavake • Ivan van Zyl • Did not play • Richard Kriel • Franco Naudé • Marnus Potgieter • Dylan Sage • Chris Smith • Jade Stighling
Coach	Pote Human

Chiefs squad
Forwards	Naitoa Ah Kuoi • Michael Allardice • Tyler Ardron • Lachlan Boshier • Mitchell Brown • Sam Cane • Ryan Coxon • Ross Geldenhuys • Luke Jacobson • Mitchell Karpik • Nepo Laulala • Donald Maka • Atu Moli • Dylan Nel • Ollie Norris • Reuben O'Neill • Aidan Ross • Bradley Slater • Pita Gus Sowakula • Angus Ta'avao • Samisoni Taukei'aho • Adam Thomson • Did not play • Rob Cobb • Laghlan McWhannell • James Thompson • Tupou Vaa'i
Backs	Solomon Alaimalo • Aaron Cruden • Tiaan Falcon • Orbyn Leger • Anton Lienert-Brown • Tumua Manu • Damian McKenzie • Sam McNicol • Lisati Milo-Harris • Alex Nankivell • Shaun Stevenson • Te Toiroa Tahuriorangi • Kaleb Trask • Quinn Tupaea • Sean Wainui • Brad Weber • Did not play • Leroy Carter • Kini Naholo • Etene Nanai-Seturo • Bailyn Sullivan
Coach	Warren Gatland

Crusaders squad
Forwards	Michael Alaalatoa • Scott Barrett • George Bower • Tom Christie • Whetu Douglas • Mitchell Dunshea • Cullen Grace • Sione Havili • Oliver Jager • Andrew Makalio • Brodie McAlister • Joe Moody • Hugh Roach • Luke Romano • Ethan Roots • Tom Sanders • Codie Taylor • Matt Todd • Isi Tu'ungafasi • Did not play • Harry Allan • Ethan Blackadder • Billy Harmon • Quinten Strange
Backs	George Bridge • Fergus Burke • Brett Cameron • Mitchell Drummond • Ere Enari • Braydon Ennor • Leicester Fainga'anuku • Jack Goodhue • Bryn Hall • David Havili • Will Jordan • Manasa Mataele • Dallas McLeod • Richie Mo'unga • Sevu Reece • Did not play • Inga Finau • Fetuli Paea
Coach	Scott Robertson

Highlanders squad
Forwards	Teariki Ben-Nicholas • Liam Coltman • Josh Dickson • Ash Dixon • Shannon Frizell • Jackson Hemopo • Dillon Hunt • Josh Iosefa-Scott • Ayden Johnstone • James Lentjes • Daniel Lienert-Brown • Marino Mikaele-Tu'u • Conán O'Donnell • Jesse Parete • Pari Pari Parkinson • Manaaki Selby-Rickit • Jeff Thwaites • Siate Tokolahi • Jack Whetton • Did not play • Ethan de Groot • Zane Kapeli • Slade McDowall • Sione Misiloi • Will Tucker • Nathan Vella
Backs	Michael Collins • Tima Fainga'anuku • Scott Gregory • Kayne Hammington • Mitchell Hunt • Josh Ioane • Kirisi Kuridrani • Josh McKay • Jona Nareki • Ngane Punivai • Aaron Smith • Rob Thompson • Sio Tomkinson • Teihorangi Walden • Did not play • Folau Fakatava • Bryn Gatland • Tevita Nabura • Thomas Umaga-Jensen
Coach	Aaron Mauger

Hurricanes squad
Forwards	Fraser Armstrong • Asafo Aumua • James Blackwell • Dane Coles • Gareth Evans • Alex Fidow • Vaea Fifita • Devan Flanders • Du'Plessis Kirifi • Tyrel Lomax • Tevita Mafileo • Ben May • Liam Mitchell • Xavier Numia • Reed Prinsep • Pouri Rakete-Stones • Ricky Riccitelli • Scott Scrafton • Isaia Walker-Leawere • Did not play • Kane Le'aupepe • Ardie Savea • Murphy Taramai
Backs	Vince Aso • Jordie Barrett • Jamie Booth • Jackson Garden-Bachop • Wes Goosen • Ben Lam • Ngani Laumape • James Marshall • TJ Perenara • Billy Proctor • Fletcher Smith • Jonathan Taumateine • Chase Tiatia • Peter Umaga-Jensen • Kobus van Wyk • Did not play • Jonah Lowe • Danny Toala
Coach	Jason Holland

Jaguares squad
Forwards	Matías Alemanno • Rodrigo Bruni • Agustín Creevy • Javier Díaz • Francisco Gorrissen • Santiago Grondona • Marcos Kremer • Tomás Lezana • Santiago Medrano • Julián Montoya • Javier Ortega Desio • Lucas Paulos • Juan Bautista Pedemonte • Guido Petti • Joel Sclavi • Santiago Socino • Lucio Sordoni • Nahuel Tetaz Chaparro • Mayco Vivas • Did not play • Ignacio Calas • Santiago Montagner • Juan Pablo Zeiss
Backs	Tomás Albornoz • Gonzalo Bertranou • Emiliano Boffelli • Sebastián Cancelliere • Santiago Carreras • Santiago Chocobares • Tomás Cubelli • Jerónimo de la Fuente • Bautista Delguy • Joaquín Díaz Bonilla • Felipe Ezcurra • Juan Cruz Mallía • Domingo Miotti • Matías Moroni • Matías Orlando • Joaquín Tuculet • Did not play • Mateo Carreras • Juan Pablo Castro • Lucas Mensa
Coach	Gonzalo Quesada

Lions squad
Forwards	Willem Alberts • Jan-Henning Campher • Hacjivah Dayimani • Jannie du Plessis • Pieter Jansen • Len Massyn • Marvin Orie • Carlü Sadie • Marnus Schoeman • Ruben Schoeman • Sti Sithole • Dylan Smith • Vincent Tshituka • Wilhelm van der Sluys • Frans van Wyk • Ruan Vermaak • Did not play • Cyle Brink • Rhyno Herbst • Marko Janse van Rensburg • Johannes Jonker • Jaco Kriel • Nathan McBeth • Reinhard Nothnagel • Asenathi Ntlabakanye • Roelof Smit
Backs	Andries Coetzee • Tyrone Green • Elton Jantjies • Dan Kriel • Duncan Matthews • Mannie Rass • Shaun Reynolds • Wandisile Simelane • Courtnall Skosan • Dillon Smit • Tiaan Swanepoel • Jamba Ulengo • Morné van den Berg • André Warner • Did not play • Ross Cronjé • Gianni Lombard • James Mollentze • Stean Pienaar • Louritz van der Schyff
Coach	Ivan van Rooyen

Rebels squad
Forwards	Jermaine Ainsley • Angus Cottrell • Cabous Eloff • Matt Gibbon • Richard Hardwick • Ross Haylett-Petty • Luke Jones • Gideon Koegelenberg • Rob Leota • Steven Misa • Isi Naisarani • Cameron Orr • Matt Philip • Anaru Rangi • Fereti Sa'aga • Ruan Smith • Jordan Uelese • Michael Wells • Did not play • Mees Erasmus • Pone Fa'amausili • Esei Ha'angana • Trevor Hosea • Josh Kemeny • Boyd Killingworth • Declan Moore • Brad Wilkin
Backs	Andrew Deegan • Tom English • Dane Haylett-Petty • Reece Hodge • Andrew Kellaway • Marika Koroibete • Frank Lomani • Ryan Louwrens • Campbell Magnay • Bill Meakes • Theo Strang • Matt To'omua • Did not play • Tom Pincus • Harry Potter • Semisi Tupou • James Tuttle
Coach	David Wessels

Reds squad
Forwards	Angus Blyth • Ed Craig • Feao Fotuaika • Harry Hockings • Harry Hoopert • Alex Mafi • Fraser McReight • Josh Nasser • Brandon Paenga-Amosa • Izack Rodda • Lukhan Salakaia-Loto • Angus Scott-Young • JP Smith • Taniela Tupou • Seru Uru • Harry Wilson • Liam Wright • Dane Zander • Did not play • Sean Farrell • David Feao • Jack Straker • Tuaina Taii Tualima • Michael Wood • Tom Kibble
Backs	Jock Campbell • Filipo Daugunu • Chris Feauai-Sautia • Bryce Hegarty • Isaac Lucas • Scott Malolua • Tate McDermott • James O'Connor • Hunter Paisami • Jordan Petaia • Henry Speight • Moses Sorovi • Hamish Stewart • Did not play • Carter Gordon • Jack Hardy
Coach	Brad Thorn

Sharks squad
Forwards	Hyron Andrews • Craig Burden • Phepsi Buthelezi • Thomas du Toit • Mzamo Majola • John-Hubert Meyer • Ox Nché • Sikhumbuzo Notshe • Tyler Paul • Dylan Richardson • Le Roux Roets • Juan Schoeman • Ruben van Heerden • Kerron van Vuuren • Henco Venter • James Venter • Did not play • Celimpilo Gumede • Michael Kumbirai • Fez Mbatha • Khutha Mchunu • Tera Mtembu • Andisa Ntsila • Evan Roos • Jordan Sesink-Clee • JJ van der Mescht • Emile van Heerden
Backs	Lukhanyo Am • Curwin Bosch • Boeta Chamberlain • André Esterhuizen • Aphelele Fassi • Marius Louw • Makazole Mapimpi • Lwazi Mvovo • Sbu Nkosi • Sanele Nohamba • Louis Schreuder • Madosh Tambwe • Jeremy Ward • Did not play • Taakhir Abrahams • Jodan Chait • Jaden Hendrikse • Murray Koster • JP Pietersen • Grant Williams • Cameron Wright
Coach	Sean Everitt

Stormers squad
Forwards	Juarno Augustus • Kwenzo Blose • Jaco Coetzee • Johan du Toit • Pieter-Steph du Toit • Steven Kitshoff • Siya Kolisi • Wilco Louw • Frans Malherbe • Bongi Mbonambi • David Meihuizen • Salmaan Moerat • Scarra Ntubeni • JD Schickerling • Chad Solomon • Ernst van Rhyn • Chris van Zyl • Ali Vermaak • Cobus Wiese • Did not play • Ben-Jason Dixon • Schalk Erasmus • Neethling Fouché • Dan Jooste • Leon Lyons • Sazi Sandi • Nama Xaba
Backs	Paul de Wet • Jean-Luc du Plessis • Herschel Jantjies • Dillyn Leyds • Godlen Masimla • Ruhan Nel • Sergeal Petersen • Rikus Pretorius • Jamie Roberts • Seabelo Senatla • Damian Willemse • Did not play • Dan du Plessis • Michal Haznar • Lyle Hendricks • David Kriel • Matt More • Edwill van der Merwe • Abner van Reenen • Leolin Zas
Coach	John Dobson

Sunwolves squad
Forwards	Jarred Adams • Leni Apisai • Jaba Bregvadze • Justin Downey • Chris Eves • Ben Hyne • Mitch Jacobson • Efi Ma'afu • Nic Mayhew • Shunsuke Nunomaki • Brendon O'Connor • Jake Schatz • Michael Stolberg • Corey Thomas • Tevita Tupou • Conraad van Vuuren • Hencus van Wyk • Kotaro Yatabe • Kyo Yoshida • Did not play • Chang Ho Ahn • Sione Asi • Kaku Bunkei • Mamoru Harada • Ryuga Hashimoto • Onehunga Havili • Mateaki Kafatolu • Asiperli Moala • Tom Rowe • Yuichiro Taniguchi
Backs	Garth April • James Dargaville • JJ Engelbrecht • Siosaia Fifita • Alex Horan • Jordan Jackson-Hope • Takahiro Kimura • Keisuke Moriya • Shogo Nakano • Jumpei Ogura • Rudy Paige • Naoto Saito • Yoshizumi Takeda • Tautalatasi Tasi • Ben Te'o • Did not play • Kenta Fukuda • Burua Inoke • Hiroki Kumoyama • Ben Lucas
Coach	Naoya Okubo

Waratahs squad
Forwards	Robbie Abel • Angus Bell • Jack Dempsey • Tetera Faulkner • Damien Fitzpatrick • Jed Holloway • Michael Hooper • Harry Johnson-Holmes • Ryan McCauley • Rory O'Connor • Tom Robertson • Rob Simmons • Tom Staniforth • Lachlan Swinton • Pat Tafa • Chris Talakai • Carlo Tizzano • Andrew Tuala • Did not play • Charlie Abel • Darcy Breen • Joe Cotton • Max Douglas • Charlie Gamble • Ned Hanigan • Will Harris • Tom Horton • Hugh Sinclair • Tiaan Tauakipulu • Jeremy Williams
Backs	Kurtley Beale • Cam Clark • Lalakai Foketi • Jake Gordon • Will Harrison • Karmichael Hunt • Siosifa Lisala • Jack Maddocks • Michael McDonald • Tepai Moeroa • Mark Nawaqanitawase • Alex Newsome • James Ramm • Mitch Short • Did not play • Ben Donaldson • Mack Mason • Triston Reilly • Henry Robertson • Jack Walsh • Joey Walton
Coach	Rob Penney

=== Top scorers ===
The top ten try and point scorers during the 2020 Super Rugby season are:

Top ten try scorers
No	Player	Team	Tries
1	(Australia) Andrew Kellaway	Rebels	7
2	(New Zealand) Mark Tele'a	Blues	5
2	(Australia) Tate McDermott	Reds	5
2	(Australia) Folau Fainga'a	Brumbies	5
2	(New Zealand) Ben Lam	Hurricanes	5
2	(South Africa) Makazole Mapimpi	Sharks	5
2	(Tonga) Solomone Kata	Brumbies	5
8	7 players		4

Top ten points scorers
No	Player	Team	Points
1	(South Africa) Curwin Bosch	Sharks	86
2	(Argentina) Domingo Miotti	Jaguares	46
3	(South Africa) Elton Jantjies	Lions	42
3	(New Zealand) Otere Black	Blues	42
3	(New Zealand) Jordie Barrett	Hurricanes	42
6	(South Africa) Damian Willemse	Stormers	41
7	(South Africa) Morné Steyn	Bulls	40
8	(New Zealand) Aaron Cruden	Chiefs	39
9	(Australia) Bryce Hegarty	Reds	37
10	(New Zealand) Josh Ioane	Highlanders	36
10	(Australia) Matt To'omua	Rebels	36

== Referees ==
The following refereeing panel was appointed by SANZAAR for the 2020 Super Rugby season:

2020 Super Rugby referees
Argentina	Federico Anselmi
Australia	Nic Berry • Angus Gardner • Damon Murphy
New Zealand	Mike Fraser • Ben O'Keeffe • Brendon Pickerill • Paul Williams
South Africa	AJ Jacobs • Jaco Peyper • Rasta Rasivhenge • Marius van der Westhuizen
