= 2020 Super Rugby AU season =

Men's rugby union club competition

- Countries: Australia
- Tournament format(s): Round-robin and knockout (Note: Total attendance and average attendance figures include a match without spectators due to the COVID-19 pandemic restrictions and a round 2 match in which an attendance figure was not reported.)
- Champions: Brumbies
- Matches played: 22
- Attendance: 65,104 (2,959 per match)
- Tries scored: 125 (5.68 per match)
- Top point scorer(s): James O'Connor, Reds (102)
- Top try scorer(s): Filipo Daugunu, Reds (6)
- Official website: Official site

The 2020 Super Rugby AU season, branded as Vodafone Super Rugby AU, was the inaugural season of Super Rugby AU, a professional Australian rugby union competition organised by Rugby Australia (RA). The tournament replaced the Australian component of the incomplete 2020 Super Rugby season that was shut down in March of that year due to the COVID-19 pandemic. It featured the four teams from the 2020 Australian conference, with the addition of former Super Rugby franchise the Western Force. The season ran from 3 July to 19 September 2020.

The Brumbies won the inaugural title, defeating the Reds 28–23 in the Grand Final at Canberra Stadium.

== Law adaptions ==
On 12 June, Rugby Australia announced seven law trials designed to make the game more entertaining for the fans and players. The trials were adapted from the 10 optional law trials available for unions and competitions given by World Rugby in May 2020. The following trials were used during the competition:

Law trials	Scenario
Goal line drop-out	When an attacking player carrying the ball is held up in the in-goal or knocks the ball on play restarts with a goal line drop-out.
Goal line drop-out	When a kick enters the in-goal area and is forced by the defending team play restarts with a goal line drop-out
Mark	A kick originating in the attacking 22m area cannot be marked by the defending team within their own 22m area. The kick can however be marked within the defending team's in-goal area and play restarts with a 22m line drop-out.
Red card change	A red carded player can be replaced after 20 minutes, unless all substitutions have been used.
50/22	A kick taken from within the defending team's 50m area that travels into touch within the opposition's 22m area having first bounced in the field of play results in a line-out throw to the kicking team. This does not apply following a free-kick.
22/50	A kick taken from within the defending team's 22m area that travels into touch within the opposition's 50m area having first bounced in the field of play results in a line-out throw to the kicking team. This does not apply following a free-kick.
Super Time	2 x 5min periods of extra time; in the event of a drawn game after regulation time where the first points scored wins the match for the scoring team

== Regular season ==
=== Standings ===
Pos	Team	Pld	W	D	L	PF	PA	PD	TF	TA	TB	LB	Pts	Qualification
1	Brumbies	8	6	0	2	189	147	+42	30	16	4	0	28	Grand Final
2	Reds	8	5	1	2	215	150	+65	28	19	2	1	25	Qualifying final
3	Rebels	8	4	1	3	194	178	+16	21	24	0	1	19	Qualifying final
4	Waratahs	8	4	0	4	204	189	+15	22	24	1	2	19	
5	Force	8	0	0	8	115	253	−138	15	33	0	3	3	

Source: Super Rugby

=== Round-by-round ===
The table below shows each team's progression throughout the season. For each round, their cumulative points total is shown with the overall log position in brackets:

Team progression
Team	1	2	3	4	5	6	7	8	9	10	QF	GF
Brumbies	5 (1st)	Bye (2nd)	9 (2nd)	14 (1st)	18 (1st)	18 (1st)	Bye (1st)	23 (1st)	28 (1st)	28 (1st)	Bye	Won
Force	Bye (4th)	0 (5th)	1 (5th)	1 (5th)	2 (5th)	Bye (5th)	2 (5th)	2 (5th)	2 (5th)	3 (5th)	DNQ	DNQ
Rebels	0 (5th)	2 (4th)	Bye (4th)	6 (3rd)	10 (3rd)	14 (2nd)	14 (4th)	Bye (4th)	15 (4th)	19 (3rd)	Lost	DNQ
Reds	4 (2nd)	6 (1st)	10 (1st)	Bye (2nd)	11 (2nd)	11 (4th)	16 (2nd)	21 (2nd)	Bye (2nd)	25 (2nd)	Won	Lost
Waratahs	1 (3rd)	5 (3rd)	6 (3rd)	6 (4th)	Bye (4th)	11 (3rd)	15 (3rd)	15 (3rd)	19 (3rd)	Bye (4th)	DNQ	DNQ
Key:	Win	Draw	Loss	Bye	DNQ = Did not qualify							

=== Match grid ===
Home \ Away	BRU	FOR	REB	RED	WAR
Brumbies	—	31–14	31–23	22–20	38–11
Force	0–24	—	20–25	5–57	8–28
Rebels	30–12	34–30	—	18–18	32–38
Reds	26–7	31–24	19–3	—	32–26
Waratahs	23–24	23–14	10–29	45–12	—

Source: Super Rugby
Legend: Blue = home team win; Yellow = draw; Red = away team win.

== Matches ==
=== Round 1 ===
3 July 2020
19:05 AEST (UTC+10)

Reds	32–26	Waratahs (1 BP)
Try: Wright 6'; Daugunu 18'; McDermott 29'; Wilson 64'; Con: Hegarty (3/4) 7', 30', 65'; Pen: O'Connor (2/2) 76', 80+1'; Cards: Tupou (yellow card) 67'	Report	Try: Johnson-Holmes 10'; Maddocks 48'; Con: Harrison (2/2) 11', 49'; Pen: Harrison (4/4) 34', 40', 43', 68'; Cards: Bell (yellow card) 29'

Lang Park, Brisbane
Attendance: 5,590
Referee: Nic Berry (Queensland)

4 July 2020
19:15 AEST (UTC+10)

(1 BP) Brumbies	31–23	Rebels
Try: Muirhead 3'; Powell 27'; Fainga'a 37'; Wright 44'; Miller 77'; Con: Lolesio (3/5) 5', 39', 79'	Report	Try: Uelese 58'; D. Haylett-Petty 63'; Con: To'omua (2/2) 59', 65'; Pen: To'omua (3/4) 9', 24', 71'

Canberra Stadium, Canberra
Attendance: 1,460
Referee: Angus Gardner (New South Wales)

Bye/s: Force

=== Round 2 ===
10 July 2020
19:05 AEST (UTC+10)

Rebels	18–18 (a.e.t.)	Reds
Try: Hodge 54'; Meakes 68'; Con: To'omua (1/2) 69'; Pen: To'omua (2/2) 7', 40+2'	Report	Try: Daugunu 44'; Mafi 79'; Con: O'Connor (1/2) 80+1'; Pen: O'Connor (2/2) 51', 75'

Brookvale Oval, Brookvale (Note: Due to a spike in COVID-19 cases in Victoria, the Rebels moved this home fixture from AAMI Park to Brookvale Oval, New South Wales, in order to respect the regulations imposed by the Queensland Government.)
Referee: Damon Murphy (Queensland)

11 July 2020
19:15 AEST (UTC+10)

Waratahs	23–14	Force
Try: Bell 40'; Staniforth 62'; Con: Harrison (2/2) 40+2', 64'; Pen: Harrison (3/3) 46', 60', 74'	Report	Try: Ralston 29'; Pen: Prior (3/3) 14', 33', 37'

Sydney Cricket Ground, Moore Park
Attendance: 1,793
Referee: Angus Gardner (New South Wales)

Bye/s: Brumbies

=== Round 3 ===
17 July 2020
19:05 AEST (UTC+10)

Reds	31–24	Force (1 BP)
Try: Paenga-Amosa 19'; Campbell 23'; Tupou 27'; Daugunu 45'; Con: O'Connor (4/4) 20', 24', 28', 46'; Drop: O'Connor 79'; Cards: Paisami (yellow card) 70'	Report	Try: McGregor 11'; Ralston (2) 14', 39'; Ready 70'; Con: Prior (2/2) 13', 15'

Lang Park, Brisbane
Attendance: 6,890
Referee: Nic Berry (Queensland)

18 July 2020
19:15 AEST (UTC+10)

(1 BP) Waratahs	23–24	Brumbies
Try: Horton 24'; Ramm 29'; Con: Harrison (2/2) 25', 30'; Pen: Harrison (3/4) 10', 15', 50'	Report	Try: Cusack 5'; Fainga'a 34'; Valetini 37'; Fines 77'; Con: Kuenzle (2/3) 38', 79'; Cards: Muirhead (yellow card) 21'

Stadium Australia, Sydney
Attendance: 1,976
Referee: Angus Gardner (New South Wales)

Bye/s: Rebels

=== Round 4 ===
24 July 2020
19:05 AEST (UTC+10)

Waratahs	10–29	Rebels
Try: Newsome 7'; Con: Harrison (1/1) 9'; Pen: Harrison (1/1) 23'; Cards: Hooper (yellow card) 31'; Holloway (yellow card) 70'	Report	Try: Louwrens 38'; Koroibete 78'; Con: To'omua (2/2) 39', 78'; Pen: To'omua (5/5) 4', 11', 15', 31', 71'

Sydney Cricket Ground, Moore Park
Attendance: 1,620
Referee: Angus Gardner (New South Wales)

25 July 2020
19:15 AEST (UTC+10)

Force	0–24	Brumbies (1 BP)
	Report	Try: Wright 2'; Simone 6'; Miller 43'; McInerney 66'; Con: Kuenzle (2/4) 7', 45'

Leichhardt Oval, Lilyfield (Note: Due to tight border restrictions, the Western Force moved their rounds 4 and 5 home matches from HBF Park to Leichhardt Oval, New South Wales.)
Attendance: 253
Referee: Damon Murphy (Queensland)

Bye/s: Reds

=== Round 5 ===
31 July 2020
19:05 AEST (UTC+10)

(1 BP) Force	20–25 (a.e.t.)	Rebels
Try: Lee-Warner 27'; Ralston 57'; Con: Lance (2/2) 28', 58'; Pen: Lance (2/3) 12', 64'; Cards: Thrush (yellow card) 50'	Report	Try: Uelese 30'; Philip 60'; Naisarani 82'; Con: To'omua (2/2) 32', 61'; Pen: To'omua (1/1) 53'; Hodge (1/2) 40+4'; Cards: Naisarani (yellow card) 25'

Leichhardt Oval, Lilyfield
Attendance: 358
Referee: Damon Murphy (Queensland)

1 August 2020
19:15 AEST (UTC+10)

Brumbies	22–20	Reds (1 BP)
Try: Fainga'a (2) 6', 33'; McInerney 75'; Con: Kuenzle (2/2) 7', 35'; Pen: Hansen (1/1) 80+3'	Report	Try: Wilson 43'; Scott-Young 46'; Con: O'Connor (2/2) 44', 47'; Pen: O'Connor (2/3) 39', 50'

Canberra Stadium, Canberra
Attendance: 1,525
Referee: Nic Berry (Queensland)

Bye/s: Waratahs

=== Round 6 ===
7 August 2020
19:05 AEST (UTC+10)

Rebels	30–12	Brumbies
Try: Hodge (2) 3', 23'; Wilkin 16'; Uelese 38'; Con: To'omua (2/4) 17', 39'; Pen: To'omua (2/2) 32', 53'	Report	Try: Powell 18'; Miller 80'; Con: Kuenzle (1/1) 20'; Cards: Cusack (yellow card) 40+1'

Leichhardt Oval, Lilyfield (Note: Due to a spike in COVID-19 cases in Victoria, the Rebels moved their rounds 6 & 9 home fixtures from AAMI Park to Leichhardt Oval, New South Wales.)
Attendance: 0 (Note: Due to the COVID-19 pandemic in Australia, the match was played behind closed doors.)
Referee: Graham Cooper (Western Australia)

8 August 2020
19:15 AEST (UTC+10)

(1 BP) Waratahs	45–12	Reds
Try: Gordon (3) 10', 17', 27'; Maddocks 24'; Newsome 35'; Horton 52'; Con: Harrison (5/5) 11', 18', 25', 29', 36'; Donaldson (1/1) 53'; Pen: Harrison (1/1) 5'	Report	Try: Hardy 54'; O'Connor 80+2'; Con: O'Connor (1/2) 80+3'; Cards: Zane Nonggorr (yellow card) 77'

Sydney Cricket Ground, Moore Park
Attendance: 1,770
Referee: Damon Murphy (Queensland)

Bye/s: Force

=== Round 7 ===
14 August 2020
19:05 AEST (UTC+10)

Force	8–28	Waratahs
Try: Stander 15'; Pen: Prior 28'	Report	Try: Newsome 35'; Maddocks 45'; Johnson-Holmes 80'; Con: Harrison (2/2) 36', 46'; Pen: Harrison (3/3) 9', 20', 32'

Robina Stadium, Gold Coast (Note: Due to tight border restrictions, the Western Force moved their rounds 7 & 8 home matches from HBF Park to Cbus Super Stadium, Gold Coast, Queensland.)
Attendance: 569
Referee: Nic Berry (Queensland)

15 August 2020
19:15 AEST (UTC+10)

(1 BP) Reds	19–3	Rebels
Try: Petaia 14'; Paenga-Amosa 28'; Stewart 73'; Con: O'Connor (2/3) 15', 29'; Cards: Paenga-Amosa (yellow card) 70'	Report	Pen: To'omua (1/1) 8'

Lang Park, Brisbane
Attendance: 6,131
Referee: Damon Murphy (Queensland)

Bye/s: Brumbies

=== Round 8 ===
21 August 2020
19:05 AEST (UTC+10)

Force	5–57	Reds (1 BP)
Try: Ready 43'; Cards: Longbottom (yellow card) 53'	Report	Try: Daugunu (2) 16', 29'; McReight 55'; McDermott (2) 59', 64'; O'Connor 70'; Hegarty 73'; Tualima 80'; Con: O'Connor (7/8) 17', 57', 61', 65', 71', 74', 80'; Pen: O'Connor (1/1) 38'

Robina Stadium, Gold Coast
Attendance: 1,575
Referee: Jordan Way (Queensland)

22 August 2020
19:15 AEST (UTC+10)

(1 BP) Brumbies	38–11	Waratahs
Try: R. Lonergan 15'; Muirhead 24'; Samu (2) 46', 73'; Wright (2) 53', 58'; Con: R. Lonergan (2/3) 16', 47'; Kuenzle (2/3) 54', 73'	Report	Try: Dempsey 37'; Pen: Harrison (2/2) 19', 29'

Canberra Stadium, Canberra
Attendance: 1,281
Referee: Angus Gardner (New South Wales)

Bye/s: Rebels

=== Round 9 ===
28 August 2020
19:05 AEST (UTC+10)

(1 BP) Brumbies	31–14	Force
Try: Wright 32'; Banks 39'; Miller 51'; Ikitau 65'; Muirhead 75'; Con: Kuenzle (3/5) 52', 66', 76'	Report	Try: Lee-Warner 9'; Lance 55'; Con: Prior (2/2) 11', 57'

Canberra Stadium, Canberra
Attendance: 2,209
Referee: Amy Perrett (New South Wales)

29 August 2020
19:15 AEST (UTC+10)

(1 BP) Rebels	32–38	Waratahs
Try: To'omua 37'; Naisarani (2) 46', 72'; Koroibete 62'; Con: To'omua (3/4) 39', 47', 64'; Pen: To'omua (2/3) 3', 78'; Cards: Philip (yellow card) 65'	Report	Try: Gordon 7'; Dempsey 23'; Johnson-Holmes 49'; Walton 56'; Harrison 74'; Con: Harrison (5/5) 8', 23', 50', 57', 75'; Pen: Harrison (1/1) 40'; Cards: Hanigan (yellow card) 37'

Leichhardt Oval
Attendance: 1,758
Referee: Graham Cooper (Western Australia)

Bye/s: Reds

=== Round 10 – Super Saturday ===
5 September 2020
17:05 AEST (UTC+10)

Rebels	34–30	Force (1 BP)
Try: Pincus 18'; Hodge 28'; D. Haylett-Petty 59'; Eloff 79'; Con: To'omua (4/4) 18', 30', 61', 80'; Pen: To'omua (2/2) 24', 26'; Cards: Pincus (yellow card) 56'	Report	Try: Taefu 20'; Ready (2) 40', 44'; Stander 58'; Con: Prior (2/4) 45', 59'; Pen: Prior (2/2) 9', 56'; Cards: Ralston (yellow card) 61'; Lee-Warner (yellow card) 75'

Newcastle International Sports Centre, Newcastle (Note: Due to a spike in COVID-19 cases in Victoria, the Rebels moved their round 10 home fixture from AAMI Park to McDonald Jones Stadium, New South Wales.)
Attendance: 817
Referee: Angus Gardner (New South Wales)

5 September 2020
19:15 AEST (UTC+10)

Reds	26–7	Brumbies
Try: Wright 6'; Feauai-Sautia 36'; McDermott 76'; Con: O'Connor (1/2) 38'; Pen: O'Connor (3/3) 18', 31', 66'	Report	Try: Samu 40'; Con: Kuenzle (1/1) 40'

Lang Park, Brisbane
Attendance: 9,922
Referee: Nic Berry (Queensland)

Bye/s: Waratahs

== Finals ==
=== Bracket ===
Qualifying final
12 September – Brisbane
Reds	25
Rebels	13

Grand Final
19 September – Canberra
Brumbies	28
Reds	23

=== Qualifying final ===
12 September 2020
19:15 AEST (UTC+10)

Reds	25–13	Rebels
Try: Petaia 9'; Salakaia-Loto 44'; Daugunu 75'; Con: O'Connor (2/3) 10', 46'; Pen: O'Connor (2/3) 25', 58'	Report	Try: Koroibete 40'; Con: To'omua (1/1) 40'; Pen: To'omua (1/1) 17'; Hodge (1/1) 54'

Lang Park, Brisbane
Attendance: 11,607
Referee: Nic Berry (Queensland)

=== Grand Final ===
19 September 2020
19:15 AEST (UTC+10)

Brumbies	28–23	Reds
Try: Fainga'a 17'; Muirhead 26'; Banks 45'; Con: Lolesio (2/3) 18', 47'; Pen: Lolesio (2/3) 5', 55'; Drop: Lolesio 49'	Report	Try: Wilson 31'; Blyth 64'; Con: O'Connor (2/2) 32', 65'; Pen: O'Connor (3/3) 13', 40+2', 59'; Cards: Daugunu (yellow card) 50'

Canberra Stadium, Canberra
Attendance: 6,000
Referee: Angus Gardner (New South Wales)

Brumbies	Reds

FB	15	Tom Banks
RW	14	Andy Muirhead	(substituted off) 59'
OC	13	Tevita Kuridrani
IC	12	Irae Simone
LW	11	Tom Wright
FH	10	Noah Lolesio	(substituted off) 79'
SH	9	Joe Powell	(substituted off) 50'
N8	8	Pete Samu				(substituted off) 79'
OF	7	Will Miller			(substituted off) 73'	(substituted on) 79'
BF	6	Lachlan McCaffrey	(substituted off) 51'	(substituted on) 65'
RL	5	Cadeyrn Neville
LL	4	Murray Douglas	(substituted off) 73'
TP	3	Allan Alaalatoa
HK	2	Folau Fainga'a	(substituted off) 59'
LP	1	Scott Sio	(substituted off) 50'
Substitutes:
HK	16	Connal McInerney	(substituted on) 59'
PR	17	James Slipper	(substituted on) 50'
PR	18	Tom Ross
LK	19	Nick Frost	(substituted on) 73'
BR	20	Rob Valetini	(substituted on) 51'	(substituted off) 65'	(substituted on) 73'
SH	21	Nic White	(substituted on) 50'
FH	22	Bayley Kuenzle	(substituted on) 79'
WG	23	Solomone Kata	(substituted on) 59'
Coach:
Dan McKellar

FB	15	Jock Campbell
RW	14	Jordan Petaia	(substituted off) 40'
OC	13	Hunter Paisami
IC	12	Hamish Stewart
LW	11	Filipo Daugunu
FH	10	James O'Connor
SH	9	Tate McDermott	(substituted off) 65'
N8	8	Harry Wilson
OF	7	Fraser McReight
BF	6	Liam Wright
RL	5	Lukhan Salakaia-Loto	(substituted off) 44'
LL	4	Angus Blyth	(substituted off) 79'
TP	3	Taniela Tupou
HK	2	Brandon Paenga-Amosa
LP	1	JP Smith	(substituted off) 51'
Substitutes:
HK	16	Josh Nasser
PR	17	Harry Hoopert	(substituted on) 51'
PR	18	Ruan Smith
LK	19	Tuaina Taii Tualima	(substituted on) 79'
FL	20	Angus Scott-Young	(substituted on) 44'
SH	21	Moses Sorovi	(substituted on) 65'
FH	22	Bryce Hegarty	(substituted on) 40'
FB	23	Jack Hardy
Coach:
Brad Thorn

Man of the Match:
Noah Lolesio (Brumbies)

Assistant referees:
Amy Perrett (New South Wales)
Reuben Keane (Australian Capital Territory)
Television match official:
James Leckie (New South Wales)

== Squads ==
Brumbies squad
Forwards	Allan Alaalatoa • Jahrome Brown • Tom Cusack • Murray Douglas • Folau Fainga'a • Nick Frost • Ben Hyne • Harry Lloyd • Lachlan Lonergan • Lachlan McCaffrey • Connal McInerney • Will Miller • Cadeyrn Neville • Tom Ross • Pete Samu • Scott Sio • James Slipper • Darcy Swain • Rob Valetini • Shambeckler Vui
Backs	Tom Banks • Issak Fines • Mack Hansen • Len Ikitau • Solomone Kata • Bayley Kuenzle • Tevita Kuridrani • Noah Lolesio • Ryan Lonergan • Andy Muirhead • Reesjan Pasitoa • Guy Porter • Joe Powell • Toni Pulu • Irae Simone • Nic White • Tom Wright
Coach	Dan McKellar

Force squad
Forwards	Ollie Atkins • Johan Bardoul • Ollie Callan • Pekahou Cowan • Tevin Ferris • Ben Grant • Dom Hardman • Victor Harris • Chris Heiberg • Greg Holmes • Feleti Kaitu'u • Kane Koteka • Fergus Lee-Warner • Kieran Longbottom • Jackson Pugh • Andrew Ready • Tom Sheminant • Brynard Stander • Henry Stowers • Heath Tessmann • Jeremy Thrush • Angus Wagner
Backs	Jake Abel • AJ Alatimu • Marcel Brache • Pama Fou • Nick Frisby • Kyle Godwin • Nick Jooste • Richard Kahui • Brad Lacey • Jono Lance • Jordan Luke • Grason Makara • Jack McGregor • Rory O'Sullivan • Jonah Placid • Ian Prior • Byron Ralston • Jake Strachan • Henry Taefu
Coach	Tim Sampson

Rebels squad
Forwards	Charlie Abel • Jermaine Ainsley • Angus Cottrell • Cabous Eloff • Mees Erasmus • Pone Fa'amausili • Matt Gibbon • Esei Ha'angana • Richard Hardwick • Ross Haylett-Petty • Trevor Hosea • Josh Kemeny • Boyd Killingworth • Gideon Koegelenberg • Rob Leota • Efi Ma'afu • Declan Moore • Isi Naisarani • Cameron Orr • Matt Philip • Anaru Rangi • Jeral Skelton • Michael Stolberg • Jordan Uelese • Michael Wells • Brad Wilkin
Backs	Lachie Anderson • Andrew Deegan • Tom English • Dane Haylett-Petty • Reece Hodge • Lewis Holland • Andrew Kellaway • Marika Koroibete • Frank Lomani • Ryan Louwrens • Campbell Magnay • Bill Meakes • Tom Pincus • Theo Strang • Matt To'omua • Semisi Tupou • James Tuttle
Coach	David Wessels

Reds squad
Forwards	Angus Blyth • Sean Farrell • David Feao • Jethro Felemi • Feao Fotuaika • Harry Hoopert • Tom Kibble • Alex Mafi • Fraser McReight • Josh Nasser • Zane Nonggorr • Brandon Paenga-Amosa • Lukhan Salakaia-Loto • Angus Scott-Young • JP Smith • Ruan Smith • Ryan Smith • Jack Straker • Tuaina Taii Tualima • Taniela Tupou • Seru Uru • Harry Wilson • Michael Wood • Liam Wright • Dane Zander
Backs	Jock Campbell • Filipo Daugunu • Chris Feauai-Sautia • Josh Flook • Carter Gordon • Jack Hardy • Bryce Hegarty • Scott Malolua • Tate McDermott • James O'Connor • Hunter Paisami • Jordan Petaia • Henry Speight • Moses Sorovi • Hamish Stewart
Coach	Brad Thorn

Waratahs squad
Forwards	Robbie Abel • Angus Bell • Darcy Breen • Joe Cotton • Jack Dempsey • Max Douglas • Tetera Faulkner • Charlie Gamble • Ned Hanigan • Will Harris • Jed Holloway • Michael Hooper • Tom Horton • Harry Johnson-Holmes • Ryan McCauley • Dave Porecki • Tom Robertson • Rob Simmons • Hugh Sinclair • Tom Staniforth • Lachlan Swinton • Pat Tafa • Chris Talakai • Tiaan Tauakipulu • Carlo Tizzano • Andrew Tuala • Jeremy Williams
Backs	Cam Clark • Ben Donaldson • Lalakai Foketi • Jake Gordon • Will Harrison • Karmichael Hunt • Jack Maddocks • Nick Malouf • Michael McDonald • Tepai Moeroa • Mark Nawaqanitawase • Alex Newsome • James Ramm • Triston Reilly • Henry Robertson • Mitch Short • Jack Walsh • Joey Walton
Coach	Rob Penney
