= Super Rugby Trans-Tasman =

Men's rugby union club competition

- Official Logos for Australia (left) and New Zealand (right)
- Countries: Australia; New Zealand
- Tournament format(s): Round-robin tournament
- Champions: Blues (1st title)
- Matches played: 26
- Tries scored: 219 (8.42 per match)
- Top point scorer(s): Richie Mo'unga, Crusaders (68)
- Top try scorer(s): Sevu Reece, Crusaders (6)
- Official website: Official site

Super Rugby Trans-Tasman (known as Harvey Norman Super Rugby Trans-Tasman in Australia and Sky Super Rugby Trans-Tasman in New Zealand) was a professional men's rugby union club competition in Australia and New Zealand. It featured the five Super Rugby AU teams playing the five Super Rugby Aotearoa teams, followed by a final, and ran from 14 May to 19 June 2021.

Announced on 13 November, the competition followed the 2021 Super Rugby AU season and the 2021 Super Rugby Aotearoa season, with the fixtures being confirmed on 14 December. Each team hosted two home games, while the third round was expected to be a 'Super Round', with all the games being played at a single venue. Ahead of the start of the competition, the Super Round was cancelled due to COVID-19 restrictions, with the matches held at separate venues, although they were still classified as 'neutral venues'.

== Law variations ==
Super Rugby Trans-Tasman saw the same law variations that were used in the 2021 Super Rugby AU season used in the competition. Goal-line dropouts and the ability to replace a red carded player after 20 minutes were carried over to this competition as were used in both Super Rugby AU and the 2021 Super Rugby Aotearoa season. The captain's referral and Golden Point extra time used in the 2021 Super Rugby Aotearoa season though were not used in Super Rugby Trans-Tasman, while the 50/22 kicking law, restart variation and Golden Try extra time used in the 2021 Super Rugby AU season were also not used in the competition.

== Standings ==
Pos	Team	Pld	W	D	L	PF	PA	PD	TF	TA	TB	LB	Pts
1	(New Zealand) Blues	5	5	0	0	198	79	+119	26	10	3	0	23
2	(New Zealand) Highlanders	5	5	0	0	199	96	+103	30	13	3	0	23
3	(New Zealand) Crusaders	5	5	0	0	229	132	+97	35	18	3	0	23
4	(New Zealand) Hurricanes	5	4	0	1	195	93	+102	29	13	4	1	21
5	(New Zealand) Chiefs	5	4	0	1	170	111	+59	26	17	2	1	19
6	(Australia) Brumbies	5	1	0	4	82	152	−70	12	22	0	1	5
7	(Australia) Reds	5	1	0	4	125	211	−86	18	30	0	1	5
8	(Australia) Force	5	0	0	5	82	148	−66	11	23	0	1	1
9	(Australia) Rebels	5	0	0	5	95	215	−120	14	31	0	0	0
10	(Australia) Waratahs	5	0	0	5	127	265	−138	16	40	0	0	0

Rules for classification:
- 4 points to the winning team
- 2 points to each team if match is drawn
- 1 bonus point for a loss by seven points or fewer
- 1 bonus point to any team scoring at least three tries more than the opposition

== Round-by-round ==
The table below shows the progression of all teams throughout Super Rugby Trans-Tasman. Each team's tournament points on the standings log is shown for each round, with the overall log position in brackets.

Super Rugby Trans-Tasman team progression
Team	R1	R2	R3	R4	R5	Final
Blues	5 (1st)	10 (1st)	15 (1st	19 (1st)	23 (1st)	Won
Brumbies	1 (7th)	1 (7th)	1 (8th)	5 (6th)	5 (6th)	DNQ
Chiefs	4 (5th)	9 (5th)	10 (5th)	14 (5th)	19 (5th)	DNQ
Crusaders	4 (4th)	9 (3rd)	14 (3rd)	18 (3rd)	23 (3rd)	DNQ
Force	1 (6th)	1 (6th)	1 (7th)	1 (8th)	1 (8th)	DNQ
Highlanders	5 (2nd)	9 (4th)	13 (4th)	18 (2nd)	23 (2nd)	Lost
Hurricanes	5 (3rd)	10 (2nd)	15 (2nd)	16 (4th)	21 (4th)	DNQ
Rebels	0 (10th)	0 (10th)	0 (10th)	0 (9th)	0 (9th)	DNQ
Reds	0 (9th)	0 (9th)	4 (6th)	5 (7th)	5 (7th)	DNQ
Waratahs	0 (8th)	0 (8th)	0 (9th)	0 (10th)	0 (10th)	DNQ
Key:	Win	Draw	Loss	DNQ		

== Matches ==
=== Round 1 ===
14 May 2021
19:05 (UTC+12)

(1 BP) Highlanders	40–19	Reds
Try: Gregory 1' c A. Dixon (2) 28' c, 50' m Tomkinson 34' c Coltman 71' c N. Punivai 74' c Con: Hunt (5/6) 2', 29', 35', 72', 76'	Report	Try: Thomas 5' c Vunivalu (2) 46' m, 80+1' c Con: J. O'Connor (1/2) 6'; Hegarty (1/1) 80+2'

Forsyth Barr Stadium, Dunedin
Attendance: 10,862
Referee: Ben O'Keeffe (New Zealand)

14 May 2021
19:45 (UTC+10)

Waratahs	48–64	Hurricanes (1 BP)
Try: Newsome 7' c Bell 16' c J. Gordon 39' c Johnson-Holmes (2) 49' c, 59' m Swinton 70' c Maddocks 80+1' m Con: Donaldson (5/7) 8', 17', 40', 50', 71'; Pen: Donaldson (1/1) 21'	Report	Try: J. Savea (2) 4' m, 46' c B. Proctor (2) 12' c, 37' c J. Barrett 24' c Coles 32' c Iose 55' c P. Umaga-Jensen 61' c Patafilo 74' m Aumua 78' m Con: J. Barrett (7/8) 13', 24', 33', 37', 47', 55', 63'

Sydney Cricket Ground, Sydney
Attendance: 7,202
Referee: Nic Berry (Australia)

15 May 2021
19:05 (UTC+12)

Crusaders	31–29	Brumbies (1 BP)
Try: Blackadder 5' m Mo'unga 29' c D. Havili 36' c B. O'Connor 63' m Grace 69' c Con: Mo'unga (3/5) 30', 37', 70'	Report	Try: Sio 27' c Simone 50' c Banks 72' c Valetini 80' m Con: Lolesio (3/4) 28', 51', 74'; Pen: Lolesio (1/1) 59'

Orangetheory Stadium, Christchurch
Attendance: 11,000
Referee: Paul Williams (New Zealand)

15 May 2021
19:45 (UTC+10)

Rebels	3–50	Blues (1 BP)
Pen: To'omua (1/1) 11'	Report	Try: Robinson 40+2' m Sotutu (2) 47' c, 56' c A. Ioane (2) 61' m, 74' c A. Lam 66' c Con: Black (2/3) 48', 57'; Plummer (2/3) 67', 75'; Pen: Black (3/3) 7', 17', 26'; Z. Sullivan (1/1) 32'

AAMI Park, Melbourne
Referee: Brendon Pickerill (New Zealand)

15 May 2021
19:55 (UTC+8)

(1 BP) Force	19–20	Chiefs
Try: Penalty try 36'; Kahui 69' c Miotti 80+1' m Con: Miotti (1/2) 70'	Report	Try: Nankivell 6' c Harris 54' m Lowe 57' m Con: McKenzie (1/3) 7'; Pen: McKenzie (1/1) 40'

HBF Park, Perth
Attendance: 13,028
Referee: Damon Murphy (Australia)

=== Round 2 ===
21 May 2021
19:05 (UTC+12)

(1 BP) Hurricanes	35–13	Rebels
Try: J. Savea (2) 20' c, 55' c B. Proctor 24' c Goosen 66' c Aumua 73' c Con: J. Barrett (4/4) 20', 25', 56', 67'; Leger (1/1) 75'	Report	Try: Wells 47' m Magnay 60' m Pen: To'omua (1/1) 23'

Sky Stadium, Wellington
Attendance: 7,629
Referee: Graham Cooper (Australia)

21 May 2021
17:45 (UTC+8)

Force	15–25	Highlanders
Try: Cubelli 39' c Wagner 79' m Con: Miotti (1/2) 40'; Pen: Miotti (1/1) 29'	Report	Try: Nareki 12' c Johnstone 23' m Gregory (2) 36' m, 61' m Con: Hunt (1/4) 13'; Pen: Hunt (1/1) 32'

HBF Park, Perth
Attendance: 13,587
Referee: Nic Berry (Australia)

22 May 2021
16:35 (UTC+12)

(1 BP) Blues	48–21	Waratahs
Try: Heem (3) 8' m, 68' m, 78' c Robinson 28' c Eklund 37' c R. Ioane 48' c Penalty try 58'; Con: Black (4/6) 29', 38', 50', 79'; Pen: Black (1/1) 4'	Report	Try: Bell 31' c J. Gordon 34' c Porecki 63' c Con: Harrison (3/3) 32', 35', 64'

Eden Park, Auckland
Attendance: 10,230
Referee: Brendon Pickerill (New Zealand)

22 May 2021
19:05 (UTC+12)

(1 BP) Chiefs	40–19	Brumbies
Try: Vaa'i 4' m Jacobson (2) 21' c, 30' c McKenzie 45' c Nankivell 51' c A. Lienert-Brown 65' c Con: McKenzie (5/6) 21', 31', 47', 51', 65'	Report	Try: Ikitau 12' m Kuenzle 58' c Valetini 80' c Con: Lolesio (2/3) 58', 80+1'

FMG Stadium Waikato, Hamilton
Attendance: 10,684
Referee: Ben O'Keeffe (New Zealand)

22 May 2021
19:45 (UTC+10)

Reds	28–63	Crusaders (1 BP)
Try: McDermott 36' c Wilson 61' c Vunivalu 64' c Paenga-Amosa 79' c Con: J. O'Connor (4/4) 37', 62', 65', 79'	Report	Try: Mo'unga (3) 6' c, 29' c, 54' c Reece (2) 12' c, 44' c Grace 15' c Williams 69' c Taylor 75' c Con: Mo'unga (8/8) 7', 13', 16', 31', 46', 55', 70', 76'

Suncorp Stadium, Brisbane
Attendance: 22,088
Referee: Mike Fraser (New Zealand)

=== Round 3 ===
28 May 2021
19:05 (UTC+12)

(1 BP) Hurricanes	43–6	Force
Try: Aumua 13' c Rayasi (2) 21' c, 58' c Kirifi 38' m Goosen 47' m Laumape 73' c J. Barrett 80+2' m Con: J. Barrett (4/7) 14', 23', 59', 74'	Report	Pen: Miotti (2/2) 6', 11'

McLean Park, Napier (Note: The match between the Hurricanes and the Force was meant to be part of the Super Round of Super Rugby Trans-Tasman; however, due to COVID-19 restrictions, the Super Round was cancelled, with the match played at McLean Park, Napier, instead.)
Attendance: 9,226
Referee: James Doleman (New Zealand)

29 May 2021
15:05 (UTC+10)

Waratahs	28–54	Crusaders (1 BP)
Try: Maddocks 52' c Perese 54' c Newsome 80' m Con: Harrison (2/3) 53', 55'; Pen: Harrison (3/3) 16', 26', 39'	Report	Try: Drummond 8' c Taylor 30' m Reece 36' c McLeod 40' c S. Barrett 42' c Fainga'anuku 58' c Hall 64' c Jordan 75' c Con: Mo'unga (7/8) 9', 37', 40+2', 43', 59', 65', 76'

WIN Stadium, Wollongong (Note: The match between the Waratahs and the Crusaders was meant to be part of the Super Round of Super Rugby Trans-Tasman; however, due to COVID-19 restrictions, the Super Round was cancelled, with the match played at WIN Stadium, Wollongong, instead.)
Attendance: 5,486
Referee: Graham Cooper (Australia)

29 May 2021
19:15 (UTC+12)

(1 BP) Blues	38–10	Brumbies
Try: Eklund 16' c F. Christie 39' c Heem 48' c A. Lam 49' c Faiane 71' c Con: Black (4/4) 17', 40', 49', 61'; Plummer (1/1) 72'; Pen: Black (1/1) 38'	Report	Try: McInerney 34' c Con: Lolesio (1/1) 36'; Pen: Lolesio (1/1) 23'

Eden Park, Auckland (Note: The match between the Blues and the Brumbies was meant to be part of the Super Round of Super Rugby Trans-Tasman; however, due to COVID-19 restrictions, the Super Round was cancelled, with the match played at Eden Park, Auckland, instead.)
Attendance: 6,150
Referee: Damon Murphy (Australia)

29 May 2021
19:05 (UTC+10)

Reds	40–34	Chiefs (1 BP)
Try: Penalty try 15'; Henry (2) 22' m, 37' c Vunivalu 24' c Fotuaika 31' c Daugunu 57' c Con: J. O'Connor (4/5) 26', 32', 38', 58'	Report	Try: Sowakula 52' m Vaa'i 64' c O'Neill 68' c B. Sullivan 76' c Roe 78' m Con: Trask (3/5) 65', 69', 77'; Pen: McKenzie (1/1) 19'

Queensland Country Bank Stadium, Townsville (Note: The match between the Reds and the Chiefs was meant to be part of the Super Round of Super Rugby Trans-Tasman; however, due to COVID-19 restrictions, the Super Round was cancelled, with the match played at Queensland Country Bank Stadium, Townsville, instead.)
Attendance: 9,238
Referee: Nic Berry (Australia)

30 May 2021
15:00 (UTC+10)

Highlanders	42–27	Rebels
Try: Collins 2' c Tomkinson 15' c Penalty try 48'; Dickson 52' c Nareki 56' c Harmon 79' c Con: Hunt (5/5) 3', 16', 53', 57', 79'	Report	Try: Koroibete (2) 27' m, 77' m Eloff 39' c Gibbon 61' c Con: To'omua (2/4) 40', 63'; Pen: Worth (1/1) 44'

Leichhardt Oval, Sydney (Note: The match between the Highlanders and the Rebels was meant to be part of the Super Round of Super Rugby Trans-Tasman; however, due to COVID-19 restrictions, the Super Round was cancelled, and the match was originally moved to Sir John Davies Oval, Queenstown, instead. Further COVID-19 restrictions in the state of Victoria meant the Rebels could not travel to New Zealand, and the match was relocated to Leichhardt Oval, Sydney.)
Attendance: 1,387
Referee: Paul Williams (New Zealand)

=== Round 4 ===
4 June 2021
19:05 (UTC+12)

Crusaders	29–21	Force
Try: Mataele 13' c Jordan (2) 20' m, 47' m Douglas 28' m S. Havili 40+2' c Con: Burke (2/5) 15', 40+2'	Report	Try: Pulu 3' c O. Callan 32' c Olowofela 80' c Con: Miotti (2/2) 5', 33'; Prior (1/1) 80+2'

Orangetheory Stadium, Christchurch
Referee: Ben O'Keeffe (New Zealand)

4 June 2021
19:45 (UTC+10)

(1 BP) Reds	24–31	Blues
Try: Wilson 21' c Paenga-Amosa 49' c Daugunu 71' c Con: Henry (3/3) 23', 50', 72'; Pen: Daugunu (1/1) 80'	Report	Try: Papalii 27' c Tele'a 34' c P. Tuipulotu 44' c Christie 54' c Con: Black (4/4) 29', 36', 45', 55'; Pen: Black (1/1) 12'

Suncorp Stadium, Brisbane
Attendance: 13,218
Referee: Mike Fraser (New Zealand)

5 June 2021
19:05 (UTC+12)

(1 BP) Highlanders	59–23	Waratahs
Try: Collins 2' c Tomkinson 15' c De Groot (2) 21' m, 45' c A. Dixon 33' c Nareki (2) 40+1' c, 71' c Himeno 62' m Ben-Nicholas 76' c Con: Hunt (7/9) 3', 16', 35', 40+3', 47', 73', 78'	Report	Try: Maddocks 11' c Nawaqanitawase 18' c Con: Harrison (2/2) 12', 19'; Pen: Harrison (3/3) 9', 29', 39'

Forsyth Barr Stadium, Dunedin
Referee: Damon Murphy (Australia)

5 June 2021
19:45 (UTC+10)

Brumbies	12–10	Hurricanes (1 BP)
Try: R. Lonergan 12' c Ikitau 52' m Con: Lolesio (1/1) 13'	Report	Try: Coles 17' c Con: J. Barrett (1/1) 19'; Pen: J. Barrett (1/4) 37'

GIO Stadium, Canberra
Attendance: 6,013
Referee: Paul Williams (New Zealand)

6 June 2021 (Note: The match between the Chiefs and the Rebels was originally scheduled for 5 June 2021; however, due to COVID-19 restrictions affecting the Rebels team, the match was rescheduled for 6 June 2021.)
15:00 (UTC+10)

Chiefs	36–26	Rebels
Try: Trask (2) 16' m, 53' m A. Lienert-Brown (2) 21' c, 25' c Tiatia (2) 44' c, 65' m Con: Gatland (3/6) 22', 26', 45'	Report	Try: Naisarani (2) 28' c, 40' c Ili 35' m Kellaway 56' c Con: To'omua (3/4) 30', 40+1', 57'

Leichhardt Oval, Sydney (Note: The match between the Chiefs and the Rebels was originally scheduled to take place at FMG Stadium Waikato, Hamilton; however, due to COVID-19 restrictions affecting the Rebels team, the match was moved to Leichhardt Oval, Sydney.)
Attendance: 1,353
Referee: Graham Cooper (Australia)

=== Round 5 ===
11 June 2021
19:05 (UTC+12)

(1 BP) Hurricanes	43–14	Reds
Try: Laumape 4' c Love 45' c Coles (2) 59' m, 76' c Penalty try 64'; Flanders 71' c Con: J. Barrett (4/5) 5', 46', 72', 77'; Pen: J. Barrett (1/1) 35'	Report	Try: McDermott 27' c Paenga-Amosa 49' c Con: Hegarty (2/2) 27', 50'

Sky Stadium, Wellington
Attendance: 9,736
Referee: James Doleman (New Zealand)

11 June 2021
19:45 (UTC+10)

Brumbies	12–33	Highlanders (1 BP)
Try: Ikitau 15' m L. Lonergan 33' c Con: Kuenzle (1/2) 34'	Report	Try: A. Dixon 20' c A. Smith (2) 26' c, 47' c Harmon 57' m Tomkinson 63' c Con: Hunt (4/5) 21', 28', 47', 65'

GIO Stadium, Canberra
Attendance: 5,175
Referee: Mike Fraser (New Zealand)

12 June 2021
14:35 (UTC+10)

Rebels	26–52	Crusaders (1 BP)
Try: Hosea 14' c Powell 34' m G. Vaihu 56' c Lomani 63' c Con: C. Gordon (3/4) 15', 57', 63'	Report	Try: Drummond 3' c Jordan 5' c L. Fainga'anuku 19' m Reece (3) 21' c, 46' m, 59' c Jager 66' c Ennor 73' c Con: Mo'unga (6/8) 4', 6', 23', 60' 67', 73'

Leichhardt Oval, Sydney (Note: The match between the Rebels and the Crusaders was originally scheduled to take place at AAMI Park, Melbourne; however, due to COVID-19 restrictions affecting the Rebels team, the match was moved to Leichhardt Oval, Sydney.)
Attendance: 2,496
Referee: Nic Berry (Australia)

12 June 2021
19:05 (UTC+12)

Blues	31–21	Force
Try: Sotutu (2) 10' c, 38' c Tele'a 28' c Papalii 34' c Con: Black (4/4) 12', 30', 35', 40'; Pen: Black (1/1) 64'	Report	Try: Kaitu'u 48' c Kuridrani 56' c Kearney 77' c Con: Prior (2/2) 49', 58'; Miotti (1/1) 78'

Eden Park, Auckland
Attendance: 11,400
Referee: Ben O'Keeffe (New Zealand)

12 June 2021
19:45 (UTC+10)

Waratahs	7–40	Chiefs (1 BP)
Try: Nawaqanitawase 34' c Con: Harrison (1/1) 35'	Report	Try: Wainui (5) 2' c, 15' c, 45' c, 51' c, 80+1' m Taulani 70' c Con: Gatland (4/4) 3', 16', 46', 53'; Trask (1/2) 71'

Brookvale Oval, Sydney
Attendance: 5,641
Referee: Jordan Way (Australia)

=== Final ===
19 June 2021
19:05 (UTC+12)

Blues	23–15	Highlanders
Try: Tele'a 17' c Gibson 77' c Con: Black (1/1) 18'; Plummer (1/1) 78'; Pen: Plummer (2/2) 25', 70'; Black (1/1) 40+2'	Report; Summary	Pen: Hunt (4/4) 6', 35', 60', 65'; J. Ioane (1/1) 67'

Eden Park, Auckland
Attendance: 31,800
Referee: Mike Fraser (New Zealand)

Blues	Highlanders

FB	15	(New Zealand) Zarn Sullivan
RW	14	(New Zealand) Bryce Heem
OC	13	(New Zealand) Rieko Ioane
IC	12	(New Zealand) TJ Faiane
LW	11	(New Zealand) Mark Tele'a
FH	10	(New Zealand) Otere Black	(substituted off) 24'	(substituted on) 35'	(substituted off) 67'
SH	9	(Scotland) Finlay Christie	(substituted off) 67'
N8	8	(New Zealand) Hoskins Sotutu
OF	7	(New Zealand) Dalton Papalii
BF	6	(New Zealand) Akira Ioane	(substituted off) 67'
RL	5	(New Zealand) Gerard Cowley-Tuioti
LL	4	(New Zealand) Patrick Tuipulotu (c)	(substituted off) 58'	(substituted on) 64'
TP	3	(New Zealand) Nepo Laulala	(substituted off) 51'
HK	2	(New Zealand) Kurt Eklund	(substituted off) 80+1'
LP	1	(New Zealand) Alex Hodgman	(substituted off) 49'
Substitutes:
HK	16	(Samoa) Ray Niuia	(substituted on) 80+1'
PR	17	(New Zealand) Karl Tu'inukuafe	(substituted on) 49'
PR	18	(New Zealand) Marcel Renata	(substituted on) 51'
LK	19	(New Zealand) Josh Goodhue	(substituted on) 58'	(substituted off) 64'
LF	20	(New Zealand) Blake Gibson	(substituted on) 67'
SH	21	(New Zealand) Jonathan Ruru	(substituted on) 67'
FH	22	(New Zealand) Harry Plummer	(substituted on) 24'	(substituted off) 35'	(substituted on) 67'
OB	23	(New Zealand) AJ Lam
Coach:
(New Zealand) Leon MacDonald

FB	15	(New Zealand) Josh Ioane
RW	14	(New Zealand) Sio Tomkinson		(substituted off) 28'	(substituted on) 35'	(substituted off) 73'
OC	13	(New Zealand) Michael Collins
IC	12	(New Zealand) Scott Gregory
LW	11	(New Zealand) Jona Nareki
FH	10	(New Zealand) Mitchell Hunt
SH	9	(New Zealand) Aaron Smith (cc)
N8	8	(Japan) Kazuki Himeno		(substituted off) 78'
OF	7	(New Zealand) Billy Harmon
BF	6	(New Zealand) Hugh Renton		(substituted off) 54'
RL	5	(New Zealand) Pari Pari Parkinson		(substituted off) 49'
LL	4	(New Zealand) Bryn Evans
TP	3	(Tonga) Siate Tokolahi		(substituted off) 54'
HK	2	(New Zealand) Ash Dixon (cc)	(yellow card) 24' to 34'			(substituted off) 49'
LP	1	(New Zealand) Ethan de Groot		(substituted off) 49'
Substitutes:
HK	16	(New Zealand) Liam Coltman		(substituted on) 28'	(substituted off) 35'	(substituted on) 49'
PR	17	(New Zealand) Ayden Johnstone		(substituted on) 49'
PR	18	(New Zealand) Josh Hohneck		(substituted on) 54'
LK	19	(New Zealand) Josh Dickson		(substituted on) 49'
LF	20	(New Zealand) James Lentjes		(substituted on) 54'
SH	21	(New Zealand) Kayne Hammington
OB	22	(New Zealand) Sam Gilbert				(substituted on) 73'
LF	23	(New Zealand) Teariki Ben-Nicholas		(substituted on) 78'
Coach:
(New Zealand) Clarke Dermody

Man of the Match:
Hoskins Sotutu (Blues)

Assistant referees:
Ben O'Keeffe (New Zealand)
Paul Williams (New Zealand)
Television match official:
Brendon Pickerill (New Zealand)

== Statistics ==
As of 19 June 2021

=== Leading point scorers ===
No.	Player	Team	Points	Average	Details
1	(New Zealand) Richie Mo'unga	(New Zealand) Crusaders	68	17.00	4 T, 24 C, 0 P, 0 D
2	(New Zealand) Otere Black	(New Zealand) Blues	62	10.33	0 T, 19 C, 8 P, 0 D
3	(New Zealand) Mitchell Hunt	(New Zealand) Highlanders	59	9.83	0 T, 22 C, 5 P, 0 D
4	(New Zealand) Jordie Barrett	(New Zealand) Hurricanes	56	11.20	2 T, 20 C, 2 P, 0 D
5	(Australia) Will Harrison	(Australia) Waratahs	34	6.80	0 T, 8 C, 6 P, 0 D
6	(New Zealand) Sevu Reece	(New Zealand) Crusaders	30	7.50	6 T, 0 C, 0 P, 0 D
7	(New Zealand) Sean Wainui	(New Zealand) Chiefs	25	25.00	5 T, 0 C, 0 P, 0 D
8	(Argentina) Domingo Miotti	(Australia) Force	24	4.80	1 T, 5 C, 3 P, 0 D
9	(New Zealand) Damian McKenzie	(New Zealand) Chiefs	23	7.67	1 T, 6 C, 2 P, 0 D
10	11 players		20	11 players	

Source: Points

=== Leading try scorers ===
No.	Player	Team	Tries	Average
1	(New Zealand) Sevu Reece	(New Zealand) Crusaders	6	1.50
2	(New Zealand) Sean Wainui	(New Zealand) Chiefs	5	5.00
3	(New Zealand) Dane Coles	(New Zealand) Hurricanes	4	1.00
3	(New Zealand) Ash Dixon	(New Zealand) Highlanders	4	0.67
3	(New Zealand) Bryce Heem	(New Zealand) Blues	4	0.67
3	(New Zealand) Will Jordan	(New Zealand) Crusaders	4	1.00
3	(New Zealand) Richie Mo'unga	(New Zealand) Crusaders	4	1.00
3	(New Zealand) Jona Nareki	(New Zealand) Highlanders	4	0.67
3	(New Zealand) Julian Savea	(New Zealand) Hurricanes	4	1.00
3	(New Zealand) Hoskins Sotutu	(New Zealand) Blues	4	0.80
3	(New Zealand) Sio Tomkinson	(New Zealand) Highlanders	4	0.67
3	(Fiji) Suliasi Vunivalu	(Australia) Reds	4	1.00

Source: Tries

=== Discipline ===
Player	Team	Red	Yellow	Round (vs. opponent)
(New Zealand) Luke Jacobson	(New Zealand) Chiefs	1	0	Round 1 (vs. Force)
(New Zealand) Damian McKenzie	(New Zealand) Chiefs	1	0	Round 3 (vs. Reds)
(Australia) Lachlan Swinton	(Australia) Waratahs	1	0	Round 5 (vs. Chiefs)
(New Zealand) Will Jordan	(New Zealand) Crusaders	0	2	Round 2 (vs. Reds); Round 5 (vs. Rebels)
(New Zealand) Lachlan Boshier	(New Zealand) Chiefs	0	1	Round 5 (vs. Waratahs)
(New Zealand) Adrian Choat	(New Zealand) Blues	0	1	Round 1 (vs. Rebels)
(Australia) Steve Cummins	(Australia) Rebels	0	1	Round 5 (vs. Crusaders)
(Australia) Filipo Daugunu	(Australia) Reds	0	1	Round 5 (vs. Hurricanes)
(New Zealand) Ash Dixon	(New Zealand) Highlanders	0	1	Final (vs. Blues)
(South Africa) Cabous Eloff	(Australia) Rebels	0	1	Round 2 (vs. Hurricanes)
(New Zealand) Ere Enari	(New Zealand) Crusaders	0	1	Round 1 (vs. Brumbies)
(Australia) Folau Fainga'a	(Australia) Brumbies	0	1	Round 3 (vs. Blues)
(New Zealand) Bryn Hall	(New Zealand) Crusaders	0	1	Round 5 (vs. Rebels)
(New Zealand) Billy Harmon	(New Zealand) Highlanders	0	1	Round 3 (vs. Rebels)
(New Zealand) David Havili	(New Zealand) Crusaders	0	1	Round 3 (vs. Waratahs)
(Australia) Bryce Hegarty	(Australia) Reds	0	1	Round 5 (vs. Hurricanes)
(Australia) Greg Holmes	(Australia) Force	0	1	Round 2 (vs. Highlanders)
(Australia) Harry Hoopert	(Australia) Reds	0	1	Round 2 (vs. Crusaders)
(Ireland) Oliver Jager	(New Zealand) Crusaders	0	1	Round 3 (vs. Waratahs)
(Australia) Harry Johnson-Holmes	(Australia) Waratahs	0	1	Round 2 (vs. Blues)
(New Zealand) Du'Plessis Kirifi	(New Zealand) Hurricanes	0	1	Round 4 (vs. Brumbies)
(New Zealand) Tyrel Lomax	(New Zealand) Hurricanes	0	1	Round 5 (vs. Reds)
(New Zealand) Anton Lienert-Brown	(New Zealand) Chiefs	0	1	Round 1 (vs. Force)
(Samoa) Ray Niuia	(New Zealand) Blues	0	1	Round 5 (vs. Force)
(England) Jordan Olowofela	(Australia) Force	0	1	Round 1 (vs. Chiefs)
(Australia) Brandon Paenga-Amosa	(Australia) Reds	0	1	Round 4 (vs. Blues)
(Australia) Darcy Swain	(Australia) Brumbies	0	1	Round 2 (vs. Chiefs)
(Samoa) Chase Tiatia	(New Zealand) Chiefs	0	1	Round 3 (vs. Reds)
(Australia) Jordan Uelese	(Australia) Rebels	0	1	Round 3 (vs. Highlanders)
(New Zealand) Tupou Vaa'i	(New Zealand) Chiefs	0	1	Round 5 (vs. Waratahs)
(New Zealand) Nathan Vella	(New Zealand) Crusaders	0	1	Round 3 (vs. Waratahs)
(New Zealand) Jack Whetton	(Australia) Waratahs	0	1	Round 3 (vs. Crusaders)

== Squads ==
The following squads have been named. Players listed in italics denote non-original squad members.

Blues squad
Forwards	Adrian Choat • Gerard Cowley-Tuioti • Sam Darry • Kurt Eklund • Blake Gibson • Josh Goodhue • Alex Hodgman • Dillon Hunt • Akira Ioane • Nepo Laulala • James Lay • Ray Niuia • Dalton Papalii • Jacob Pierce • Taine Plumtree • Marcel Renata • Tom Robinson • Hoskins Sotutu • Karl Tu'inukuafe • Patrick Tuipulotu • Ofa Tu'ungafasi • Soane Vikena
Backs	Otere Black • Finlay Christie • Caleb Clarke • TJ Faiane • Bryce Heem • Rieko Ioane • AJ Lam • Jone Macilai-Tori • Emoni Narawa • Sam Nock • Stephen Perofeta • Harry Plummer • Jacob Ratumaitavuki-Kneepkens • Jonathan Ruru • Zarn Sullivan • Mark Tele'a • Tanielu Teleʻa
Coach	Leon MacDonald

Brumbies squad
Forwards	Allan Alaalatoa • Jahrome Brown • Tom Cusack • Folau Fainga'a • Nick Frost • Archer Holz • Tom Hooper • Sefo Kautai • Harry Lloyd • Lachlan Lonergan • Connal McInerney • Will Miller • Cadeyrn Neville • Billy Pollard • Luke Reimer • Tom Ross • Pete Samu • Rory Scott • Scott Sio • James Slipper • Darcy Swain • Henry Stowers • James Tucker • Rob Valetini
Backs	Lachlan Albert • Tom Banks • Issak Fines • Mack Hansen • Len Ikitau • Solomone Kata • Bayley Kuenzle • Noah Lolesio • Ryan Lonergan • Andy Muirhead • Reesjan Pasitoa • Irae Simone • Reece Tapine • Nic White • Tom Wright
Coach	Dan McKellar

Chiefs squad
Forwards	Naitoa Ah Kuoi • Joe Apikotoa • Kaylum Boshier • Lachlan Boshier • Mitchell Brown • Sam Cane • Tom Florence • Nathan Harris • Luke Jacobson • Zane Kapeli • Mitchell Karpik • Josh Lord • Sione Mafileo • Laghlan McWhannell • Liam Messam • Atu Moli • Ollie Norris • Reuben O'Neill • Simon Parker • Aidan Ross • Bradley Slater • Pita Gus Sowakula • Angus Ta'avao • Samisoni Taukei'aho • Viliami Taulani • Tupou Vaa'i
Backs	Bryn Gatland • Anton Lienert-Brown • Jonah Lowe • Damian McKenzie • Etene Nanai-Seturo • Alex Nankivell • Rameka Poihipi • Rivez Reihana • Xavier Roe • Shaun Stevenson • Bailyn Sullivan • Te Toiroa Tahuriorangi • Chase Tiatia • Kaleb Trask • Quinn Tupaea • Sean Wainui • Brad Weber
Coach	Clayton McMillan

Crusaders squad
Forwards	Michael Alaalatoa • Liam Allen • Scott Barrett • Ethan Blackadder • George Bower • Tom Christie • Whetu Douglas • Mitchell Dunshea • Cullen Grace • Sione Havili • Oliver Jager • Quentin MacDonald • Andrew Makalio • Brodie McAlister • Joe Moody • Fletcher Newell • Brendon O'Connor • Luke Romano • Tom Sanders • Quinten Strange • Codie Taylor • Isi Tu'ungafasi • Nathan Vella • Sam Whitelock • Tamaiti Williams
Backs	George Bridge • Fergus Burke • Brett Cameron • Mitchell Drummond • Ere Enari • Braydon Ennor • Leicester Fainga'anuku • Chay Fihaki • Jack Goodhue • Bryn Hall • David Havili • Will Jordan • Manasa Mataele • Josh McKay • Dallas McLeod • Richie Mo'unga • Isaiah Punivai • Sevu Reece
Coach	Scott Robertson

Force squad
Forwards	Bo Abra • Tim Anstee • Ollie Callan • Victor Harris • Chris Heiberg • Greg Holmes • Feleti Kaitu'u • Kane Koteka • Fergus Lee-Warner • Tomás Lezana • Kieran Longbottom • Ryan McCauley • Santiago Medrano • Jackson Pugh • Andrew Ready • Tom Robertson • Brynard Stander • Jeremy Thrush • Sitaleki Timani • Angus Wagner • Jack Winchester
Backs	Marcel Brache • Tomás Cubelli • Kyle Godwin • Richard Kahui • Rob Kearney • Tevita Kuridrani • Brad Lacey • Jono Lance • Grason Makara • Michael McDonald • Jack McGregor • Jake McIntyre • Domingo Miotti • Jordan Olowofela • Jonah Placid • Ian Prior • Toni Pulu • Byron Ralston • Jake Strachan • Henry Taefu
Coach	Tim Sampson

Highlanders squad
Forwards	Jermaine Ainsley • Teariki Ben-Nicholas • Liam Coltman • Ethan de Groot • Josh Dickson • Ash Dixon • Bryn Evans • Shannon Frizell • Billy Harmon • Kazuki Himeno • Josh Hohneck • Ricky Jackson • Ayden Johnstone • James Lentjes • Daniel Lienert-Brown • Marino Mikaele-Tu'u • Sione Misiloi • Pari Pari Parkinson • Hugh Renton • Manaaki Selby-Rickit • Liam Squire • Jeff Thwaites • Siate Tokolahi
Backs	Solomon Alaimalo • James Arscott • Michael Collins • Folau Fakatava • Connor Garden-Bachop • Sam Gilbert • Scott Gregory • Kayne Hammington • Mitchell Hunt • Josh Ioane • Vilimoni Koroi • Nehe Milner-Skudder • Josh Moorby • Jona Nareki • Tim O'Malley • Fetuli Paea • Ngane Punivai • Aaron Smith • Josh Timu • Sio Tomkinson • Thomas Umaga-Jensen
Coach	Clarke Dermody

Hurricanes squad
Forwards	Fraser Armstrong • Asafo Aumua • James Blackwell • Dane Coles • Gareth Evans • Alex Fidow • Vaea Fifita • Devan Flanders • Brayden Iose • Du'Plessis Kirifi • Kane Le'aupepe • Tyrel Lomax • Tevita Mafileo • Liam Mitchell • Xavier Numia • Reed Prinsep • Pouri Rakete-Stones • Ricky Riccitelli • Ardie Savea • Scott Scrafton • Isaia Walker-Leawere
Backs	Vince Aso • Jordie Barrett • Jamie Booth • Luke Campbell • Jackson Garden-Bachop • Wes Goosen • Simon Hickey • Ngani Laumape • Orbyn Leger • Ruben Love • Pepesana Patafilo • Billy Proctor • Salesi Rayasi • Cameron Roigard • Julian Savea • Jonathan Taumateine • Danny Toala • Peter Umaga-Jensen • Lolagi Visinia
Coach	Jason Holland

Rebels squad
Forwards	Albert Anae • Ignacio Calas • Ed Craig • Steve Cummins • Cabous Eloff • Pone Fa'amausili • Matt Gibbon • James Hanson • Richard Hardwick • Ross Haylett-Petty • Trevor Hosea • Michael Icely • Isaac Aedo Kailea • Josh Kemeny • Rob Leota • Isi Naisarani • Cameron Orr • Jeral Skelton • Lucio Sordoni • Jordan Uelese • Rhys van Nek • Michael Wells • Brad Wilkin
Backs	Lachie Anderson • Carter Gordon • Dane Haylett-Petty • Reece Hodge • Lewis Holland • Stacey Ili • Andrew Kellaway • Marika Koroibete • Frank Lomani • Campbell Magnay • Tom Pincus • Joe Powell • Theo Strang • Matt To'omua • James Tuttle • Glen Vaihu • Ilikena Vudogo • Young Tonumaipea • George Worth
Coach	Kevin Foote

Reds squad
Forwards	Richie Asiata • Angus Blyth • Matt Faessler • Feao Fotuaika • Ben Grant • Harry Hoopert • Alex Mafi • Fraser McReight • Josh Nasser • Zane Nonggorr • Brandon Paenga-Amosa • Lukhan Salakaia-Loto • Angus Scott-Young • Ryan Smith • Tuaina Taii Tualima • Taniela Tupou • Seru Uru • Sam Wallis • Harry Wilson • Liam Wright • Dane Zander
Backs	Jock Campbell • Hudson Creighton • Lawson Creighton • Filipo Daugunu • Ilaisa Droasese • Josh Flook • Mac Grealy • Bryce Hegarty • Isaac Henry • Tate McDermott • James O'Connor • Hunter Paisami • Jordan Petaia • Moses Sorovi • Hamish Stewart • Kalani Thomas • Suliasi Vunivalu
Coach	Brad Thorn

Waratahs squad
Forwards	Robbie Abel • Angus Bell • Darcy Breen • Sam Caird • Joe Cotton • Pekahou Cowan • Jack Dempsey • Max Douglas • Tetera Faulkner • Vunipola Fifita • Charlie Gamble • Will Harris • Tom Horton • Harry Johnson-Holmes • Dave Porecki • Hugh Sinclair • Lachlan Swinton • Chris Talakai • Alefosio Tatola • Tiaan Tauakipulu • Carlo Tizzano • Andrew Tuala • Rahboni Warren-Vosayaco • Jack Whetton • Jeremy Williams • Sam Wykes
Backs	Ben Donaldson • Tane Edmed • Lalakai Foketi • Jake Gordon • Jack Grant • Will Harrison • Jack Maddocks • Tepai Moeroa • Mark Nawaqanitawase • Alex Newsome • Izaia Perese • James Ramm • Triston Reilly • Henry Robertson • James Turner • Joey Walton
Coach	Jason Gilmore • Chris Whitaker

== Referees ==
The following referees were selected to officiate Super Rugby Trans-Tasman:

Super Rugby Trans-Tasman referees
Australia	Nic Berry • Graham Cooper • Angus Gardner • Damon Murphy • Amy Perrett • Jordan Way
New Zealand	James Doleman • Mike Fraser • Ben O'Keeffe • Brendon Pickerill • Paul Williams

== Media coverage ==
=== Television ===
In Australia, all games were broadcast live on streaming service Stan Sport, with a select game each round simulcast live free-to-air on the Nine Network. Sky Sport aired the competition in New Zealand.

Overseas, the following broadcasters showed Super Rugby Trans-Tasman:

Broadcaster	Country(ies)
Canal+	France (Switzerland) Romandy
Digicel	Cook Islands; Fiji; Papua New Guinea; Samoa; Solomon Islands; Tonga; Tuvalu; Vanuatu
ESPN; ESPN Argentina; ESPN International	Argentina; Bolivia; Brazil; Chile; Colombia; Ecuador; Guyana; Paraguay; Peru; Suriname; United States; Uruguay; Venezuela
Premier Sports	Brunei; Cambodia; East Timor; Indonesia; Laos; Malaysia; Myanmar; Philippines; Singapore; Thailand; Vietnam
RugbyPass	Afghanistan; Albania; Alderney; Andorra; Armenia; Austria; Azerbaijan; Bahrain; Bangladesh; Belarus; Belgium; Bhutan; Bosnia and Herzegovina; Bulgaria; China; Croatia; Cyprus; Czech Republic; Denmark; England; Estonia; Federated States of Micronesia; Finland; Gaza Strip; Georgia; Germany; Greece; Guam; Guernsey; Herm; Hong Kong; Hungary; Iceland; India; Iran; Iraq; Ireland; Isle of Man; Israel; Italy; Jersey; Jordan; Kazakhstan; Kingdom of Saudi Arabia; Kiribati; Kosovo; Kuwait; Kyrgyzstan; Latvia; Lebanon; Liechtenstein; Lithuania; Luxembourg; Macau; Maldives; Malta; Marshall Islands; Moldova; Monaco; Mongolia; Montenegro; Nepal; Netherlands; North Korea; North Macedonia; Northern Ireland; Northern Marianas; Norway; Oman; Pakistan; Palau; Palestine; Poland; Portugal; Qatar; Romania; Russia; San Marino; Sark; Scotland; Serbia; Slovakia; Slovenia; South Korea; Sri Lanka; Sweden; Taiwan; Tajikistan; Ticino; Turkey; Ukraine; United Arab Emirates; Vatican City; Wales; West Bank; Yemen
Sky Italia	Italy
SuperSport	South Africa
Telefónica	Spain
TSN	Canada
Wowow	Japan

== See also ==
- Super Rugby
- Super Rugby AU
- Super Rugby Aotearoa
- Super Rugby Unlocked
