= Connal =

Connal is both a surname and a given name. Notable people with the name include:

- Graeme Connal (born 1969), Scottish curler
- Connal Trueman (born 1996), English footballer
- Connal McInerney (born 1995), Australian rugby union player
