= Joe Powell (rugby union) =

Australia international rugby union player

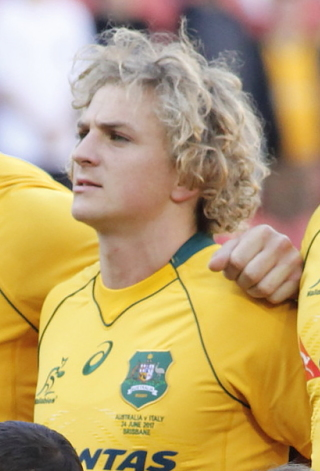
- Born: 11 April 1994 (age 32) Canberra, ACT, Australia
- Height: 1.77 m (5 ft 10 in)
- Weight: 83 kg (13 st 1 lb; 183 lb)
- School: Marist College Canberra
- Notable relative: Katrina Powell (cousin)

Rugby union career
- Position: Scrum-half
Senior career
Years	Team	Apps	(Points)
2014–2019	Canberra Vikings	38	(26)
2015–2020	Brumbies	73	(45)
2021–2022	Rebels	27	(15)
2022–2023	London Irish	17	(5)
2023	Leicester Tigers	8	(10)
- Correct as of 1 January 2024
International career
Years	Team	Apps	(Points)
2014	Australia U20		
2017	Australia	4	(0)
- Correct as of 23 June 2018

Joe Powell (born 11 April 1994) is an Australian rugby union scrum-half who is currently playing for Montauban in the French Top 14 league. He formerly played for Leicester Tigers in Premiership Rugby, the top tier of English rugby union. He previously played for London Irish, Canberra Vikings and the ACT Brumbies. He was a member of the Brumbies extended playing squad, making his first appearances for the franchise during the 2015 Super Rugby season.

Powell was a member of the Australian schoolboys shadow squad in 2012 and was part of the Australia under-20 side which competed in the 2014 IRB Junior World Championship in New Zealand. In 2016, he was selected in the 39-man Australian squad for the Test series against England.

Powell was the starting scrumhalf in the Brumbies 28–23 grand final victory over the Queensland Reds to claim the 2020 Super Rugby AU title.

Powell signed for the Melbourne Rebels on a two-year deal from the 2021 season.

Powell is of Irish descent and holds dual Australian and Irish citizenship.

Powell joined Leicester Tigers on 4 July 2023. After making 8 appearances Powell was released on 4 January 2024.

== Super Rugby statistics ==
As of 30 May 2022

Season	Team	Games	Starts	Sub	Mins	Tries	Cons	Pens	Drops	Points	Yel	Red
2015	Brumbies	3	0	3	15	0	0	0	0	0	0	0
2016	Brumbies	8	1	7	175	0	0	0	0	0	0	0
2017	Brumbies	15	15	0	1063	1	0	0	0	5	0	0
2018	Brumbies	16	14	2	921	2	0	0	0	10	0	0
2019	Brumbies	18	17	1	1165	2	0	0	0	10	0	0
2020	Brumbies	6	5	1	330	2	0	0	0	10	0	0
2020 AU	Brumbies	7	7	0	432	2	0	0	0	10	0	0
2021 AU	Rebels	8	8	0	612	2	0	0	0	10	0	0
2021 TT	Rebels	5	5	0	313	1	0	0	0	5	0	0
2022	Rebels	14	6	8	562	0	0	0	0	0	0	0
Total		100	78	22	5,589	12	0	0	0	60	0	0
