= Tuaina Taii Tualima =

Australian rugby union player

- Born: 1 June 1997 (age 29) Auckland, New Zealand
- Height: 193 cm (6 ft 4 in)
- Weight: 110 kg (243 lb; 17 st 5 lb)
- School: Brisbane State High School

Rugby union career
- Position(s): Lock, Flanker
- Current team: ACT Brumbies, Auckland
Senior career
Years	Team	Apps	(Points)
2016–2019	Brisbane City	11	(5)
2020–2022	Reds	12	(5)
2023–2024	Rebels	23	(5)
2024	Auckland	9	(5)
2025–2026	ACT Brumbies	14	(5)
- Correct as of 14 June 2025
International career
Years	Team	Apps	(Points)
2025	First Nations & Pasifika XV	1	(0)
- Correct as of 22 July 2025
Medal record
Boy's rugby sevens
Representing Australia
Commonwealth Youth Games
Silver medal – second place	2015 Apia	Team competition

Tuaina Taii Tualima (born 1 June 1997 in New Zealand) is an Australian rugby union player, who currently plays as a lock or flanker for the ACT Brumbies in Super Rugby and for Auckland in New Zealand's domestic National Provincial Championship competition. He previously played for the Reds and Rebels.

== Super Rugby statistics ==
As of 3 June 2023

Season	Team	Games	Starts	Sub	Mins	Tries	Cons	Pens	Drops	Points	Yel	Red
2020	Reds	0	0	0	0	0	0	0	0	0	0	0
2020 AU	Reds	8	0	8	131	1	0	0	0	5	0	0
2021 AU	Reds	1	0	1	6	0	0	0	0	0	0	0
2021 TT	Reds	0	0	0	0	0	0	0	0	0	0	0
2022	Reds	3	1	2	97	0	0	0	0	0	0	1
2023	Rebels	8	5	3	363	0	0	0	0	0	0	0
Total		20	6	14	597	1	0	0	0	5	0	1

== Personal life ==
Tualima is of Samoan heritage.
