= Ignacio Calas =

Argentine rugby union player

- Full name: Ignacio Calas
- Born: 18 March 1996 (age 30) Argentina
- Height: 6 ft 7 in (2.01 m)
- Weight: 264 lb (120 kg; 18 st 12 lb)

Rugby union career
- Position: Lock
Senior career
Years	Team	Apps	(Points)
2016–2018	La Tablada	9	(10)
2019	Jaguares XV	8	
2021–	Carcassonne		
- Correct as of 21 October 2021
Super Rugby
Years	Team	Apps	(Points)
2020	Jaguares	0	(0)
2021	Rebels	0	(0)
- Correct as of 21 October 2021

Ignacio Calas (born 18 March 1996) is an Argentine rugby union player who plays for the Jaguares. On 21 November 2019, he was named in the Jaguares squad for the 2020 Super Rugby season.

== Super Rugby statistics ==
As of 12 June 2021

Season	Team	Games	Starts	Sub	Mins	Tries	Cons	Pens	Drops	Points	Yel	Red
2020	Jaguares	0	0	0	0	0	0	0	0	0	0	0
2021 AU	Rebels	0	0	0	0	0	0	0	0	0	0	0
2021 TT	Rebels	0	0	0	0	0	0	0	0	0	0	0
Total		0	0	0	0	0	0	0	0	0	0	0
