= Matt Gibbon =

Australian rugby union player

- Born: 3 June 1995 (age 31) Lismore, New South Wales, Australia
- Height: 184 cm (6 ft 0 in)
- Weight: 119 kg (18 st 10 lb; 262 lb)
- Notable relative: Alex Gibbon (brother)

Rugby union career
- Position: Prop
Senior career
Years	Team	Apps	(Points)
2015–2016	Greater Sydney Rams	10	(5)
2017–2018	NSW Country Eagles	12	(5)
2019	Melbourne Rising	7	(5)
Super Rugby
Years	Team	Apps	(Points)
2019–2024.	Rebels	75	(20)
2025	Reds	0	(0)
- Correct as of 8 June 2024
International career
Years	Team	Apps	(Points)
2022–2023	Australia A	3	(0)
2022–2023	Australia	6	(0)

Matt Gibbon (born 3 June 1995) is a retired Australian rugby union player who most recently played for the Reds in the Super Rugby competition, having previously played for Rebels. His position of choice is prop.

== Super Rugby statistics ==
As of 3 June 2023

Season	Team	Games	Starts	Sub	Mins	Tries	Cons	Pens	Drops	Points	Yel	Red
2019	Rebels	16	4	12	466	0	0	0	0	0	1	0
2020	Rebels	5	5	0	331	0	0	0	0	0	0	0
2020 AU	Rebels	5	2	3	154	0	0	0	0	0	0	0
2021 AU	Rebels	5	1	4	139	1	0	0	0	5	0	0
2021 TT	Rebels	5	0	5	118	1	0	0	0	5	0	0
2022	Rebels	12	7	5	546	0	0	0	0	0	0	0
2023	Rebels	14	13	1	765	2	0	0	0	10	0	0
Total		62	32	30	2,519	4	0	0	0	20	1	0
