= Tom Pincus =

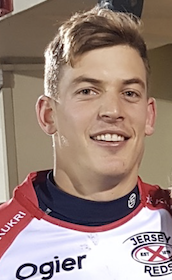
- Born: Thomas Pincus; 28 May 1992 (age 34) Brisbane, Queensland, Australia
- Height: 1.91 m (6 ft 3 in)
- Weight: 97 kg (15 st 4 lb)
- Notable relative: Joe Pincus (brother)

Rugby union career
- Position: Wing / Fullback
Amateur team(s)
Years	Team	Apps	(Points)
2014–2016	University of Queensland		
2016–2017	Eastern Suburbs	10	(114)
Senior career
Years	Team	Apps	(Points)
2014–2016	Queensland Country	15	(32)
2017–2018	Jersey Reds	28	(72)
2018–2020	Bristol	18	(55)
2020-	Melbourne Rebels	13	(5)
Super Rugby
Years	Team	Apps	(Points)
2020–2021	Rebels	13	(5)

Tom Pincus (born 28 May 1992) is an Australian professional rugby player currently playing for Melbourne Rebels in Super Rugby, generally playing as a wing. Pincus also operates as a Fullback and is recognized for his kicking ability. Originally from Brisbane, Queensland, Pincus is a Gold Coast native and moved to Sydney, New South Wales to play rugby in 2016.

== Rugby career ==
Pincus kicked a backheel conversion during the Darwin 7s tournament in 2015. However, Pincus' team lost in the final 21–14 to ERC Borneo Eagles.

Pincus has played as a wing, fly-half and fullback.

=== Jersey Reds ===
In May 2017, Pincus signed for the Jersey Reds of the English RFU Championship. Pincus, a qualified lawyer, committed to playing professional full-time rugby after playing rugby at Eastern Suburbs and Queensland Country.

=== Bristol Bears ===
In mid-2018 Pincus, along with fellow Australian and Wallaby great, George Smith, signed for newly-promoted team the Bristol Bears of the Premiership.

=== Rebels ===
In February 2020 Pincus was signed by Super Rugby side Melbourne Rebels with immediate effect.

== Super Rugby statistics ==
As of 12 June 2021

Season	Team	Games	Starts	Sub	Mins	Tries	Cons	Pens	Drops	Points	Yel	Red
2020	Rebels	0	0	0	0	0	0	0	0	0	0	0
2020 AU	Rebels	3	2	1	149	1	0	0	0	5	1	0
2021 AU	Rebels	8	7	1	528	0	0	0	0	0	0	0
2021 TT	Rebels	2	1	1	51	0	0	0	0	0	0	0
Total		13	10	3	728	1	0	0	0	5	1	0
