= Theo Strang =

Australian rugby union player

- Born: 21 May 1997 (age 29) Australia
- Height: 180 cm (5 ft 11 in)
- Weight: 88 kg (194 lb; 13 st 12 lb)

Rugby union career
- Position: Scrum-half
Senior career
Years	Team	Apps	(Points)
2015	Sydney Stars	0	(0)
2019	Panasonic Wild Knights	2	(0)
2019	Melbourne Rising	6	(0)
2021–2022	Bristol Bears		
- Correct as of 21 July 2021
Super Rugby
Years	Team	Apps	(Points)
2020–2021	Rebels	4	(0)
- Correct as of 21 July 2021

Theo Strang (born 21 May 1997 in Australia) is an Australian rugby union player who is currently playing for Sydney University Football Club . He previously played for the Rebels in Super Rugby & Bristol Bears in Premiership Rugby. His playing position is scrum-half. He was announced in the Rebels squad for round 1 in 2020.

== Super Rugby statistics ==
As of 12 June 2021

Season	Team	Games	Starts	Sub	Mins	Tries	Cons	Pens	Drops	Points	Yel	Red
2020	Rebels	3	0	3	13	0	0	0	0	0	0	0
2020 AU	Rebels	1	0	1	8	0	0	0	0	0	0	0
2021 AU	Rebels	0	0	0	0	0	0	0	0	0	0	0
2021 TT	Rebels	0	0	0	0	0	0	0	0	0	0	0
Total		4	0	4	21	0	0	0	0	0	0	0
