= Declan Moore (rugby union) =

Australian rugby union player

- Born: 15 September 1996 (age 30) New Zealand
- Height: 1.84 m (6 ft 1/2 in)
- Weight: 112 kg (17.6 st; 247 lb)

Rugby union career
- Position: Hooker
- Current team: Anthem Rugby Carolina
Senior career
Years	Team	Apps	(Points)
2015–2021	Sydney University	46	(135)
2015	Sydney Stars	3	(0)
2019	Sydney	7	(5)
2020	Rebels	0	(0)
2021–2022	Munster	1	(0)
2021–2022	→ Ulster (loan)	2	(5)
2022–	Ulster	1	(5)
2023	→ Connacht loan	0	(0)
2024	Anthem Rugby Carolina	0	(0)
- Correct as of 4 February 2024
International career
Years	Team	Apps	(Points)
2016	Australia U20	0	(0)
- Correct as of 14 September 2021

Declan Moore (born 15 September 1996) is a New Zealand-born, Australian rugby union player who plays for Anthem Rugby Carolina in Major League Rugby (MLR). He plays as a hooker.

Born in New Zealand, Moore moved to Australia at a young age. He has played most of his senior rugby for Sydney University in the Shute Shield, also representing Sydney during the 2019 National Rugby Championship. Super Rugby club Melbourne Rebels selected Moore in their squad for the 2020 Super Rugby season and the 2020 Super Rugby AU season, but he made no appearances for the club during these competitions. Moore was also selected for the Australian under-20s squad, though injury denied him any caps.

Moore joined Irish United Rugby Championship and Champions Cup club Munster on a deal for the 2021–22 season in September 2021. Moore's paternal grandfather is from Carrickfergus, County Antrim, and he has maternal relatives from Castlerea, County Roscommon, meaning Moore is Irish-qualified and therefore eligible to represent Ireland's national team. He made his senior competitive debut for the province in their opening 2021–22 Champions Cup fixture away to English club Wasps on 12 December 2021, coming on as a replacement for Scott Buckley in the province's 35–14 win.

Moore joined Munster's provincial rivals Ulster to provide injury cover in late December 2021 and on loan in February 2022, and he will join Ulster permanently from the 2022–23 season. He made his debut for Ulster in their rescheduled 2021–22 United Rugby Championship round 8 fixture at home to provincial rivals Connacht on 4 February 2022, scoring a try in their 32–12 win. In April 2022 it was announced he would move to Connacht on a season-long loan.

On 2 February 2024, Moore was named in the Anthem Rugby Carolina squad for the 2024 Major League Rugby season.
