= Isi Naisarani =

Fijian-born Australian rugby union player (born 1995)

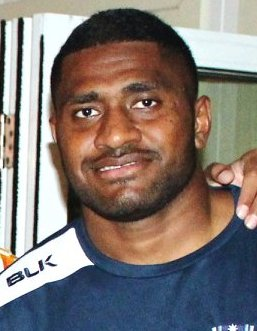
- Naisarani in 2018
- Born: Isireli Naisarani; 14 February 1995 (age 31) Naqali, Naitasiri, Fiji
- Height: 1.95 m (6 ft 5 in)
- Weight: 110 kg (240 lb; 17 st 5 lb)
- School: Ratu Kadavulevu School

Rugby union career
- Position: Flanker / No. 8 / Lock
Amateur team(s)
Years	Team	Apps	(Points)
2015–2016	Souths Rugby		
Senior career
Years	Team	Apps	(Points)
2016	Brisbane City	7	(30)
2017	Perth Spirit	8	(15)
2018–2019	Melbourne Rising	7	(10)
2022–2023	Shizuoka Blue Revs	7	(10)
2025–2026	Tokyo Gas Rugby Club	9	(20)
- Correct as of 20 April 2023
Super Rugby
Years	Team	Apps	(Points)
2017	Western Force	15	(5)
2018	ACT Brumbies	15	(25)
2019–2021	Melbourne Rebels	31	(40)
2023	Western Force	4	(0)
- Correct as of 23 October 2023
International career
Years	Team	Apps	(Points)
2019-21	Australia	11	(0)
- Correct as of 17 July 2021

Isi Naisarani (born 14 February 1995) is a professional rugby union player who represents Australia in international rugby. He is currently signed with the Western Force. He first played Super Rugby for the Western Force in 2017, before joining the Brumbies and Rebels. In 2021, he moved to Japan to play for Shizuoka Blue Revs. His usual position is No. 8. Born in Fiji, he qualified for Australia by residency.

== Super Rugby statistics ==
As of 12 June 2021

Season	Team	Apps	Start	Sub	Mins	T	C	PG	DG	Pts	YC	RC
2017	Force	15	10	5	876	1	0	0	0	5	2	0
2018	Brumbies	15	15	0	1060	5	0	0	0	25	0	0
2019	Rebels	13	13	0	1032	1	0	0	0	5	0	0
2020	Rebels	6	6	0	480	2	0	0	0	10	0	0
2020 AU	Rebels	6	6	0	478	3	0	0	0	15	1	0
2021 AU	Rebels	2	1	1	101	0	0	0	0	0	0	1
2021 TT	Rebels	4	4	0	274	2	0	0	0	10	0	0
Total		61	55	6	4301	14	0	0	0	70	3	1
