= Cabous Eloff =

South African rugby union player

- Born: Jacobus Johannes Cabous Eloff; 30 July 1998 (age 28) South Africa
- Height: 1.93 m (6 ft 4 in)
- Weight: 124 kg (19 st 7 lb)
- School: Afrikaanse Hoër Seunskool

Rugby union career
- Position: Prop
- Current team: Rebels
Senior career
Years	Team	Apps	(Points)
2018	Blue Bulls XV	1	(0)
2025-	Western Province		
- Correct as of 14 February 2020
Super Rugby
Years	Team	Apps	(Points)
2020–2024	Rebels	49	(30)
- Correct as of 8 June 2024

Jacobus Johannes Cabous Eloff (born 30 July 1998) is a South African rugby union player who last played for the Rebels in Super Rugby. His playing position is prop.

He signed for the Rebels squad in 2020.

He joined Western Province in 2025 for the Currie Cup season.

== Super Rugby statistics ==
As of 3 June 2023

Season	Team	Games	Starts	Sub	Mins	Tries	Cons	Pens	Drops	Points	Yel	Red
2020	Rebels	4	0	4	82	0	0	0	0	0	0	0
2020 AU	Rebels	6	0	6	82	1	0	0	0	5	0	0
2021 AU	Rebels	8	7	1	483	0	0	0	0	0	0	0
2021 TT	Rebels	5	5	0	300	1	0	0	0	5	1	0
2022	Rebels	14	10	4	753	4	0	0	0	20	0	0
2023	Rebels	8	2	6	230	0	0	0	0	0	1	0
2024	Rebels	-	-	-	-	-	-	-	-	-	-	-
Total		45	24	21	1,904	6	0	0	0	30	2	0
