= Josh Kemeny =

Australian rugby union player

- Born: 29 November 1998 (age 27) Australia
- Height: 193 cm (6 ft 4 in)
- Weight: 110 kg (240 lb; 17 st 5 lb)
- School: Cranbrook School, Sydney

Rugby union career
- Position: Flanker
Senior career
Years	Team	Apps	(Points)
2018–2019	Sydney	8	(0)
2024–	Northampton Saints	23	(30)
- Correct as of 17 October 2025
Super Rugby
Years	Team	Apps	(Points)
2020–2024	Rebels	39	(25)
- Correct as of 8 June 2024
International career
Years	Team	Apps	(Points)
2023	Australia	2	(0)

Josh Kemeny (born 29 November 1998) is an Australian rugby union player who plays for the Northampton Saints in the Gallagher Premiership. His playing position is flanker. He signed for the Rebels squad in 2020. Kemeny played for Sydney (NRC team) under the National Rugby Championship

On 12 February 2024, Kemeny moved to England to join Northampton Saints in the Gallagher Premiership from the 2024-25 season.

== Personal life ==
Kemeny is the nephew of Fox sports presenter Lara Pitt.

== Super Rugby statistics ==
As of 3 June 2023

Season	Team	Games	Starts	Sub	Mins	Tries	Cons	Pens	Drops	Points	Yel	Red
2020	Rebels	0	0	0	0	0	0	0	0	0	0	0
2020 AU	Rebels	5	5	0	286	0	0	0	0	0	0	0
2021 AU	Rebels	8	6	2	472	0	0	0	0	0	0	0
2021 TT	Rebels	2	2	0	160	0	0	0	0	0	0	0
2022	Rebels	0	0	0	0	0	0	0	0	0	0	0
2023	Rebels	12	11	1	890	4	0	0	0	20	0	0
Total		27	24	3	1,809	4	0	0	0	20	0	0

== Honours ==
Northampton

- Premiership Rugby: 2025–26
- European Rugby Champions Cup runner-up: 2024–25
