= Trevor Hosea =

Australian rugby union player

- Born: 24 November 1999 (age 26) Melbourne, Victoria, Australia
- Height: 204 cm (6 ft 8 in)
- Weight: 117 kg (18 st 6 lb; 258 lb)
- School: Brisbane Boys' College

Rugby union career
- Position: Lock
- Current team: Force
Amateur team(s)
Years	Team	Apps	(Points)
2015–2017	Melbourne Harlequins		
Senior career
Years	Team	Apps	(Points)
2017–2019	Melbourne Rising	3	(0)
2018–2023	Rebels	33	(5)
2023–2025	Tokyo Sungoliath	25	(5)
2025–2026	Mie Honda Heat	17	(5)
2027–	Force	0	(0)
International career
Years	Team	Apps	(Points)
2017	Australian Schoolboys		
2018	Australia U20		
Medal record
Men's rugby union
Representing Australia
Oceania U20 Championship
Winner	2019 Gold Coast
Junior World Cup
Runner-up	2019 Argentina

Trevor Hosea (born 24 November 1999) is an Australian rugby union player who plays as a lock for the Force in the Super Rugby. Hosea made his professional debut for the Melbourne Rising in the National Rugby Championship (NRC), before making his senior Super Rugby debut for the Rebels in 2018. His regular playing position is lock. Hosea previously played for the Tokyo Sungoliath and Mie Honda Heat in the Japan Rugby League One (JRLO) competition.

== Career ==
In August 2026, Hosea returned to the Super Rugby after signing a two-year deal with the Force.

== Super Rugby statistics ==
As of 3 June 2023

Season	Team	Games	Starts	Sub	Mins	Tries	Cons	Pens	Drops	Points	Yel	Red
2018	Rebels	0	0	0	0	0	0	0	0	0	0	0
2019	Rebels	0	0	0	0	0	0	0	0	0	0	0
2020	Rebels	0	0	0	0	0	0	0	0	0	0	0
2020 AU	Rebels	9	7	2	498	0	0	0	0	0	0	0
2021 AU	Rebels	7	7	0	507	0	0	0	0	0	1	0
2021 TT	Rebels	4	4	0	274	1	0	0	0	5	0	0
2022	Rebels	0	0	0	0	0	0	0	0	0	0	0
2023	Rebels	13	9	4	663	0	0	0	0	0	0	0
Total		33	27	6	1,942	1	0	0	0	5	1	0
