= Campbell Magnay =

Australian rugby union player

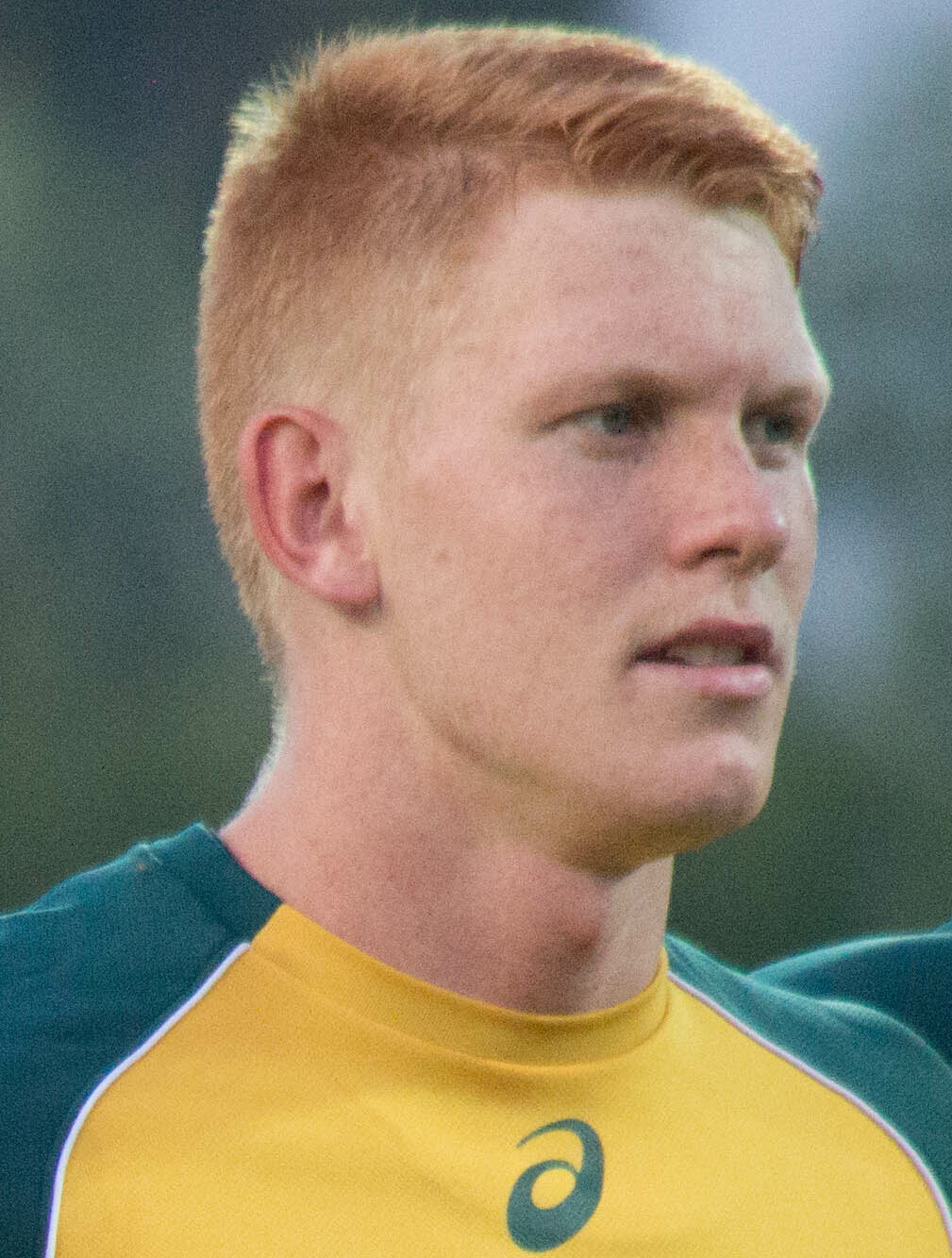
- Born: Campbell Magnay; 10 November 1996 (age 30) Brisbane, Australia
- Height: 201 cm (6 ft 7 in)
- Weight: 110 kg (17 st 5 lb)
- School: St Joseph's College, Nudgee

Rugby union career
- Position: Centre
Amateur team(s)
Years	Team	Apps	(Points)
2014-	GPS		
Senior career
Years	Team	Apps	(Points)
2017–2018	Suntory Sungoliath	5	(5)
- Correct as of 1 November 2018
Provincial / State sides
Years	Team	Apps	(Points)
2014−2016	Queensland Country	10	(10)
- Correct as of 1 November 2018
Super Rugby
Years	Team	Apps	(Points)
2015−2017	Reds	17	(10)
2019–2021	Rebels	20	(10)
- Correct as of 22 November 2021
International career
Years	Team	Apps	(Points)
2013	Australian Schoolboys	0	
2015-2016	Australia U20	5	(0)

Campbell Magnay (born 10 November 1996) is an Australian rugby union player who currently plays as a centre for the Suntory Sungoliath in the Japan Top Rugby competition. He also represented Queensland Country in the inaugural National Rugby Championship.

== Career ==
After representing Queensland and Australia at schoolboy level, Magnay was picked up by Queensland club side GPS upon completing his studies at St Joseph's College, Nudgee. His performances in the Queensland Premier Rugby competition brought him to the attention of the newly formed Queensland Country NRC side and he became the youngest player contracted to either of the two Queensland NRC squads. Such was his impact in the 6 games he played for Country in 2014, he was handed a Super Rugby contract while aged only 17 by the Brisbane-based Reds ahead of the 2015 Super Rugby season.

== Personal life ==
Magnay currently studies a Bachelor of Commerce at Deakin University. His younger brother, Will, is a basketball player.

== Super Rugby statistics ==
As of 12 June 2021

Season	Team	Games	Starts	Sub	Mins	Tries	Cons	Pens	Drops	Points	Yel	Red
2015	Reds	6	2	4	252	0	0	0	0	0	0	0
2016	Reds	6	2	4	246	1	0	0	0	5	0	0
2017	Reds	5	4	1	248	1	0	0	0	5	0	0
2019	Rebels	9	0	9	280	1	0	0	0	5	1	0
2020	Rebels	2	1	1	121	0	0	0	0	0	0	0
2020 AU	Rebels	5	4	1	324	0	0	0	0	0	0	0
2021 AU	Rebels	2	2	0	136	0	0	0	0	0	0	0
2021 TT	Rebels	2	2	0	139	1	0	0	0	5	0	0
Total		37	17	20	1746	4	0	0	0	20	1	0
