= Noah Lolesio =

Australian rugby union player (born 1999)

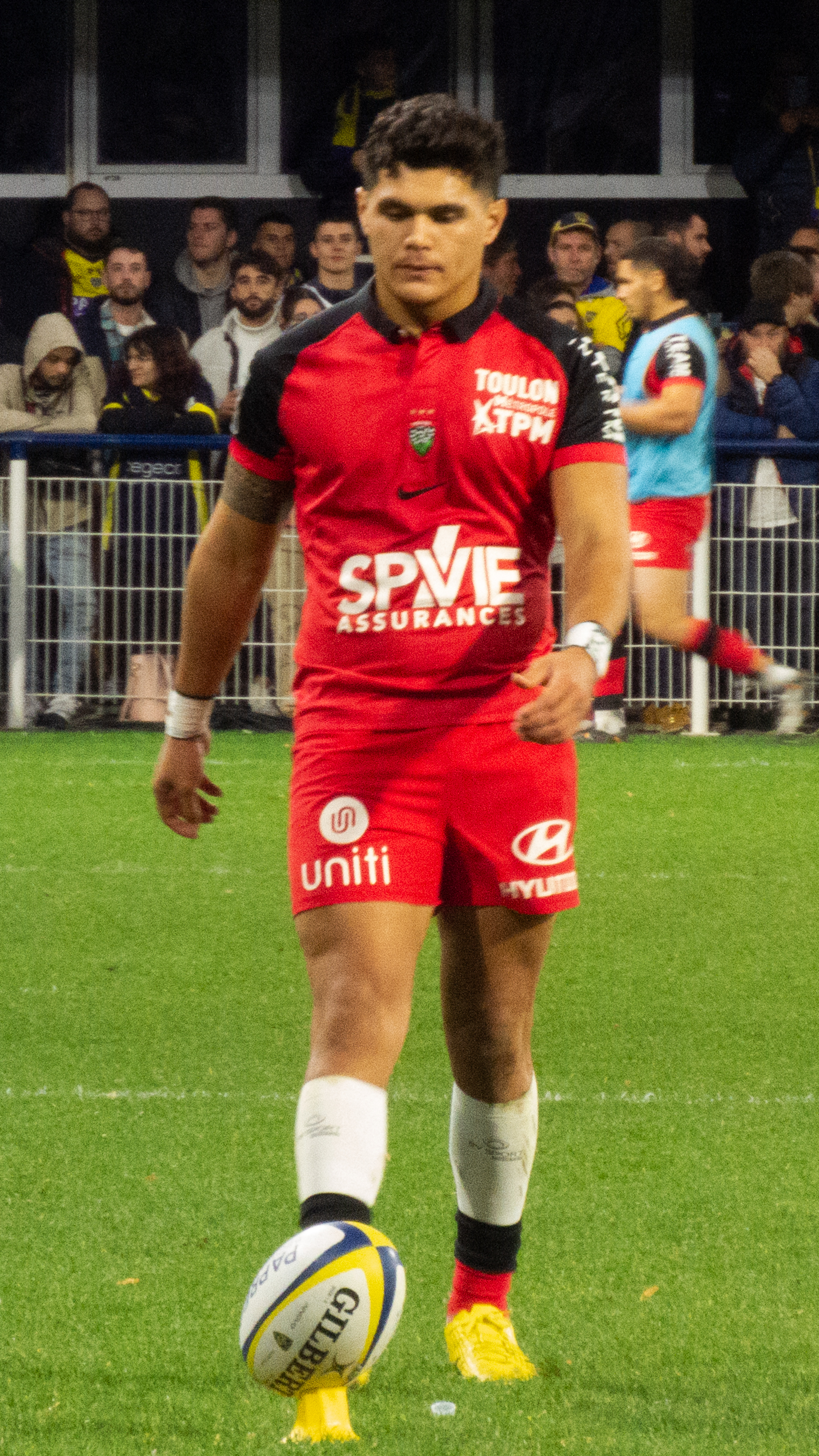
- Born: 18 December 1999 (age 26) Auckland, New Zealand
- Height: 180 cm (5 ft 11 in)
- Weight: 89 kg (196 lb; 14 st 0 lb)
- School: The Southport School

Rugby union career
- Position(s): Fly-half, Centre
- Current team: Toyota Shuttles
Senior career
Years	Team	Apps	(Points)
2018–2019	Canberra Vikings	10	(23)
2020–2025	ACT Brumbies	77	(589)
2023	Toulon	6	(20)
2025–	Toyota Shuttles	12	(165)
- Correct as of 30 May 2026
International career
Years	Team	Apps	(Points)
2019	Australia U20	5	(10)
2020–	Australia	30	(229)
- Correct as of 6 July 2025
Medal record
Men's rugby union
Representing Australia
Oceania U20 Championship
Winner	2019 Gold Coast
Junior World Cup
Runner-up	2019 Argentina

Noah Lolesio (LOW-le-SEE-ooh) (born 18 December 1999) is an Australian rugby union player who plays fly-half for Toyota Industries Shuttles Aichi in Japan Rugby League One, Division Two, and for the Australian national team.

He previously has played for the Brumbies in Super Rugby and for RC Toulon in the French Top 14.

Born in Auckland and raised on the Gold Coast, Lolesio is of Samoan and Niuean descent.

== Career ==
Lolesio graduated from The Southport School, in which he played in their first XV and signed for the Brumbies squad in 2019. He made his debut for the Brumbies at the start of the 2020 season, guiding the team to the 2020 Super Rugby AU championship after the COVID-19 pandemic ended the full competition prematurely.

In October 2020, Lolesio made his debut for the Wallabies in the third Test of the 2020 Bledisloe Cup at Stadium Australia in Sydney.

Lolesio signed a 'joker deal' with RC Toulonnais for the duration of the 2023 Rugby World Cup and re-signed with the Brumbies for 2024.

In October 2025, Lolesio signed a one-year contract with second division Japanese club Toyota Industries Shuttles Aichi. Lolesio went 7 games undefeated for his new club until a defeat to Kyushu Electric Power Kyuden Voltex in the 12th round.

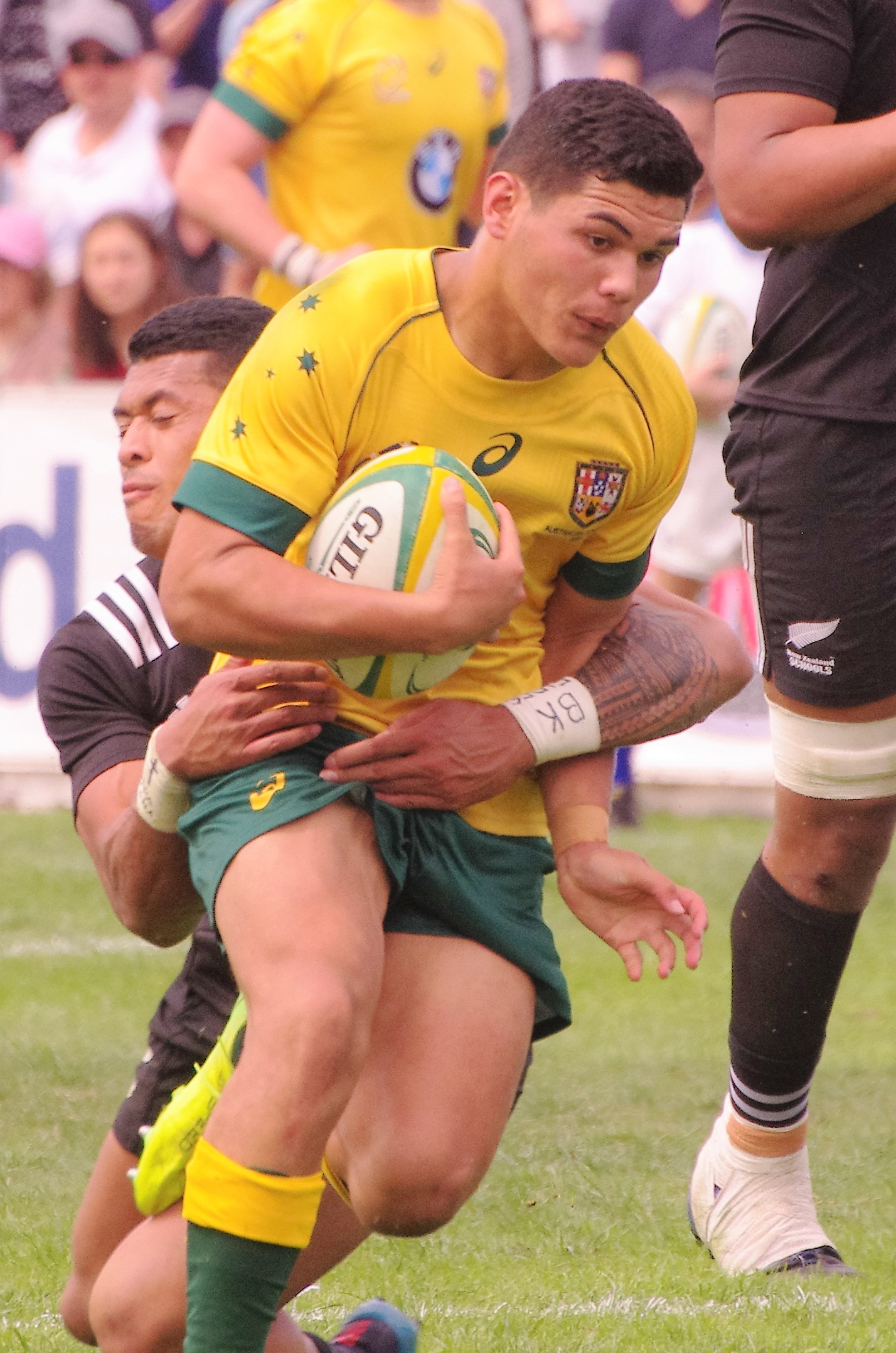
Lolesio with the Australian Schoolboys team against New Zealand Schoolboys in 2017

== Statistics ==
=== Club ===
Season	Team	Matches	Starts	Sub	Minutes	Tries	Cons	Pens	Drops	Points	YC	RC
2020	ACT Brumbies	9	9	0	621	0	18	3	2	51	0	0
2021	ACT Brumbies	14	14	0	1040	2	32	10	0	104	0	0
2022	ACT Brumbies	12	12	0	886	1	28	18	1	118	0	0
2023	ACT Brumbies	15	10	5	785	2	30	9	0	97	0	0
2023	RC Toulonnais	6	0	4	60	0	4	4	0	20	0	0
2024	ACT Brumbies	15	15	0	1064	1	41	21	0	150	0	0
2025	ACT Brumbies	12	12	0	725	0	27	6	0	72	0	0
Grand Total		83	72	9	5181	6	180	71	3	612	0	0

=== International ===
Season	Team	Matches	Starts	Sub	Minutes	Tries	Cons	Pens	Drops	Points	YC	RC
2020	Australia	4	1	3	80	1	0	0	0	5	0	0
2021	Australia	12	11	1	833	1	20	21	0	108	1	0
2022	Australia	4	1	3	107	0	4	1	0	11	0	0
Grand Total		20	13	7	1020	2	24	22	0	124	1	0

As of 14 June 2024
