= Jack Hardy (rugby union) =

Australian rugby union player

- Born: 26 March 1999 (age 27) Australia
- Height: 180 cm (5 ft 11 in)
- Weight: 98 kg (216 lb; 15 st 6 lb)
- Notable relative: Mitch Hardy

Rugby union career
- Position(s): Outside Centre, Fullback
Senior career
Years	Team	Apps	(Points)
2018–	Western Force	0	(0)
- Correct as of 9 March 2019
Super Rugby
Years	Team	Apps	(Points)
2019–2020	Reds	7	(5)
- Correct as of 9 March 2019

Jack Hardy (born 26 March 1999, in Australia) is an Australian rugby union player who plays for the Queensland Reds in Super Rugby. His playing position is fullback. He has signed to play for the Reds in 2019.
