= Tom Ross (rugby union) =

Australian rugby union player

- Born: 29 April 1998 (age 28) Canberra, Australia
- Height: 180 cm (5 ft 11 in)
- Weight: 122 kg (269 lb; 19 st 3 lb)
- University: University of Canberra

Rugby union career
- Position: Tighthead Prop
- Current team: Stade Nicois
Senior career
Years	Team	Apps	(Points)
2017-	Gungahlin Eagles		
2018−	University of Canberra Vikings		
- Correct as of 13 August 2018
Super Rugby
Years	Team	Apps	(Points)
2019–2023	Brumbies	30	(5)
2024	Waratahs	8	(0)
2024-2025	Stade Nicois	21	(5)
- Correct as of 31 May 2024
International career
Years	Team	Apps	(Points)
2018	Australia U20	6	(0)
- Correct as of 13 August 2018

Tom Ross (born 29 April 1998) is an Australian rugby union player who plays for Stade Nicois in the French Pro D2. His playing position is tighthead prop. He has previously represented the NSW Waratahs and ACT Brumbies in Super Rugby.

Ross also represented Australia under 20 at the 2018 Oceania u20s Championship and the 2018 World u20s Championship, where he was "one of the Wallabies most impressive performers in the tournament". He was educated at Canberra's Daramalan College, and represented ACT u17s in 2015, captaining the side to victory in the 2015 Gold Cup final.
