= Bayley Kuenzle =

Australian rugby union player (born 1998)

- Born: 18 June 1998 (age 28) Sydney, New South Wales, Australia
- Height: 186 cm (6 ft 1 in)
- Weight: 92 kg (203 lb; 14 st 7 lb)
- School: Newington College

Rugby union career
- Position(s): Fly-half, Centre, Wing
- Current team: Glasgow Warriors
Senior career
Years	Team	Apps	(Points)
2019	Canberra Vikings	9	(6)
2026–	Glasgow Warriors	2	(0)
- Correct as of 15:30, 7 October 2026 (UTC)
Super Rugby
Years	Team	Apps	(Points)
2019–2021	Brumbies	20	(38)
2022–2026	Force	48	(61)
International career
Years	Team	Apps	(Points)
2018	Australia U20	4	(5)
2022	Australia A	2	(0)
- Correct as of 15:30, 7 October 2026 (UTC)

Bayley Kuenzle (born 18 June 1998) is an Australian professional rugby union player who currently plays as a wing and centre for Glasgow Warriors. He previously played for the Force in the Super Rugby.

== Club career ==
=== Brumbies ===
He played junior rugby for Burraneer Rugby Club from 2005 to 2011 and for Southern Districts Rugby Club from 2018 to 2020. Kuenzle previously played for the Brumbies in the Super Rugby, making his professional debut for the team in 2019.

=== Force ===
Kuenzle's playing position has varied throughout his career. While at the Brumbies his usual position was fly-half. After moving to the Force he transitioned into the midfield, playing primarily at inside centre (No. 12). By 2024, Kuenzle had played several games at right wing.

=== Glasgow Warriors ===
In April 2026, The Australian reported that Kuenzle, who had not had a senior international Test cap, had signed a deal with the Scottish team Glasgow Warriors in the United Rugby Championship (URC) following the conclusion of the 2026 Super Rugby season. On 29 April, he signed for Warriors on a two-year deal.

He had his first taste of Warriors action in their pre-season match against Bath Rugby at Old Anniesland on 18 September 2026.

He made his competitive debut in Glasgow's first United Rugby Championship match of the season. This was against Munster at their home ground Thomond Park. Glasgow won the match, securing a try bonus point, in a 26-20 points victory. Kuenzle became Glasgow Warrior No. 378.

== International career ==
Kuenzle has made appearances for the Australia U20 and A sides. He was called up to the Australia national team for the first time in 2024, but is yet to make an appearance.
