= Joe Cotton (rugby union) =

Australian rugby union player

- Born: Joseph Cotton; 12 May 1999 (age 27) Bristol, England
- Height: 186 cm (6 ft 1 in)
- Weight: 105 kg (231 lb; 16 st 7 lb)

Rugby union career
- Position: Hooker
Senior career
Years	Team	Apps	(Points)
2019–2020	Sydney	2	(5)
- Correct as of 6 January 2020
Super Rugby
Years	Team	Apps	(Points)
2020–	Waratahs	1	(0)
- Correct as of 6 January 2020
Medal record
Men's rugby union
Representing Australia
Oceania U20 Championship
Winner	2019 Gold Coast
Junior World Cup
Runner-up	2019 Argentina

Joe Cotton (born 12 May 1999 in Bristol, England) is a professional rugby union player, currently unattached he previously played for the NSW Waratahs in Super Rugby & Bristol Bears in Premiership Rugby. His playing position is hooker. He has signed to the Waratahs elite development squad for the 2020 season.
