= Andrew Tuala =

Australian rugby union player

- Born: 9 March 1991 (age 35) Australia
- Height: 178 cm (5 ft 10 in)
- Weight: 136 kg (300 lb; 21 st 6 lb)
- School: Mount Roskill Grammar School

Rugby union career
- Position: Hooker/Prop
- Current team: Waratahs; Houston SaberCats
Senior career
Years	Team	Apps	(Points)
2016–2017	Greater Sydney Rams	13	(0)
2018	Melbourne Rising	6	(0)
2019	NSW Country Eagles	4	(5)
2022	LA Giltinis	14	(25)
2023	Houston SaberCats	3	(0)
- Correct as of 26 June 2023
Super Rugby
Years	Team	Apps	(Points)
2019–2021	Waratahs	9	(0)
- Correct as of 14 June 2021

Andrew Tuala (born 9 March 1991 in Australia) is an Australian rugby union player who plays for the New South Wales Waratahs in Super Rugby. His regular playing position is hooker, however he can also play prop. He has signed for the Waratahs squad in 2019. He also plays for the Houston SaberCats in Major League Rugby (MLR).
