= Chris Talakai =

Australian rugby union player

- Born: 26 June 1994 (age 32) Australia
- Height: 179 cm (5 ft 10 in)
- Weight: 118 kg (260 lb; 18 st 8 lb)
- Notable relative(s): Sam Talakai (brother), Adiana Talakai (sister)

Rugby union career
- Position: Prop
Senior career
| Years | Team | Apps | (Points) |
| 2015 | Sydney Stars | 2 | (0) |
| 2018–2019 | NSW Country Eagles | 10 | (0) |
| 2021–2023 | Bayonne | 3 | (0) |
| 2024- | RC Narbonne | 32 | (10) |
- Correct as of 10 September 2026
Super Rugby
| Years | Team | Apps | (Points) |
| 2019–2021 | Waratahs | 18 | (0) |
- Correct as of 12 June 2021

Chris Talakai (born in Australia) is an Australian rugby union player for French club Bayonne. His position is prop. Talakai previously played Super Rugby for the New South Wales Waratahs.
