= Harry Hoopert =

- Born: 16 September 1998 (age 28) Toowoomba, Queensland, Australia
- Height: 1.91 m (6 ft 3 in)
- Weight: 116 kg (256 lb; 18 st 4 lb)
- School: Toowoomba Grammar School

Rugby union career
- Position: Prop
- Current team: Western Force
Senior career
Years	Team	Apps	(Points)
2018–2022	Queensland Reds	48	(20)
2018–2019	Queensland Country	14	(15)
2024–2025	Western Force	3	(0)
- Correct as of 1 January 2025
International career
Years	Team	Apps	(Points)
2018	Australia U20	5	(0)
2022	Australia A	3	(0)
- Correct as of 1 January 2025

Harry Hoopert (born 16 September 1998) is an Australia professional rugby union player who plays as a prop for Super Rugby club Western Force.

== Club career ==
Hoopert started his professional career with the Queensland Reds, making his Super Rugby debut against the Lions during the 2018 season at Lang Park in Brisbane.

== International career ==
Hoopert was chosen to represent Australia at the 2018 World Rugby Under 20 Championship, making his first international appearance against Wales.
