= Will Harrison (rugby union) =

Australian rugby union player

- Born: 30 July 1999 (age 27) Sydney, New South Wales, Australia
- Height: 178 cm (5 ft 10 in)
- Weight: 83 kg (183 lb; 13 st 1 lb)
- School: Marcellin College

Rugby union career
- Position(s): First five-eighth, Fullback
Senior career
Years	Team	Apps	(Points)
2018–2019	Randwick	8	(45)
2018	Sydney	11	(70)
2020–2024	Waratahs	38	(249)
2024–2026	Kintetsu Liners	16	(94)
- Correct as of 31 May 2024
International career
Years	Team	Apps	(Points)
2018–2019	Australia U20	9	(55)
2020	Australia		
- Correct as of 20 July 2020
Medal record
Men's rugby union
Representing Australia
Oceania U20 Championship
Winner	2019 Gold Coast
Junior World Cup
Runner-up	2019 Argentina

Will Harrison (born 30 July 1999) is an Australian rugby union player who plays as a fly-half for the New South Wales Waratahs in Super Rugby. He signed for the Waratahs in 2019. and was picked for the Australia national team in late 2020 under coach Dave Rennie.
