= Lachlan Swinton =

Australia international rugby union player

- Born: 16 January 1997 (age 29) Sydney, Australia
- Height: 195 cm (6 ft 5 in)
- Weight: 113 kg (17 st 11 lb; 249 lb)
- School: Knox Grammar School

Rugby union career
- Position(s): Flanker, lock
Senior career
| Years | Team | Apps | (Points) |
| 2017 | New South Wales Country Eagles | 4 | (0) |
| 2018–2024 | Sydney | 7 | (10) |
| 2024– | Bordeaux Bègles | 11 | (5) |
- Correct as of 27 May 2025
Super Rugby
| Years | Team | Apps | (Points) |
| 2018–2024 | Waratahs | 56 | (30) |
- Correct as of 27 May 2025
International career
| Years | Team | Apps | (Points) |
| 2017 | Australia Under-20 | 5 | (0) |
| 2020– | Australia | 4 | (0) |
- Correct as of 23 January 2020

Lachlan Swinton (born 16 January 1997) is an Australian rugby union player who plays for the Bordeaux Bègles in the Top 14 competition. His position of choice is flanker.
