= Will Miller (rugby union) =

Australian rugby union player (born 1993)

- Born: Will Miller; 20 January 1993 (age 33) Australia
- Height: 1.82 m (6 ft 0 in)
- Weight: 95 kg (14 st 13 lb)

Rugby union career
- Position: Flanker
Senior career
Years	Team	Apps	(Points)
2014–2016	NSW Country Eagles	11	(20)
2016	Sydney Rays	4	(0)
- Correct as of 6 November 2017
Super Rugby
Years	Team	Apps	(Points)
2017	Rebels	5	(5)
2018–2019	Waratahs		
2020–2021	Brumbies		
- Correct as of 6 November 2017

Will Miller (born 20 January 1993) is an Australian professional rugby union who played for the ACT Brumbies in Super Rugby. His position is flanker.

== Career ==
He made his debut for the Rebels against the Sharks playing all 80 minutes for the Rebels in a 9–9 draw.

== Super Rugby statistics ==
As of 6 November 2017

Season	Team	Games	Starts	Sub	Mins	Tries	Cons	Pens	Drops	Points	Yel	Red
2017	Rebels	5	3	2	268	1	0	0	0	5	0	0
Total		5	3	2	268	1	0	0	0	5	0	0
