= Connal McInerney =

Australian rugby union player

- Born: Connal McInereny; 2 March 1995 (age 31) Canberra, Australia
- Height: 181 cm (5 ft 11 in)
- Weight: 103 kg (16 st 3 lb; 227 lb)

Rugby union career
- Position: Hooker
Senior career
Years	Team	Apps	(Points)
2014–2016	Canberra Vikings	10	(12)
2017	NSW Country Eagles	5	(5)
2018–2019	Canberra Vikings	11	(20)
Super Rugby
Years	Team	Apps	(Points)
2018–2024	Brumbies	57	(50)
International career
Years	Team	Apps	(Points)
2021–	Australia	1	(5)

Connal McInerney (born 2 March 1995) is an Australian rugby union player who plays for the Brumbies in the Super Rugby competition and Australia internationally. His position of choice is hooker.

== International career ==
McInerney was first called up to the Wallabies squad in 2020, but was not named in any match-day team selections. After another successful Super Rugby season, McInerney was again called up to the cover squad. He was not selected for any matches during the 2021 France tour of Australia or 2021 Rugby Championship, but finally made his test match debut against Japan on the 2021 end-of-year tour, coming off the bench in a 32–23 win and scoring his maiden try in the final minutes.
