= Ioane =

Ioane is a given name and surname. Notable people with the name include:

== Given name ==
Georgian name for Given name John:

- Saint John the Iberian, a Georgian monk
- Ioane Bagrationi (Georgian: იოანე ბაგრატიონი) (1768–1830), Georgian prince (batonishvili), writer and encyclopedist
- Ioane Petritsi (Georgian: იოანე პეტრიწი), Georgian Neoplatonic philosopher of the 11th or 12th century
- Ioane Shavteli (Georgian: იოანე შავთელი), Georgian poet of the late 12th and early 13th centuries
- Ioane-Zosime (Georgian: იოანე-ზოსიმე), the 10th century Georgian Christian monk and religious writer known for liturgical compilations and hymns

== Surname ==
- Akira Ioane (born 1995), New Zealand rugby union footballer
- Digby Ioane (born 1985), Australian rugby union footballer
- Eddie Ioane (born 1966), Samoan rugby union footballer
- Jason Ioane, fictional character from the TV series Baywatch Hawaii
- Junior Ioane (born 1977), American football defensive tackle in the National Football League
- Kete Ioane (born 1950), Cook Islands politician and former Cabinet Minister
- Moana Ioane, Cook Islands politician and member of the Cook Islands Parliament
- Monty Ioane (born 1994), Australian-born rugby union footballer for Italy
- Rieko Ioane (born 1997), New Zealand rugby union footballer
- Vega Ioane (born 2004), American football player
