= 2022 Rugby Championship =

Southern hemisphere competition

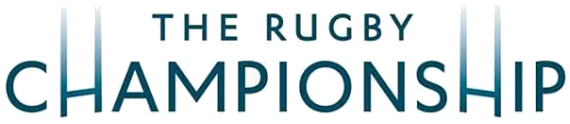
- Date: 6 August – 24 September 2022
- Countries: Argentina; Australia; New Zealand; South Africa

Final positions
- Champions: New Zealand (19th title)
- Bledisloe Cup: New Zealand
- Freedom Cup: New Zealand
- Mandela Challenge Plate: Australia
- Puma Trophy: Australia

Tournament statistics
- Matches played: 12
- Tries scored: 76 (6.33 per match)
- Attendance: 463,702 (38,642 per match)
- Top scorer(s): Emiliano Boffelli (71); Richie Mo'unga (71)
- Most tries: Samisoni Taukei'aho (5)

The 2022 Rugby Championship was the tenth edition of the annual southern hemisphere competition, involving Argentina, Australia, New Zealand and South Africa. The tournament returned to being staged across all competing nations after the disruption from COVID-19 in 2020 and 2021.

The competition is operated by SANZAAR, a joint venture of the four countries' national unions, and known for sponsorship reasons as The Castle Rugby Championship in South Africa, The Lipovitan-D Rugby Championship in New Zealand, The eToro Rugby Championship in Australia, and The Zurich Rugby Championship in Argentina.

The tournament was restructured for the first time since Argentina joined the competition, with each team playing their games both home and away. Each country hosted three games, but not evenly across the competing nations. Argentina hosted Australia twice and South Africa once; Australia hosted South Africa twice and New Zealand once; New Zealand hosted Argentina twice and Australia once; and South Africa hosted New Zealand twice and Argentina once.

== Table ==
| Pos | Team | Pld | W | D | L | PF | PA | PD | TF | TA | TB | LB | Pts |
|---|---|---|---|---|---|---|---|---|---|---|---|---|---|
| 1 | New Zealand | 6 | 4 | 0 | 2 | 195 | 123 | +72 | 24 | 11 | 2 | 1 | 19 |
| 2 | South Africa | 6 | 4 | 0 | 2 | 159 | 119 | +40 | 20 | 14 | 2 | 0 | 18 |
| 3 | Australia | 6 | 2 | 0 | 4 | 139 | 192 | −53 | 17 | 25 | 1 | 1 | 10 |
| 4 | Argentina | 6 | 2 | 0 | 4 | 141 | 200 | −59 | 15 | 26 | 1 | 0 | 9 |

Source: ESPN

== Fixtures ==
=== Round 1 ===
6 August 2022
17:05 SAST (UTC+2)

| South Africa | 26–10 | New Zealand |
| Try: Arendse 9' c le Roux 80' c Con: Pollard (2/2) 10', 80'; Pen: Pollard (3/3) 22', 50', 73'; Drop: Pollard (1/1) 58' | Report | Try: Frizell 78' c Con: Mo'unga (1/1) 79'; Pen: J. Barrett (1/1) 35' |

Mbombela Stadium, Mbombela
Attendance: 42,367
Referee: Angus Gardner (Australia)

| FB | 15 | Damian Willemse |
| RW | 14 | Kurt-Lee Arendse | (red card) 74' |
| OC | 13 | Lukhanyo Am | | (substituted off) 79' |
| IC | 12 | Damian de Allende |
| LW | 11 | Makazole Mapimpi |
| FH | 10 | Handré Pollard |
| SH | 9 | Faf de Klerk | | (substituted off) 1' |
| N8 | 8 | Jasper Wiese |
| BF | 7 | Pieter-Steph du Toit | | (substituted off) 49' |
| OF | 6 | Siya Kolisi (c) |
| RL | 5 | Lood de Jager | | (substituted off) 47' |
| LL | 4 | Eben Etzebeth | | (substituted off) 74' |
| TP | 3 | Frans Malherbe | | (substituted off) 51' |
| HK | 2 | Malcolm Marx | | (substituted off) 54' |
| LP | 1 | Trevor Nyakane | | (substituted off) 56' |
Replacements:
| HK | 16 | Bongi Mbonambi | | (substituted on) 54' |
| PR | 17 | Steven Kitshoff | | (substituted on) 56' |
| PR | 18 | Vincent Koch | | (substituted on) 51' |
| LK | 19 | Salmaan Moerat | | (substituted on) 74' |
| LK | 20 | Franco Mostert | | (substituted on) 49' |
| FL | 21 | Kwagga Smith | | (substituted on) 47' |
| SH | 22 | Jaden Hendrikse | | (substituted on) 1' |
| WG | 23 | Willie le Roux | | (substituted on) 79' |
Coach:
(South Africa) Jacques Nienaber

| FB | 15 | Jordie Barrett | (substituted off) 53' |
| RW | 14 | Will Jordan |
| OC | 13 | Rieko Ioane |
| IC | 12 | David Havili |
| LW | 11 | Caleb Clarke |
| FH | 10 | Beauden Barrett | (substituted off) 75' |
| SH | 9 | Aaron Smith | (substituted off) 75' |
| N8 | 8 | Ardie Savea |
| OF | 7 | Sam Cane (c) |
| BF | 6 | Akira Ioane | (substituted off) 56' |
| RL | 5 | Scott Barrett | (substituted off) 72' |
| LL | 4 | Sam Whitelock |
| TP | 3 | Angus Ta'avao | (substituted off) 49' |
| HK | 2 | Samisoni Taukei'aho | (substituted off) 55' |
| LP | 1 | George Bower | (substituted off) 50' |
Replacements:
| HK | 16 | Dane Coles | (substituted on) 55' |
| PR | 17 | Ethan de Groot | (substituted on) 50' |
| PR | 18 | Tyrel Lomax | (substituted on) 49' |
| LK | 19 | Tupou Vaa'i | (substituted on) 72' |
| FL | 20 | Shannon Frizell | (substituted on) 56' |
| SH | 21 | Finlay Christie | (substituted on) 75' |
| FH | 22 | Richie Mo'unga | (substituted on) 53' |
| CE | 23 | Quinn Tupaea | (substituted on) 75' |
Coach:
(New Zealand) Ian Foster

Player of the Match:
Malcolm Marx (South Africa)

Assistant referees:
Luke Pearce (England)
Christophe Ridley (England)
Television match official:
Brett Cronan (Australia)

Notes:

- Malcolm Marx (South Africa) earned his 50th test cap.
- South Africa win back-to-back matches over New Zealand for the first time since 2009.
- This was South Africa's first home victory over New Zealand since 4 October 2014.
- With this loss, New Zealand lose more than two consecutive games for the first time since 1998.
- As a result of this loss, New Zealand drop to fifth in the World Rugby Rankings, their lowest ranking ever.
- New Zealand lose their opening match of the Rugby Championship/Tri Nations for the first time since 2005.
- It was South Africa's biggest win over New Zealand since 30 June 1928, when South Africa won 17–0 in Kingsmead, Durban.

6 August 2022
16:05 AST (UTC−3)

| Argentina | 26–41 | Australia (1 BP) |
| Try: Matera 5' c González 54' c Con: Boffelli (2/2) 6', 57'; Pen: Boffelli (4/5) 11', 15', 21', 41' | Report | Try: Petaia 17' c McReight 47' c Penalty try 61'; Fainga'a 69' c Ikitau 80+5' c Con: Cooper (1/1) 18'; Hodge (3/3) 48', 71', 80+6'; Pen: Cooper (1/1) 9'; Hodge (1/1) 65' |

Estadio Malvinas Argentinas, Mendoza
Attendance: 33,000
Referee: Mike Adamson (Scotland)

| FB | 15 | Juan Cruz Mallía |
| RW | 14 | Santiago Cordero | | (substituted off) 79' |
| OC | 13 | Matías Orlando | | (substituted off) 65' |
| IC | 12 | Jerónimo de la Fuente |
| LW | 11 | Emiliano Boffelli |
| FH | 10 | Santiago Carreras |
| SH | 9 | Tomás Cubelli | | (substituted off) 52' |
| N8 | 8 | Pablo Matera |
| OF | 7 | Marcos Kremer |
| BF | 6 | Juan Martín González | | (substituted off) 71' |
| RL | 5 | Tomás Lavanini |
| LL | 4 | Matías Alemanno | (yellow card) 61' to 71' | (substituted off) 71' |
| TP | 3 | Francisco Gómez Kodela | | (substituted off) 62' |
| HK | 2 | Julián Montoya (c) | | (substituted off) 57' |
| LP | 1 | Nahuel Tetaz Chaparro | | (substituted off) 57' |
Replacements:
| HK | 16 | Agustín Creevy | | (substituted on) 57' |
| PR | 17 | Thomas Gallo | | (substituted on) 57' |
| PR | 18 | Joel Sclavi | | (substituted on) 62' |
| FL | 19 | Santiago Grondona | | (substituted on) 71' |
| FL | 20 | Rodrigo Bruni | | (substituted on) 71' |
| SH | 21 | Lautaro Bazán | | (substituted on) 52' |
| FH | 22 | Tomás Albornoz | | (substituted on) 79' |
| CE | 23 | Matías Moroni | | (substituted on) 65' |
Coach:
(Australia) Michael Cheika

| FB | 15 | Tom Wright |
| RW | 14 | Jordan Petaia |
| OC | 13 | Len Ikitau |
| IC | 12 | Hunter Paisami |
| LW | 11 | Marika Koroibete |
| FH | 10 | Quade Cooper | (substituted off) 47' |
| SH | 9 | Nic White | (substituted off) 69' |
| N8 | 8 | Rob Valetini |
| OF | 7 | Fraser McReight | (substituted off) 76' |
| BF | 6 | Jed Holloway | (substituted off) 57' |
| RL | 5 | Matt Philip | (substituted off) 52' |
| LL | 4 | Darcy Swain |
| TP | 3 | Allan Alaalatoa | (substituted off) 52' |
| HK | 2 | Folau Fainga'a | (substituted off) 71' |
| LP | 1 | James Slipper (c) | (substituted off) 71' |
Replacements:
| HK | 16 | Lachlan Lonergan | (substituted on) 71' |
| PR | 17 | Matt Gibbon | (substituted on) 71' |
| PR | 18 | Taniela Tupou | (substituted on) 52' |
| LK | 19 | Nick Frost | (substituted on) 52' |
| FL | 20 | Rob Leota | (substituted on) 76' |
| FL | 21 | Pete Samu | (substituted on) 57' |
| SH | 22 | Jake Gordon | (substituted on) 69' |
| FB | 23 | Reece Hodge | (substituted on) 47' |
Coach:
(New Zealand) Dave Rennie

Player of the Match:
Rob Valetini (Australia)

Assistant referees:
Karl Dickson (England)
Chris Busby (Ireland)
Television match official:
Marius van der Westhuizen (South Africa)

Notes:

- Michael Hooper (Australia) had been named to start and captain, but withdrew from the team the day before the game and returned to Australia for personal reasons. Fraser McReight replaced him in the starting XV with James Slipper becoming captain.
- Tomás Albornoz (Argentina) and Matt Gibbon and Jed Holloway (both Australia) made their international debuts.
- Australia retain the Puma Trophy.

=== Round 2 ===
13 August 2022
17:05 SAST (UTC+2)

| South Africa | 23–35 | New Zealand |
| Try: Am 36' c Mapimpi 58' c Con: Pollard (2/2) 59', 37'; Pen: Pollard (3/3) 40+1', 45', 67' | Report | Try: Cane 27' m Taukei'aho 32' c Havili 73' c S. Barrett 78' c Con: Mo'unga (3/4) 34', 74', 80'; Pen: Mo'unga (3/3) 24', 48', 57' |

Ellis Park Stadium, Johannesburg
Attendance: 61,519
Referee: Luke Pearce (England)

| FB | 15 | Damian Willemse | (yellow card) 3' to 13' |
| RW | 14 | Jesse Kriel | | (substituted off) 8' |
| OC | 13 | Lukhanyo Am |
| IC | 12 | Damian de Allende |
| LW | 11 | Makazole Mapimpi |
| FH | 10 | Handré Pollard |
| SH | 9 | Jaden Hendrikse | | (substituted off) 75' |
| N8 | 8 | Duane Vermeulen | | (substituted off) 35' |
| BF | 7 | Pieter-Steph du Toit |
| OF | 6 | Siya Kolisi (c) | | (substituted off) 50' |
| RL | 5 | Lood de Jager | | (substituted off) 48' |
| LL | 4 | Eben Etzebeth |
| TP | 3 | Frans Malherbe | | (substituted off) 50' |
| HK | 2 | Joseph Dweba | | (substituted off) 29' |
| LP | 1 | Ox Nché | | (substituted off) 35' |
Replacements:
| HK | 16 | Malcolm Marx | | (substituted on) 29' |
| PR | 17 | Steven Kitshoff | | (substituted on) 35' |
| PR | 18 | Vincent Koch | | (substituted on) 50' |
| LK | 19 | Franco Mostert | | (substituted on) 48' |
| N8 | 20 | Jasper Wiese | | (substituted on) 35' |
| FL | 21 | Kwagga Smith | | (substituted on) 50' |
| SH | 22 | Herschel Jantjies | | (substituted on) 75' |
| WG | 23 | Willie le Roux | | (substituted on) 8' |
Coach:
(South Africa) Jacques Nienaber

| FB | 15 | Jordie Barrett |
| RW | 14 | Will Jordan |
| OC | 13 | Rieko Ioane | | (substituted off) 77' |
| IC | 12 | David Havili |
| LW | 11 | Caleb Clarke | | (substituted off) 60' |
| FH | 10 | Richie Mo'unga |
| SH | 9 | Aaron Smith | | (substituted off) 68' |
| N8 | 8 | Ardie Savea |
| OF | 7 | Sam Cane (c) | | (substituted off) 68' |
| BF | 6 | Shannon Frizell | | (substituted off) 59' |
| RL | 5 | Scott Barrett |
| LL | 4 | Sam Whitelock |
| TP | 3 | Tyrel Lomax | | (substituted off) 54' |
| HK | 2 | Samisoni Taukei'aho | | (substituted off) 55' |
| LP | 1 | Ethan de Groot | | (substituted off) 54' |
Replacements:
| HK | 16 | Codie Taylor | | (substituted on) 55' |
| PR | 17 | George Bower | | (substituted on) 54' |
| PR | 18 | Fletcher Newell | | (substituted on) 54' |
| LK | 19 | Tupou Vaa'i | | (substituted on) 77' |
| FL | 20 | Akira Ioane | | (substituted on) 59' |
| SH | 21 | Finlay Christie | | (substituted on) 68' |
| FH | 22 | Beauden Barrett | (yellow card) 66' to 76' | (substituted on) 60' |
| CE | 23 | Quinn Tupaea | | (substituted on) 68' |
Coach:
(New Zealand) Ian Foster

Player of the Match:
Rieko Ioane (New Zealand)

Assistant referees:
Angus Gardner (Australia)
Christophe Ridley (England)
Television match official:
Brett Cronan (Australia)

Notes:

- Bongi Mbonambi (South Africa) had been named to start but withdrew days before the game and was replaced by Joseph Dweba.
- Frans Malherbe (South Africa) earned his 50th test cap.
- Fletcher Newell (New Zealand) made his international debut.
- New Zealand retain the Freedom Cup.

13 August 2022
16:05 AST (UTC−3)

| (1 BP) Argentina | 48–17 | Australia |
| Try: Imhoff 1' c Gallo (2) 5' c, 63' c De la Fuente 23' c González 30' m Boffelli 77' m Albornoz 80+1' c Con: Boffelli (5/7) 2', 6', 25', 64', 80+2'; Pen: Boffelli (1/1) 53' | Report | Try: Slipper 11' c Ikitau 66' c Con: O'Connor (2/2) 12', 66'; Pen: O'Connor (1/1) 16' |

Estadio San Juan del Bicentenario, San Juan
Attendance: 23,155
Referee: Karl Dickson (England)

| FB | 15 | Juan Cruz Mallía |
| RW | 14 | Emiliano Boffelli |
| OC | 13 | Matías Moroni |
| IC | 12 | Jerónimo de la Fuente | (substituted off) 26' |
| LW | 11 | Juan Imhoff |
| FH | 10 | Santiago Carreras | (substituted off) 77' |
| SH | 9 | Gonzalo Bertranou | (substituted off) 65' |
| N8 | 8 | Pablo Matera | (substituted off) 76' |
| OF | 7 | Marcos Kremer | (substituted off) 47' |
| BF | 6 | Juan Martín González |
| RL | 5 | Tomás Lavanini |
| LL | 4 | Matías Alemanno |
| TP | 3 | Francisco Gómez Kodela | (substituted off) 65' |
| HK | 2 | Julián Montoya (c) | (substituted off) 73' |
| LP | 1 | Thomas Gallo | (substituted off) 68' |
Replacements:
| HK | 16 | Agustín Creevy | (substituted on) 73' |
| PR | 17 | Nahuel Tetaz Chaparro | (substituted on) 68' |
| PR | 18 | Joel Sclavi | (substituted on) 65' |
| N8 | 19 | Facundo Isa | (substituted on) 47' |
| FL | 20 | Rodrigo Bruni | (substituted on) 76' |
| SH | 21 | Tomás Cubelli | (substituted on) 65' |
| FH | 22 | Tomás Albornoz | (substituted on) 77' |
| CE | 23 | Lucio Cinti | (substituted on) 26' |
Coach:
(Australia) Michael Cheika

| FB | 15 | Tom Wright | | (substituted off) 68' |
| RW | 14 | Jordan Petaia |
| OC | 13 | Len Ikitau |
| IC | 12 | Lalakai Foketi | | (substituted off) 62' |
| LW | 11 | Marika Koroibete |
| FH | 10 | James O'Connor |
| SH | 9 | Nic White | | (substituted off) 54' |
| N8 | 8 | Rob Valetini |
| OF | 7 | Fraser McReight | (yellow card) 63' to 73' |
| BF | 6 | Jed Holloway | | (substituted off) 54' |
| RL | 5 | Darcy Swain |
| LL | 4 | Rory Arnold | | (substituted off) 54' |
| TP | 3 | Taniela Tupou | | (substituted off) 58' |
| HK | 2 | Lachlan Lonergan | | (substituted off) 65' |
| LP | 1 | James Slipper (c) | | (substituted off) 68' |
Replacements:
| HK | 16 | Billy Pollard | | (substituted on) 65' |
| PR | 17 | Matt Gibbon | | (substituted on) 68' |
| PR | 18 | Pone Fa'amausili | | (substituted on) 58' |
| LK | 19 | Nick Frost | | (substituted on) 54' |
| FL | 20 | Pete Samu | | (substituted on) 54' |
| SH | 21 | Tate McDermott | | (substituted on) 54' |
| CE | 22 | Irae Simone | | (substituted on) 62' |
| FB | 23 | Reece Hodge | | (substituted on) 68' |
Coach:
(New Zealand) Dave Rennie

Player of the Match:
Thomas Gallo (Argentina)

Assistant referees:
Mike Adamson (Scotland)
Chris Busby (Ireland)
Television match official:
Marius van der Westhuizen (South Africa)

Notes:

- Folau Fainga'a (Australia) had been named to start but withdraw a day before the test due to injury. Lachlan Lonergan replaced him in the starting XV, with Billy Pollard joining on the bench.
- Pone Fa'amausili and Billy Pollard (both Australia) made their international debuts.
- This was Argentina's biggest win over Australia, surpassing their 18–3 win in 1983.

=== Round 3 ===
27 August 2022
15:00 ACST (UTC+9:30)

| Australia | 25–17 | South Africa |
| Try: McReight (2) 2' c, 57' c Koroibete 47' m Con: Lolesio (2/3) 2', 58'; Pen: Lolesio (2/2) 6', 63' | Report | Try: Smith (2) 75' c, 80' c Con: Jantjies (1/1) 75'; Hendrikse (1/1) 80'; Pen: Pollard (1/3) 23' |

Adelaide Oval, Adelaide
Attendance: 36,336
Referee: Paul Williams (New Zealand)

| FB | 15 | Reece Hodge |
| RW | 14 | Tom Wright | (yellow card) 29' to 39' |
| OC | 13 | Len Ikitau |
| IC | 12 | Hunter Paisami |
| LW | 11 | Marika Koroibete | | (substituted off) 70' |
| FH | 10 | Noah Lolesio |
| SH | 9 | Nic White | | (substituted off) 64' |
| N8 | 8 | Rob Valetini | (yellow card) 79' |
| OF | 7 | Fraser McReight | | (substituted off) 64' |
| BF | 6 | Jed Holloway | | (substituted off) 70' |
| RL | 5 | Matt Philip |
| LL | 4 | Rory Arnold | | (substituted off) 51' |
| TP | 3 | Allan Alaalatoa | | (substituted off) 64' |
| HK | 2 | Folau Fainga'a | | (substituted off) 56' |
| LP | 1 | James Slipper (c) | | (substituted off) 64' |
Replacements:
| HK | 16 | Dave Porecki | | (substituted on) 56' |
| PR | 17 | Scott Sio | | (substituted on) 64' |
| PR | 18 | Taniela Tupou | | (substituted on) 64' |
| LK | 19 | Darcy Swain | | (substituted on) 51' |
| FL | 20 | Rob Leota | | (substituted on) 70' |
| FL | 21 | Pete Samu | | (substituted on) 64' |
| SH | 22 | Tate McDermott | | (substituted on) 64' |
| WG | 23 | Andrew Kellaway | | (substituted on) 70' |
Coach:
(New Zealand) Dave Rennie

| FB | 15 | Damian Willemse |
| RW | 14 | Warrick Gelant | | (substituted off) 53' |
| OC | 13 | Lukhanyo Am |
| IC | 12 | Damian de Allende |
| LW | 11 | Makazole Mapimpi |
| FH | 10 | Handré Pollard | | (substituted off) 59' |
| SH | 9 | Faf de Klerk | (yellow card) 39' to 49' | (substituted off) 59' |
| N8 | 8 | Duane Vermeulen | | (substituted off) 50' |
| BF | 7 | Pieter-Steph du Toit | | (substituted off) 59' |
| OF | 6 | Siya Kolisi (c) |
| RL | 5 | Lood de Jager |
| LL | 4 | Eben Etzebeth |
| TP | 3 | Frans Malherbe | | (substituted off) 56' |
| HK | 2 | Joseph Dweba | | 11' to 23' | | (substituted off) 40' |
| LP | 1 | Ox Nché | | (substituted off) 40' |
Replacements:
| HK | 16 | Malcolm Marx | | (substituted on) 11' | (substituted off) 23' | (substituted on) 40' |
| PR | 17 | Steven Kitshoff | | (substituted on) 40' |
| PR | 18 | Vincent Koch | | (substituted on) 56' |
| LK | 19 | Franco Mostert | | (substituted on) 59' |
| FL | 20 | Kwagga Smith | | (substituted on) 50' |
| SH | 21 | Jaden Hendrikse | | (substituted on) 59' |
| FH | 22 | Elton Jantjies | | (substituted on) 59' |
| FB | 23 | François Steyn | | (substituted on) 53' |
Coach:
(South Africa) Jacques Nienaber

Player of the Match:
Fraser McReight (Australia)

Assistant referees:
Ben O'Keeffe (New Zealand)
Tual Trainini (France)
Television match official:
Brendon Pickerill (New Zealand)

Notes:

- This was the first rugby test match hosted at Adelaide Oval since 2004.
- With this win Australia retained the Mandela Challenge Plate.

27 August 2022
19:45 NZST (UTC+12)

| (1 BP) New Zealand | 18–25 | Argentina |
| Try: Taukei'aho 11' m Clarke 32' c Con: Mo'unga (1/2) 33'; Pen: Mo'unga (2/3) 28', 46'; J. Barrett (0/1) | Report | Try: González 47' c Con: Boffelli (1/1) 48'; Pen: Boffelli (6/6) 7', 17', 36', 40', 56', 65' |

Rugby League Park, Christchurch
Attendance: 20,000
Referee: Nika Amashukeli (Georgia)

| FB | 15 | Jordie Barrett | | (substituted off) 79' |
| RW | 14 | Will Jordan |
| OC | 13 | Rieko Ioane | | (substituted off) 69' |
| IC | 12 | David Havili |
| LW | 11 | Caleb Clarke |
| FH | 10 | Richie Mo'unga |
| SH | 9 | Aaron Smith | | (substituted off) 62' |
| N8 | 8 | Ardie Savea |
| OF | 7 | Sam Cane (c) | | (substituted off) 66' |
| BF | 6 | Shannon Frizell | (yellow card) 70' |
| RL | 5 | Scott Barrett |
| LL | 4 | Sam Whitelock |
| TP | 3 | Tyrel Lomax | | (substituted off) 44' |
| HK | 2 | Samisoni Taukei'aho | | (substituted off) 44' |
| LP | 1 | Ethan de Groot | | (substituted off) 44' |
Replacements:
| HK | 16 | Codie Taylor | | (substituted on) 44' |
| PR | 17 | George Bower | | (substituted on) 44' |
| PR | 18 | Fletcher Newell | | (substituted on) 44' |
| LK | 19 | Tupou Vaa'i |
| FL | 20 | Akira Ioane | | (substituted on) 66' |
| SH | 21 | Finlay Christie | | (substituted on) 62' |
| FH | 22 | Stephen Perofeta | | (substituted on) 79' |
| CE | 23 | Quinn Tupaea | | (substituted on) 69' |
Coach:
(New Zealand) Ian Foster

| FB | 15 | Juan Cruz Mallía |
| RW | 14 | Emiliano Boffelli |
| OC | 13 | Matías Moroni |
| IC | 12 | Matías Orlando |
| LW | 11 | Lucio Cinti | (substituted off) 71' |
| FH | 10 | Santiago Carreras |
| SH | 9 | Gonzalo Bertranou | (substituted off) 66' |
| N8 | 8 | Pablo Matera |
| OF | 7 | Marcos Kremer |
| BF | 6 | Juan Martín González | (substituted off) 70' |
| RL | 5 | Tomás Lavanini |
| LL | 4 | Matías Alemanno | (substituted off) 61' |
| TP | 3 | Joel Sclavi | (substituted off) 52' |
| HK | 2 | Julián Montoya (c) | (substituted off) 78' |
| LP | 1 | Thomas Gallo | (substituted off) 57' |
Replacements:
| HK | 16 | Santiago Socino | (substituted on) 78' |
| PR | 17 | Mayco Vivas | (substituted on) 57' |
| PR | 18 | Eduardo Bello | (substituted on) 52' |
| LK | 19 | Guido Petti | (substituted on) 61' |
| FL | 20 | Santiago Grondona | (substituted on) 70' |
| SH | 21 | Tomás Cubelli | (substituted on) 66' |
| FH | 22 | Tomás Albornoz |
| WG | 23 | Santiago Cordero | (substituted on) 71' |
Coach:
(Australia) Michael Cheika

Player of the Match:
Emiliano Boffelli (Argentina)

Assistant referees:
Nic Berry (Australia)
Damon Murphy (Australia)
Television match official:
Brian MacNeice (Ireland)

Notes:

- Marcos Kremer (Argentina) earned his 50th cap.
- This was Argentina's first away win against New Zealand, as well as the first time Argentina has won two games in a row in the Rugby Championship.
- Michael Cheika became the second coach to beat New Zealand with two teams (Australia and Argentina). Eddie Jones did so with Australia and England.
- This was the first time that New Zealand lost 3 consecutive home games, and 3 home games in a calendar year.

=== Round 4 ===
3 September 2022
19:05 NZST (UTC+12)

| (1 BP) New Zealand | 53–3 | Argentina |
| Try: De Groot 9' c Clarke 18' c Ioane 37' c J. Barrett 60' c Savea 66' m Retallick 73' c B. Barrett 80+3' c Con: Mo'unga (4/4) 10', 20', 38', 61'; J. Barrett (2/3) 75', 80+4'; Pen: Mo'unga (2/2) 2', 46' | Report | Pen: Boffelli (1/1) 32' |

Waikato Stadium, Hamilton
Attendance: 22,000
Referee: Nic Berry (Australia)

| FB | 15 | Jordie Barrett |
| RW | 14 | Will Jordan |
| OC | 13 | Rieko Ioane |
| IC | 12 | David Havili | | (substituted off) 68' |
| LW | 11 | Caleb Clarke |
| FH | 10 | Richie Mo'unga | | (substituted off) 62' |
| SH | 9 | Aaron Smith | | (substituted off) 51' |
| N8 | 8 | Ardie Savea |
| OF | 7 | Sam Cane (c) | | (substituted off) 63' |
| BF | 6 | Shannon Frizell | | (substituted off) 58' |
| RL | 5 | Scott Barrett |
| LL | 4 | Sam Whitelock | | | (substituted off) 59' | (substituted on) 68' |
| TP | 3 | Tyrel Lomax | | (substituted off) 51' | (substituted on) 59' | (substituted off) 68' |
| HK | 2 | Samisoni Taukei'aho | | (substituted off) 62' |
| LP | 1 | Ethan de Groot | | (substituted off) 51' |
Replacements:
| HK | 16 | Dane Coles | | (substituted on) 62' |
| PR | 17 | George Bower | | (substituted on) 51' |
| PR | 18 | Fletcher Newell | (yellow card) 56' to 66' | (substituted on) 51' |
| LK | 19 | Brodie Retallick | | (substituted on) 58' |
| FL | 20 | Dalton Papalii | | (substituted on) 63' |
| SH | 21 | Finlay Christie | | (substituted on) 51' |
| FH | 22 | Beauden Barrett | | (substituted on) 62' |
| CE | 23 | Quinn Tupaea | | (substituted on) 68' |
Coach:
(New Zealand) Ian Foster

| FB | 15 | Juan Cruz Mallía |
| RW | 14 | Emiliano Boffelli |
| OC | 13 | Matías Moroni |
| IC | 12 | Matías Orlando |
| LW | 11 | Santiago Cordero | | (substituted off) 68' |
| FH | 10 | Santiago Carreras | | (substituted off) 40' |
| SH | 9 | Tomás Cubelli | | (substituted off) 47' |
| N8 | 8 | Pablo Matera |
| OF | 7 | Marcos Kremer |
| BF | 6 | Santiago Grondona | | (substituted off) 47' |
| RL | 5 | Tomás Lavanini | (yellow card) 35' to 45' |
| LL | 4 | Guido Petti | | (substituted off) 47' |
| TP | 3 | Joel Sclavi | | (substituted off) 47' |
| HK | 2 | Julián Montoya (c) | | (substituted off) 62' |
| LP | 1 | Thomas Gallo | | (substituted off) 68' |
Replacements:
| HK | 16 | Santiago Socino | | (substituted on) 62' |
| PR | 17 | Mayco Vivas | | (substituted on) 68' |
| PR | 18 | Eduardo Bello | | (substituted on) 47' |
| LK | 19 | Matías Alemanno | | (substituted on) 47' |
| FL | 20 | Juan Martín González | | (substituted on) 47' |
| SH | 21 | Gonzalo Bertranou | | (substituted on) 47' |
| FH | 22 | Benjamín Urdapilleta | | (substituted on) 40' |
| CE | 23 | Lucio Cinti | | (substituted on) 68' |
Coach:
(Australia) Michael Cheika

Assistant referees:
Nika Amashukeli (Georgia)
Jordan Way (Australia)
Television match official:
Brian MacNeice (Ireland)

Notes:

- This was New Zealand's biggest win over Argentina since 28 June 1997, also in Hamilton, where they won 62–10.

3 September 2022
19:35 AEST (UTC+10)

| Australia | 8–24 | South Africa (1 BP) |
| Try: Samu 78' m Pen: Lolesio (1/1) 31' | Report | Try: de Allende 8' c Moodie 38' m Mostert 42' m Mapimpi 70' c Con: Willemse (1/3) 10'; Steyn (1/1) 71' |

Sydney Football Stadium, Sydney
Attendance: 38,292
Referee: Ben O'Keeffe (New Zealand)

| FB | 15 | Reece Hodge |
| RW | 14 | Tom Wright |
| OC | 13 | Len Ikitau |
| IC | 12 | Hunter Paisami | | (substituted off) 26' |
| LW | 11 | Marika Koroibete |
| FH | 10 | Noah Lolesio | | (substituted off) 45' |
| SH | 9 | Nic White |
| N8 | 8 | Rob Valetini |
| OF | 7 | Fraser McReight | | (substituted off) 56' |
| BF | 6 | Jed Holloway |
| RL | 5 | Matt Philip | (yellow card) 9' to 19' | (substituted off) 64' |
| LL | 4 | Rory Arnold | | (substituted off) 56' |
| TP | 3 | Allan Alaalatoa |
| HK | 2 | Folau Fainga'a | | (substituted off) 64' |
| LP | 1 | James Slipper (c) | | (substituted off) 64' |
Replacements:
| HK | 16 | Dave Porecki | | (substituted on) 64' |
| PR | 17 | Scott Sio | | (substituted on) 64' |
| PR | 18 | Taniela Tupou |
| LK | 19 | Darcy Swain | | (substituted on) 56' |
| FL | 20 | Rob Leota | | (substituted on) 64' |
| FL | 21 | Pete Samu | | (substituted on) 56' |
| SH | 22 | Jake Gordon | | (substituted on) 45' |
| WG | 23 | Andrew Kellaway | | (substituted on) 26' |
Coach:
(New Zealand) Dave Rennie

| FB | 15 | Willie le Roux | (yellow card) 78' |
| RW | 14 | Canan Moodie |
| OC | 13 | Jesse Kriel | | (substituted off) 70' |
| IC | 12 | Damian de Allende |
| LW | 11 | Makazole Mapimpi | (yellow card) 70' |
| FH | 10 | Damian Willemse |
| SH | 9 | Jaden Hendrikse | | (substituted off) 71' |
| N8 | 8 | Jasper Wiese | | (substituted off) 60' |
| BF | 7 | Franco Mostert |
| OF | 6 | Siya Kolisi (c) | | (substituted off) 71' |
| RL | 5 | Lood de Jager | | (substituted off) 61' |
| LL | 4 | Eben Etzebeth |
| TP | 3 | Frans Malherbe | | (substituted off) 64' |
| HK | 2 | Malcolm Marx |
| LP | 1 | Steven Kitshoff | | (substituted off) 71' |
Replacements:
| HK | 16 | Deon Fourie | | (substituted on) 71' |
| PR | 17 | Ox Nché | | (substituted on) 71' |
| PR | 18 | Trevor Nyakane | | (substituted on) 64' |
| FL | 19 | Kwagga Smith | | (substituted on) 61' |
| N8 | 20 | Duane Vermeulen | | (substituted on) 60' |
| SH | 21 | Cobus Reinach | | (substituted on) 71' |
| FB | 22 | François Steyn | | (substituted on) 70' |
| FB | 23 | Warrick Gelant |
Coach:
(South Africa) Jacques Nienaber

Assistant referees:
Paul Williams (New Zealand)
Tual Trainini (France)
Television match official:
Brendon Pickerill (New Zealand)

Notes:

- Taniela Tupou (Australia) was not used as a sub after suffering an injury in a warm-up during the game.
- This was the first test match at the newly opened Sydney Football Stadium.
- This was the first test match that South Africa had won in Australia since 2013.
- Canan Moodie (South Africa) made his international debut and scored a try.

=== Round 5 ===
15 September 2022
19:45 AEST (UTC+10)

| (1 BP) Australia | 37–39 | New Zealand |
| Try: Valetini 25' c Kellaway (2) 60' c, 66' c Samu 72' c Con: Foley (4/4) 26', 62', 67', 73'; Pen: Foley (2/2) 17', 47'; White (1/1) 77' | Report | Try: Taukei'aho (2) 3' c, 40' c Mo'unga 51' c Jordan 54' c J. Barrett 80' m Con: Mo'unga (4/5) 4', 42', 52', 55'; Pen: Mo'unga (2/2) 11', 70' |

Docklands Stadium, Melbourne
Attendance: 53,343
Referee: Mathieu Raynal (France)

| FB | 15 | Andrew Kellaway |
| RW | 14 | Tom Wright | (yellow card) 34' to 44' | (substituted off) 61' |
| OC | 13 | Len Ikitau | | (substituted off) 52' | (substituted on) 61' |
| IC | 12 | Lalakai Foketi |
| LW | 11 | Marika Koroibete |
| FH | 10 | Bernard Foley |
| SH | 9 | Jake Gordon | (yellow card) 50' to 60' | | (substituted off) 61' |
| N8 | 8 | Rob Valetini |
| OF | 7 | Pete Samu |
| BF | 6 | Rob Leota | | (substituted off) 34' |
| RL | 5 | Matt Philip | | (substituted off) 50' |
| LL | 4 | Jed Holloway |
| TP | 3 | Allan Alaalatoa | | (substituted off) 71' |
| HK | 2 | Dave Porecki | | (substituted off) 56' |
| LP | 1 | James Slipper (c) | | (substituted off) 40' |
Replacements:
| HK | 16 | Folau Fainga'a | | (substituted on) 56' |
| PR | 17 | Scott Sio | | (substituted on) 40' |
| PR | 18 | Pone Fa'amausili | | (substituted on) 71' |
| LK | 19 | Darcy Swain | (yellow card) 35' to 45' | (substituted on) 34' |
| FL | 20 | Fraser McReight | | (substituted on) 50' |
| SH | 21 | Nic White | | (substituted on) 52' |
| FB | 22 | Reece Hodge |
| CE | 23 | Jordan Petaia | | (substituted on) 61' |
Coach:
(New Zealand) Dave Rennie

| FB | 15 | Jordie Barrett |
| RW | 14 | Will Jordan |
| OC | 13 | Rieko Ioane |
| IC | 12 | David Havili | | (substituted off) 13' |
| LW | 11 | Caleb Clarke |
| FH | 10 | Richie Mo'unga |
| SH | 9 | Aaron Smith | | (substituted off) 74' |
| N8 | 8 | Hoskins Sotutu | | (substituted off) 68' |
| OF | 7 | Sam Cane (c) | | (substituted off) 23' |
| BF | 6 | Scott Barrett |
| RL | 5 | Sam Whitelock |
| LL | 4 | Brodie Retallick |
| TP | 3 | Tyrel Lomax | | (substituted off) 57' |
| HK | 2 | Samisoni Taukei'aho | | (substituted off) 61' |
| LP | 1 | Ethan de Groot | | (substituted off) 50' |
Replacements:
| HK | 16 | Dane Coles | | (substituted on) 61' |
| PR | 17 | George Bower | | (substituted on) 50' |
| PR | 18 | Fletcher Newell | | (substituted on) 57' |
| FK | 19 | Akira Ioane | | (substituted on) 68' |
| FL | 20 | Dalton Papalii | (yellow card) 24' to 34' | (substituted on) 23' |
| SH | 21 | Finlay Christie | | (substituted on) 74' |
| FH | 22 | Beauden Barrett | | | (substituted on) 35' |
| CE | 23 | Quinn Tupaea | | (substituted on) 13' | (substituted off) 35' |
Coach:
(New Zealand) Ian Foster

Player of the Match:
Samisoni Taukei'aho (New Zealand)

Assistant referees:
Andrew Brace (Ireland)
Pierre Brousset (France)
Television match official:
Ben Whitehouse (Wales)

Notes:

- Marika Koroibete (Australia) earned his 50th test cap.
- New Zealand retain the Bledisloe Cup.

17 September 2022
16:10 AST (UTC−3)

| Argentina | 20–36 | South Africa (1 BP) |
| Try: Penalty try 65'; Moroni 68' c Con: Boffelli (1/1) 68'; Pen: Boffelli (2/3) 8', 23' | Report | Try: Penalty try 20'; Hendrikse 27' c Marx (2) 32' m, 79' c de Allende 74' c Con: Willemse (1/2) 28'; Steyn (2/2) 75', 80+1'; Pen: Willemse (1/2) 11' |

Estadio Libertadores de América, Buenos Aires (Note: The Argentina vs. South Africa match was originally scheduled to be played at the José Amalfitani Stadium in the Buenos Aires neighbourhood of Liniers; however, the venue was changed to the Estadio Libertadores de América in the nearby city of Avellaneda on 14 September as the Argentine Rugby Union determined that the original venue did not meet the "necessary conditions for holding an international rugby match" following an inspection on 12 September.)
Attendance: 34,000
Referee: James Doleman (New Zealand)

| FB | 15 | Juan Cruz Mallía |
| RW | 14 | Emiliano Boffelli |
| OC | 13 | Matías Orlando |
| IC | 12 | Jerónimo de la Fuente |
| LW | 11 | Lucio Cinti | | (substituted off) 40' |
| FH | 10 | Santiago Carreras | (yellow card) 20' to 30' | (substituted off) 75' |
| SH | 9 | Gonzalo Bertranou | (yellow card) 40' to 50' | (substituted off) 50' |
| N8 | 8 | Pablo Matera |
| OF | 7 | Marcos Kremer |
| BF | 6 | Juan Martín González | | (substituted off) 64' |
| RL | 5 | Tomás Lavanini |
| LL | 4 | Matías Alemanno | | (substituted off) 63' |
| TP | 3 | Eduardo Bello] | | (substituted off) 46' |
| HK | 2 | Julián Montoya (c) | | (substituted off) 64' |
| LP | 1 | Nahuel Tetaz Chaparro | | (substituted off) 46' |
Replacements:
| HK | 16 | Agustín Creevy | | (substituted on) 64' |
| PR | 17 | Thomas Gallo | | (substituted on) 46' |
| PR | 18 | Joel Sclavi | | (substituted on) 46' |
| LK | 19 | Guido Petti | | (substituted on) 63' |
| FL | 20 | Rodrigo Bruni | | (substituted on) 64' |
| SH | 21 | Tomás Cubelli | | (substituted on) 40' |
| FH | 22 | Benjamín Urdapilleta | | (substituted on) 75' |
| CE | 23 | Matías Moroni | | (substituted on) 50' |
Coach:
(Australia) Michael Cheika

| FB | 15 | Willie le Roux | (yellow card) 58' to 68' |
| RW | 14 | Canan Moodie |
| OC | 13 | Jesse Kriel | | (substituted off) 75' |
| IC | 12 | Damian de Allende |
| LW | 11 | Makazole Mapimpi |
| FH | 10 | Damian Willemse | | (substituted off) 64' |
| SH | 9 | Jaden Hendrikse | | (substituted off) 59' |
| N8 | 8 | Jasper Wiese | | (substituted off) 51' |
| BF | 7 | Franco Mostert |
| OF | 6 | Siya Kolisi (c) | | (substituted off) 59' |
| RL | 5 | Lood de Jager | | (substituted off) 51' |
| LL | 4 | Eben Etzebeth |
| TP | 3 | Frans Malherbe | | (substituted off) 58' |
| HK | 2 | Malcolm Marx |
| LP | 1 | Steven Kitshoff | | (substituted off) 66' |
Replacements:
| HK | 16 | Deon Fourie | | (substituted on) 59' |
| PR | 17 | Ox Nché | | (substituted on) 66' |
| PR | 18 | Trevor Nyakane | | (substituted on) 58' |
| FL | 19 | Elrigh Louw | | (substituted on) 51' |
| FL | 20 | Kwagga Smith | (yellow card) 64' to 74' | (substituted on) 51' |
| SH | 21 | Faf de Klerk | | (substituted on) 59' |
| CE | 22 | André Esterhuizen | | (substituted on) 75' |
| FB | 23 | François Steyn | | (substituted on) 64' |
Coach:
(South Africa) Jacques Nienaber

Player of the Match:
Malcolm Marx (South Africa)

Assistant referees:
Damon Murphy (Australia)
Craig Evans (Wales)
Television match official:
Chris Hart (New Zealand)

Notes:

- It was the first international rugby match at the Estadio Libertadores de América. The game was originally scheduled for the Estadio José Amalfitani, Argentina's usual Buenos Aires ground, but a failed pitch inspection forced a move to la Doble Visera, the home of soccer giants Club Atlético Independiente.
- Agustín Creevy (Argentina) earnt his 95th cap, becoming the most capped Argentina player.

=== Round 6 ===
24 September 2022
19:05 NZST (UTC+12)

| (1 BP) New Zealand | 40–14 | Australia |
| Try: Jordan 22' c Penalty try 26'; Whitelock 42' c Taylor 53' m Taukei'aho 64' m Con: Mo'unga (2/4) 24', 42'; Pen: Mo'unga (3/3) 20', 46', 76' | Report | Try: Fainga'a 58' c Petaia 80+2' c Con: Foley (1/1) 59'; Hodge (1/1) 80+3' |

Eden Park, Auckland
Attendance: 47,000
Referee: Andrew Brace (Ireland)

| FB | 15 | Beauden Barrett |
| RW | 14 | Will Jordan | (substituted off) 67' |
| OC | 13 | Rieko Ioane |
| IC | 12 | Jordie Barrett |
| LW | 11 | Caleb Clarke |
| FH | 10 | Richie Mo'unga | (substituted off) 69' |
| SH | 9 | Aaron Smith | (substituted off) 56' |
| N8 | 8 | Ardie Savea |
| OF | 7 | Dalton Papalii |
| BF | 6 | Akira Ioane | (substituted off) 69' |
| RL | 5 | Sam Whitelock (c) |
| LL | 4 | Brodie Retallick | (substituted off) 67' |
| TP | 3 | Tyrel Lomax | (substituted off) 56' |
| HK | 2 | Codie Taylor | (substituted off) 56' |
| LP | 1 | Ethan de Groot | (substituted off) 56' |
Replacements:
| HK | 16 | Samisoni Taukei'aho | (substituted on) 56' |
| PR | 17 | Ofa Tu'ungafasi | (substituted on) 56' |
| PR | 18 | Nepo Laulala | (substituted on) 56' |
| LK | 19 | Tupou Vaa'i | (substituted on) 67' |
| FL | 20 | Hoskins Sotutu | (substituted on) 69' |
| SH | 21 | Finlay Christie | (substituted on) 56' |
| FH | 22 | Roger Tuivasa-Sheck | (substituted on) 69' |
| WG | 23 | Sevu Reece | (substituted on) 67' |
Coach:
(New Zealand) Ian Foster

| FB | 15 | Andrew Kellaway | | (substituted off) 67' | (substituted on) 74' |
| RW | 14 | Tom Wright |
| OC | 13 | Len Ikitau |
| IC | 12 | Lalakai Foketi | | (substituted off) 21' |
| LW | 11 | Marika Koroibete |
| FH | 10 | Bernard Foley | | | (substituted off) 74' |
| SH | 9 | Jake Gordon | | (substituted off) 47' |
| N8 | 8 | Harry Wilson | | (substituted off) 47' |
| OF | 7 | Pete Samu |
| BF | 6 | Rob Valetini |
| RL | 5 | Cadeyrn Neville |
| LL | 4 | Jed Holloway | (yellow card) 1' to 11' | (substituted off) 47' |
| TP | 3 | Allan Alaalatoa | | (substituted off) 65' |
| HK | 2 | Dave Porecki | (yellow card) 26' to 36' | (substituted off) 57' |
| LP | 1 | James Slipper (c) | | (substituted off) 40' |
Replacements:
| HK | 16 | Folau Fainga'a | | (substituted on) 57' |
| PR | 17 | Angus Bell | | (substituted on) 40' |
| PR | 18 | Pone Fa'amausili | | (substituted on) 65' |
| LK | 19 | Nick Frost | | (substituted on) 47' |
| FL | 20 | Fraser McReight | | (substituted on) 47' |
| SH | 21 | Nic White | | (substituted on) 47' |
| FB | 22 | Reece Hodge | | (substituted on) 67' |
| CE | 23 | Jordan Petaia | | (substituted on) 21' |
Coach:
(New Zealand) Dave Rennie

Player of the Match:
Jordie Barrett (New Zealand)

Assistant referees:
Mathieu Raynal (France)
Pierre Brousset (France)
Television match official:
Ben Whitehouse (Wales)

Notes:

- Fletcher Newell (New Zealand) had been named on the bench but withdrew ahead of the game and was replaced by Nepo Laulala.
- With this loss for Australia, the Wallabies drop to 9th in the World Rugby Rankings, their lowest ever ranking.

24 September 2022
17:05 SAST (UTC+2)

| South Africa | 38–21 | Argentina |
| Try: Wiese 18' c Kolisi 28' c Penalty try (2) 54', 72'; Arendse 80+1' c Con: Steyn (3/3) 19', 29', 80+2'; Pen: Steyn (1/1) 37' | Report | Try: Bertranou 39' c González 46' c Moroni 67' c Con: Boffelli (3/3) 40', 47', 68' |

Kings Park Stadium, Durban
Attendance: 45,982
Referee: Damon Murphy (Australia)

| FB | 15 | Willie le Roux | | (substituted off) 52' |
| RW | 14 | Canan Moodie |
| OC | 13 | Jesse Kriel |
| IC | 12 | Damian de Allende |
| LW | 11 | Makazole Mapimpi |
| FH | 10 | François Steyn |
| SH | 9 | Jaden Hendrikse | | (substituted off) 61' |
| N8 | 8 | Jasper Wiese | | (substituted off) 48' |
| BF | 7 | Pieter-Steph du Toit | | (substituted off) 48' |
| OF | 6 | Siya Kolisi (c) |
| RL | 5 | Lood de Jager | | (substituted off) 70' |
| LL | 4 | Eben Etzebeth | (yellow card) 59' to 69' |
| TP | 3 | Frans Malherbe | | (substituted off) 57' |
| HK | 2 | Malcolm Marx | | (substituted off) 68' |
| LP | 1 | Steven Kitshoff | | (substituted off) 57' |
Replacements:
| HK | 16 | Bongi Mbonambi | | (substituted on) 68' |
| PR | 17 | Ox Nché | | (substituted on) 57' |
| PR | 18 | Vincent Koch | | (substituted on) 57' |
| LK | 19 | Franco Mostert | | (substituted on) 70' |
| N8 | 20 | Duane Vermeulen | | (substituted on) 48' |
| FL | 21 | Kwagga Smith | | (substituted on) 48' |
| SH | 22 | Faf de Klerk | (yellow card) 64' to 74' | (substituted on) 61' |
| WG | 23 | Kurt-Lee Arendse | | (substituted on) 52' |
Coach:
(South Africa) Jacques Nienaber

| FB | 15 | Juan Cruz Mallía |
| RW | 14 | Emiliano Boffelli |
| OC | 13 | Matías Moroni |
| IC | 12 | Jerónimo de la Fuente | (yellow card) 54' to 64' | | (substituted off) 73' |
| LW | 11 | Juan Imhoff | | (substituted off) 55' |
| FH | 10 | Santiago Carreras | | (substituted off) 58' |
| SH | 9 | Gonzalo Bertranou | | (substituted off) 63' |
| N8 | 8 | Pablo Matera | | (substituted off) 29' |
| OF | 7 | Marcos Kremer | (yellow card) 15' to 25' |
| BF | 6 | Juan Martín González | (yellow card) 26' to 36' |
| RL | 5 | Tomás Lavanini |
| LL | 4 | Matías Alemanno |
| TP | 3 | Eduardo Bello | | (substituted off) 29' | (substituted on) 73' |
| HK | 2 | Julián Montoya (c) | | (substituted off) 65' |
| LP | 1 | Nahuel Tetaz Chaparro | | (substituted off) 55' | (substituted on) 76' |
Replacements:
| HK | 16 | Agustín Creevy | | (substituted on) 65' |
| PR | 17 | Mayco Vivas | | (substituted on) 55' | (substituted off) 76' |
| PR | 18 | Joel Sclavi | (yellow card) 72' | (substituted on) 29' |
| LK | 19 | Guido Petti | | (substituted on) 29' | (substituted off) 59' |
| FL | 20 | Pedro Rubiolo | | | (substituted on) 59' |
| SH | 21 | Tomás Cubelli | | (substituted on) 63' |
| FH | 22 | Benjamín Urdapilleta | | (substituted on) 58' |
| WG | 23 | Bautista Delguy | | (substituted on) 55' |
Coach:
(Australia) Michael Cheika

Assistant referees:
Frank Murphy (Ireland)
Andrea Piardi (Italy)
Television match official:
Chris Hart (New Zealand)

== Statistics ==
=== Points scorers ===
| Pos. | Name | Team | Pts. |
|---|---|---|---|
| 1 | Emiliano Boffelli | Argentina | 71 |
| 1 | Richie Mo'unga | New Zealand | 71 |
| 3 | Handré Pollard | South Africa | 32 |
| 4 | Samisoni Taukei'aho | New Zealand | 25 |
| 5 | Juan Martín González | Argentina | 20 |
| 6 | Jordie Barrett | New Zealand | 17 |
| 7 | Bernard Foley | Australia | 16 |
| 8 | Fraser McReight | Australia | 15 |
| 8 | François Steyn | South Africa | 15 |
| 10 | Noah Lolesio | Australia | 13 |

=== Try scorers ===
| Pos. | Name | Team | Tri. |
|---|---|---|---|
| 1 | Samisoni Taukei'aho | New Zealand | 5 |
| 2 | Juan Martín González | Argentina | 4 |
| 3 | Fraser McReight | Australia | 3 |
| 4 | Kurt-Lee Arendse | South Africa | 2 |
| 4 | Jordie Barrett | New Zealand | 2 |
| 4 | Caleb Clarke | New Zealand | 2 |
| 4 | Damian de Allende | South Africa | 2 |
| 4 | Folau Fainga'a | Australia | 2 |
| 4 | Thomas Gallo | Argentina | 2 |
| 4 | Len Ikitau | Australia | 2 |
| 4 | Will Jordan | New Zealand | 2 |
| 4 | Andrew Kellaway | Australia | 2 |
| 4 | Makazole Mapimpi | South Africa | 2 |
| 4 | Malcolm Marx | South Africa | 2 |
| 4 | Matías Moroni | Argentina | 2 |
| 4 | Jordan Petaia | Australia | 2 |
| 4 | Pete Samu | Australia | 2 |
| 4 | Kwagga Smith | South Africa | 2 |

== Squads ==
=== Summary ===
| Nation | Match venues | | | Head coach | Captain |
| Nation | Name | City | Capacity | Head coach | Captain |
|---|---|---|---|---|---|
| Argentina | Libertadores de América Stadium | Buenos Aires | 42,069 | Michael Cheika | Julián Montoya |
| Argentina | Estadio Malvinas Argentinas | Mendoza | 42,000 | Michael Cheika | Julián Montoya |
| Argentina | Estadio San Juan del Bicentenario | San Juan | 25,286 | Michael Cheika | Julián Montoya |
| Australia | Adelaide Oval | Adelaide | 53,500 | Dave Rennie | Michael Hooper (Note: Michael Hooper was selected and named captain of the Wallabies in the initial squad for the first test against Argentina in round one, however less than forty-eight hours before kick-off, Hooper withdrew from the squad, citing personal reasons. James Slipper was named captain for the remainder of Hooper's sabbatical.); James Slipper |
| Australia | Marvel Stadium | Melbourne | 53,343 | Dave Rennie | Michael Hooper; James Slipper |
| Australia | Allianz Stadium | Sydney | 45,000 | Dave Rennie | Michael Hooper; James Slipper |
| New Zealand | Eden Park | Auckland | 50,000 | Ian Foster | Sam Cane (Note: In the round five match between Australia and New Zealand, Cane failed a Head Injury Assessment (HIA) in the first-half and the captaincy was replaced by Sam Whitelock.); Sam Whitelock (acting) |
| New Zealand | FMG Stadium Waikato | Hamilton | 25,800 | Ian Foster | Sam Cane; Sam Whitelock (acting) |
| New Zealand | Orangetheory Stadium | Christchurch | 18,000 | Ian Foster | Sam Cane; Sam Whitelock (acting) |
| South Africa | Emirates Airline Park | Johannesburg | 62,567 | Jacques Nienaber | Siya Kolisi |
| South Africa | Hollywoodbets Kings Park | Durban | 52,000 | Jacques Nienaber | Siya Kolisi |
| South Africa | Mbombela Stadium | Mbombela | 40,929 | Jacques Nienaber | Siya Kolisi |

Note: Ages, caps and clubs/franchises are of 6 August 2022 – the starting date of the tournament

=== Argentina ===
On 21 July, Argentina announced a 34-man squad for the Rugby Championship.

On 14 August, Eduardo Bello, Bautista Delguy, Guido Petti and Santiago Socino joined the squad ahead of their tour to New Zealand in rounds 3 & 4.

On 20 August, Mateo Carreras was a late addition to the travelling squad to New Zealand.

On 7 September, Michael Cheika named a revised squad for the final 2 matches against South Africa.

Note: Flags indicate national union for the club/province as defined by World Rugby.

| Player | Position | Date of birth (age) | Caps | Club/province |
|---|---|---|---|---|
| Agustin Creevy | Hooker | 15 March 1985 (aged 37) | 88 | (England) London Irish |
| Julián Montoya (c) | Hooker | 29 October 1993 (aged 28) | 76 | (England) Leicester Tigers |
| Ignacio Ruiz | Hooker | 3 January 2001 (aged 21) | 1 | (Argentina) Jaguares XV |
| Santiago Socino | Hooker | 7 May 1992 (aged 30) | 2 | (England) Gloucester |
| Eduardo Bello | Prop | 27 November 1995 (aged 26) | 2 | (England) Saracens |
| Thomas Gallo | Prop | 30 April 1999 (aged 23) | 5 | (Italy) Benetton |
| Francisco Gómez Kodela | Prop | 7 July 1985 (aged 37) | 22 | (France) Lyon |
| Santiago Medrano | Prop | 6 May 1996 (aged 26) | 32 | (Australia) Western Force |
| Joel Sclavi | Prop | 25 June 1994 (aged 28) | 3 | (France) La Rochelle |
| Nahuel Tetaz Chaparro | Prop | 11 June 1989 (aged 33) | 70 | (Italy) Benetton |
| Mayco Vivas | Prop | 2 June 1998 (aged 24) | 6 | (Argentina) Jaguares XV |
| Matías Alemanno | Lock | 5 December 1991 (aged 30) | 64 | (England) Gloucester |
| Marcos Kremer | Lock | 30 July 1997 (aged 25) | 46 | (France) Stade Français |
| Tomás Lavanini | Lock | 22 January 1993 (aged 29) | 67 | (France) Clermont |
| Lucas Paulos | Lock | 9 January 1998 (aged 24) | 6 | (France) Brive |
| Guido Petti | Lock | 17 November 1994 (aged 27) | 68 | (France) Bordeaux Begles |
| Rodrigo Bruni | Back row | 3 September 1993 (aged 28) | 18 | (France) Brive |
| Juan Martín González | Back row | 14 November 2000 (aged 21) | 11 | (England) London Irish |
| Santiago Grondona | Back row | 25 July 1998 (aged 24) | 6 | (England) Exeter Chiefs |
| Facundo Isa | Back row | 21 September 1993 (aged 28) | 39 | (France) Toulon |
| Pablo Matera | Back row | 18 July 1993 (aged 29) | 81 | (New Zealand) Crusaders |
| Joaquín Oviedo | Back row | 17 July 2001 (aged 21) | 0 | (France) Perpignan |
| Lautaro Bazán | Scrum-half | 24 February 1996 (aged 26) | 1 | (Italy) Rovigo Delta |
| Gonzalo Bertranou | Scrum-half | 31 December 1993 (aged 28) | 39 | (Wales) Dragons |
| Tomás Cubelli | Scrum-half | 12 June 1989 (aged 33) | 81 | (France) Biarritz |
| Nicolás Sánchez | Fly-half | 26 October 1988 (aged 33) | 93 | (France) Stade Français |
| Benjamín Urdapilleta | Fly-half | 11 March 1986 (aged 36) | 16 | (France) Castres |
| Lucio Cinti | Centre | 23 February 2000 (aged 22) | 7 | (England) London Irish |
| Jerónimo de la Fuente | Centre | 24 February 1991 (aged 31) | 66 | (France) Perpignan |
| Lucas Mensa | Centre | 24 May 1996 (aged 26) | 2 | (France) Stade Montois |
| Matías Moroni | Centre | 29 March 1991 (aged 31) | 60 | (England) Newcastle Falcons |
| Matías Orlando | Centre | 14 November 1991 (aged 30) | 44 | (England) Newcastle Falcons |
| Emiliano Boffelli | Wing | 16 January 1995 (aged 27) | 43 | (Scotland) Edinburgh |
| Mateo Carreras | Wing | 17 December 1999 (aged 22) | 3 | (England) Newcastle Falcons |
| Santiago Cordero | Wing | 6 December 1993 (aged 28) | 46 | (France) Bordeaux |
| Bautista Delguy | Wing | 22 April 1997 (aged 25) | 23 | (France) Clermont |
| Juan Imhoff | Wing | 11 March 1988 (aged 34) | 39 | (France) Racing 92 |
| Juan Cruz Mallia | Fullback | 11 September 1996 (aged 25) | 3 | (France) Toulouse |
| Santiago Carreras | Fullback | 30 March 1998 (aged 24) | 21 | (England) Gloucester |

=== Australia ===
On 21 July, Dave Rennie confirmed a 36-player squad for the opening 2 rounds of the Rugby Championship.

Scott Sio has been ruled out due to a shoulder injury, Tom Robertson was called into the squad as his replacement.

Dave Porecki was ruled out of the Argentine tour due to injury and Billy Pollard was called up to replace him on tour.

On 18 August, Bernard Foley and Langi Gleeson was added to the squad for Australia's round three and four matches against South Africa.

On 8 September, Kurtley Beale and Cadeyrn Neville were called up for the Bledisloe Cup series in rounds five and six.

| Player | Position | Date of birth (age) | Caps | Club/province |
|---|---|---|---|---|
| Folau Fainga'a | Hooker | 5 May 1995 (aged 27) | 28 | (Australia) Brumbies |
| Lachlan Lonergan | Hooker | 11 October 1999 (aged 22) | 4 | (Australia) Brumbies |
| Billy Pollard | Hooker | 9 December 2001 (aged 20) | 0 | (Australia) Brumbies |
| Dave Porecki | Hooker | 23 October 1992 (aged 29) | 3 | (Australia) Waratahs |
| Allan Alaalatoa | Prop | 28 January 1994 (aged 28) | 55 | (Australia) Brumbies |
| Pone Fa'amausili | Prop | 26 February 1997 (aged 25) | 0 | (Australia) Rebels |
| Matt Gibbon | Prop | 3 June 1995 (aged 27) | 0 | (Australia) Rebels |
| Scott Sio | Prop | 16 October 1991 (aged 30) | 70 | (Australia) Brumbies |
| Tom Robertson | Prop | 28 August 1994 (aged 27) | 26 | (Australia) Western Force |
| James Slipper | Prop | 6 June 1989 (aged 33) | 117 | (Australia) Brumbies |
| Taniela Tupou | Prop | 10 May 1996 (aged 26) | 40 | (Australia) Reds |
| Rory Arnold | Lock | 1 July 1990 (aged 32) | 29 | Unattached |
| Nick Frost | Lock | 10 October 1999 (aged 22) | 2 | (Australia) Brumbies |
| Jed Holloway | Lock | 2 November 1992 (aged 29) | 0 | (Australia) Waratahs |
| Cadeyrn Neville | Lock | 9 November 1988 (aged 33) | 2 | (Australia) Brumbies |
| Matt Philip | Lock | 7 March 1994 (aged 28) | 23 | (Australia) Rebels |
| Darcy Swain | Lock | 5 July 1997 (aged 25) | 11 | (Australia) Brumbies |
| Langi Gleeson | Back row | 21 July 2001 (aged 21) | 0 | (Australia) Waratahs |
| Michael Hooper | Back row | 29 October 1991 (aged 30) | 121 | (Australia) Waratahs |
| Rob Leota | Back row | 3 March 1997 (aged 25) | 9 | (Australia) Rebels |
| Fraser McReight | Back row | 19 February 1999 (aged 23) | 2 | (Australia) Reds |
| Pete Samu | Back row | 17 December 1991 (aged 30) | 22 | (Australia) Brumbies |
| Rob Valetini | Back row | 3 September 1998 (aged 23) | 21 | (Australia) Brumbies |
| Harry Wilson | Back row | 22 November 1999 (aged 22) | 11 | (Australia) Reds |
| Jake Gordon | Scrum-half | 7 June 1993 (aged 29) | 12 | (Australia) Waratahs |
| Tate McDermott | Scrum-half | 18 September 1998 (aged 23) | 16 | (Australia) Reds |
| Nic White | Scrum-half | 13 June 1990 (aged 32) | 50 | (Australia) Brumbies |
| Kurtley Beale | Fly-half | 6 January 1989 (aged 33) | 95 | (Australia) Waratahs |
| Quade Cooper | Fly-half | 5 April 1988 (aged 34) | 75 | (Japan) Kintetsu Liners |
| Bernard Foley | Fly-half | 8 September 1989 (aged 32) | 71 | (Japan) Kubota Spears |
| Noah Lolesio | Fly-half | 18 December 1999 (aged 22) | 12 | (Australia) Brumbies |
| James O'Connor | Fly-half | 5 July 1990 (aged 32) | 63 | (Australia) Reds |
| Lalakai Foketi | Centre | 22 December 1994 (aged 27) | 1 | (Australia) Waratahs |
| Len Ikitau | Centre | 1 October 1998 (aged 23) | 15 | (Australia) Brumbies |
| Hunter Paisami | Centre | 10 April 1998 (aged 24) | 17 | (Australia) Reds |
| Irae Simone | Centre | 10 July 1995 (aged 27) | 2 | (Australia) Brumbies |
| Marika Koroibete | Wing | 26 July 1992 (aged 30) | 45 | (Japan) Saitama Wild Knights |
| Jordan Petaia | Wing | 14 March 2000 (aged 22) | 18 | (Australia) Reds |
| Suliasi Vunivalu | Wing | 27 November 1995 (aged 26) | 1 | (Australia) Reds |
| Tom Wright | Wing | 21 July 1997 (aged 25) | 12 | (Australia) Brumbies |
| Jock Campbell | Fullback | 17 May 1995 (aged 27) | 0 | (Australia) Reds |
| Reece Hodge | Fullback | 26 August 1994 (aged 27) | 55 | (Australia) Rebels |

=== New Zealand ===
On 26 July, Fletcher Newell was called into the squad as a replacement for Ofa Tu'ungafasi who suffered a neck injury after the Steinlager Series.

On 5 September, Braydon Ennor and Luke Jacobson were added to the squad for New Zealand's round 5 clash against Australia.

| Player | Position | Date of birth (age) | Caps | Franchise/province |
|---|---|---|---|---|
| Dane Coles | Hooker | 10 December 1986 (aged 35) | 81 | Hurricanes / Wellington |
| Samisoni Taukei'aho | Hooker | 8 August 1997 (aged 24) | 11 | Chiefs / Waikato |
| Codie Taylor | Hooker | 31 March 1991 (aged 31) | 69 | Crusaders / Canterbury |
| Aidan Ross | Prop | 25 October 1995 (aged 26) | 1 | Chiefs / Bay of Plenty |
| George Bower | Prop | 28 May 1992 (aged 30) | 14 | Crusaders / Otago |
| Nepo Laulala | Prop | 6 November 1991 (aged 30) | 41 | Blues / Counties Manukau |
| Angus Ta'avao | Prop | 22 March 1990 (aged 32) | 22 | Chiefs / Auckland |
| Ofa Tu'ungafasi | Prop | 19 April 1992 (aged 30) | 47 | Blues / Northland |
| Ethan de Groot | Prop | 22 July 1998 (aged 24) | 4 | Highlanders / Southland |
| Fletcher Newell | Prop | 1 March 2000 (aged 22) | 0 | Crusaders / Canterbury |
| Scott Barrett | Lock | 20 November 1993 (aged 28) | 50 | Crusaders / Taranaki |
| Brodie Retallick | Lock | 31 May 1991 (aged 31) | 95 | Chiefs / Hawke's Bay |
| Patrick Tuipulotu | Lock | 23 January 1993 (aged 29) | 42 | Blues / Auckland |
| Tupou Vaa'i | Lock | 27 January 2000 (aged 22) | 12 | Chiefs / Taranaki |
| Sam Whitelock | Lock | 12 October 1988 (aged 33) | 134 | Crusaders / Canterbury |
| Sam Cane (c) | Loose forward | 13 January 1992 (aged 30) | 80 | Chiefs / Bay of Plenty |
| Shannon Frizell | Loose forward | 11 February 1994 (aged 28) | 17 | Highlanders / Tasman |
| Luke Jacobson | Loose forward | 20 April 1997 (aged 25) | 12 | Chiefs / Waikato |
| Akira Ioane | Loose forward | 16 June 1995 (aged 27) | 14 | Blues / Auckland |
| Dalton Papalii | Loose forward | 11 October 1997 (aged 24) | 15 | Blues / Counties Manukau |
| Ardie Savea | Loose forward | 14 October 1993 (aged 28) | 62 | Hurricanes / Wellington |
| Hoskins Sotutu | Loose forward | 12 July 1998 (aged 24) | 10 | Blues / Counties Manukau |
| Finlay Christie | Half-back | 19 September 1995 (aged 26) | 6 | Blues / Tasman |
| Folau Fakatava | Half-back | 16 December 1999 (aged 22) | 2 | Highlanders / Hawke's Bay |
| Aaron Smith | Half-back | 21 November 1988 (aged 33) | 105 | Highlanders / Manawatu |
| Beauden Barrett | First five-eighth | 27 May 1991 (aged 31) | 104 | Blues / Taranaki |
| Richie Mo'unga | First five-eighth | 25 May 1994 (aged 28) | 35 | Crusaders / Canterbury |
| Stephen Perofeta | First five-eighth | 12 March 1997 (aged 25) | 0 | Blues / Taranaki |
| Braydon Ennor | Centre | 16 July 1997 (aged 25) | 18 | Crusaders / Canterbury |
| Jack Goodhue | Centre | 13 May 1995 (aged 27) | 18 | Crusaders / Northland |
| David Havili | Centre | 23 December 1994 (aged 27) | 16 | Crusaders / Tasman |
| Rieko Ioane | Centre | 18 March 1997 (aged 25) | 50 | Blues / Auckland |
| Roger Tuivasa-Sheck | Centre | 5 June 1993 (aged 29) | 1 | Blues / Auckland |
| Quinn Tupaea | Centre | 10 May 1999 (aged 23) | 9 | Chiefs / Waikato |
| Caleb Clarke | Wing | 29 March 1999 (aged 23) | 5 | Blues / Auckland |
| Leicester Fainga'anuku | Wing | 11 October 1999 (aged 22) | 2 | Crusaders / Tasman |
| Will Jordan | Wing | 24 February 1998 (aged 24) | 15 | Crusaders / Tasman |
| Sevu Reece | Wing | 13 February 1997 (aged 25) | 20 | Crusaders / Tasman |
| Jordie Barrett | Fullback | 17 February 1997 (aged 25) | 39 | Hurricanes / Taranaki |

=== South Africa ===
On 23 July, head coach Jacques Nienaber named a 41-man squad for the 2022 Rugby Championship.

On 8 August, Canan Moodie was called up to the squad following injury to Kurt-Lee Arendse in the opening round of the Championship.

Head coach: (South Africa) Jacques Nienaber

| Player | Position | Date of birth (age) | Caps | Club/province |
|---|---|---|---|---|
| Joseph Dweba | Hooker | 25 October 1995 (aged 26) | 2 | (South Africa) Stormers |
| Malcolm Marx | Hooker | 13 July 1994 (aged 28) | 49 | (Japan) Kubota Spears |
| Bongi Mbonambi | Hooker | 7 January 1991 (aged 31) | 50 | (South Africa) Sharks |
| Thomas du Toit | Prop | 5 May 1995 (aged 27) | 14 | (South Africa) Sharks |
| Steven Kitshoff | Prop | 10 February 1992 (aged 30) | 61 | (South Africa) Stormers |
| Vincent Koch | Prop | 13 March 1990 (aged 32) | 34 | (England) Wasps |
| Frans Malherbe | Prop | 14 March 1991 (aged 31) | 48 | (South Africa) Stormers |
| Ntuthuko Mchunu | Prop | 5 April 1999 (aged 23) | 1 | (South Africa) Sharks |
| Ox Nché | Prop | 23 July 1995 (aged 27) | 10 | (South Africa) Sharks |
| Trevor Nyakane | Prop | 4 May 1989 (aged 33) | 56 | (France) Racing 92 |
| Lood de Jager | Lock | 17 December 1992 (aged 29) | 58 | (Japan) Saitama Wild Knights |
| Eben Etzebeth | Lock | 29 October 1991 (aged 30) | 100 | (South Africa) Sharks |
| Salmaan Moerat | Lock | 6 March 1998 (aged 24) | 1 | (South Africa) Stormers |
| Franco Mostert | Lock | 27 November 1990 (aged 31) | 53 | (Japan) Mie Honda Heat |
| Ruan Nortjé | Lock | 25 July 1998 (aged 24) | 1 | (South Africa) Bulls |
| Marvin Orie | Lock | 15 February 1993 (aged 29) | 8 | (South Africa) Stormers |
| Pieter-Steph du Toit | Loose forward | 20 August 1992 (aged 29) | 60 | (Japan) Toyota Verblitz |
| Rynhardt Elstadt | Loose forward | 20 October 1989 (aged 32) | 4 | (France) Toulouse |
| Deon Fourie | Loose forward | 25 September 1986 (aged 35) | 1 | (South Africa) Stormers |
| Siya Kolisi (c) | Loose forward | 16 June 1991 (aged 31) | 65 | (South Africa) Sharks |
| Elrigh Louw | Loose forward | 20 October 1999 (aged 22) | 2 | (South Africa) Bulls |
| Evan Roos | Loose forward | 21 January 2000 (aged 22) | 1 | (South Africa) Stormers |
| Kwagga Smith | Loose forward | 11 June 1993 (aged 29) | 21 | (Japan) Shizuoka Blue Revs |
| Jasper Wiese | Loose forward | 21 October 1995 (aged 26) | 13 | (England) Leicester Tigers |
| Duane Vermeulen | Loose forward | 3 July 1986 (aged 36) | 61 | (Ireland) Ulster |
| Faf de Klerk | Scrum-half | 19 October 1991 (aged 30) | 38 | (Japan) Yokohama Canon Eagles |
| Jaden Hendrikse | Scrum-half | 23 March 2000 (aged 22) | 4 | (South Africa) Sharks |
| Herschel Jantjies | Scrum-half | 22 April 1996 (aged 26) | 22 | (South Africa) Stormers |
| Grant Williams | Scrum-half | 22 July 1996 (aged 26) | 1 | (South Africa) Sharks |
| Elton Jantjies | Fly-half | 1 August 1990 (aged 32) | 45 | (Japan) NTT Red Hurricanes |
| Handré Pollard | Fly-half | 11 March 1994 (aged 28) | 62 | (England) Leicester Tigers |
| Lukhanyo Am | Centre | 28 November 1993 (aged 28) | 28 | (South Africa) Sharks |
| Damian de Allende | Centre | 25 November 1991 (aged 30) | 60 | (Japan) Yokohama Canon Eagles |
| André Esterhuizen | Centre | 30 March 1994 (aged 28) | 9 | (England) Harlequins |
| Jesse Kriel | Centre | 15 February 1994 (aged 28) | 52 | (Japan) Yokohama Canon Eagles |
| Kurt-Lee Arendse | Wing | 17 June 1996 (aged 26) | 1 | (South Africa) Bulls |
| Makazole Mapimpi | Wing | 26 July 1990 (aged 32) | 27 | (South Africa) Sharks |
| Canan Moodie | Wing | 5 November 2002 (age 23) | 0 | (South Africa) Bulls |
| Warrick Gelant | Fullback | 20 May 1995 (aged 27) | 10 | (France) Racing 92 |
| Willie le Roux | Fullback | 18 August 1989 (aged 32) | 74 | (Japan) Toyota Verblitz |
| François Steyn | Fullback | 14 May 1987 (aged 35) | 74 | (South Africa) Cheetahs |
| Damian Willemse | Fullback | 7 May 1998 (aged 24) | 18 | (South Africa) Stormers |
