= Michael Cheika =

Australian rugby coach and former player

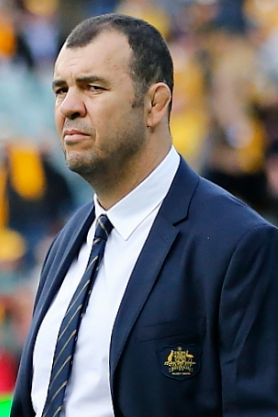
- Cheika representing Australia
- Born: 4 March 1967 (age 59) Sydney, New South Wales, Australia
- School: Marcellin College
- Notable relative: Adam Doueihi (cousin)

Rugby union career
- Position: Number 8
Senior career
Years	Team	Apps	(Points)
1985–1989; 1995–1999	Randwick	286	
1989–1991	Castres		
1991–1992	CASG Paris		
1992–1994	Livorno		
1997	New South Wales		
- Correct as of 15 May 2023
International career
Years	Team	Apps	(Points)
1988	Australia U21		
- Correct as of 15 May 2023
Coaching career
- Years: Team
- 1999–2000: Petrarca Padova
- 2001–2005: Randwick
- 2005–2010: Leinster
- 2010–2012: Stade Français
- 2013–2015: Waratahs
- 2014–2019: Australia
- 2020–2021: Argentina (Assistant)
- 2021–2023: Green Rockets (Director of Rugby)
- 2022–2023: Argentina
- 2024–2025: Leicester Tigers
- 2027–: Waratahs
- Correct as of 7 September 2026
- Rugby league career

Coaching information
Representative
Years	Team	Gms	W	D	L	W%
2022–	Lebanon	8	4	0	4	50
- As of 21 November 2026
Medal record
Men's rugby union
Representing Australia (as coach)
Rugby World Cup
Silver medal – second place	2015 England	Squad

Michael Cheika (born 4 March 1967) is an Australian professional rugby league and rugby union coach, and former rugby union player. He is currently an assistant coach of the Sydney Roosters of the National Rugby League (NRL) and head coach of Lebanon.

In rugby union, Cheika was the coach of the Australia national team from 2014 to 2019, and the Argentina national team between 2022 and the 2023 Rugby World Cup. In 2015, he received the World Rugby Coach of the Year award after leading Australia to the 2015 Rugby World Cup final. He is the only coach to have won the major club competition in each hemisphere, winning the Heineken Cup with Leinster in 2009 and Super Rugby with the New South Wales Waratahs in 2014. Cheika has also been head coach of Padova, Randwick, Stade Français and Leicester Tigers.

In rugby league, he coached Lebanon in the 2021 Rugby League World Cup, and again in the 2026 World Cup.

== Early life ==
Cheika is a second-generation Lebanese Australian. Both his parents immigrated to Australia from Northern Lebanon during the 1950s.

== Playing career ==
Cheika was a number eight who played for Australia at under-21 level. He played more than 300 games for Randwick, winning the Shute Shield seven times during a period when the Galloping Greens dominated Sydney rugby.

As a player, Cheika made a mid-career move to Europe in 1989 where he had two seasons in the South of France with Castres Olympique in Division 1, and a season for Paris team Club Athlétique des Sports Généraux (later merged with Stade Français) in Division 2. He then joined Italian club Rugby Livorno alongside Randwick teammate David Knox from 1992 to 1994. He represented an Italian Selection XV against the All Blacks in 1993.

Returning to Australia, he captained Randwick from 1997 and 1999, and represented New South Wales on their spring tour of the UK in 1997.

== Rugby union coaching ==
=== Padova and Randwick ===
Cheika had never coached before but in 1999 David Campese brought his attention to a coaching job in Italy. He applied for it and was successful. Cheika and Knox coached Petrarca Padova through a Heineken Cup campaign which did not yield any wins.

Cheika returned to Sydney in 2001 when his father fell ill. With European coaching experience under his belt he secured the Randwick coaching ticket and guided his old club to a Shute Shield victory in 2004.

=== Leinster ===
In 2005, Cheika replaced Declan Kidney as head coach at Leinster. Mick Dawson, Leinster's chief executive, described it as a calculated punt. Kidney had left in contentious circumstances having agreed to a move to rivals Munster before the season's end and Leinster were said to be in disarray. Cheika brought Knox, his former teammate, with him to Ireland as an assistant coach.

Cheika's first season culminated in a Heineken Cup semi–final against Munster, which Munster won 30–6, on their way to lifting the trophy.

Cheika's second season in charge was a difficult one, as Leinster were knocked out of the Heineken Cup at the quarterfinal stage by London Wasps. In 07/08 Leinster won the Celtic League trophy with a bonus point 41–8 victory against the Newport Gwent Dragons. It was Cheika's first trophy as Leinster coach and Leinster's first since the 2001 Celtic League.

Leinster recruited Alan Gaffney to the management team as backs coach in the 2009 season, to join Kurt McQuilkin as defence coach and forwards coach Jono Gibbes. Leinster were unable to retain their Celtic League title, and finished third behind Munster and Edinburgh. Cheika led Leinster to European success, guiding the team to the 2009 Heineken Cup Final. They topped their pool by beating London Wasps, Edinburgh and Castres Olympique. Leinster was seeded sixth and faced Harlequins in the quarterfinal, winning 6–5. In an all Irish derby at Croke Park against defending champions Munster, Cheika guided the team to a 25–6 victory to set up a final against Leicester Tigers. At Murrayfield Stadium the team secured a 19–16 victory over the Tigers, to clinch Leinster's first ever European title.

In his final season in charge, Cheika led Leinster to top of the table in the revamped 2009–10 Celtic League, with 13 victories from 18 starts. In the semifinal, Leinster beat Munster 16–6, before losing to the Ospreys 17–12 at home at the RDS. The team was also unable to retain their European title. Leinster beat Clermont Auvergne 29–28, but lost to eventual champions Toulouse 26–16.

Cheika left his post with Leinster Rugby at the end of that season to become head coach for French Top 14 side Stade Français.

=== Stade Français ===
Cheika was Director of Rugby of the Paris-based club between 2010 and 2012. Off-field conflict and mediocre on-field results made his life difficult, culminating in him being sacked.

During the 2010–11 Top 14 season, Stade Français finished 11th in the standings with only 10 wins from 26. In the 2010–11 European Challenge Cup, Stade Français clinched top seed after the pool stage, winning all six of their matches, although their pool did include Leeds Carnegie, București Oaks and Crociati Parma, with the latter two being semi-professional sides. Stade won the quarterfinal beating Montpellier 32–28. Cheika's team beat Clermont, who had dropped down from the Heineken Cup, by 29–25 in the semifinal, but narrowly lost to Harlequins 19–18 in the final at Cardiff.

In the 2011–12 Top 14 season, Stade Français improved on their previous standing, finishing seventh with 11 wins. The team again clinched the top seeding in the European Challenge Cup and beat Exeter Chiefs 22–17 in the quarterfinal. They lost in the semifinal by 32–29 to Toulon.

=== New South Wales Waratahs ===
Cheika was appointed as head coach of the New South Wales Waratahs in 2012 for the 2013 Super Rugby season. In his first season, he guided the team to 9th place, with an even split of 8 wins and 8 losses. Their victories included a 25–20 win over the eventual (and defending) champions, the Chiefs, in round 10. The Waratahs turned over the Brumbies 28–22, before narrowly losing to the Crusaders 23–22 in Christchurch. Cheika also led the team against the British and Irish Lions, losing the match 47–17. He was responsible for signing Israel Folau from AFL side Greater Western Sydney Giants.

Cheika secured further key signings for the 2014 season including Kurtley Beale, Nick Phipps, Jacques Potgieter and another rugby league convert Taqele Naiyaravoro. He created attacking backline combinations with Phipps and Bernard Foley as the halves, Beale and Adam Ashley-Cooper in midfield and with Folau at fullback. The Waratahs dominant forward pack, led by Dave Dennis, created a platform for the skillful backs.

In his second season in charge, Cheika coached the Waratahs to their first ever Super Rugby title, with the team finishing seven points ahead of their nearest rivals, the Crusaders. The Waratahs defeated the Brumbies 26–8 in the semifinal which earned them a first home final against their Christchurch-based rivals, the Crusaders, whom the Waratahs had not defeated in over a decade. In the 2014 Super Rugby final the Waratahs beat the Crusaders by a single point, 33–32, in a nail-biter witnessed by a record Super Rugby crowd of over 61,007 people at ANZ Stadium in Sydney.

During the 2015 Super Rugby season, the Waratahs' campaign to retain their title started with a 25–13 loss to the Western Force in Sydney, which was later followed by a second loss to the Force in Round 13, losing 18–11 in Perth. Cheika led the Waratahs to a 29–24 win over the eventual New Zealand conference winners the Hurricanes in Wellington, and a 32–22 win over the Crusaders in Sydney. Across the 16 matches of the 2015 regular season the Waratahs conceded 11 yellow cards. Two players, Will Skelton and Tolu Latu, were suspended from playing during the latter stages of the tournament leading to Cheika's tactics being questioned. The Waratahs had lost to the Highlanders 26–19 in Dunedin in Round 5 and were defeated by them again in the semifinal in Sydney by 35–17.

=== Australia ===
==== 2014–2015 ====
Cheika was appointed as the head coach of the Australia national team on 22 October 2014, with a three-year contract that would see him take the Wallabies through the 2015 Rugby World Cup.

Cheika took over after Ewen McKenzie's shock resignation the previous week and had very little time with the team before Australia started their 2014 end of year tour. His first match as coach was a non-capped game against the Barbarians, with the Wallabies winning 40–36. Cheika's first test match as coach was a 33–28 victory for Australia over Wales which was a record tenth consecutive win against them.

Cheika lost his first match against France a week later, with Australia being defeated 29–26. This for France was seen as revenge following Australia's dominant 3–0 series win over Les Bleus in June 2014 under former coach Ewen McKenzie. Cheika's team lost their next match against Ireland 26–23. Ireland had led 17–0 after just fifteen but three quick tries in the next fifteen minutes put Australia back in the game.

Australia then faced Rugby World Cup rivals England who had only win from their last six starts. England's forwards overpowered Australia in the match to win 26–17. The result meant that Australia had lost three out of four test matches on their tour, their worst record since 2005. Cheika made it clear that the scrum needed to be fixed before the World Cup, and later sacked the forwards coach Andrew Blades.

Scrum coach Mario Ledesma was recruited to the Waratahs and began working on scrummaging with the Wallabies players that were in New South Wales. Brumbies head coach Stephen Larkham was brought in as backline and attack coach for the World Cup. Nathan Grey was appointed as defence coach.

In the lead up to the 2015 World Cup, Cheika is credited for inventing Giteau's law which enabled overseas based players to play for Australia.

During the 2015 Rugby Championship, Cheika made multiple changes to his side for each match despite the Wallabies' winning form. They opened their campaign with a 24–20 win over South Africa, winning in overtime with a late try from Tevita Kuridrani. They beat Argentina 34–9 a week later to set-up a decider with New Zealand in the final round. It was during that All Blacks match that Cheika started two specialized opensides for the first time since 2010, and they were both influential in the Wallabies 27–19 win. The win sealed the Rugby Championship for the Wallabies, their first ever Rugby Championship title, although including the former Trinations format it was the Wallabies' fourth title since the competition began in 1996. The Wallabies also achieved a 100% win rate for the first ever time in either format. The Wallabies failed to win the Bledisloe Cup, losing to New Zealand 41–13 in Auckland a week later.

Having only been in charge of the Wallabies for a year, Cheika led Australia to the 2015 Rugby World Cup final. They topped Pool A with victories over Fiji 28–13, Uruguay 65–3, England 33–13 and Wales 15–6. They narrowly beat Scotland in the quarter-final winning 35–34 after a controversial last minute penalty. They beat Argentina 29–15 in the semi-final to reach the final against the All Blacks. The Wallabies went down 16–3 at half time, but fought back in the second half to trail by only 21–17 with 10 minutes remaining. A drop goal, penalty and a last minute try saw New Zealand claim a 34–17 victory. On 1 November, Cheika was named 2015 World Rugby Coach of the Year, becoming the first Australian coach to win the award since Rod Macqueen in 2001, and the first non-New Zealander coach to win it since Ireland's Declan Kidney in 2009.

==== 2016–2017 ====
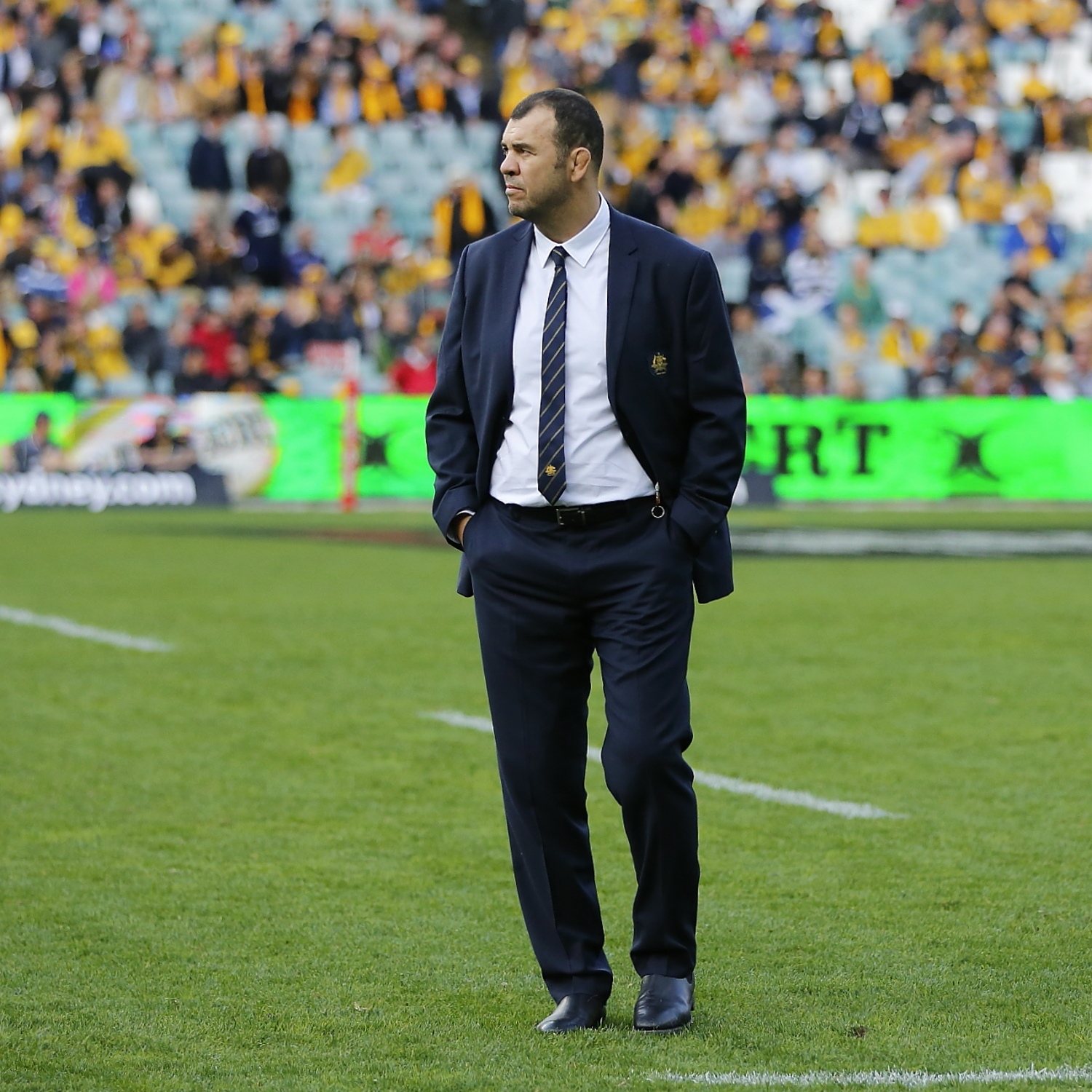
Cheika in 2017

In 2016, England toured Australia for a three-test series, the first of its kind. The series saw Australia lose all three tests to be "whitewashed" for the first time in a home series since South Africa won 3–0 in 1971. The first test, lost 39–28, saw England win back-to-back tests on Australian soil for the first time since 2003, while winning at Brisbane for the first ever time. The 39 points scored against Australia were the most points Australia had ever conceded by an English team. The second test saw England win 23–7, a record winning margin on Australian soil and a record third consecutive away win, to see England claim their first ever series win over Australia. The final test saw an accumulative score of 84 points, with England the victors 44–40.

He led Australia to second in the 2016 Rugby Championship despite losing the first two matches on an aggregate score of 71–17 against New Zealand. Cheika lead the Wallabies to their first win of the season against South Africa in round 3, winning 23–17, before defeating Argentina the following week 36–20. Australia narrowly missed out on their first ever victory at Loftus Versfeld Stadium, losing to South Africa in Pretoria 18–10. In the final week of the Championship, Argentina hosted Australia in London, where the teams became the first to play a Rugby Championship or Tri-Nations match outside any of the SANZAAR nations. Australia were the victors, 33–21. In the final Bledisloe Cup on 22 October, Australia were defeated 37–10, conceding 18 points in the closing 20 minutes. Australia's 2016 Spring tour saw mixed results, convincingly defeating Wales 32–8 in the opening week, before narrowly defeating Scotland with a 74th minute try by Tevita Kuridrani to win 23–22. Their third game saw Cheika completely change the team for the French clash, but still managed to claim the victory 25–23. The fourth and fifths matches on the tour saw the Wallabies lose their eight and ninth tests of the year, losing to Ireland 27–24 and England 37–21, with Ireland loss killing the Australian's chances of claiming a successful Grand Slam tour.

Australia's 2017 season started with a 37–14 victory over Fiji where Cheika gave four players their international debut. The following week, Australia lost to Scotland for the first ever time in Sydney, losing 24–19. It was the first time ever Australia had lost to Scotland twice in row at home, with the last loss, 9–6 in 2012, the last time Scotland had beaten Australia. Australia's final June test was a 40–27 victory over Italy, though for most of the game the teams weren't separated by many points with the score being 28–27 until the 75th minute. During the 2017 Rugby Championship, Cheika was heavily criticized for his constant changing off match day teams. It wasn't until the last round of the Championship that Cheika retained the previous starting XV in two consecutive matches, for the first time in his Career as Wallabies head coach. The Championship started with a 54–34 hammering to New Zealand, conceding 8 tries in 47 minutes. At the 50 minute mark, the score was 54–6, but Australia clawed back the margin scoring four tries in the last quarter of the game. In the return fixture, Australia came within minutes of claiming an away victory to New Zealand, leading the All Blacks 29–28 at the 77th minute mark. A Beauden Barrett try in the 78th minute saw New Zealand claim a 35–29 victory, despite at being behind 17–0 down early in the game. The third round saw Australia and South Africa draw for the first time since 2001, after the game ended 23–23. The result was repeated in the reverse fixture three weeks later, when it ended 27–27. Australia ended on a high, putting a solid performance against Argentina away, running out victors 37–20.

Ahead of the Wallabies' Spring tour, Cheika led Australia to a 23–18 victory over the All Blacks in the third Bledisloe Cup. It was the first time since 2015 that the Wallabies had defeated the world champions. This win was backed up by a narrow 31–28 non-test victory over the Barbarians and a week later a 63–30 win over Japan in Yokohama, both games featuring experimental sides for Australia. Australia's first major test on their Spring tour came on 11 November, where they faced and defeated Wales, 29–21. Despite the score being 13–6 heading into the final 10 minutes in the England test, Australia went on to lose their first tour match 30–6, conceding 3 tries. Australia's final test was a record defeat at the hands of Scotland, losing 53–24 in Edinburgh for the first time since 2009.

==== 2018–2019 ====
The Wallabies endured a shocking run in 2018; in June, Cheika led the team to a series defeat against Ireland, losing 2–1 having won the first test 18–9. A first loss to Ireland at home since 1979 in the second test (26–21) followed by a close encounter in the third test (16–20), meant Ireland claimed a first ever series win over Australia. Despite losing the series, the Wallabies out scored their opposition in terms of tries, scoring 6 tries to 3. It was also a first for Cheika in the second test, naming an unchanged matchday 23 for two consecutive tests, retaining the same team from the first test.

During the 2018 Rugby Championship, Cheika faced severe criticism over the team's form and a string of poor results. His job was openly questioned in the Australian media after the team won only two games during the Championship. Despite leading New Zealand 6–5 in the opening match, the Wallabies went onto lose the match 38–13, and despite being marginally behind the All Blacks in the second test, 7–14 at half time, they also went on to lose that match 40–12. Cheika's side did manage an impressive 23–18 victory over South Africa to retain the Mandela Challenge Plate. The following week, Australia lost to Argentina 23–19, which was the first time since 1983 that Argentina beat Australia on home soil. This meant the Wallabies dropped to a record low seventh place on the World Rugby Rankings and, after Round 5, their woes continued as they lost to South Africa 23–12. In the final round, Argentina led Australia 31–7 at half time in Salta but a record come-back in the second half meant Cheika and his team won 45–34, to secure third place in the Championship. In the third Bledisloe Cup match, held in Japan, the Wallabies put on a better performance but failed to capitalise on their chances, seeing the All Blacks win 37–20.

Cheika's team endured a similarly dismal run in the 2018 autumn internationals, losing 9–6 to Wales (their first win over Australia since 2008) before salvaging a consolation 26–7 victory against Italy. The Wallabies ended 2018 with a sixth consecutive defeat to England, going down 37–18. The team's win–loss record, having won only four out of thirteen test matches, was their worst since 1958. A review of the team's performance was conducted by the administration of Rugby Australia, with the board electing to back Cheika through to the 2019 World Cup. The decision was widely derided in the Australian sporting press, with speculation rife that the administration were unable to afford to terminate Cheika's contract.

2019 saw much change in the Australian set-up, beginning with the sacking of Stephen Larkham as attack coach and the introduction of a selection panel made up of Cheika, newly selected Director of Rugby Scott Johnson and Michael O'Connor who acts as an independent away from the national team coaching team. The new process started with a 35–17 loss to South Africa in the opening round of the 2019 Rugby Championship. The following week, Australia gained just their first win of the Championship, defeating Argentina 16–10. The final match against New Zealand that proved a success, after winning 47–26, a joint record defeat for the All Blacks. A win in the second Bledisloe Cup match meant Australia would reclaim the cup for the first time since 2002, but the Wallabies lost 36–0 to see the trophy remain in New Zealand.

At the 2019 Rugby World Cup Australia won three of their four pool matches but a close loss to Wales led to a quarter-final fixture with England. A defeat by 40–16 in that match ended the Australian campaign and the following day Cheika announced that he would resign as head coach by the end of the year. His contract had been due to expire following the World Cup.

=== Green Rockets ===
In May 2021, Cheika was appointed director of rugby of the Japanese rugby union team Green Rockets. Cheika left the Green Rockets in early 2023.

=== Argentina ===
==== 2022–2023 ====
In March 2022 it was confirmed that Cheika would coach the Argentina national rugby union team from 2022 through to the 2023 Rugby World Cup, with assistant coach Felipe Contepomi taking over post-World Cup.

Cheika's first matches as coach came against Scotland in a three-test home series. Starting half-back Tomás Cubelli was ruled out of the series due to injury acquired in training, while starting fly-half Nicolás Sánchez was replaced in game one after twenty-one minutes of play (calf tear). Argentina won the first game (26–18) in a tight back-and-forth match in San Salvador de Jujuy. Although the first test was a close win for Argentina, the second was a dominant blowout win for Scotland (6–29), scoring four tries to zero. Scotland also kept Argentina scoreless in the second-half, levelling the series 1–1. Scotland also levelled the overall record between the two sides (10–10). In the third and final test, the decider, Argentina clawed back a fifteen-point deficit to win the match in a spectacular last-minute final play in Santiago del Estero (34–31), winning the series 2–1. It was Cheika's fourth win in total against Scotland out of seven matches.

In their first two tests of the 2022 Rugby Championship, Argentina played Australia at home, following changes to the Rugby Championship round-robin format. In round one Argentina lost 26–41 at Estadio Malvinas Argentinas, Mendoza after leading 19–10 at half-time. In round two Argentina played Australia at Estadio San Juan del Bicentenario, San Juan. Similar to their first round encounter; Argentina started the match in a rapid fashion, scoring four tries in just a half-hour of play, and led Australia by sixteen points at half-time (26–10). After Wallaby flanker Fraser McReight was yellow carded in the sixty-third minute, Argentina prop Thomas Gallo went over for his second try of the match, extending their lead out to the biggest margin of the match up to that point: twenty-one points (31–10). A snappy reply from Australia's Len Ikitau saw them reduce the lead back to fourteen-points by the seventieth minute with only fourteen players on the field. In the final three minutes of the match, Argentina scored two unanswered tries finishing the match with their biggest victory of Australia (48–17; thirty-one points), beating their previous best victorious margin of fifteen points in 1983. After the match, Cheika stated: "I love these guys, they're my crew now[.]" adding, "I was up on the last try, cheering. But then I started crying because I know I probably shouldn't be doing this. It was a bit confusing for me, personally." [...] "But they're my boys now. That's my team. I will do everything I can to help them get success and enjoy rugby. They are paying me a lot of respect here and people are believing in the things that we are doing. I have to do everything I can to help them."

Following Argentina's first two rounds at home, rounds three and round four were played away against New Zealand, the first test at Rugby League Park, Christchurch, the second at Waikato Stadium, Hamilton. Argentina scored the first points of the game via a penalty goal through Emiliano Boffelli in the seventh minute. After ten minutes of play, and conceding a try, Boffelli scored another penalty goal for Argentina in the seventeenth minute. Following Argentina's second penalty goal, New Zealand scored a converted try and two penalty goals to lead 15–6, before Boffelli kicked another two penalty goals before half-time, reducing the deficit to three points (15–12). Argentina made the strong start to the second-half, capitalising on a re-start after a penalty goal Richie Mo'unga. Flanker Juan Martín González received the ball before he ran around into space on the short side of the field, going through for a try. Boffelli slotted the conversion, and, for the third time in the match, Argentina were leading. With vast bursts of physicality and many mistakes throughout the second-half, Boffelli added another six points to the score before full-time. The match finished New Zealand 18, Argentina 25. Historically, it was the first Argentina win against New Zealand, in New Zealand. It was the first time ever that New Zealand had lost three-straight home matches (the first two were against Ireland). It is also the second, back-to-back history-making match for Argentina with Michael Cheika as coach, mentioning, "It's a first for me, I've never won a Test match in New Zealand." When asked about the matches specialty regarding beating his home country (Australia) vs. beating New Zealand, Cheika replied: "I don't look at it like that. I look at it from our point of view and growing the team and, in particular, towards the World Cup." Following the historic result, Argentina jumped two placings in the World Rugby Rankings (9th to 7th) to sit just 0.01 points below Australia in sixth.

In the following round (four), Argentina suffered their heaviest defeat to New Zealand since 1997, losing 53–3. In very wet conditions, it took Argentina thirty-two minutes of play to finally score any points, coming through the boot of Emiliano Boffelli, by which point they had already conceded two tries and a penalty goal (score reading 17–3). Conceding over double the amount of turnovers as New Zealand, Argentina went on scoreless while the All Blacks scored an additional five tries by the end of the match. The loss to New Zealand put Argentina last on the Rugby Championship table, having been first for the previous two rounds (13 August – 3 September 2022). Despite the heavy defeat, Argentina went up one ranking (7th to 6th), due to Australia (whom was in sixth, one placing above Argentina) losing at home to South Africa by more than fifteen points in the same round.

In the same month (September 2022), former Australia scrum-half under Michael Cheika, Will Genia, said he could see the return of Cheika coaching Australia. Genia told Fox Sports Australia, "I can see it [Cheika returning as coach of Australia] and I would love to see it because I know he still harbours aspirations for it," adding: "He loves coaching".

=== Leicester Tigers ===
On 27 June 2024, Tigers appointed Cheika as their new head coach. On 2 October 2024, he was given two-week ban, with one week suspended, by the Rugby Football Union after being found guilty of "disrespecting" a match-day doctor during his first game in charge of Leicester. In January 2025, it was confirmed that he would be stepping down as head coach following the conclusion of his contract at the end of the season. In January 2025 Cheika confirmed he would be leaving Leicester at the end of the 2024-25 Premiership Rugby season. Under Cheika Tigers form improved and he led the side to the 2025 Premiership Rugby final, where they lost 23-21 to Bath.

=== 2027: Second Waratahs stint ===
Following the resignation of New South Wales Waratahs coach Dan McKellar in July 2026, Michael Cheika had been touted as a prospective candidate to take over the role. It was also reported that several players within the team had advocated for the administration to appoint Cheika as coach. On 22 August, after almost a month after expressions of interest for the role had closed, Cheika was confirmed as the new coach of the Waratahs ahead of the 2027 season, reuniting with former title-winning players Bernard Foley and Nick Phipps. In a press conference confirming the appointment, the Waratahs stated that Rugby Australia's Phil Waugh was vital in luring Cheika back to the team.

== Rugby league coaching ==
In 2020, following his departure from Australian rugby, Cheika took up a role with Sydney Roosters of the National Rugby League (NRL), as an assistant coach. In September 2020, the Argentine Rugby Union (UAR) announced that Cheika had joined the Pumas prior to the 2020 Tri Nations Series, taking up an advisory role and re-joining former Wallabies assistant coach, Mario Ledesma.

=== Lebanon ===
In November 2020, Cheika was appointed head coach of Lebanon, the country of his parents' birth, ahead of the 2021 Rugby League World Cup. He retained this position even when appointed as Argentina's rugby union coach.

The 2021 Rugby League World Cup was postponed to October and November 2022 and coincided with Argentina's tour of Great Britain. Although reported as notably difficult, coaching two national teams at the same time, Cheika maintained both positions. Cheika's almost entirely Lebanese Australian squad included his cousin Adam Doueihi.

In the group stage, Cheika's Lebanon played New Zealand, Ireland and Jamaica. Defeating the two latter teams, Lebanon finished second in the group, behind New Zealand and qualified for the Quarter-finals. Lebanon played Group B winners Australia, losing 48–4 in Huddersfield. Under Cheika Lebanon achieved their best performance at a Rugby League World Cup, finishing with a 2–2 record, and a points difference of fourteen.

On 4 April 2025 it was reported that he would resume his role as head coach of Lebanon in preparation for the 2026 World Cup.

=== Sydney Roosters ===
In September 2025, he joined the coaching staff of Sydney Roosters as an assistant coach, working with the forwards and in the club's pathway system.

== Statistics ==
As of 19 October 2019.

=== International record ===
Australia

Oponnent	Played	Won	Drawn	Lost	W%	For	Against
Argentina	9	8	0	1	89	294	172
England	9	1	0	8	11	186	289
Fiji	3	3	0	0	100	104	48
France	2	1	0	1	50	51	52
Georgia	1	1	0	0	100	27	8
Ireland	5	1	0	4	20	102	108
Italy	2	2	0	0	100	66	34
Japan	1	1	0	0	100	63	30
New Zealand	14	3	0	11	21	262	488
Samoa	1	1	0	0	100	34	15
Scotland	4	2	0	2	50	101	133
South Africa	8	3	2	3	38	159	181
United States	1	1	0	0	100	47	10
Uruguay	2	2	0	0	100	110	13
Wales	6	4	0	2	67	140	101
Total	68	34	2	32	50	1,746	1,677

Argentina

Oponnent	Played	Won	Drawn	Lost	W%	For	Against
Australia	3	2	0	1	67	108	89
Chile	1	1	0	0	100	59	5
England	3	1	0	2	33	63	82
Japan	1	1	0	0	100	39	27
New Zealand	4	1	0	3	25	46	156
Samoa	1	1	0	0	100	19	10
Scotland	4	2	0	2	50	95	130
South Africa	4	0	0	4	0	75	120
Spain	1	1	0	0	100	62	3
Wales	2	1	0	1	50	42	37
Total	24	11	0	13	46	608	659

== Honours ==
Australia

- World Rugby Coach of the Year
  - Winner: 2015
- Rugby World Cup / Webb Ellis Cup
  - Runner-up: 2015
- The Rugby Championship
  - Winner: 2015
  - Runner-up: 2016, 2017, 2019
- James Bevan Trophy
  - Winner: 2014, 2016, 2017
- Mandela Challenge Plate
  - Winner: 2015, 2016, 2017,
    2018
- Puma Trophy
  - Winner: 2015, 2016, 2017,
    2018, 2019
- Trophée des Bicentenaires
  - Winner: 2016
- Hopetoun Cup
  - Winner: 2016
- Killik Cup
  - Winner: 2014

New South Wales

- Super Rugby
  - Winner: 2014
  - Australian Conference winner: 2014, 2015

Stade Français

- European Challenge Cup
  - Runner-up: 2011

Leinster

- Heineken Cup
  - Winner: 2009
- Celtic League
  - Winner: 2008
  - Runner-up: 2006, 2010

Randwick

- Shute Shield
  - Winner (as coach): 2004
  - Winner (as player): 1987, 1988, 1989, 1991, 1992, 1994, 1996

== Personal life ==
Cheika is the son of Lebanese migrants. He is the youngest of three children and grew up in a working-class home in Coogee, New South Wales. He previously worked for dress designer Collette Dinnigan, before starting a multimillion-dollar fashion business of his own called Live Fashion. Cheika speaks fluent Arabic, French and Italian. He was known among the Leinster rugby fraternity as Mic Check 1–2, a humorous allusion to his name, Craig McLachlan's band and his eagerness that all facets of preparation were scrutinised and reviewed prior to matchday.

Cheika married in June 2008. He and his wife Stephanie have four children. He is a fan of the South Sydney Rabbitohs Rugby league team and is first cousin once removed of Adam Doueihi.

== Notes ==
Sporting positions
Preceded by Mario Ledesma	Head coach Argentina; 2022–2023	Succeeded by Felipe Contepomi
Preceded by Ewen McKenzie	Head coach Australia; 2014–2019	Succeeded by Dave Rennie
