= Folau Fainga'a =

Australia international rugby union player

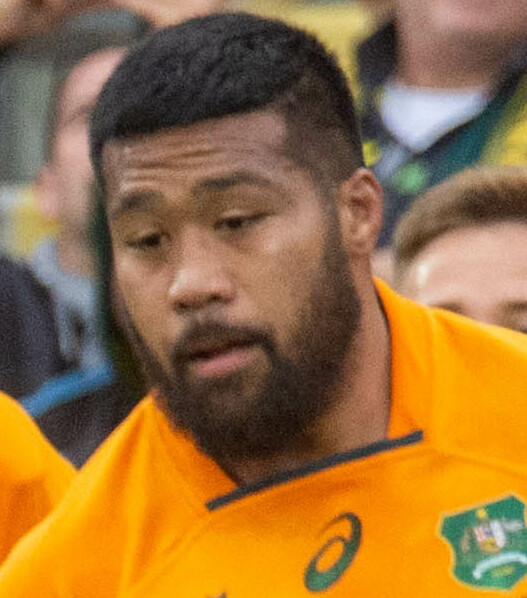
- Fainga'a on November 12, 2022
- Full name: Folau Fainga'a
- Born: 5 May 1995 (age 31) Sydney, Australia
- Height: 1.78 m (5 ft 10 in)
- Weight: 106 kg (16 st 10 lb; 234 lb)

Rugby union career
- Position: Hooker
- Current team: Waratahs
Amateur team(s)
Years	Team	Apps	(Points)
2015–2017	Sydney University	33	(60)
- Correct as of 19 July 2022
Senior career
Years	Team	Apps	(Points)
2016	NSW Country Eagles	5	(6)
2017	Canberra Vikings	6	(25)
2023–2025	Clermont	44	(50)
- Correct as of 10 May 2026
Super Rugby
Years	Team	Apps	(Points)
2018–2022	Brumbies	63	(170)
2023	Western Force	7	(20)
2026–	Waratahs	8	(10)
- Correct as of 10 May 2026
International career
Years	Team	Apps	(Points)
2015	Australia U20	3	(5)
2018–pres.	Australia	38	(35)
- Correct as of 22 August 2022

Folau Fainga'a (born 5 May 1995) is an Australian professional rugby union player who currently plays at hooker for the NSW Waratahs. He previously played for the Western Force, ACT Brumbies and the NSW Country Eagles. After his stint with the Western Force, he spent two and a half seasons playing for French club ASM Clermont Auvergne in the Top 14. Folau is currently signed on with Rugby Australia and was selected for the Australian national rugby team, the Wallabies, for the 2022 season.

== Career ==
Fainga'a began his senior rugby career with Sydney University. He played for that club in the Shute Shield for three seasons starting from 2015. Fainga'a was selected for the Australian Under-20 team in 2015 and played at the World Championship in Italy. He was also part of the Sydney Stars squad for the National Rugby Championship (NRC) that year but did not play any matches for the team. Fainga'a made his NRC debut off the bench for the NSW Country Eagles in 2016 against the Canberra Vikings.

Fainga'a signed an extended player squad contract with the Brumbies for the 2018 season, joining the Canberra Vikings late in the 2017 season. After impressing in his play for the Vikings, Fainga'a was invited by Australian national coach Michael Cheika to join the Wallabies squad as a development player ahead of the third Test for the Bledisloe Cup and Barbarians F.C. matches in October 2017.

=== International tries ===
As of 3 July 2022

Try	Opposing team	Location	Venue	Competition	Date	Result	Score
1	New Zealand	Perth, Australia	Optus Stadium	2021 Rugby Championship	5 September 2021	Loss	21-38
2	Argentina	Gold Coast, Australia	Cbus Super Stadium	2021 Rugby Championship	2 October 2021	Win	17-32
3	England	Perth, Australia	Optus Stadium	2022 England rugby union tour of Australia	2 July 2022	Win	30-28
4	England	Sydney, Australia	Sydney Cricket Ground	2022 England rugby union tour of Australia	16 July 2022	Loss	17–21
5	Argentina	Mendoza, Argentina	Estadio Malvinas Argentinas	2022 Rugby Championship	6 August 2022	Win	26–41

== Super Rugby statistics ==
As of 14 July 2018

Season	Team	Games	Start	Sub	Mins	T	C	PG	DG	Pts	YC	RC
2018	Brumbies	13	12	1	891	3	0	0	0	15	1	1
Total		12	12	1	891	3	0	0	0	15	1	1
