= Sandra Ioane =

- Born: February 12, 1962 (age 64)
- Height: 1.78 m (5 ft 10 in)

Rugby union career
- Position: Lock
Provincial / State sides
Years	Team	Apps	(Points)
- Auckland
International career
Years	Team	Apps	(Points)
1990 - 1992	New Zealand	4	(0)

Sandra Ioane (née Wihongi, b. 12 February 1962) is a former rugby union player. She made her debut for the Black Ferns at the RugbyFest 1990 against the Netherlands, she played in the first and third matches. She is one of two women who were unable to make the 1991 World Cup.

== Personal life ==
Ioane is married to former Samoan international Eddie Ioane. She is the mother of Akira and Rieko Ioane, both of whom have represented New Zealand internationally in the Māori All Blacks, Sevens and All Blacks.

She has a master's degree in Sports Marketing, and is currently the club manager at Ponsonby.
