= Rieko Ioane =

New Zealander rugby union player

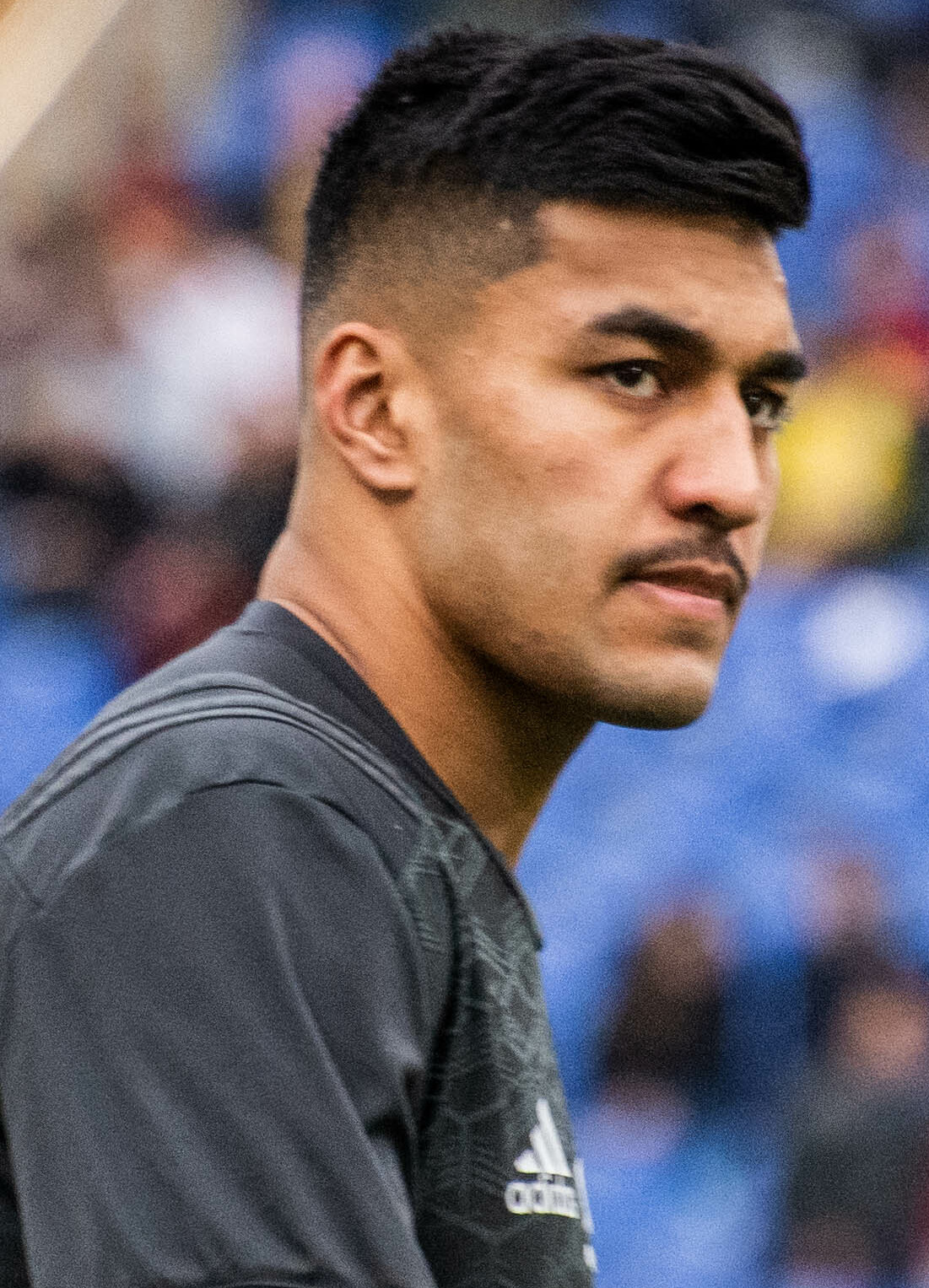
- Ioane in 2018
- Full name: Rieko Edward Ioane
- Born: 18 March 1997 (age 29) Auckland, New Zealand
- Height: 189 cm (6 ft 2 in)
- Weight: 103 kg (227 lb; 16 st 3 lb)
- School: Auckland Grammar School
- Notable relative(s): Akira Ioane (brother); Eddie Ioane (father); Sandra Ioane (mother)

Rugby union career
- Position(s): Wing, centre
- Current team: Auckland, Blues
Senior career
Years	Team	Apps	(Points)
2015–2016	Auckland	18	(70)
2016–2025	Blues	127	(275)
2025–2026	Leinster	18	(30)
- Correct as of 20 June 2026
International career
Years	Team	Apps	(Points)
2015–2017	Māori All Blacks	4	(5)
2016–	New Zealand	94	(200)
- Correct as of 21 November 2026
National sevens team
Years	Team		Comps
2015–2016	New Zealand		9
- Correct as of 5 November 2024
Medal record
Men's Rugby union
Representing New Zealand
Rugby World Cup
Bronze medal – third place	2019 Japan	Squad
Silver medal – second place	2023 France	Squad

Rieko Edward Ioane (/uɑːneɪ/; born 18 March 1997) is a New Zealand rugby union player who plays as a centre or wing. He played for United Rugby Championship club Leinster while on sabbatical. He is signed with the New Zealand team the Blues and plays for New Zealand at international level.

== Early life ==
Rieko Edward Ioane was born on 18 March 1997 in Auckland, the son of Sandra Wihongi and Eddie Ioane. He and his parents migrated to Japan during his early life after his father got a job playing professional rugby union in the country for Ricoh Black Rams. Growing up in New Zealand, he attended University of Auckland and Auckland Grammar School. While at secondary school, Ioane was chosen to play for Grammar first XV at the age of sixteen. He spent two years representing the side.

He is the younger brother of Māori All Blacks, Blues, Auckland and New Zealand Sevens team-mate Akira Ioane. Their parents were also rugby players, with father Eddie Ioane a former Samoan international lock who represented the country at the 1991 Rugby World Cup and mother Sandra Wihongi a former lock for the Black Ferns internationally.

At 17 years old, Ioane made his Sevens debut at the 2015 Wellington Sevens tournament and only a year later he was part of the New Zealand Sevens Team competing at the 2016 Summer Olympics. Ioane won the award for All Blacks Sevens Player of The Year later in the year, at the NZ Rugby Awards on 15 December 2016.

== Professional career ==
=== 2015–17 ===
Ioane was signed for Auckland in 2015 and the Blues in 2016, instantly becoming regular starters for both teams at outside centre. Ioane was just 17 years old when he made his debut for Auckland, becoming one of the youngest players to be selected at a Provincial level in New Zealand.

Ioane was called up to the senior New Zealand squad for the 2016 Rugby Championship as injury cover for Waisake Naholo after Naholo tore his hamstring against Australia. Ioane made his debut during the end of the year tour off the bench against Italy on 12 November 2016, replacing Israel Dagg in the 50th minute. He scored his first try for the All Blacks in the 73rd minute to help them to a 68–10 victory. Making his debut at the age of 19 years and 239 days, Rieko Ioane became the eighth youngest All Blacks Test debutant. Ioane was not named in the squad to play against Ireland the following week, but came off the bench in the next game against France to replace Ryan Crotty in the 44th minute, in front of 78500 people.

Ioane opened the 2017 Super Rugby season's first game with a hat-trick against the Melbourne Rebels. Ioane was one of the highest try-scorers of the 2017 Super Rugby season, leading the Blues with 10 tries. Following Sonny Bill Williams' long-awaited return to rugby from an injured achilles in 2017, Ioane was shifted to the left wing for the Blues halfway through the season to accommodate for Williams starting at inside centre and George Moala moving to outside centre.

Ioane was named to start on the left wing in the Blues' historic match against the British & Irish Lions and was one of the standout players in the fixture, crossing over the try-line three times in the fixture, but two of the potential tries were ruled out so Ioane contributed only five points to a 22–16 win. Ioane was named in the All Blacks squad for the 3-test Lions series the following day.

Ioane was the youngest player selected for New Zealand in the All Blacks squad to face the British & Irish Lions in 2017, the day after terrorising the Lions' defence in the Blues' 22–16 win. For the first test, Ioane was chosen over 53-test veteran Julian Savea to start as the left wing. Ioane scored two tries in the second half of the match, the first, finishing off a set-move as the All Blacks shifted the ball to the left from a scrum. The second, a sublime run from the Lions' 10m line after picking the ball following the ball being dropped by Liam Williams attempting to catch a high kick, helping New Zealand to win 30–15. Ioane started in the second test, where the All Blacks were defeated 24–21. Ioane was ruled out of the third after falling ill with influenza.

Ioane confirmed his spot as a regular starter throughout the 2017 Rugby Championship and displaced Savea in the entire squad, being awarded Man of the Match against Australia on 26 August and finished the tournament as the joint-highest try-scorer with Australian fullback Israel Folau. Ioane scored his fifth of the tournament in the 25–24 win over South Africa, intercepting the ball from 80 metres, outpacing the Springboks defence to score. He was only subbed off once in 2017, being replaced by debutant David Havili with nine minutes left in the second test against Argentina during the Rugby Championship.

Ioane clearly established himself as New Zealand's first-choice left winger on the 2017 end-of-year tour, having great games against France and Scotland, earning himself nominations for World Rugby Breakthrough Player of the Year and World Rugby Player of the Year, the latter of which he was up against teammate Beauden Barrett for. Ioane's 2017 season was thought to be over after a shoulder injury sustained at training, but he was named to start in the final test of 2017 against Wales. Ioane scored two tries in the test and also set one up for Anton Lienert-Brown, winning his second Man of the Match award for 2017 after the All Blacks won 33–18. Ioane won Breakthrough Player of the Year the following day, but lost World Player of the Year to Barrett. At the 2017 New Zealand rugby awards, Ioane was named the Tom French Memorial Māori player of the year.

=== 2018 ===
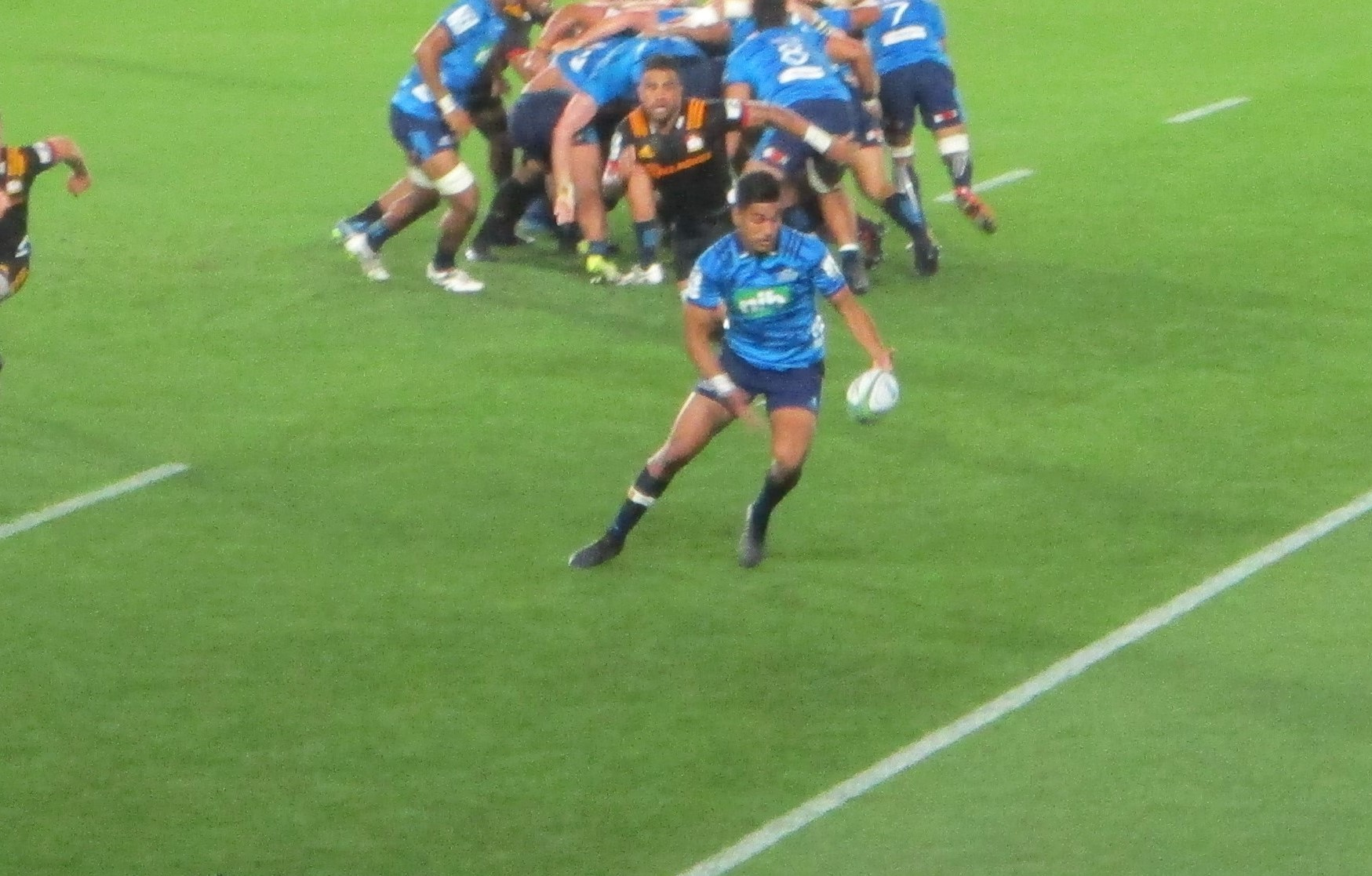
Ioane, gathering the ball, at Eden Park against the Chiefs, March 2018

As of week 16 of the 2018 Super Rugby season, Ioane has scored seven tries in the competition. With the exception of the Blues' defeat to the Rebels on 2 June 2018, Ioane has played the full 80 minutes of every game for the Blues during the 2018 Super Rugby season. Despite being used out of position at Inside Centre multiple times during the season, Ioane was still the Blues' highest try-scorer in 2018, scoring 10 tries. His outstanding form in Super Rugby saw him retain his place as a regular starter for the All Blacks during the 2018 Steinlager series against France.

On 9 June 2018, Ioane scored two tries against France during the second half of the All Blacks' 52–11 victory at Eden Park. His second try, in the 74th minute, was intercepted from the French reserve hooker Adrien Pélissié 80m out from the tryline. Although French winger Teddy Thomas almost caught up to Ioane, Ioane still managed to score. Ioane played the full 80 minutes of the second test, on 16 June and had an outstanding defensive performance, although he failed to make the same impact on attack, with reserve first-five-eighth Damian McKenzie finding it difficult to control the game and distribute the ball to Ioane.

On 23 June 2018, having already been phenomenal defensively during the first half, Ioane scored the first hat-trick of his international career, in the second half of the final test of the Steinlager series, as the All Blacks beat France 3–0 in the series, winning the final test 49–14 at the Forsyth Barr Stadium in Dunedin. Ioane was the first All Black to score a hat-trick in over two years, when former All Black Julian Savea scored the final hat-trick of his career against France when the All Blacks beat them 62-13 during the 2015 Rugby World Cup. Ioane scored his three tries against France in the space of only 12 minutes, with Damian McKenzie setting Ioane up for his first and third, while Vice-Captain Ben Smith set Ioane up for his second. Ioane managed to beat four French defenders when he scored his first try, despite the defenders being in front of Ioane. Ioane finished the Steinlager series having played the full 80 minutes of all three tests against France, as well as the highest try-scorer of the competition. Ioane lost out on the award for Man of the Match to outstanding lock Scott Barrett.

Although he missed two games in the competition, due to injury, Ioane was the leading try-scorer of the 2018 Rugby Championship, scoring 5 tries in the competition. Ioane shared the title with All Black team-mate, Beauden Barrett, as well as South African winger, Aphiwe Dyantyi. Scoring doubles against Argentina and South Africa, Ioane bought his international try tally to 21 tries, from only 20 tests.

Ioane played in four tests during the All Blacks' end-of-year tour in 2018, including the third Bledisloe Cup test against Australia, where he was named Man of The Match.

=== 2019 ===
Ioane was once again retained in the All Blacks' squad, for the 2019 Rugby Championship. Having featured in the All Blacks' 16–16 draw with South Africa, Ioane, as well as Ben Smith and Owen Franks, went on to perform poorly in a record 26–47 defeat to Australia, where Scott Barrett had already been red-carded. Ioane missed the second Bledisloe Cup test of 2019 injured, which saw him and Smith replaced by rookie wingers, Sevu Reece and George Bridge, with Beauden Barrett moved to fullback.

On 28 August, All Blacks Head Coach, Steve Hansen, named Ioane as one of 31 players in New Zealand's squad for the 2019 Rugby World Cup. However, due to the incredible form of Reece and Bridge, Ioane only featured once in the pool stages, scoring his only try of the competition in a 63–0 win over Canada. Ioane later went on to feature in the Bronze Final against Wales, with New Zealand having lost 7–19 to England. New Zealand claimed third place, beating Wales 40–17.

=== 2020–2024 ===
In 2020, Ioane represented the North Island in the 2020 North vs South rugby union match.

In 2021, Ioane helped the Blues win the Super Rugby Trans-Tasman competition. He also played 13 tests for the All Blacks and scored 5 tries.

In 2022, Ioane was a key part of the Blues squad that helped them reach the final of the 2022 Super Rugby Pacific. Although they would go on to lose to the Crusaders at Eden Park.

On 16 April 2023, New Zealand Rugby announced they had re-signed Rieko Ioane until the end of the 2027.

Ioane was a key member of the 2024 Blues squad that would go on to win the 2024 Super Rugby Pacific title where they defeated the Chiefs 41–10 at Eden Park to claim their first overall title in 21 years.

=== 2025 ===
On 16 April 2025, it was confirmed that Ioane would join Irish province Leinster in the URC competition where he will take a sabbatical from New Zealand Rugby for the 2025–26 season.

Ioane made his Leinster debut on 6 December 2025, coming off the bench against Harlequins in a Round 1 pool game of the Champions Cup. He made his first start a week later against Leicester Tigers.

=== 2026 ===
Ioane returned to play for New Zealand and Auckland based club the Blues for the 2027 season.

== Statistics ==
Club	Year	Competition	GP	GS	TRY	CON	PEN	DGL	PTS	WL%	Yellow card	Red card
Auckland	2015	Bunnings NPC (incl. Ranfurly Shield)	6	2	2	0	0	0	10	83.33	0	0
Auckland	2016	Bunnings NPC (incl. Ranfurly Shield)	9	9	10	0	0	0	50	44.44	0	0
Auckland	2019	Bunnings NPC (incl. Ranfurly Shield)	1	1	1	0	0	0	5	100.00	0	0
Auckland	2020	Bunnings NPC (incl. Ranfurly Shield)	2	2	1	0	0	0	5	50.00	0	0
Auckland	2025	Bunnings NPC (incl. Ranfurly Shield)	1	1	0	0	0	0	5	0	0	0
Blues	2016	Super Rugby Pacific	5	5	2	0	0	0	10	60.00	0	0
Blues	2017	Super Rugby Pacific	15	14	11	0	0	0	55	53.33	0	0
Blues	2018	Super Rugby Pacific	15	15	10	0	0	0	50	26.67	0	0
Blues	2019	Super Rugby Pacific	14	14	9	0	0	0	45	35.71	0	0
Blues	2020	Super Rugby Pacific	11	11	5	0	0	0	25	72.73	1	0
Blues	2021†	Super Rugby Pacific	14	14	3	0	0	0	15	71.43	0	0
Blues	2022	Super Rugby Pacific	12	12	5	0	0	0	25	83.33	0	0
Blues	2023	Super Rugby Pacific	14	13	4	0	0	0	20	64.3	0	0
Blues	2024	Super Rugby Pacific	12	12	0	0	0	0	0	83.33	0	0
Blues	2025	Super Rugby Pacific	16	16	6	0	0	0	30	43.75	1	0
Leinster Rugby	2025/26	URC/Champions Cup	18	16	6	0	0	0	30	77.78	0	0
Career			165	157	75	0	0	0	375	63.64	2	0

Updated: 19 June 2026 Source:

=== List of international test tries ===
Try	Date	Venue	Opponent	Result	Competition
1	12 November 2016	Stadio Olimpico, Rome, Italy	Italy	68-10	2016 end-of-year rugby union internationals
2–3	24 June 2017	Eden Park, Auckland, New Zealand	British & Irish Lions	30-15	British & Irish Lions Tour
4–5	19 August 2017	Stadium Australia, Sydney, Australia	Australia	54-34	Rugby Championship
6	26 August 2017	Forsyth Barr Stadium, Dunedin, New Zealand	Australia	35-29	Rugby Championship
7	16 September 2017	North Harbour Stadium, North Shore, New Zealand	South Africa	57-0	Rugby Championship
8	7 October 2017	Newlands Stadium, Cape Town, South Africa	South Africa	24–25	Rugby Championship
9	21 October 2017	Lang Park, Brisbane, Australia	Australia	23-18	2017 end-of-year rugby union internationals
10–11	25 November 2017	Millennium Stadium, Cardiff, Wales	Wales	33-18	2017 end-of-year rugby union internationals
12–13	9 June 2018	Eden Park, Auckland, New Zealand	France	52-11	2018 mid-year rugby union internationals
14–16	23 June 2018	Forsyth Barr Stadium, Dunedin, New Zealand	France	49-14	2018 mid-year rugby union internationals
17–18	15 September 2018	Wellington Regional Stadium, Wellington, New Zealand	South Africa	34-36	Rugby Championship
19–20	29 September 2018	José Amalfitani Stadium, Buenos Aires, Argentina	Argentina	17–35	Rugby Championship
21	6 October 2018	Loftus Versfeld Stadium, Pretoria, South Africa	South Africa	30–32	Rugby Championship
22	27 October 2018	Nissan Stadium, Yokohama, Japan	Australia	37–20	2018 end-of-year rugby union internationals
23	10 August 2019	Perth Stadium, Perth, Australia	Australia	47–26	Rugby Championship
24	2 October 2019	Oita Stadium, Oita, Japan	Canada	63–0	Rugby World Cup
25	31 October 2020	ANZ Stadium, Sydney, Australia	Australia	5–43	Tri Nations Series
26	6 November 2020	Suncorp Stadium, Brisbane, Australia	Australia	22–24	Tri Nations Series
27	3 July 2021	Mount Smart Stadium, Auckland, New Zealand	Tonga	102–0	2021 July rugby union tests
28	10 July 2021	Waikato Stadium, Hamilton, New Zealand	Fiji	60–13	2021 July rugby union tests
29	14 August 2021	Eden Park, Auckland, New Zealand	Australia	57–22	Rugby Championship
30	12 September 2021	Robina Stadium, Gold Coast, Australia	Argentina	39–0	Rugby Championship
31	20 November 2021	Stade de France, Saint-Denis	France	40–25	Autumn Nations Series
32	3 September 2022	Waikato Stadium, Hamilton, New Zealand	Argentina	53–3	Rugby Championship
33	19 November 2022	Twickenham Stadium, London, England	England	25–25	Autumn Nations Series
34	8 July 2023	Estadio Malvinas Argentinas, Mendoza, Argentina	Argentina	12–41	Rugby Championship
35	29 July 2023	Melbourne Cricket Ground, Melbourne, Australia	Australia	7–38	Rugby Championship
36	15 September 2023	Stadium de Toulouse, Toulouse, France	Namibia	71–3	Rugby World Cup
37	21 September 2024	Stadium Australia, Sydney, Australia	Australia	28–31	Rugby Championship
38	12 July 2025	Wellington Regional Stadium, Wellington, New Zealand	France	43–17	2025 France tour of New Zealand
39	22 November 2025	Principality Stadium, Cardiff, Wales	Wales	26–52	Autumn Nations Series
40	17 October 2026	Stadium Australia, Sydney, Australia	Australia	21–43	2026 Bledisloe Cup

Updated: 17 October 2026 Source: Rieko E Ioane Statsguru

== Honours ==
New Zealand

- Rugby World Cup
  - Third place: 2019
  - Runner-up: 2023
- The Rugby Championship
  - Winner: 2017, 2018, 2020, 2021, 2022, 2023
- Bledisloe Cup
  - Winner: 2017 - 2026

Blues

- Winner: 2024 Super Rugby Pacific

Leinster

- Winner: 2025-26 United Rugby Championship

Individual
- 2x World Rugby Player of the Year nominee: 2017, 2018

Awards
Preceded by Dane Coles	Tom French Memorial; Māori rugby union player of the year 2017	Succeeded by Codie Taylor
