= Eddie Ioane =

- Born: 2 June 1966 (age 60) Apia, Samoa
- Notable relative(s): Akira Ioane (son); Rieko Ioane (son)

Rugby union career
Senior career
Years	Team	Apps	(Points)
- Ricoh
Provincial / State sides
Years	Team	Apps	(Points)
1990–1991	Auckland		
International career
Years	Team	Apps	(Points)
1990–1991	Samoa	5	(0)

Eddie Ioane (born 2 June 1966) is a Samoan rugby union player. He played as lock.

== Career ==
Ioane's first match for Samoa was against Tonga, at Apia, on 17 June 1990. He was also part of the 1991 Rugby World Cup roster. He retired after the World Cup. In the NPC he played for Auckland.

== Personal life ==
He is married with the former Black Fern Sandra Wihongi and he is the father of Akira and Rieko Ioane, both of them playing for the All Blacks Sevens and for the All Blacks. Another family member is Steven Ioane, who plays for Ponsonby RFC.

In 2016, Ioane was named president of his former club Ponsonby RFC.
