= Juan Martín González =

Argentine rugby union player

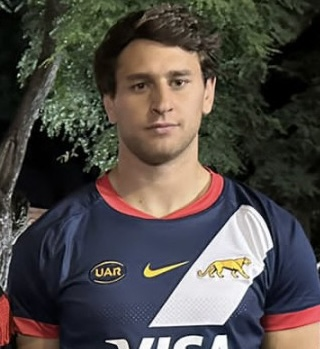
- González in 2023
- Full name: Juan Martín González Samso
- Born: 14 November 2000 (age 25) Mendoza, Argentina
- Height: 1.93 m (6 ft 4 in)
- Weight: 106 kg (234 lb; 16 st 10 lb)

Rugby union career
- Position: Flanker
- Current team: Saracens
Senior career
Years	Team	Apps	(Points)
2021	Jaguares XV	9	(35)
2021–2023	London Irish	37	(40)
2023–	Saracens	40	(85)
- Correct as of 22 May 2025
International career
Years	Team	Apps	(Points)
2019	Argentina U20	5	(5)
2021–	Argentina	47	(60)
- Correct as of 22 May 2025

Juan Martín González Samso (born 14 November 2000) is an Argentine professional rugby union player who plays as a flanker for Premiership Rugby club Saracens and the Argentina national team.

== Club career ==
González signed for Súper Liga Americana de Rugby side Jaguares XV ahead of the 2021 Súper Liga Americana de Rugby season. He signed for English Premiership Rugby side London Irish during the 2021–22 season. He signed for English Premiership Rugby side Saracens on 25 July 2023 for the 2023–24 season.

== International career ==
In June 2021, he was named in the Argentina squad for the 2021 July rugby union tests. He made his debut on 3 July, against Romania, scoring a try.

Having been a regular starter for Los Pumas since 2022, González became the first player born in the 21st century to reach 50 test caps for his country.

== Career statistics ==
=== List of international tries ===
As of 13 November 2022

Try	Opposing team	Location	Venue	Competition	Date	Result	Score
1	Romania	Bucharest, Romania	Stadionul Arcul de Triumf	2021 July rugby union tests	3 July 2021	Win	17 - 24
2	Italy	Treviso, Italy	Stadio Comunale di Monigo	2021 end-of-year rugby union internationals	13 November 2021	Win	16 - 37
3	Australia	Mendoza, Argentina	Estadio Malvinas Argentinas	2022 Rugby Championship	6 August 2022	Loss	26 – 41
4	Australia	San Juan, Argentina	Estadio San Juan del Bicentenario	2022 Rugby Championship	13 August 2022	Win	48 – 17
5	New Zealand	Christchurch, New Zealand	Orangetheory Stadium	2022 Rugby Championship	27 August 2022	Win	25 – 18
6	South Africa	Durban, South Africa	Kings Park Stadium	2022 Rugby Championship	24 September 2022	Loss	38 - 21
