= Len Ikitau =

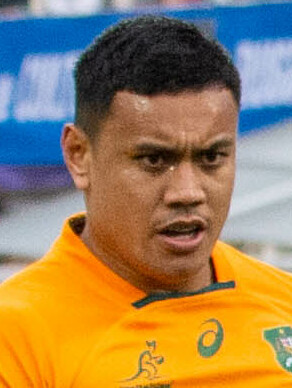
- Ikitau in 2022
- Born: 1 October 1998 (age 28) Brisbane, Queensland, Australia
- Height: 1.82 m (6 ft 0 in)
- Weight: 96 kg (212 lb; 15 st 2 lb)
- School: Brisbane Boys' College

Rugby union career
- Position: Centre
- Current team: Exeter Chiefs
Senior career
Years	Team	Apps	(Points)
2017–2019	Canberra Vikings	21	(30)
2019–2025	Brumbies	76	(130)
2025–2026	Exeter Chiefs	13	(20)
- Correct as of 22 June 2026
International career
Years	Team	Apps	(Points)
2021–	Australia	56	(55)
- Correct as of 10 October 2026

Len Ikitau (born 1 October 1998) is an Australian professional rugby union player. He plays as a centre for the Brumbies in Super Rugby and has represented Australia in international rugby. Ikitau signed for the Brumbies squad in 2019.

== Background ==
Ikitau was born in Brisbane, Australia and is of Samoan descent.

== Club career ==
Ikitau joined the ACT Brumbies pathways program after graduating from Brisbane Boys' College in 2016. He made his Super Rugby debut in 2019. In March 2023, he signed on a new deal with the Brumbies until the end of 2025.

On 24 April 2025, Ikitau has signed a two-year contract extension with Rugby Australia and with the Brumbies until the end of 2027. Ikitau's new contract means he will move to England on a short sabbatical to play for Exeter Chiefs in the Premiership Rugby competition for the 2025-26 season. In October 2025, he made his debut in a victory against Harlequins.

== International career ==
Ikitau made his debut for Australia in the second game of the 2021 France rugby union tour of Australia, coming off the bench in a 26-28 loss in Melbourne.

In July 2023, Ikitau suffered a fractured scapula in a game against Argentina. The injury meant that he was not considered for Australia's 2023 Rugby World Cup squad.

In 2025, Ikitau was awarded the John Eales Medal.
