= Akira Ioane =

New Zealand rugby union player

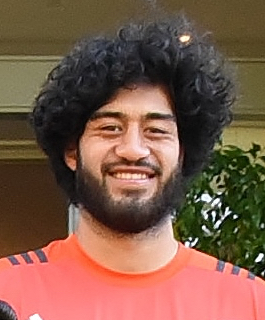
- Ioane at the Government House in Auckland, September 2017
- Full name: Akira Latrell Ioane
- Born: 16 June 1995 (age 31) Auckland, New Zealand
- Height: 194 cm (6 ft 4 in)
- Weight: 113 kg (249 lb; 17 st 11 lb)
- School: Auckland Grammar School
- Notable relative(s): Eddie Ioane (father); Sandra Wihongi (mother); Rieko Ioane (brother)

Rugby union career
- Position(s): Number 8, Flanker
- Current team: Kintetsu Liners
Senior career
Years	Team	Apps	(Points)
2015–2024	Blues	119	(145)
2015–2024	Auckland	63	(80)
2024–	Kintetsu Liners	21	(25)
- Correct as of 22 March 2025
International career
Years	Team	Apps	(Points)
2015	New Zealand U20	5	(25)
2015–2019	Māori All Blacks	13	(15)
2020	North Island	1	(0)
2020–2022	New Zealand	21	(5)
2023	All Blacks XV	2	(5)
2026–	Samoa	2	(0)
- Correct as of 6 December 2024
National sevens team
Years	Team		Comps
2014–2016	New Zealand		14
- Correct as of 16 July 2022
Medal record
Men's rugby sevens
Representing New Zealand
Commonwealth Games
Silver medal – second place	2014 Glasgow	Team competition

Akira Ioane (born 16 June 1995) is a New Zealand rugby union player, who currently plays as a flanker or number 8 for Hanazono Kintetsu Liners in the Japan Rugby League One competition. He previously played for Auckland in New Zealand's National Provincial Championship and the Blues in Super Rugby. Internationally, he has played for the All Blacks, the New Zealand sevens team, the Māori All Blacks and All Blacks XV.

== Early life and family ==
Born in Auckland on 16 June 1995, Ioane is the older brother of current All Blacks squad member Rieko Ioane. His father Eddie Ioane played for Samoa at the 1991 Rugby World Cup and his mother Sandra Wihongi is a former Black Fern. Of Māori and Samoan descent, Ioane affiliates to the Te Whānau-ā-Apanui and Ngāpuhi iwi. He was educated at Auckland Grammar School.

== Senior career ==
Ioane earned a Blues contract for the 2015 Super Rugby season after a stunning performance at the 2014 Wellington Sevens. He replaced Peter Saili in the squad, who left for a contract in France.

On 7 June 2017, with teammate Jerome Kaino unavailable due to injury, Ioane started in the Blues' historic 22–16 victory over the British and Irish Lions.

Ioane was a regular starter for the Blues from 2017 and played his 100th game for the franchise on 13 May 2023 against the Crusaders. He went on to play 119 games for the club, finishing his last season with the Blues as a Super Rugby Pacific champion. He scored the opening try for the Blues in their 41–10 victory over the Chiefs in the 2024 Super Rugby Pacific final.

Following that final, Japanese club Hanazono Kintetsu Liners announced that Ioane would join the team ahead of the 2024–2025 Japan Rugby League One season.

== International career ==
Ioane joined the New Zealand sevens team in 2014 and made his debut at the 2014 Wellington Sevens. He was a member of the New Zealand sevens squad that won the silver medal at the 2014 Commonwealth Games in Glasgow and finished fifth at the 2016 Summer Olympics in Rio de Janeiro.

On 11 July 2015, Ioane made his debut for the Māori All Blacks against Fiji in Suva. Almost two years later, on 17 June 2017, he started for the Māori All Blacks against the touring British and Irish Lions during a 10–32 loss at Rotorua International Stadium.

While on tour with the Māori All Blacks in 2017, Ioane was called up for the All Blacks as injury cover for Blues team-mate Jerome Kaino. Ioane made his international debut for New Zealand on 14 November 2017, replacing the in-form Highlanders flanker Liam Squire off the bench in the 53rd minute of a 28–23 victory over a French XV.

Following the shortened 2020 Super Rugby and Super Rugby Aotearoa season, as well as his showing in the 2020 North vs South match, Ioane was – for the first time – named in the All Blacks squad for the 2020 Rugby Championship.

After missing out on a spot in the All Blacks squad in 2023, Ioane was named in the All Blacks XV squad for their tour to Japan.
