= List of 2015–16 Super Rugby transfers (Australia) =

This is a list of player signings and releases involving Super Rugby teams in Australia prior to the end of the 2016 Super Rugby season. The release of a player that was included in a 2015 Super Rugby season squad, or the signing of a new player for the 2016 season is listed here regardless of when it occurred. Players that have been confirmed for the 2016 season are also listed, regardless of when they signed for the team.

Notes:

- 2015 players listed are all players that were named in the initial senior squad, or subsequently included in a 23-man match day squad at any game during the season.
- (did not play) denotes that a player did not play at all during one of the two seasons due to injury or non-selection. These players are included to indicate they were contracted to the team.
- (short-term) denotes that a player wasn't initially contracted, but came in during the season. This could either be a club rugby player coming in as injury cover, or a player whose contract had expired at another team (typically in the northern hemisphere).
- Flags are only shown for players moving to or from another country.
- Players may play in several positions, but are listed in only one.

== Brumbies ==
Brumbies transfers 2015–16
Pos	2015 squad	Out	In	2016 squad
PR	Allan Alaalatoa; Ben Alexander; Leslie Leuluaʻialiʻi-Makin (did not play); Scott Sio; JP Smith; Ruan Smith	(substituted off) JP Smith (to (South Africa) Stormers)		Allan Alaalatoa; Ben Alexander; Leslie Leuluaʻialiʻi-Makin; Scott Sio; Ruan Smith
HK	Joshua Mann-Rea; Stephen Moore; Siliva Siliva (did not play)	(substituted off) Siliva Siliva (to Rebels)	(substituted on) Robbie Abel (from University of Canberra Vikings); (substituted on) Albert Anae (from (Italy) Benetton Treviso)	Robbie Abel (extended playing squad); Albert Anae (did not play); Joshua Mann-Rea; Stephen Moore
LK	Rory Arnold; Sam Carter; Blake Enever; Scott Fardy; Tom Staniforth (did not play)			Rory Arnold; Sam Carter; Blake Enever; Scott Fardy; Tom Staniforth
FL	Fotu Auelua (did not play); Jarrad Butler; Sean Doyle; David Pocock; Jordan Smiler	(substituted off) Fotu Auelua (released); (substituted off) Sean Doyle (to (Ireland) Munster)	(substituted on) Michael Wells (from North Harbour Rays)	Jarrad Butler; David Pocock; Jordan Smiler; Michael Wells (extended playing squad)
N8	Ita Vaea		(substituted on) Ben Hyne (from Brisbane City)	Ben Hyne (short-term); Ita Vaea
SH	Michael Dowsett; Joe Powell (short-term); Nic White	(substituted off) Nic White (to (France) Montpellier)	(substituted on) Tomás Cubelli (from (Argentina) Belgrano)	Tomás Cubelli; Michael Dowsett; Joe Powell (extended playing squad)
FH	Matt To'omua		(substituted on) Jordan Jackson-Hope (from development squad); (substituted on) Nick Jooste (from Perth Spirit)	Jordan Jackson-Hope (development squad); Nick Jooste (did not play); Matt To'omua
CE	Nigel Ah Wong; Rodney Iona; Tevita Kuridrani; Christian Lealiifano	(substituted off) Rodney Iona (to University of Canberra Vikings)	(substituted on) Andrew Smith (from (France) Montpellier)	Nigel Ah Wong; Tevita Kuridrani; Christian Lealiifano; Andrew Smith
WG	James Dargaville; Henry Speight; Lausii Taliauli; Joe Tomane			James Dargaville; Henry Speight; Lausii Taliauli; Joe Tomane
FB	Robbie Coleman; Jesse Mogg	(substituted off) Jesse Mogg (to (France) Montpellier)	(substituted on) Aidan Toua (from Agen)	Robbie Coleman; Aidan Toua
Coach	Stephen Larkham			Stephen Larkham

== Force ==
Force transfers 2015–16
Pos	2015 squad	Out	In	2016 squad
PR	Pekahou Cowan; Tetera Faulkner; Chris Heiberg; Ollie Hoskins; Guy Millar (wider training group); Francois van Wyk (extended playing squad)		(substituted on) Jermaine Ainsley (from Perth Spirit)	Jermaine Ainsley (wider training squad); Pekahou Cowan; Tetera Faulkner; Chris Heiberg; Ollie Hoskins (did not play); Guy Millar (extended playing squad); Francois van Wyk
HK	Nathan Charles; Heath Tessmann		(substituted on) Anaru Rangi (from Perth Spirit); (substituted on) Harry Scoble (from Perth Spirit); (substituted on) Tom Sexton (from Rebels)	Nathan Charles; Anaru Rangi (short-term); Harry Scoble (wider training group); Tom Sexton (extended playing squad, did not play); Heath Tessmann
LK	Adam Coleman; Steve Mafi; Wilhelm Steenkamp; Rory Walton; Sam Wykes	(substituted off) Wilhelm Steenkamp (to (France) Brive); (substituted off) Sam Wykes (to (Japan) Coca-Cola Red Sparks)	(substituted on) Matt Philip (from Sydney Stars)	Adam Coleman; Steve Mafi; Matt Philip (short-term); Rory Walton
FL	Chris Alcock; Angus Cottrell; Ross Haylett-Petty (extended playing squad); Matt Hodgson; Kane Koteka (short-term); Brynard Stander		(substituted on) Richard Hardwick (from Perth Spirit)	Chris Alcock; Angus Cottrell; Richard Hardwick (wider training group); Ross Haylett-Petty; Matt Hodgson; Kane Koteka (extended playing squad); Brynard Stander
N8	Ben McCalman			Ben McCalman
SH	Ryan Louwrens (extended playing squad); Alby Mathewson; Ian Prior; Justin Turner (short-term)	(substituted off) Justin Turner (returned to Associates)		Ryan Louwrens; Alby Mathewson; Ian Prior
FH	Sias Ebersohn; Kyle Godwin; Zack Holmes	(substituted off) Sias Ebersohn (to (South Africa) Cheetahs); (substituted off) Zack Holmes (to (France) La Rochelle)	(substituted on) Peter Grant (from (France) La Rochelle); (substituted on) Jono Lance (from Waratahs)	Kyle Godwin; Peter Grant; Jono Lance
CE	Luke Burton; Patrick Dellit; Junior Rasolea	(substituted off) Patrick Dellit (released)	(substituted on) Ammon Matuauto (from Perth Spirit); (substituted on) Ben Tapuai (from Reds)	Luke Burton; Ammon Matuauto (extended playing squad); Junior Rasolea; Ben Tapuai
WG	Marcel Brache; Nick Cummins; Luke Morahan; Albert Nikoro (did not play); Mitchell Scott; Akihito Yamada (did not play)	(substituted off) Nick Cummins (to (Japan) Coca-Cola Red Sparks); (substituted off) Mitchell Scott (to (New Zealand) Tasman); (substituted off) Akihito Yamada (to (Japan) Sunwolves)	(substituted on) Brad Lacey (from Perth Spirit); (substituted on) Semisi Masirewa (from (New Zealand) Manawatu)	Marcel Brache; Brad Lacey (extended playing squad, did not play); Semisi Masirewa; Luke Morahan; Albert Nikoro
FB	Dane Haylett-Petty			Dane Haylett-Petty
Coach	Michael Foley		(substituted on) David Wessels (from assistant coach)	Michael Foley; David Wessels (caretaker)

== Rebels ==
Rebels transfers 2015–16
Pos	2015 squad	Out	In	2016 squad
PR	Cruze Ah-Nau; Paul Alo-Emile; Keita Inagaki; Tim Metcher (extended playing squad); Toby Smith; Laurie Weeks	(substituted off) Paul Alo-Emile (to (France) Stade Français); (substituted off) Keita Inagaki (to (Japan) Sunwolves)	(substituted on) Ryan Cocker (from (New Zealand) Taranaki); (substituted on) Jamie Hagan (from (England) London Irish); (substituted on) Tom Moloney (from Melbourne Rising)	Cruze Ah-Nau; Ryan Cocker (did not play); Jamie Hagan; Tim Metcher; Tom Moloney (development squad); Toby Smith; Laurie Weeks
HK	Patrick Leafa; Tom Sexton; Ben Whittaker	(substituted off) Tom Sexton (to Force extended playing squad); (substituted off) Ben Whittaker (released)	(substituted on) James Hanson (from Reds); (substituted on) Siliva Siliva (from Brumbies)	James Hanson; Patrick Leafa; Siliva Siliva
LK	Steve Cummins (extended playing squad); Sam Jeffries; Luke Jones; Cadeyrn Neville	(substituted off) Cadeyrn Neville (to Reds)	(substituted on) Culum Retallick (from (New Zealand) Blues)	Steve Cummins; Sam Jeffries; Luke Jones; Culum Retallick
FL	Colby Fainga'a; Scott Fuglistaller; Scott Higginbotham; Sean McMahon; Jordy Reid	(substituted off) Scott Higginbotham (to (Japan) NEC Green Rockets)	(substituted on) Harley Fox (from Reds Under-20); (substituted on) Rob Leota (from Northern Panthers); (substituted on) Adam Thomson (from Reds)	Colby Fainga'a; Harley Fox (extended playing squad, did not play); Scott Fuglistaller; Rob Leota (supplementary player); Sean McMahon; Jordy Reid; Adam Thomson
N8	Radike Samo; Lopeti Timani	(substituted off) Radike Samo (to Queensland Country)		Lopeti Timani
SH	Luke Burgess; Ben Meehan; Nic Stirzaker	(substituted off) Luke Burgess (to (Italy) Zebre)	(substituted on) Michael Snowden (from NSW Country Eagles)	Ben Meehan; Michael Snowden (extended playing squad); Nic Stirzaker
FH	Jack Debreczeni		(substituted on) Daniel Hawkins (from (New Zealand) Northland)	Jack Debreczeni; Daniel Hawkins (extended playing squad)
CE	Tamati Ellison; Mike Harris; Mitch Inman		(substituted on) Paul Asquith (from Greater Sydney Rams); (substituted on) Reece Hodge (from North Harbour Rays); (substituted on) Sione Tuipulotu (from Melbourne Rising)	Paul Asquith (extended playing squad); Tamati Ellison; Mike Harris; Reece Hodge; Mitch Inman; Sione Tuipulotu (supplementary player)
WG	Cam Crawford; Tom English; Tom Kingston (did not play); Sefa Naivalu; Dom Shipperley; Telusa Veainu	(substituted off) Tom Kingston (to Sydney Stars); (substituted off) Telusa Veainu (to (England) Leicester Tigers)	(substituted on) Kotaro Matsushima (from (Japan) Suntory Sungoliath)	Cam Crawford; Tom English; Kotaro Matsushima (short-term); Sefa Naivalu; Dom Shipperley
FB	Bryce Hegarty; Jonah Placid	(substituted off) Bryce Hegarty (to (Japan) Toyota Industries Shuttles)	(substituted on) Jack Maddocks (from NSW Under-20)	Jack Maddocks (short-term, did not play); Jonah Placid
Coach	Tony McGahan			Tony McGahan

== Reds ==
Reds transfers 2015–16
Pos	2015 squad	Out	In	2016 squad
PR	Ben Daley; Sef Fa'agase (elite development squad); Greg Holmes; Pettowa Paraka (elite development squad); James Slipper; Sam Talakai (elite development squad)		(substituted on) Taniela Tupou (from Queensland Country)	Ben Daley; Sef Fa'agase; Greg Holmes; Pettowa Paraka; James Slipper; Sam Talakai; Taniela Tupou
HK	Saia Fainga'a; James Hanson; Andrew Ready (extended playing squad)	(substituted off) James Hanson (to Rebels)	(substituted on) Matt Mafi (from Brisbane City)	Saia Fainga'a; Matt Mafi (short-term); Andrew Ready
LK	James Horwill; Marco Kotze (elite development squad); David McDuling; Tom Murday (short-term); Ed O'Donoghue; Rob Simmons	(substituted off) James Horwill (to (England) Harlequins); (substituted off) Marco Kotze (to Agen); (substituted off) David McDuling (to (South Africa) Sharks); (substituted off) Tom Murday (to Agen); (substituted off) Ed O'Donoghue (released)	(substituted on) Kane Douglas (from (Ireland) Leinster); (substituted on) Ben Matwijow (from (New Zealand) Canterbury); (substituted on) Cadeyrn Neville (from Rebels); (substituted on) Lukhan Tui (from Queensland Country)	Kane Douglas; Ben Matwijow; Cadeyrn Neville; Rob Simmons; Lukhan Tui
FL	Curtis Browning; Liam Gill; Michael Gunn (elite development squad); Adam Korczyk (elite development squad); Eddie Quirk (did not play); Beau Robinson; Adam Thomson	(substituted off) Eddie Quirk (to (Japan) Sunwolves); (substituted off) Beau Robinson (to (England) Harlequins); (substituted off) Adam Thomson (to Rebels)	(substituted on) Leroy Houston (from (England) Bath); (substituted on) Waita Setu (from Brisbane City); (substituted on) Caleb Timu (from Brisbane Broncos)	Curtis Browning; Liam Gill; Michael Gunn; Leroy Houston (short-term); Adam Korczyk (did not play); Waita Setu (short-term); Caleb Timu (short-term, did not play)
N8	Lolo Fakaosilea (extended playing squad); Jake Schatz; Hendrik Tui			Lolo Fakaosilea (did not play); Jake Schatz; Hendrik Tui
SH	Nick Frisby; Scott Gale (short-term); Will Genia	(substituted off) Will Genia (to (France) Stade Français)	(substituted on) James Tuttle (from Queensland Country)	Nick Frisby; Scott Gale; James Tuttle
FH	Quade Cooper; Sam Greene (short-term); Jake McIntyre (elite development squad); Duncan Paia'aua	(substituted off) Quade Cooper (to (France) Toulon)		Sam Greene; Jake McIntyre; Duncan Paia'aua
CE	Anthony Fainga'a; Sam Johnson (elite development squad); Samu Kerevi; Campbell Magnay; Ben Tapuai	(substituted off) Sam Johnson (to (Scotland) Glasgow Warriors); (substituted off) Ben Tapuai (to Force)	(substituted on) Henry Taefu (from Brisbane City)	Anthony Fainga'a; Samu Kerevi; Campbell Magnay; Henry Taefu
WG	Tom Banks (short-term); Chris Feauai-Sautia; Chris Kuridrani; James O'Connor; Lachlan Turner	(substituted off) James O'Connor (to (France) Toulon); (substituted off) Lachlan Turner (to (France) Toulon)	(substituted on) Alex Gibbon (from Brisbane City); (substituted on) Junior Laloifi (from Brisbane City); (substituted on) Eto Nabuli (from St. George Illawarra Dragons); (substituted on) Izaia Perese (from Queensland Country)	Tom Banks (short-term); Chris Feauai-Sautia; Alex Gibbon (short-term); Chris Kuridrani; Junior Laloifi; Eto Nabuli; Izaia Perese (did not play)
FB	Karmichael Hunt; JJ Taulagi		(substituted on) Ayumu Goromaru (from (Japan) Yamaha Júbilo); (substituted on) Jack Tuttle (from (Australia) Norths)	Ayumu Goromaru; Karmichael Hunt; JJ Taulagi (did not play); Jack Tuttle (short-term)
Coach	Richard Graham		(substituted on) Matt O'Connor (from attack coach); (substituted on) Nick Stiles (from forwards coach)	Richard Graham; Matt O'Connor (interim); Nick Stiles (interim)

== Waratahs ==
Waratahs transfers 2015–16
Pos	2015 squad	Out	In	2016 squad
PR	Michael Alaalatoa (did not play); Sekope Kepu; Benn Robinson; Paddy Ryan; Jeremy Tilse	(substituted off) Michael Alaalatoa (to (New Zealand) Crusaders); (substituted off) Sekope Kepu (to (France) Bordeaux)	(substituted on) Cameron Orr (from Greater Sydney Rams); (substituted on) Tom Robertson (from Sydney Stars); (substituted on) Matt Sandell (from Sydney Stars); (substituted on) Angus Ta'avao (from (New Zealand) Blues)	Cameron Orr (development squad, did not play); Tom Robertson (extended playing squad); Benn Robinson; Paddy Ryan; Matt Sandell (extended playing squad, did not play); Angus Ta'avao; Jeremy Tilse
HK	Tolu Latu; Tatafu Polota-Nau; David Porecki (short-term); Hugh Roach (extended playing squad)	(substituted off) David Porecki (to (England) Saracens)	(substituted on) James Hilterbrand (from Manly)	James Hilterbrand (short-term); Tolu Latu; Tatafu Polota-Nau; Hugh Roach
LK	Jed Holloway (did not play); Sam Lousi; Dean Mumm (short-term); Will Skelton		(substituted on) Ryan McCauley (from NSW Schools); (substituted on) Senio Toleafoa (from Sydney Stars)	Jed Holloway; Sam Lousi; Ryan McCauley (supplementary squad, did not play); Dean Mumm; Will Skelton; Senio Toleafoa (supplementary squad, did not play)
FL	Mitchell Chapman; Jack Dempsey (supplementary squad); Dave Dennis; Tala Gray; Michael Hooper; Pat McCutcheon; Jacques Potgieter	(substituted off) Mitchell Chapman (retired); (substituted off) Tala Gray (to (France) Toulouse); (substituted off) Pat McCutcheon (to Australia Sevens); (substituted off) Jacques Potgieter (to (South Africa) Sharks)	(substituted on) Ned Hanigan (from NSW Country Eagles); (substituted on) Brad Wilkin (from Reds elite development squad)	Jack Dempsey; Dave Dennis; Ned Hanigan; Michael Hooper; Brad Wilkin (did not play)
N8	Stephen Hoiles; Wycliff Palu	(substituted off) Stephen Hoiles (retired)		Wycliff Palu
SH	Auvasa Faleali'i (did not play); Brendan McKibbin; Nick Phipps	(substituted off) Auvasa Faleali'i (to (France) Nevers); (substituted off) Brendan McKibbin (to (England) London Irish)	(substituted on) Jake Gordon (from Sydney Stars); (substituted on) Matt Lucas (from Manly)	Jake Gordon (extended playing squad, did not play); Matt Lucas; Nick Phipps
FH	Bernard Foley; David Horwitz (did not play)		(substituted on) Andrew Deegan (from NSW Under-20); (substituted on) Bryce Hegarty (from (Japan) Toyota Industries Shuttles)	Andrew Deegan (supplementary squad, did not play); Bernard Foley; Bryce Hegarty; David Horwitz
CE	Kurtley Beale; Matthew Carraro; Rob Horne; Jono Lance	(substituted off) Jono Lance (to Force)	(substituted on) Jim Stewart (from Sydney Stars)	Kurtley Beale; Matthew Carraro; Rob Horne; Jim Stewart
WG	Adam Ashley-Cooper; Peter Betham; Taqele Naiyaravoro	(substituted off) Adam Ashley-Cooper (to (France) Bordeaux); (substituted off) Peter Betham (to (England) Leicester Tigers)	(substituted on) Henry Clunies-Ross (from Sydney Stars); (substituted on) Zac Guildford (from (New Zealand) Hawke's Bay); (substituted on) Andrew Kellaway (from NSW Country Eagles); (substituted on) Reece Robinson (from Parramatta Eels)	Henry Clunies-Ross (supplementary squad, did not play); Zac Guildford; Andrew Kellaway; Taqele Naiyaravoro (short-term); Reece Robinson
FB	Israel Folau; Ben Volavola (did not play)	(substituted off) Ben Volavola (to (New Zealand) Crusaders)	(substituted on) Harry Jones (from Sydney Stars)	Israel Folau; Harry Jones (supplementary squad, did not play)
Coach	Michael Cheika	(substituted off) Michael Cheika (to Australia)	(substituted on) Daryl Gibson (from assistant coach)	Daryl Gibson

== See also ==
- List of 2015–16 Premiership Rugby transfers
- List of 2015–16 Pro12 transfers
- List of 2015–16 Top 14 transfers
- List of 2015–16 RFU Championship transfers
- List of 2015 SuperLiga transfers
- SANZAAR
- Super Rugby franchise areas
