= 2014 National Rugby Championship =

- Date: 21 August – 1 November 2014
- Champions: Brisbane City (1st title)
- Runners-up: Perth Spirit
- Matches played: 39
- Attendance: 87,704 (average 2,249 per match)
- Highest attendance: 13,700; Brisbane City 37 – 16 University of Canberra Vikings (18 October 2014)
- Lowest attendance: 500; NSW Country Eagles 26 – 32 Brisbane City (24 October 2014)
- Top point scorer: Jack Debreczeni (144); Melbourne Rising
- Top try scorer: Andrew Kellaway (9); NSW Country Eagles

Official website
- buildcorpnrc.com.au

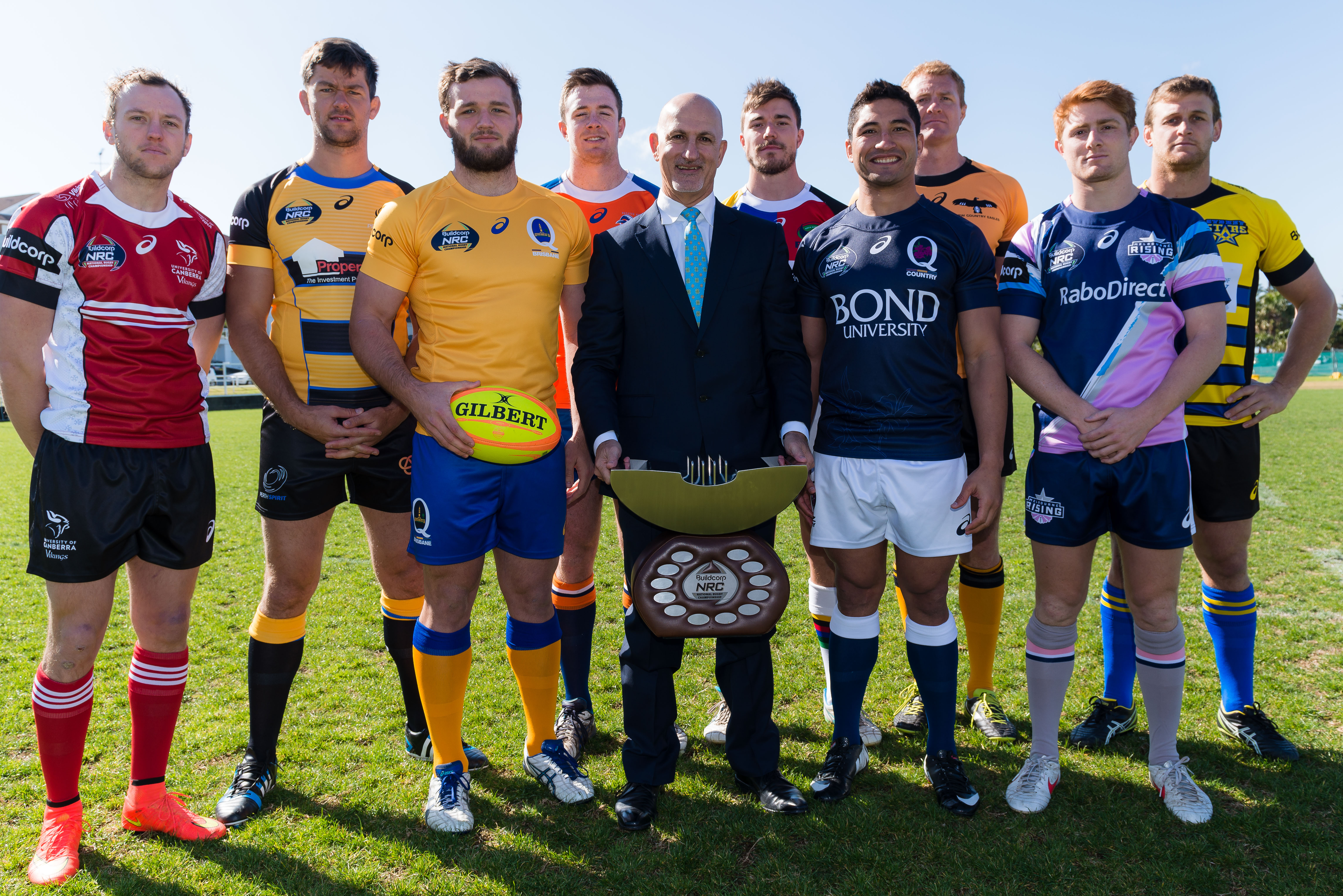
NRC Competition Launch with Buildcorp MD Tony Sukkar and players from all nine teams.

The 2014 National Rugby Championship (known as the Buildcorp National Rugby Championship for sponsorship reasons) was the inaugural season of Australia's National Rugby Championship, involving nine professional rugby union teams from around Australia. The competition kicked off on 21 August 2014. The final was held on 1 November 2014 and won by Brisbane City.

== Teams and venues ==
Location of teams in the 2014 National Rugby Championship

Legend:
BC – Brisbane City
MR – Melbourne Rising
NSW – NSW Country Eagles
PS – Perth Spirit
QC – Queensland Country
CV – University of Canberra Vikings

SYD – Sydney (see below)
Location of the Sydney-based teams in the 2014 National Rugby Championship

GSR – Greater Sydney Rams
NHR – North Harbour Rays
SYD – Sydney Stars

The nine teams for the 2014 NRC season included four from New South Wales, two from Queensland, and one each from Australian Capital Territory, Victoria, and Western Australia:

Region	Team	Coach(es)	Captain(s)
ACT	University of Canberra Vikings	(Australia) Dan McKellar	(Australia) Fotu Auelua
NSW	NSW Country Eagles	(Australia) Darren Coleman	(Australia) Matthew Carraro (Australia) Cameron Treloar
NSW	Greater Sydney Rams	(Australia) Brian Melrose	(Australia) Jed Holloway
NSW	North Harbour Rays	(Australia) Geoff Townsend	(Australia) Greg Peterson
NSW	Sydney Stars	(Australia) Chris Malone	(Australia) Pat McCutcheon
QLD	Brisbane City	(Australia) Nick Stiles	(Australia) David McDuling
QLD	Queensland Country	(Australia) Steve Meehan	(Australia) Anthony Fainga'a
VIC	Melbourne Rising	(Australia) Sean Hedger	(Australia) Nic Stirzaker
WA	Perth Spirit	(South Africa) David Wessels (South Africa) Kevin Foote	(Australia) Rory Walton (Australia) Sam Wykes (Australia) Ian Prior

Home match venues for the 2014 NRC season:

Region	Team	Match Venue	Capacity	City
ACT	University of Canberra Vikings	Viking Park	10,000	Canberra
NSW	NSW Country Eagles	Caltex Park	12,000	Dubbo
NSW	NSW Country Eagles	Central Coast Stadium	20,059	Gosford
NSW	NSW Country Eagles	Oakes Oval	10,000	Lismore
NSW	NSW Country Eagles	Wade Park	8,000	Orange
NSW	NSW Country Eagles	Coogee Oval	5,000	Sydney
NSW	Greater Sydney Rams	Parramatta Stadium	20,700	Sydney
NSW	North Harbour Rays	Brookvale Oval	23,000	Sydney
NSW	Sydney Stars	Leichhardt Oval	22,000	Sydney
QLD	Brisbane City	Suncorp Stadium	52,500	Brisbane
QLD	Brisbane City	Ballymore	18,000	Brisbane
QLD	Queensland Country	Ballymore	18,000	Brisbane
QLD	Queensland Country	Bond University	5,000	Gold Coast
QLD	Queensland Country	Cbus Super Stadium	27,000	Gold Coast
QLD	Queensland Country	Mike Carney Toyota Park	5,000	Townsville
VIC	Melbourne Rising	AAMI Park	29,500	Melbourne
WA	Perth Spirit	Adelaide Airport Oval	15,000	Adelaide
WA	Perth Spirit	HBF Arena	16,000	Perth
WA	Perth Spirit	Rockingham RUC	3,000	Perth
WA	Perth Spirit	UWA Rugby Club	4,000	Perth

== Experimental Law Variations ==
As part of the initial championship, the ARU was given approval by the IRB to conduct experimental law trials as part of the 2014 National Rugby Championship. Proposed law variations were first considered by a panel composed of the current Wallabies coach Ewen McKenzie, former Wallabies coach Bob Dwyer, former Wallaby Rod Kafer and former top referee Wayne Erikson. The variations were then put to the voting public, before returning to the panel.

The variations in place for the 2014 and 2015 seasons are listed below.

NRC Law Variations 2014–2015

Existing Law of the Game	Variation
Law 9.A.1; Value of a Conversion goal - 2 points Value of a Penalty goal - 3 points Value of a Dropped goal - 3 points	Value of a Conversion goal - 3 points Value of a Penalty goal - 2 points Value of a Dropped goal - 2 points Previously trialled in South Africa’s Varsity Cup.
Law 5.7(e); If time expires and the ball is not dead, or an awarded scrum or lineout has not been completed, the referee allows play to continue until the next time that the ball becomes dead. The ball becomes dead when the referee would have awarded a scrum, lineout, an option to the non-infringing team, drop out or after a conversion or successful penalty kick at goal. If a scrum has to be reset, the scrum has not been completed. If time expires and a mark, free kick or penalty kick is then awarded, the referee allows play to continue.	Non-offending team is allowed to kick the ball into touch after being awarded a penalty kick, which has been blown after time expires, and the lineout will take place.
Law 19.6; The player taking the throw-in must stand at the correct place. The player must not step into the field of play when the ball is thrown. The ball must be thrown straight, so that it travels at least 5 metres along the line of touch before it first touches the ground or touches or is touched by a player.	Latitude will be given to the throwing team if the opposing team does not compete for the ball near where the ball is received
Law 9.B.1(e); The kicker must take the kick within one minute and thirty seconds (ninety seconds) from the time a try has been awarded. The player must take the kick within one minute and thirty seconds even if the ball rolls over and has to be placed again.	Time limit reduced to 60 seconds for conversion kicks, and 45 seconds for penalty kicks.
Law 20.1(d); No delay. A team must not intentionally delay forming a scrum.	Team has 30 seconds to form a scrum from the time the referee gives the mark.
Law 20.12(c); When a team has won the ball in a scrum, the scrum half of the opposing team is offside if that scrum half steps in front of the ball with either foot while the ball is still in the scrum.	Opposing scrum half is not allowed to enter the gap between the flanker and number 8, even if they stay behind the ball
Law 21.2(a); The kicker must take the penalty or free kick at the mark or anywhere behind it on a line through the mark.	Increased latitude will be given to where penalty and free kicks are to be taken
Law 19.2(d); For a quick throw-in, the player must use the ball that went into touch. A quick throw-in is not permitted if another person has touched the ball apart from the player throwing it in and an opponent who carried it into touch. The same team throws into the lineout.	Players will be allowed to take quick throw-ins regardless of whether someone else has touched the ball
Law 17.2(d); Keeping players on their feet. Players in a maul must endeavour to stay on their feet. The ball carrier in a maul may go to ground providing the ball is available immediately and play continues.	Greater policing of this law, in order to discourage "hold up tackles", by ensuring that the tackler, who holds up a ball carrier in an effort to form a maul, does not collapse the maul as soon as it has formed.
Competition rule - Bonus point awarded for scoring 4 tries	Bonus point awarded if winning team scores 3 or more tries than their opponents. This particular system has been used in France's professional leagues since the 2007–08 northern hemisphere season.
Television match official protocols	Television match official to only be consulted about tries and in-goal plays.

== Regular season ==
The nine teams compete in a round-robin tournament for the regular season. Each team has four matches at home and four away, and one bye. The top four teams qualify for the title play-offs with semi-finals and finals.

=== Standings ===
Pos	Team	Pld	W	D	L	PF	PA	PD	TB	LB	Pts	Qualification
1	Melbourne Rising	8	8	0	0	399	184	+215	8	0	40	Qualification for Semi-finals
2	New South Wales Country Eagles	8	6	0	2	251	202	+49	2	1	27	Qualification for Semi-finals
3	Brisbane City	8	6	0	2	295	257	+38	2	0	26	Qualification for Semi-finals
4	Perth Spirit	8	3	0	5	301	259	+42	2	3	17	Qualification for Semi-finals
5	Greater Sydney Rams	8	3	1	4	254	265	−11	2	0	16	
6	Canberra Vikings	8	2	2	4	210	238	−28	0	2	14	
7	North Harbour Rays	8	2	2	4	240	327	−87	0	0	12	
8	Queensland Country	8	2	0	6	208	281	−73	1	2	11	
9	Sydney Stars	8	1	1	6	211	356	−145	0	1	7	

Updated to match(es) played on 18 October 2014. Source: rugbyarchive.net

=== Round-by-round ===
Team Progression – 2014 NRC season
Team	R1	R2	R3	R4	R5	R6	R7	R8	R9
Brisbane City	4 (3rd)	8 (3rd)	8 (4th)	12 (3rd)	12 (3rd)	16 (2nd)	16 (5th)	21 (3rd)	26 (3rd)
Greater Sydney Rams	0 (9th)	0 (8th)	4 (6th)	9 (6th)	9 (5th)	11 (6th)	16 (4th)	16 (5th)	16 (5th)
Melbourne Rising	5 (2nd)	10 (1st)	15 (1st)	20 (1st)	25 (1st)	30 (1st)	30 (1st)	35 (1st)	40 (1st)
NSW Country Eagles	5 (1st)	10 (2nd)	14 (2nd)	15 (2nd)	15 (2nd)	15 (3rd)	19 (2nd)	23 (2nd)	27 (2nd)
North Harbour Rays	0 (7th)	0 (6th)	0 (8th)	4 (7th)	8 (6th)	10 (7th)	12 (7th)	12 (7th)	12 (7th)
Perth Spirit	4 (4th)	5 (5th)	5 (5th)	5 (6th)	6 (8th)	11 (4th)	16 (3rd)	16 (4th)	17 (4th)
Queensland Country	0 (6th)	0 (7th)	1 (7th)	2 (8th)	6 (7th)	6 (8th)	6 (8th)	11 (8th)	11 (8th)
Sydney Stars	0 (8th)	0 (9th)	0 (9th)	0 (9th)	2 (9th)	2 (9th)	3 (9th)	3 (9th)	7 (9th)
University of Canberra Vikings	1 (5th)	5 (4th)	9 (3rd)	9 (4th)	11 (4th)	11 (5th)	13 (6th)	14 (6th)	14 (6th)
The table above shows a team's progression throughout the season. For each round, their cumulative points total is shown with the overall log position in brackets.
Key:	win	draw	loss	bye					

Points by Round
Team	1		2		3		4		5		6		7		8		9		Total		Average	
Brisbane City	45	20	26	21	18	79	34	26	N/A	N/A	29	13	29	56	77	26	37	16	295	257	37	32
Greater Sydney Rams	2	31	18	37	44	34	47	18	13	24	34	34	56	29	40	58	N/A	N/A	254	265	32	33
Melbourne Rising	55	34	45	13	79	18	44	24	37	16	34	13	N/A	N/A	58	40	47	26	399	184	50	23
NSW Country Eagles	31	2	37	13	33	21	26	34	16	37	N/A	N/A	26	24	42	37	40	34	251	202	31	25
North Harbour Rays	34	55	N/A	N/A	21	33	32	29	32	29	34	34	21	21	26	77	40	49	240	327	31	41
Perth Spirit	28	23	21	26	34	44	24	44	29	32	63	21	68	29	N/A	N/A	34	40	301	259	38	32
Queensland Country	N/A	N/A	13	37	21	26	29	32	24	13	13	29	29	68	53	29	26	47	208	281	26	35
Sydney Stars	20	45	13	45	N/A	N/A	18	47	37	37	21	63	24	26	29	53	49	40	211	356	26	45
University of Canberra Vikings	23	28	37	18	26	21	N/A	N/A	37	37	13	34	21	21	37	42	16	37	210	238	26	30
Key:	Offensive		Defensive																			

Tries by Round
Team	1		2		3		4		5		6		7		8		9		Total		Average	
Brisbane City	6	4	4	3	3	11	5	4	N/A	N/A	4	2	4	7	10	4	5	2	41	37	5.1	4.6
Greater Sydney Rams	0	4	3	5	6	5	7	3	2	3	4	4	7	4	5	8	N/A	N/A	34	36	4.3	4.5
Melbourne Rising	8	5	6	2	11	3	7	3	5	2	5	2	N/A	N/A	8	5	7	4	57	26	7.1	3.3
NSW Country Eagles	4	0	5	2	4	3	4	5	2	5	N/A	N/A	4	3	6	5	5	5	34	28	4.3	3.5
North Harbour Rays	5	8	N/A	N/A	3	4	4	4	4	4	4	4	3	3	4	10	5	7	32	44	4.0	5.4
Perth Spirit	4	4	3	4	5	6	3	7	4	4	9	3	10	4	N/A	N/A	5	5	43	37	5.4	4.6
Queensland Country	N/A	N/A	2	5	3	4	4	4	3	2	2	4	4	10	7	4	4	7	29	40	3.6	5.0
Sydney Stars	4	6	2	6	N/A	N/A	3	7	5	5	3	9	3	4	4	7	7	5	31	49	3.9	6.1
University of Canberra Vikings	4	4	5	3	4	3	N/A	N/A	5	5	2	5	3	3	5	6	2	5	30	34	3.8	4.3
Key:	Offensive		Defensive																			

=== Competition rounds ===
==== Round 1 ====
21 August	Brisbane City	45–20	Sydney Stars	Ballymore, Brisbane
19:30 AEST	Try: Toby White 6', 43'; Chris Kuridrani 37', 62'; Jake McIntyre 45'; Harry Parker 64'; Con: Jake McIntyre 7', 38', 46', 63', 65' (5/6)	Report; Summary	Try: Henry Clunies-Ross 2'; Sam Quinn 20'; James Dargaville 25'; Jim Stewart 31'; Con: Stuart Dunbar (0/4)	Attendance: 3,408; Referee: (Australia) Rohan Hoffmann

23 August	(BP) Canberra Vikings	23–28	Perth Spirit	Viking Park, Canberra
14:30 AEST	Try: Isaac Thompson 41'; Robbie Coleman 54', 63'; Nigel Ah Wong 59'; Con: Christian Lealiifano 63' (1/4); Cards: Tom Staniforth (yellow card) 65' to 75'	Report; Summary	Try: Zack Holmes 7'; Dillyn Leyds 28'; Amman Matuatu 69'; Heath Tessmann 80'; Con: Zack Holmes 8' (1/2); Luke Burton 70' (1/2); Pen: Luke Burton 76' (1/1); Cards: Richard Hardwick (yellow card) 55' to 65'; Alec Hepburn (yellow card) 56' to 66'	Attendance: 1,500; Referee: (Australia) Damien Mitchelmore

23 August	(BP) NSW Country Eagles	31–2	Greater Sydney Rams	Coogee Oval, Sydney
15:00 AEST	Try: Matthew Carraro 41'; Andrew Kellaway 66'; Will Miller 69'; Apakuku Ma'afu 80'; Con: Sam Windsor 41', 66', 80' (3/4); Pen: Sam Windsor 20' (1/1)	Report; Summary	Pen: Ben Volavola 9' (1/1); Cards: Benn Robinson (yellow card) 66' to 76'; Auvasa Faleali'i (yellow card) 66' to 76'	Attendance: 1,000; Referee: (Australia) James Leckie

24 August	(BP) Melbourne Rising	55–34	North Harbour Rays	AAMI Park, Melbourne
14:00 AEST	Try: Telusa Veainu 5', 42'; Sefa Naivalu 14', 67'; Nic Stirzaker 24'; Jack Debreczeni 43', 78'; Reuben Rolleston 68'; Con: Jack Debreczeni 5', 24', 42', 43', 68' (5/8)	Report; Summary	Try: Ed Gower 15'; David Fletscheer 25'; Matt Lucas 31'; Mitch Lewis 40'; Dave Porecki 41'; Con: Hamish Angus 15', 31', 41' (3/5)	Attendance: 2,187; Referee: (Australia) Andrew Lees

Bye/s: Queensland Country

==== Round 2 ====
28 August	Greater Sydney Rams	18–37	Canberra Vikings	Pirtek Stadium, Sydney
19:30 AEST	Try: Auvasa Faleali'i 5'; Afa Pakalani 18'; Jed Holloway 62'; Con: Ben Volavola 65' (1/3); Cards: Hugh Roach (yellow card) 67' to 77'; Jed Gillespie (yellow card) 78'	Report; Summary	Try: Isaac Thompson 25'; Leslie Leulua’iali’i-Makin 39'; Jarrad Butler 49', 68'; Thomas Cusack 51'; Con: Jesse Mogg 26', 40', 52', 69' (4/5); Cards: Seilala Lam (yellow card) 10' to 20'	Attendance: 1,500; Referee: (Australia) Angus Gardner

30 August	Queensland Country	13–37	NSW Country Eagles (BP)	Bond University, Gold Coast
15:00 AEST	Try: Tom Pincus 23'; Rubin Fuimaono 51'; Con: Tom Pincus 520' (1/2); Pen: Tom Pincus (0/1)	Report; Summary	Try: Stephen Hoiles 5'; Andrew Kellaway 16', 26', 79'; Patrick Dellit 75'; Con: Sam Windsor 6', 17', 76' (3/4); Darcy Etrich 80' (1/1)	Attendance: 2,000; Referee: (Australia) Steve Walsh

31 August	Sydney Stars	13-45	Melbourne Rising (BP)	Leichhardt Oval, Sydney
15:00 AEST	Try: James Dargaville 25'; Jim Stewart 29'; Con: Stuart Dunbar 30' (1/2)	Report; Summary	Try: Nic Stirzaker 11'; Mitch Inman 22'; Telusa Veainu 39'; Sam Jeffries 46'; Sefa Naivalu 53'; Joe Kamana 72'; Con: Jack Debreczeni 22', 39', 47', 54', 73' (5/6)	Attendance: 1,005; Referee: (New Zealand) Shane McDermott

31 August	(BP) Perth Spirit	21–26	Brisbane City	McGillivray Oval, Perth
15:30 AWST	Try: Dillyn Leyds 13', 35'; Heath Tessmann 21'; Con: Dillyn Leyds 14', 36' (2/3); Cards: Matt Hodgson (yellow card) 43' to 53'	Report; Summary	Try: Chris Kuridrani 4'; Pettowa Paraka 30', 38'; Junior Laloifi 66'; Con: Jake McIntyre 39', 67' (2/4); Pen: Jake McIntyre (0/1)	Attendance: 2,300; Referee: (Australia) Graham Cooper

Bye/s: North Harbour Rays

==== Round 3 ====
4 September	North Harbour Rays	21–33	NSW Country Eagles	Brookvale Oval, Sydney
19:30 AEST	Try: Michael Wells 6'; Luke Holmes 40'; Dave Feltscheer 51'; Con: Hamish Angus 40', 52' (2/3)	Report; Summary	Try: Andrew Kellaway 12', 60'; Ed Stubbs 30'; Samu Wara 57'; Con: Sam Windsor 13', 31', 58' (3/4); Pen: Sam Windsor 67', 80' (2/2)	Attendance: 1,982; Referee: (Australia) Graham Cooper

6 September	Perth Spirit	34–44	Greater Sydney Rams	Adelaide Airport Stadium, Adelaide
14:00 ACST	Try: Alec Hepburn 29'; Zack Holmes 35'; Dillyn Leyds 40'; Harry Scoble 48'; Va'a Mailei 74'; Con: Ian Prior 29', 36', 75' (3/5); Cards: Kieran Stringer (yellow card) 22' to 32'	Report; Summary	Try: Taqele Naiyaravoro 22', 44', 62'; Jed Holloway 56'; Jarome McKenzie 64'; Dane Chisholm 69'; Con: Ben Volavola 23', 57', 63', 65' (4/6); Pen: Ben Volavola 17' (1/1); Dane Chisholm (0/1)	Attendance: 2,000; Referee: (Australia) Andrew Lees

6 September	Canberra Vikings	26–21	Queensland Country (BP)	Viking Park, Canberra
14:30 AEST	Try: Jarrad Butler 7'; Jerome Nuimata 34'; Nigel Ah Wong 53'; Robbie Coleman 79'; Con: Jesse Mogg 8', 54' (2/4)	Report; Summary	Try: Clynton Knox 12'; Beau Robinson 17'; James Turner 80'; Con: Matt Brandon 13', 80' (2/3)	Attendance: 2,000; Referee: (New Zealand) Shane McDermott

6 September	Brisbane City	18–79	Melbourne Rising (BP)	Ballymore, Brisbane
15:00 AEST	Try: Chris Kuridrani 12'; Samu Kerevi 19'; Liam Gill 26'; Con: Jake McIntyre 13' (1/3); Cards: Nick Frisby (yellow card) 5' to 15'; Will Genia (yellow card) 48' to 58'	Report; Summary	Try: Jonah Placid 4'; Sefa Naivalu 7'; Tom English 24', 58', 63', 80'; Lopeti Timani 31', 52'; Telusa Veainu 43'; Pat Leafa 68'; Lloyd Johansson 76'; Con: Jack Debreczeni 8', 25', 32', 52', 59', 64', 70', 77' (6/8); Lloyd Johansson 70', 77' (2/3)	Attendance: 2,500; Referee: (Australia) Steve Walsh

Bye/s: Sydney Stars

==== Round 4 ====
11 September	(BP)Melbourne Rising	44–24	Perth Spirit	AAMI Park, Melbourne
19:30 AEST	Try: Lopeti Timani 25', 65'; Telusa Veainu 28', 65'; Joe Kamana 31'; Cadeyrn Neville 60'; Luke Burgess 75'; Con: Jack Debreczeni 25', 66' (2/4); Telusa Veainu 57' (1/2); Lloyd Johansson (0/1); Cards: Pom Simona (yellow card) 68' to 78'	Report; Summary	Try: Alex Rovira 14'; Brad Lacey 48'; Zack Holmes 80'; Con: Luke Burton 14', 50' (2/2); Zack Holmes 80' (1/1); Cards: Brent Murphy (yellow card) 51' to 61'	Attendance: 2,096; Referee: (Australia) Will Houston

13 September	(BP)Greater Sydney Rams	47–18	Sydney Stars	Pirtek Stadium, Sydney
15:00 AEST	Try: Taqele Naiyaravoro 5'; Jared Barry 19'; Chris Alcock 23' penalty try 39'; Hugh Roach 43'; Jarome McKenzie 57'; Michael McDougall 63'; Con: Ben Volavola 20', 24', 40', 44' (4/6); Dane Chisholm (0/1)	Report; Summary	Try: Jack Macklin 28'; Will Skelton 48'; Jake Gordon 61'; Con: Stuart Dunbar (0/1); Jack Macklin 62' (1/2)	Attendance: 1,063; Referee: (Australia) Ian Smith

13 September	(BP)Queensland Country	29–32	North Harbour Rays	Cbus Super Stadium, Gold Coast
17:10 AEST	Try: Todd Winkley 18', 58' penalty try 53'; Jack de Guingand 62'; Con: Matt Brandon 19', 54', 59' (3/4); Cards: Anthony Fainga'a (yellow card) 23' to 33'	Report; Summary	Try: Luke Holmes 7'; Hamish Angus 29'; Dave Feltscheer 33'; Ed Gower 74'; Con: Hamish Angus 8', 30', 34', 75' (4/4); Cards: Ed Gower (yellow card) 52' to 62'	Attendance: 1,500 (Note: The Round 4 match of Queensland Country vs North Harbour was the curtain raiser for the Australia vs Argentina Test.); Referee: (Australia) Matt O'Brien

14 September	(BP)NSW Country Eagles	26–34	Brisbane City	Oakes Oval, Lismore
15:00 AEST	Try: Tala Gray 9', 40'; Brendan McKibbin 54'; Mick Snowden 79'; Con: Sam Windsor 55' (1/3); Darcy Etrich 80' (1/1); Cards: Stephen Hoiles (yellow card) 21' to 31'	Report; Summary	Try: Samu Kerevi 6'; Jake Schatz 14', 22', 48'; Lachlan Turner 26'; Con: Jake McIntyre 6', 15', 26' (3/5); Cards: Liam Gill (yellow card) 54' to 64'	Attendance: 750; Referee: (Australia) Damien Mitchelmore

Bye/s: Canberra Vikings

==== Round 5 ====
18 September	Queensland Country	24–13	Greater Sydney Rams	Ballymore, Brisbane
19:30 AEST	Try: Sam Grasso 4' penalty try 54'; Jamie-Jerry Taulagi 74'; Con: Matt Brandon 5', 55', 75' (3/3); Cards: Jamie-Jerry Taulagi (yellow card) 15' to 25'; Anthony Fainga'a (yellow card) 22' to 32'	Report; Summary	Try: Jarome McKenzie 24'; Dane Chisholm 39'; Con: Ben Volavola 25' (1/2); Cards: Hugh Perrett (yellow card) 52' to 62'; David Lolohea (yellow card) 67' to 77'	Attendance: 1,500; Referee: (Australia) Rohan Hoffmann

20 September	NSW Country Eagles	16–37	Melbourne Rising (BP)	Wade Park, Orange
15:00 AEST	Try: Sam Windsor 24'; Andrew Kellaway 77'; Con: Sam Windsor 25', 77' (2/2); Cards: Duncan Chubb (yellow card) 17' to 27'	Report; Summary	Try: Nic Stirzaker 19'; Tom English 21'; Sean McMahon 38'; Telusa Veainu 50'; Lopeti Timani 56'; Con: Jack Debreczeni 20', 21', 39', 56' (4/5); Cards: Paul Alo-Emile (yellow card) 40' to 50'; Cadeyrn Neville (yellow card) 69' to 79'	Attendance: 2,000; Referee: (Australia) Michael Hogan

20 September	Sydney Stars	37–37	Canberra Vikings	Leichhardt Oval, Sydney
15:00 AEST	Try: Jack Macklin 31'; Hugo Dessens 37'; Patrick McCutcheon 47'; Will Skelton 61'; Jono Sullivan 80'; Con: Jack Macklin 38', 48', 62', 80' (4/5); Cards: Will Skelton (yellow card) 16' to 26'	Report; Summary	Try: Sean Doyle 9'; Fotu Auelua 11'; Lausii Taliauli 44'; Jesse Mogg 52'; JP Smith 72'; Con: Jesse Mogg 12', 45', 53', 73' (4/5); Cards: Rodney Iona (yellow card) 28' to 38'; Fotu Auelua (yellow card) 57' to 67'	Attendance: 1,047; Referee: (Australia) James Leckie

20 September	North Harbour Rays	32–29	Perth Spirit (BP)	Brookvale Oval, Sydney
17:30 AEST	Try: Harry Bergelin 3'; Sam Ward 28', 47', 70'; Con: Hamish Angus 4', 29', 48', 71' (4/4); Cards: Boyd Killingworth (yellow card) 52' to 62'	Report; Summary	Try: Ammon Matuauto 15', 53'; Zack Holmes 24'; Dillyn Leyds 62'; Con: Zack Holmes 16', 25', 63' (3/4); Cards: Va'a Mailei (yellow card) 58' to 68'	Attendance: 2,187; Referee: (Australia) Angus Gardner

Bye/s: Brisbane City

==== Round 6 ====
25 September	(BP)Melbourne Rising	34–13	Canberra Vikings	AAMI Park, Melbourne
19:30 AEST	Try: Jack Debreczeni 2'; Telusa Veainu 12'; Paul Alo-Emile 19'; Mitch Inman 25'; Luke Burgess 79'; Con: Jack Debreczeni 3', 13', 80' (3/5); Cards: Cadeyrn Neville (yellow card) 53' to 63'; Nic Stirzaker (yellow card) 64' to 74'	Report; Summary	Try: Robbie Coleman 31'; Jerome Nuimata 69'; Con: Jesse Mogg 32' (1/2)	Attendance: 1,977; Referee: (Australia) Will Houston

28 September	Brisbane City	29–13	Queensland Country	Ballymore, Brisbane
15:00 AEST	Try: Pettowa Paraka 32'; Andrew Ready 45'; Chris Kuridrani 61'; Marco Kotze 74'; Con: Jake McIntyre 46' (1/2); Quade Cooper 62', 74' (2/2)	Report; Summary	Try: Jamie-Jerry Taulagi 19'; Tom Pincus 24'; Con: Matt Brandon 25' (1/2); Cards: Haydn Hirsimaki (yellow card) 39' to 49'; Will Slipper (yellow card) 72'	Attendance: 5,000; Referee: (Australia) Damien Mitchelmore

28 September	North Harbour Rays	34–34	Greater Sydney Rams	Brookvale Oval, Sydney
15:00 AEST	Try: Kotoni Ale 22', 30'; Brian Sefanaia 35'; Ed Gower 69'; Con: Matt Lucas 23', 31', 36' (3/3); Hamish Angus 69' (1/1); Pen: Hamish Angus 80' (1/1)	Report; Summary	Try: Ben Batger 38'; Jai Ayoub 54'; Jarome Mackenzie 61'; Dave Lolohea 74'; Con: Dane Chisholm 38', 55', 62', 75' (4/4); Pen: Ben Volavola 79' (1/1); Cards: Guy Millar (yellow card) 69' to 79'	Attendance: 2,900; Referee: (Australia) Michael Hogan

28 September	(BP) Perth Spirit	63–21	Sydney Stars	HBF Arena, Perth
15:30 AWST	Try: Kyle Godwin 12'; Ross Haylett-Petty 19'; Ian Prior 25'; Luke Morahan 27'; Junior Rasolea 43', 49'; Robbie Abel 62', 74'; Marcel Brache 66'; Con: Ian Prior 13', 26', 44', 50', 64', 67' (6/9); Cards: Junior Rasolea (yellow card) 80'	Report; Summary	Try: Laurie Weeks 6'; Andrew Leota 9'; Paddy Ryan 69'; Con: Jack Macklin 10', 70' (2/3); Cards: Matthew Philip (yellow card) 62' to 72'	Attendance: 1,445; Referee: (Australia) Graham Cooper

Bye/s: NSW Country Eagles

==== Round 7 ====
2 October	Canberra Vikings	21–21	North Harbour Rays	Viking Park, Canberra
19:30 AEST	Try: Nigel Ah Wong 8'; Jarrad Butler 46'; Robbie Coleman 56'; Con: Jesse Mogg 47', 57' (2/3); Pen: Jesse Mogg (0/1); Cards: Jordan Smiler (yellow card) 69' to 79'; Seilala Lam (yellow card) 73'	Report; Summary	Try: Kotoni Ale 38'; Luke Holmes 54'; Jack Dempsey 70'; Con: Harry Jones 38', 55' (2/3); Cards: Kotoni Ale (yellow card) 45' to 55'	Attendance: 1,500; Referee: (Australia) Andrew Lees

3 October	(BP)Greater Sydney Rams	56–29	Brisbane City	Pirtek Stadium, Sydney
19:30 AEST	Try: Jarome Mackenzie 4', 23'; Henry Seavula 14'; Auvasa Faleali'i 35'; Henry Taefu 46'; Dylan Sigg 51'; Chris Alcock 65'; Con: Ben Volavola 5', 15', 24', 36', 47', 52', 66' (7/7); Cards: Jed Gillespie (yellow card) 54' to 64'; Marcus Carbone (yellow card) 72'; Hugh Roach (yellow card) 74'	Report; Summary	Try: Chris Kuridrani 17'; Curtis Browning 31'; Samu Kerevi 43'; David McDuling 77'; Con: Quade Cooper 18', 43' (2/3); Jake McIntyre 77' (1/1)	Attendance: 1,632; Referee: (Australia) Ian Smith

4 October	(BP)Perth Spirit	68–29	Queensland Country	Rockingham Rugby Club, Perth
15:30 AWST	Try: Christian Joubert 3'; Kane Koteka 8', 32', 63'; Robbie Abel 24', 48'; Luke Morahan 38'; Brynard Stander 42'; Joe Savage 67'; Va'a Mailei 69'; Con: Zack Holmes 25', 39', 44', 64', 68' (5/9); Ian Prior 70' (1/1); Cards: Sam Wykes (yellow card) 52' to 62'	Report; Summary	Try: Jack de Guingand 10', 17', 53'; Blake Enever 60'; Con: Matt Brandon 11', 53', 61' (3/4)	Attendance: 1,022; Referee: (Australia) Will Houston

6 October	(BP)Sydney Stars	24–26	NSW Country Eagles	Leichhardt Oval, Sydney
15:00 AEDT	Try: James Dargaville 2'; Sam Quinn 18'; Jim Stewart 56'; Con: Jack Macklin 3', 19', 37' (3/3); Cards: Sam Quinn (yellow card) 28' to 38'; Paddy Ryan (yellow card) 40' to 50'	Report; Summary	Try: Ethan Ford 26', 31'; Tala Gray 40'; Cameron Treloar 71'; Con: Sam Windsor 28', 40' (2/4); Cards: Mitchell Chapman (yellow card) 17' to 27'; Ethan Ford (yellow card) 34' to 44'	Attendance: 1,200; Referee: (Australia) Angus Gardner

Bye/s: Melbourne Rising

==== Round 8 ====
9 October	North Harbour Rays	26–77	Brisbane City (BP)	Brookvale Oval, Sydney
19:30 AEDT	Try: Sam Ward 35'; Greg Peterson 56'; Harry Bergelin 64'; Mali Hingano 68'; Con: Harry Jones 35' (1/1); Hamish Angus 56' (1/3); Cards: Chazz Mahina (yellow card) 63' to 73'	Report; Summary	Try: Matthew Feaunati 2'; Michael Gunn 26', 32'; Adam Korczyk 28'; Samu Kerevi 43'; Andrew Ready 52'; Jack Mullins 67'; Curtis Browning 72'; Phil Kite 75'; Toby White 78'; Con: Quade Cooper 3', 26', 28', 32', 44', 67', 72', 76', 79' (9/10)	Attendance: 1,852; Referee: (Australia) Angus Gardner

11 October	(BP)Canberra Vikings	37–42	NSW Country Eagles	Viking Park, Canberra
14:30 AEDT	Try: Jarrad Butler 10'; Michael Henry 36'; Tim Cree 43'; Isaac Thompson 68'; Joe Powell 75'; Con: Rodney Iona 11', 44' (2/3); Isaac Thompson 69', 76' (2/2)	Report; Summary	Try: Andrew Kellaway 7', 59'; Mitchell Chapman 33'; Tala Gray 40'; Ethan Ford 53'; Apakuki Ma'afu 67'; Pen: Sam Windsor 40', 55', 60', 68' (4/6); Cards: Cameron Treloar (yellow card) 26' to 36'	Attendance: 1,500; Referee: (Australia) Rohan Hoffmann

11 October	Greater Sydney Rams	40–58	Melbourne Rising (BP)	Pirtek Stadium, Sydney
15:00 AEDT	Try: Jed Holloway 8'; Henry Seavula 21'; Henry Taefu 34'; Dylan Sigg 54'; Ben Batger 74'; Con: Ben Volavola 9', 22', 35', 55', 75' (5/5)	Report; Summary	Try: Jack Debreczeni 6'; Nic Stirzaker 11'; Joe Kamana 28'; Mitch Inman 49'; Ben Meehan 63'; Luke Jones 71'; Jonah Placid 77', 80'; Con: Jack Debreczeni 7', 12', 49', 64', 72', 80' (6/8)	Attendance: 1,324; Referee: (Australia) Will Houston

11 October	(BP)Queensland Country	53–29	Sydney Stars	Mike Carney Toyota Park, Townsville
15:00 AEST	Try: Jamie-Jerry Taulagi 3', 45'; Tom Pincus 49', 62'; Sam Grasso 60'; Mitch King 66'; James Tuttle 72'; Con: Matt Brandon 4', 50', 61', 63', 67', 73' (6/7); Cards: Tom Pincus (yellow card) 24' to 34'	Report; Summary	Try: Andrew Leota 25'; Stuart Dunbar 77'; Michael Hodge 80'; Con: Angus Roberts 15', 26' (2/2); Jack Macklin 78' (1/2)	Attendance: 2,500; Referee: (Australia) Ed Martin

Bye/s: Perth Spirit

==== Round 9 ====
16 October	Sydney Stars	49–40	North Harbour Rays	Leichhardt Oval, Sydney
19:30 AEDT	Try: Tipiloma Kaveinga 3'; Jake Wainwright 13'; James Willan 21'; Jake Gordon 48', 50'; Michael Hodge 63' penalty try 79'; Con: Angus Roberts 4', 49', 41' (3/5); Jack Macklin 80' (1/2); Pen: Jack Macklin 67' (1/1)	Report; Summary	Try: Kotoni Ale 17'; David Feltscheer 30'; Jack Dempsey 35'; Josh Holmes 41', 54'; Con: Hamish Angus 18', 31', 36', 42' (4/4); Harry Jones 55' (1/1)	Attendance: 750; Referee: (Australia) Ian Smith

18 October	(BP) Brisbane City	37–16	Canberra Vikings	Suncorp Stadium, Brisbane
16:10 AEST	Try: Jack Mullins 15'; Jake McIntyre 19'; Jake Schatz 53', 64'; Will Genia 79'; Con: Jake McIntyre 17', 54', 65' (3/4); Sam Green 80' (1/1); Cards: Curtis Browning (yellow card) 43' to 53'; Chazz Mahina (yellow card) 66' to 76'	Report; Summary	Try: Jarrad Butler 46'; Allan Alaalatoa 72'; Con: Rodney Iona 47' (1/1); Isaac Thompson 72' (1/1)	Attendance: 13,700 (Note: The Round 9 match of Brisbane vs Canberra was the curtain raiser for the Australia vs New Zealand Test. The attendance at the NRC match was 3,516 by half-time and 13,700 at full-time.); Referee: (Australia) Rohan Hoffmann

18 October	NSW Country Eagles	40–34	Perth Spirit (BP)	Caltex Park, Dubbo
18:00 AEDT	Try: Will Miller 1', 23'; Tala Gray 14'; Brendan McKibbin 52'; Darcy Etrich 61'; Con: Sam Windsor 2', 15', 24', 52', 62' (5/5)	Report; Summary	Try: Chris Heiberg 28'; Va'a Mailei 46'; Robbie Abel 56'; Michael Ruru 75', 78'; Con: Luke Burton 30' (1/3); Zack Holmes 76', 79' (2/2)	Attendance: 1,500; Referee: (Australia) Andrew Lees

18 October	(BP) Melbourne Rising	47–26	Queensland Country	AAMI Park, Melbourne
18:00 AEDT	Try: Nic Stirzaker 11', 41'; Jack Debreczeni 16'; Lopeti Timani 32'; Sam Jeffries 51'; Jonah Placid 65'; Sean McMahon 75'; Con: Jack Debreczeni 12', 42', 52', 66' (4/6); Jonah Placid (0/1); Cards: Sean McMahon (yellow card) 44' to 54'; Jack Debreczeni (yellow card) 69' to 79'	Report; Summary	Try: Ben Adams 26'; Matt Brandon 45'; Jamie-Jerry Taulagi 70'; James Tuttle 80'; Con: Matt Brandon 46' (1/2); Tom Pincus 71' (1/1); Duncan Paia'aua (0/1); Cards: Campbell Magnay (yellow card) 55' to 65'; Rubin Fuimaono (yellow card) 67' to 77'	Attendance: 1,924; Referee: (Australia) Damien Mitchelmore

Bye/s: Greater Sydney Rams

== Title play-offs ==
The top four sides in the regular season advanced to the knock-out stage of semi-finals and final to decide the National Rugby Championship title.

=== Semi-finals ===
24 October	NSW Country Eagles	26–32	Brisbane City	Central Coast Stadium, Gosford
19:30 AEDT	Try: Sam Windsor 6'; Samu Wara 14'; Ita Vaea 30'; Ed Stubbs 34'; Con: Sam Windsor 6', 31' (2/4); Cards: Will Miller (yellow card) 20' to 30'	Report; Summary	Try: Brando Va'aulu 2', 53' penalty try 25'; Toby White 56'; Con: Jake McIntyre 3', 26', 54', 57' (4/4)	Attendance: 500; Referee: (Australia) Angus Gardner

25 October	Melbourne Rising	29–45	Perth Spirit	AAMI Park, Melbourne
15:00 AEDT	Try: Mitch Inman 28'; Jonah Placid 49'; Sefa Naivalu 68'; Jack Debreczeni 76'; Con: Jack Debreczeni 29', 53', 69' (3/4)	Report; Summary	Try: Marcel Brache 22', 24'; Ollie Hoskins 42'; Ammon Matuauto 59', 79'; Sam Wykes 66'; Con: Zack Holmes 25', 43', 61', 67', 80' (5/6); Cards: Richard Hardwick (yellow card) 75' to 80'	Attendance: 1,764; Referee: (Australia) Will Houston

=== Final ===
1 November	Brisbane City	37–26	Perth Spirit	Ballymore, Brisbane
18:30 AEST	Try: Liam Gill 8' penalty try 20'; Pettowa Paraka 37', 58'; Junior Laloifi 75'; Con: Jake McIntyre 9', 20', 38', 76' (4/5)	Report; Summary 1 Summary 2	Try: Junior Rasolea 4'; Dane Haylett-Petty 24'; Robbie Abel 34'; Davis Tavita 80+2'; Con: Zack Holmes 5', 35' (2/4)	Attendance: 7,889; Referee: (Australia) Rohan Hoffmann

Brisbane City	Perth Spirit

FB	15	Brando Va'aulu
RW	14	Chris Kuridrani
OC	13	Toby White	(yellow card) 80' to 80+2'
IC	12	Jack Mullins
LW	11	Matthew Feaunati		(substituted off) 72'
FH	10	Jake McIntyre		(substituted off) 77'
SH	9	Nick Frisby
N8	8	Jake Schatz
OF	7	Liam Gill
BF	6	Curtis Browning		(substituted off) 64'
RL	5	David McDuling (c)
LL	4	Marco Kotze		(substituted off) 76'
TP	3	Sef Fa'agase		(substituted off) 66'
HK	2	Andrew Ready
LP	1	Pettowa Paraka		(substituted off) 64'
Replacements:
HK	16	Matt Mafi
PR	17	David Feao		(substituted on) 64'
PR	18	Phil Kite		(substituted on) 66'
LK	19	Tim Buchanan		(substituted on) 76'
FL	20	Adam Korczyk		(substituted on) 64'
SH	21	Will Thompson
FH	22	James Dalgleish		(substituted on) 77'
WG	23	Junior Laloifi		(substituted on) 72'
Coach:
(Australia) Nick Stiles

FB	15	Dane Haylett-Petty
RW	14	Luke Morahan
OC	13	Junior Rasolea
IC	12	Ammon Matuauto	(substituted off) 77'
LW	11	Marcel Brache
FH	10	Zack Holmes
SH	9	Ian Prior	(substituted off) 63'
N8	8	Alex Rovira
OF	7	Richard Hardwick
BF	6	Brynard Stander	(substituted off) 63'
RL	5	Brent Murphy	(substituted off) 76'
LL	4	Sam Wykes (c)
TP	3	Ollie Hoskins
HK	2	Robbie Abel	(substituted off) 63'
LP	1	Pek Cowan	(substituted off) 56'
Replacements:
HK	16	Harry Scoble	(substituted on) 63'
PR	17	Joe Savage	(substituted on) 56'
PR	18	Chris Heiberg
LK	19	Kieran Stringer	(substituted on) 76'
FL	20	Cian O'Connor	(substituted on) 63'
SH	21	Justin Turner	(substituted on) 63'
FH	22	Davis Tavita	(substituted on) 77'
WG	23	Christian Joubert
Coach:
(South Africa) David Wessels (South Africa) Kevin Foote

Man of the Match:
Liam Gill (Brisbane)

Assistant Referees:
Will Houston (Australia)
Damien Mitchelmore (Australia)
Television match official:
Greg Milne (Australia)

== Season attendances ==
Club	Games Hosted	Attendance			
Club	Games Hosted	Lowest	Highest	Average	Total
Brisbane City	5	2,500	13,700	6,499	32,497
Greater Sydney Rams	4	1,063	1,632	1,380	5,519
Melbourne Rising	5	1,764	2,187	1,990	9,948
NSW Country Eagles	5	500	2,000	1,150	5,750
North Harbour Rays	4	1,852	2,900	2,230	8,921
Perth Spirit	4	1,022	2,300	1,692	6,767
Queensland Country	4	1,500	2,500	1,875	7,500
Sydney Stars	4	750	1,500	1,076	4,302
University of Canberra Vikings	4	1,500	2,000	1,625	6,500
Totals	39	500	13,700	2,249	87,704

== Players ==
The leading scorers in 2014 over the regular season and play-offs combined were:

=== Leading try scorers ===
Top 5 try scorers
Pos	Name	Tries	Team
1	Andrew Kellaway	9	NSW Country Eagles
2	Telusa Veainu	8	Melbourne Rising
3	Jack Debreczeni	6	Melbourne Rising
3	Robbie Abel	6	Perth Spirit
3	Lopeti Timani	6	Melbourne Rising
3	Nic Stirzaker	6	Melbourne Rising
3	Jarrad Butler	6	UC Vikings
3	Chris Kuridrani	6	Brisbane City
3	Jarome McKenzie	6	Greater Sydney Rams

Source: rugby.com.au

=== Leading point scorers ===
Top 5 overall point scorers
Pos	Name	Points	Team
1	Jack Debreczeni	144	Melbourne Rising
2	Sam Windsor	88	NSW Country Eagles
3	Jake McIntyre	82	Brisbane City
4	Zack Holmes	77	Perth Spirit
5	Ben Volavola	72	Greater Sydney Rams

Source: rugby.com.au

== See also ==
- Australian Rugby Championship (predecessor tournament)
- Super Rugby
