= Harry Scoble =

Australian rugby union player (born 1994)

- Born: 12 November 1994 (age 32) Perth, Western Australia
- Height: 1.80 m (5 ft 11 in)
- Weight: 103 kg (16 st 3 lb; 227 lb)
- University: The University of Western Australia
- Notable relative: Ted Whitten (great uncle)

Rugby union career
- Position: Hooker
Senior career
Years	Team	Apps	(Points)
2014–	Perth Spirit	13	(5)
2016−	Force	8	(10)
- Correct as of 14 August 2016
International career
Years	Team	Apps	(Points)
2011	Australia Schoolboys		
2014	Australia Under-20	4	(5)
- Correct as of 14 August 2016

Harry Scoble (born 12 November 1994) is an Australian rugby union footballer who currently plays as a hooker for the Force in the international Super Rugby competition. Domestically, he turns out for Perth Spirit in the National Rugby Championship.

== Early career ==
Initially Scoble hailing from an AFL supporting family, Scoble was initially interested in playing AFL as a youngster, however by the age of 9 he had switched to rugby union and started making his way up through the grades playing for The University of Western Australia in his native Western Australia. He represented both Western Australia and Australia at schoolboy and under-20 level as well as being a member of the Future Force program before being selected as a member of the Perth Spirit squad ahead of the inaugural National Rugby Championship in 2014.

== Super Rugby career ==
After 2 years of consistent performances in the NRC, Scoble was named as part of the Western Force's wider training group ahead of the 2016 Super Rugby season. Injuries to first choice hookers Nathan Charles and Heath Tessmann saw Scoble thrust into the limelight as the franchise's starting number 2 for the second half of the campaign. In total he earned 8 caps, 7 of which were from the start and scored 2 tries including one on debut against the Waratahs.

== International ==
Scoble represented Australia at schoolboy level in 2011 and was a member of the Australia under-20 side which competed in the 2014 IRB Junior World Championship in New Zealand.

== Super Rugby statistics ==
As of 14 August 2016

Season	Team	Games	Starts	Sub	Mins	Tries	Cons	Pens	Drops	Points	Yel	Red
2016	Force	8	7	1	532	2	0	0	0	10	0	0
Total		8	7	1	532	2	0	0	0	10	0	0
