= Matt Mafi =

- Full name: Matthew Mafi
- Born: 26 May 1993 (age 33) Sydney, Australia
- Height: 1.78 m (5 ft 10 in)
- Weight: 118 kg (18 st 8 lb; 260 lb)
- School: St Joseph's College, Nudgee
- University: Sydney University

Rugby union career
- Position: Hooker
- Current team: Brisbane City
Youth career
- Sunnybank
Amateur team(s)
Years	Team	Apps	(Points)
2012−13	Sydney University	10	(0)
2015−	Brothers	35	
Senior career
Years	Team	Apps	(Points)
2014−	Brisbane City	21	(0)
2016	Reds	4	(0)
- Correct as of 17 August 2016
International career
Years	Team	Apps	(Points)
2008	Australia Schoolboys		
- Correct as of 17 August 2016

Matt Mafi (born 26 May 1993) is an Australian rugby union hooker who currently plays for Brisbane City in Australia's National Rugby Championship. He has also previously represented Super Rugby side, the Queensland Reds.

== Early/provincial career ==
Mafi was born in Sydney, but attended school in Brisbane at St Joseph's College, Nudgee. He was picked to represent Queensland at schoolboy level in 2008 and played his early junior rugby with the Sunnybank rugby club. He then moved back to Sydney to attend Sydney University where he played some Shute Shield rugby and also won the Colts Premiership with them in 2011. After graduating university it was back to Queensland again this time to play in the local Queensland Premier Rugby competition with Brothers and later in the National Rugby Championship with Brisbane City with whom he was a champion in both 2014 and 2015.

== Super Rugby career ==
After 2 successful seasons with Brisbane City, Mafi was called into the Reds Super Rugby squad during the 2016 Super Rugby season to provide injury cover for Saia Fainga'a. In total, he made 4 substitute appearances during the campaign.

== International ==
Mafi was an Australian Schoolboys representative in 2008.

== Super Rugby statistics ==
As of 17 August 2016

Season	Team	Games	Starts	Sub	Mins	Tries	Cons	Pens	Drops	Points	Yel	Red
2016	Reds	4	0	4	19	0	0	0	0	0	0	0
Total		4	0	4	19	0	0	0	0	0	0	0
