= David McDuling =

Australian rugby union player

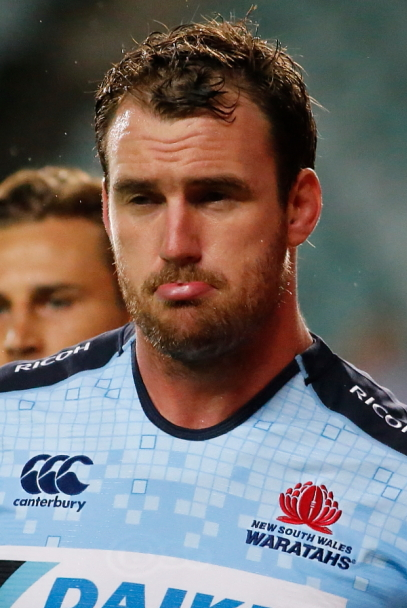
- Born: 7 April 1989 (age 37) Sydney, New South Wales, Australia
- Height: 1.96 m (6 ft 5 in)
- Weight: 115 kg (18 st 2 lb; 254 lb)
- School: Saint Ignatius' College, Riverview

Rugby union career
- Position: Lock
- Current team: Waratahs
Senior career
Years	Team	Apps	(Points)
2014–2015	Reds	12	(0)
2014	Brisbane City	10	(5)
2015	Sharks (Currie Cup)	8	(0)
2016	Sharks	1	(0)
2016	Sharks XV	11	(5)
2016	Canterbury	9	(10)
2017–present	Waratahs	16	(0)
- Correct as of 29 October 2016
International career
Years	Team	Apps	(Points)
2009	Australia Under-20	5	(0)
- Correct as of 3 July 2015

David McDuling (born 7 April 1989) is a rugby union footballer for the Waratahs in Super Rugby. He usually plays as a lock, and previously played with the Reds and Sharks Super Rugby teams. He also played for Canterbury in the New Zealand Mitre 10 Cup competition.

He was educated at Saint Ignatius' College, Riverview.

== Career ==
=== Queensland Reds / Brisbane City ===
McDuling joined the Reds Academy in 2011; he was named in their squad for the 2012 Super Rugby season, but did not make any appearances due to an anterior cruciate ligament knee injury. He suffered another knee injury upon his return that also ruled him out of the entire 2013 season.

He eventually made his Super Rugby debut on 11 May 2014 when he came on as a substitute in their match against the Crusaders in Brisbane. He made a further four appearances off the bench during the competition.

In the second half of 2014, McDuling also played for and captained Brisbane City in the first edition of the National Rugby Championship. He played in all eight of their regular season matches, scoring one try in their 29–56 defeat to the Greater Sydney Rams in Round Seven of the competition. He also played in their 32–26 semi-final win over the NSW Country Eagles and captained the side in the final, helping them to a 37–26 victory over the Perth Spirit to be crowned champions.

He returned to the Reds lineup for the 2015 Super Rugby season. After playing off the bench against the Force, he started his first match for the Reds against the Highlanders in Dunedin. He made a total of five starts and two substitute appearances during the season.

=== Sharks ===
After the 2015 Super Rugby season, McDuling was granted an early release from his contract by the Reds and he joined the South Africa-based Sharks on a deal until the end of 2016.

=== Waratahs ===
He returned to his hometown of Sydney to join the Waratahs prior to the 2017 Super Rugby season where he featured in every matchday squad of the season, earning 16 caps.

=== Representative rugby ===
McDuling was part of the Australian Schoolboys team in 2007 and of the Australia under 20 team that competed in the 2009 IRB Junior World Championship.
