= Tom Murday =

Australian rugby union player

- Born: Thomas Murday; 24 April 1989 (age 37) Mossman, Australia
- Height: 200 cm (6 ft 7 in)
- Weight: 112 kg (17 st 9 lb)
- School: Brisbane Grammar School

Rugby union career
- Position: Lock / Flank
Senior career
Years	Team	Apps	(Points)
2015–2020	Agen	94	(20)
2021–	Toyota Industries Shuttles	1	(0)
- Correct as of 22 February 2021
Provincial / State sides
Years	Team	Apps	(Points)
2013–14	Northland	21	(5)
Super Rugby
Years	Team	Apps	(Points)
2014	Blues	0	(0)
2015	Reds	4	(0)
- Correct as of 11 April 2015
International career
Years	Team	Apps	(Points)
2008	Australia U20		
2006	Australian Schoolboys		

Tom Murday (born 24 April 1989) is an Australian rugby union footballer. He is currently signed to the French club Agen and previously played for the Queensland Reds in the Super Rugby competition. His usual position is lock, however he can also play in the backrow.

== Early life ==
Murday was raised in Mossman in North Queensland, and he played junior club rugby for the Port Douglas Reef Raiders as a teenager. He attended Brisbane Grammar School and played for the Australian Schoolboys rugby team in 2006.

== Career ==
Murday was selected for the Australia U20 team that played in the 2008 IRB Junior World Championship in Wales. He joined the RugbyWA Academy later that season and toured to the UK with the Force development side.

In 2009 and 2010 Murday played with Sunnybank in the Queensland Premier Rugby competition. He moved to the ACT to play for the Tuggeranong Vikings rugby club in 2011 and was selected for the Brumby Runners team that played in the 2012 Pacific Rugby Cup.

Murday played for two seasons in New Zealand's ITM Cup with Northland in 2013 and 2014. He was also a member of the Blues extended squad, and won the World Club 10s title with the Auckland team in 2014.

Returning to Brisbane to join the Queensland Reds, he made his Super Rugby debut against the Force at Lang Park on 21 February 2015.

Murday signed a two-year deal with French club SU Agen Lot-et-Garonne in mid-2015.
