= Pettowa Paraka =

- Born: Pettowa Leeroy Paraka; 16 November 1993 (age 33) Mount Hagen, Papua New Guinea
- Height: 1.75 m (5 ft 9 in)
- Weight: 120 kg (18 st 13 lb)
- School: The Southport School

Rugby union career
- Position(s): Prop, Hooker
Amateur team(s)
Years	Team	Apps	(Points)
2012–pres.	Easts		
Senior career
Years	Team	Apps	(Points)
2014–2016	Brisbane City	25	(30)
- Correct as of 9 October 2016
Super Rugby
Years	Team	Apps	(Points)
2015–2016	Queensland Reds	6	(0)
- Correct as of 21 July 2016
International career
Years	Team	Apps	(Points)
2012–2013	Australia U20	9	
2011	Australian Schoolboys	1	

Pettowa Paraka (born 16 November 1993) is a Papua New Guinean-born Australian professional rugby union player for the Queensland Reds in the Super Rugby competition. He is mainly a loosehead prop, although he can play all three front row positions.

== Family and early life ==
Paraka's family are from the village of Baiyer in the Western Highlands of Papua New Guinea. He was born in the provincial capital of Mount Hagen. Paraka was introduced to rugby union when he moved to the Gold Coast in Australia for his secondary education at The Southport School where he was a boarding student. He was selected for the Australian Schoolboys rugby team in his final year at Southport in 2011.

== Rugby career ==
Paraka joined Easts Tigers Rugby in 2012 and was a member of the club's Premier Rugby grand final winning team in 2013. He was selected for the Australia U20 team that competed at the IRB Junior World Championship in South Africa in 2012.

In 2013 Paraka was invited into the Queensland Reds wider training squad. Paraka played for Reds A in the 2014 Pacific Rugby Cup, starting in all four matches as the teams's loosehead prop. Later that year he joined the Brisbane City team in the inaugural National Rugby Championship. He scored two tries in the grand final match against Perth Spirit to secure Brisbane's championship win in 2014.

After having been named on the bench twice for the Reds in 2014 without making it onto the field, Paraka made his Super Rugby debut on 14 March 2015 for the Reds against the Brumbies in Brisbane.
