= James Dargaville =

Australian rugby union footballer

- Full name: James Dargaville
- Born: 25 April 1992 (age 34) Southport, Australia
- Height: 1.87 m (6 ft 2 in)
- Weight: 94 kg (14 st 11 lb; 207 lb)
- School: Mater Maria Catholic College

Rugby union career
- Position(s): Wing, Centre, Full-back
Youth career
- 2011: Warringah
- 2012: Sydney University
Amateur team(s)
Years	Team	Apps	(Points)
2013–	Sydney University	41	(125)
Senior career
Years	Team	Apps	(Points)
2015–2018	Brumbies	35	(20)
2014	Sydney Stars	8	(15)
2015–2017	Canberra Vikings	21	(57)
2018	North Harbour	6	(0)
2019	Panasonic Wild Knights	5	(0)
2020	Sunwolves	5	(5)
2021–2022	Yamaha Júbilo	0	(0)
- Correct as of 21 February 2021
International career
Years	Team	Apps	(Points)
2012	Australia Under-20	3	(5)
- Correct as of 21 February 2021

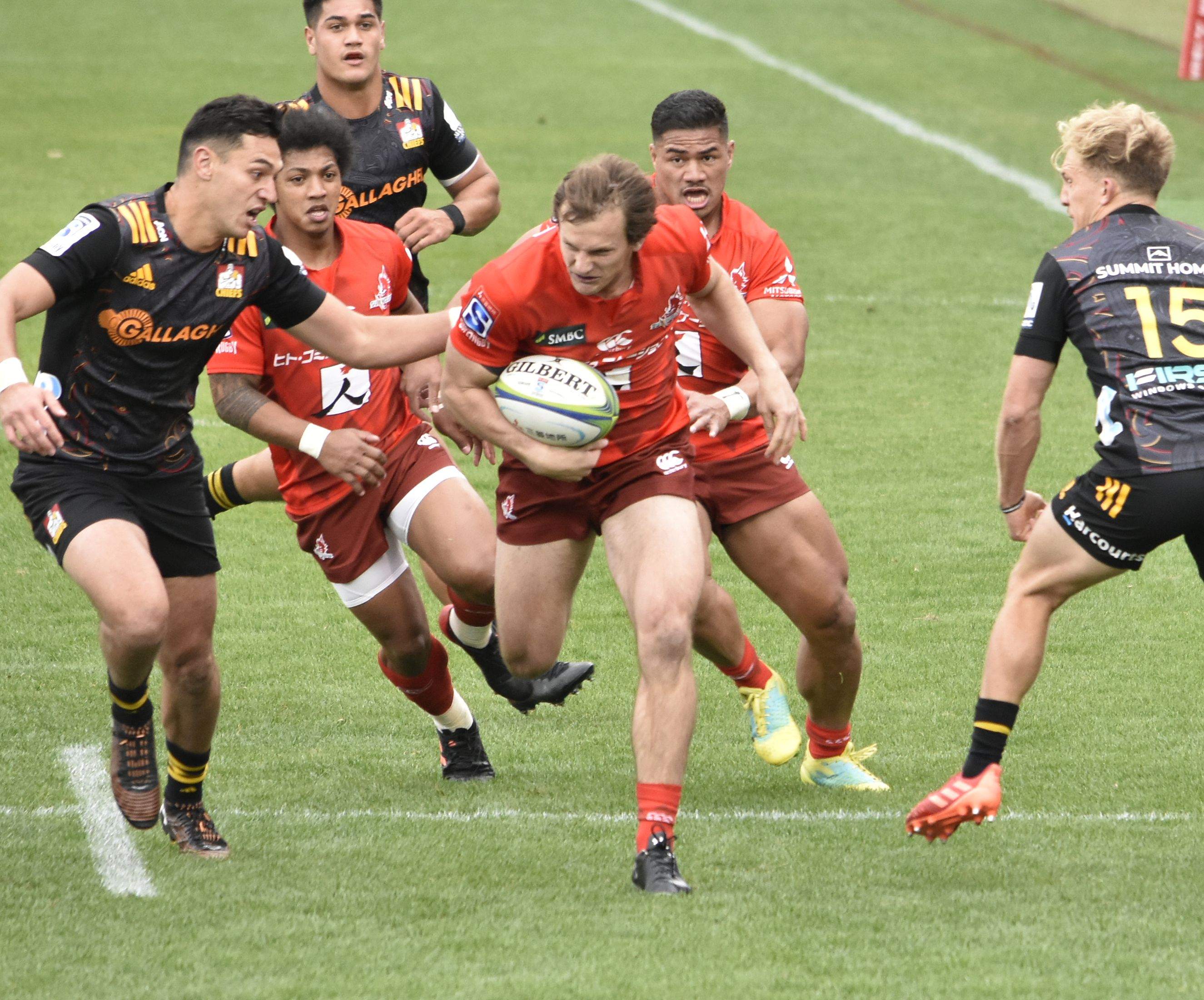
James Dargaville, in possession of the ball

James Dargaville (born 25 April 1992) is an Australian rugby union footballer who currently plays as a wing for the New South Wales Country Eagles in the National Rugby Championship, following stints with the Brumbies and North Harbour. He also represented the Sydney Stars in the inaugural National Rugby Championship. He has occasionally played as a centre as well.

== Career ==
Dargaville started out his rugby career playing colts level rugby for Warringah and later Sydney University. He progressed to the Sydney Uni Shute Shield team in 2013 and was an instant hit scoring 24 tries in his first 2 seasons. This devastating form alerted the newly formed Sydney Stars who signed him up for the first ever National Rugby Championship season in 2014 where he scored 3 tries in 8 appearances. Several Super Rugby sides were known to be chasing his services ahead of the 2015 Super Rugby season, however he chose to head south to Canberra to join up with the Brumbies.

== International career ==
Dargaville was a member of the Australia Under-20 side which competed in the 2012 IRB Junior World Championship in South Africa.

== Super Rugby statistics ==
As of 25 July 2016

Season	Team	Games	Starts	Sub	Mins	Tries	Cons	Pens	Drops	Points	Yel	Red
2015	Brumbies	12	2	10	371	1	0	0	0	5	0	0
2016	Brumbies	9	5	4	510	1	0	0	0	5	0	0
Total		21	7	14	881	2	0	0	0	10	0	0
