= Guy Millar =

Australian rugby union player

- Born: Guy Millar; 23 April 1992 (age 34) Cape Town, South Africa
- Height: 1.86 m (6 ft 1 in)
- Weight: 117 kg (18 st 6 lb)
- School: The King's School, Parramatta

Rugby union career
- Position: Prop
Senior career
Years	Team	Apps	(Points)
2011–2013	University	2	(5)
2014–2015	Eastwood	19	(5)
2014	Greater Sydney Rams	8	(0)
2018−pres.	Biarritz	49	(0)
- Correct as of 26 October 2018
Provincial / State sides
Years	Team	Apps	(Points)
2015−2017	Southland	30	(5)
- Correct as of 14 October 2017
Super Rugby
Years	Team	Apps	(Points)
2015–2016	Force	14	(0)
2017−2018	Highlanders	3	(0)
- Correct as of 6 July 2018
International career
Years	Team	Apps	(Points)
2010	Australian Schoolboys		

Guy Millar (born 23 April 1992) is an Australian rugby union footballer who plays as a prop for the French club Biarritz Olympique. He previously played for the Dunedin-based Highlanders and Western Force teams in the Super Rugby competition.

== Family and early life ==
Millar was born in Cape Town, South Africa. When he was 14 years old, he moved with his parents to Australia where he attended The King's School in Sydney. He played for the Australian Schoolboys rugby team in 2010.

He has been dating Lauren Ryan since 2011.

== Career ==
Millar played club rugby for Sydney University and was invited into the NSW Waratahs Academy in 2011 before joining the ARU's national academy for the 2012 and 2013 seasons. In 2014 he switched to play for Eastwood and was a member of the club's Shute Shield premiership-winning side.

Millar signed with the Greater Sydney Rams later in 2014 year to play in the inaugural season of the National Rugby Championship. In 2015 he was signed to a short-term contract with the Force, and he made his Super Rugby debut off the bench against the Blues in May 2015.

== Super Rugby statistics ==
As of 25 July 2016

Season	Team	Games	Starts	Sub	Min	T	C	PG	DG	Pts	YC	RC
2015	Force	4	1	3	83	0	0	0	0	0	0	0
2016	Force	10	7	3	575	0	0	0	0	0	0	0
2017	Highlanders	2	0	2	44	0	0	0	0	0	0	0
2018	Highlanders	1	0	1	15	0	0	0	0	0	0	0
Total		17	8	9	717	0	0	0	0	0	0	0
