= Tom Sexton (rugby union) =

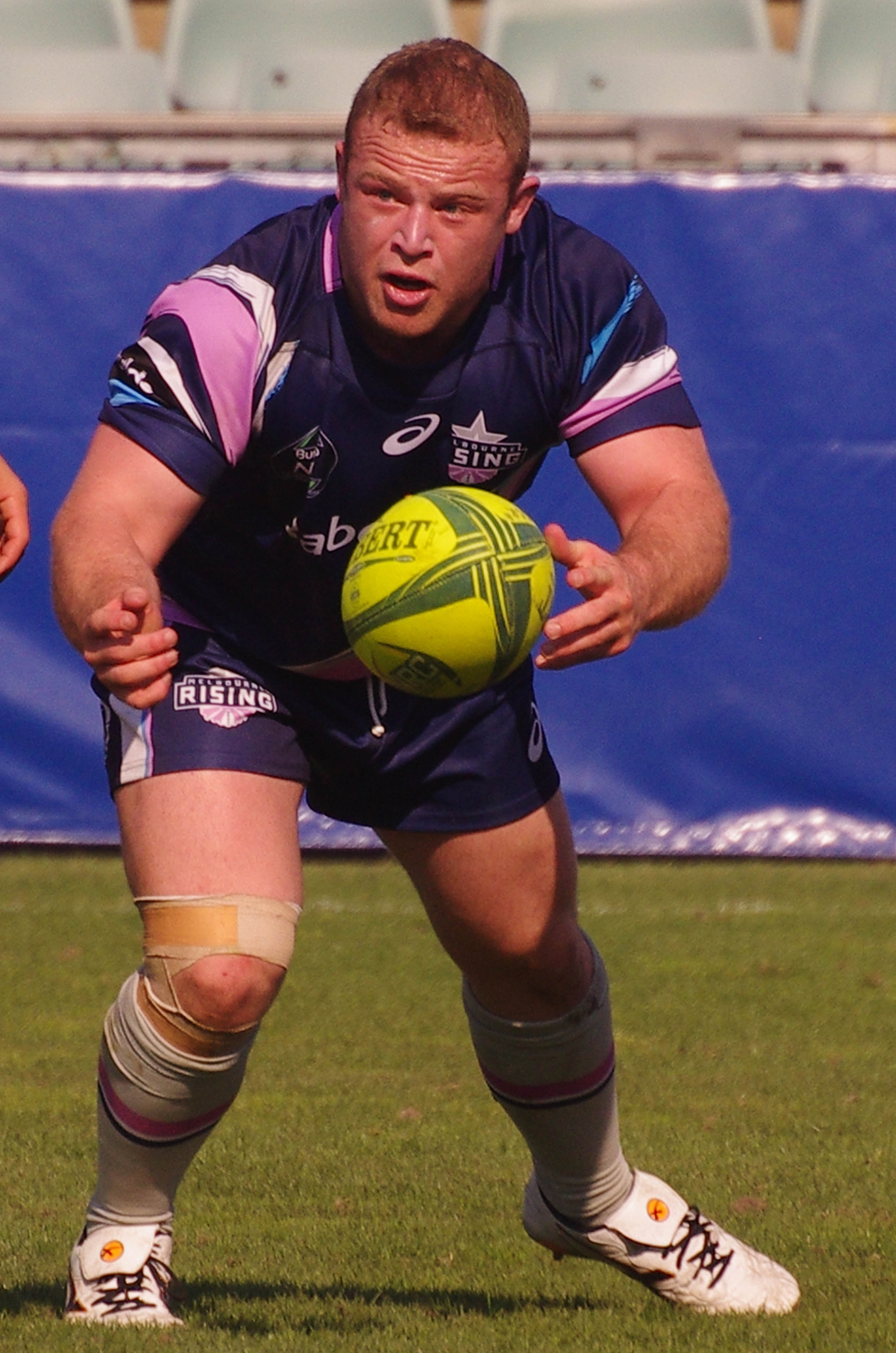
- Sexton in 2014
- Born: Thomas Sexton/T-Pot; 10 December 1989 (age 36) Melbourne
- Height: 1.78 m (5 ft 10 in)
- Weight: 103 kg (227 lb)
- School: Belvedere College

Rugby union career
- Position: Hooker
- Current team: Suttonians RFC
Senior career
| Years | Team | Apps | (Points) |
| 2008–13 | Leinster | 8 | (0) |
| 2014 | Melbourne Rising | 9 | (0) |
| 2015 | NSW Country Eagles | 8 | (5) |
| 2017 | Randwick | 7 | |
| 2017-present | Suttonians | | |
- Correct as of 26 October 2015
Super Rugby
| Years | Team | Apps | (Points) |
| 2014–15 | Rebels | 5 | (0) |
| 2016 | Force | | (0) |
- Correct as of 20 July 2016
International career
| Years | Team | Apps | (Points) |
| 2009 | Ireland U20 | 9 | (5) |
- Correct as of 26 October 2015

Tom Sexton (born 10 December 1989) is a professional rugby union player who plays for The Western Force in the Super Rugby competition. His usual position is hooker.

== Early life ==
Sexton was born in Melbourne, and left Australia at age four. Sexton was educated at Belvedere College in Dublin. He won a Leinster Schools Junior Cup with Belvedere and also captained his school to a tenth Leinster Schools Senior Cup win in 2008. During his schools rugby career he played for Leinster schools (at both u-18 and u-19 age levels) as well as the Irish schools' u-18 and u-19 sides.

== Professional career ==
Sexton was offered an academy contract at Leinster. The following season, Tom was a permanent fixture in the Ireland under-20 team for the six nations and the Junior World Championship in Japan. He also captained this side on a couple of occasions, a team containing current Ireland internationals, Peter O'Mahony, Ian Madigan and Conor Murray. He has over 20 caps for the Leinster "A" side, including games in the British and Irish Cup. He made eight appearances for Leinster's Senior team under Joe Schmidt, his debut coming against Connacht on New Year's Day 2011 in the Pro12 League. In April 2013, Tom was part of the All Ireland League winning side with Lansdowne FC. Sexton also completed Law Degree ( L.L.B) from Trinity College, Dublin in 2013. In June 2016, Tom was a member of the Western Force team that won the World Club 10's tournament in Mauritius. The Tournament featured clubs such as the Brumbies, Saracens and Toulon.

He has been capped twice for Ireland Under-19 and nine times for Ireland Under-20.

== Move to Australia ==
In 2013, Sexton returned to Australia to join the Melbourne Rebels for the 2014 season. Sexton missed the 2014 Super Rugby season with an ACL injury, making his return to play during the inaugural 2014 National Rugby Championship with The Melbourne Rising. He then made his Super Rugby Debut for the Rebels on the 27 March 2015 against The Hurricanes in Wellington. Sexton went on to earn five caps for the Rebels. In October 2015, it was announced that Sexton had signed a deal with The Western Force for the 2016 Super Rugby season.

== Super Rugby statistics ==
As of 25 July 2016

| Season | Team | Games | Starts | Sub | Mins | Tries | Cons | Pens | Drops | Points | Yel | Red |
|---|---|---|---|---|---|---|---|---|---|---|---|---|
| 2014 | Rebels | 0 | 0 | 0 | 0 | 0 | 0 | 0 | 0 | 0 | 0 | 0 |
| 2015 | Rebels | 5 | 0 | 5 | 99 | 0 | 0 | 0 | 0 | 0 | 0 | 0 |
| 2016 | Force | 0 | 0 | 0 | 0 | 0 | 0 | 0 | 0 | 0 | 0 | 0 |
| Total | | 5 | 0 | 5 | 99 | 0 | 0 | 0 | 0 | 0 | 0 | 0 |
