= Mitch Inman =

Australian rugby union player

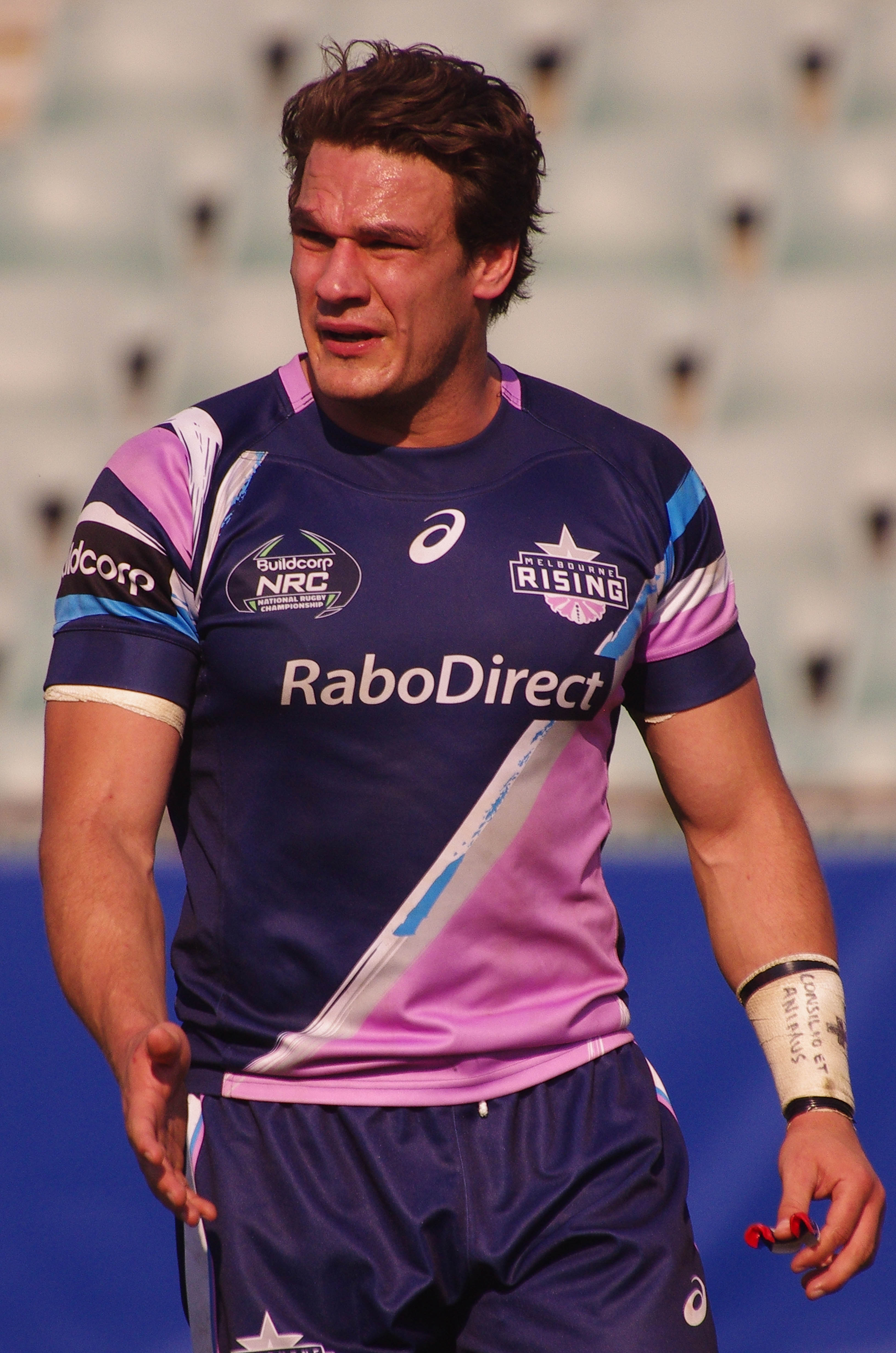
- Inman in 2014
- Born: Mitchell Inman; 24 October 1988 (age 38) Sydney, New South Wales, Australia
- Height: 1.91 m (6 ft 3 in)
- Weight: 105 kg (16 st 7 lb)
- School: Saint Ignatius' College, Sydney

Rugby union career
- Position: Centre
Senior career
Years	Team	Apps	(Points)
2014	Melbourne Rising	9	(20)
2015	Toulon	6	(0)
2017–	Oyonnax	42	(30)
- Correct as of 6 November 2017
Super Rugby
Years	Team	Apps	(Points)
2010–2011	Force	19	(0)
2012–2017	Rebels	82	(30)
- Correct as of 6 November 2017

Mitch Inman (born 24 October 1988) is an Australian rugby union footballer. His regular playing position is either centre or wing . He represents the Rebels in Super Rugby.

== Playing history ==
Inman is a graduate of Saint Ignatius' College in Sydney. His club was Sydney University where he was coached by 2012 Rebels coach Damien Hill. In the 2008 Shute Shield final Inman and his brother Dane found themselves in opposing teams: Mitch for Sydney Uni and Dane for Randwick.

In 2009 Inman trialled with the NSW Waratahs and toured with them to Fiji. He moved to Perth in 2010 and made his Super Rugby debut for the Western Force against the Brumbies. He played every round of the Force's 2010 season. He returned to NSW later in 2010 to help Sydney Uni contest the Shute Shield final, again, against Randwick. The teams included Wallabies Berrick Barnes for the students, and Kurtley Beale for Randwick. For the start of the 2011 Super Rugby season he was back in Perth with the Force but suffered a serious elbow injury during the round three clash with the Sharks. Later in 2011 he played at No. 13 outside James O'Connor at #12.

Inman signed, in mid-2011, a two-year contract with the Melbourne Rebels to commence in 2012. Other new recruits would include Beale (Waratahs), O'Connor (Force) and Paul Alo-Emile (Force).

== International experience ==
Inman is a former Australian under-19s and Australian Sevens representative.

== Super Rugby statistics ==
As of 21 July 2016

Season	Team	Games	Starts	Sub	Mins	Tries	Cons	Pens	Drops	Points	Yel	Red
2010	Force	13	9	4	703	0	0	0	0	0	0	0
2011	Force	6	5	1	333	0	0	0	0	0	0	0
2012	Rebels	12	12	0	948	0	0	0	0	0	0	0
2013	Rebels	15	15	0	1176	3	0	0	0	15	0	0
2014	Rebels	16	16	0	1266	2	0	0	0	10	1	0
2015	Rebels	16	16	0	1280	1	0	0	0	5	0	0
2016	Rebels	10	10	0	790	0	0	0	0	0	0	0
2017	Rebels	13	12	1	963	0	0	0	0	0	0	0
Total		101	95	6	7459	6	0	0	0	30	1	0
