= Jim Stewart (rugby union) =

- Born: 5 January 1992 (age 34) Mona Vale, Australia
- Height: 1.75 m (5 ft 9 in)
- Weight: 95 kg (14 st 13 lb; 209 lb)
- School: Scots College

Rugby union career
- Position: Centre
- Current team: Sydney Stars
Amateur team(s)
Years	Team	Apps	(Points)
2012–2016	Sydney University	47	(80)
Senior career
Years	Team	Apps	(Points)
2014–2015	Sydney Stars	17	(25)
2016	Waratahs	7	(0)
- Correct as of 22 July 2016
International career
Years	Team	Apps	(Points)
2011–12	Australia Schools		
2014	Australia U20	4	(5)
- Correct as of 9 November 2015

Jim Stewart (born 5 January 1994) is a retired Australian Rugby Union player who played for the Waratahs in Super Rugby competition. He was also a member of the Sydney Stars team that competed in the National Rugby Championship. His regular playing position is centre.

Jim Stewart represented Australia at schoolboy and under-20 level. He was a regular starter for the under 20s.
