= Siliva Siliva =

Australian rugby union player (born 1991)

- Born: Siliva Siliva; 11 February 1991 (age 35) Melbourne, Victoria, Australia
- Height: 1.77 m (5 ft 9 1/2 in)
- Weight: 112 kg (17 st 9 lb)
- School: Narre Warren South P-12 College
- Notable relative(s): Aaron Edwards (cousin); Maria Tutaia (2nd cousin); Keith Peters (2nd cousin)

Rugby union career
- Position: Hooker
Senior career
Years	Team	Apps	(Points)
2014	Canberra Vikings	0	(0)
2015–2016	Greater Sydney Rams	8	(0)
2016–	Melbourne Rising	13	(0)
- Correct as of 5 November 2017
Super Rugby
Years	Team	Apps	(Points)
2011	Force	0	(0)
2012–15	Brumbies	17	(5)
2016–2017	Rebels	10	(0)
- Correct as of 5 November 2017
International career
Years	Team	Apps	(Points)
2010–11	Australia U20	8	(5)
- Correct as of 4 August 2013

Siliva Siliva (born 11 February 1991) is an Australian rugby union player who plays for the Brumbies in Super Rugby. His playing position is hooker. He was previously a member of the Western Force squad for the 2011 Super Rugby season although he did not make any first-team appearances. He made his Super Rugby debut for the Brumbies against the Reds in 2013.

Siliva represented Australia under 20 at the 2011 IRB Junior World Championship.

His cousin Aaron Edwards has played AFL with West Coast Eagles, North Melbourne and Richmond; his second cousin Maria Tutaia played netball for the New Zealand Silver Ferns and another second cousin, Keith Peters, played rugby league for Penrith Panthers and Papua New Guinea.

== Super Rugby statistics ==
As of 5 November 2017

Season	Team	Games	Starts	Sub	Mins	Tries	Cons	Pens	Drops	Points	Yel	Red
2011	Force	0	0	0	0	0	0	0	0	0	0	0
2012	Brumbies	0	0	0	0	0	0	0	0	0	0	0
2013	Brumbies	12	2	10	216	1	0	0	0	5	0	0
2014	Brumbies	5	1	4	99	0	0	0	0	0	0	0
2015	Brumbies	0	0	0	0	0	0	0	0	0	0	0
2016	Rebels	1	0	1	25	0	0	0	0	0	0	0
2017	Rebels	9	2	7	247	0	0	0	0	0	0	0
Total		27	5	22	587	1	0	0	0	5	0	0
