= Kotoni Ale =

Tonga international rugby union player

- Born: 3 August 1990 (age 36) Auckland, New Zealand
- Height: 6 ft 0 in (183 cm)
- Weight: 229 lb (104 kg)
- School: St Augustine's College

Rugby union career
- Position: Flanker
International career
| Years | Team | Apps | (Points) |
| 2016– | Tonga | 2 | (0) |

Kotoni Ale (born 3 August 1990) is a Tongan international rugby union player.

Born in Auckland, New Zealand, Ale was educated in Sydney at St Augustine's College and was an Australian Schools representative player, named NSW Schools player of the year in 2008.

Ale, a Manly player, suffered a compound fracture of his ankle when his foot dug into the turf as he was tackled in a Shute Shield fixture against Warringah, an injury which paused the match for 58 minutes while he received treatment.

In 2016, Ale made a successful comeback to rugby after a year on the sidelines, earning a call up for Tonga's November tour of Europe, where he was capped in matches against Spain and the United States.

Ale now teaches at St Augustine's College as a PDHPE teacher.

== See also ==
- List of Tonga national rugby union players
