= Kirisi Kuridrani =

Australian rugby union player

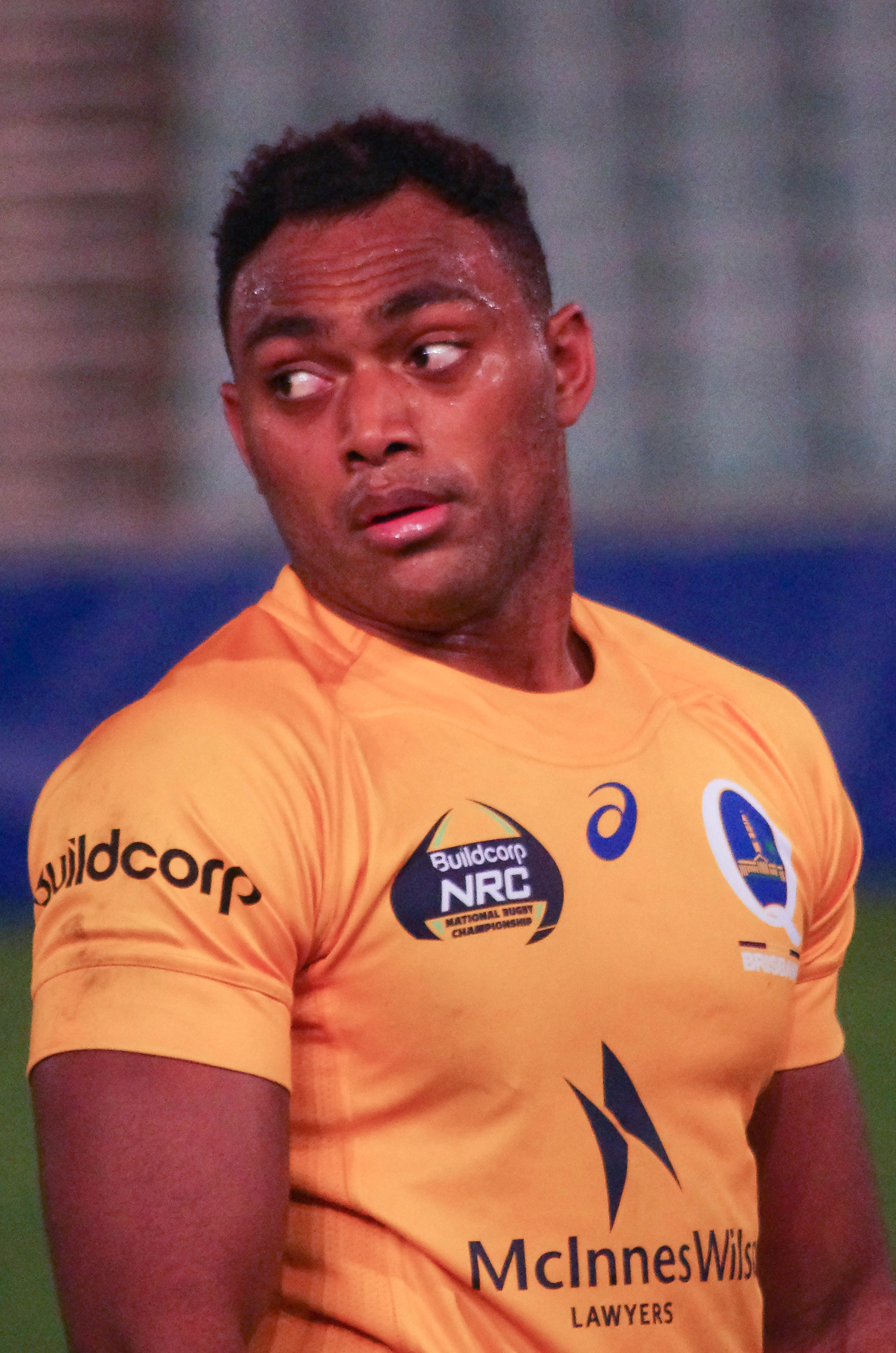
- Born: Kirisi Nasiganiyavi; 12 December 1991 (age 34) Brisbane, Australia
- Height: 1.90 m (6 ft 3 in)
- Weight: 99 kg (15 st 8 lb)
- School: Ipswich Grammar School; Marsden State High School
- Notable relative(s): Nemani Nadolo (brother); Tevita Kuridrani (cousin)

Rugby union career
- Position(s): Wing, Fullback
Amateur team(s)
Years	Team	Apps	(Points)
2011–2017	GPS Old Boys		
Senior career
Years	Team	Apps	(Points)
2014–2017	Brisbane City	32	(82)
2018–pres.	Honda Heat	8	
- Correct as of 28 October 2017
Super Rugby
Years	Team	Apps	(Points)
2014–2017	Queensland Reds	25	(20)
- Correct as of 2 June 2017
International career
Years	Team	Apps	(Points)
2011	Australia U20	2	(5)
2010	Fiji U20	4	(5)

Kirisi Kuridrani (born 12 December 1991), formerly Kirisi Nasiganiyavi, is an Australian rugby union player of Fijian descent. He is currently signed to Japanese club Honda Heat and previously played for the Queensland Reds in Super Rugby. His usual position is wing.

== Family and early life ==
Kirisi Nasiganiyavi was born in Brisbane, where his father Isei Nasiganiyavi played rugby for Queensland. He is the younger brother of Nemani Nadolo (who was named Ratu Nasiganiyavi before he adopted their mother's maiden name of Nadolo in 2009) and a cousin of Tevita Kuridrani; in 2011 he adopted the Kuridrani family name.

During his junior career he was selected for several representative teams, including Queensland Under-16s. He attended Marsden State High School and Ipswich Grammar, and represented Queensland at the Australian Schools Rugby Championships in 2008 and 2009.

== Rugby career ==
In 2010, he played colts rugby for GPS Old Boys and was chosen for the Brisbane Under-19 team later that year. He was selected for the Fiji Under-20 team and played in the 2010 IRB Junior World Championship in Argentina, and scored a try against New Zealand in the opening pool game.

Chris Kuridrani briefly switched codes at the start of 2011. He played rugby league in the Toyota Cup for the Brisbane Broncos for five rounds before returning to play Premier Rugby with GPS and train with the Queensland Reds squad. He was selected as an injury replacement for the Australia Under-20 team at the 2011 IRB Junior World Championship in Italy, and scored a try in the semi-final against New Zealand.

He was a member of the ARU's National Academy in 2013, and participated in the Pacific Rugby Cup, including playing one match for the Brisbane Academy against his brother, Nemani Nadolo, who played for Fiji Warriors.

He currently plays for Counties Manukau in the Mitre 10 Cup.

On 12 November 2019 he was selected in the Highlanders squad for the 2020 Super Rugby tournament.
