= Andrew Ready =

- Born: Andrew Ready; 11 July 1993 (age 33) Brisbane, Queensland
- Height: 1.80 m (5 ft 11 in)
- Weight: 107 kg (16 st 12 lb; 236 lb)
- School: Gregory Terrace

Rugby union career
- Position: Hooker
- Current team: Easts
Amateur team(s)
Years	Team	Apps	(Points)
2012–	Easts		
Senior career
Years	Team	Apps	(Points)
2014−18	Brisbane City	32	(40)
2018-19	Rugby Southland	8	(0)
- Correct as of 24 July 2021
Super Rugby
Years	Team	Apps	(Points)
2015–18	Queensland Reds	30	(15)
2020-2022	Western Force	31	(40)
- Correct as of 06 January 2024
International career
Years	Team	Apps	(Points)
2013	Australia U20	4	
2010	Australia A Schools		

Andrew Ready (born 11 July 1993) is a former rugby union player who most recently played for the Western Force in the Super Rugby competition, playing as a hooker.

== Early life ==
Ready was born in Brisbane, and attended St Joseph's College, Gregory Terrace. He was selected for the Australian Schoolboys rugby team in 2010.

== Career ==
Ready played premier rugby for Easts Tigers and was a member of the club's premiership winning team in 2013. He was selected for the Australia U20 team in 2013.

In 2014, Ready played for Brisbane City in the inaugural National Rugby Championship.

Ready was selected on the bench for the Reds' match against the Highlanders in 2014, but wasn't used as a replacement player in the game. He made his Super Rugby debut against the Hurricanes in April 2015.
