= Michael Snowden =

Australian rugby union player (born 1987)

Mick Snowden
- Born: Michael John Snowden; 18 December 1987 (age 38) Tamworth, New South Wales, Australia
- Height: 1.84 m (6 ft 1/2 in)
- Weight: 91 kg (14 st 5 lb)

Rugby union career
- Position: Scrum-Half
Senior career
Years	Team	Apps	(Points)
2014	NSW Country Eagles	7	(5)
2016	Melbourne Rising	6	(14)
2018	NSW Country Eagles	5	(5)
- Correct as of 6 November 2017
Provincial / State sides
Years	Team	Apps	(Points)
2013	Waikato	8	(5)
- Correct as of 21 October 2013
Super Rugby
Years	Team	Apps	(Points)
2013	Force	5	(0)
2016–2017	Rebels	5	(0)
2018	Waratahs	1	(0)
- Correct as of 5 November 2018

Michael Snowden (born 18 December 1987) is an Australian rugby union footballer. His regular playing position is scrum-half. Having previously played club rugby for Eastwood in the Shute Shield, he was named in the Western Force Extended Playing Squad for the 2013 Super Rugby season before playing with Waikato in the 2013 ITM Cup. Mick returned to Super Rugby with the Melbourne Rebels for the 2016 season where he made two appearances from the bench, before re-signing with the club for the 2017 season.

After roughly 10 months hiatus from Rugby, Snowden was signed by the NSW Waratahs after impressing in a trial. He made a winning debut on the 20 of March 2018 against his former side Melbourne Rebels. A fitting reward as he was frustrated by a lack of first team chances at Rebels in 2017. At 30 years old it was also the first time Snowden's father had seen him play Super Rugby.

== Super Rugby statistics ==
As of 26 July 2016

Season	Team	Apps	Start	Sub	Mins	T	C	PG	DG	Pts	YC	RC
2013	Force	5	0	5	32	0	0	0	0	0	0	0
2016	Rebels	2	0	2	12	0	0	0	0	0	0	0
2017	Rebels	3	1	2	51	0	0	0	0	0	0	0
2018	Waratahs	1	0	1	21	0	0	0	0	0	0	0
Total		11	1	10	116	0	0	0	0	0	0	0
