= Jordan Smiler =

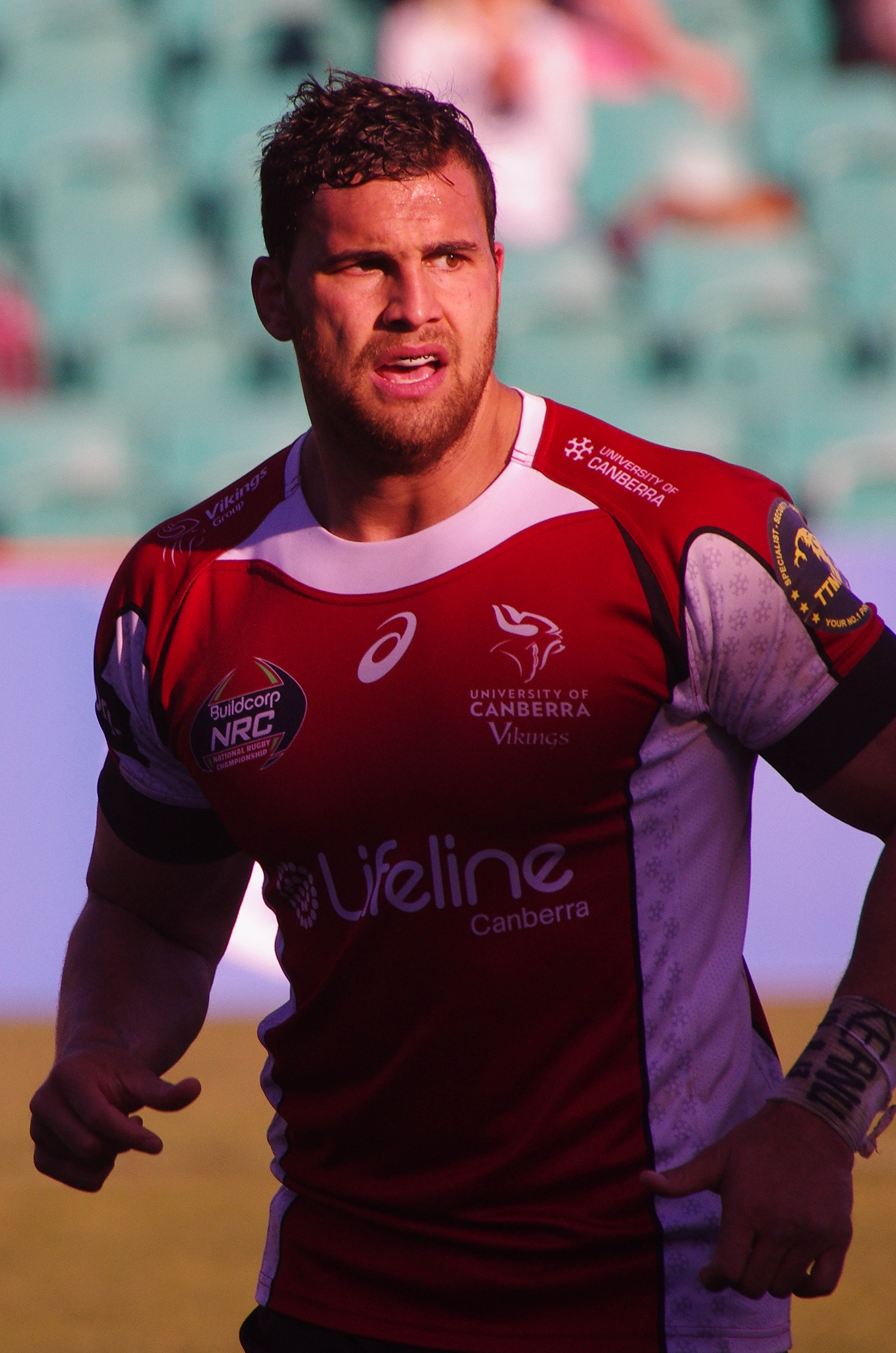
- Born: Jordan Smiler; 19 June 1985 (age 41) Palmerston North, New Zealand
- Height: 1.93 m (6 ft 4 in)
- Weight: 107 kg (16 st 12 lb)
- Occupation: Professional Athlete

Rugby union career
- Position(s): Loose forward, Lock
Senior career
Years	Team	Apps	(Points)
2014–2016	Canberra Vikings	22	(6)
2017–2021	Suntory Sungoliath	31	(55)
2021–2022	Toyota Industries Shuttles	5	(5)
- Correct as of 15 June 2021
Provincial / State sides
Years	Team	Apps	(Points)
2008–09	Waikato	2	(0)
- Correct as of 15 June 2021
Super Rugby
Years	Team	Apps	(Points)
2013–2017	Brumbies	58	(10)
- Correct as of 15 June 2021
International career
Years	Team	Apps	(Points)
-2010	New Zealand 7s		
2011	Australia 7s		

Jordan Smiler (born 19 June 1985) is a New Zealand rugby union player who plays as a loose forward.

Smiler was born in Palmerston North, New Zealand. He played sevens for the New Zealand and captained the Australian Sevens in 2011.

Between 2008 and 2009, Smiler made 20 appearances for Waikato in the ITM Cup.

Smiler played for Sydney's Northern Suburbs in the Shute Shield then joined the Brumbies Extended Playing Squad for the 2013 Super Rugby season.

== Super Rugby Statistics ==
As of 22 July 2016

Season	Team	Games	Starts	Sub	Mins	Tries	Cons	Pens	Drops	Points	Yel	Red
2013	Brumbies	3	1	2	62	0	0	0	0	0	0	0
2014	Brumbies	11	7	4	468	0	0	0	0	0	0	0
2015	Brumbies	18	2	16	552	1	0	0	0	5	1	0
2016	Brumbies	12	3	9	428	0	0	0	0	0	0	0
Total		44	13	31	1510	1	0	0	0	5	1	0
