= Sean Doyle =

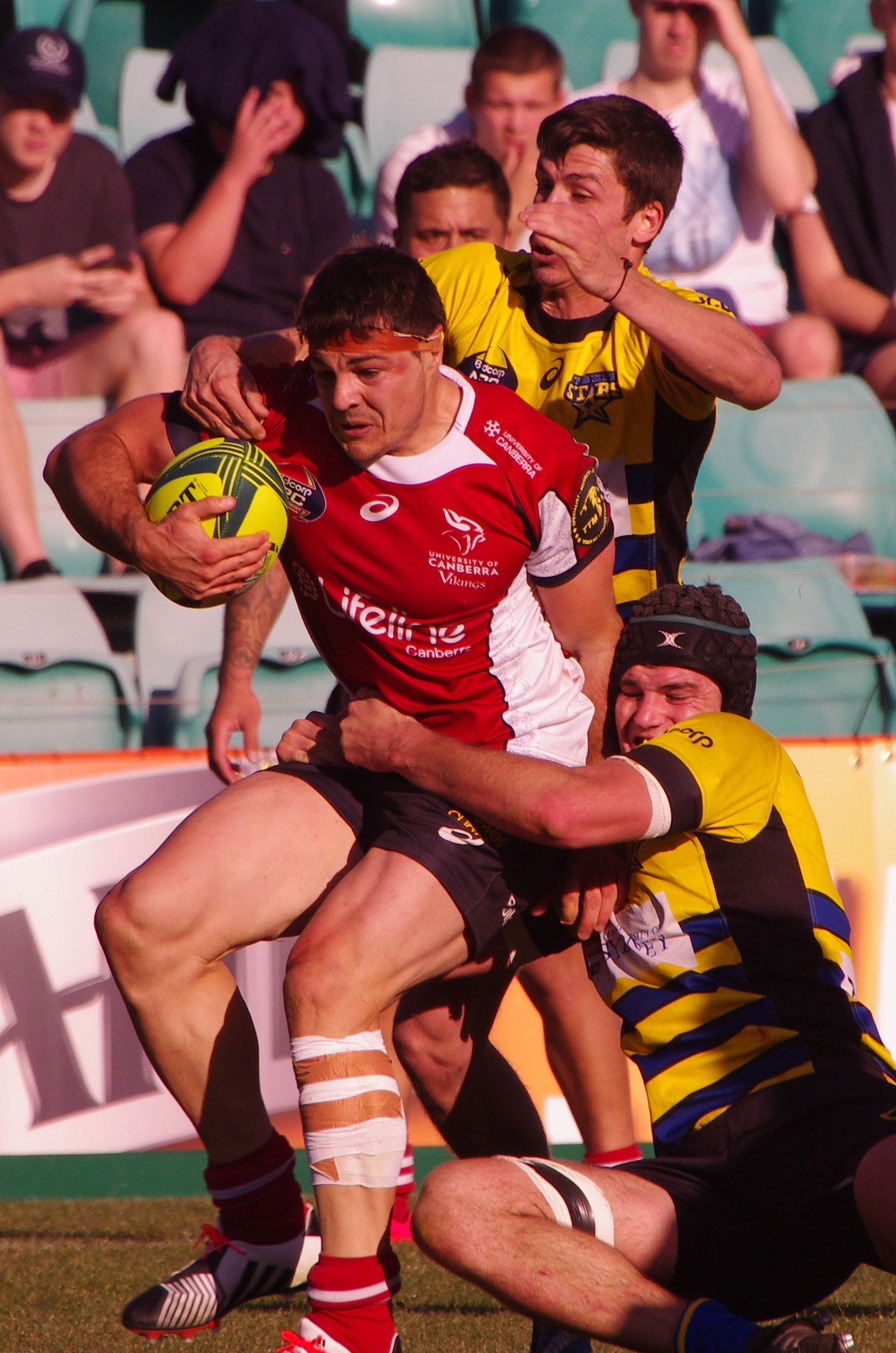
- Doyle, in red, playing for the Canberra Vikings in 2014
- Born: 29 June 1989 (age 37) Sydney, Australia
- Height: 1.84 m (6 ft 0 in)
- Weight: 99 kg (15 st 8 lb; 218 lb)

Rugby union career
- Position: Flanker
- Current team: Munster
Senior career
Years	Team	Apps	(Points)
2012–14	Ulster	24	(10)
2014–	Canberra Vikings	5	(5)
2015–	Brumbies	1	(0)
2015–	Munster	0	(0)
- Correct as of 29 October 2015

Sean Doyle is an Australian professional rugby union player whose favoured position is flanker.

== Career ==
Doyle started his career playing for Sydney-based Shute Shield side Southern Districts.

In 2012, he moved to Belfast, where he spent two seasons at Pro12 side Ulster Rugby. Despite breaking his leg shortly after his arrival, causing him to miss most of the 2012–13 season, he became an important players for them during the 2013–14 season.

He moved back to Australia to join Canberra-based side the Brumbies for the 2015 Super Rugby season.

In October 2015, it was announced that Doyle has joined Irish Pro12 side Munster on a three-month contract, his second stint in Ireland after making 24 appearances for Ulster between 2012 and 2014.
