= Curtis Browning =

Australian rugby union footballer (born 1993)

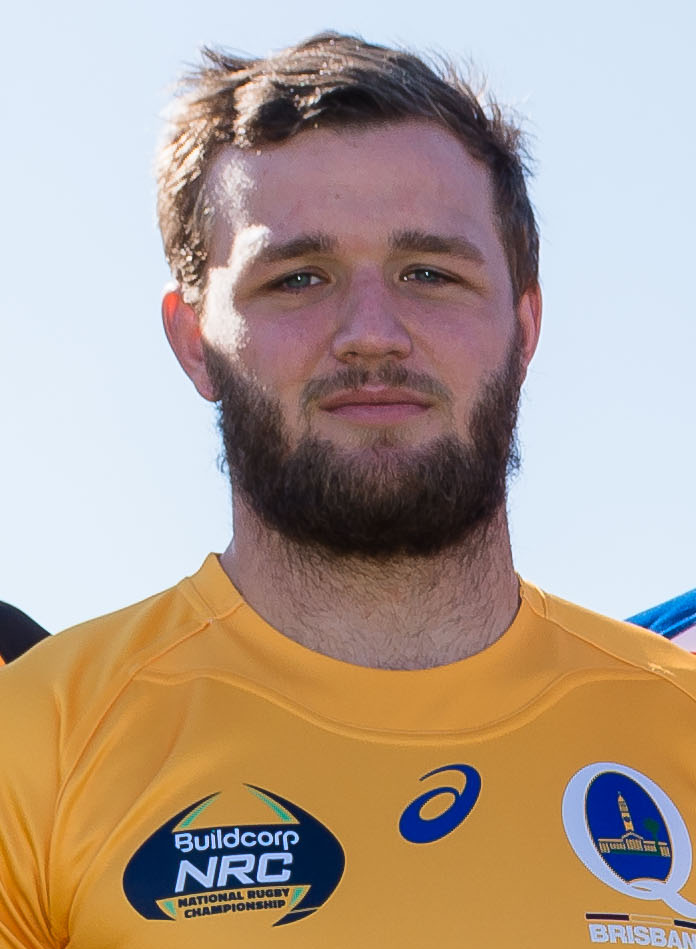
- Browning at the launch of the 2014 NRC
- Born: Curtis Browning; 30 October 1993 (age 33) Brisbane, Queensland, Australia
- Height: 1.90 m (6 ft 3 in)
- Weight: 110 kg (17 st 5 lb; 243 lb)
- School: Brisbane State High School

Rugby union career
- Position: Loose forward
Senior career
Years	Team	Apps	(Points)
2014−15	Brisbane City	6	(10)
2016−17	Lyon	12	(15)
2017–2018	Oyonnax	19	(10)
2018–.	Colomiers	19	(5)
- Correct as of 7 April 2020
Super Rugby
Years	Team	Apps	(Points)
2013–16	Reds	35	(20)
- Correct as of 21 July 2016
International career
Years	Team	Apps	(Points)
2012–13	Australia U-20	9	(10)
2009–11	Australian Schools	10	
- Correct as of 30 September 2013

Curtis Browning (born 30 October 1993) is an Australian professional rugby union footballer. He currently plays in the French Pro D2 competition but started his professional career with the Queensland Reds in Super Rugby. His usual position is loose forward.

== Early life ==
Browning was born in Brisbane, Australia. His grandfather, Dick Marks, was a 1960s Wallaby centre and National Director of Coaching. He attended Brisbane State High School where he was school captain and was selected for the Australian Schoolboys rugby team for three years in a row from 2009 to 2011.

== Rugby career ==
Browning played for University of Queensland in their Queensland Premier Rugby Hospital Cup victory in 2012. He was selected for the Australian U-20 team to play in the IRB Junior World Championships in 2012 and 2013, captaining the team in 2013.

At the annual John Eales Medal awards, he was named the Australian Under-20s Player of the Year for two years in a row in 2012 and 2013. In 2013, Browning joined the Queensland Reds College Squad and made his Super Rugby debut from the bench against the Bulls in March of that year. He signed a two-year main squad contract with the Reds in May 2013.

== Super Rugby statistics ==
As of 27 July 2016

Season	Team	Games	Starts	Sub	Min	T	C	PG	DG	Pts	YC	RC
2013	Reds	1	0	1	29	0	0	0	0	0	0	0
2014	Reds	10	6	4	492	1	0	0	0	5	0	0
2015	Reds	9	4	5	296	0	0	0	0	0	0	0
2016	Reds	15	10	5	866	3	0	0	0	15	0	0
Total		35	20	15	1683	4	0	0	0	20	0	0
