= Auvasa Faleali'i =

New Zealand-born Samoan rugby union player (born 1990)

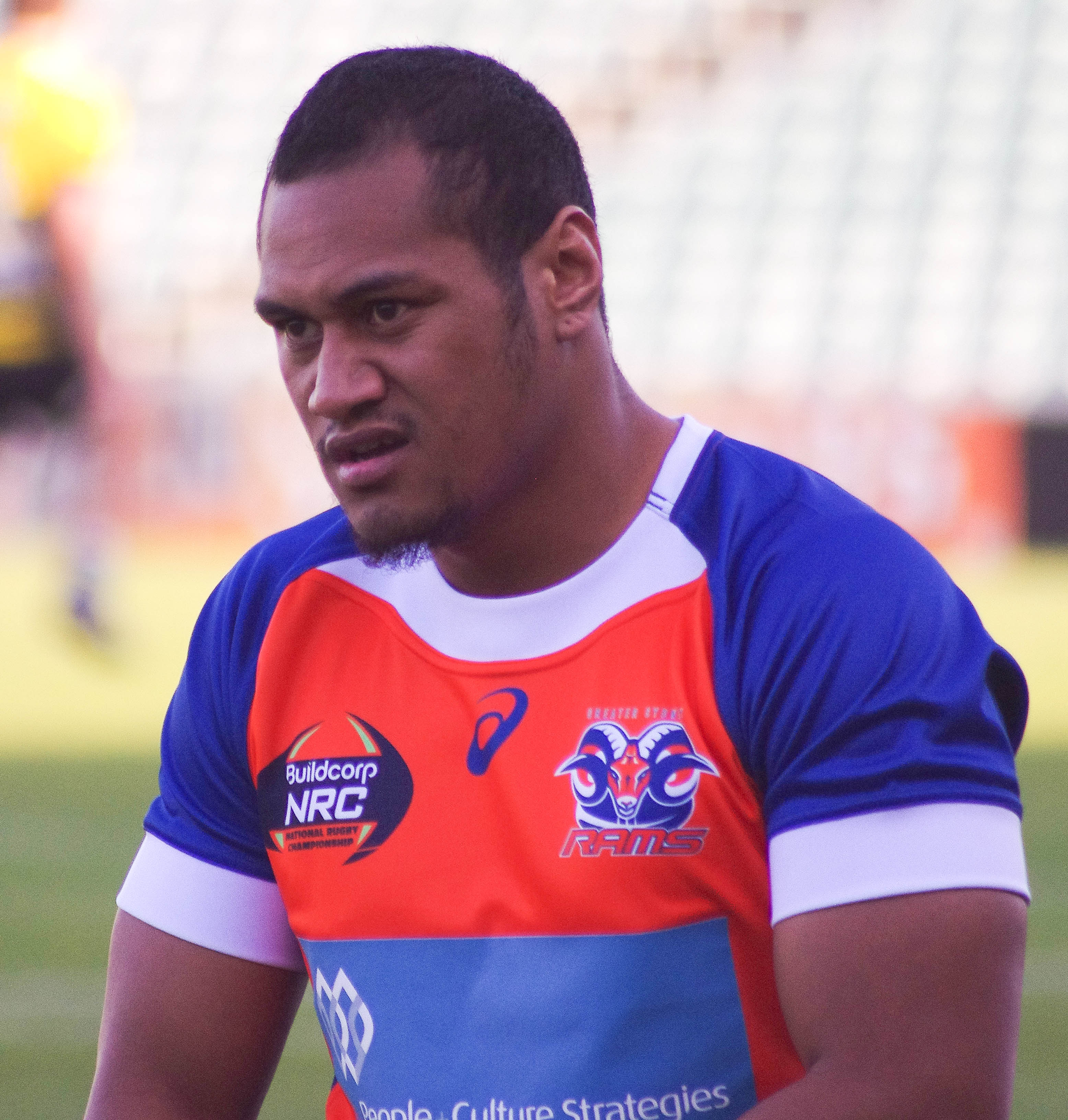
- Born: 9 February 1990 (age 36) Auckland, New Zealand
- Height: 5 ft 11 in (180 cm)
- Weight: 198 lb (90 kg)
- School: De La Salle College

Rugby union career
- Position: Scrum-half
Provincial / State sides
Years	Team	Apps	(Points)
2009–12	Auckland	17	(10)
International career
Years	Team	Apps	(Points)
2017–	Samoa	6	(0)

Auvasa Faleali'i (born 9 February 1990) is a New Zealand-born Samoan rugby union player.

== Biography ==
Raised in Auckland, Faleali'i is the youngest of five brothers and was educated at De La Salle College, where he co-captained the first XV. He competed in the NPC with Auckland and was their "rookie of the year" in 2009.

Faleali'i, a scrum-half, has played with the Greater Sydney Rams, Randwick and Waratahs (Newcastle) in Australia. He was selected to the New South Wales Barbarians squad in 2013 for a tour of Argentina.

In 2015, Faleali'i was signed by French club USO Nevers.

Faleali'i debuted for Samoa at the 2017 World Rugby Pacific Nations Cup.
