= Ammon Matuauto =

- Born: 29 January 1986 (age 40) Wellington, New Zealand
- Height: 1.79 m (5 ft 10 in)
- Weight: 96 kg (15 st 2 lb; 212 lb)

Rugby union career
- Position: Centre
- Current team: Force / Perth Spirit
Senior career
Years	Team	Apps	(Points)
2009	Tasman		
2014–	Perth Spirit	10	(28)
2016−	Force	1	(0)
- Correct as of 14 August 2016

Ammon Matuauto (born 29 January 1986) is a New Zealand rugby union footballer who currently plays as a centre for the Western Force in the international Super Rugby competition. Domestically he represents Perth Spirit in the Australian National Rugby Championship. He has previously played professionally in his homeland for South Island Māori in 2008 and the Tasman Makos in 2009.

== Super Rugby statistics ==
As of 14 August 2016

Season	Team	Games	Starts	Sub	Mins	Tries	Cons	Pens	Drops	Points	Yel	Red
2016	Force	1	1	0	55	0	0	0	0	0	0	0
Total		1	1	0	55	0	0	0	0	0	0	0
