= Junior Rasolea =

- Born: Solomoni Rasolea; 29 April 1991 (age 35) Brisbane, Queensland, Australia
- Height: 1.84 m (6 ft 1/2 in)
- Weight: 102 kg (16 st 1 lb)

Rugby union career
- Position: Centre/Wing
Senior career
Years	Team	Apps	(Points)
2014–2016	Perth Spirit	8	(25)
2016–2018	Edinburgh	26	(30)
2018–	Grenoble	10	(5)
- Correct as of 29 March 2019
Super Rugby
Years	Team	Apps	(Points)
2013–2016	Western Force	38	(10)
- Correct as of 20 July 2016
International career
Years	Team	Apps	(Points)
2011–2012	Australia 7s	2	(13)
- Correct as of 22 October 2012

Solomoni 'Junior' Rasolea (born 29 April 1991) is an Australian rugby union footballer. His regular playing position is centre. He currently plays for French outfit Grenoble. He is a former Australia sevens international.

Rasolea was educated at the Anglican Church Grammar School in Brisbane the same high school as Wallaby flanker David Pocock and flyhalf Quade Cooper.

Rasolea played in the centres for Fiji during his second IRB Junior World Championship in 2011, and also for the Queensland Under 16s (2007), the Queensland Schoolboys (2008–09) and the University club in Brisbane.

In March 2016, he joined Pro14 side Edinburgh. On 8 March 2018, Rasolea would join with French club Grenoble in the Pro D2 from the 2018–19 season.

== Super Rugby statistics ==
As of 20 July 2016

Season	Team	Games	Starts	Sub	Mins	Tries	Cons	Pens	Drops	Points	Yel	Red
2013	Force	12	7	5	613	1	0	0	0	5	0	0
2014	Force	9	8	1	593	1	0	0	0	5	0	0
2015	Force	7	6	1	434	0	0	0	0	0	0	0
2016	Force	11	10	1	774	0	0	0	0	0	0	0
Total		39	31	8	2414	2	0	0	0	10	0	0
