= Tala Gray =

Australian rugby union player

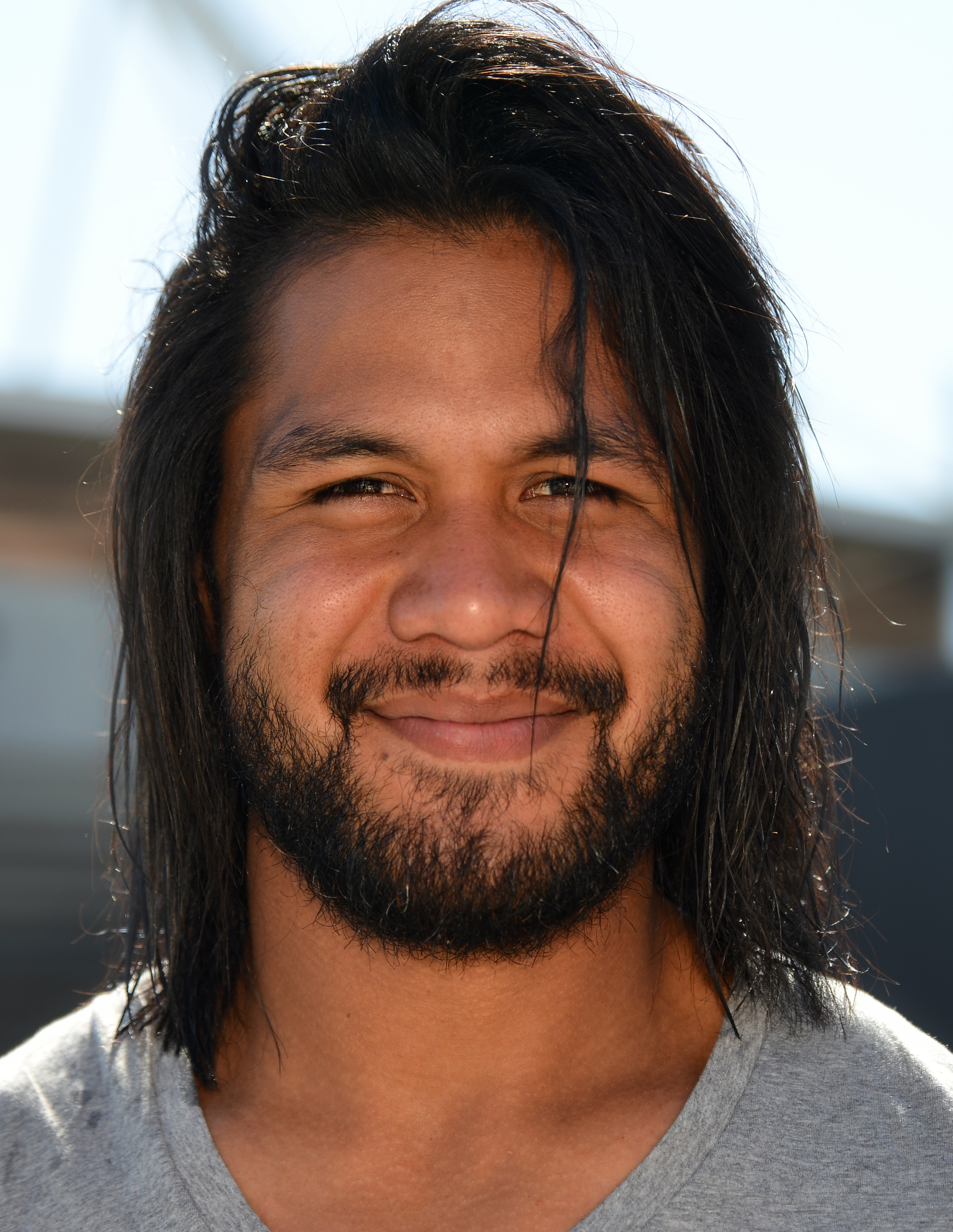
- Full name: Talalelei Gray
- Born: 28 February 1990 (age 36) Melbourne, Australia
- Height: 1.94 m (6 ft 4 in)
- Weight: 114 kg (17 st 13 lb; 251 lb)

Rugby union career
- Position: Loose forward
- Current team: Waratahs
Amateur team(s)
Years	Team	Apps	(Points)
2012-15	Eastern Suburbs	23	(15)
Senior career
Years	Team	Apps	(Points)
2011–13	Biarritz Olympique	28	(0)
2014	CS Bourgoin-Jallieu	2	(0)
2014	NSW Country Eagles	9	(20)
2015-18	Toulouse	61	(20)
2018-2022	Stade Français Paris	29	(10)
2022-2024	FC Grenoble Rugby		
2024-2026	CS Bourgoin-Jallieu		
- Correct as of 22 June 2026
International career
Years	Team	Apps	(Points)
2010	Australia U20		

Talalelei Gray (born 28 February 1990) is an Australian Rugby Union player who currently plays as a loose forward for the Stade Français Paris (France) in Top 14 after two games for Waratahs in Super Rugby.

== Career ==
Gray was a member of both the Brumbies and Waratahs academies and played 2 seasons of Shute Shield rugby for Easts before heading to France to join Top 14 side Biarritz in 2011. There he was a winner of the Amlin Challenge Cup and his performances caught the eye of his future coach Michael Cheika who signed him up for Waratahs ahead of the 2014 Super Rugby season.

== International ==
Gray was a member of the Australia Under 20 side that competed in the 2010 IRB Junior World Championship and has also represented the Australia Sevens team.
