= Rory Walton =

- Born: Rory Walton; 11 April 1989 (age 37) Canberra, Australian Capital Territory, Australia
- Height: 1.95 m (6 ft 5 in)
- Weight: 119 kg (18 st 10 lb)

Rugby union career
- Position: Lock
- Current team: Northern Suburbs
Senior career
Years	Team	Apps	(Points)
2014–15	Perth Spirit	10	(0)
2016–	Carcassonne	36	(0)
- Correct as of 15 March 2016
Super Rugby
Years	Team	Apps	(Points)
2013–16	Force	23	(0)
- Correct as of 20 July 2016

Rory Walton (born 11 April 1989) is an Australian rugby union footballer. His regular playing position is lock. In 2010 Walton joined the ACT Brumbies as a part of their extended playing squad, staying until 2012. Having previously played club rugby for Northern Suburbs in the Shute Shield, he was named in the Western Force Playing Squad for the 2013 and 2014 Super Rugby seasons. Walton later signed a two-year contract to play both 2015 and 2016 seasons with The Western Force.

In March 2016, French Pro D2 side Carcassonne announced that they signed Walton prior to the 2016–17 season on a two-year contract.

In 2019 Walton announced his retirement from professional rugby after 9 years to pursue other opportunities.

== Super Rugby statistics ==
As of 20 July 2016

Season	Team	Games	Starts	Sub	Mins	Tries	Cons	Pens	Drops	Points	Yel	Red
2013	Force	8	1	7	135	0	0	0	0	0	0	0
2014	Force	5	0	5	0	0	0	0	0	0	0	0
2015	Force	1	0	1	19	0	0	0	0	0	0	0
2016	Force	7	4	3	178	0	0	0	0	0	0	0
Total		21	5	16	332	0	0	0	0	0	0	0
