= Heath Tessmann =

- Born: Heath Tessmann; 3 March 1984 (age 42) Ayr, Queensland, Australia
- Height: 1.82 m (5 ft 11 1/2 in)
- Weight: 105 kg (16 st 7 lb)

Rugby union career
- Position: Hooker
- Current team: University of Queensland
Senior career
Years	Team	Apps	(Points)
2014−	Perth Spirit	7	(15)
- Correct as of 4 November 2015
Super Rugby
Years	Team	Apps	(Points)
2011–12	Rebels	10	(0)
2013–	Force	51	(5)
- Correct as of 20 July 2016

Heath Tessmann (born 3 March 1984 in Ayr, Australia) is a rugby union footballer. His regular playing position is hooker. He represented the Rebels in Super Rugby, making his franchise debut in Week 1 of the 2011 Super Rugby season and continuing into the 2012 season.

He signed a short-term contract with the Western Force ahead of the 2013 Super Rugby season in order to provide injury cover for the franchise.

== Super Rugby statistics ==
As of 25 July 2016

Season	Team	Games	Starts	Sub	Mins	Tries	Cons	Pens	Drops	Points	Yel	Red
2011	Rebels	10	0	10	128	0	0	0	0	0	0	0
2012	Rebels	0	0	0	0	0	0	0	0	0	0	0
2013	Force	13	10	3	857	0	0	0	0	0	0	0
2014	Force	15	0	15	173	0	0	0	0	0	0	0
2015	Force	14	0	14	307	1	0	0	0	5	0	0
2016	Force	9	5	4	382	0	3	0	0	0	0	0
Total		61	15	46	1847	1	0	0	0	5	0	0
