= Australian Schoolboys rugby union team =

(Australia) Australian Schoolboys & U18
- Union: Australian Schools Rugby Union
- Founded: 1969 (affiliate member of ARU)
Team kit

Official website
- www.schoolsrugby.com.au

The Australian Schoolboys & U18 rugby union team is the national team for schoolboy rugby union & U18 players in Australia. Considered to be the pinnacle of schoolboy & U18 rugby in Australia, the team plays in fixtures against other national representative schoolboy teams from around the world. Many players who have played in the Australian Schoolboys team have gone on to further representative careers with Super Rugby franchise teams and the Australian national rugby union team.

== Australian Schools Rugby Championships ==
The Australian Schools Rugby Championships, held to determine the champion state and to select the Australian Schools Rugby team, have taken place every year since 1973. Under the current format, the championships are played in two divisions.

Division I Championships (from 2005 onwards)
Year	Winner	Runner-up	Location
2005	NSW I	QLD I	Canberra
2006	QLD II	NSW II	Sydney
2007	QLD I	NSW II	Canberra
2008	QLD I	NSW I	Canberra
2009	QLD I	Comb. States	Sydney
2010	QLD II	NSW II	Brisbane
2011	QLD I	NSW I	Brisbane
2012	NSW I	QLD I	Sydney
2013	NSW I	NSW II	Sydney
2014	NSW I	NSW II	Sydney
2015	NSW I	QLD I	Sydney
2016	NSW II	NSW I	Sydney
2017	ACT	QLD II	Sydney
2018	NSW I	NSW II	Sydney

=== Division I ===
The Division I Championship is contested by 8 teams:

- QLD I and QLD II
- NSW I and NSW II
- ACT
- VIC
- WA
- Combined States

Each team has a squad of 23 players. The "Combined States" team is composed of players from any state (or territory) not selected for other squads but deemed up to the standard required for Division I. The team winning the Division I Championship is awarded the 'Jika' Travers Shield, while the runner-up receives the 'Weary' Dunlop Plate.

Following the tournament, the Australian Schools Team is selected to represent Australia in 'Test' matches against national Under 18 or schoolboys teams from other countries.

An Australian Schools Barbarians team (previously Australia A Schoolboys prior to 2015) is also chosen. This side was first selected in 1995 and also plays schoolboys teams from other countries, but these matches (usually on Australian soil against incoming teams) are not counted as Australian Schools 'Test' matches.

=== Division II ===
Division II Championships (from 2012 to 2016)
Year	Winner	Runner-up	Location
2012	SA	LMRDT	Sydney
2013	LMRDT	SA	Sydney
2014	LMRDT	SA	Sydney
2015	SA	NT	Sydney
2016	NT	LMRDT	Sydney
2017–present: Subsumed within the Gold Coast Rugby Carnival

The Australian Schools Rugby Union previously held a Division II tournament alongside the main Division I Championship until 2016.

Teams that competed included representative sides from the Northern Territory, South Australia, and Tasmania, but these match-ups were moved to the Gold Coast Rugby Carnival from 2017.

First held in 1979, the Div II competition originally included the state teams from Victoria and Western Australia before those sides moved to Division I in 2010.

There was also a National Indigenous team brought together by the Lloyd McDermott Rugby Development Team, the LMRDT, that competed in Div II from 2002 to 2016.

For the 2014 tournament, Tasmania was replaced by a Victoria II side in the Division II Championship, but Tasmania returned in 2015.

The team winning the Division II Championship was awarded the Charles Blunt Cup, and the runner-up received the Merv Allen Plate. From 2012 to 2016, a President's XV Team was selected from the Division II players for matches against visiting national schools teams.

== Most appearances ==
Players with nine or more caps:

Player	Caps	School	Years
Chris Feauai-Sautia	11	Brisbane State High School, Queensland	2009–2010
Hugh Roach	11	Newington College, New South Wales	2008–2010
Curtis Browning	10	Brisbane State High School, Queensland	2008–2011
Andrew Barrett	9	Illawarra Sports High School, New South Wales	2005–2006
Kurtley Beale	9	St Joseph's College, New South Wales	2005–2006
Lolo Fakaosilea	9	Brisbane Boys College, Queensland	2012
Jordan Mislov	9	Brisbane Water Secondary College, New South Wales	2012–2013

== See also ==
- Ireland national schoolboy rugby union team
- New Zealand national schoolboy rugby union team
