= List of 2016–17 Super Rugby transfers (Australia) =

This is a list of player movements for Australian Super Rugby teams prior to the end of the 2017 Super Rugby season. Departure and arrivals of all players that were included in a Super Rugby squad for 2016 or 2017 are listed here, regardless of when it occurred. Future-dated transfers are only included if confirmed by the player or his agent, his former team or his new team.

Teams usually name their squads for 2017 – typically containing around 35–40 players – in late 2016 or early 2017. In addition to the main squad, teams can also name additional players that train in backup or development squads for the franchises. These players are denoted by (wider training group) for New Zealand teams, or (extended playing squad) for Australian teams.

== Notes ==
- 2016 players listed are all players that were named in the initial senior squad, or subsequently included in a 23-man match day squad at any game during the season.
- (did not play) denotes that a player did not play at all during one of the two seasons due to injury or non-selection. These players are included to indicate they were contracted to the team.
- (short-term) denotes that a player wasn't initially contracted, but came in during the season. This could either be a club rugby player coming in as injury cover, or a player whose contract had expired at another team (typically in the northern hemisphere).
- Flags are only shown for players moving to or from another country.
- Players may play in several positions, but are listed in only one.

== Transfers ==
=== Brumbies ===
Brumbies transfers 2016–17
Pos	2016 squad	Out	In	2017 squad
PR	Allan Alaalatoa; Ben Alexander; Albert Anae (did not play); Leslie Leulua’iali’i-Makin; Scott Sio; Ruan Smith	(substituted off) Albert Anae (to (Japan) Mitsubishi Sagamihara DynaBoars); (substituted off) Ruan Smith (to (Japan) Toyota Verblitz)	(substituted on) Nic Mayhew (from (New Zealand) Blues); (substituted on) Faalelei Sione (from University of Canberra Vikings)	Allan Alaalatoa; Ben Alexander; Leslie Leulua’iali’i-Makin; Nic Mayhew; Scott Sio; Faalelei Sione (extended playing squad)
HK	Robbie Abel (extended playing squad); Joshua Mann-Rea; Stephen Moore	(substituted off) Stephen Moore (to Reds)	(substituted on) Saia Fainga'a (from Reds)	Robbie Abel; Saia Fainga'a; Joshua Mann-Rea
LK	Rory Arnold; Sam Carter; Blake Enever; Tom Staniforth			Rory Arnold; Sam Carter; Blake Enever; Tom Staniforth
FL	Scott Fardy; David Pocock; Jordan Smiler; Michael Wells (extended playing squad)	(substituted off) David Pocock (sabbatical); (substituted off) Michael Wells (to Waratahs)	(substituted on) Chris Alcock (from Force); (substituted on) Tom Cusack (from Australia Sevens); (substituted on) Rob Valetini (from Melbourne Harlequins)	Chris Alcock; Tom Cusack; Scott Fardy; Jordan Smiler; Rob Valetini (did not play)
N8	Jarrad Butler; Ben Hyne (short-term); Ita Vaea	(substituted off) Ita Vaea (retired)	(substituted on) Lolo Fakaosilea (from Reds)	Jarrad Butler; Lolo Fakaosilea; Ben Hyne (extended playing squad)
SH	Tomás Cubelli; Michael Dowsett; Joe Powell (extended playing squad)	(substituted off) Michael Dowsett (to (New Zealand) Southland)	(substituted on) Ryan Lonergan (from Tuggeranong Vikings); (substituted on) De Wet Roos (from Sydney Rays)	Tomás Cubelli; Ryan Lonergan; Joe Powell; De Wet Roos (short-term)
FH	Nick Jooste (did not play); Christian Lealiifano		(substituted on) Wharenui Hawera (from (New Zealand) Southland); (substituted on) Isaac Thompson (from Canberra Vikings)	Wharenui Hawera; Nick Jooste (did not play); Christian Lealiifano; Isaac Thompson (supplementary player)
CE	Jordan Jackson-Hope (development squad); Tevita Kuridrani; Andrew Smith; Matt To'omua	(substituted off) Matt To'omua (to (England) Leicester Tigers)	(substituted on) Anthony Fainga'a (from Reds); (substituted on) Kyle Godwin (from Force)	Anthony Fainga'a (did not play); Kyle Godwin; Jordan Jackson-Hope (extended playing squad); Tevita Kuridrani; Andrew Smith
WG	Nigel Ah Wong; Robbie Coleman; James Dargaville; Henry Speight; Lausii Taliauli; Joe Tomane	(substituted off) Robbie Coleman (to Force); (substituted off) Joe Tomane (to (France) Montpellier)	(substituted on) Andy Muirhead (from Force)	Nigel Ah Wong; James Dargaville; Andy Muirhead (short-term); Henry Speight; Lausii Taliauli (did not play)
FB	Aidan Toua		(substituted on) Tom Banks (from Reds)	Tom Banks; Aidan Toua
Coach	Stephen Larkham			Stephen Larkham

=== Force ===
Force transfers 2016–17
Pos	2016 squad	Out	In	2017 squad
PR	Jermaine Ainsley (wider training squad); Pekahou Cowan; Tetera Faulkner; Chris Heiberg; Ollie Hoskins (did not play); Guy Millar (extended playing squad); Francois van Wyk	(substituted off) Chris Heiberg (to (South Africa) Southern Kings); (substituted off) Ollie Hoskins (to (England) London Irish); (substituted off) Guy Millar (to (New Zealand) Highlanders)	(substituted on) Ben Daley (from Reds); (substituted on) Shambeckler Vui (from Perth Spirit)	Jermaine Ainsley; Pekahou Cowan; Ben Daley; Tetera Faulkner; Francois van Wyk; Shambeckler Vui
HK	Nathan Charles; Anaru Rangi (short-term); Harry Scoble (wider training group); Tom Sexton (extended playing squad, did not play); Heath Tessmann	(substituted off) Nathan Charles (to (France) Clermont); (substituted off) Tom Sexton (released)	(substituted on) Tatafu Polota-Nau (from Waratahs)	Tatafu Polota-Nau; Anaru Rangi; Harry Scoble (did not play); Heath Tessmann
LK	Adam Coleman; Steve Mafi; Matt Philip (short-term); Rory Walton	(substituted off) Steve Mafi (to (France) Castres); (substituted off) Rory Walton (to (France) Carcassonne)	(substituted on) Richie Arnold (from development squad); (substituted on) Lewis Carmichael (from (Scotland) Edinburgh); (substituted on) Onehunga Havili (from development squad); (substituted on) Ben Matwijow (from Reds)	Richie Arnold; Lewis Carmichael (short-term); Adam Coleman; Onehunga Havili (development squad); Ben Matwijow (did not play); Matt Philip
FL	Chris Alcock; Angus Cottrell; Richard Hardwick (wider training group); Ross Haylett-Petty; Matt Hodgson; Kane Koteka (extended playing squad); Brynard Stander	(substituted off) Chris Alcock (to Brumbies)		Angus Cottrell (did not play); Richard Hardwick; Ross Haylett-Petty; Matt Hodgson; Kane Koteka; Brynard Stander
N8	Ben McCalman		(substituted on) Isi Naisarani (from Brisbane City)	Ben McCalman; Isi Naisarani
SH	Ryan Louwrens; Alby Mathewson; Ian Prior	(substituted off) Alby Mathewson (to (New Zealand) Canterbury)	(substituted on) Michael Ruru (from Perth Spirit); (substituted on) Mitch Short (from NSW Country Eagles)	Ryan Louwrens; Ian Prior; Michael Ruru; Mitch Short (short-term)
FH	Kyle Godwin; Peter Grant; Jono Lance	(substituted off) Kyle Godwin (to Brumbies)		Peter Grant; Jono Lance
CE	Luke Burton; Ammon Matuauto (extended playing squad); Junior Rasolea; Ben Tapuai	(substituted off) Ammon Matuauto (released); (substituted off) Junior Rasolea (to (Scotland) Edinburgh); (substituted off) Ben Tapuai (to (England) Bath)	(substituted on) Bill Meakes (from (England) Gloucester); (substituted on) Chance Peni (from Wests Tigers)	Luke Burton; Bill Meakes; Chance Peni
WG	Marcel Brache; Brad Lacey (extended playing squad, did not play); Semisi Masirewa; Luke Morahan; Albert Nikoro	(substituted off) Brad Lacey (released); (substituted off) Albert Nikoro (released)	(substituted on) Robbie Coleman (from Brumbies); (substituted on) Curtis Rona (from Canterbury-Bankstown Bulldogs); (substituted on) James Verity-Amm (from Perth Spirit)	Marcel Brache; Robbie Coleman; Semisi Masirewa; Luke Morahan; Curtis Rona; James Verity-Amm
FB	Dane Haylett-Petty		(substituted on) Alex Newsome (from NSW Country Eagles)	Dane Haylett-Petty; Alex Newsome
Coach	Michael Foley; David Wessels (caretaker)	(substituted off) Michael Foley (released)		David Wessels

=== Rebels ===
Rebels transfers 2016–17
Pos	2016 squad	Out	In	2017 squad
PR	Cruze Ah-Nau; Ryan Cocker (did not play); Jamie Hagan; Tim Metcher; Tom Moloney (development squad); Toby Smith; Laurie Weeks	(substituted off) Ryan Cocker (to (New Zealand) Taranaki); (substituted off) Jamie Hagan (to (France) Béziers)	(substituted on) Tyrel Lomax (from Brumbies development squad); (substituted on) Fereti Sa'aga (from Melbourne Rising)	Cruze Ah-Nau; Tyrel Lomax; Tim Metcher (did not play); Tom Moloney; Fereti Sa'aga (development squad); Toby Smith; Laurie Weeks
HK	James Hanson; Patrick Leafa; Siliva Siliva		(substituted on) Jordan Uelese (from Melbourne University)	James Hanson; Patrick Leafa; Siliva Siliva; Jordan Uelese
LK	Steve Cummins; Sam Jeffries; Luke Jones; Culum Retallick	(substituted off) Luke Jones (to (France) Bordeaux)	(substituted on) Dominic Day (from (Japan) Toyota Verblitz); (substituted on) Murray Douglas (from Melbourne Rising); (substituted on) Esei Ha'angana (from Rebels U20); (substituted on) Alex Toolis (from (Scotland) Edinburgh)	Steve Cummins; Dominic Day; Murray Douglas (short-term); Esei Ha'angana (development squad); Sam Jeffries (did not play); Culum Retallick; Alex Toolis (did not play)
FL	Colby Fainga'a; Harley Fox (extended playing squad, did not play); Scott Fuglistaller; Rob Leota (supplementary player); Sean McMahon; Jordy Reid; Adam Thomson	(substituted off) Scott Fuglistaller (to (Japan) Toyota Industries Shuttles); (substituted off) Adam Thomson (to (Japan) Canon Eagles)	(substituted on) Will Miller (from Sydney Rays); (substituted on) Jake Schatz (from Reds); (substituted on) Hugh Sinclair (from Sydney Rays)	Colby Fainga'a; Harley Fox (did not play); Rob Leota (did not play); Sean McMahon; Will Miller (short-term); Jordy Reid; Jake Schatz; Hugh Sinclair (short-term)
N8	Lopeti Timani		(substituted on) Amanaki Mafi (from (Japan) NTT Communications Shining Arcs)	Amanaki Mafi; Lopeti Timani
SH	Ben Meehan; Michael Snowden (extended playing squad); Nic Stirzaker		(substituted on) Harrison Goddard (from Western Sydney Rams)	Harrison Goddard (development squad); Ben Meehan; Michael Snowden; Nic Stirzaker
FH	Jack Debreczeni; Daniel Hawkins (extended playing squad)	(substituted off) Daniel Hawkins (to (New Zealand) Northland)	(substituted on) Jackson Garden-Bachop (from (New Zealand) Wellington); (substituted on) Jack McGregor (from Gordon); (substituted on) Ben Volavola (from (New Zealand) Crusaders)	Jack Debreczeni; Jackson Garden-Bachop; Jack McGregor (did not play); Ben Volavola
CE	Paul Asquith (extended playing squad); Tamati Ellison; Mike Harris; Reece Hodge; Mitch Inman; Sione Tuipulotu (supplementary player)	(substituted off) Paul Asquith (to Western Sydney Rams); (substituted off) Tamati Ellison (to (Japan) Ricoh Black Rams); (substituted off) Mike Harris (to (France) Lyon)	(substituted on) Dennis Pili-Gaitau (from Sydney Rays); (substituted on) Semisi Tupou (from Rebels U20)	Reece Hodge; Mitch Inman; Dennis Pili-Gaitau (did not play); Sione Tuipulotu (supplementary player); Semisi Tupou (development squad)
WG	Cam Crawford; Tom English; Kotaro Matsushima (short-term); Sefa Naivalu; Dom Shipperley	(substituted off) Cam Crawford (released); (substituted off) Kotaro Matsushima (to (Japan) Sunwolves)	(substituted on) Pama Fou (from Australia Sevens); (substituted on) Kentaro Kodama (from (Japan) Sunwolves); (substituted on) Marika Koroibete (from Melbourne Storm)	Tom English; Pama Fou (did not play); Kentaro Kodama (did not play); Marika Koroibete; Sefa Naivalu; Dom Shipperley (did not play)
FB	Jack Maddocks (short-term, did not play); Jonah Placid			Jack Maddocks; Jonah Placid
Coach	Tony McGahan			Tony McGahan

=== Reds ===
Reds transfers 2016–17
Pos	2016 squad	Out	In	2017 squad
PR	Ben Daley; Sef Fa'agase; Greg Holmes; Pettowa Paraka; James Slipper; Sam Talakai; Taniela Tupou	(substituted off) Ben Daley (to Force); (substituted off) Greg Holmes (to (England) Exeter Chiefs); (substituted off) Pettowa Paraka (not named)	(substituted on) Phil Kite (from (New Zealand) Northland); (substituted on) Kirwan Sanday (from Easts); (substituted on) Markus Vanzati (from Brisbane City)	Sef Fa'agase; Phil Kite (short-term); Kirwan Sanday (short-term); James Slipper; Sam Talakai; Taniela Tupou; Markus Vanzati
HK	Saia Fainga'a; Matt Mafi (short-term); Andrew Ready	(substituted off) Saia Fainga'a (to Brumbies); (substituted off) Matt Mafi (returned to Brisbane City)	(substituted on) Alex Mafi (from Queensland Country); (substituted on) Stephen Moore (from Brumbies)	Alex Mafi; Stephen Moore; Andrew Ready
LK	Kane Douglas; Ben Matwijow; Cadeyrn Neville; Rob Simmons; Lukhan Tui	(substituted off) Ben Matwijow (to Force)	(substituted on) Izack Rodda (from Queensland Country)	Kane Douglas; Cadeyrn Neville; Izack Rodda; Rob Simmons; Lukhan Tui
FL	Curtis Browning; Liam Gill; Michael Gunn; Leroy Houston (short-term); Adam Korczyk (did not play); Waita Setu (short-term); Caleb Timu (short-term, did not play)	(substituted off) Curtis Browning (to (France) Lyon); (substituted off) Liam Gill (to (France) Toulon); (substituted off) Waita Setu (returned to GPS)	(substituted on) Reece Hewat (from Norths); (substituted on) George Smith (from (England) Wasps)	Michael Gunn (did not play); Reece Hewat; Leroy Houston; Adam Korczyk; George Smith; Caleb Timu
N8	Lolo Fakaosilea (did not play); Jake Schatz; Hendrik Tui	(substituted off) Lolo Fakaosilea (to Brumbies); (substituted off) Jake Schatz (to Rebels)	(substituted on) Scott Higginbotham (from (Japan) NEC Green Rockets)	Scott Higginbotham; Hendrik Tui
SH	Nick Frisby; Scott Gale; James Tuttle	(substituted off) Scott Gale (to Western Sydney Rams)	(substituted on) Moses Sorovi (from Brisbane City)	Nick Frisby; Moses Sorovi; James Tuttle
FH	Sam Greene; Jake McIntyre	(substituted off) Sam Greene (to (Japan) Toyota Industries Shuttles)	(substituted on) Quade Cooper (from (France) Toulon); (substituted on) Hamish Stewart (from development squad)	Quade Cooper; Jake McIntyre; Hamish Stewart (development squad)
CE	Anthony Fainga'a; Samu Kerevi; Campbell Magnay; Duncan Paia'aua; Henry Taefu	(substituted off) Anthony Fainga'a (to Brumbies)		Samu Kerevi; Campbell Magnay; Duncan Paia'aua; Henry Taefu (did not play)
WG	Chris Feauai-Sautia; Alex Gibbon (short-term); Chris Kuridrani; Junior Laloifi; Eto Nabuli; Izaia Perese (did not play)	(substituted off) Alex Gibbon (returned to Brisbane City); (substituted off) Junior Laloifi (to Brisbane City)	(substituted on) Lachlan Maranta (from Brisbane Broncos); (substituted on) Jayden Ngamanu (from Souths)	Chris Feauai-Sautia (did not play); Chris Kuridrani; Lachlan Maranta; Eto Nabuli; Jayden Ngamanu; Izaia Perese
FB	Tom Banks (short-term); Ayumu Goromaru; Karmichael Hunt; JJ Taulagi (did not play); Jack Tuttle (short-term)	(substituted off) Tom Banks (to Brumbies); (substituted off) Ayumu Goromaru (to (France) Toulon); (substituted off) JJ Taulagi (to (Japan) Sunwolves); (substituted off) Jack Tuttle (returned to Norths)		Karmichael Hunt
Coach	Richard Graham; Matt O'Connor (interim); Nick Stiles (interim)	(substituted off) Richard Graham (released); (substituted off) Matt O'Connor (released)		Nick Stiles

=== Waratahs ===
Waratahs transfers 2016–17
Pos	2016 squad	Out	In	2017 squad
PR	Cameron Orr (development squad, did not play); Tom Robertson (extended playing squad); Benn Robinson; Paddy Ryan; Matt Sandell (extended playing squad, did not play); Angus Ta'avao; Jeremy Tilse	(substituted off) Cameron Orr (to (England) Gloucester); (substituted off) Benn Robinson (retired); (substituted off) Jeremy Tilse (released)	(substituted on) Sekope Kepu (from (France) Bordeaux); (substituted on) Dave Lolohea (from Western Sydney Rams); (substituted on) Sam Needs (from NSW Country Eagles)	Sekope Kepu; Dave Lolohea (short-term); Sam Needs (supplementary squad, did not play); Tom Robertson; Paddy Ryan; Matt Sandell (did not play); Angus Ta'avao
HK	James Hilterbrand (short-term); Tolu Latu; Tatafu Polota-Nau; Hugh Roach	(substituted off) James Hilterbrand (returned to Sydney Rays); (substituted off) Tatafu Polota-Nau (to Force)	(substituted on) Damien Fitzpatrick (from (France) Lyon)	Damien Fitzpatrick; Tolu Latu; Hugh Roach
LK	Ned Hanigan; Sam Lousi; Ryan McCauley (supplementary squad, did not play); Dean Mumm; Will Skelton; Senio Toleafoa (supplementary squad, did not play)	(substituted off) Sam Lousi (to (New Zealand) Hurricanes)	(substituted on) David McDuling (from (South Africa) Sharks)	Ned Hanigan; Ryan McCauley (extended playing squad); David McDuling; Dean Mumm; Will Skelton; Senio Toleafoa (extended playing squad)
FL	Jack Dempsey; Dave Dennis; Michael Hooper; Brad Wilkin (did not play)	(substituted off) Dave Dennis (to (England) Exeter Chiefs)	(substituted on) Michael Wells (from Brumbies)	Jack Dempsey; Michael Hooper; Michael Wells; Brad Wilkin (did not play)
N8	Jed Holloway; Wycliff Palu	(substituted off) Wycliff Palu (to (Japan) Toyota Verblitz)	(substituted on) Maclean Jones (from Queensland Country)	Jed Holloway; Maclean Jones (short-term)
SH	Jake Gordon (extended playing squad, did not play); Matt Lucas; Nick Phipps			Jake Gordon (extended playing squad); Matt Lucas; Nick Phipps
FH	Andrew Deegan (supplementary squad, did not play); Bernard Foley; Bryce Hegarty		(substituted on) Mack Mason (from Queensland Country)	Andrew Deegan (supplementary squad, did not play); Bernard Foley; Bryce Hegarty; Mack Mason (supplementary squad)
CE	Kurtley Beale; Matthew Carraro; Israel Folau; Rob Horne; David Horwitz; Jim Stewart	(substituted off) Kurtley Beale (to (England) Wasps); (substituted off) Matthew Carraro (released); (substituted off) Jim Stewart (not named)	(substituted on) Irae Simone (from Sydney Rays)	Israel Folau; Rob Horne; David Horwitz; Irae Simone (extended playing squad)
WG	Henry Clunies-Ross (supplementary squad, did not play); Zac Guildford; Andrew Kellaway; Taqele Naiyaravoro (short-term); Reece Robinson	(substituted off) Henry Clunies-Ross (to (France) Lyon); (substituted off) Zac Guildford (released)	(substituted on) Cameron Clark (from Australia Sevens)	Cameron Clark; Andrew Kellaway; Taqele Naiyaravoro; Reece Robinson
FB	Harry Jones (supplementary squad, did not play)			Harry Jones (extended playing squad, did not play)
Coach	Daryl Gibson			Daryl Gibson

== See also ==
- List of 2016–17 Premiership Rugby transfers
- List of 2016–17 Pro12 transfers
- List of 2016–17 Top 14 transfers
- List of 2016–17 RFU Championship transfers
- SANZAAR
- Super Rugby franchise areas
