= List of 2017–18 Super Rugby transfers (Australia) =

This is a list of player movements for Super Rugby teams prior to the end of the 2018 Super Rugby season. Departure and arrival of all players who were included in a Super Rugby squad for 2017 or 2018 are listed here, regardless of when it occurred. Future-dated transfers are only included if confirmed by the player or his agent, his former team, or his new team.

In addition to the main squad, teams can also name additional players who train in backup or development squads for the franchises. These players are denoted by (extended playing squad).

== Notes ==
- 2017 players listed are all players that were named in the initial senior squad, or subsequently included in a 23-man match day squad at any game during the season.
- (did not play) denotes that a player did not play at all during one of the two seasons due to injury or non-selection. These players are included to indicate they were contracted to the team.
- (short-term) denotes that a player wasn't initially contracted, but came in during the season. This could either be a club rugby player coming in as injury cover, or a player whose contract had expired at another team (typically in the northern hemisphere).
- Flags are only shown for players moving to or from another country.
- Players may play in several positions, but are listed in only one.

=== Brumbies ===
Brumbies transfers 2017–2018
| Pos | 2017 squad | Out | In | 2018 squad |
|---|---|---|---|---|
| PR | Allan Alaalatoa; Ben Alexander; Leslie Leulua’iali’i-Makin; Nic Mayhew; Scott Sio; Faalelei Sione (extended playing squad) | | (substituted on) Mees Erasmus (from Perth Spirit) | Allan Alaalatoa; Ben Alexander; Mees Erasmus (extended playing squad); Leslie Leulua’iali’i-Makin; Nic Mayhew; Scott Sio; Faalelei Sione |
| HK | Robbie Abel; Saia Fainga'a; Joshua Mann-Rea | (substituted off) Saia Fainga'a (to (England) London Irish) | (substituted on) Folau Fainga'a (from NSW Country Eagles); (substituted on) Connal McInerney (from NSW Country Eagles) | Robbie Abel; Folau Fainga'a (extended playing squad); Joshua Mann-Rea; Connal McInerney (short-term) |
| LK | Rory Arnold; Sam Carter; Blake Enever; Tom Staniforth | (substituted off) Tom Staniforth (to Waratahs) | (substituted on) Richie Arnold (from Force); (substituted on) Darcy Swain (from Canberra Vikings) | Richie Arnold; Rory Arnold; Sam Carter; Blake Enever; Darcy Swain (extended playing squad) |
| FL | Chris Alcock; Tom Cusack; Scott Fardy; Jordan Smiler; Rob Valetini (extended playing squad, did not play) | (substituted off) Chris Alcock (to (Japan) Kamaishi Seawaves); (substituted off) Scott Fardy (to (Ireland) Leinster); (substituted off) Jordan Smiler (to (Japan) Suntory Sungoliath) | (substituted on) Lachlan McCaffrey (from (England) Leicester Tigers); (substituted on) Michael Oakman-Hunt (from Canberra Vikings); (substituted on) David Pocock (return from sabbatical) | Tom Cusack; Lachlan McCaffrey; Michael Oakman-Hunt (short-term); David Pocock; Rob Valetini |
| N8 | Jarrad Butler; Lolo Fakaosilea; Ben Hyne (extended playing squad) | (substituted off) Jarrad Butler (to (Ireland) Connacht) | (substituted on) Isi Naisarani (from Force) | Lolo Fakaosilea; Ben Hyne (did not play); Isi Naisarani |
| SH | Tomás Cubelli; Ryan Lonergan; Joe Powell; De Wet Roos (short-term) | (substituted off) Tomás Cubelli (to (Argentina) Jaguares); (substituted off) De Wet Roos (to Southern Districts) | (substituted on) Matt Lucas (from Waratahs) | Ryan Lonergan (extended playing squad, did not play); Matt Lucas; Joe Powell |
| FH | Wharenui Hawera; Nick Jooste (did not play); Christian Lealiifano; Isaac Thompson (supplementary player) | (substituted off) Nick Jooste (to Perth Spirit); (substituted off) Isaac Thompson (to (Japan) Mazda Blue Zoomers) | | Wharenui Hawera; Christian Lealiifano |
| CE | Anthony Fainga'a (did not play); Kyle Godwin; Jordan Jackson-Hope (extended playing squad); Tevita Kuridrani; Andrew Smith | (substituted off) Anthony Fainga'a (returned to (Japan) Kintetsu Liners) | | Kyle Godwin; Jordan Jackson-Hope; Tevita Kuridrani; Andrew Smith |
| WG | Nigel Ah Wong; James Dargaville; Andy Muirhead (short-term); Henry Speight; Lausii Taliauli (did not play) | (substituted off) Nigel Ah Wong (to (New Zealand) Counties Manukau) | (substituted on) Chance Peni (from Force) | James Dargaville; Andy Muirhead (extended playing squad); Chance Peni; Henry Speight; Lausii Taliauli |
| FB | Tom Banks; Aidan Toua | (substituted off) Aidan Toua (to Reds) | (substituted on) Mack Hansen (from Canberra Vikings); (substituted on) James Verity-Amm (from Force) | Tom Banks; Mack Hansen (did not play); James Verity-Amm (extended playing squad) |
| Coach | Stephen Larkham | (substituted off) Stephen Larkham (to Australia (assistant)) | (substituted on) Dan McKellar (from assistant coach) | Dan McKellar |

=== Force ===
On 11 August 2017, the Australian Rugby Union announced that the Force's Super Rugby licence would be discontinued, following an earlier decision from SANZAAR to reduce the number of Australian teams from five teams to four for 2018. All players moved to the Force World Series Rugby team unless otherwise indicated.

Force transfers 2017–2018
| Pos | 2017 squad | Out | In | 2018 squad |
|---|---|---|---|---|
| PR | Jermaine Ainsley; Pekahou Cowan; Ben Daley; Tetera Faulkner; Francois van Wyk; Shambeckler Vui | (substituted off) Jermaine Ainsley (to Rebels); (substituted off) Pekahou Cowan (to Perth Spirit); (substituted off) Ben Daley (to Rebels); (substituted off) Tetera Faulkner (to Rebels); (substituted off) Francois van Wyk (to (England) Northampton Saints); (substituted off) Shambeckler Vui (to Waratahs) | —N/a | —N/a |
| HK | Tatafu Polota-Nau; Anaru Rangi; Harry Scoble (did not play); Heath Tessmann | (substituted off) Tatafu Polota-Nau (to (England) Leicester Tigers); (substituted off) Anaru Rangi (to Rebels) | —N/a | —N/a |
| LK | Richie Arnold; Lewis Carmichael (short-term); Adam Coleman; Onehunga Havili (development squad); Ben Matwijow (did not play); Matt Philip | (substituted off) Richie Arnold (to Brumbies); (substituted off) Lewis Carmichael (returned to (Scotland) Edinburgh); (substituted off) Adam Coleman (to Rebels); (substituted off) Onehunga Havili (to Perth Spirit); (substituted off) Ben Matwijow (retired); (substituted off) Matt Philip (to Rebels) | —N/a | —N/a |
| FL | Angus Cottrell (did not play); Richard Hardwick; Ross Haylett-Petty; Matt Hodgson; Kane Koteka; Brynard Stander | (substituted off) Angus Cottrell (to Rebels); (substituted off) Richard Hardwick (to Rebels); (substituted off) Ross Haylett-Petty (to Rebels); (substituted off) Matt Hodgson (retired); (substituted off) Kane Koteka (to (Japan) Kamaishi Seawaves) | —N/a | —N/a |
| N8 | Ben McCalman; Isi Naisarani | (substituted off) Ben McCalman (to Perth Spirit); (substituted off) Isi Naisarani (to Brumbies) | —N/a | —N/a |
| SH | Ryan Louwrens; Ian Prior; Michael Ruru; Mitch Short (short-term) | (substituted off) Michael Ruru (to Rebels); (substituted off) Mitch Short (to Waratahs) | —N/a | —N/a |
| FH | Peter Grant; Jono Lance | (substituted off) Jono Lance (to Reds) | —N/a | —N/a |
| CE | Luke Burton; Bill Meakes; Chance Peni | (substituted off) Luke Burton (to (France) Biarritz); (substituted off) Bill Meakes (to Rebels); (substituted off) Chance Peni (to Brumbies) | —N/a | —N/a |
| WG | Marcel Brache; Robbie Coleman; Semisi Masirewa; Luke Morahan; Curtis Rona; James Verity-Amm | (substituted off) Robbie Coleman (to (France) Narbonne); (substituted off) Semisi Masirewa (to (Japan) Sunwolves); (substituted off) Luke Morahan (to (England) Bristol); (substituted off) Curtis Rona (to Waratahs); (substituted off) James Verity-Amm (to Brumbies) | —N/a | —N/a |
| FB | Dane Haylett-Petty; Alex Newsome | (substituted off) Dane Haylett-Petty (to Rebels); (substituted off) Alex Newsome (to Waratahs) | —N/a | —N/a |
| Coach | David Wessels | (substituted off) David Wessels (to Rebels) | —N/a | —N/a |

=== Rebels ===
Rebels transfers 2017–2018
| Pos | 2017 squad | Out | In | 2018 squad |
|---|---|---|---|---|
| PR | Cruze Ah-Nau; Tyrel Lomax; Tim Metcher (did not play); Tom Moloney; Fereti Sa'aga (development squad); Toby Smith; Laurie Weeks | (substituted off) Cruze Ah-Nau (to (Italy) Zebre); (substituted off) Tyrel Lomax (to (New Zealand) Highlanders); (substituted off) Tim Metcher (to (United States) Seattle Seawolves); (substituted off) Toby Smith (to (New Zealand) Hurricanes) | (substituted on) Jermaine Ainsley (from Force); (substituted on) Ben Daley (from Force); (substituted on) Pone Fa'amausili (from Melbourne Rising); (substituted on) Tetera Faulkner (from Force); (substituted on) Sam Talakai (from Reds) | Jermaine Ainsley; Ben Daley; Pone Fa'amausili (supplementary squad); Tetera Faulkner; Tom Moloney (did not play); Fereti Sa'aga; Sam Talakai; Laurie Weeks (did not play) |
| HK | James Hanson; Patrick Leafa; Siliva Siliva; Jordan Uelese | (substituted off) James Hanson (to (England) Gloucester); (substituted off) Patrick Leafa (to (France) Vannes); (substituted off) Siliva Siliva (to Melbourne Rising) | (substituted on) Nathan Charles (from (England) Bath); (substituted on) Sama Malolo (from Perth Spirit); (substituted on) Anaru Rangi (from Force); (substituted on) Mahe Vailanu (from Melbourne Rising) | Nathan Charles (short-term); Sama Malolo (supplementary squad); Anaru Rangi; Jordan Uelese; Mahe Vailanu (short-term) |
| LK | Steve Cummins; Dominic Day; Murray Douglas (short-term); Esei Ha'angana (development squad); Sam Jeffries (did not play); Culum Retallick; Alex Toolis (did not play) | (substituted off) Steve Cummins (to (Wales) Scarlets); (substituted off) Dominic Day (to (England) Saracens); (substituted off) Murray Douglas (to (New Zealand) Hurricanes); (substituted off) Esei Ha'angana (to supplementary squad); (substituted off) Culum Retallick (to (New Zealand) Bay of Plenty); (substituted off) Alex Toolis (to Melbourne Rising) | (substituted on) Adam Coleman (from Force); (substituted on) Geoff Parling (from (England) Exeter Chiefs); (substituted on) Matt Philip (from Force) | Adam Coleman; Sam Jeffries; Geoff Parling; Matt Philip |
| FL | Colby Fainga'a; Harley Fox (did not play); Rob Leota (did not play); Sean McMahon; Will Miller (short-term); Jordy Reid; Jake Schatz; Hugh Sinclair (short-term) | (substituted off) Harley Fox (to (Ireland) Connacht); (substituted off) Sean McMahon (to (Japan) Suntory Sungoliath); (substituted off) Will Miller (to Waratahs); (substituted off) Jordy Reid (to (England) Ealing Trailfinders); (substituted off) Jake Schatz (to (England) London Irish); (substituted off) Hugh Sinclair (to Sydney Rays) | (substituted on) Angus Cottrell (from Force); (substituted on) Richard Hardwick (from Force); (substituted on) Ross Haylett-Petty (from Force) | Angus Cottrell; Colby Fainga'a; Richard Hardwick; Ross Haylett-Petty; Rob Leota (did not play) |
| N8 | Amanaki Mafi; Lopeti Timani | | | Amanaki Mafi; Lopeti Timani |
| SH | Harrison Goddard (development squad); Ben Meehan; Michael Snowden; Nic Stirzaker | (substituted off) Ben Meehan (to (England) London Irish); (substituted off) Michael Snowden (to Waratahs); (substituted off) Nic Stirzaker (to (England) Saracens) | (substituted on) Will Genia (from (France) Stade Français); (substituted on) Michael Ruru (from Force) | Will Genia; Harrison Goddard; Michael Ruru |
| FH | Jack Debreczeni; Jackson Garden-Bachop; Jack McGregor (did not play); Ben Volavola | (substituted off) Jackson Garden-Bachop (to (New Zealand) Hurricanes); (substituted off) Ben Volavola (to (New Zealand) North Harbour) | (substituted on) Tayler Adams (from NSW Country Eagles) | Tayler Adams; Jack Debreczeni (supplementary squad); Jack McGregor (did not play) |
| CE | Reece Hodge; Mitch Inman; Dennis Pili-Gaitau (did not play); Sione Tuipulotu; Semisi Tupou (development squad) | (substituted off) Mitch Inman (to (France) Oyonnax); (substituted off) Dennis Pili-Gaitau (to Greater Sydney Rams) | (substituted on) David Horwitz (from Waratahs); (substituted on) Bill Meakes (from Force) | Reece Hodge; David Horwitz (did not play); Bill Meakes; Sione Tuipulotu (did not play); Semisi Tupou |
| WG | Tom English; Pama Fou (did not play); Kentaro Kodama (did not play); Marika Koroibete; Sefa Naivalu; Dom Shipperley (did not play) | (substituted off) Pama Fou (to supplementary squad); (substituted off) Kentaro Kodama (returned to (Japan) Panasonic Wild Knights); (substituted off) Dom Shipperley (retired) | (substituted on) Henry Hutchison (from Australia Sevens) | Tom English; Henry Hutchison (did not play); Marika Koroibete; Sefa Naivalu |
| FB | Jack Maddocks; Jonah Placid | (substituted off) Jonah Placid (to (France) Toulon) | (substituted on) Dane Haylett-Petty (from Force) | Dane Haylett-Petty; Jack Maddocks |
| Coach | Tony McGahan | (substituted off) Tony McGahan (to Reds (assistant coach)) | (substituted on) David Wessels (from Force) | David Wessels |

=== Reds ===
Reds transfers 2017–2018
| Pos | 2017 squad | Out | In | 2018 squad |
|---|---|---|---|---|
| PR | Sef Fa'agase; Phil Kite (short-term); Kirwan Sanday (short-term); James Slipper; Sam Talakai; Taniela Tupou; Markus Vanzati | (substituted off) Phil Kite (to (France) Vannes); (substituted off) Kirwan Sanday (to Queensland Country); (substituted off) Sam Talakai (to Rebels) | (substituted on) Harry Hoopert (from Brothers); (substituted on) JP Smith (from USC); (substituted on) Ruan Smith (from (Japan) Toyota Verblitz) | Sef Fa'agase; Harry Hoopert; James Slipper; JP Smith; Ruan Smith; Taniela Tupou; Markus Vanzati (did not play) |
| HK | Alex Mafi; Stephen Moore; Andrew Ready | (substituted off) Stephen Moore (retired) | (substituted on) Brandon Paenga-Amosa (from NSW Country Eagles) | Alex Mafi; Brandon Paenga-Amosa; Andrew Ready |
| LK | Kane Douglas; Cadeyrn Neville; Izack Rodda; Rob Simmons; Lukhan Tui | (substituted off) Cadeyrn Neville (to (Japan) Toyota Industries Shuttles); (substituted off) Rob Simmons (to Waratahs) | (substituted on) Angus Blyth (from Bond University); (substituted on) Harry Hockings (from University of Queensland) | Angus Blyth; Kane Douglas; Harry Hockings; Izack Rodda; Lukhan Tui |
| FL | Michael Gunn (did not play); Reece Hewat; Leroy Houston; Adam Korczyk; George Smith; Caleb Timu | (substituted off) Leroy Houston (to (France) Bordeaux) | (substituted on) Angus Scott-Young (from Queensland Country); (substituted on) Liam Wright (from Queensland Country) | Michael Gunn (did not play); Reece Hewat (did not play); Adam Korczyk; Angus Scott-Young; George Smith; Caleb Timu; Liam Wright |
| N8 | Scott Higginbotham; Hendrik Tui | (substituted off) Hendrik Tui (to (Japan) Suntory Sungoliath) | | Scott Higginbotham |
| SH | Nick Frisby; Moses Sorovi; James Tuttle | (substituted off) Nick Frisby (on loan to (France) Bordeaux) | (substituted on) Tate McDermott (from Queensland Country) | Tate McDermott; Moses Sorovi; James Tuttle |
| FH | Quade Cooper; Jake McIntyre; Hamish Stewart (development squad) | (substituted off) Jake McIntyre (to Agen) | (substituted on) Jono Lance (from Force); (substituted on) Ben Lucas (from (Japan) Toyota Verblitz); (substituted on) Teti Tela (from Queensland Country) | Quade Cooper (did not play); Jono Lance; Ben Lucas; Hamish Stewart; Teti Tela |
| CE | Chris Feauai-Sautia (did not play); Samu Kerevi; Campbell Magnay; Duncan Paia'aua; Henry Taefu (did not play) | (substituted off) Campbell Magnay (to (Japan) Suntory Sungoliath); (substituted off) Henry Taefu (to (France) Colomiers) | (substituted on) Jordan Petaia (from Brisbane State High School) | Chris Feauai-Sautia; Samu Kerevi; Duncan Paia'aua; Jordan Petaia (short-term) |
| WG | Chris Kuridrani; Lachlan Maranta; Eto Nabuli; Jayden Ngamanu; Izaia Perese | (substituted off) Chris Kuridrani (to Brisbane City) | (substituted on) Filipo Daugunu (from Queensland Country) | Filipo Daugunu; Lachlan Maranta (did not play); Eto Nabuli; Jayden Ngamanu (short-term); Izaia Perese |
| FB | Karmichael Hunt | | (substituted on) Aidan Toua (from Brumbies) | Karmichael Hunt (did not play); Aidan Toua |
| Coach | Nick Stiles | (substituted off) Nick Stiles (to (Japan) Kintetsu Liners (forwards coach)) | (substituted on) Brad Thorn (from Queensland Country) | Brad Thorn |

=== Waratahs ===
Waratahs transfers 2017–2018
| Pos | 2017 squad | Out | In | 2018 squad |
|---|---|---|---|---|
| PR | Sekope Kepu; Dave Lolohea (short-term); Sam Needs (supplementary squad, did not play); Tom Robertson; Paddy Ryan; Matt Sandell (did not play); Angus Ta'avao | (substituted off) Dave Lolohea (to Sydney Rays); (substituted off) Sam Needs (to NSW Country Eagles); (substituted off) Angus Ta'avao (to (New Zealand) Chiefs) | (substituted on) Harry Johnson-Holmes (from NSW Country Eagles); (substituted on) Kalivati Tawake (from (Fiji) Fijian Drua); (substituted on) Shambeckler Vui (from Force); (substituted on) Cody Walker (from Sydney Rays) | Harry Johnson-Holmes; Sekope Kepu; Tom Robertson; Paddy Ryan; Matt Sandell (did not play); Kalivati Tawake (short-term); Shambeckler Vui; Cody Walker (did not play) |
| HK | Damien Fitzpatrick; Tolu Latu; Hugh Roach | | (substituted on) JP Sauni (from (New Zealand) Auckland) | Damien Fitzpatrick; Tolu Latu; Hugh Roach; JP Sauni (did not play) |
| LK | Ned Hanigan; Ryan McCauley (extended playing squad); David McDuling; Dean Mumm; Will Skelton; Senio Toleafoa (extended playing squad) | (substituted off) David McDuling (to Sydney Rays); (substituted off) Dean Mumm (retired); (substituted off) Will Skelton (to (England) Saracens); (substituted off) Senio Toleafoa (to (France) Nevers) | (substituted on) Nick Palmer (from (New Zealand) Hawke's Bay); (substituted on) Rob Simmons (from Reds); (substituted on) Tom Staniforth (from Brumbies) | Ned Hanigan; Ryan McCauley; Nick Palmer; Rob Simmons; Tom Staniforth |
| FL | Jack Dempsey; Michael Hooper; Michael Wells; Brad Wilkin (did not play) | | (substituted on) Kelly Meafua (from Greater Sydney Rams); (substituted on) Will Miller (from Rebels); (substituted on) Lachlan Swinton (from NSW Country Eagles) | Jack Dempsey (did not play); Michael Hooper; Kelly Meafua (did not play); Will Miller; Lachlan Swinton (did not play); Michael Wells; Brad Wilkin |
| N8 | Jed Holloway; Maclean Jones (short-term) | | | Jed Holloway; Maclean Jones (did not play) |
| SH | Jake Gordon (extended playing squad); Matt Lucas; Nick Phipps | (substituted off) Matt Lucas (to Brumbies) | (substituted on) Nick Duffy (from Sydney Rays); (substituted on) Mitch Short (from Force); (substituted on) Michael Snowden (from Rebels) | Nick Duffy (short-term, did not play); Jake Gordon; Nick Phipps; Mitch Short (short-term); Michael Snowden (short-term) |
| FH | Andrew Deegan (supplementary squad, did not play); Bernard Foley; Bryce Hegarty; Mack Mason (supplementary squad) | (substituted off) Andrew Deegan (to (Ireland) Connacht) | | Bernard Foley; Bryce Hegarty; Mack Mason (did not play) |
| CE | Rob Horne; David Horwitz; Irae Simone (extended playing squad) | (substituted off) Rob Horne (to (England) Northampton Saints); (substituted off) David Horwitz (to Rebels) | (substituted on) Kurtley Beale (from (England) Wasps); (substituted on) Lalakai Foketi (from (New Zealand) Bay of Plenty); (substituted on) Alex Newsome (from Force) | Kurtley Beale; Lalakai Foketi; Alex Newsome; Irae Simone (did not play) |
| WG | Cameron Clark; Andrew Kellaway; Taqele Naiyaravoro; Reece Robinson | (substituted off) Reece Robinson (to Sydney Roosters) | (substituted on) Curtis Rona (from Force) | Cameron Clark; Andrew Kellaway; Taqele Naiyaravoro; Curtis Rona |
| FB | Israel Folau; Harry Jones (extended playing squad, did not play) | (substituted off) Harry Jones (to (Japan) Toyota Industries Shuttles) | | Israel Folau |
| Coach | Daryl Gibson | | | Daryl Gibson |

== See also ==
- List of 2017–18 Premiership Rugby transfers
- List of 2017–18 Pro14 transfers
- List of 2017–18 Top 14 transfers
- List of 2017–18 RFU Championship transfers
- SANZAAR
- Super Rugby franchise areas
