= 2015 National Rugby Championship =

Australian rugby tournament

- Date: 20 August – 31 October 2015
- Champions: Brisbane City (2nd title)
- Runners-up: University of Canberra Vikings
- Matches played: 39
- Attendance: 56,547 (average 1,450 per match)
- Highest attendance: 4,327; Brisbane City 21–10 University of Canberra Vikings (31 October 2015)
- Lowest attendance: 300; Greater Sydney Rams City 39–63 Perth Spirit (10 October 2015)
- Top point scorer: Jake McIntyre (141); Brisbane City
- Top try scorer: Junior Laloifi (14); Brisbane City

Official website
- buildcorpnrc.com.au

The 2015 National Rugby Championship (known as the Buildcorp National Rugby Championship for sponsorship reasons) was the second season of Australia's National Rugby Championship, involving nine professional rugby union teams from around Australia. The competition kicked off 20 August 2015.

The regular season was dominated by two teams, Brisbane City and University of Canberra Vikings, who went on to play in the championship final. The deciding match, played at Ballymore, was won 21–10 by Brisbane to claim their second consecutive NRC title.

== Teams ==
Location of teams in the 2015 National Rugby Championship

Legend:
BC – Brisbane City
MR – Melbourne Rising
NSW – NSW Country Eagles
PS – Perth Spirit
QC – Queensland Country
CV – University of Canberra Vikings

SYD – Sydney (see below)
Location of the Sydney-based teams in the 2015 National Rugby Championship

GSR – Greater Sydney Rams
NHR – North Harbour Rays
SYD – Sydney Stars

The nine teams confirmed for the 2015 NRC season include four from New South Wales, two from Queensland, and one each from Australian Capital Territory, Victoria, and Western Australia:

Region	Team	Coach(es)	Captain(s)	Refs
ACT	University of Canberra Vikings	(Australia) Brad Harris	(Australia) Jarrad Butler	
NSW	NSW Country Eagles	(Australia) Darren Coleman	(Australia) Jono Lance	
NSW	Greater Sydney Rams	(Australia) Jim Williams	(Australia) Jed Holloway	
NSW	North Harbour Rays	(Australia) Geoff Townsend	(Australia) Luke Holmes	
NSW	Sydney Stars	(Australia) Peter Playford	(Australia) David Hickey	
QLD	Brisbane City	(Australia) Nick Stiles	(Australia) Liam Gill (Australia) Nick Frisby	
QLD	Queensland Country	(Australia) Jason Gilmore	(Australia) James Tuttle	
VIC	Melbourne Rising	(Australia) Zane Hilton	(Australia) Colby Fainga'a (New Zealand) Scott Fuglistaller	
WA	Perth Spirit	(Australia) Tai McIsaac	(Australia) Heath Tessmann (Australia) Ian Prior (Australia) Angus Cottrell	

Home match venues for the 2015 NRC season:

Region	Team	Match Venue	Capacity	City
ACT	University of Canberra Vikings	Viking Park	10,000	Canberra
NSW	NSW Country Eagles	Ann Ashwood Park	3,000	Bathurst
NSW	NSW Country Eagles	No. 2 Sports Ground	5,000	Newcastle
NSW	NSW Country Eagles	Chillingworth Oval	3,000	Tamworth
NSW	NSW Country Eagles	Woollahra Oval	5,000	Sydney
NSW	Greater Sydney Rams	Concord Oval	20,000	Sydney
NSW	Greater Sydney Rams	Granville Park	5,000	Sydney
NSW	Greater Sydney Rams	Forshaw Park	3,000	Sydney
NSW	Greater Sydney Rams	Parramatta Stadium	20,700	Sydney
NSW	North Harbour Rays	Manly Oval	5,000	Sydney
NSW	North Harbour Rays	Pittwater Park	10,000	Sydney
NSW	Sydney Stars	Leichhardt Oval	22,000	Sydney
QLD	Brisbane City	Ballymore	18,000	Brisbane
QLD	Queensland Country	Bond University, Gold Coast	5,000	Gold Coast
QLD	Queensland Country	Rugby Park	5,000	Rockhampton
QLD	Queensland Country	Sports Ground	9,000	Toowoomba
QLD	Queensland Country	Stockland Park	12,000	Sunshine Coast
VIC	Melbourne Rising	Holmesglen Reserve	3,000	Melbourne
VIC	Melbourne Rising	Frankston Park	8,000	Melbourne
VIC	Melbourne Rising	Simonds Stadium	34,074	Geelong
VIC	Melbourne Rising	Latrobe City Stadium	12,000	Morwell
WA	Perth Spirit	UWA Rugby Club	4,000	Perth

== Television coverage and streaming ==
One (or more) of the NRC matches each round is broadcast live via Fox Sports, typically the Thursday night match. Streaming of the three non-broadcast matches per round, usually played on Saturday or Sunday, is hosted by Fox Sports online. Discussion of the NRC competition is included on Fox Sports' Rugby HQ program on Thursday nights following the live match broadcast, and on the review show NRC Extra Time on Monday nights.

== Experimental Law Variations ==
The ARU was given approval by World Rugby (then known as the International Rugby Board) to conduct experimental law trials as part of the 2014 National Rugby Championship. These law variations were retained for the 2015 season. Consideration was given to reverting the value of a successful conversion kick to 2 points to restore a converted try to 7 points, but the 3 point conversion variation was retained.

NRC Law Variations 2014–2015

Existing Law of the Game	Variation
Law 9.A.1; Value of a Conversion goal - 2 points Value of a Penalty goal - 3 points Value of a Dropped goal - 3 points	Value of a Conversion goal - 3 points Value of a Penalty goal - 2 points Value of a Dropped goal - 2 points Previously trialled in South Africa's Varsity Cup.
Law 5.7(e); If time expires and the ball is not dead, or an awarded scrum or lineout has not been completed, the referee allows play to continue until the next time that the ball becomes dead. The ball becomes dead when the referee would have awarded a scrum, lineout, an option to the non-infringing team, drop out or after a conversion or successful penalty kick at goal. If a scrum has to be reset, the scrum has not been completed. If time expires and a mark, free kick or penalty kick is then awarded, the referee allows play to continue.	Non-offending team is allowed to kick the ball into touch after being awarded a penalty kick, which has been blown after time expires, and the lineout will take place.
Law 19.6; The player taking the throw-in must stand at the correct place. The player must not step into the field of play when the ball is thrown. The ball must be thrown straight, so that it travels at least 5 metres along the line of touch before it first touches the ground or touches or is touched by a player.	Latitude will be given to the throwing team if the opposing team does not compete for the ball near where the ball is received
Law 9.B.1(e); The kicker must take the kick within one minute and thirty seconds (ninety seconds) from the time a try has been awarded. The player must take the kick within one minute and thirty seconds even if the ball rolls over and has to be placed again.	Time limit reduced to 60 seconds for conversion kicks, and 45 seconds for penalty kicks.
Law 20.1(d); No delay. A team must not intentionally delay forming a scrum.	Team has 30 seconds to form a scrum from the time the referee gives the mark.
Law 20.12(c); When a team has won the ball in a scrum, the scrum half of the opposing team is offside if that scrum half steps in front of the ball with either foot while the ball is still in the scrum.	Opposing scrum half is not allowed to enter the gap between the flanker and number 8, even if they stay behind the ball
Law 21.2(a); The kicker must take the penalty or free kick at the mark or anywhere behind it on a line through the mark.	Increased latitude will be given to where penalty and free kicks are to be taken
Law 19.2(d); For a quick throw-in, the player must use the ball that went into touch. A quick throw-in is not permitted if another person has touched the ball apart from the player throwing it in and an opponent who carried it into touch. The same team throws into the lineout.	Players will be allowed to take quick throw-ins regardless of whether someone else has touched the ball
Law 17.2(d); Keeping players on their feet. Players in a maul must endeavour to stay on their feet. The ball carrier in a maul may go to ground providing the ball is available immediately and play continues.	Greater policing of this law, in order to discourage "hold up tackles", by ensuring that the tackler, who holds up a ball carrier in an effort to form a maul, does not collapse the maul as soon as it has formed.
Competition rule - Bonus point awarded for scoring 4 tries	Bonus point awarded if winning team scores 3 or more tries than their opponents. This particular system has been used in France's professional leagues since the 2007–08 northern hemisphere season.
Television match official protocols	Television match official to only be consulted about tries and in-goal plays.

== Regular season ==
The nine teams compete in a round-robin tournament for the regular season. Each team has four matches at home and four away, with one bye. The top four teams qualify for the title play-offs with semi-finals and finals.

During this section of the tournament, teams can also play for the Horan-Little Shield, a challenge trophy that is played for when a challenge is accepted or offered by the holders.

=== Standings ===
National Rugby Championship
Pos	Team	P	W	D	L	PF	PA	PD	TB	LB	Pts
1	Brisbane City HL	8	8	0	0	400	174	+226	6	0	38
2	Canberra Vikings	8	7	0	1	375	176	+199	6	1	35
3	Melbourne Rising	8	5	0	3	220	251	−31	0	0	20
4	Sydney Stars	8	4	0	4	241	314	−73	2	2	20
5	NSW Country Eagles	8	4	0	4	225	260	−35	1	2	19
6	Perth Spirit	8	3	0	5	276	271	+5	2	2	16
7	North Harbour Rays	8	2	0	6	275	339	−64	1	2	11
8	Queensland Country	8	2	0	6	230	336	–106	0	1	9
9	Greater Sydney Rams	8	1	0	7	242	363	−121	0	3	7
Updated: 18 October 2015; Source: rugbyarchive.net • Teams 1 to 4 (Green background) at the end of the regular season qualify for the Title play-offs. HL denotes the holder of the Horan-Little Shield.
Four points for a win, two for a draw, and no points for a bye. One bonus point for losing by eight or fewer (LB). One bonus point for the winning team scoring three or more tries than their opponent (TB); If teams are level on points in the standings, tiebreakers are applied in the following order: • Difference between points for and against • The match result between the tied teams • Total number of tries scored in the competition

=== Competition rounds ===
==== Round 1 ====
20 August 2015	Brisbane City	29–16	Perth Spirit	Ballymore, Brisbane
7:30 pm	Try: Hunt 19' c Laloifi 27' m Kerevi 49' c McIntyre 71' c Con: McIntyre (2/3) 20', 50'; Taefu (1/1) 72'	Report; Summary	Try: Koteka 35' c Cottrell 55' c Con: Prior (2/2) 36', 56'; Cards: Heiberg (yellow card) 11' to 21'	Attendance: 2,698; Referee: Will Houston

22 August 2015	North Harbour Rays	29–45	Sydney Stars	Manly Oval
3:00 pm	Try: Northam 4' m Adams 15' c Hill 43' c Holmes 53' c Con: Angus (3/4) 16', 44', 54'	Report	Try: Hickey 21' m Gordon 25' c Jones 28' c Robertson 30' c Hanson 39' c Coolican 68' c Con: Roberts (5/6) 25', 29', 31', 40', 69'	Attendance: 2,000; Referee: Graham Cooper

22 August 2015	(BP) Greater Sydney Rams	31–32	NSW Country Eagles	Merrylands RSL Rugby Park, Sydney
3:00 pm	Try: Heyer 5' m Masson 29' m Asquith 31' c Gillespie 46' c Kapa 59' m Con: Asquith (1/3) 32'; Ayoub (1/2) 47'; Cards: Munro (yellow card) 40' to 50'; Betham (yellow card) 50' to 60'	Report	Try: Brooks 17' c Stubbs 27' c Kellaway 35' c Miller 52' c Con: Lance (4/4) 19', 27', 37', 53'; Cards: Dowsett (yellow card) 27' to 37'	Attendance: 1,200; Referee: Angus Gardner

Horan-Little Challenge	23 August 2015	(BP) Queensland Country	31–39	Melbourne Rising	Bond University, Gold Coast
	3:30 pm	Try: Fa'agase (2) 20' c, 43' c Mitchell 10' m Taulagi 40' m Leilua 57' m Con: Greene (2/5) 21', 44'	Report	Try: Meehan (2) 15' c, 46' m Taliu 23' c Fuglistaller 25' c Leafa 52' m Shipperley 70' m Con: Debreczeni (3/6) 16', 24', 26; Pen: Debreczeni (0/1); Cards: Meehan (yellow card) 34' to 44'; Placid (yellow card) 64' to 74'	Attendance: 1,700; Referee: Nic Berry

Bye/s: University of Canberra Vikings

==== Round 2 ====
27 August 2015	Sydney Stars	50–40	Queensland Country	Leichhardt Oval, Sydney
7:30 pm	Try: Robertson (2) 31' c, 61' m Jones 10' c Clunies-Ross 15' m Gordon 40' c Hickey 45' c Philip 64' c Con: Roberts (4/6) 11', 32', 40', 46'; McGregor (1/1) 64'	Report; Summary	Try: Perese (2) 12' c, 59' c Tuttle 25' c Greene 50' c Duncan Paia'aua 73' c Con: Greene (5/5) 13', 26', 51', 60', 73'	Attendance: 400; Referee: Graham Cooper

Horan-Little Challenge	29 August 2015	Melbourne Rising	21–49	Brisbane City (BP)	Holmesglen Reserve, Melbourne
	2:00 pm	Try: Debreczeni 10' c Reid 18' c Vilitati 71' m Con: Debreczeni (2/3) 11', 19'; Cards: Tyler (yellow card) 52' to 62'	Report	Try: Setu 30' m Laloifi 44' c Neville 46' c Talakai 51' c Kerevi 76' c Higginbotham 81' c Con: Frisby (0/1); McIntyre (5/5) 45', 47', 52', 77', 81'	Attendance: 500; Referee: Angus Gardner

29 August 2015	NSW Country Eagles	13–37	University of Canberra Vikings (BP)	Woollahra Oval, Sydney
3:00 pm	Try: Baldwin 20' c Kellaway 69' m Con: Lance (1/2) 21'; Cards: Ed Stubbs (yellow card) 76' to 81'	Report	Try: Taliauli 22'; Butler 35' c Thompson 47' m Ah Wong 67' c Perry 67' c Con: Thompson (3/4) 23', 36', 68', 80'	Attendance: 2,623; Referee: Mike Lash

29 August 2015	Perth Spirit	26–45	North Harbour Rays	McGillivray Oval, Perth
3:30 pm AWST	Try: Hardwick (2) 12' c, 49' m Mocenacagi 23' m Konelio 52' c Con: Nikoro (1/2) 13'; Prior (1/2) 53'; Cards: Tessmann (yellow card) 36' to 46'; Cottrell (yellow card) 55' to 65'	Report	Try: Killingworth (2) 40' c, 45' c Holmes 16' c Northam 30' m Hunting 57' c Rorke 71 c Con: Angus (5/6) 17', 40', 46', 58', 72'	Attendance: 1,500; Referee: Andrew Lees

Bye/s: Greater Sydney Rams

==== Round 3 ====
3 September 2015	(BP) North Harbour Rays	40–45	Melbourne Rising	Manly Oval
7:30 pm	Try: Killingworth (32) 8' c, 27' c Angus 51' c Holmes 58' c Hill 61' c Con: Angus (5/5) 9', 28', 52', 59', 62'; Cards: O'Connor (yellow card) 64' to 74'	Report; Summary	Try: Johansson 14' c Reid 18' c Ili 23' c Debreczeni 33' c Meehan 38' c Fainga'a 72' m Con: Debreczeni (5/6) 14', 18', 24', 33', 39'; Cards: Johansson (yellow card) 48' to 58'	Attendance: 1,200; Referee: Mick Tanzer

5 September 2015	(BP) University of Canberra Vikings	58–26	Greater Sydney Rams	Viking Park, Canberra
2:00 pm	Try: Butler (2) 3' c, 24' c Niumata (2) 7' m, 76' c Arnold 39' c Fainifo 56' c Vaea 62' m Oakman-Hunt 71' c Con: Leali'ifano (6/8) 4', 25', 40', 57', 71', 77'	Report	Try: Needs (2) 27' m, 66' c Curtis 33' c Masson 45' m Con: Saifoloi (2/4) 34', 67'	Attendance: 2,178; Referee: Will Houston

5 September 2015	(BP) Sydney Stars	45–24	Perth Spirit	Leichhardt Oval, Sydney
3:00 pm	Try: Hale 21' m Hickey 35' c Carter 43' c Kingston 54' c Gordon 69' c Philip 80' c Con: Roberts (4/5) 36', 44', 55', 70'; McGregor (1/1) 80'; Cards: Whiteley (yellow card) 58' to 68'	Report	Try: Rovira 15' c Nikoro 27' c Jooste 48' c Con: Prior (3/3) 16', 28', 50'; Cards: Nikoro (yellow card) 53' to 63'; Rangi (yellow card) 35' to 45'	Attendance: 750; Referee: Mike Lash

6 September 2015	Queensland Country	24–44	Brisbane City (BP)	Sports Ground, Toowoomba
3:30 pm	Try: Samo 4' c Magnay 54' c Cornelsen 68' c Con: Greene (3/3) 5', 55', 69'	Report	Try: Laloifi (2) 48' c, 62' c Gibbon 13' m Hyne 37' c Gill 60' m Kuridrani 80' c Con: McIntyre (3/5) 38', 49', 63'; Taefu (1/1) 80'; Pen: McIntyre (1/1) 73'; Cards: Neville (yellow card) 65' to 75'	Attendance: 2,204; Referee: Damien Mitchelmore

Bye/s: NSW Country Eagles

==== Round 4 ====
Horan-Little Challenge	10 September 2015	(BP) Brisbane City	55–29	North Harbour Rays	Ballymore, Brisbane
	7:30 pm	Try: Gill (2) 13' c, 38' m Kerevi (2) 59' c, 80' c penalty try 12' c Tela 18' m Frisby 68' m Laloifi 73' c Con: McIntyre (3/5) 12', 14', 60'; Taefu (2/2) 74', 80'; Cards: Higginbotham (yellow card) 35' to 45'; Gill (yellow card) 65' to 75'	Report; Summary	Try: Holmes 29' m Northam 42' c Hill 62' c Bergelin 65' c Con: Angus (1/2) 43'; Hodge (2/2) 63', 66'; Cards: Pili-Gaitau (yellow card) 25' to 35' (yellow-red card) 50' to 80'	Attendance: 2,000; Referee: Rohan Hoffmann

12 September 2015	NSW Country Eagles	37–31	Sydney Stars (BP)	Chillingworth Oval, Tamworth
3:00 pm	Try: Lance (2) 21' c, 46' m Clifton 27' c, 49' c Figg 71' c Con: Lance (4/5) 23', 28', 50', 72'; Cards: Collins (yellow card) 78' to 80'	Report	Try: Jones (2) 61' c, 63' m Gordon 33' m Whiteley 40' c Kovacic 79' m Con: Roberts (2/5) 40', 62'; Cards: Whiteley (yellow card) 24' to 34'	Attendance: 1,500; Referee: Michael Hogan

12 September 2015	(BP) Greater Sydney Rams	31–37	Queensland Country	Forshaw Park, Sydney
3:00 pm	Try: Curtis 7' m, 68' c Godinet 31' m Hayes 40' m Tufui 49' c Con: Ayoub (2/5) 50', 69'	Report	Try: Greene (2) 4' c, 66' m Fainga'a 12' c Leilua 51' c Tupou 77' c Con: Greene (4/5) 5', 13', 52', 78	Attendance: 1,000; Referee: Andrew Lees

12 September 2015	(BP) Perth Spirit	23–26	University of Canberra Vikings	McGillivray Oval, Perth
3:30 pm AWST	Try: Rasolea 15' c Koteka 23' m Lacey 47' m Konelio 80' m Con: Burton (1/4) 16'	Report	Try: Alaalatoa (2) 20' c, 29' c Powell 4' c Con: Iona (3/3) 5', 21', 30'; Pen: Third (1/1) 76'; Cards: Fainifo (yellow card) 14' to 24'; Smiler (yellow card) 32' to 42'; Ah Wong (yellow card) 78' to 80'	Attendance: 1,200; Referee: Ed Martin

Bye/s: Melbourne Rising

==== Round 5 ====
17 September 2015	(BP) University of Canberra Vikings	76–16	Sydney Stars	Viking Park, Canberra
7:30 pm	Try: Vaea (2) 19' c, 25' c Ah Wong (4) 8' m, 32' m, 63' m, 78' c Abel 13' c Thompson 19' c Dargaville 42' m penalty try 56' c Iona 69' c Con: Leali'ifano (6/9) 14', 19', 20', 26', 70', 79'; Thompson (1/2) 57'	Report; Summary	Try: Stewart 45' c Carter 66' c Con: McGregor (2/2) 46', 67'; Cards: Coolican (yellow card) 40' to 50'; Latu (yellow card) 53' to 63'	Attendance: 1,223; Referee: Damien Mitchelmore

19 September 2015	Melbourne Rising	37–36	Greater Sydney Rams (BP)	La Trobe City Stadium, Morwell
2:00 pm	Try: English (2) 42' c, 80' c Fainga'a 30' m Placid 51' c Reid 77' c Con: Debreczeni (4/5) 43', 52', 78', 80'; Cards: Vilitati (yellow card) 15' to 25'; Timani (yellow card) 23' to 33'	Report	Try: McDougall (2) 53' c, 70' m Holloway (2) 60' m, 66' m Gillespie 17' m Carbone 34' c Con: Ayoub (2/6) 34', 54'; Cards: Holloway (yellow card) 40' to 50'	Attendance: 480; Referee: Matt O'Brien

19 September 2015	Queensland Country	34–64	Perth Spirit (BP)	Rugby Park, Rockhampton
6:00 pm	Try: Greene 31' c Leilua 53' m Tupou 71' c Turner 74' c Fitzgerald 78' m Con: Greene (2/3) 31', 72'; Malolua (1/2) 75'	Report	Try: Havili (2) 33' c, 50' c Koteka 6' c Prior 19' c Konelio 39' c Hardwick 40' c Nikoro 43' c Godwin 46' c Con: Prior (8/8) 6', 20', 34', 40', 41', 44', 47', 51'; Cards: Van Wyk (yellow card) 27' to 37'; Hardwick (yellow card) 62' to 72'; Heiberg (yellow card) 70' to 80'	Attendance: 2,000; Referee: Rohan Hoffmann

Horan-Little Challenge	20 September 2015	(BP) Brisbane City	61–29	NSW Country Eagles	Ballymore, Brisbane
	3:30 pm	Try: Kerevi (2) 57' c, 63' m Higginbotham 18' c Neville 25' c Hunt 40' c Laloifi 48' c Kuridrani 53' c Gibbon 78' c Con: McIntyre (7/8) 19', 26', 40', 49', 54', 58', 79'	Report	Try: Tuala (2) 14' c, 22' c Pennington 3' m Roods 71' c Con: Lance (2/3) 15', 23'; Harvey (1/1) 72'	Attendance: 1,816; Referee: Nic Berry

Bye/s: North Harbour Rays

==== Round 6 ====
24 September 2015	(BP) NSW Country Eagles	16–24	Queensland Country	Sports Ground No. 2, Newcastle
7:30 pm	Try: Feao 19' c Short 32' c Con: Lance (2/2) 20', 33'; Cards: Maraki (yellow card) 71' to 80'	Report; Summary	Try: Jones 11' c penalty try 49' c Tupou 74' c Con: Taumata (3/3) 12', 50', 75'	Attendance: 1,000; Referee: Ed Martin

26 September 2015	North Harbour Rays	37–63	University of Canberra Vikings (BP)	Pittwater Park, Sydney
3:00 pm	Try: Porch (2) 19' c, 63' m Hodge 10' c Pili-Gaitau 22' c Adams 48' c Con: Angus (4/5) 11', 20', 23', 49'; Cards: Elliott (yellow card) 21' to 41'; Bergelin (yellow card) 69' to 79'; Fraser (red card) 73'	Report	Try: Butler (2) 18' c, 40' c Fainifo (2) 71' c, 76' c Niumata 25' m Dargaville 36' m Arnold 44' c Ah Wong 55' m Vaea 67' c Con: Leali'ifano (6/9) 19', 40', 45', 68', 73', 77'; Cards: Ah Wong (yellow card) 10' to 20'; Dargaville (yellow card) 48' to 58'; Lomax (red card) 73'	Attendance: 3,000; Referee: Matt O'Brien

26 September 2015	Perth Spirit	31–21	Melbourne Rising	McGillivray Oval, Perth
3:30 pm AWST	Try: Lacey (2) 33' m, 39' m Louwrens 23' c Godwin 50' m Cottrell 62' c Con: Burton (1/3) 25'; Prior (1/1) 64'	Report	Try: Meehan 18' c Ili 36' m Placid 80' c Con: Debreczeni (2/3) 19', 80'; Cards: Fainga'a (yellow card) 54' to 64'	Attendance: 1,200; Referee: Graham Cooper

27 September 2015	(BP) Sydney Stars	44–32	Greater Sydney Rams	Leichhardt Oval, Sydney
3:00 pm	Try: Jones (3) 7' m, 24' m, 49' m Robertson 30' c Robinson 40' c Tuapou 44' m Yassmin 67' c Con: McGregor (2/6) 31', 40'; Kagiassis (1/1) 68'	Report	Try: Gillespie 10' c Meafua 16' c McDougall 59' c Holloway 76' c Con: Teki (4/4) 11', 17', 60', 77'; Cards: Meafua (yellow card) 44' to 54'	Attendance: 800; Referee: Andrew Lees

Bye/s: Brisbane City

==== Round 7 ====
1 October 2015	Greater Sydney Rams	23–21	North Harbour Rays (BP)	Pirtek Stadium, Sydney
7:30 pm	Try: Masson (2) 10' m, 26' c Hermens 22' m Hayes 71' m Con: Teki (1/4) 27'; Cards: Roos (yellow card) 6' to 16'	Report; Summary	Try: Hodge 7' c Porch 14' m Hill 64' c Con: Angus (1/2) 8'; Hodge (1/1) 65'	Attendance: 400; Referee: Andrew Lees

2 October 2015	(BP) University of Canberra Vikings	42–16	Melbourne Rising	Viking Park, Canberra
7:30 pm	Try: Butler 22' c penalty try 33' c Toua 38' m Vaea 54' m Fainifo 67' c, 71' c Con: Leali'ifano (4/6) 23', 34', 68', 72'	Report	Try: Debreczeni 25'; Shipperley 45'; Con: Debreczeni (2/2) 26', 46'; Cards: Cummins (yellow card) 31' to 41'; Ah-Nau (yellow card) 62' to 72'; Debreczeni (yellow card) 69' to 79'	Attendance: 1,200; Referee: Rohan Hoffmann

Horan-Little Challenge	2 October 2015	Sydney Stars	0–58	Brisbane City (BP)	Leichhardt Oval, Sydney
	7:30 pm	Cards: Toleafoa (yellow card) 40' to 50'	Report	Try: Laloifi (4) 5' c, 14' c, 18' c, 51' c Kuridrani 9' m Hunt 17' c Higginbotham 27' c Setu 70' m Con: McIntyre (6/7) 6', 15', 18', 19', 28', 52'; Taefu (0/1)	Attendance: 400; Referee: Will Houston

4 October 2015	(BP) Perth Spirit	29–32	NSW Country Eagles	McGillivray Oval, Perth
3:00 pm AWST	Try: Rasolea 34' c Hoskins 43' c Tessmann 48' c Hardwick 57' m Con: Prior (3/4) 35', 44', 48'; Cards: Rasolea (red card) 37'	Report	Try: Horwitz 20' c Kellaway 25' c McKenzie 38' c Stubbs 62' c Con: Lance (4/4) 21', 26', 39', 63'; Cards: Stubbs (yellow card) 32' to 42'; Maraki (yellow card) 56' to 66'	Attendance: 600; Referee: Damien Mitchelmore

Bye/s: Queensland Country

==== Round 8 ====
8 October 2015	Melbourne Rising	23–16	NSW Country Eagles (BP)	Simonds Stadium, Geelong
7:30 pm AEDT	Try: Fainga'a (2) 65' m, 71' c Placid 12' m Meehan 61' m Con: Meehan (1/1) 72'; Johansson (0/3); Cards: Timani (yellow card) 30' to 40'; Jeffries (yellow card) 38' to 48'	Report; Summary	Try: Sexton 4' c McKenzie 48' c Con: Lance (2/2) 5', 49'; Cards: Baldwin (yellow card) 11' to 21'; Kuate (yellow card) 64' to 74'	Attendance: 500; Referee: Matt O'Brien

Horan-Little Challenge	10 October 2015	(BP) University of Canberra Vikings	31–37	Brisbane City	Viking Park, Canberra
	2:00 pm AEDT	Try: Holloway (3) 16' m, 28' c, 50' m Gibbon 43' c Pakalani 59' c Munro 65' m Con: Teki (2/3) 29', 43'; Adams (1/3) 60'	Report	Try: Nikoro (2) 8' c, 73' m Apineru (2) 12' c, 32' m Louwrens (2) 34' c, 54' m Konelio 3' c Lacey 23' c Godwin 38' c Con: Prior (6/9) 4', 9', 13', 23', 35', 38'	Attendance: 2,175; Referee: Andrew Lees

10 October 2015	(BP) North Harbour Rays	50–32	Queensland Country	Pittwater Park, Sydney
3:00 pm AEDT	Try: Holmes (2) 15' c, 21' c Holmes (2) 40' m, 57' c Adams (2) 51' m, 73' c Lane 76' c Con: Angus (5/7) 16', 22', 57', 74', 77'	Report	Try: Fa'agase 12' c Potgieter 19' c Tuttle 36' c Magnay 50' c Con: Greene (4/4) 12', 20', 37', 51'	Attendance: 800; Referee: Ed Martin

10 October 2015	Greater Sydney Rams	39–63	Perth Spirit (BP)	Concord Oval, Sydney
3:00 pm AEDT	Try: Butler 3' m Abel 48' c Iona 53' m Anae 59' m Leulua’iali’i-Makin 69' c Con: Leali'ifano (2/5) 49', 70	Report	Try: Paraka 11' c Laloifi 31' c Hyne 36' c Hunt 41' c Gill 64' m Con: McIntyre (4/5) 12', 32', 37', 41'; Cards: Vanzati (yellow card) 68' to 78'	Attendance: 300; Referee: Nic Berry

Bye/s: Sydney Stars

==== Round 9 ====
15 October 2015	Queensland Country	8–42	University of Canberra Vikings (BP)	Stockland Stadium, Sunshine Coast
7:30 pm AEST	Try: Tuttle 28'; Con: Greene (1/1) 29'	Report; Summary	Try: Third 4'; Hamlin 14'; Dargaville 22'; Leulua’iali’i-Makin 43'; Taliauli 48'; Penca 54'; Con: Thompson (4/6) 5', 15', 44', 55'	Attendance: 1,151; Referee: Graham Cooper

17 October 2015	(BP) NSW Country Eagles	50–24	North Harbour Rays	Ann Ashwood Park, Bathurst
4:00 pm AEDT	Try: Figg (2) 7' c, 31' c Horowitz 15' c Stubbs 46' m Kellaway 57' m Short 75' c Tuala 80' c Con: Lance (5/7) 8', 16', 32', 76', 80'	Report	Try: Holmes (2) 51' c, 68 c Bergelin 60' c Con: Angus (3/3) 52' 61' 69'; Cards: Killingworth (yellow card) 21' to 31'	Attendance: 1,200; Referee: Nic Berry

Horan-Little Challenge	17 October 2015	(BP) Brisbane City	71–24	Greater Sydney Rams	Ballymore, Brisbane
	3:30 pm AEST	Try: Laloifi (3) 28' c, 58' m, 80' m Gibbon (2) 31' m, 59' c Korczyk 7' c Kerevi 10' c Hunt 46' c Sorovi 62' c Tela 66' c Con: McIntyre (7/8) 8', 11', 29', 47', 58', 63', 67'; Talakai (0/1); Taefu (0/1); Cards: Gibbon (yellow card) 36' to 46'	Report	Try: Meafua 19' c penalty try 36' c Hayes 51' c Con: Roos (3/3) 20', 36', 51'; Cards: Orr (yellow card) 48' to 58'; Kapa (yellow card) 64' to 74'	Attendance: 2,250; Referee: Jordan Way

18 October 2015	Melbourne Rising	18–10	Sydney Stars (BP)	Frankston Park, Melbourne
1:30 pm AEDT	Try: Meehan 7' m Marsters 31' c Ili 37' m Con: Debreczeni (1/3) 32'	Report	Try: Jones 13' m Stewart 40' m Con: Roberts (0/2)	Attendance: 1,140; Referee: Will Houston

Bye/s: Perth Spirit

== Title play-offs ==
The top four sides in the regular season advanced to the semifinals of the knock-out stage, which was followed by the final to decide the National Rugby Championship title.

=== Semi-finals ===
23 October 2015	University of Canberra Vikings	50–34	Melbourne Rising	Viking Park, Canberra
7:30pm AEDT	Try: Iona (2) 9' m, 40' c Butler 3' c Alexander 28' c Fainifo 49' c Vaea 63' m penalty try 78' c Con: Leali'ifano (5/7) 4', 28', 40', 50', 79'	Report; Summary	Try: Ili 16' c Placid 22' m Ah-Nau 25' c Tuipulotu 33' m Fainga'a 59' c Con: Debreczeni (3/5) 16', 26', 59'	Attendance: 1,500; Referee: Will Houston

24 October 2015	Brisbane City	47–32	Sydney Stars	Ballymore, Brisbane
6:30pm AEST	Try: Gill (2) 28' m, 46' c Frisby (2) 57' c, 63' m Beauchamp 13' c Kerevi 53' c McIntyre 78' m Con: McIntyre (4/7) 14', 47', 55', 58'; Cards: Ready (yellow card) 48' to 58'; Neville (yellow card) 59' to 69'	Report; Summary	Try: Porter 9' c Wainwright 33' c Jones 37' c Carter 52' c Con: Roberts (4/4) 10', 34', 38', 53'; Cards: Tilse (yellow card) 48' to 58'; Hickey (yellow card) 76' to 80'	Attendance: 2,432; Referee: Rohan Hoffmann

=== Final ===
31 October 2015	Brisbane City	21–10	University of Canberra Vikings	Ballymore, Brisbane
3:00pm AEST	Try: Neville 5' c Frisby 32' m Gibbon 72' c Con: McIntyre (2/3) 5', 72'	Report; Summary	Try: Fainifo 1' m Thompson 11' m Con: Thompson (0/2); Cards: Abel (yellow card) 38' to 48'	Attendance: 4,327; Referee: Andrew Lees

Brisbane City	Canberra Vikings

FB	15	Karmichael Hunt
RW	14	Chris Kuridrani	(substituted off) 64'
OC	13	Samu Kerevi
IC	12	Henry Taefu
LW	11	Junior Laloifi
FH	10	Jake McIntyre
SH	9	Nick Frisby
N8	8	Adam Korczyk
OF	7	Liam Gill (c)
BF	6	Luke Beauchamp	(substituted off) 53'
RL	5	Cadeyrn Neville
LL	4	Ben Hyne	(substituted off) 53'
TP	3	Sam Talakai
HK	2	Andrew Ready
LP	1	Matt Mafi	(substituted off) 64'
Replacements:
HK	16	Ryan Freney
PR	17	Markus Vanzati	(substituted on) 64'
PR	18	Feao Fotuaika
LK	19	Corey Thomas	(substituted on) 53'
FL	20	Waita Setu	(substituted on) 53'
SH	21	Moses Sorovi
FH	22	Alex Gibbon	(substituted on) 64'
WG	23	Mika Tela
Coach:
Nick Stiles

FB	15	Isaac Thompson
RW	14	James Dargaville
OC	13	Nigel Ah Wong
IC	12	Rodney Iona
LW	11	Francis Fainifo	(substituted off) 60'
FH	10	Christian Lealiifano
SH	9	Joe Powell	(substituted off) 65'
N8	8	Ita Vaea	(substituted off) 43' (substituted on) 47' (substituted off) 55'
OF	7	Jarrad Butler (c)
BF	6	Jordan Smiler
RL	5	Blake Enever
LL	4	Rory Arnold	(substituted off) 54'
TP	3	Ben Alexander	(substituted off) 51'
HK	2	Robbie Abel	(substituted off) 71'
LP	1	Allan Alaalatoa	(substituted off) 66'
Replacements:
HK	16	Albert Anae	(substituted on) 43' (substituted off) 47' (substituted on) 71'
PR	17	Sione Taula	(substituted on) 66'
PR	18	Leslie Leulua’iali’i-Makin	(substituted on) 51'
LK	19	Dean Oakman-Hunt	(substituted on) 54'
FL	20	Rowan Perry	(substituted on) 55'
SH	21	Brent Hamlin	(substituted on) 65'
FH	22	Mitch Third
WG	23	Jerome Niumata	(substituted on) 60'
Coach:
Brad Harris

Man of the Match:
Nick Frisby

Assistant Referees:
Rohan Hoffmann (Australia)
Will Houston (Australia)
Television match official:
Greg Milne (Australia)

== Total season attendances ==
Club	Home Games	Total	Average	Highest	Lowest	% Capacity
Brisbane City	6	15,523	2,587	4,327	1,816	14%
Greater Sydney Rams	4	2,900	725	1,200	300	25%
Melbourne Rising	4	2,620	655	1,140	480	9%
North Harbour Rays	4	7,000	1,750	3,000	800	26%
NSW Country Eagles	4	6,323	1,581	2,623	1,000	47%
Perth Spirit	4	4,500	1,125	1,500	600	28%
Queensland Country	4	7,055	1,764	2,204	1,151	27%
Sydney Stars	4	2,350	588	800	400	3%
University of Canberra Vikings	5	8,276	1,655	2,178	1,200	18%

== Players ==
The leading scorers in 2015 over the regular season and finals combined were:

=== Leading try scorers ===
Top 7 try scorers
Pos	Name	Team	Tries excl. finals	Total tries
1	Junior Laloifi	Brisbane City	14	14
2	Harry Jones	Sydney Stars	8	9
3	Jarrad Butler	Canberra Vikings	7	8
3	Samu Kerevi	Brisbane City	7	8
5	Josh Holmes	North Harbour Rays	7	7
6	Nigel Ah Wong	Canberra Vikings	6	6
6	Jed Holloway	Greater Sydney Rams	6	6

Source: buildcorpnrc.com.au

=== Leading point scorers ===
Top 7 point scorers
Pos	Name	Team	Points excl. finals	Total points
1	Jake McIntyre	Brisbane City	118	141
2	Christian Lealiifano	Canberra Vikings	72	87
3	Hamish Angus	North Harbour Rays	86	86
4	Sam Greene	Queensland Country	83	83
5	Jono Lance	NSW Country Eagles	82	82
6	Jack Debreczeni	Melbourne Rising	69	78
7	Ian Prior	Perth Spirit	77	77

Source: buildcorpnrc.com.au

== Barbarians tour ==
After the NRC finals, an Australian Barbarians team selected from the NRC played a two-match tour against the New Zealand Heartland XV. NRC players that were not contracted for Super Rugby were eligible for the Barbarians. The series was won 2–0 by the Australian Barbarians.

10 November 2015	New Zealand Heartland XV	32–38	Australian Barbarians	Levin Domain, Manawatu-Wanganui
5.30 pm		Report

13 November 2015	New Zealand Heartland XV	24–40	Australian Barbarians	Cooks Gardens, Wanganui
6:00 pm		Report

2015 Australian Barbarians squad – NRC selection for the New Zealand tour^{^{a}}
Props: Duncan Chubb PR (Melbourne Rising); Jed Gillespie PR (Greater Sydney Rams)^{^{1}}; Tyrel Lomax PR (UC Vikings); Cameron Orr PR (Greater Sydney Rams); Hookers: Ryan Dalziel (c) HK (NSW Country Eagles); Harry Scobel HK (Perth Spirit)^{1}; Locks: Ben Hyne LK (Brisbane City); Nick Palmer LK(NSW Country Eagles)^{^{1}}; Phil Potgieter LK (Queensland Country)	Loose forwards: Mark Baldwin FL (NSW Country Eagles); Sam Figg FL, N8 (NSW Country Eagles); Dean Oakman-Hunt FL (UC Vikings); Rowan Perry FL (UC Vikings); Waita Setu FL (Brisbane City); Pauli Tuala FL, N8 (NSW Country Eagles); Scrum-halves: Mitch Short SH (NSW Country Eagles); De Wet Roos SH (Greater Sydney Rams); Fly-halves: Isaac Thompson FH, CE (UC Vikings)^{^{1}}	Centres: Rodney Iona CE, FH (UC Vikings); Tom Hill CE, WG (North Harbour Rays); Wings: Larry Hermens WG (Greater Sydney Rams)^{^{1}}; Harry Jones WG (Sydney Stars); Maalonga Konelio WG (Perth Spirit); Jarome McKenzie WG (NSW Country Eagles); Jack Pennington WG (Greater Sydney Rams)^{^{1}}; Fullbacks: Paul Asquith WG, FB (Greater Sydney Rams)

== See also ==
- Australian Rugby Championship (predecessor tournament)
- Super Rugby

== Notes ==
^a There were six late replacements made to the Barbarians squad with some players originally selected being unavailable to tour.
