= David Hickey =

David Hickey may refer to:

- David Hickey (Gaelic footballer), Gaelic footballer and doctor
- David Hickey (rugby union) (born 1991), Australian rugby union player
- David Francis Hickey (1882–1973), American-born bishop of the Catholic Church
- Dave Hickey (1938–2021), American writer
- David Hickey (politician), Canadian politician
