= Boyd Killingworth =

- Born: 6 April 1992 (age 34)
- Height: 1.83 m (6 ft 0 in)
- Weight: 101 kg (223 lb)

Rugby union career
Amateur team(s)
Years	Team	Apps	(Points)
2013–	Warringah		
Senior career
Years	Team	Apps	(Points)
2014–2015	Sydney Rays	10	(20)
2019	Melbourne Rising	0	(0)
2020	Melbourne Rebels	0	(0)
National sevens team
Years	Team		Comps
2015–	Australia 7s		

Boyd Killingworth (born 6 April 1992) is an Australian professional rugby union player. He completed his high school education at The King's School, Parramatta in Sydney's west. He represents Australia in Sevens Rugby. Born in Collaroy, NSW and playing for Warringah Rats at a club level, he debuted for Australia in December 2015. As of December 2019, he currently has 20 caps.

Boyd played every game for the North Harbour Rays in the 2015 National Rugby Championship. In Rugby Sevens, the Sydneysider also represented New South Wales in the National Sevens Championship in March 2015, helping his side win the title at the Sydney Academy of Sport in Narrabeen. Representative Honours include NSW 7s (2015), NRC North Harbour Rays (2014–15), National Academy (2011-2013), Waratahs A (2011) and the Australian Schoolboys (2010).

== Super Rugby statistics ==
As of 12 September 2020

Season	Team	Games	Starts	Sub	Mins	Tries	Cons	Pens	Drops	Points	Yel	Red
2020	Rebels	0	0	0	0	0	0	0	0	0	0	0
2020 AU	Rebels	0	0	0	0	0	0	0	0	0	0	0
Total		0	0	0	0	0	0	0	0	0	0	0
