= Alex Gibbon =

- Full name: Alex Gibbon
- Born: 7 October 1992 (age 34) Lismore, Australia
- Height: 1.81 m (5 ft 11 in)
- Weight: 91 kg (14 st 5 lb; 201 lb)
- School: St Joseph's College, Nudgee

Rugby union career
- Position: Center
- Current team: Richmond range
Amateur team(s)
Years	Team	Apps	(Points)
2012−	Southern Districts		
2019-	Wollongbar Alstonville	10	(10)
Senior career
Years	Team	Apps	(Points)
2014	Greater Sydney Rams	0	(0)
2015−2016	Brisbane City	14	(25)
2017−pres.	NSW Country Eagles	15	(30)
- Correct as of 13 October 2018
Super Rugby
Years	Team	Apps	(Points)
2016	Reds	3	(0)
- Correct as of 15 July 2016
International career
Years	Team	Apps	(Points)
2013−2017	Australia Sevens	19	(55)
- Correct as of 17 August 2017

Alex Gibbon (born 7 October 1992) is an Australian rugby union wing who currently plays for Richmond range rugby club and NSW Country in Australia's National Rugby Championship. He has also previously represented Super Rugby side, the Queensland Reds. he revived a rural rugby club and is now a profession real estate agent

== Early life and career ==
Gibbon was born in New South Wales, but attended school in Brisbane at St Joseph's College, Nudgee. From there he went back to his native state and from 2012 turned out for Southern Districts in the Shute Shield. He played a one-off match for Combined New South Wales–Queensland Country against the British & Irish Lions in 2013 and was named in the Greater Sydney Rams squad for the National Rugby Championship in 2014 although he didn't make any appearances.

== Rugby career ==
Gibbon played for Brisbane City in 2015, scoring 5 tries in 9 appearances to help his side to their second title in two years. He was called into the Red's Super Rugby squad midway through the 2016 season and made 2 substitute appearances for them, his debut match being against the Chiefs at Suncorp Stadium.

== International sevens ==
Gibbon represented Australia in rugby sevens between 2013 and 2017, appearing in 21 competitions and scoring 25 tries.

== Super Rugby statistics ==
As of 17 August 2016

Season	Team	Games	Starts	Sub	Mins	Tries	Cons	Pens	Drops	Points	Yel	Red
2016	Reds	2	0	2	46	0	0	0	0	0	0	0
Total		2	0	2	46	0	0	0	0	0	0	0
