= Jed Gillespie =

- Born: 4 August 1992 (age 34) Australia
- Height: 183 cm (6 ft 0 in)
- Weight: 120 kg (18 st 13 lb; 260 lb)
- School: The King's School, Parramatta
- University: Macquarie University
- Occupation: Lawyer

Rugby union career
- Position: Prop
Amateur team(s)
Years	Team	Apps	(Points)
2011-2020	Eastwood Rugby Club	(123)	
Senior career
Years	Team	Apps	(Points)
2014–2015	Greater Sydney Rams	15	(15)
2016	NSW Country Eagles	9	(0)
2017	Greater Sydney Rams	8	(0)
Super Rugby
Years	Team	Apps	(Points)
2015	Rebels	0	(0)

Jed Gillespie (born 4 August 1992) is an Australian rugby union player who played for the Rebels in the Super Rugby competition. His position of choice is prop.

== Early life ==
Jed played his early club football with the Epping Rams, playing both in the forward pack and the backline. He attended The Kings School, where he played in the school's First XV in 2010 and playing for the Australian Schoolboys team in the same year.

After the completion of his high school studies, Jed continued the Gillespie legacy at the Eastwood Rugby Club. At Eastwood, he quickly progressed through the colts program and into grade, where he won two Shute Shields in 2014 and 2015.

Jed is currently the Assistant Coach of Eastern Suburbs.

Jed is a qualified solicitor and an accomplished assembler of furniture.
