= Ed Stubbs =

Australian rugby player (born 1989)

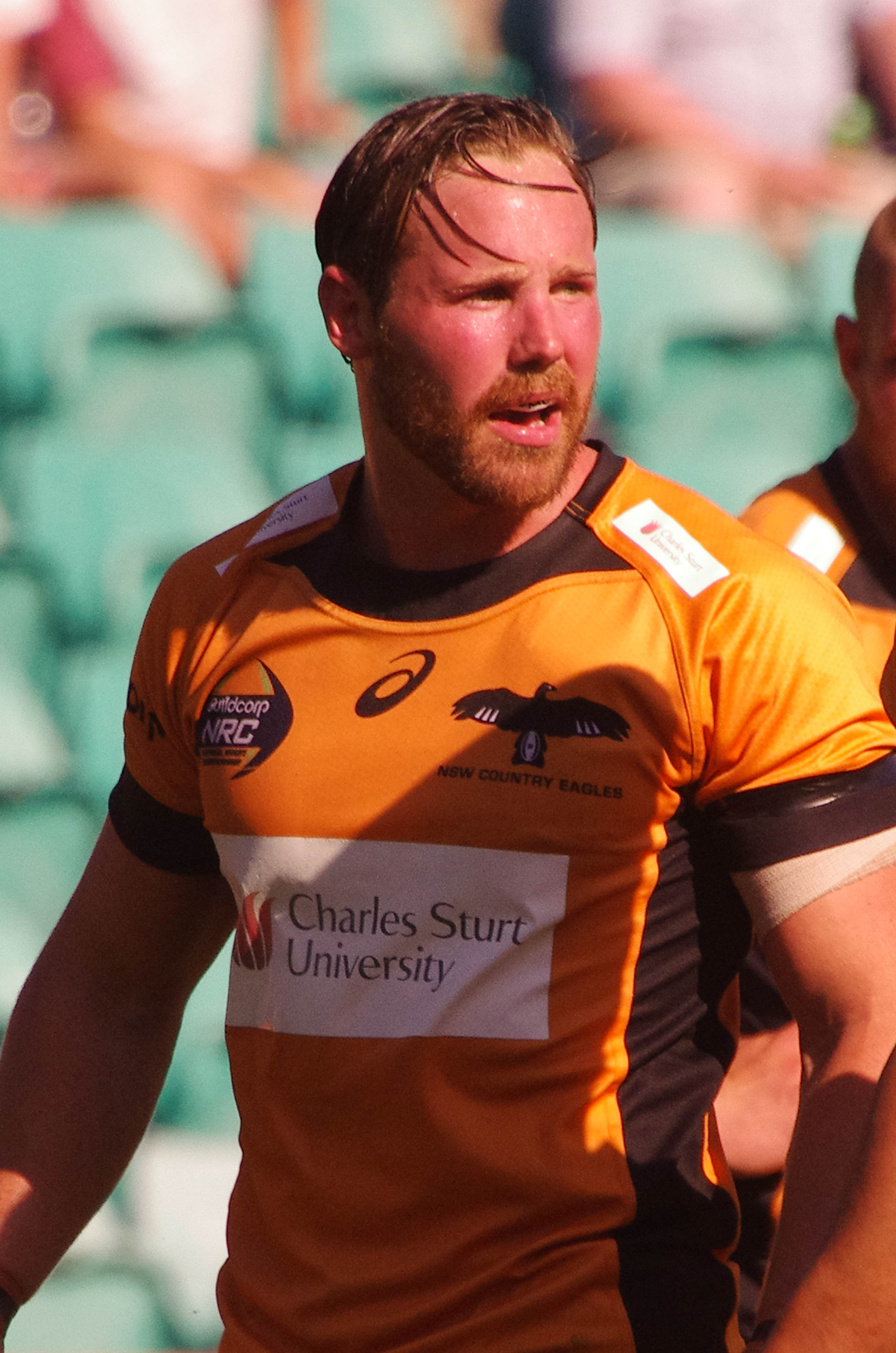
- Born: Ed Stubbs; 2 February 1989 (age 37) Sydney, Australia
- Height: 1.82 m (6 ft 0 in)
- Weight: 94 kg (14 st 11 lb; 207 lb)

Rugby union career
- Position: Centre / Wing
Senior career
Years	Team	Apps	(Points)
2014–	NSW Country Eagles	13	(25)
- Correct as of 4 November 2015
Super Rugby
Years	Team	Apps	(Points)
2010–11	Brumbies	3	(0)
2013–	Force	3	(0)
- Correct as of 10 June 2013
International career
Years	Team	Apps	(Points)
2010–12	Australia 7s	6	
- Correct as of 22 October 2012

Ed Stubbs (born 2 February 1989) is an Australian rugby union footballer. His regular playing position is either as a centre or a winger. He currently plays for the Western Force in Super Rugby.

== Rugby career ==
Stubbs joined the Brumbies academy in 2009, and made his Super 14 debut for the Brumbies against the Cheetahs in Canberra in 2010. He went on to make three appearances during the season and signed a full contract with the franchise. During 2010, Stubbs was selected in the Australian squad for the IRB World Sevens legs in Adelaide, Hong Kong, and also for London and Edinburgh, where the team finished first and second respectively. Stubbs was unfortunately ruled out of the Australian Sevens squad for the 2011 Commonwealth Games due to an osteitis pubis injury. He was a member of the 2011 Brumbies squad but did not play a match during the season. He returned to the Australian Sevens squad during the 2012 IRB World Sevens Series.

In 2013, Stubbs signed with the Western Force and played in his first game for team in the 16–14 win over the Crusaders.
