= Waita Setu =

- Born: 5 February 1992 (age 34) Auckland, New Zealand
- Height: 1.88 m (6 ft 2 in)
- Weight: 110 kg (17 st 5 lb; 243 lb)
- School: St Joseph's College, Nudgee

Rugby union career
- Position: Loose forward, Number 8
- Current team: Brisbane City
Youth career
- 2010−11: Brisbane Broncos
- 2012: Melbourne Storm
Amateur team(s)
Years	Team	Apps	(Points)
2015−	GPS		
Senior career
Years	Team	Apps	(Points)
2014	North Harbour	0	(0)
2015−	Brisbane City	10	(10)
2016	Reds	3	(0)
- Correct as of 17 August 2016
International career
Years	Team	Apps	(Points)
2012	Australia Schoolboys		
- Correct as of 17 August 2016

Waita Setu (born 5 February 1992) is a New Zealand-born Australian rugby union loose forward who currently plays for Brisbane City in Australia's National Rugby Championship. He has also previously represented Super Rugby side, the Queensland Reds.

== Early and provincial career ==
Setu was born in Auckland, New Zealand but moved to Australia as a child and attended the prestigious St Joseph's College, Nudgee in Brisbane. During this time he represented Queensland at Under 16 and schools levels. His early career was a nomadic one, with spells in the youth systems of Australian rugby league sides, the Brisbane Broncos and Melbourne Storm preceding a move across the Tasman Sea to New Zealand in 2014 where he linked up with union side North Harbour although he didn't manage any senior appearances. He was back in Australia in 2015 and played Queensland Premier Rugby with GPS, scoring 7 tries in his debut season and earning a call up to Brisbane City's National Rugby Championship winning squad.

== Super Rugby career ==
Setu was a member of the Melbourne Rebels wider training squad in 2015, but did not see any action. An injury to flanker Liam Gill gave Setu his Super Rugby break in 2016, he earned 3 Reds caps in total, 2 of which were from the start.

== International ==
Setu was an Australian Schoolboys representative in 2012.

== Super Rugby statistics ==
As of 17 August 2016

Season	Team	Games	Starts	Sub	Mins	Tries	Cons	Pens	Drops	Points	Yel	Red
2016	Reds	3	2	1	127	0	0	0	0	0	0	0
Total		3	2	1	127	0	0	0	0	0	0	0
