= David Hickey (rugby union) =

- Born: David Hickey; 12 June 1991 (age 35) Coonabarabran, NSW
- Height: 184 cm (6 ft 0 in)
- Weight: 97 kg (15 st 4 lb)
- School: St Joseph's College

Rugby union career
- Position: Openside Flanker
Senior career
Years	Team	Apps	(Points)
2011−	Sydney University	44	(40)
2014−	Sydney Stars	2	(0)
- Correct as of 21 August 2015
Provincial / State sides
Years	Team	Apps	(Points)
2013	Waratahs	0	(0)

David Hickey (born 12 June 1991) is an Australian rugby union player. He is currently the captain of the Sydney Stars team in the National Rugby Championship, and he previously played for the New South Wales Waratahs.

Hickey was born in Coonabarabran in the Central West of New South Wales. He attended St Joseph's College in Sydney where he played rugby for the first XV in 2008. Hickey joined the Sydney University rugby club, and was a member of the University's Shute Shield premiership-winning team in 2012.

In 2013 he played a pre-season match for the New South Wales Waratahs against the Crusaders. He signed on to play for the Sydney Stars for the inaugural season of the National Rugby Championship in 2014, and was named as captain of the team for the 2015 season.
