= Luke Beauchamp =

Australian rugby union player (born 1992)

- Born: 8 October 1992 (age 34) Brisbane, Queensland, Australia
- Height: 6 ft 3 in (1.91 m)
- Weight: 235 lb (107 kg)
- School: Marist Brothers Ashgrove

Rugby union career
- Position: Flanker
Amateur team(s)
| Years | Team | Apps | (Points) |
| 2012-2018 | Brothers Old Boys | | |
Senior career
| Years | Team | Apps | (Points) |
| 2014 | Queensland Country | 1 | (0) |
| 2015–2016 | Brisbane City | 17 | (17) |
| 2019–2022 | Houston Sabercats | 32 | (0) |
| 2023– | Chicago Hounds | | |
International career
| Years | Team | Apps | (Points) |
| 2011 | Australia u19s | | |

Luke Beauchamp (born 8 October 1992) is an Australian professional rugby union player. He currently plays for the Austin Gilgronis. He played as a flanker for the Chicago Hounds in Major League Rugby (MLR) previously playing for the Houston SaberCats. He also played for Brisbane City in the National Rugby Championship.
