= Michael Dowsett =

Australian rugby union player

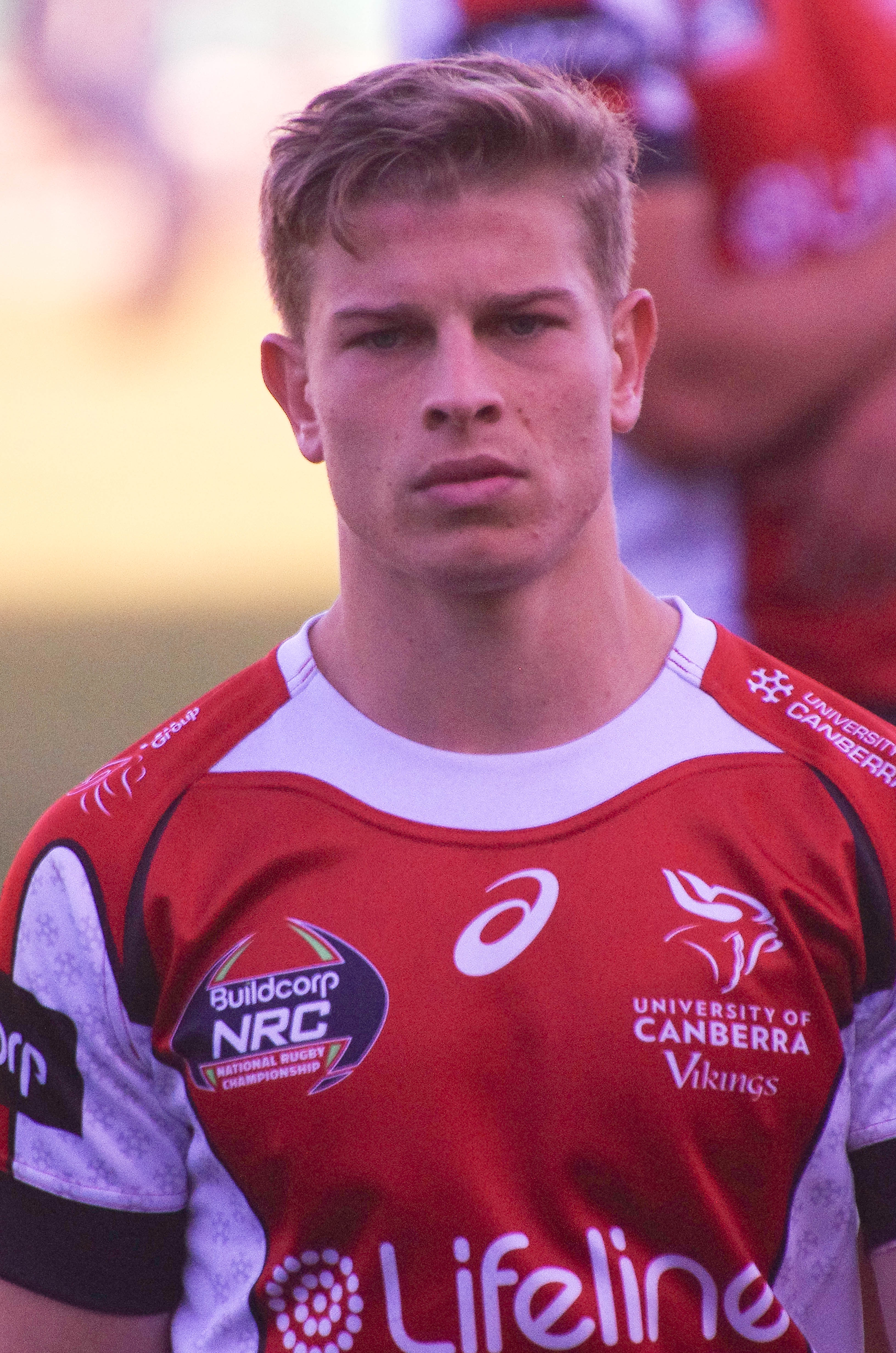
- Full name: Michael Dowsett
- Born: 23 March 1992 (age 34) Sydney, Australia
- Height: 1.82 m (6 ft 0 in)
- Weight: 85 kg (13 st 5 lb; 187 lb)
- School: Scots College

Rugby union career
- Position: Scrum-half
- Current team: Canon Eagles
Amateur team(s)
Years	Team	Apps	(Points)
2012−16	Northern Suburbs	14	(5)
2016	Uni-Norths Owls	8	
Senior career
Years	Team	Apps	(Points)
2014–2016	Brumbies	22	(5)
2014	Canberra Vikings	8	(0)
2015	NSW Country Eagles	1	(0)
2016	Southland	4	(0)
2016−2018	Worcester Warriors	7	(0)
2018−2020	Canon Eagles	7	(0)
2020–	Jersey Reds		
- Correct as of 18 November 2017

Michael Dowsett (born 23 March 1992) is an Australian rugby union player who plays as a scrum-half for the Jersey Reds in the RFU Championship.

== Rugby career ==
A native of Sydney, Dowsett first came to prominence playing for Northern Suburbs during the Shute Shield and a strong showing during the 2013 season saw him earn a place in the Brumbies Extended Playing Squad for the 2014 Super Rugby season. He eventually made his Super Rugby debut on 25 April 2014 as a late substitute for Nic White as the Brumbies defeated the Chiefs 41–23 in Canberra. He joined the NSW Country Eagles for the 2015 National Rugby Championship. In the 2015 Super Rugby season, Dowsett was a second-half substitute during the semi-final defeat against the Hurricanes.

In 2016, Dowsett featured for New Zealand side Southland Stags in the Mitre 10 Cup. In November 2016, Dowsett joined Aviva Premiership side the Worcester Warriors on a short-term deal. On 24 March 2017, Dowsett signed a permanent deal. He scored on his debut for the club in an Anglo-Welsh Cup victory against Bristol. Dowsett is qualified to represent England.

On 13 June 2020, Dowsett returns to England to join Jersey Reds in the RFU Championship for the 2020–21 season.

== Super Rugby statistics ==
As of 22 July 2016

Season	Team	Games	Starts	Sub	Mins	Tries	Cons	Pens	Drops	Points	Yel	Red
2014	Brumbies	6	0	6	44	0	0	0	0	0	0	0
2015	Brumbies	9	3	6	270	0	0	0	0	0	0	0
2016	Brumbies	7	1	6	108	1	0	0	0	5	0	0
Total		22	4	18	422	1	0	0	0	5	0	0
