= Jayden Ngamanu =

- Born: 28 August 1997 (age 29) Perth, Western Australia, Australia
- Height: 175 cm (5 ft 9 in)
- Weight: 86 kg (13 st 8 lb; 190 lb)
- School: Brisbane Boys' College

Rugby union career
- Position: Wing
Senior career
Years	Team	Apps	(Points)
2016–2018	Brisbane City	16	(10)
2020–2022	Yamaha Júbilo	7	(30)
Super Rugby
Years	Team	Apps	(Points)
2017–2018	Reds	2	(0)
International career
Years	Team	Apps	(Points)
2015	Australia Schools		
Medal record
Boy's rugby sevens
Representing Australia
Commonwealth Youth Games
Silver medal – second place	2015 Apia	Team competition

Jayden Ngamanu (born 28 August 1997) is an Australian rugby union player who plays for the Reds in the Super Rugby competition. His position of choice is wing. Ngamanu has also represented Australia at Schoolboy level.
