= Tetera Faulkner =

Australia international rugby union player

- Born: Tetera Faulkner; 26 July 1988 (age 38) Tauranga, New Zealand
- Height: 1.78 m (5 ft 10 in)
- Weight: 117 kg (18 st 6 lb)
- School: Cheltenham Secondary College; Marist College Canberra

Rugby union career
- Position: Prop
- Current team: Wanneroo Rugby Club, WA
Senior career
Years	Team	Apps	(Points)
2014−2017	Perth Spirit	7	(10)
2018–2019	Melbourne Rising	7	(0)
- Correct as of 2 October 2019
Super Rugby
Years	Team	Apps	(Points)
2011–2017	Force	70	(10)
2018–2019	Rebels	29	(5)
2020–2023	Waratahs	48	(5)
- Correct as of 19 March 2022
International career
Years	Team	Apps	(Points)
2014–2017	Australia	4	(0)
2008	Australia U-20		
2007	Australia U-19		
2006	Australian Schoolboys		
- Correct as of 18 February 2022

Tetera Faulkner (born 26 July 1988) is an Australian professional rugby union player. He currently represents the New South Wales Waratahs in the Super Rugby competition. His regular playing position is prop.

== Early life ==
Faulkner was born in Tauranga, New Zealand and lived his early years at Te Puna in the Bay of Plenty. At 12 years of age, he moved with his family to Melbourne, Australia. He played his junior rugby at Moorabbin Rams and played age-group representative rugby for Victoria. Faulkner attended Cheltenham Secondary College in Melbourne before transferring to Marist College Canberra. He played for the Australian Schoolboys team in 2006.

Faulkner represented Australia at the IRB Under 19 Rugby World Championship in Ireland in 2007. He represented Australia at Under 20 level at the inaugural IRB Junior World Championship in Wales in 2008.

== Rugby career ==
Faulkner played club rugby for Tuggeranong Vikings in Canberra from 2007, and joined the Brumby Runners development squad in 2008. In 2010, he transferred to the Southern Districts Rugby Club in Sydney and also played for the Junior Waratahs development side in the Pacific Rugby Cup.

In 2011 Faulkner was recruited to the Western Force to play in the 2012 season. He made an earlier than expected debut when called upon as an injury replacement late in the 2011 Super Rugby season. Faulkner earned his first Super Rugby cap on 17 June 2011, against the Rebels in Melbourne.

Faulkner currently plays his club rugby for Wanneroo Districts Rugby Football Club in Perth, Western Australia.

== Super Rugby statistics ==
As of 16 June 2019

Season	Team	Games	Starts	Sub	Mins	Tries	Cons	Pens	Drops	Points	Yel	Red
2011	Force	1	0	1	39	0	0	0	0	0	0	0
2012	Force	2	1	1	52	0	0	0	0	0	0	0
2013	Force	12	3	9	458	0	0	0	0	0	0	0
2014	Force	14	2	12	319	0	0	0	0	0	0	0
2015	Force	16	15	1	1090	2	0	0	0	10	1	0
2016	Force	10	7	3	495	0	0	0	0	0	0	0
2017	Force	15	8	7	701	0	0	0	0	0	0	0
2018	Rebels	13	10	3	734	0	0	0	0	0	2	0
2019	Rebels	16	12	4	805	1	0	0	0	5	0	0
Total		99	58	41	4740	3	0	0	0	15	3	0
