= Ben Hyne =

- Born: 7 March 1994 (age 32) Rockhampton, Queensland, Australia
- Height: 1.94 m (6 ft 4 in)
- Weight: 108 kg (17 st 0 lb; 238 lb)
- School: Downlands College, Queensland

Rugby union career
- Position: Lock / Loose forward
- Current team: Brumbies / Canberra Vikings
Amateur team(s)
Years	Team	Apps	(Points)
2012–2015	Brothers Old Boys		
Senior career
Years	Team	Apps	(Points)
2015	Brisbane City	9	(10)
2017–pres.	Canberra Vikings	4	(5)
- Correct as of 23 September 2017
Super Rugby
Years	Team	Apps	(Points)
2016–pres.	Brumbies	5	(0)
- Correct as of 15 July 2017

Ben Hyne (born 7 March 1994) is an Australian rugby union footballer who currently plays as a lock or loose forward for the Brumbies in the international Super Rugby competition. Domestically, he turns out for Canberra Vikings in the National Rugby Championship.

== Early career ==
A Queenslander by birth, Hyne was raised in Rockhampton, but attended school at Downlands College in Toowoomba. His first exposure to senior rugby was with Brothers Old Boys in the Queensland Premier Rugby competition in 2012. During his time with Brothers, he combined rugby with work as a carpenter.

Hyne's breakthrough came in 2015 when he was selected for the Brisbane City side which competed in and won that year's National Rugby Championship. In total, he played in 9 of City's 11 games during the campaign and helped himself to 2 tries.

Hyne relocated to Canberra for the 2016 season and played for the Tuggeranong Vikings. The club had a deep roster of second-row forwards during this period.

== Super Rugby career ==
Hyne's strong performances as a lock for Brisbane City did not go unnoticed and he was invited to Brumbies pre-season training ahead of the 2016 Super Rugby season. There he impressed head-coach Stephen Larkham who signed him on a development contract. Hyne made his debut as a number eight in a match against the Reds, however it didn't prove to be a happy beginning to his Super Rugby career with an injury forcing him to leave the field after only 5 minutes. He was ruled out for the remainder of the season, but he had done enough to be signed to the Brumbies Extended Playing Squad for the 2017 season.

== Super Rugby statistics ==
As of 14 August 2016

Season	Team	Games	Starts	Sub	Mins	Tries	Cons	Pens	Drops	Points	Yel	Red
2016	Brumbies	1	1	0	5	0	0	0	0	0	0	0
2017	Brumbies	4	1	3	94	0	0	0	0	0	0	0
Total		5	2	3	99	0	0	0	0	0	0	0
