= Junior Laloifi =

- Born: 25 September 1994 (age 32) Samoa
- Height: 1.82 m (5 ft 11 1/2 in)
- Weight: 90 kg (14 st 2 lb)

Rugby union career
- Position(s): Wing, Fullback
Senior career
Years	Team	Apps	(Points)
2014– Current	Sunnybank		
2019	Asia Pacific Dragons	4	(0)
2019−2022	Zebre	37	(15)
- Correct as of 21 May 2022
Provincial / State sides
Years	Team	Apps	(Points)
2014–2017	Brisbane City	18	(90)
2018	Manawatu	9	(25)
Super Rugby
Years	Team	Apps	(Points)
2016	Queensland Reds	6	(0)
- Correct as of 21 July 2016
International career
Years	Team	Apps	(Points)
2012	Australia 'A' Schoolboys		
National sevens team
Years	Team		Comps
2012–2013	Australia		5

Junior Laloifi (/ˌlæləˈwɪfi/ LAL-ə-WIF-ee; born 25 September 1994) is an Australian rugby union player who plays on the wing or fullback. Laloifi last played for Zebre in the Pro14 till July 2022.

Laloifi represented Victoria at the Australian Schools Rugby Championships, and was selected for the Australia 'A' Schools team in 2012. He also represented Australia in rugby sevens later that year. Laloifi joined the Sunnybank rugby club in 2013 and played in the Queensland Premier Rugby grand final in 2014.

He was selected for the Brisbane City team in the inaugural National Rugby Championship (NRC) in 2014, and went on to score the winning try in the team's grand final win over Perth at Ballymore that year. In his second season with Brisbane, Laloifi was the NRC competition's leading try scorer, claiming 14 tries in the regular season. In November 2015, Laloifi was selected as the 'Ballymore Kid' from a pool of forty eligible players in Queensland's NRC teams and signed a contract with the Queensland Reds for the 2016 Super Rugby season. In 2018 and 2019 he played in the Mitre 10 Cup for Manawatu. He played for Italian team Zebre from 2019 to 2022.
