= Reece Hewat =

South African rugby union player

- Born: 25 September 1997 (age 29) Johannesburg, Gauteng, South Africa
- Height: 194 cm (6 ft 4 in)
- Weight: 110 kg (17 st 5 lb; 240 lb)
- School: St Joseph's College, Nudgee

Rugby union career
- Position: Loose forward
Amateur team(s)
Years	Team	Apps	(Points)
2017–	Norths		
Senior career
Years	Team	Apps	(Points)
2017–	Brisbane City	6	(0)
Super Rugby
Years	Team	Apps	(Points)
2017	Reds	1	(0)
International career
Years	Team	Apps	(Points)
2015	Australian Schoolboys		
2017	Australia U20		

Reece Hewat (born 25 September 1997) is a South African-born Australian rugby union player who plays for Section Paloise in the Top 14 competition. His position of choice is loose forward.

== Biography ==
=== Start in Australia (2016-2018) ===
Originally from South Africa, Hewat spent his formative years there before relocating to Queensland, Australia. His mother is Australian, and his father is of English origin from South Africa.

His rugby journey began at St Joseph's College, Nudgee, where he honed his skills in junior rugby. Excelling in the local scene, he joined the North Brisbane Rugby Club, showcasing both skill and leadership.

In 2016, he joined the Queensland Reds, competing in Super Rugby. Under coach Nick Stiles, he made his debut for the Reds, aiming to bring fresh energy to the team after a series of disappointing performances.

Between 2016 and 2018, he played both in Super Rugby with the Queensland Reds (only featuring in one match) and with Brisbane City in the National Rugby Championship, playing six matches.

He played sparingly due to two major injuries, undergoing a double shoulder operation that kept him off the field for 9 months. Upon his return, during his first training session, he suffered a knee ligament injury, sidelining him for another 9 months. These setbacks led to him falling out of favor with the Queensland Reds coach.

As he was set to join England, his agent informed him of an opportunity to become a JIFF (player developed through the French system) in France.

Choosing between the academies of Stade Toulousain and Stade Aurillacois, he opted for the latter and made his way to Cantal. His best friend, Emmanuel Meafou chose Toulouse.

=== Arrival in France (since 2018) ===
His French journey began with Stade Aurillacois in the 2018–2019 season. While he initially played with the U20 team, he quickly transitioned to the professional squad. Despite a slow start, he became a key player for Stade Aurillacois in subsequent seasons. In the summer of 2021, he made another significant move, signing with Section Paloise in the Top 14.

Hewat's adaptation to the French rugby style took time, but by the 2022–2023 season, he had become a prominent figure in the forward pack for Section Paloise. His contributions led to a contract extension until June 2026. Notably, in January 2023, his defensive prowess was highlighted with a tackle success rate of 96%, the highest in the Top 14.

=== National team ===
Hewat's leadership qualities were evident early in his career as he captained the Australian Schoolboys rugby union team. In 2017, he played a significant role in the World Rugby U20 Championship with the Australia national under-20 rugby union team, where he served as captain, playing in 5 matches and scoring 1 try.
