= Robbie Coleman =

Australian rugby union player (born 1990)

- Born: Robert Coleman; 3 August 1990 (age 36) Queanbeyan, Australia
- Height: 1.80 m (5 ft 11 in)
- Weight: 86 kg (13 st 8 lb; 190 lb)

Rugby union career
- Position: Fullback / Wing / Centre
- Current team: NOLA Gold (U.S.A)
Senior career
Years	Team	Apps	(Points)
2014	Canberra Vikings	8	(25)
Super Rugby
Years	Team	Apps	(Points)
2010–2016	Brumbies	80	(85)
2017	Force	1	(0)
- Correct as of 22 July 2016
Medal record
Men's rugby sevens
Representing Australia
Commonwealth Games
Silver medal – second place	2010 Delhi	Team competition

Robert Coleman (born 3 August 1990) is an Australian rugby union player who plays for the NOLA Gold in Major League Rugby (MLR).

Coleman left the Brumbies after being granted a release at the end of the 2016 Super Rugby season. His playing position is either fly-half, centre or full-back. He made his Brumbies debut during the 2010 Super 14 season against the Reds in Canberra.

== Super Rugby statistics ==
As of 10 April 2017

Season	Team	Games	Starts	Sub	Mins	Tries	Cons	Pens	Drops	Points	Yel	Red
2010	Brumbies	1	0	1	3	0	0	0	0	0	0	0
2011	Brumbies	13	4	9	379	2	0	0	0	10	0	0
2012	Brumbies	11	4	7	461	2	0	0	0	10	0	0
2013	Brumbies	11	3	9	392	3	0	0	0	15	0	0
2014	Brumbies	15	15	0	1083	8	0	0	0	40	0	0
2015	Brumbies	16	15	3	1162	1	0	0	0	5	0	0
2016	Brumbies	10	8	2	623	1	0	0	0	5	0	0
2017	Western Force	1	0	1	19	0	0	0	0	0	0	0
Total		78	49	32	4122	17	0	0	0	85	0	0
