= Kelly Meafua =

Samoan rugby union player (1990–2022)

- Born: 16 October 1990 Samoa
- Died: 6 May 2022 (aged 31) Montauban, France
- Height: 188 cm (6 ft 2 in)
- Weight: 114 kg (17 st 13 lb; 251 lb)

Rugby union career
- Position: Flanker
- Current team: Montauban
Senior career
Years	Team	Apps	(Points)
2014–2015	West Harbour	14	(5)
2015	Greater Sydney Rams	6	(10)
2015–2016	Narbonne	23	(20)
2017	Greater Sydney Rams	3	(0)
2017–2018	West Harbour	15	(35)
2018–2020	Béziers	30	(45)
2020–2022	Montauban	49	(45)
National sevens team
Years	Team		Comps
2013–2014	Samoa		19

Kelly Meafua (16 October 1990 – 6 May 2022) was a Samoan rugby union player. His position of choice was flanker.

== Club career ==
Meafua moved to Auckland when he was 14 but did not start playing rugby until he joined Otahuhu at 20 years old. He played for both the Auckland under–21 and Auckland Sevens before moving to Sydney to play for West Harbour in the Shute Shield. Meafua then played for the Greater Sydney Rams and was part of the Waratahs extended training squad.

== Professional career ==
In 2013 Meafua played for the Samoa sevens team in the World Rugby Sevens Series before in 2015 he moved to France to play for Narbonne in the French Pro D2. He returned to France again in 2018, this time playing for Béziers in the Pro D2 before in 2020 he switched to Montauban.

== Personal life ==
Meafua was from the villages of Sala'ilua and Lalomauga and grew up in Samoa.

On the 6 May 2022 while celebrating Montauban final home game and a win over Narbonne, Meafua died after jumping off the Pont-Vieux bridge into the river Tarn.
