= Lewis Carmichael =

Scotland international rugby union player

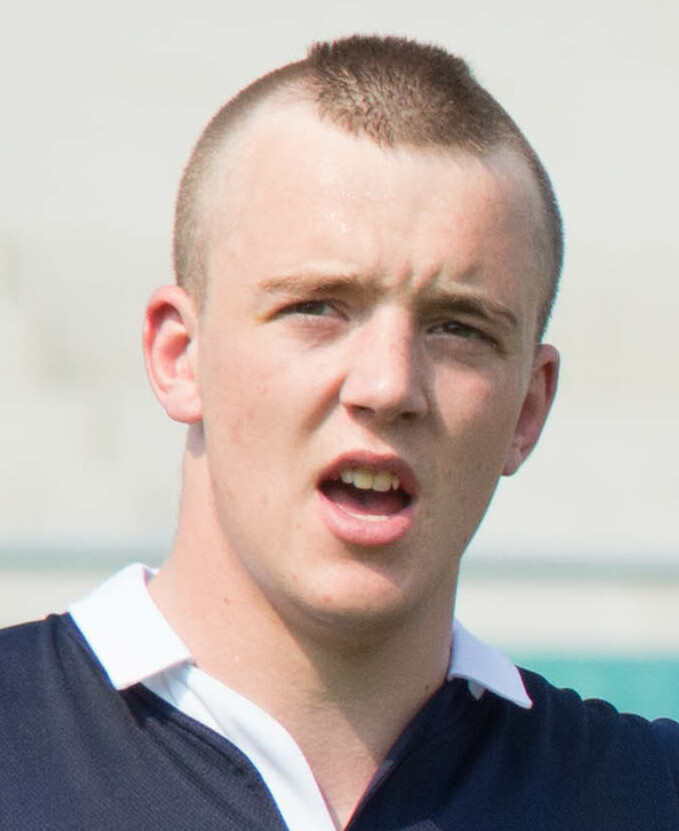
- Born: 2 May 1995 (age 31) Edinburgh, Scotland
- Height: 1.96 m (6 ft 5 in)
- Weight: 112 kg (17 st 9 lb)
- School: North Berwick High School

Rugby union career
- Position: Lock
Amateur team(s)
Years	Team	Apps	(Points)
- Melrose
Senior career
Years	Team	Apps	(Points)
2016–2021	Edinburgh	47	(15)
2017	→ Western Force (loan)	8	(0)
- Correct as of 1 June 2022
International career
Years	Team	Apps	(Points)
2013	Scotland U18		
2014–2015	Scotland U20	17	(20)
- Scotland Club XV
2018	Scotland	2	(5)
- Correct as of 1 June 2022

Lewis Carmichael (born 1995) is a former Scotland international rugby union player who last played for Edinburgh Rugby in the Pro14.

At the conclusion of the 2020–21 Pro14 season Carmichael announced his retirement from professional rugby on medical advice at the age of 26.

== Rugby Union career ==
=== Amateur career ===
He won the 2014 RBS Premiership title with Melrose.

=== Professional career ===
He played for Edinburgh Rugby in the Pro14.

=== International career ===
Carmichael received his first senior cap against Canada on the 9 June 2018. He scored a try on his debut.
