= Faalelei Sione =

Australian rugby union player

- Born: 19 February 1996 (age 30) Canberra, Australia
- Height: 1.83 m (6 ft 0 in)
- Weight: 125 kg (276 lb; 19 st 10 lb)
- School: Calwell High School
- University: University of Canberra

Rugby union career
- Position: Prop
Senior career
Years	Team	Apps	(Points)
2016–17	Canberra Vikings		
- Correct as of 21 July 2017
Provincial / State sides
Years	Team	Apps	(Points)
2018–	Manawatu	10	(10)
Super Rugby
Years	Team	Apps	(Points)
2017-	Brumbies	8	(5)
- Correct as of 21 July 2017
International career
Years	Team	Apps	(Points)
2016	Australia U20	4	(5)

Faalelei Sione (born 19 February 1996) is an Australian rugby union player who plays for Manawatu in the Mitre 10 Cup. He has also played for the Brumbies in the Super Rugby competition. His position of choice is prop.
