= Shambeckler Vui =

Australian rugby union player

- Born: 20 May 1997 (age 29) Bankstown, New South Wales, Australia
- Height: 180 cm (5 ft 11 in)
- Weight: 117 kg (18 st 6 lb; 258 lb)

Rugby union career
- Position: Prop
Senior career
Years	Team	Apps	(Points)
2016–2017	Perth Spirit	14	(11)
2018–2019	Sydney Rays	12	(25)
2021	Mitsubishi Dynaboars	3	(5)
- Correct as of 21 February 2021
Super Rugby
Years	Team	Apps	(Points)
2017	Force	6	(0)
2018–2019	Waratahs	3	(0)
2020	Brumbies	0	(0)
International career
Years	Team	Apps	(Points)
2014	Australian Schoolboys	2	(5)
2016-2017	Australia U-20	12	

Shambeckler Vui is an Australian rugby union player who plays as a Prop for the Super Rugby team the Waratahs. He has also represented Australia in the under 20s team.

== Super Rugby statistics ==
As of 23 November 2017

Season	Team	Games	Starts	Sub	Mins	Tries	Cons	Pens	Drops	Points	Yel	Red
2017	Force	6	0	6	80	0	0	0	0	0	0	0
Total		6	0	6	80	0	0	0	0	0	0	0
