= Harley Fox =

Australian rugby union player

- Born: 13 January 1996 (age 30) Ipswich, Queensland, Australia
- Height: 1.86 m (6 ft 1 in)
- Weight: 115 kg (18 st 2 lb)
- School: St Edmund's College, Ipswich; Anglican Church Grammar School

Rugby union career
- Position: Flanker
- Current team: Connacht
Provincial / State sides
Years	Team	Apps	(Points)
2016–2017	Melbourne Rebels Rising	5	(5)
2017–2018	Connacht	2	(0)
- Correct as of 11 Sept 2017

Harley Fox (born 13 January 1996) is an Australian rugby union player. He has played in the blindside flanker and number 8 positions for the Queensland Reds and Melbourne Rebels in the Super Rugby competitions and for Irish club Connacht in the European United Rugby Championship competition.

== Early life ==
Fox grew up in Ipswich, Queensland playing rugby league for the local Brothers club as a junior and attending primary school at Raceview State School. Fox represented Queensland in both rugby league and rugby union at under 16 and under 18 age levels.

Fox attended St Edmund’s College in Ipswich, where he played a variety of sports, including cricket and baseball. Fox transferred to Anglican Church Grammar School in Brisbane to take up a rugby union scholarship, where he was coached and mentored by future Queensland Reds under 20s coach Jason Gilmore. In September 2014, he was named captain of the Australian Schoolboys team, with the rapidity of his success in switching codes being described as "remarkable". He led the Australian Schholboys team on tour to Wellington, New Zealand in September and October 2014, which featured a 50–15 win over the Fiji Schoolboys team.

== Professional career ==
=== Queensland Reds ===
Fox received a contract for the Queensland Reds and the Australian Rugby Union under-20 program for the 2015 season. He was named in the Queensland under-20 representative squad for the national championships in March 2015.

=== Melbourne Rebels ===
In October 2015, Fox was signed by the Melbourne Rebels to their extended squad for the 2016 Super Rugby season.

=== Connacht Rugby ===
In September 2017, Irish Pro14 side Connacht announced that Fox would be joining its three-year academy program ahead of the 2017–18 season. Fox was not an Irish national, but having signed ahead of changes to the World Rugby regulations around international qualification, which come into effect in the 2018–19 season, Fox would be eligible to represent Ireland after three years of residency.

== Super Rugby Statistics ==
As of 6 November 2017

Season	Team	Games	Starts	Sub	Mins	Tries	Cons	Pens	Drops	Points	Yel	Red
2016	Rebels	0	0	0	0	0	0	0	0	0	0	0
2017	Rebels	0	0	0	0	0	0	0	0	0	0	0
Total		0	0	0	0	0	0	0	0	0	0	0
