= Michael Gunn =

- Born: 16 June 1995 (age 31) Brisbane, Australia
- Height: 1.89 m (6 ft 2 in)
- Weight: 96 kg (15 st 2 lb; 212 lb)
- School: Anglican Church Grammar School

Rugby union career
- Position: Loose forward
- Current team: Brisbane City / Reds
Senior career
Years	Team	Apps	(Points)
2014–	Brisbane City	20	(10)
2015–	Reds	8	(0)
- Correct as of 21 July 2016
International career
Years	Team	Apps	(Points)
2012	Australian Schoolboys	4	
- Correct as of 13 November 2015

Michael Gunn (born 16 June 1995) is an Australian rugby union player who currently plays as a loose forward for the Queensland Reds in the international Super Rugby competition. Domestically he has also turned out for Brisbane City in the National Rugby Championship.

Gunn represented Queensland Schoolboys before being capped at national schoolboy level in 2012. He has also appeared for the Reds Under-20 and A sides and locally he plays for Easts Tigers in the Queensland Premier Rugby competition.
