= Albert Nikoro =

- Full name: Albert Norman Tamatoa Nikoro
- Born: 7 August 1992 (age 34) Auckland, New Zealand
- Height: 184 cm (6 ft 0 in)
- Weight: 95 kg (209 lb; 14 st 13 lb)
- School: Mount Albert Grammar School

Rugby union career
- Position(s): Wing, Fullback
Senior career
Years	Team	Apps	(Points)
2012–2014	Blues	5	(3)
2012–2013	Auckland	0	(0)
2012	Tasman	8	(11)
2014	Waikato	5	(3)
2015–2016	Force	3	(0)
2015	Perth Spirit	6	(23)
2016	Greater Sydney Rams	7	(6)
2017	Counties Manukau	6	(10)
- Correct as of 19 April 2019
International career
Years	Team	Apps	(Points)
2016–2017	Samoa	6	(0)
- Correct as of 19 April 2019

Albert Norman Tamatoa Nikoro (born 7 August 1992) is a New Zealand-born Samoan rugby union player who last played as a wing for the Western Force in Super Rugby and for Perth Spirit in Australia's National Rugby Championship. He represents Manu Samoa internationally.

He previously played for the Auckland Blues in Super Rugby and for Mitre 10 Cup teams Auckland and the Tasman Makos in New Zealand.

Nikoro made his Super Rugby debut for the Blues in the final game of the 2012 Super Rugby season and was subsequently named in the team's Wider Training Squad for the 2013 Super Rugby season.

== Early years ==
Nikoro made the Mount Albert Grammar School 1st XV in 2007 in his second year in high school where he scored a try on his debut as a 14-year-old. That year the 1st XV won the Auckland Secondary Schools 1st XV competition and were runners up in the New Zealand Secondary Schools Top 4 competition. Nikoro also featured in the schools back to back Auckland Secondary Schools 1st XV championships in 2009 and also in 2010 where the school also won the New Zealand Secondary Schools Top 4 competition.

His family includes his dad, Stan, a police officer, his mother, a flight attendant and 2 sisters, Estee and Lausapai.

== Super Rugby statistics ==
As of 20 July 2016

Season	Team	Games	Starts	Sub	Mins	Tries	Cons	Pens	Drops	Points	Yel	Red
2012	Blues	1	0	1	2	0	0	0	0	0	0	0
2013	Blues	3	1	2	81	0	0	1	0	3	0	0
2014	Blues	1	0	1	19	0	0	0	0	0	0	0
2015	Force	0	0	0	0	0	0	0	0	0	0	0
2016	Force	3	0	3	73	0	0	0	0	0	0	0
Total		8	1	7	175	0	0	1	0	3	0	0
