= Tom Moloney (rugby union) =

Australian rugby union player

- Born: Tom Moloney; 4 March 1994 (age 32) Australia
- Height: 1.89 m (6 ft 2 1/2 in)
- Weight: 117 kg (18 st 6 lb)

Rugby union career
- Position: Prop
Senior career
Years	Team	Apps	(Points)
2015−2017	Melbourne Rising	20	(0)
2018–	Panasonic Wild Knights	1	(0)
- Correct as of 8 February 2019
Super Rugby
Years	Team	Apps	(Points)
2016−2018	Rebels	7	(0)
- Correct as of 5 November 2017

Tom Moloney is an Australian professional rugby union player for the Melbourne Rebels in Super Rugby. His position is prop.

== Career ==
He made his debut for the Rebels against the Bulls in a 45–25 defeat at Loftus Versfeld Stadium coming on as a replacement for Toby Smith in the 78th minute of the match. He went on to make a further 3 substitute appearances for the Rebels that season against the Hurricanes, Western Force and the Stormers.

== Super Rugby statistics ==
As of 15 July 2018

Season	Team	Games	Starts	Sub	Mins	Tries	Cons	Pens	Drops	Points	Yel	Red
2016	Rebels	3	0	3	15	0	0	0	0	0	0	0
2017	Rebels	4	0	4	44	0	0	0	0	0	0	0
2018	Rebels	0	0	0	0	0	0	0	0	0	0	0
Total		7	0	7	59	0	0	0	0	0	0	0
