= Ben Matwijow =

- Born: 14 February 1990 (age 36) Sydney, Australia
- Height: 1.98 m (6 ft 6 in)
- Weight: 112 kg (17 st 9 lb; 247 lb)
- School: Westfields Sports High School

Rugby union career
- Position: Lock
- Current team: Force / Taranaki
Amateur team(s)
Years	Team	Apps	(Points)
2012−15	Northern Suburbs	54	(85)
Senior career
Years	Team	Apps	(Points)
2014	NSW Country Eagles	9	(0)
2015	Canterbury	11	(0)
2016	Reds	11	(0)
2016−	Taranaki	10	(10)
2017−18	Force		
- Correct as of 24 July 2021

Ben Matwijow (born 14 February 1990) is a retired Australian rugby union lock formerly contracted to Australian franchise, the Western Force in the international Super Rugby competition and the Taranaki Bulls in New Zealand's Mitre 10 Cup.

== Provincial career ==
Educated at Westfields Sports High School in the suburbs of Sydney, Matwijow first made a name for himself playing for the Northern Suburbs Rugby Club in the Shute Shield between 2012 and 2015. During that time he was called up to the NSW Country Eagles squad ahead of the inaugural National Rugby Championship in 2014. He played 9 times for the Country Eagles during the campaign, however that was to be his only season with them as he hopped across the Tasman Sea to play in New Zealand in 2015. It proved to be a successful switch as Matwijow played a key role in his side, Canterbury's, ITM Cup victory. He would again be on the move in 2016, heading to New Zealand's North Island to link up with Taranaki.

== Super Rugby career ==
Matwijow's domestic performances with Northern Suburbs brought him to the attention of Australia's Super Rugby franchises, however, despite training with the Rebels in 2012 and the Force in 2013, no contract offer was forthcoming. In fact he had to wait until 2016 before he earned his first Super Rugby cap. An injury to the Reds' Wallaby international Kane Douglas in the 2015 Rugby World Cup final opened up a space on their roster and Matwijow was selected to fill it. He made 11 appearances in his debut campaign, but Douglas' return to fitness towards the end of the year meant that Matwijow was on the move again, this time heading west to join the Western Force ahead of the 2017 season.

== Super Rugby statistics ==
As of 14 August 2016

Season	Team	Games	Starts	Sub	Mins	Tries	Cons	Pens	Drops	Points	Yel	Red
2016	Reds	11	5	6	455	0	0	0	0	0	0	0
Total		11	5	6	455	0	0	0	0	0	0	0
