= Ben Meehan =

Australian rugby union player

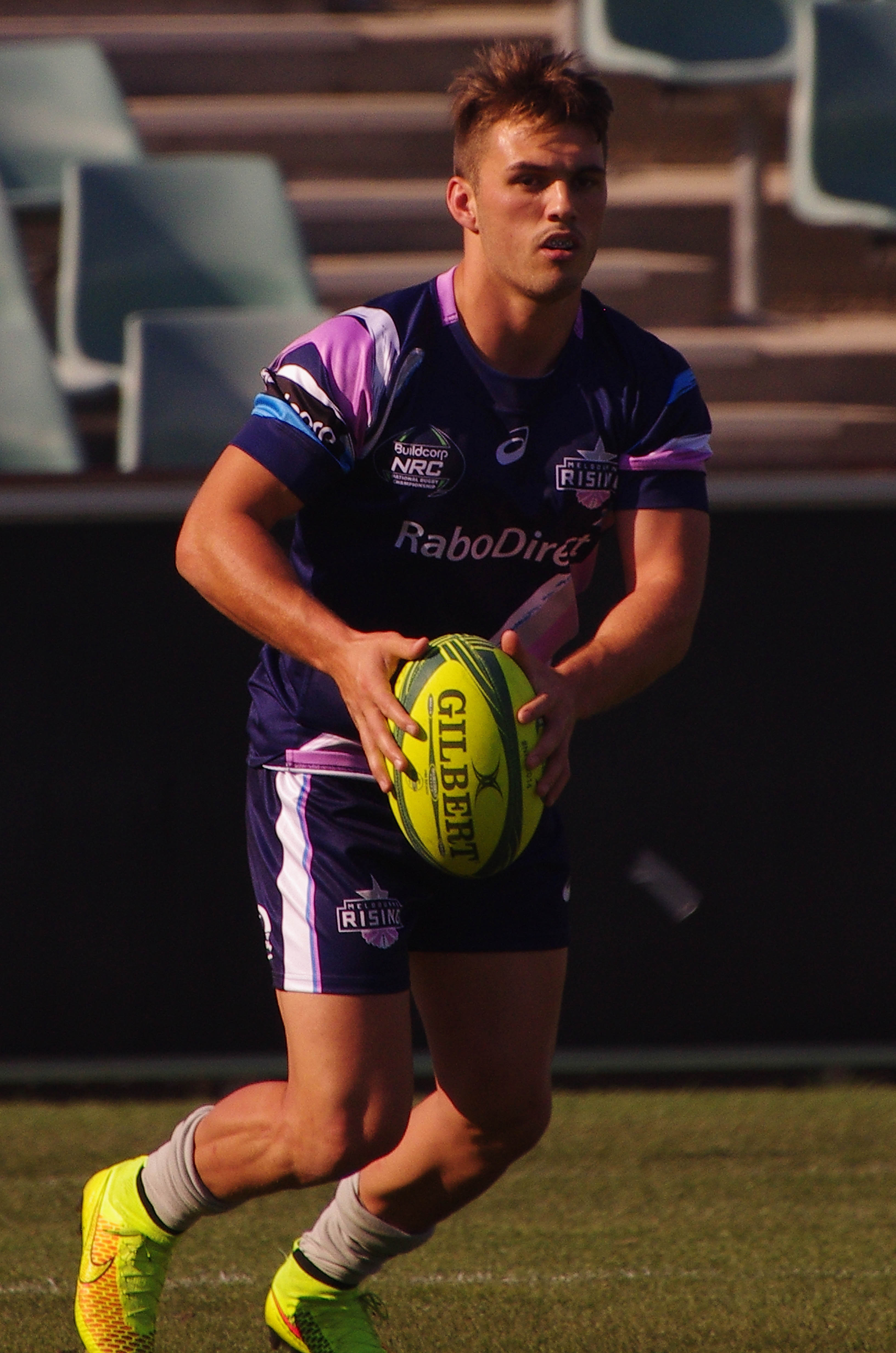
- Meehan in 2014
- Full name: Ben Peter Meehan
- Born: 21 January 1993 (age 33) Brisbane, Australia
- Height: 1.78 m (5 ft 10 in)
- Weight: 86 kg (13 st 8 lb; 190 lb)
- School: Brisbane State High

Rugby union career
- Position: Scrum-half
- Current team: Gloucester Rugby
Youth career
- 2012: Melbourne Storm
- 2013: Reds Academy
Senior career
Years	Team	Apps	(Points)
2014–2017	Rebels	38	(22)
2014−2017	Melbourne Rising	17	(65)
2017−2021	London Irish	58	(45)
2021-2023	Gloucester	45	(15)
- Correct as of 30 December 2017
International career
Years	Team	Apps	(Points)
2013	Australia Under-20	4	(0)
- Correct as of 4 December 2014

Ben Meehan (born 21 January 1993) is a former Australian rugby union player. He last played as a scrum-half for Gloucester in Premiership Rugby.

== Early life and career ==
Meehan had a strong youth rugby pedigree, representing his home state of Queensland at a number of age-levels and this eventually ended in him being handed a place in the Queensland Reds academy for 2013. He picked up some invaluable experience in his year there, including an appearance against Junior Japan in the 2013 IRB Pacific Rugby Cup. During this time he also played Club Rugby for Sunnybank in the Queensland Premier Rugby competition and had a brief spell in rugby league with the Melbourne Storm where he was a regular with the club's under 20s.

He was handed his big break ahead of the 2014 Super Rugby season when he was named as a member of the Melbourne Rebels extended playing squad. He made his Super Rugby debut during the Rebels first match of the season against the Cheetahs on 28 February 2014, replacing Luke Burgess in the 74th minute in a 35–14 win for his side.

On 1 June 2017, it was announced that he had signed for English Premiership side London Irish. Meehan is an England-qualified player through grandparents from Yorkshire. He left London Irish for personal reasons on 27 April 2021.

On 16 July 2021, Meehan returns to the Premiership Rugby competition with Gloucester from the 2021–22 season

== International career ==
Meehan was a member of the Australia Under-20 side which competed in the 2013 IRB Junior World Championship in France.

== Super Rugby statistics ==
As of 21 July 2016

Season	Team	Games	Starts	Sub	Mins	Tries	Cons	Pens	Drops	Points	Yel	Red
2014	Rebels	7	2	5	197	0	0	0	0	0	0	0
2015	Rebels	1	0	1	9	0	0	0	0	0	0	0
2016	Rebels	15	6	9	611	4	0	0	0	20	0	0
2017	Rebels	10	3	7	396	0	1	0	0	2	0	0
Total		33	11	22	1213	4	1	0	0	22	0	0
