= Dennis Pili-Gaitau =

- Born: 28 June 1988 (age 38) New Zealand
- Height: 177 cm (5 ft 10 in)
- Weight: 91 kg (14 st 5 lb; 201 lb)

Rugby union career
- Position: Fly-half / Centre
Senior career
Years	Team	Apps	(Points)
2014	North Harbour	1	(0)
2015–2016	Sydney Rays	8	(5)
2017	Greater Sydney Rams	8	(20)
2018–	Carcassonne	18	(5)
Super Rugby
Years	Team	Apps	(Points)
2017	Rebels	0	(0)

Dennis Pili-Gaitau (born 28 June 1989) is a New Zealand rugby union player who played for the Rebels in the Super Rugby competition. His position of choice is fly-half or centre.
