= Maclean Jones =

Australian rugby union player

- Born: 12 June 1996 (age 30) Australia
- Height: 186 cm (6 ft 1 in)
- Weight: 101 kg (15 st 13 lb; 223 lb)

Rugby union career
- Position(s): Number Eight; Blindside Flanker
Amateur team(s)
Years	Team	Apps	(Points)
2016–2019	Warringah Rats	34	(5)
Senior career
Years	Team	Apps	(Points)
2015–2016	Queensland Country	13	(10)
2017–2019	NSW Country Eagles	12	(10)
2018	Sydney Rays	3	(0)
2021–2022	Austin Gilgronis	22	(10)
2023–present	Chicago Hounds	15	(15)
Super Rugby
Years	Team	Apps	(Points)
2017	Waratahs	1	(0)

Maclean Jones (born 12 June 1996) is an Australian rugby union player who plays as a number 7 for the Chicago Hounds in Major League Rugby (MLR). Jones also serves as head coach for Loyola University Chicago Men's Rugby.

He previously played for the Austin Gilgronis in the MLR.

== Honours ==
Chicago Hounds

- All Major League Rugby Second team (2025)
