= Isaac Thompson =

NZ rugby union player

- Born: 2 July 1987 (age 39) Palmerston North, New Zealand
- Height: 183 cm (6 ft 0 in)
- Weight: 93 kg (205 lb; 14 st 9 lb)
- School: Palmerston North Boys' High School
- Notable relative: Rob Thompson (brother)

Rugby union career
- Position(s): First five-eighth, Centre
- Current team: Tuggeranong Vikings
Senior career
Years	Team	Apps	(Points)
2008–2011	Manawatu	30	(134)
2014–2016	Canberra Vikings	20	(92)
2017	Brumbies	1	(2)
2017	Mazda Blue Zoomers	5	(11)
- Correct as of 16 December 2017

Isaac Thompson (born 2 July 1987) is a New Zealand rugby union player. His position of choice is fly-half. He made his debut for the Brumbies in Super Rugby during the 2017 season.

Thompson was educated at Palmerston North Boys' High School and signed for the Manawatu Turbos in 2008 where he totaled 30 games in the National Provincial Championship, scoring 134 points.

His younger brother, Rob, currently plays for the Highlanders in Super Rugby.
