= Senio Toleafoa =

- Born: 26 August 1993 (age 33) Sydney, Australia
- Height: 197 cm (6 ft 6 in)
- Weight: 129 kg (20 st 4 lb; 284 lb)

Rugby union career
- Position: Lock
- Current team: Greater Sydney Rams
Senior career
Years	Team	Apps	(Points)
2014–	Western Sydney Rams	4	(10)
Super Rugby
Years	Team	Apps	(Points)
2017	Waratahs	3	(0)
International career
Years	Team	Apps	(Points)
2013	Samoa U-20	1	(0)
2013	Australia U-20	1	(0)
2019-	Samoa	6	(0)

Senio Toleafoa (born 26 August 1993) is an Australian rugby union player who plays for the Waratahs in the Super Rugby competition. His position of choice is lock. He has also represented Samoa and Australia in their national under-20s teams.

On 23 August 2019, he was named in Samoa's 34-man training squad for the 2019 Rugby World Cup, before being named in the final 31 on 31 August.
