= Onehunga Havili =

Tongan rugby union player

- Born: 16 February 1996 (age 30) Tonga
- Height: 195 cm (6 ft 5 in)
- Weight: 113 kg (17 st 11 lb; 249 lb)

Rugby union career
- Position: Lock
- Current team: Queensland Country; Utah Warriors
Senior career
| Years | Team | Apps | (Points) |
| 2016– | Perth Spirit | 1 | (0) |
| 2022– | Aurillac | | |
| 2023– | Utah Warriors | | |
- Correct as of March 27, 2023
Super Rugby
| Years | Team | Apps | (Points) |
| 2017– | Force | 0 | (0) |
International career
| Years | Team | Apps | (Points) |
| 2017– | Tonga | 2 | (0) |

Onehunga Havili (born 16 February 1996) is a Tongan-born rugby union player who currently plays for the French Rugby Pro D2 club, Aurillac. He also plays for the Utah Warriors of Major League Rugby (MLR) in the U.S.

Havili toured New Zealand with a Tongan under-14 side, and was recruited by Sacred Heart College, Auckland. He then played for the Blues under-18s before moving to Australia to join Perth's Future Force academy.

In 2017 he was selected for the Tongan rugby squad.
