= Liam Gill (rugby union) =

Australian rugby union player

- Born: Liam Bradley Gill; 8 June 1992 (age 34) Melbourne, Victoria, Australia
- Height: 1.85 m (6 ft 1 in)
- Weight: 100 kg (16 st; 220 lb)
- School: St Joseph's College, Gregory Terrace

Rugby union career
- Position(s): Flanker, Number 8
- Current team: Ricoh Black Rams
Senior career
Years	Team	Apps	(Points)
2014–15	Brisbane City	13	(40)
2016–17	Toulon	29	(35)
2017–2020	Lyon	60	(110)
2021–2024	NTT Shining Arcs	30	(50)
2024–	Ricoh Black Rams	30	(65)
- Correct as of 21 February 2021
Super Rugby
Years	Team	Apps	(Points)
2011–16	Reds	76	(53)
- Correct as of 21 July 2016
International career
Years	Team	Apps	(Points)
2009	Australia Schools	6	
2010–12	Australia U20	9	(10)
2012–	Australia	15	(0)
- Correct as of 17 November 2013
National sevens team
Years	Team		Comps
2009–14	Australia		1
Medal record
Men's rugby sevens
Representing Australia
Commonwealth Games
Silver medal – second place	2010 Delhi	Team competition

Liam Bradley Gill (born 8 June 1992) is a professional rugby union player for Lyon. He was born in Melbourne and lived in the United States before playing junior Rugby in Adelaide for the Old Collegians. His regular playing position is Flanker.

Gill attended St. Joseph's College, Gregory Terrace, a private school in Brisbane. He was not only captain of the First XV in 2009 but also school vice-captain.

In 2010, he became the youngest ever to player to compete in the IRB Junior World Championship during which his Australian side lost to New Zealand in the final. He was a member of the Australia U20s team that competed in the 2011 IRB Junior World Championship, along with fellow Queenslanders: Joel Faulkner, Tevita Kuridrani, Matt Lucas, Simon Morahan, Eddie Quirk, Siliva Siliva, Dom Shipperley, and Kimami Sitauti. He was named captain of the Australia U20s side that competed in the 2012 IRB Junior World Championship.

In 2012, Gill made his debut for the Australian Rugby Team, the 'Wallabies'. As well as being that year's Australian Under-20 captain, Gill became the 861st player to have represented Australia.
