= Markus Vanzati =

- Born: 21 September 1994 (age 32) Järvsö, Sweden
- Height: 188 cm (6 ft 2 in)
- Weight: 118 kg (18 st 8 lb; 260 lb)
- School: Toowoomba Grammar School

Rugby union career
- Position: Prop
- Current team: Western Force
Amateur team(s)
| Years | Team | Apps | (Points) |
| 2015 | Souths | 17 | (15) |
Senior career
| Years | Team | Apps | (Points) |
| 2015–2017 | Brisbane City | 14 | (0) |
| 2018–pres. | Western Force | 1 | (0) |
Super Rugby
| Years | Team | Apps | (Points) |
| 2017–2018 | Queensland Reds | 5 | (0) |

Markus Vanzati (born 21 September 1994) is a Swedish-born Australian rugby player who currently plays for the Western Force. His position is prop. Vanzati is the first Swedish-born professional rugby player.

== Early life ==
Vanzati was born in 1994 in Järvsö. A small town situated in the north Swedish province of Hälsingland to a Swedish mother, Louise and an Australian father, Paul. Vanzati moved from Järvsö, Sweden to Strathalbyn, South Australia when he was younger before moving to Brisbane, Queensland. Vanzati played Australian football before switching codes to rugby as he was too often penalised.

== Rugby career ==
=== Queensland Reds ===
Vanzati had a breakout year in 2017, earning his Super Rugby debut and five caps for the Queensland Reds after he joined the team following his previous seasons performances with both Souths in the Queensland premier rugby and Brisbane City of the NRC. On 11 March 2017 Vanzati made his debut for the Reds against the Crusaders in round 3. Replacing Stephen Moore, playing 16 minutes, and losing the game 20–22 at Suncorp Stadium, Brisbane.

=== Western Force ===
After some interest shown by English premiership side Leicester Tigers, Vanzati moved to Perth, Western Australia to join the Western Force. Vanzati was selected to represent the Force at the World Club 10s at Mauritius in June 2018.
