= De Wet Roos =

South African rugby union player/referee

- Born: 10 June 1990 (age 36) South Africa
- Height: 1.68 m (5 ft 6 in)
- Weight: 75 kg (165 lb; 11 st 11 lb)
- Occupation(s): Rugby union player Rugby referee

Rugby union career
- Position: Scrum-half
Amateur team(s)
Years	Team	Apps	(Points)
2013-2019	Southern Districts	60	(119)
Senior career
Years	Team	Apps	(Points)
2015	Greater Sydney Rams	8	(9)
2016	Sydney Rays	8	(12)
2019	NSW Country Eagles	1	(0)
2020-2021	Houston SaberCats	5	(10)
- Correct as of 11 December 2019
Super Rugby
Years	Team	Apps	(Points)
2017	Brumbies	10	(0)
International career
Years	Team	Apps	(Points)
2015	Australian Barbarians	2	(0)

De Wet Roos (born 10 June 1990) is a South African-born Australian Rugby Union player for the Houston SaberCats in Major League Rugby (MLR). He currently is a referee for USA Rugby high performance referees and referees MLR matches.

He previously played for the Brumbies in the Super Rugby competition. His position of choice is scrum-half.
