= List of 2018–19 Super Rugby transfers (Australia) =

This is a list of player movements for Super Rugby teams prior to the end of the 2019 Super Rugby season. Departure and arrivals of all players that were included in a Super Rugby squad for 2018 or 2019 are listed here, regardless of when it occurred. Future-dated transfers are only included if confirmed by the player or his agent, his former team or his new team.

== Brumbies ==
Brumbies transfers 2018–2019
Pos	2018 squad	Out	In	2019 squad
PR	Allan Alaalatoa; Ben Alexander; Mees Erasmus (extended playing squad); Leslie Leulua’iali’i-Makin; Nic Mayhew; Scott Sio; Faalelei Sione	(substituted off) Ben Alexander (retired); (substituted off) Mees Erasmus (to Rebels); (substituted off) Nic Mayhew (to (New Zealand) North Harbour); (substituted off) Faalelei Sione (to (New Zealand) Manawatu)	(substituted in) Vunipola Fifita (from Canberra Vikings); (substituted in) Tom Ross (from Canberra Vikings); (substituted in) James Slipper (from Reds); (substituted in) Angus Wagner (from Canberra Vikings)	Allan Alaalatoa; Vunipola Fifita; Leslie Leulua’iali’i-Makin; Tom Ross; Scott Sio; James Slipper; Angus Wagner (short-term, did not play)
HK	Robbie Abel; Folau Fainga'a (extended playing squad); Joshua Mann-Rea; Connal McInerney (short-term)	(substituted off) Robbie Abel (to Rebels)	(substituted in) Maile Ngauamo (from Brisbane City)	Folau Fainga'a; Joshua Mann-Rea; Connal McInerney; Maile Ngauamo (short-term, did not play)
LK	Richie Arnold; Rory Arnold; Sam Carter; Blake Enever; Darcy Swain (extended playing squad)	(substituted off) Richie Arnold (to (Japan) Yamaha Júbilo)	(substituted in) Murray Douglas (from (New Zealand) Hurricanes)	Rory Arnold; Sam Carter; Murray Douglas; Blake Enever; Darcy Swain
FL	Tom Cusack; Lachlan McCaffrey; Michael Oakman-Hunt (short-term); David Pocock; Rob Valetini	(substituted off) Michael Oakman-Hunt (returned to Canberra Vikings)	(substituted in) Jahrome Brown (from (New Zealand) Waikato); (substituted in) Pete Samu (from (New Zealand) Crusaders)	Jahrome Brown (short-term); Tom Cusack; Lachlan McCaffrey; David Pocock; Pete Samu; Rob Valetini
N8	Lolo Fakaosilea; Ben Hyne (did not play); Isi Naisarani	(substituted off) Lolo Fakaosilea (to (Japan) Kintetsu Liners); (substituted off) Isi Naisarani (to Rebels)		Ben Hyne (did not play)
SH	Ryan Lonergan (extended playing squad, did not play); Matt Lucas; Joe Powell			Ryan Lonergan; Matt Lucas; Joe Powell
FH	Wharenui Hawera; Christian Lealiifano		(substituted in) Bayley Kuenzle (from Southern Districts)	Wharenui Hawera; Bayley Kuenzle (did not play); Christian Lealiifano
CE	Kyle Godwin; Jordan Jackson-Hope; Tevita Kuridrani; Andrew Smith	(substituted off) Kyle Godwin (to (Ireland) Connacht); (substituted off) Andrew Smith (retired)	(substituted in) Len Ikitau (from Canberra Vikings); (substituted in) Noah Lolesio (from Canberra Vikings); (substituted in) Irae Simone (from Waratahs); (substituted in) Tom Wright (from Manly Warringah Sea Eagles)	Len Ikitau; Jordan Jackson-Hope; Tevita Kuridrani; Noah Lolesio (did not play); Irae Simone; Tom Wright
WG	James Dargaville; Andy Muirhead (extended playing squad); Chance Peni; Henry Speight; Lausii Taliauli	(substituted off) James Dargaville (to (New Zealand) North Harbour)	(substituted in) Toni Pulu (from (New Zealand) Chiefs)	Andy Muirhead; Chance Peni; Toni Pulu; Henry Speight; Lausii Taliauli
FB	Tom Banks; Mack Hansen (did not play); James Verity-Amm (extended playing squad)	(substituted off) James Verity-Amm (released)		Tom Banks; Mack Hansen
Coach	Dan McKellar			Dan McKellar

== Rebels ==
Rebels transfers 2018–2019
Pos	2018 squad	Out	In	2019 squad
PR	Jermaine Ainsley; Ben Daley; Pone Fa'amausili (supplementary squad); Tetera Faulkner; Tom Moloney (did not play); Fereti Sa'aga; Sam Talakai; Laurie Weeks (did not play)	(substituted off) Tom Moloney (to (Japan) Panasonic Wild Knights); (substituted off) Laurie Weeks (retired)	(substituted in) Mees Erasmus (from Brumbies); (substituted in) Matt Gibbon (from NSW Country Eagles)	Jermaine Ainsley; Ben Daley (did not play); Mees Erasmus (did not play); Pone Fa'amausili; Tetera Faulkner; Matt Gibbon (development squad); Fereti Sa'aga (did not play); Sam Talakai
HK	Nathan Charles (short-term); Sama Malolo (supplementary squad); Anaru Rangi; Jordan Uelese; Mahe Vailanu (short-term)	(substituted off) Nathan Charles (released); (substituted off) Sama Malolo (to (Japan) Suntory Sungoliath); (substituted off) Mahe Vailanu (to (Japan) Panasonic Wild Knights)	(substituted in) Robbie Abel (from Brumbies); (substituted in) Hugh Roach (from Waratahs)	Robbie Abel; Anaru Rangi; Hugh Roach; Jordan Uelese
LK	Adam Coleman; Sam Jeffries; Geoff Parling; Matt Philip	(substituted off) Geoff Parling (retired)	(substituted in) Esei Ha'angana (from supplementary squad); (substituted in) Trevor Hosea (from supplementary squad)	Adam Coleman; Esei Ha'angana; Trevor Hosea (did not play); Sam Jeffries; Matt Philip
FL	Angus Cottrell; Colby Fainga'a; Richard Hardwick; Ross Haylett-Petty; Rob Leota (did not play)	(substituted off) Colby Fainga'a (to (Ireland) Connacht)	(substituted in) Luke Jones (from (France) Bordeaux); (substituted in) Brad Wilkin (from Waratahs)	Angus Cottrell; Richard Hardwick; Ross Haylett-Petty; Luke Jones; Rob Leota; Brad Wilkin
N8	Amanaki Mafi; Lopeti Timani	(substituted off) Lopeti Timani (to (France) La Rochelle); (substituted off) Amanaki Mafi (to (Japan) Sunwolves)	(substituted in) Isi Naisarani (from Brumbies)	Isi Naisarani
SH	Will Genia; Harrison Goddard; Michael Ruru			Will Genia; Harrison Goddard; Michael Ruru
FH	Tayler Adams; Jack Debreczeni (supplementary squad); Jack McGregor (did not play)	(substituted off) Tayler Adams (to (New Zealand) Southland); (substituted off) Jack Debreczeni (to (New Zealand) Chiefs); (substituted off) Jack McGregor (to Force)	(substituted in) Quade Cooper (from Reds); (substituted in) Stuart Dunbar (from Sydney University); (substituted in) Matt To'omua (from (England) Leicester Tigers)	Quade Cooper; Stuart Dunbar (development squad); Matt To'omua (short-term)
CE	Reece Hodge; David Horwitz (did not play); Bill Meakes; Sione Tuipulotu (did not play); Semisi Tupou	(substituted off) David Horwitz (to (Ireland) Connacht)		Reece Hodge; Bill Meakes; Sione Tuipulotu; Semisi Tupou
WG	Tom English; Henry Hutchison (did not play); Marika Koroibete; Sefa Naivalu	(substituted off) Henry Hutchison (to Australia Sevens); (substituted off) Sefa Naivalu (to Reds)	(substituted in) Campbell Magnay (from (Japan) Suntory Sungoliath)	Tom English; Marika Koroibete; Campbell Magnay
FB	Dane Haylett-Petty; Jack Maddocks			Dane Haylett-Petty; Jack Maddocks
Coach	David Wessels			David Wessels

== Reds ==
Reds transfers 2018–2019
Pos	2018 squad	Out	In	2019 squad
PR	Sef Fa'agase; Harry Hoopert; James Slipper; JP Smith; Ruan Smith; Taniela Tupou; Markus Vanzati (did not play)	(substituted off) Sef Fa'agase (to (New Zealand) Highlanders); (substituted off) James Slipper (to Brumbies); (substituted off) Markus Vanzati (to Force)	(substituted in) Feao Fotuaika (from Brisbane City); (substituted in) Gavin Luka (from Bond University)	Feao Fotuaika; Harry Hoopert; Gavin Luka; JP Smith; Ruan Smith; Taniela Tupou
HK	Alex Mafi; Brandon Paenga-Amosa; Andrew Ready	(substituted off) Andrew Ready (to (New Zealand) Southland)	(substituted in) Efi Ma'afu (from Queensland Country)	Efi Ma'afu (did not play); Alex Mafi; Brandon Paenga-Amosa
LK	Angus Blyth; Kane Douglas; Harry Hockings; Izack Rodda; Lukhan Salakaia-Loto	(substituted off) Kane Douglas (to (France) Bordeaux)		Angus Blyth; Harry Hockings; Izack Rodda; Lukhan Salakaia-Loto
FL	Michael Gunn (did not play); Reece Hewat (did not play); Adam Korczyk; Angus Scott-Young; George Smith; Caleb Timu; Liam Wright	(substituted off) Michael Gunn (to Brisbane City); (substituted off) Reece Hewat (to Brisbane City); (substituted off) George Smith (to (England) Bristol Bears)	(substituted in) Fraser McReight (from Brisbane City); (substituted in) Harry Wilson (from Queensland Country)	Adam Korczyk; Fraser McReight; Angus Scott-Young; Caleb Timu; Harry Wilson (did not play); Liam Wright
N8	Scott Higginbotham			Scott Higginbotham
SH	Tate McDermott; Moses Sorovi; James Tuttle		(substituted in) Scott Malolua (from Queensland Country)	Scott Malolua (short-term); Tate McDermott; Moses Sorovi; James Tuttle (did not play)
FH	Quade Cooper (did not play); Jono Lance; Ben Lucas; Hamish Stewart; Teti Tela	(substituted off) Quade Cooper (to Rebels); (substituted off) Jono Lance (to (England) Worcester Warriors); (substituted off) Ben Lucas (to (France) Grenoble)	(substituted in) Matt McGahan (from (Japan) Yamaha Júbilo)	Matt McGahan; Hamish Stewart; Teti Tela (did not play)
CE	Chris Feauai-Sautia; Samu Kerevi; Duncan Paia'aua		(substituted in) Isaac Lucas (from Brisbane City); (substituted in) Seb Wileman (from NSW Country Eagles)	Chris Feauai-Sautia; Samu Kerevi; Isaac Lucas (short-term); Duncan Paia'aua; Seb Wileman (short-term)
WG	Filipo Daugunu; Lachlan Maranta (did not play); Eto Nabuli; Jayden Ngamanu (short-term); Izaia Perese; Jordan Petaia (short-term)	(substituted off) Lachlan Maranta (to Brisbane City); (substituted off) Eto Nabuli (to (France) Bordeaux); (substituted off) Jayden Ngamanu (to Brisbane City); (substituted off) Izaia Perese (to Redcliffe Dolphins)	(substituted in) Jock Campbell (from Queensland Country); (substituted in) Will Eadie (from Brisbane City); (substituted in) Liam McNamara (from Australia Sevens); (substituted in) Sefa Naivalu (from Rebels)	Jock Campbell; Filipo Daugunu; Will Eadie (did not play); Liam McNamara (short-term, did not play); Sefa Naivalu; Jordan Petaia
FB	Karmichael Hunt (did not play); Aidan Toua	(substituted off) Karmichael Hunt (to Waratahs)	(substituted in) Jack Hardy (from Force); (substituted in) Bryce Hegarty (from Waratahs)	Jack Hardy; Bryce Hegarty; Aidan Toua
Coach	Brad Thorn			Brad Thorn

== Waratahs ==
Waratahs transfers 2018–2019
Pos	2018 squad	Out	In	2019 squad
PR	Harry Johnson-Holmes; Sekope Kepu; Tom Robertson; Paddy Ryan; Matt Sandell (did not play); Kalivati Tawake (short-term); Shambeckler Vui; Cody Walker (did not play)	(substituted off) Paddy Ryan (to NSW Country Eagles); (substituted off) Matt Sandell (to Sydney Rays); (substituted off) Kalivati Tawake (to (France) Biarritz)	(substituted in) Angus Bell (from Newington College); (substituted in) Rory O'Connor (from Sydney Rays); (substituted in) Chris Talakai (from NSW Country Eagles)	Angus Bell (did not play); Harry Johnson-Holmes; Sekope Kepu; Rory O'Connor; Tom Robertson; Chris Talakai; Shambeckler Vui (did not play); Cody Walker (did not play)
HK	Damien Fitzpatrick; Tolu Latu; Hugh Roach; JP Sauni (did not play)	(substituted off) Hugh Roach (to Rebels)	(substituted in) Tatafu Polota-Nau (from (England) Leicester Tigers); (substituted in) Andrew Tuala (from Melbourne Rising)	Damien Fitzpatrick; Tolu Latu; Tatafu Polota-Nau (short-term); JP Sauni (did not play); Andrew Tuala
LK	Ned Hanigan; Ryan McCauley; Nick Palmer; Rob Simmons; Tom Staniforth	(substituted off) Nick Palmer (to Sydney Rays)	(substituted in) Will Harris (from Scots College); (substituted in) Le Roux Roets (from (South Africa) Pumas); (substituted in) Jeremy Williams (from Scots College)	Ned Hanigan; Will Harris (did not play); Ryan McCauley; Le Roux Roets (did not play); Rob Simmons; Tom Staniforth; Jeremy Williams (did not play)
FL	Jack Dempsey (did not play); Michael Hooper; Kelly Meafua (did not play); Will Miller; Lachlan Swinton (did not play); Michael Wells; Brad Wilkin	(substituted off) Kelly Meafua (to (France) Béziers); (substituted off) Brad Wilkin (to Rebels)	(substituted in) BJ Edwards (from Canberra Vikings); (substituted in) Hugh Sinclair (from Sydney Rays); (substituted in) Rory Suttor (from NSW Country Eagles)	Jack Dempsey; BJ Edwards (did not play); Michael Hooper; Will Miller; Hugh Sinclair; Rory Suttor (did not play); Lachlan Swinton; Michael Wells
N8	Jed Holloway; Maclean Jones (did not play)	(substituted off) Maclean Jones (to Sydney Rays)	(substituted in) Patrick Tafa (from NSW Country Eagles)	Jed Holloway; Patrick Tafa (did not play)
SH	Nick Duffy (short-term, did not play); Jake Gordon; Nick Phipps; Mitch Short (short-term); Michael Snowden (short-term)	(substituted off) Nick Duffy (to Sydney Rays); (substituted off) Michael Snowden (retired)		Jake Gordon; Nick Phipps; Mitch Short (did not play)
FH	Bernard Foley; Bryce Hegarty; Mack Mason (did not play)	(substituted off) Bryce Hegarty (to Reds)	(substituted in) Will Harrison (to Sydney Rays)	Bernard Foley; Will Harrison (did not play); Mack Mason
CE	Kurtley Beale; Lalakai Foketi; Alex Newsome; Irae Simone (did not play)	(substituted off) Irae Simone (to Brumbies)	(substituted in) Tautalatasi Tasi (from Brisbane City)	Kurtley Beale; Lalakai Foketi; Alex Newsome; Tautalatasi Tasi (short-term)
WG	Cameron Clark; Andrew Kellaway; Taqele Naiyaravoro; Curtis Rona	(substituted off) Andrew Kellaway (to (England) Northampton Saints); (substituted off) Taqele Naiyaravoro (to (England) Northampton Saints)	(substituted in) Adam Ashley-Cooper (from (Japan) Kobelco Steelers); (substituted in) Ben Donaldson (from Sydney Rays); (substituted in) John Folau (from Sydney Rays); (substituted in) James Ramm (from Sydney Rays)	Adam Ashley-Cooper; Cameron Clark; Ben Donaldson (did not play); John Folau (did not play); James Ramm (did not play); Curtis Rona
FB	Israel Folau		(substituted in) Karmichael Hunt (from Reds)	Israel Folau; Karmichael Hunt
Coach	Daryl Gibson			Daryl Gibson

== See also ==
- List of 2018–19 Premiership Rugby transfers
- List of 2018–19 Pro14 transfers
- List of 2018–19 Top 14 transfers
- List of 2018–19 RFU Championship transfers
- SANZAAR
- Super Rugby franchise areas
