= 2019 Super Rugby season =

Men's rugby union club competition

- Countries: Argentina (1 team); Australia (4 teams); Japan (1 team); New Zealand (5 teams); South Africa (4 teams)
- Tournament format(s): Conference and knockout
- Champions: Crusaders (10th title)
- Matches played: 106
- Tries scored: 673 (6.35 per match)
- Top point scorer(s): Handré Pollard, Bulls (194)
- Top try scorer(s): Sevu Reece, Crusaders (15)
- Official website: Official site

The 2019 Super Rugby season was the 24th season of Super Rugby, an annual rugby union competition organised by SANZAAR between teams from Argentina, Australia, Japan, New Zealand and South Africa. The 2019 season was the second season using the reduced 15-team format consisting of three geographical conferences since being reduced from an 18-team competition in 2017.

This was the final season that used the traditional format of international teams playing each other.

== Competition format ==
The 15 participating teams were divided into three geographical conferences: the Australian Conference (consisting of four Australian teams and the Japanese Sunwolves), the New Zealand Conference (consisting of five New Zealand teams), and the South African Conference (consisting of four South African teams and the Jaguares from Argentina).

In the group stages, there were 18 rounds of matches, with each team playing 16 matches and having two rounds of byes, resulting in a total of 120 matches. Teams played eight inter-conference matches and eight cross-conference matches; they played all the other teams in their conference twice — once at home and once away — and play once against four of the teams in the other two conferences.

The top team in each of the three conferences qualified for the quarterfinals, as do the next five teams with the best records across the three conferences, known as wildcards. The conference winners and best wildcard team hosted the quarterfinals. The quarterfinal winners progressed to the semifinal, and the winners of the semifinals progressed to the final.

== Standings ==
=== Conference standings ===
Australian conference
Pos	Team	Pts
1	Brumbies	48
2	Rebels	34
3	Waratahs	30
4	Reds	28
5	Sunwolves	12

New Zealand conference
Pos	Team	Pts
1	Crusaders	58
2	Hurricanes	53
3	Chiefs	36
4	Highlanders	36
5	Blues	30

South African conference
Pos	Team	Pts
1	Jaguares	51
2	Bulls	41
3	Sharks	37
4	Lions	35
5	Stormers	35

=== Overall standings ===
2019 Super Rugby standings
Pos	Team	Pld	W	D	L	PF	PA	PD	TF	TA	TB	LB	Pts	Qualification
1	Crusaders (C)	16	11	3	2	497	257	+240	73	31	8	0	58	Quarter-finals (Conference leaders)
2	Jaguares	16	11	0	5	461	352	+109	60	38	5	2	51	Quarter-finals (Conference leaders)
3	Brumbies	16	10	0	6	430	366	+64	65	49	5	3	48	Quarter-finals (Conference leaders)
4	Hurricanes	16	12	1	3	449	362	+87	60	46	3	0	53	Quarter-finals (Wildcard)
5	Bulls	16	8	2	6	410	369	+41	42	50	3	2	41	Quarter-finals (Wildcard)
6	Sharks	16	7	1	8	343	335	+8	40	39	3	4	37	Quarter-finals (Wildcard)
7	Chiefs	16	7	2	7	451	465	−14	63	59	2	2	36	Quarter-finals (Wildcard)
8	Highlanders	16	6	3	7	441	392	+49	60	53	2	4	36	Quarter-finals (Wildcard)
9	Lions	16	8	0	8	401	478	−77	53	64	2	1	35	
10	Stormers	16	7	1	8	344	366	−22	34	46	1	4	35	
11	Rebels	16	7	0	9	393	465	−72	56	61	3	3	34	
12	Waratahs	16	6	0	10	367	415	−48	46	54	0	6	30	
13	Blues	16	5	1	10	347	369	−22	45	47	2	6	30	
14	Reds	16	6	0	10	385	438	−53	50	59	1	3	28	
15	Sunwolves	16	2	0	14	294	584	−290	34	85	0	4	12	

Source: Super Rugby

=== Round-by-round ===
The table below shows each team's progression throughout the season. For each round, their cumulative points total is shown with the overall log position in brackets:

Team Progression – Australian Conference
Team	R1	R2	R3	R4	R5	R6	R7	R8	R9	R10	R11	R12	R13	R14	R15	R16	R17	R18	QF	SF	Final
Brumbies	1 (11th)	6 (3rd)	6 (9th)	7 (11th)	11 (9th)	11 (10th)	11 (12th)	11 (14th)	15 (12th)	19 (11th)	20 (12th)	24 (9th)	29 (2nd)	29 (3rd)	34 (3rd)	39 (3rd)	43 (3rd)	48 (3rd)	Won	Lost	N/A
Rebels	4 (2nd)	4 (9th)	8 (3rd)	12 (3rd)	13 (3rd)	13 (8th)	18 (2nd)	23 (2nd)	23 (3rd)	24 (2nd)	24 (3rd)	24 (3rd)	28 (6th)	28 (9th)	33 (5th)	34 (6th)	34 (8th)	34 (11th)	N/A	N/A	N/A
Reds	0 (12th)	1 (12th)	1 (14th)	1 (14th)	5 (14th)	10 (10th)	10 (13th)	14 (9th)	14 (13th)	18 (12th)	18 (13th)	22 (10th)	23 (11th)	23 (13th)	24 (14th)	24 (14th)	28 (14th)	28 (14th)	N/A	N/A	N/A
Sunwolves	0 (14th)	1 (14th)	5 (12th)	5 (13th)	6 (13th)	6 (15th)	10 (15th)	10 (15th)	10 (15th)	11 (15th)	11 (15th)	12 (15th)	12 (15th)	12 (15th)	12 (15th)	12 (15th)	12 (15th)	12 (15th)	N/A	N/A	N/A
Waratahs	1 (8th)	5 (8th)	5 (10th)	9 (7th)	10 (10th)	14 (3rd)	15 (7th)	16 (8th)	16 (10th)	20 (7th)	20 (10th)	21 (12th)	22 (13th)	26 (10th)	26 (12th)	30 (10th)	30 (12th)	30 (12th)	N/A	N/A	N/A
Team Progression – New Zealand Conference
Team	R1	R2	R3	R4	R5	R6	R7	R8	R9	R10	R11	R12	R13	R14	R15	R16	R17	R18	QF	SF	Final
Blues	1 (9th)	1 (13th)	2 (13th)	6 (12th)	6 (12th)	10 (11th)	15 (8th)	19 (5th)	20 (6th)	20 (8th)	20 (11th)	21 (13th)	21 (14th)	26 (11th)	26 (13th)	28 (13th)	29 (13th)	30 (13th)	N/A	N/A	N/A
Chiefs	1 (10th)	1 (15th)	1 (15th)	1 (15th)	3 (15th)	8 (14th)	12 (11th)	12 (13th)	16 (11th)	17 (14th)	17 (14th)	19 (14th)	23 (12th)	23 (14th)	27 (11th)	31 (9th)	31 (10th)	36 (7th)	Lost	N/A	N/A
Crusaders	4 (6th)	8 (2nd)	12 (1st)	17 (1st)	19 (1st)	19 (1st)	24 (1st)	29 (1st)	34 (1st)	34 (1st)	39 (1st)	42 (1st)	47 (1st)	49 (1st)	53 (1st)	53 (1st)	58 (1st)	58 (1st)	Won	Won	Won
Highlanders	4 (3rd)	8 (4th)	9 (7th)	10 (6th)	12 (7th)	13 (9th)	13 (10th)	14 (12th)	14 (14th)	18 (13th)	23 (8th)	25 (7th)	29 (5th)	29 (8th)	29 (10th)	29 (12th)	31 (11th)	36 (8th)	Lost	N/A	N/A
Hurricanes	4 (7th)	4 (10th)	8 (5th)	13 (4th)	15 (4th)	19 (4th)	19 (4th)	23 (4th)	23 (4th)	27 (4th)	32 (4th)	36 (4th)	40 (4th)	40 (4th)	40 (4th)	44 (4th)	49 (4th)	53 (4th)	Won	Lost	N/A
Team Progression – South African Conference
Team	R1	R2	R3	R4	R5	R6	R7	R8	R9	R10	R11	R12	R13	R14	R15	R16	R17	R18	QF	SF	Final
Bulls	5 (1st)	5 (5th)	9 (4th)	13 (2nd)	13 (2nd)	13 (7th)	17 (5th)	18 (6th)	23 (2nd)	23 (3rd)	24 (5th)	28 (2nd)	28 (7th)	32 (2nd)	32 (7th)	34 (7th)	36 (5th)	41 (5th)	Lost	N/A	N/A
Jaguares	0 (13th)	5 (7th)	9 (6th)	9 (8th)	9 (11th)	9 (12th)	10 (14th)	14 (10th)	19 (7th)	19 (9th)	23 (6th)	27 (6th)	28 (8th)	32 (5th)	36 (2nd)	41 (2nd)	46 (2nd)	51 (2nd)	Won	Won	Lost
Lions	4 (5th)	5 (6th)	5 (11th)	9 (9th)	13 (5th)	18 (2nd)	18 (3rd)	18 (7th)	18 (9th)	22 (5th)	22 (9th)	22 (11th)	26 (9th)	30 (6th)	30 (8th)	35 (5th)	35 (6th)	35 (9th)	N/A	N/A	N/A
Sharks	5 (4th)	10 (1st)	11 (2nd)	11 (5th)	11 (8th)	15 (5th)	16 (6th)	21 (3rd)	21 (5th)	22 (6th)	26 (2nd)	28 (5th)	29 (3rd)	29 (7th)	33 (6th)	33 (8th)	33 (9th)	37 (6th)	Lost	N/A	N/A
Stormers	0 (15th)	4 (11th)	8 (8th)	8 (10th)	13 (6th)	14 (6th)	14 (9th)	14 (11th)	18 (8th)	19 (10th)	23 (7th)	24 (8th)	24 (10th)	26 (12th)	30 (9th)	30 (11th)	34 (7th)	35 (10th)	N/A	N/A	N/A
Key:	win	draw	loss	bye																	

== Matches ==
The fixtures for the 2019 Super Rugby competition were released on 12 June 2018. The following matches were played during the regular season:

Home \ Away	BLU	BRU	BUL	CHI	CRU	HIG	HUR	JAG	LIO	REB	RED	SHA	STO	SUN	WAR
Blues	—	—	22–22	23–8	22–24	33–26	12–22	—	—	—	—	—	24–9	28–20	32–29
Brumbies	26–21	—	22–10	54–17	—	—	—	—	31–20	27–34	40–27	—	—	33–0	19–13
Bulls	—	—	—	20–56	13–45	—	—	20–22	48–27	—	32–17	37–14	40–3	—	28–21
Chiefs	33–29	—	—	—	40–27	27–30	23–23	—	17–23	—	19–13	29–23	—	15–30	—
Crusaders	19–11	36–14	—	57–28	—	43–17	38–22	—	36–10	66–0	—	21–21	—	—	—
Highlanders	24–12	—	24–24	31–31	0–0	—	28–31	32–27	—	—	36–31	—	—	—	49–12
Hurricanes	29–24	43–13	—	47–19	8–32	25–22	—	20–28	—	29–19	—	—	34–28	—	—
Jaguares	23–19	20–15	27–12	27–30	—	—	—	—	16–25	—	—	34–7	30–25	52–10	—
Lions	—	—	12–30	—	—	38–29	17–37	47–39	—	36–33	—	5–42	41–22	—	29–28
Rebels	—	29–26	17–32	8–59	—	24–19	—	—	—	—	30–24	—	24–41	42–15	15–20
Reds	29–28	36–14	—	—	12–22	—	—	23–34	—	13–32	—	—	24–12	32–26	32–40
Sharks	26–7	—	16–19	—	—	—	17–30	17–51	27–17	28–14	14–21	—	11–16	—	—
Stormers	—	17–19	24–23	—	19–19	34–22	—	35–8	19–17	—	—	9–12	—	31–18	—
Sunwolves	—	19–42	—	—	—	0–52	23–29	—	24–37	7–52	31–34	10–45	—	—	30–31
Waratahs	—	24–35	—	—	20–12	—	19–20	15–23	—	23–20	28–17	15–23	—	29–31	—

First match(es) will be played: 15 February 2019. Source: https://sanzarrugby.com/superrugby/fixtures/
Legend: Blue = home team win; Yellow = draw; Red = away team win.

== Finals ==
Quarter-finals
21 June – Christchurch
Crusaders	38
Highlanders	14
22 June – Wellington
Hurricanes	35
Bulls	28
21 June – Buenos Aires
Jaguares	21
Chiefs	16
22 June – Canberra
Brumbies	38
Sharks	13

Semi-finals
29 June – Christchurch
Crusaders	30
Hurricanes	26
28 June – Buenos Aires
Jaguares	39
Brumbies	7

Final
6 July – Christchurch
Crusaders	19
Jaguares	3

=== Quarter-finals ===
21 June 2019
19:35

Crusaders	38–14	Highlanders

AMI Stadium, Christchurch
Referee: Jaco Peyper

21 June 2019
19:35

Jaguares	21–16	Chiefs

José Amalfitani Stadium
Attendance: 16,914
Referee: Glen Jackson

22 June 2019
19:35

Hurricanes	35–28	Bulls

Westpac Stadium, Wellington
Attendance: 16,180
Referee: Nic Berry

22 June 2019
20:00

Brumbies	38–13	Sharks

GIO Stadium, Canberra
Attendance: 11,112
Referee: Mike Fraser

=== Semi-finals ===
28 June 2019
20:05

Jaguares	39–7	Brumbies
Try: Tomás Cubelli 4' c Tomás Lavanini 19' c Matías Orlando (2) 49' c, 63' c Emiliano Boffelli 78' m Con: Joaquín Díaz Bonilla (4) 5', 20', 50', 64'; Pen: Joaquín Díaz Bonilla (2) 8', 14'		Try: Folau Fainga'a 40' c Con: Christian Lealiifano 40+2'

José Amalfitani Stadium
Attendance: 31,000
Referee: Mike Fraser

29 June 2019
19:35

Crusaders	30–26	Hurricanes
Try: Sevu Reece (2) 13' c, 58' c Richie Mo'unga 44' c Con: Richie Mo'unga (3) 14', 45', 60'; Pen: Richie Mo'unga (3) 3', 33', 73'		Try: Ngani Laumape (2) 39' c, 51' c Ben Lam 41' m TJ Perenara 61' c Con: Beauden Barrett (3) 40', 51', 63'

Rugby League Park
Referee: Nic Berry

=== Final ===
6 July 2019
19:35

Crusaders	19–3	Jaguares
Try: Codie Taylor 25' c Con: Richie Mo'unga 26'; Pen: Richie Mo'unga (4) 40', 54', 59', 75'		Pen: Joaquín Díaz Bonilla 16'

Rugby League Park

== Players ==
=== Squads ===
The following 2019 Super Rugby squads have been named:

Blues squad
Forwards	Leni Apisai • Jed Brown • Gerard Cowley-Tuioti • Blake Gibson • Josh Goodhue • Alex Hodgman • Akira Ioane • Lua Li • Ezekiel Lindenmuth • Matt Matich • Sione Mafileo • Matt Moulds • Dalton Papalii • James Parsons • Marcel Renata • Tom Robinson • Hisa Sasagi • Scott Scrafton • Hoskins Sotutu • Karl Tu'inukuafe • Patrick Tuipulotu • Ofa Tu'ungafasi • Did not play • Jacob Pierce • Jimmy Tupou
Backs	Levi Aumua • Otere Black • Caleb Clarke • Michael Collins • Matt Duffie • TJ Faiane • Rieko Ioane • Melani Nanai • Sam Nock • Ma'a Nonu • Harry Plummer • Augustine Pulu • Jonathan Ruru • Tanielu Tele’a • Sonny Bill Williams • Did not play • Stephen Perofeta • Jordan Trainor
Coach	Leon MacDonald

Brumbies squad
Forwards	Allan Alaalatoa • Rory Arnold • Jahrome Brown • Sam Carter • Tom Cusack • Murray Douglas • Blake Enever • Folau Fainga'a • Vunipola Fifita • Leslie Leulua’iali’i-Makin • Joshua Mann-Rea • Lachlan McCaffrey • Connal McInerney • David Pocock • Tom Ross • Pete Samu • Scott Sio • James Slipper • Darcy Swain • Rob Valetini • Did not play • Ben Hyne • Maile Ngauamo • Angus Wagner
Backs	Tom Banks • Mack Hansen • Wharenui Hawera • Len Ikitau • Jordan Jackson-Hope • Tevita Kuridrani • Christian Lealiifano • Ryan Lonergan • Matt Lucas • Andy Muirhead • Chance Peni • Joe Powell • Toni Pulu • Irae Simone • Henry Speight • Lausii Taliauli • Tom Wright • Did not play • Bayley Kuenzle • Noah Lolesio
Coach	Dan McKellar

Bulls squad
Forwards	Tim Agaba • Thembelani Bholi • Schalk Brits • Lood de Jager • Corniel Els • Lizo Gqoboka • Johan Grobbelaar • Wiehahn Herbst • Jason Jenkins • Jannes Kirsten • Hanro Liebenberg • Simphiwe Matanzima • Trevor Nyakane • Paul Schoeman • Roelof Smit • Eli Snyman • RG Snyman • Ruan Steenkamp • Dayan van der Westhuizen • Marco van Staden • Conraad van Vuuren • Duane Vermeulen • Jaco Visagie • Did not play • Matthys Basson • Nick de Jager • Carel du Preez • Madot Mabokela • Edgar Marutlulle • Nqoba Mxoli • Hendré Stassen • Muller Uys • Jano Venter
Backs	Warrick Gelant • Cornal Hendricks • JT Jackson • Johnny Kôtze • Jesse Kriel • Manie Libbok • Burger Odendaal • Embrose Papier • Handré Pollard • Divan Rossouw • Dylan Sage • Rosko Specman • Jade Stighling • Ivan van Zyl • André Warner • Did not play • Marnitz Boshoff • Stedman Gans • Travis Ismaiel • Theo Maree • Duncan Matthews • Chris Smith
Coach	Pote Human

Chiefs squad
Forwards	Michael Allardice • Tyler Ardron • Lachlan Boshier • Mitchell Brown • Sam Cane • Ryan Coxon • Nathan Harris • Luke Jacobson • Mitch Jacobson • Mitchell Karpik • Sefo Kautai • Nepo Laulala • Daymon Leasuasu • Tevita Mafileo • Atunaisa Moli • Jesse Parete • Liam Polwart • Brodie Retallick • Aidan Ross • Taleni Seu • Bradley Slater • Pita Gus Sowakula • Angus Ta'avao • Samisoni Taukei'aho • Did not play • Kane Hames • Fin Hoeata • Laghlan McWhannell • Reuben O'Neill
Backs	Solomon Alaimalo • Jack Debreczeni • Stephen Donald • Orbyn Leger • Anton Lienert-Brown • Tumua Manu • Damian McKenzie • Marty McKenzie • Ataata Moeakiola • Etene Nanai-Seturo • Alex Nankivell • Shaun Stevenson • Bailyn Sullivan • Te Toiroa Tahuriorangi • Jonathan Taumateine • Sean Wainui • Brad Weber • Did not play • Tiaan Falcon
Coach	Colin Cooper

Crusaders squad
Forwards	Michael Alaalatoa • Harry Allan • Scott Barrett • Ethan Blackadder • George Bower • Whetu Douglas • Mitchell Dunshea • Owen Franks • Ben Funnell • Billy Harmon • Oliver Jager • Andrew Makalio • Brodie McAlister • Joe Moody • Tim Perry • Kieran Read • Luke Romano • Tom Sanders • Quinten Strange • Jordan Taufua • Codie Taylor • Matt Todd • Isileli Tu'ungafasi • Sam Whitelock
Backs	Tim Bateman • George Bridge • Brett Cameron • Ryan Crotty • Mitchell Drummond • Ere Enari • Braydon Ennor • Leicester Fainga'anuku • Jack Goodhue • Bryn Hall • David Havili • Mitchell Hunt • Will Jordan • Manasa Mataele • Richie Mo'unga • Ngane Punivai • Sevu Reece • Did not play • Israel Dagg
Coach	Scott Robertson

Highlanders squad
Forwards	Liam Coltman • Josh Dickson • Ash Dixon • Elliot Dixon • Sef Fa'agase • Tom Franklin • Shannon Frizell • Jackson Hemopo • Dillon Hunt • Josh Iosefa-Scott • Ricky Jackson • Ayden Johnstone • James Lentjes • Daniel Lienert-Brown • Tyrel Lomax • Marino Mikaele-Tu'u • Pari Pari Parkinson • Liam Squire • Siate Tokolahi • Jack Whetton • Luke Whitelock • Did not play • Ray Niuia
Backs	Marty Banks • Richard Buckman • Matt Faddes • Folau Fakatava • Bryn Gatland • Kayne Hammington • Dan Hollinshead • Jordan Hyland • Josh Ioane • Tevita Li • Josh McKay • Waisake Naholo • Aaron Smith • Ben Smith • Rob Thompson • Sio Tomkinson • Thomas Umaga-Jensen • Teihorangi Walden • Did not play • Tevita Nabura
Coach	Aaron Mauger

Hurricanes squad
Forwards	Fraser Armstrong • Asafo Aumua • Heiden Bedwell-Curtis • James Blackwell • Dane Coles • Gareth Evans • Chris Eves • Alex Fidow • Vaea Fifita • Sam Henwood • Du'Plessis Kirifi • Kane Le'aupepe • Ben May • Liam Mitchell • Xavier Numia • Reed Prinsep • Ricky Riccitelli • Ardie Savea • Toby Smith • Jeffery Toomaga-Allen • Isaia Walker-Leawere • Did not play • Geoff Cridge • Andries Ferreira • Sam Lousi • James O'Reilly
Backs	Vince Aso • Beauden Barrett • Jordie Barrett • Finlay Christie • Jackson Garden-Bachop • Wes Goosen • Richard Judd • Ben Lam • Ngani Laumape • Jonah Lowe • James Marshall • TJ Perenara • Billy Proctor • Matt Proctor • Salesi Rayasi • Fletcher Smith • Chase Tiatia • Danny Toala • Peter Umaga-Jensen • Did not play • Nehe Milner-Skudder
Coach	John Plumtree

Jaguares squad
Forwards	Matías Alemanno • Gaspar Baldunciel • Rodrigo Bruni • Agustín Creevy • Santiago García Botta • Francisco Gorrissen • Marcos Kremer • Tomás Lavanini • Juan Manuel Leguizamón • Tomás Lezana • Pablo Matera • Santiago Medrano • Julián Montoya • Javier Ortega Desio • Lucas Paulos • Guido Petti • Enrique Pieretto • Santiago Socino • Lucio Sordoni • Nahuel Tetaz Chaparro • Mayco Vivas • Juan Pablo Zeiss • Did not play • Javier Díaz • Diego Fortuny • Santiago Grondona • Franco Molina
Backs	Gonzalo Bertranou • Emiliano Boffelli • Sebastián Cancelliere • Santiago Carreras • Tomás Cubelli • Jerónimo de la Fuente • Bautista Delguy • Joaquín Díaz Bonilla • Bautista Ezcurra • Felipe Ezcurra • Santiago González Iglesias • Martín Landajo • Juan Cruz Mallia • Domingo Miotti • Matías Moroni • Ramiro Moyano • Matías Orlando • Joaquín Tuculet • Did not play • Santiago Chocobares • Ignacio Mendy
Coach	Gonzalo Quesada

Lions squad
Forwards	Jacobie Adriaanse • Cyle Brink • Jan-Henning Campher • Robbie Coetzee • Hacjivah Dayimani • Rhyno Herbst • Pieter Jansen • Johannes Jonker • Robert Kruger • Stephan Lewies • Malcolm Marx • Nathan McBeth • Reinhard Nothnagel • Marvin Orie • Carlü Sadie • Marnus Schoeman • Sti Sithole • Dylan Smith • Kwagga Smith • Vincent Tshituka • Wilhelm van der Sluys • Frans van Wyk • James Venter • Ruan Vermaak • Warren Whiteley • Did not play • Jo-Hanko de Villiers • Lourens Erasmus • Chergin Fillies • Len Massyn • Danie Mienie • PJ Steenkamp
Backs	Andries Coetzee • Ruan Combrinck • Ross Cronjé • Aphiwe Dyantyi • Tyrone Green • Nic Groom • Elton Jantjies • Gianni Lombard • Sylvian Mahuza • Lionel Mapoe • Franco Naudé • Shaun Reynolds • Wandisile Simelane • Courtnall Skosan • Dillon Smit • Harold Vorster • Did not play • Eddie Fouché • Jan-Louis la Grange • Manuel Rass • Madosh Tambwe • Bradley Thain • Morné van den Berg • Wayne van der Bank • Lourens van der Schyff
Coach	Swys de Bruin • Ivan van Rooyen

Rebels squad
Forwards	Robbie Abel • Jermaine Ainsley • Adam Coleman • Angus Cottrell • Pone Fa'amausili • Tetera Faulkner • Matt Gibbon • Esei Ha'angana • Richard Hardwick • Ross Haylett-Petty • Sam Jeffries • Luke Jones • Rob Leota • Isi Naisarani • Matt Philip • Anaru Rangi • Hugh Roach • Sam Talakai • Jordan Uelese • Brad Wilkin • Did not play • Ben Daley • Mees Erasmus • Trevor Hosea • Fereti Sa'aga
Backs	Quade Cooper • Stuart Dunbar • Tom English • Will Genia • Harrison Goddard • Dane Haylett-Petty • Reece Hodge • Marika Koroibete • Jack Maddocks • Campbell Magnay • Bill Meakes • Michael Ruru • Matt To'omua • Sione Tuipulotu • Semisi Tupou
Coach	David Wessels

Reds squad
Forwards	Angus Blyth • Feao Fotuaika • Scott Higginbotham • Harry Hockings • Harry Hoopert • Adam Korczyk • Gavin Luka • Alex Mafi • Fraser McReight • Brandon Paenga-Amosa • Izack Rodda • Lukhan Salakaia-Loto • Angus Scott-Young • JP Smith • Ruan Smith • Caleb Timu • Taniela Tupou • Liam Wright • Did not play • Efi Ma'afu • Harry Wilson
Backs	Jock Campbell • Filipo Daugunu • Chris Feauai-Sautia • Jack Hardy • Bryce Hegarty • Samu Kerevi • Isaac Lucas • Scott Malolua • Tate McDermott • Matt McGahan • Sefa Naivalu • Duncan Paia'aua • Jordan Petaia • Moses Sorovi • Hamish Stewart • Aidan Toua • Seb Wileman • Did not play • Will Eadie • Liam McNamara • Teti Tela • James Tuttle
Coach	Brad Thorn

Sharks squad
Forwards	Hyron Andrews • Ruan Botha • Craig Burden • Phepsi Buthelezi • Cullen Collopy • Dan du Preez • Jean-Luc du Preez • Thomas du Toit • Gideon Koegelenberg • Mzamo Majola • Fez Mbatha • Khutha Mchunu • John-Hubert Meyer • Tendai Mtawarira • Coenie Oosthuizen • Tyler Paul • Dylan Richardson • Juan Schoeman • Luke Stringer • Akker van der Merwe • JJ van der Mescht • Philip van der Walt • Ruben van Heerden • Kerron van Vuuren • Jacques Vermeulen • Wian Vosloo • Did not play • Kwanda Dimaza • Andrew Evans • Tera Mtembu • Chiliboy Ralepelle
Backs	Lukhanyo Am • Curwin Bosch • Robert du Preez • André Esterhuizen • Aphelele Fassi • Marius Louw • Makazole Mapimpi • Zee Mkhabela • Lwazi Mvovo • S'busiso Nkosi • Louis Schreuder • Rhyno Smith • Kobus van Wyk • Jeremy Ward • Grant Williams • Cameron Wright • Did not play • Muller du Plessis • Sanele Nohamba • Courtney Winnaar • Leolin Zas
Coach	Robert du Preez

Stormers squad
Forwards	Juarno Augustus • Jaco Coetzee • Johan du Toit • Pieter-Steph du Toit • Eben Etzebeth • Neethling Fouché • Corné Fourie • Dan Jooste • Steven Kitshoff • Siya Kolisi • Michael Kumbirai • Wilco Louw • Frans Malherbe • Chris Massyn • Bongi Mbonambi • David Meihuizen • Salmaan Moerat • Sikhumbuzo Notshe • Scarra Ntubeni • Marno Redelinghuys • JD Schickerling • Chad Solomon • Kobus van Dyk • Ernst van Rhyn • Chris van Zyl • Alistair Vermaak • Cobus Wiese • Did not play • Kwenzo Blose • Lee-Marvin Mazibuko • Ramone Samuels • Nama Xaba
Backs	Craig Barry • Damian de Allende • Daniël du Plessis • Jean-Luc du Plessis • JJ Engelbrecht • Herschel Jantjies • Dan Kriel • Dillyn Leyds • SP Marais • Ruhan Nel • Sergeal Petersen • Justin Phillips • Seabelo Senatla • Joshua Stander • Edwill van der Merwe • Jano Vermaak • EW Viljoen • Damian Willemse • Did not play • Paul de Wet • Duncan Saal
Coach	Robbie Fleck

Sunwolves squad
Forwards	Mark Abbott • Asaeli Ai Valu • Takuma Asahara • Jaba Bregvadze • Ben Gunter • Ryota Hasegawa • Grant Hattingh • Uwe Helu • Shota Horie • Koo Ji-won • Takuya Kitade • Amanaki Mafi • Pauliasi Manu • Shuhei Matsuhashi • Masataka Mikami • Craig Millar • Shogo Miura • James Moore • Masakatsu Nishikawa • Yuya Odo • Conán O'Donnell • Sam Prattley • Dan Pryor • Kara Pryor • Ed Quirk • Tom Rowe • Atsushi Sakate • Luke Thompson • Yoshitaka Tokunaga • Hendrik Tui • Nathan Vella • Rahboni Warren-Vosayaco • Alex Woonton • Hiroshi Yamashita • Did not play • Samuela Anise • Kazuki Himeno • Keita Inagaki • Lappies Labuschagné • Michael Leitch • Yusuke Niwai • Wimpie van der Walt • Hencus van Wyk
Backs	Jamie Booth • Phil Burleigh • Jason Emery • Shane Gates • Jamie Henry • Timothy Lafaele • Michael Little • Semisi Masirewa • Rikiya Matsuda • Ryoto Nakamura • Hayden Parker • Rene Ranger • Hosea Saumaki • Kaito Shigeno • Yu Tamura • Fumiaki Tanaka • Harumichi Tatekawa • Sione Teaupa • Josh Timu • Keisuke Uchida • Gerhard van den Heever • Akihito Yamada • Ryohei Yamanaka • Takuya Yamasawa • Did not play • Kenki Fukuoka • Lomano Lemeki • Yutaka Nagare • Will Tupou
Coach	Tony Brown

Waratahs squad
Forwards	Jack Dempsey • Damien Fitzpatrick • Ned Hanigan • Jed Holloway • Michael Hooper • Harry Johnson-Holmes • Sekope Kepu • Tolu Latu • Ryan McCauley • Will Miller • Rory O'Connor • Tatafu Polota-Nau • Tom Robertson • Rob Simmons • Hugh Sinclair • Tom Staniforth • Lachlan Swinton • Chris Talakai • Andrew Tuala • Shambeckler Vui • Michael Wells • Did not play • Angus Bell • BJ Edwards • Will Harris • Le Roux Roets • JP Sauni • Rory Suttor • Patrick Tafa • Cody Walker • Jeremy Williams
Backs	Adam Ashley-Cooper • Kurtley Beale • Cameron Clark • Lalakai Foketi • Israel Folau • Bernard Foley • Jake Gordon • Karmichael Hunt • Mack Mason • Alex Newsome • Nick Phipps • Curtis Rona • Tautalatasi Tasi • Did not play • Ben Donaldson • John Folau • Will Harrison • James Ramm • Mitch Short
Coach	Daryl Gibson

=== Top scorers ===
The top ten try and point scorers during the 2019 Super Rugby season are:

Top ten try scorers
No	Player	Team	Tries
1	(New Zealand) Sevu Reece	Crusaders	15
2	(New Zealand) Ngani Laumape	Hurricanes	13
3	(Australia) Folau Fainga'a	Brumbies	12
4	(Australia) Jack Maddocks	Rebels	10
4	(New Zealand) Braydon Ennor	Crusaders	10
4	(Fiji) Semisi Masirewa	Sunwolves	10
7	(New Zealand) Rieko Ioane	Blues	9
8	(New Zealand) Will Jordan	Crusaders	8
8	(New Zealand) Wes Goosen	Hurricanes	8
10	(South Africa) Dan du Preez	Sharks	7
10	(Australia) Tevita Kuridrani	Brumbies	7
10	(Argentina) Ramiro Moyano	Jaguares	7
10	(South Africa) Kwagga Smith	Lions	7
10	(New Zealand) Ben Lam	Hurricanes	7

Top ten points scorers
No	Player	Team	Points
1	(South Africa) Handré Pollard	Bulls	194
2	(New Zealand) Richie Mo'unga	Crusaders	182
3	(Australia) Bryce Hegarty	Reds	156
4	(Australia) Bernard Foley	Waratahs	137
5	(South Africa) Elton Jantjies	Lions	124
6	(Argentina) Joaquin Diaz Bonilla	Jaguares	119
7	(New Zealand) Beauden Barrett	Hurricanes	118
8	(Australia) Quade Cooper	Rebels	116
9	(New Zealand) Josh Ioane	Highlanders	114
10	(Australia) Christian Lealiifano	Brumbies	113

== Referees ==
The following refereeing panel was appointed by SANZAAR for the 2019 Super Rugby season:

2019 Super Rugby referees
Argentina	Federico Anselmi
Australia	Nic Berry • Angus Gardner • Damon Murphy
New Zealand	Nick Briant • Mike Fraser • Glen Jackson • Ben O'Keeffe • Brendon Pickerill • Paul Williams
South Africa	AJ Jacobs • Jaco Peyper • Rasta Rasivhenge • Egon Seconds • Marius van der Westhuizen

== Attendances ==
Team	Main Stadium	Capacity	Total Attendance	Average Attendance	% Capacity
(New Zealand) Blues	Eden Park	50,000			
(New Zealand) Chiefs	Waikato Stadium	25,800			
(New Zealand) Hurricanes	Westpac Stadium	34,500	128,101	14,233	44%
(New Zealand) Crusaders	Rugby League Park	18,000			
(New Zealand) Highlanders	Forsyth Barr Stadium	30,728	93,424	13,346	46%
(Australia) Reds	Suncorp Stadium	52,500	90,815	11,351	21%
(Australia) Brumbies	Canberra Stadium	25,011	79,185	8,798	35%
(Australia) Waratahs	Bankwest Stadium	30,000			
(Australia) Melbourne Rebels	AAMI Park	29,500			
(South Africa) Sharks	ABSA Stadium	52,000			
(South Africa) Bulls	Loftus Versfeld	51,792			
(South Africa) Lions	Ellis Park	62,567			
(South Africa) Stormers	Newlands Stadium	51,900			
(Argentina) Jaguares	José Amalfitani Stadium	49,640			
(Japan) Sunwolves	Prince Chichibu Memorial Stadium	27,188			
