= 2019 New South Wales Waratahs season =

2019 New South Wales Waratahs rugby union season

New South Wales Waratahs
- 2019 season
- Coach: Daryl Gibson
- Chairman: Roger Davis
- Stadium: Brookvale Oval, Brookvale; Sydney Cricket Ground, Moore Park; McDonald Jones Stadium, Newcastle; Western Sydney Stadium, Parramatta
- Super Rugby: 12th
- Finals: Did not qualify
- Record: P: 16; 6–10–0
- Top try scorer: League: Curtis Rona (6 tries)
- Top points scorer: League: Bernard Foley (137 points)
- Highest home attendance: 17,111 v Hurricanes (16 February)
- Lowest home attendance: 10,114 v Rebels (27 April)
- Average home attendance: 11,569 (Note: In round six of the Super Rugby season the Waratahs played the Crusaders at the SCG. Unfortunately the match attendance is yet to be confirmed. Thus, the average home attendance statistics for the Waratahs does not include this match.)
Home colours	Away colours

The 2019 New South Wales Waratahs season was the club's 23rd season since the inception of the Super Rugby in 1996.

== Squad ==
=== Coaching and management ===
Title	Name
Head coach	Daryl Gibson
Assistant, attack and backs coach	Chris Malone
Forwards and assistant coach	Simon Cron

=== Current squad ===
The squad for the 2019 season:

Waratahs Super Rugby squad
**Props**: (Australia) Angus Bell; (Australia) Harry Johnson-Holmes; (Australia) **Sekope Kepu**; (Australia) Rory O'Connor; (Australia) **Tom Robertson**; (Australia) Chris Talakai; (Australia) Shambeckler Vui; (Australia) Cody Walker; **Hookers**: (Australia) Damien Fitzpatrick; (Australia) **Tolu Latu**; (Australia) JP Sauni; (Australia) Andrew Tuala; **Locks**: (Australia) **Ned Hanigan**; (Australia) Will Harris; (Australia) Ryan McCauley; (South Africa) Le Roux Roets; (Australia) **Rob Simmons**; (Australia) Tom Staniforth; (Australia) Jeremy Williams	**Loose forwards**: (Australia) **Jack Dempsey**; (Australia) BJ Edwards; (Australia) Jed Holloway; (Australia) **Michael Hooper** (c); (Australia) Will Miller; (Australia) Hugh Sinclair; (Australia) Rory Suttor; (Australia) Lachlan Swinton; (Australia) Patrick Tafa; (Australia) Michael Wells; **Scrum-halves**: (Australia) **Jake Gordon**; (Australia) **Nick Phipps**; (Australia) Mitch Short; **Fly-halves**: (Australia) **Bernard Foley**; (Australia) Will Harrison; (Australia) Mack Mason	**Centres**: (Australia) **Kurtley Beale**; (Australia) Lalakai Foketi; (Australia) Alex Newsome; **Wingers**: (Australia) **Adam Ashley-Cooper**; (Australia) Cameron Clark; (Australia) Ben Donaldson; (Australia) John Folau; (Australia) James Ramm; (Australia) **Curtis Rona**; **Fullbacks**: (Australia) **Israel Folau**; (Australia) **Karmichael Hunt**
(c) Denotes team captain, **Bold** denotes internationally capped and ^{ST} indicated short-term cover.

=== Transfers ===
In:

Player	Position	Previous club	Notes
Adam Ashley-Cooper	Wing	Kobelco Steelers	
Andrew Tuala	Hooker	Melbourne Rising	
Angus Bell	Prop	Newington College	
Ben Donaldson	Wing	Sydney Rays	
BJ Edwards	Flanker	Canberra Vikings	
Chris Talakai	Prop	New South Wales Country Eagles	
Hugh Sinclair	Flanker	Sydney Rays	
James Ramm	Wing	Sydney Rays	
Jeremy Williams	Lock	Scots College	
John Folau	Wing	Sydney Rays	
Karmichael Hunt	Fullback	Queensland Reds (Super Rugby)	
Le Roux Roets	Lock	Pumas	
Patrick Tafa	Number 8	New South Wales Country Eagles	
Rory O'Connor	Prop	Sydney Rays	
Rory Suttor	Flanker	New South Wales Country Eagles	
Will Harris	Lock	Scots College	
Will Harrison	Fly-half	Sydney Rays	

Out:

Player	Position	Club	Notes
Andrew Kellaway	Wing	Northampton Saints	
Brad Wilkin	Flanker	Melbourne Rebels (Super Rugby)	
Bryce Hegarty	Fly-half	Queensland Reds (Super Rugby)	
Hugh Roach	Hooker	Melbourne Rebels (Super Rugby)	
Irae Simone	Centre	Brumbies (Super Rugby)	
Kalivati Tawake	Prop	Biarritz	
Kelly Meafua	Flanker	Béziers	
Maclean Jones	Number 8	Sydney Rays	
Matt Sandell	Prop	Sydney Rays	
Michael Snowden	Scrum-half		retired
Nick Duffy	Scrum-half	Sydney Rays	
Nick Palmer	Lock	Sydney Rays	
Paddy Ryan	Prop	New South Wales Country Eagles	
Taqele Naiyaravoro	Wing	Northampton Saints	

== Season summary ==
=== Season results ===
Rnd	Date & local time		Team	Score	Venue	Attendance	Ref.
1	Saturday, 16 February (7:45 pm)	H	Hurricanes	19–20	Brookvale Oval, Sydney, New South Wales, Australia	17,111	
2	Saturday, 23 February (1:15 pm)	A	Sunwolves	30–31	Prince Chichibu Memorial Stadium, Tokyo, Japan	14,499	
3	Bye						
4	Saturday, 9 March (7:45 pm)	H	Reds	28–17	Sydney Cricket Ground, Sydney, New South Wales, Australia	15,681	
5	Friday, 15 March (7:45 pm)	A	Brumbies	19–13	GIO Stadium, Canberra, Australian Capital Territory, Australia	12,112	
6	Saturday, 23 March (7:45 pm)	H	Crusaders	20–12	Sydney Cricket Ground, Sydney, New South Wales, Australia		
7	Friday, 29 March (7:45 pm)	H	Sunwolves	29–31	McDonald Jones Stadium, Newcastle, New South Wales, Australia	12,621	
8	Saturday, 6 April (7:35 pm)	A	Blues	32–29	Eden Park, Auckland, New Zealand		
9	Bye						
10	Saturday, 20 April (7:45 pm)	H	Rebels	23–20	Sydney Cricket Ground, Sydney, New South Wales, Australia	10,114	
11	Saturday, 27 April (7:45 pm)	H	Sharks	15–23	Western Sydney Stadium, Sydney, New South Wales, Australia	10,605	
12	Saturday, 4 May (3:05 pm)	A	Bulls	28–21	Loftus Versfeld, Pretoria, Gauteng, South Africa	7,483	
13	Saturday, 11 May (3:05 pm)	A	Lions	29–28	Emirates Airlines Park, Johannesburg, Gauteng, South Africa		
14	Saturday, 18 May (7:45 pm)	A	Reds	32–40	Suncorp Stadium, Brisbane, Queensland, Australia	12,236	
15	Saturday, 25 May (7:45 pm)	H	Jaguares	15–23	Western Sydney Stadium, Sydney, New South Wales, Australia	13,885	
16	Friday, 31 May (7:45 pm)	A	Rebels	15–20	AAMI Park, Melbourne, Victoria, Australia		
17	Saturday, 8 June (7:45 pm)	H	Brumbies	24–35	Western Sydney Stadium, Sydney, New South Wales, Australia		
18	Friday, 13 July (7:35 pm)	A	Highlanders	49–12	Rugby Park Stadium, Invercargill, New Zealand		

=== Standings ===
Australian conference
Pos	Team	P	W	D	L	PF	PA	PD	TF	TA	TB	LB	Pts
2	(Australia) Rebels	16	7	0	9	393	465	–72	56	61	3	3	34
3	(Australia) Waratahs	16	6	0	10	367	415	–48	46	54	0	6	30
4	(Australia) Reds	16	6	0	10	385	438	–53	50	59	1	3	28

Overall standings
Pos	Team	P	W	D	L	PF	PA	PD	TF	TA	TB	LB	Pts
11	(Australia) Rebels	16	7	0	9	393	465	–72	56	61	3	3	34
12	(Australia) Waratahs	16	6	0	10	367	415	–48	46	54	0	6	30
13	(New Zealand) Blues	16	5	1	10	347	369	−22	45	47	2	6	30

== Statistics ==
Top point scorer
No.	Player	Pos.	Tries	Pen	Con	Pts
1	Bernard Foley	Fly-half	3	28	22	137
2	Curtis Rona	Wing	6	0	0	30
3	Alex Newsome	Centre	5	0	0	25
4	Kurtley Beale	Centre	4	1	0	22
5	Israel Folau	Fullback	4	0	0	20
5	Nick Phipps	Scrum-half	4	0	0	20
7	Michael Hooper	Flanker	3	0	0	15
7	Adam Ashley-Cooper	Centre	3	0	0	15
9	Jake Gordon	Scrum-half	2	0	0	10
9	Cameron Clark	Wing	2	0	0	10
9	Michael Wells	Flanker	2	0	0	10

Top try scorer
No.	Player	Pos.	Tries
1	Curtis Rona	Wing	6
2	Alex Newsome	Centre	5
3	Israel Folau	Fullback	4
3	Kurtley Beale	Centre	4
3	Nick Phipps	Scrum-half	4
6	Bernard Foley	Fly-half	3
6	Michael Hooper	Flanker	3
6	Adam Ashley-Cooper	Centre	3
9	Jake Gordon	Scrum-half	2
9	Cameron Clark	Wing	2
9	Michael Wells	Flanker	2
