= Steve Hegarty =

Australian former rugby league player

Personal information
- Born: 21 March 1962 (age 62)

Playing information
- Position: Fullback, Wing
Club
Years	Team	Pld	T	G	FG	P
1984–86	Manly-Warringah Sea Eagles	24	4	56	1	129
1987–88	Seagulls-Diehards
1989–??	Fortitude Valley
	Total	24	4	56	1	129

Steve Hegarty (born 21 March 1962) is an Australian former professional rugby league player who played for the Manly-Warringah Sea Eagles in the New South Wales Rugby League. He also played for the Seagulls-Diehards, captaining them through the 1987 Woolies Pre-Season. Hegarty was not included in the Seagulls-Diehards starting side after the pre-season, playing in the first game of the regular season as a replacement before being succeeded as captain by Mark Hohn.

Hegarty also coached the Samford Stags in 2016 in the Brisbane Second Division Rugby League.

His son, Bryce Hegarty, is a professional rugby union player.
