= Michael Ruru =

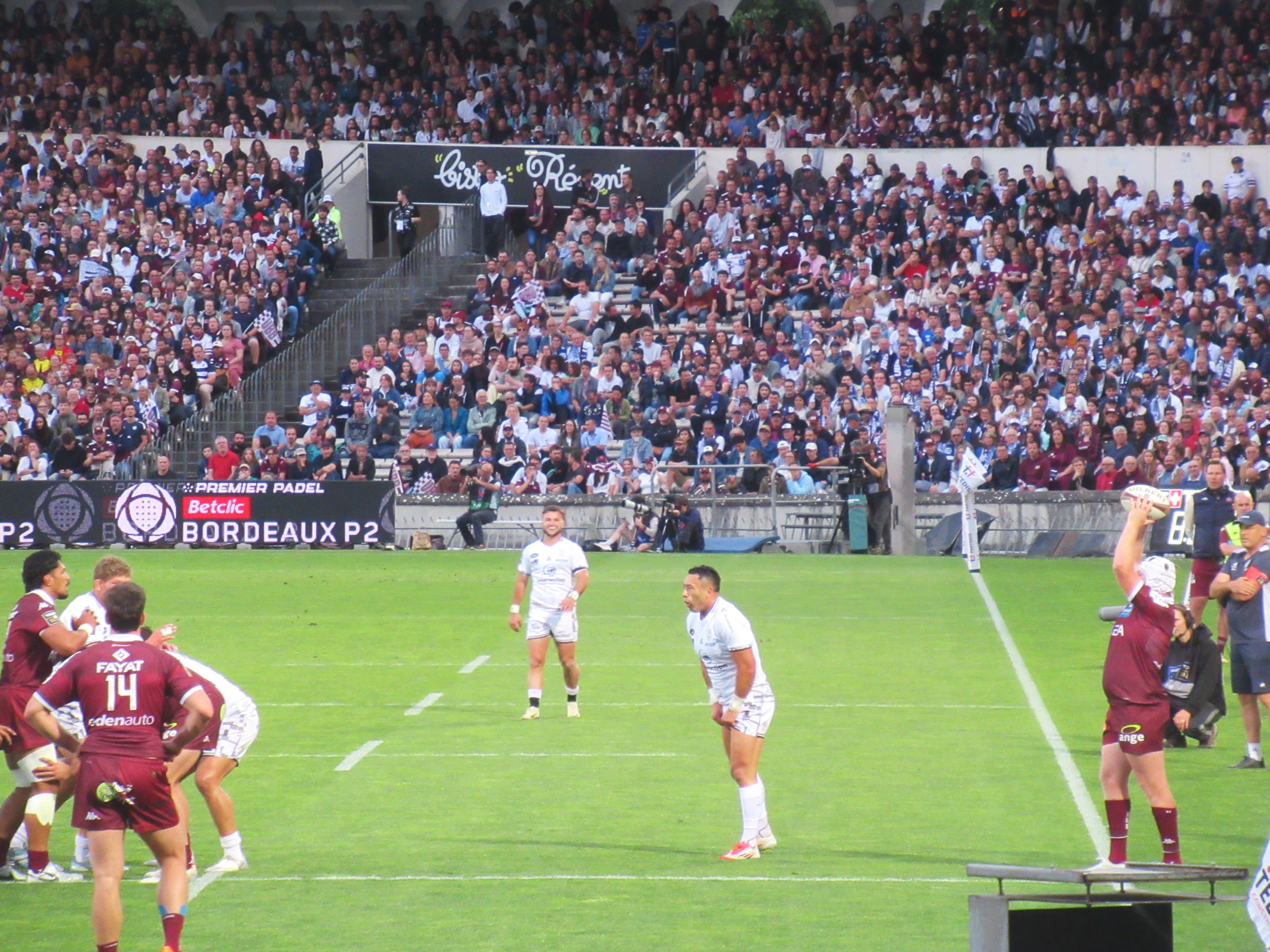
- Michael Ruru playing for Vannes
- Born: 3 December 1990 (age 35) Napier, New Zealand
- Height: 182 cm (6 ft 0 in)
- Weight: 94 kg (14 st 11 lb; 207 lb)

Rugby union career
- Position: Scrum-half
- Current team: Vannes
Senior career
Years	Team	Apps	(Points)
2012	Hawke's Bay	1	(0)
2014–2017	Perth Spirit	23	(20)
2018	Melbourne Rising	7	(20)
2019–2023	Bayonne	55	(30)
2023–	Vannes	64	(105)
- Correct as of 26 October 2025
Super Rugby
Years	Team	Apps	(Points)
2017	Force	11	(0)
2018–2019	Rebels	30	(20)

Michael Ruru (born 3 December 1990) is a New Zealand rugby union player who plays for Vannes in the French Top 14, having previously played for Bayonne. He is the older brother of Auckland Blues scrum half Jonathan Ruru.

== Super Rugby statistics ==
As of 16 June 2019

Season	Team	Games	Starts	Sub	Mins	Tries	Cons	Pens	Drops	Points	Yel	Red
2017	Force	11	5	6	556	0	0	0	0	0	0	0
2018	Rebels	16	8	8	779	3	0	0	0	15	1	0
2019	Rebels	14	2	12	253	1	0	0	0	5	0	0
Total		41	15	26	1588	4	0	0	0	20	1	0
