= Lukhan Salakaia-Loto =

Australia international rugby union player

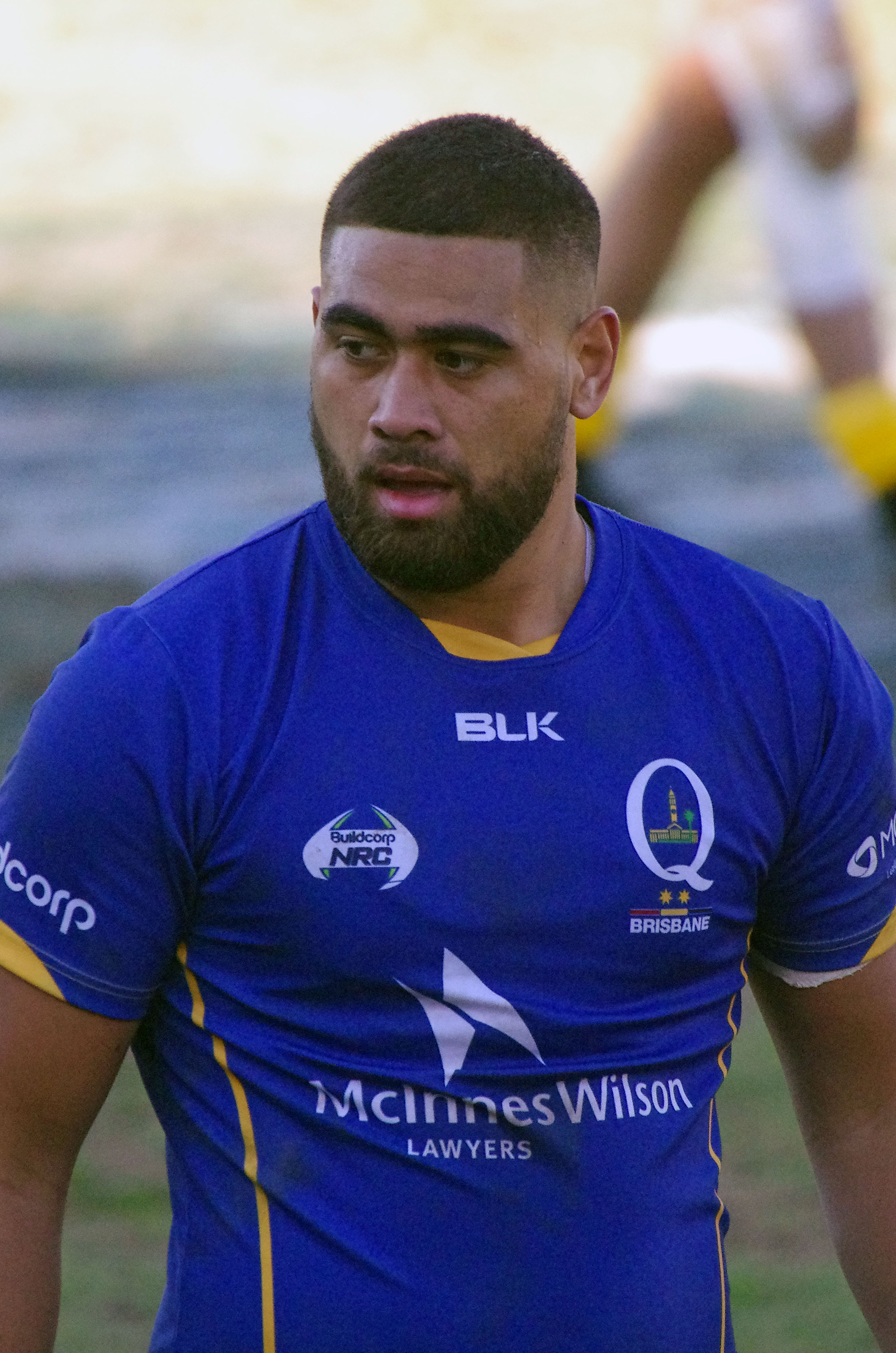
- Salakaia-Loto with Brisbane City in 2016
- Born: Lukhan Herman Lealaiauloto Tui; 19 September 1996 (age 30) Auckland, New Zealand
- Height: 1.98 m (6 ft 6 in)
- Weight: 123 kg (19 st 5 lb)
- School: John Edmondson High, NSW

Rugby union career
- Position(s): Lock, Flanker, Number 8
Senior career
Years	Team	Apps	(Points)
2015	Randwick	1	(0)
2016–2022	Brothers Old Boys	1	(0)
2016–2022	Brisbane City	11	(12)
2022–2023	Northampton Saints	24	(10)
- Correct as of 8 June 2023
Super Rugby
Years	Team	Apps	(Points)
2016–2022	Queensland Reds	69	(30)
2024	Melbourne Rebels	8	(0)
2025–	Queensland Reds	20	(15)
- Correct as of 7 June 2026
International career
Years	Team	Apps	(Points)
2015–2016	Australia U20	10	
2017–	Australia	50	(10)
2023	Australia A	1	(0)
2025	ANZAC XV	1	(0)
2025	First Nations & Pasifika XV	1	(0)
- Correct as of 17 October 2026

Lukhan Salakaia-Loto (formerly Lukhan Tui, born 19 September 1996), is an Australian rugby union player. He plays for the Queensland Reds in Super Rugby, and his usual position is lock but he has also played in the backrow for the Australia national team particularly at blindside flanker.

== Family and early life ==
Lukhan Herman Lealaiauloto Tui was born to parents Herman Lealaiauloto [Ermehn] and Teresa Tuimaseve, his mother, at Otara, South Auckland in New Zealand before he moved with his mother to Sydney, Australia, at a young age.

He changed his name to Lukhan Salakaia-Loto later as an adult in 2018 following the death of the stepfather who had raised him, hyphenating Salakaia as the surname of his late stepfather, mother and siblings with Loto from part of his birth father's last name. Lukhan's Samoan bloodline comes from the villages of Lelepa in Savaii and Faleula in Upolu.

Lukhan attended John Edmondson High School in Liverpool, Australia. He initially played junior rugby league and was selected in age-group teams for Western Suburbs, and NSW Samoa.

== Rugby career ==
He joined the Randwick club in 2014 to play rugby union for their colts side. In 2015, he played for Randwick's first grade Shute Shield team, and was named (as Lukhan Lealaiaulolo-Tui) for the Australia under-20 team that played in the World Junior Championship in Italy.

Later in 2015, he signed a three-year deal with the Queensland Reds. Tui made his Super Rugby debut for the Reds against the Bulls in Pretoria on 16 April 2016.

He was selected in the Queensland Country squad for the National Rugby Championship in 2015, but did not play for that side due to injury. He made his NRC debut the following season for the Brisbane City team.

In 2017, national coach Michael Cheika named Lukhan Tui on the bench for Australia in the match against South Africa at Bloemfontein, and he made his international debut on 30 September 2017, replacing Adam Coleman after the first hour in a 27-all tied test.

On 1 March 2022, it was confirmed that Salakaia-Loto would move to England to join Northampton Saints in the Premiership Rugby ahead of the 2022-23 season.

In January 2023, Salakaia-Loto was suspended for four weeks following his sending-off for dangerous play in a Champions Cup match against La Rochelle.

After spending the 2024 season with Melbourne Rebels, he returned to the Reds for 2025.

== Super Rugby statistics ==
As of 8 June 2023

Season	Team	Games	Starts	Sub	Mins	Tries	Cons	Pens	Drops	Points	Yel	Red
2016	Reds	4	1	3	86	0	0	0	0	0	0	0
2017	Reds	9	6	3	422	0	0	0	0	0	0	0
2018	Reds	6	4	2	348	0	0	0	0	0	1	0
2019	Reds	15	14	1	1,028	0	0	0	0	0	1	0
2020	Reds	7	6	1	437	2	0	0	0	10	0	0
2020 AU	Reds	10	10	0	725	1	0	0	0	5	0	0
2021 AU	Reds	7	7	0	557	1	0	0	0	5	0	0
2021 TT	Reds	5	4	1	349	0	0	0	0	0	0	0
2022	Reds	6	4	2	281	0	0	0	0	0	0	0
Total		69	56	13	4,233	4	0	0	0	20	2	0
