= Efi Ma'afu =

- Born: Efitusi Ma'afu; 23 January 1998 (age 28) New Zealand
- Height: 178 cm (5 ft 10 in)
- Weight: 108 kg (238 lb; 17 st 0 lb)

Rugby union career
- Position: Hooker
Senior career
Years	Team	Apps	(Points)
2017–2019	Queensland Country	12	(15)
2021	Canon Eagles	3	(0)
2022–	Rouen		
- Correct as of 30 May 2022
Super Rugby
Years	Team	Apps	(Points)
2019	Reds	0	(0)
2020	Sunwolves	5	(5)
2020	Rebels	9	(0)
2022	Rebels	7	(0)
- Correct as of 30 May 2022

Efi Ma'afu (born 23 January 1998) is an Australian rugby union player who plays for the Queensland Reds in Super Rugby. His playing position is hooker. He has signed for the Reds squad in 2019.

== Super Rugby statistics ==
As of 30 May 2022

Season	Team	Games	Starts	Sub	Mins	Tries	Cons	Pens	Drops	Points	Yel	Red
2019	Reds	0	0	0	0	0	0	0	0	0	0	0
2020	Sunwolves	5	2	3	187	1	0	0	0	5	0	0
2020 AU	Rebels	9	0	9	140	0	0	0	0	0	0	0
2022	Rebels	7	0	7	193	0	0	0	0	0	1	0
Total		21	2	19	520	1	0	0	0	5	1	0
