= Esei Ha'angana =

Australian rugby union player (born 1999)

Esei Ha'angana エセイ・ハアンガナ
- Born: 21 April 1999 (age 27) Sydney, New South Wales, Australia
- Height: 198 cm (6 ft 6 in)
- Weight: 120 kg (260 lb; 18 st 13 lb)
- School: St Pauls Catholic College

Rugby union career
- Position(s): Lock, Flanker
- Current team: Urayasu D-Rocks
Amateur team(s)
Years	Team	Apps	(Points)
2017–2019	Randwick	5	(0)
Senior career
Years	Team	Apps	(Points)
2017–2019	Melbourne Rising	17	(0)
2017–2020	Rebels	15	(0)
2021–2026	Panasonic Wild Knights	62	(65)
2026–	Urayasu D-Rocks		
- Correct as of 6 June 2026
International career
Years	Team	Apps	(Points)
2016	Australian Schoolboys	2	(0)
2019	Australia U20	6	(0)
2026	Japan XV	1	(0)
2026–	Japan	5	(5)
- Correct as of 17 July 2026
Medal record
Men's rugby union
Representing Australia
Oceania U20 Championship
Winner	2019 Gold Coast
Junior World Cup
Runner-up	2019 Argentina

Esei Ha'angana (born 21 April 1999) is a professional rugby union player who plays as a lock for the Saitama Wild Knights in the Japan Rugby League One (JRLO). Born in Sydney, Australia, Ha'angana represents the Japan national team at international level, qualifying on residency grounds.

Ha'angana began his rugby career in Australia, making his professional debut at 18-years-old for the Melbourne Rebels in the Super Rugby. At the time of his debut he was the youngest ever player to play for the club.

== Career ==
Ha'angana made his debut for the Rebels against the Sharks as a late bench replacement for Colby Fainga'a before replacing Amanaki Mafi in the 5th minute. Ha'angana was the clubs youngest ever player to make a cap, being 18 years and 1 day old. The match finished as a 9-all draw in Durban.

Ha'angana went on to make 15 appearances for the Rebels across five seasons.

== International career ==
Being born in Australia to Tongan parents, Ha'angana is eligible to represent both countries internationally. In late 2024, he stated his intention to represent Japan if given the opportunity.

In July 2026, Ha'angana was scheduled to make his Test debut against France in the 2026 Nations Championship for Japan.

== Super Rugby statistics ==
As of 12 September 2020

Season	Team	Games	Starts	Sub	Mins	Tries	Cons	Pens	Drops	Points	Yel	Red
2017	Rebels	5	0	5	48	0	0	0	0	0	0	0
2018	Rebels	0	0	0	0	0	0	0	0	0	0	0
2019	Rebels	2	0	2	27	0	0	0	0	0	0	0
2020	Rebels	0	0	0	0	0	0	0	0	0	0	0
2020 AU	Rebels	4	1	3	98	0	0	0	0	0	0	0
Total		11	1	10	173	0	0	0	0	0	0	0
