= Daymon Leasuasu =

New Zealand rugby union player

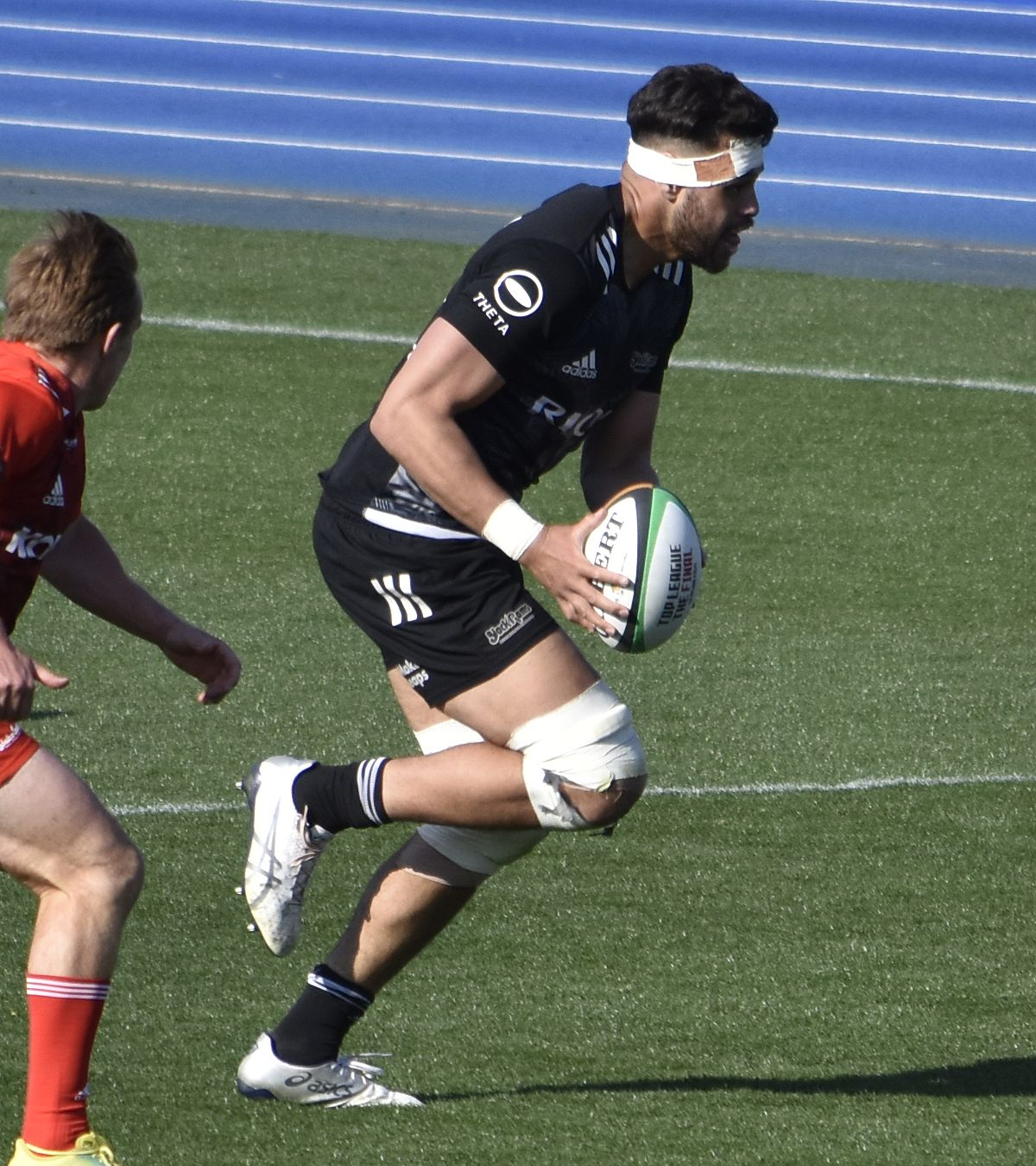
- Born: 20 January 1993 (age 33) Christchurch, New Zealand
- Height: 1.99 m (6 ft 6 in)
- Weight: 115 kg (18 st 2 lb; 254 lb)

Rugby union career
- Position: Lock
- Current team: Kurita Water Gush
Senior career
Years	Team	Apps	(Points)
2018–2019	Counties Manukau	14	(5)
2020–2022	Ricoh Black Rams	13	(0)
2022-	Kurita Water Gush	32	(30)
- Correct as of 21 February 2021
Super Rugby
Years	Team	Apps	(Points)
2019	Chiefs	2	(0)
- Correct as of 21 February 2021

Daymon Leasuasu (born in New Zealand on 20 January 1993) is a New Zealand rugby union player who plays for the Chiefs in Super Rugby. His playing position is lock. He was named in the Chiefs squad for week 3 in 2019.
