= Anaru Rangi =

- Born: 19 October 1988 (age 38) Upper Hutt, Wellington, New Zealand
- Height: 1.81 m (5 ft 11 in)
- Weight: 117 kg (18 st 6 lb; 258 lb)

Rugby union career
- Position: Hooker
Senior career
| Years | Team | Apps | (Points) |
| 2015–2017 | Perth Spirit | 17 | (20) |
| 2016–2017 | Force | 9 | (0) |
| 2018–2020 | Rebels | 35 | (35) |
| 2018–2019 | Melbourne Rising | 12 | (15) |
| 2020–2022 | NTT Communications Shining Arcs | 10 | (10) |
| 2022 | Bay of Plenty | 11 | (0) |
| 2023 | Rebels | 2 | (0) |
- Correct as of 3 June 2023

Anaru Rangi (born 19 October 1988) is a New Zealand-born rugby union footballer who plays as a hooker for the Melbourne Rebels in Super Rugby.

== Super Rugby statistics ==
As of 3 June 2023

| Season | Team | Games | Starts | Sub | Mins | Tries | Cons | Pens | Drops | Points | Yel | Red |
|---|---|---|---|---|---|---|---|---|---|---|---|---|
| 2016 | Force | 5 | 0 | 5 | 43 | 0 | 0 | 0 | 0 | 0 | 0 | 0 |
| 2017 | Force | 4 | 0 | 4 | 74 | 0 | 0 | 0 | 0 | 0 | 0 | 0 |
| 2018 | Rebels | 15 | 13 | 2 | 934 | 1 | 0 | 0 | 0 | 5 | 0 | 0 |
| 2019 | Rebels | 14 | 12 | 2 | 767 | 3 | 0 | 0 | 0 | 15 | 0 | 0 |
| 2020 | Rebels | 6 | 5 | 1 | 336 | 3 | 0 | 0 | 0 | 15 | 0 | 0 |
| 2020 AU | Rebels | 0 | 0 | 0 | 0 | 0 | 0 | 0 | 0 | 0 | 0 | 0 |
| 2023 | Rebels | 2 | 0 | 2 | 40 | 0 | 0 | 0 | 0 | 0 | 0 | 0 |
| Total | | 46 | 30 | 16 | 2,194 | 7 | 0 | 0 | 0 | 35 | 0 | 0 |
