= Stu Dunbar =

Australian rugby union player

- Born: Stuart Dunbar; 5 February 1996 (age 30) Australia
- Height: 177 cm (5 ft 10 in)
- Weight: 80 kg (12 st 8 lb; 180 lb)

Rugby union career
- Position: Fly-half
Senior career
Years	Team	Apps	(Points)
2014	Sydney Stars	8	(11)
2017	Greater Sydney Rams	5	(10)
Super Rugby
Years	Team	Apps	(Points)
2019	Rebels	1	(0)
International career
Years	Team	Apps	(Points)
2019–	Australia Sevens		

Stu Dunbar (born 5 February 1996) is an Australian rugby union player who plays for the Rebels in the Super Rugby competition. His position of choice is fly-half.

Dunbar played for Sydney University before going to Europe and spending a season with Italian club, Verona Rugby, in 2016. He made his international sevens debut for Australia at the 2020 USA Sevens.

In 2022, He was part of the Australian team that won the London Sevens. They went on to win the 2021–22 World Rugby Sevens Series title. A month later he competed at the Oceania Sevens Championship in New Zealand. He was then selected for the Australian squad for the Rugby World Cup Sevens in Cape Town.

== Super Rugby statistics ==
As of 16 June 2019

Season	Team	Games	Starts	Sub	Mins	Tries	Cons	Pens	Drops	Points	Yel	Red
2019	Rebels	1	0	1	1	0	0	0	0	0	0	0
Total		1	0	1	1	0	0	0	0	0	0	0
