= Ruan Smith =

South African rugby union player

- Born: Ruan-Henry Smith; 24 January 1990 (age 36) Vryburg, South Africa
- Height: 1.88 m (6 ft 2 in)
- Weight: 123 kg (19 st 5 lb)
- School: Paarl Gimnasium
- Notable relative: JP Smith (twin brother)

Rugby union career
- Position: Loosehead Prop
- Current team: Lions / Golden Lions
Senior career
Years	Team	Apps	(Points)
2014	Canberra Vikings	6	(0)
2015−2018	Toyota Verblitz	29	(25)
2018–2019	Brisbane City	10	(0)
2021	LA Giltinis	0	(0)
2022–2024	Lions	22	(5)
- Correct as of 18 June 2024
Provincial / State sides
Years	Team	Apps	(Points)
2010	Western Province	1	(0)
2022–2024	Golden Lions	12	(0)
Super Rugby
Years	Team	Apps	(Points)
2012	Force	2	(0)
2013–2016	Brumbies	51	(0)
2018–2019	Reds	27	(0)
2020	Rebels	3	(0)
2021	Reds	1	(0)
2022	Waratahs	7	(0)
- Correct as of 21 June 2022

Ruan-Henry Smith (born 24 January 1990) is a South African professional rugby union player currently signed to the New South Wales Waratahs of Super Rugby in Australia for Super Rugby Pacific. His regular playing position is Loosehead Prop.

Smith previously played for the Melbourne Rebels team in Super Rugby. Smith is the twin brother of JP Smith who is also a professional rugby player.

== Rugby career ==
Smith made his Super Rugby debut for the Force during the 2012 Super Rugby season. He previously played for Western Province in South Africa's Vodacom Cup.

Smith played four seasons at the Brumbies in Super Rugby after being signed to their extended playing squad in 2013 Super Rugby season.

Smith went to Japan after 2013 Super Rugby season where he played three seasons with Toyota Verblitz. He initially signed with the Tokyo-based Sunwolves for the 2018 Super Rugby season but, after his mother fell ill, he was released on compassionate grounds and returned to his home in Brisbane where he joined his twin brother Jean-Pierre at the Queensland Reds.

In 2020, Smith signed to his fourth Super Rugby club with the Melbourne Rebels, and after a stint with the LA Giltinis in 2021, Smith was announced in October 2021 as a new signing for the NSW Waratahs for the upcoming 2022 season.

== Super Rugby statistics ==
As of 12 September 2020

Season	Team	Games	Starts	Sub	Mins	Tries	Cons	Pens	Drops	Points	Yel	Red
2012	Force	2	0	2	20	0	0	0	0	0	0	0
2013	Brumbies	8	0	8	131	0	0	0	0	0	0	0
2014	Brumbies	16	1	15	265	0	0	0	0	0	1	0
2015	Brumbies	18	1	17	438	0	0	0	0	0	0	0
2016	Brumbies	9	4	5	353	0	0	0	0	0	0	0
2018	Reds	11	1	10	268	0	0	0	0	0	0	0
2019	Reds	16	3	13	395	0	0	0	0	0	0	0
2020	Rebels	3	2	1	133	0	0	0	0	0	0	0
2020 AU	Reds	1	0	1	27	0	0	0	0	0	0	0
Total		83	12	71	2066	0	0	0	0	0	1	0
