= Mees Erasmus =

South African rugby union player

- Born: Johan Mees Erasmus; 16 September 1994 (age 32) Johannesburg, South Africa
- Height: 183 cm (6 ft 0 in)
- Weight: 120 kg (18 st 13 lb; 260 lb)

Rugby union career
- Position: Prop
Amateur team(s)
Years	Team	Apps	(Points)
2015–2019	Palmyra R.F.C.		
Senior career
Years	Team	Apps	(Points)
2014-2015	Natal Sharks	3	(0)
2016–2017	Perth Spirit	9	(5)
2018	Melbourne Rising	5	(0)
2020–	Valence d'Agen		
Super Rugby
Years	Team	Apps	(Points)
2018	Brumbies	1	(0)
2019–2020	Rebels	0	(0)

Mees Erasmus (born 16 September 1994) is a South African rugby union player who plays for the Melbourne Rebels inn the Super Rugby competition. His position of choice is prop.

== Super Rugby statistics ==
As of 27 May 2020

Season	Team	Games	Starts	Sub	Mins	Tries	Cons	Pens	Drops	Points	Yel	Red
2018	Brumbies	1	0	1	8	0	0	0	0	0	0	0
2019	Rebels	0	0	0	0	0	0	0	0	0	0	0
2020	Rebels	0	0	0	0	0	0	0	0	0	0	0
Total		1	0	1	8	0	0	0	0	0	0	0
