= Jonathan Ruru =

- Born: 2 February 1993 (age 33) Napier, New Zealand
- Height: 184 cm (6 ft 0 in)
- Weight: 94 kg (207 lb; 14 st 11 lb)
- School: Napier Boys' High School
- Notable relative: Michael Ruru (brother)

Rugby union career
- Position: Half-back
- Current team: Oyonnax
Senior career
| Years | Team | Apps | (Points) |
| 2015 | Hawke's Bay | 1 | (0) |
| 2016–2017 | Otago | 21 | (15) |
| 2018–2021 | Blues | 46 | (10) |
| 2018–2021 | Auckland | 37 | (30) |
| 2021–2023 | Provence Rugby | 24 | (15) |
| 2023– | Oyonnax | 18 | (10) |
- Correct as of 7 December 2023
International career
| Years | Team | Apps | (Points) |
| 2017-2019 | New Zealand Māori All Blacks | 3 | (0) |
- Correct as of 26 July 2020
National sevens team
| Years | Team | | Comps |
| 2016 | New Zealand | | 2 |
- Correct as of 26 July 2020

Jonathan Ruru (born 2 February 1993) is a New Zealand rugby union player who plays for Oyonnax in the French Top 14. His position of choice is scrum-half. He is the younger brother of Vannes player Michael Ruru. Ruru has represented the New Zealand Maori All Blacks and The New Zealand All Black Sevens Teams.

A Hawkes Bay product, Ruru played just 1 game for his home provence, before finding an opportunity in an injury-hit Otago team in 2016 where he became a regular halfback in the Mitre 10 Cup.

He also earned a trial for the New Zealand Sevens, making the squad for two tournaments in 2016. He continued as a regular in 2017 impressing to earn a contract with the Blues, following his older brother who played for the Western Force and Melbourne Rebels.

Ruru's form in the Mitre 10 Cup (NPC) and Super rugby earned him selection for the New Zealand Maori All Blacks team in 2017,18 and 19 and he was also part of the 2018 premiership winning Auckland Mitre10 Cup(NPC) team and the 2021 Super Rugby TT championship BLUES team.
