= Sam Jeffries (rugby union, born 1992) =

Australian rugby union player

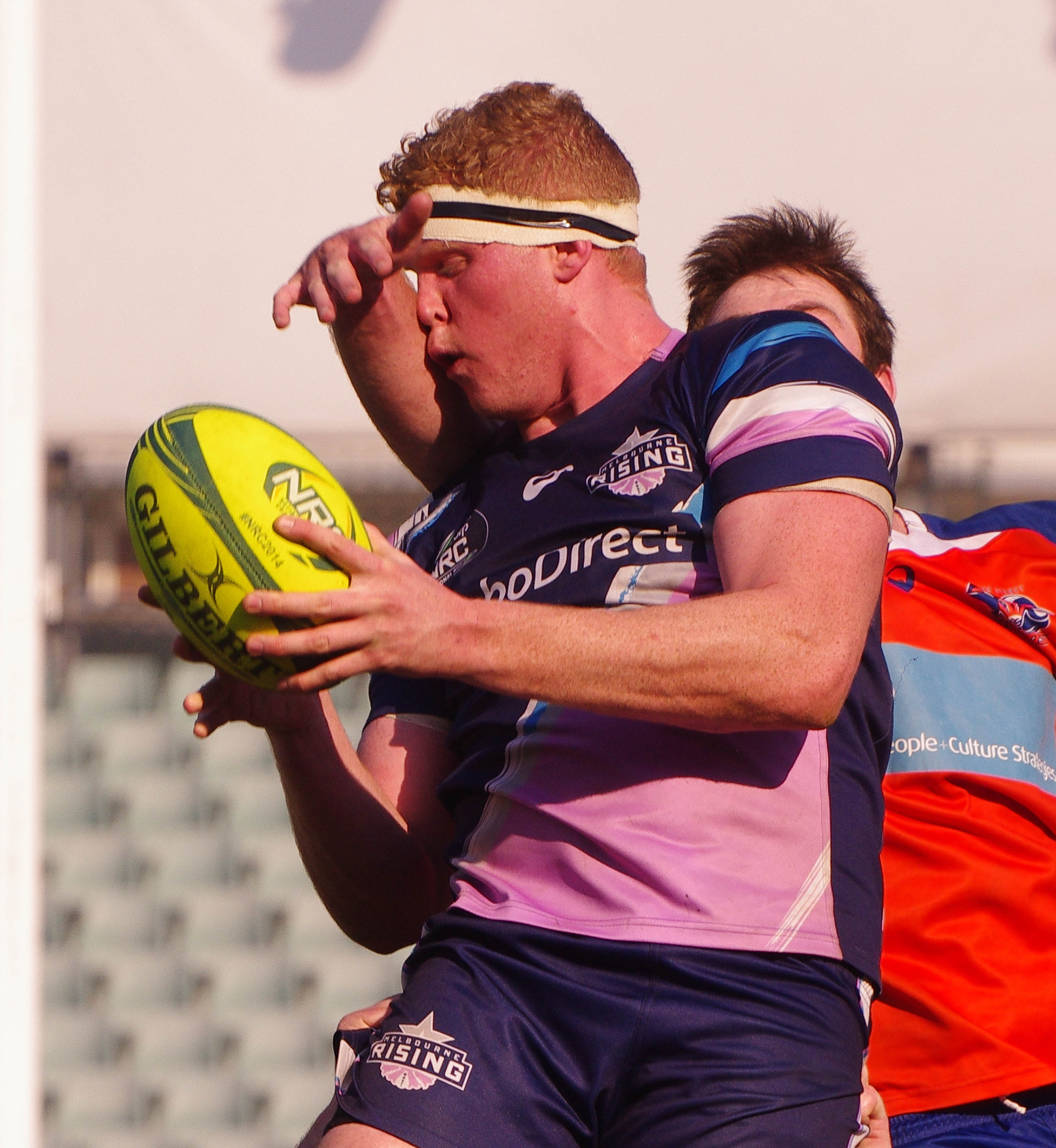
- Jeffries in 2014
- Full name: Sam Jeffries
- Born: 20 May 1992 (age 34) Brisbane, Australia
- Height: 2.00 m (6 ft 7 in)
- Weight: 120 kg (18 st 13 lb; 265 lb)
- School: St Joseph's College, Nudgee
- University: Sydney University

Rugby union career
- Position: Lock
- Current team: Suntory Sungoliath
Amateur team(s)
Years	Team	Apps	(Points)
2012	Sydney University	8	(10)
2013	Melbourne University		
Senior career
Years	Team	Apps	(Points)
2014–2019	Rebels	25	(0)
2014−2016	Melbourne Rising	25	(22)
2018–2021 2023–2024	NEC Green Rockets	31	(10)
2021–2023	NTT Communications Shining Arcs	11	(0)
2024–2025	Kintetsu Liners	11	(5)
2025–	Suntory Sungoliath	1	(0)
- Correct as of 21 February 2021
International career
Years	Team	Apps	(Points)
2012	Australia Under 20		
- Correct as of 25 May 2014

Sam Jeffries (born 20 May 1992) is an Australian rugby union player who currently plays as a lock for the NEC Green Rockets in the Japan Top League and previously played as a lock for the Melbourne Rebels in the Super Rugby competition since 2014.

== Early life and career ==
Despite being born and raised in Queensland, Jeffries initially made a name for himself playing for Sydney University in the Shute Shield. His performances at that level won him a spot in the Melbourne Rebels extended playing squad for the 2014 Super Rugby season.

He suffered injury problems during the early part of his career in Melbourne, however he regained full fitness towards the end of the season and made his debut off the replacements bench in the Rebels final match of the campaign, a 40–7 defeat by the Bulls in Pretoria.

Following the departures of experienced second-row forwards Hugh Pyle and Chris Thomson at the conclusion of the 2014 season, the Rebels announced that Jeffries would be a part of their first-team squad for at least the next 2 years. Sam will be playing for the NEC Green Rockets in Japan before returning to the Melbourne Rebels in 2019.

== International career ==
Jeffries represented Australia Under 20 at the 2012 IRB Junior World Championship in South Africa.

== Super Rugby statistics ==
As of 16 June 2019

Season	Team	Games	Starts	Sub	Mins	Tries	Cons	Pens	Drops	Points	Yel	Red
2014	Rebels	1	0	1	4	0	0	0	0	0	0	0
2015	Rebels	4	0	4	111	0	0	0	0	0	0	0
2016	Rebels	11	2	9	213	0	0	0	0	0	0	0
2017	Rebels	0	0	0	0	0	0	0	0	0	0	0
2018	Rebels	3	0	3	35	0	0	0	0	0	0	0
2019	Rebels	2	0	2	14	0	0	0	0	0	0	0
Total		21	2	19	377	0	0	0	0	0	0	0
