= Maile Ngauamo =

Tongan rugby union player

- Born: 15 August 1993 (age 33) Tonga
- Height: 182 cm (6 ft 0 in)
- Weight: 103 kg (227 lb; 16 st 3 lb)

Rugby union career
- Position: Hooker
Senior career
| Years | Team | Apps | (Points) |
| 2015 | Greater Sydney Rams | 6 | (0) |
| 2018– | Brisbane City | 4 | (5) |
- Correct as of 23 May 2019
Super Rugby
| Years | Team | Apps | (Points) |
| 2019– | Brumbies | 0 | (0) |
- Correct as of 23 May 2019

Maile Ngauamo (born 15 August 1993 in Tonga) is a Tongan rugby union player who plays for the Brumbies in Super Rugby. His playing position is hooker. He was announced as a replacement signing in May 2019.
