= Seb Wileman =

Australian rugby union player

- Born: 13 March 1993 (age 33) Australia
- Height: 193 cm (6 ft 4 in)
- Weight: 98 kg (216 lb; 15 st 6 lb)

Rugby union career
- Position: Centre
Senior career
Years	Team	Apps	(Points)
2016	Sydney Rays	6	(6)
2017–	NSW Country Eagles	10	(15)
- Correct as of 1 May 2019
Super Rugby
Years	Team	Apps	(Points)
2019–	Reds	1	(0)
- Correct as of 1 May 2019

Seb Wileman (born 13 March 1993 in Australia) is an Australian rugby union player who plays for the Queensland Reds in Super Rugby. His playing position is centre. He was named in the Reds squad for week 12 in 2019.

PLAYING HISTORY

2019 Queensland Reds Super Rugby; QPR Brothers Rugby Club

2018 NSW Country Eagles; NRC Warringah Rats; NSW Shute Shield Grand Finalists

2017 NSW Country Eagles; NRC Warringah Rats; NSW Shute Shield Champions

2016 Sydney Rays; NRC Warringah Rats; NSW Shute Shield; Shute Shield 'Rookie of the Year' Nominee

2015 Warringah Rats; NSW Shute Shield

2014 Warringah Rats; NSW Shute Shield

2013 Warringah Rats; NSW Shute Shield

Junior Rugby Wahroonga Tigers Gordon Junior Representative Sides
