= Lausii Taliauli =

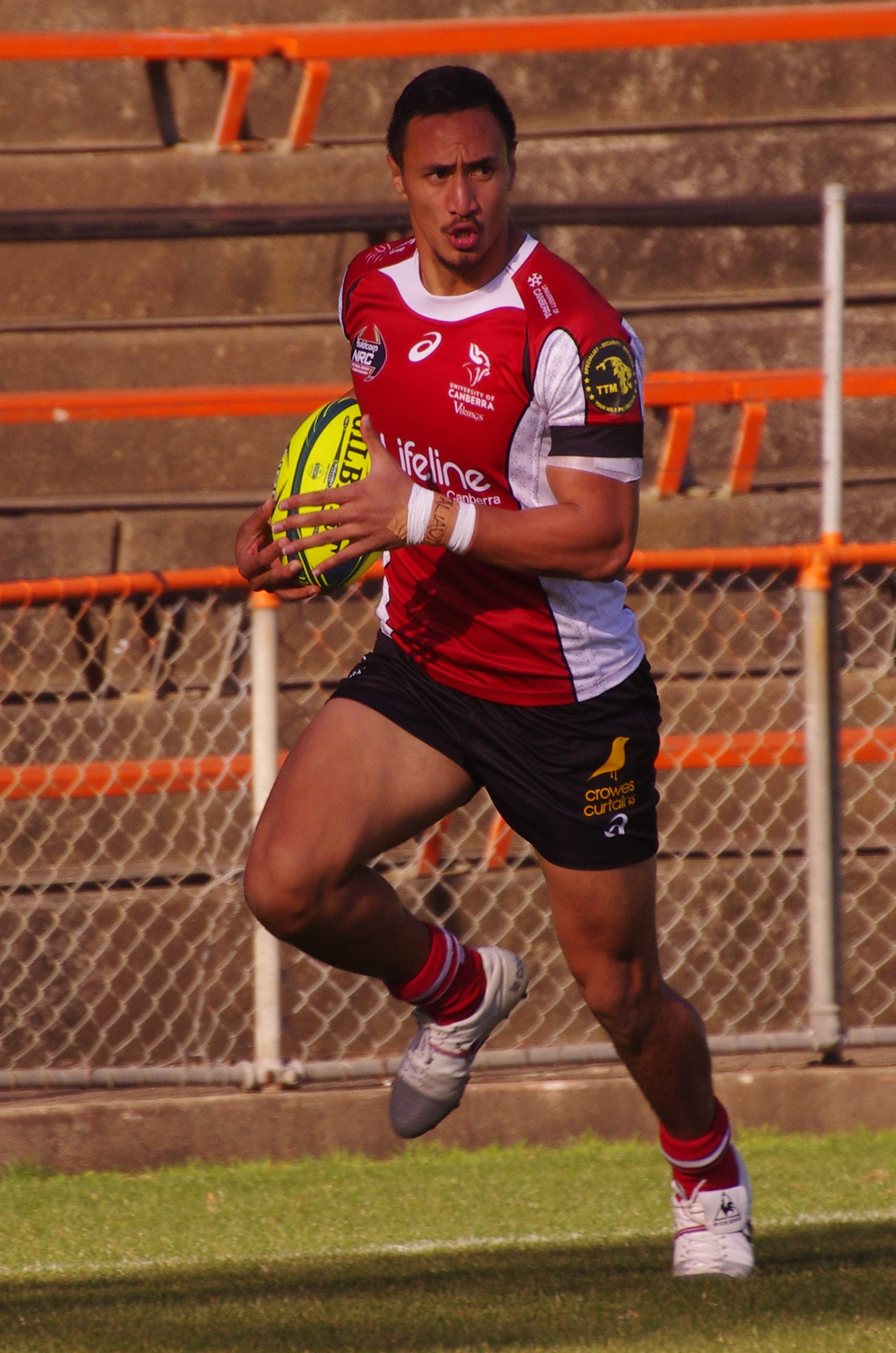
- Taliauli during a match for Canberra Vikings, September 2014
- Born: 8 June 1993 (age 33) Wellington, New Zealand
- Height: 193 cm (6 ft 4 in)
- Weight: 101 kg (223 lb; 15 st 13 lb)
- School: The Southport School

Rugby union career
- Position: Wing
- Current team: Southland
Senior career
Years	Team	Apps	(Points)
2014–2018	Canberra Vikings	27	(57)
2015–2019	Brumbies	25	(30)
2019–	Southland	5	(0)
- Correct as of 27 May 2020
National sevens team
Years	Team		Comps
2014	Australia		2
- Correct as of 27 May 2020

Lausii Taliauli (born 8 June 1993) is a New Zealand-born Australian rugby union footballer who currently plays as a winger for the Brumbies in Super Rugby. He also represented the Canberra Vikings in the inaugural National Rugby Championship.

== Career ==
Born in New Zealand but raised on Australia's Gold Coast since the age of 14, Taliauli began to make strides in his rugby career playing for the famous Southport School. After graduation, he switched to rugby league and played for the Gold Coast Titans under-20 side for 2 years before concentrating on sevens rugby. Issues regarding his Australian citizenship saw him released to play for the Canberra Vikings for the latter part of the 2014 National Rugby Championship season. His pace and size made such an impact in Canberra that he was awarded a full-time contract with the Brumbies for the 2015 Super Rugby season.

== International career ==
Taliauli represented the Australia Sevens team in 2014.

== Super Rugby statistics ==
As of 25 July 2016

Season	Team	Games	Starts	Sub	Mins	Tries	Cons	Pens	Drops	Points	Yel	Red
2015	Brumbies	7	2	5	187	1	0	0	0	5	0	0
2016	Brumbies	8	1	7	147	2	0	0	0	10	0	0
Total		15	3	12	334	3	0	0	0	15	0	0
