= Scott Malolua =

Australian rugby union player

- Born: 11 June 1993 (age 33) Samoa
- Height: 168 cm (5 ft 6 in)
- Weight: 85 kg (187 lb; 13 st 5 lb)

Rugby union career
- Position: Scrum-half
Senior career
Years	Team	Apps	(Points)
2015–	Queensland Country	7	(5)
- Correct as of 22 May 2019
Super Rugby
Years	Team	Apps	(Points)
2019–	Reds	0	(0)
- Correct as of 22 May 2019
International career
Years	Team	Apps	(Points)
2019–	Samoa	1	(0)
- Correct as of 9 September 2019

Scott Malolua (born 11 June 1993 in Samoa) is a Samoan rugby union player who plays for the Queensland Reds in Super Rugby. His playing position is scrum-half. He was named in the Reds squad for week 15 in 2019.

He gave up his rugby career in 2018 to focus on his career as a carpenter.

He was selected for the Samoa national rugby union team for the 2019 Rugby World Cup. He made his international debut in a match against Australia, but suffered a shoulder injury which ruled him out for the world cup.
