= Brad Wilkin =

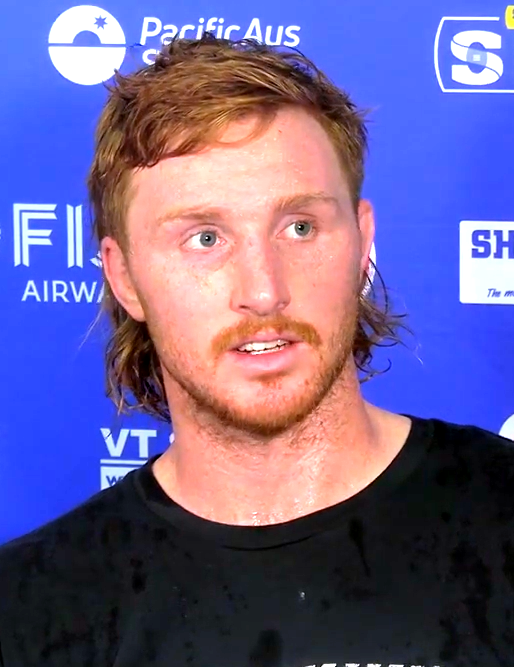
- Born: 8 December 1995 (age 30) Wellington, New South Wales, Australia
- Height: 187 cm (6 ft 2 in)
- Weight: 104 kg (16 st 5 lb; 229 lb)
- School: Iona College, QLD

Rugby union career
- Position: Flanker
- Current team: San Diego Legion
Amateur team(s)
Years	Team	Apps	(Points)
2016	Sydney University		
Senior career
Years	Team	Apps	(Points)
2015	Brisbane City	5	(0)
2018	NSW Country Eagles	0	(0)
2025-	San Diego Legion		
Super Rugby
Years	Team	Apps	(Points)
2017–2018	Waratahs	6	(5)
2019–2024	Rebels	49	(45)
International career
Years	Team	Apps	(Points)
2015	Australia U-20	1	(0)

Brad Wilkin (born 8 December 1995) is an Australian rugby union player who plays as a flanker for the San Diego Legion of Major League Rugby (MLR). He previously played for Rebels and has also represented Australia in the under-20s team.

== Super Rugby statistics ==
As of 3 June 2023

Season	Team	Games	Starts	Sub	Mins	Tries	Cons	Pens	Drops	Points	Yel	Red
2017	Waratahs	0	0	0	0	0	0	0	0	0	0	0
2018	Waratahs	6	0	6	83	1	0	0	0	5	0	0
2019	Rebels	5	3	2	260	0	0	0	0	0	0	0
2020	Rebels	0	0	0	0	0	0	0	0	0	0	0
2020 AU	Rebels	6	4	2	272	1	0	0	0	5	0	0
2021 AU	Rebels	4	2	2	158	0	0	0	0	0	0	0
2021 TT	Rebels	0	0	0	0	0	0	0	0	0	0	0
2022	Rebels	14	12	2	862	2	0	0	0	10	0	0
2023	Rebels	14	14	0	1,033	6	0	0	0	30	2	0
Total		49	35	14	2,668	10	0	0	0	50	2	0

== Honours ==
San Diego Legion

- All Major League Ruby first team (2025)
