= Michael Wells (rugby union) =

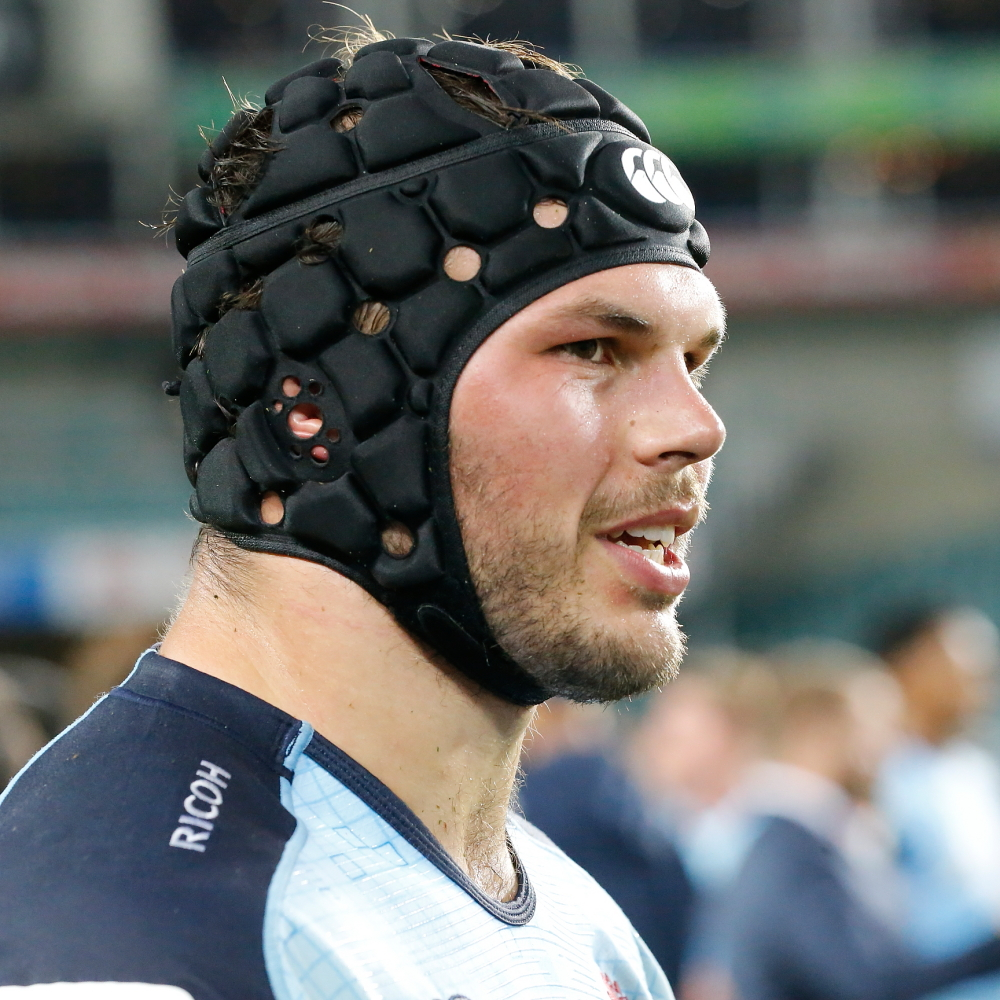
- Wells in 2017
- Born: 3 May 1993 (age 33) Sydney, New South Wales, Australia
- Height: 1.90 m (6 ft 3 in)
- Weight: 108 kg (17 st 0 lb; 238 lb)
- School: Saint Ignatius' College, Riverview

Rugby union career
- Position(s): Flanker, No. 8
Amateur team(s)
Years	Team	Apps	(Points)
2012–2024	Northern Suburbs	28	(35)
Senior career
Years	Team	Apps	(Points)
2014	North Harbour Rays	3	(5)
2016	Brumbies	7	(0)
2016	Sydney Rays	6	(6)
2017–2019	Waratahs	44	(25)
2020–2022	Rebels	39	(15)
2023–2024	Force	21	(25)
- Correct as of 1 June 2024
International career
Years	Team	Apps	(Points)
2011–2012	Australian Schoolboys		
2013	Australia U20	5	(5)
2014–2019	Australia sevens	26	(5)
- Correct as of 3 October 2019

Michael Wells (born 3 May 1993) is an Australian former rugby union player who played as a loose forward. Throughout his professional career, Wells played for four of Australia's five professional Super Rugby franchises. He began his career with the Brumbies in 2016, before switching to the New South Wales Waratahs for 2017. After three seasons with the Waratahs Wells signed with the Melbourne Rebels ahead of the 2020 season. He remained with the Rebels until 2023 where he switched to the Perth-based Western Force until his retirement in 2024.

Wells was an Australian schoolboys representative in 2011 and was also a member of the Australia under-20 side which competed in the 2013 IRB Junior World Championship in France. Since 2014, he has also turned out for the Australia Sevens side, debuting for them at the Gold Coast sevens in his homeland.

== Super Rugby statistics ==
As of 30 May 2022

Season	Team	Games	Starts	Sub	Mins	Tries	Cons	Pens	Drops	Points	Yel	Red
2016	Brumbies	7	2	5	310	0	0	0	0	0	0	0
2017	Waratahs	15	11	4	863	1	0	0	0	5	0	0
2018	Waratahs	18	18	0	1304	2	0	0	0	10	0	0
2019	Waratahs	11	10	1	773	2	0	0	0	10	0	0
2020	Rebels	6	3	3	271	0	0	0	0	0	0	0
2020 AU	Rebels	7	6	1	447	0	0	0	0	0	0	0
2021 AU	Rebels	8	8	0	640	2	0	0	0	10	0	0
2021 TT	Rebels	5	5	0	400	1	0	0	0	5	0	0
2022	Rebels	13	13	0	955	0	0	0	0	0	0	0
Total		90	76	14	5,963	8	0	0	0	40	0	0
