= JP Smith (rugby union, born 1990) =

South African rugby union player

Jean-Pierre Smith
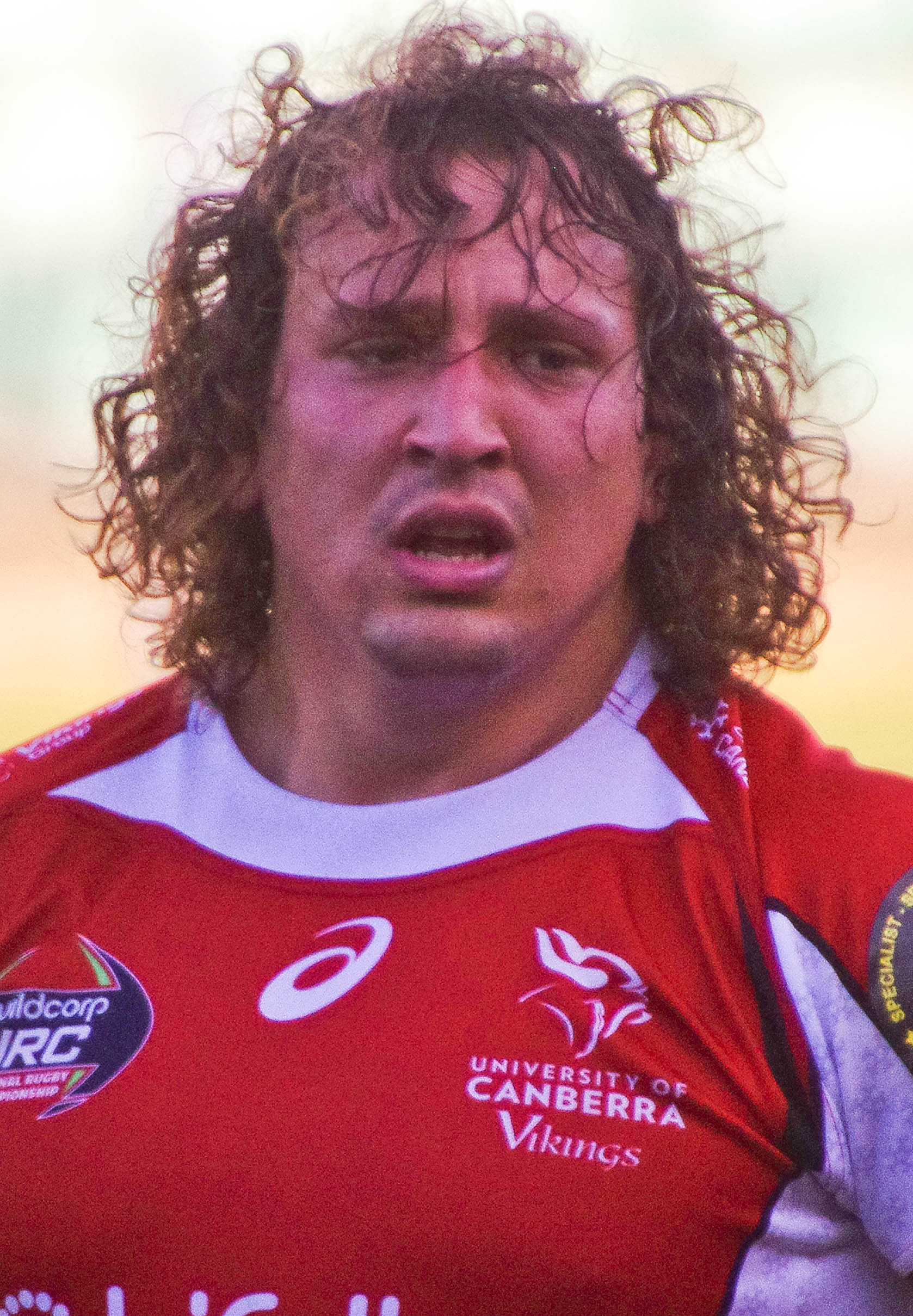
- Full name: Jean-Pierre Smith
- Born: 24 January 1990 (age 36) Vryburg, South Africa
- Height: 1.88 m (6 ft 2 in)
- Weight: 124 kg (19 st 7 lb; 273 lb)
- School: Paarl Gimnasium
- Notable relative: Ruan Smith (twin brother)

Rugby union career
- Position: Prop
- Current team: Lions / Golden Lions
Youth career
- 2009–2011: Western Province
Senior career
Years	Team	Apps	(Points)
2010	Western Province	5	(0)
2014–2015	Brumbies	24	(0)
2014	Canberra Vikings	8	(5)
2015–2016	Western Province	17	(0)
2016	Stormers	3	(0)
2018–2020	Reds	39	(5)
2021	LA Giltinis	12	(20)
2021–2024	Lions	49	(10)
2022–2024	Golden Lions	7	(0)
- Correct as of 18 June 2024

Jean-Pierre Smith (born 24 January 1990) is a South African professional rugby union player who plays as a prop for the LA Giltinis of Major League Rugby (MLR) in the United States.

Smith previously played prop for the Queensland Reds. He also played for Australian Super Rugby side the Brumbies and for the Canberra Vikings in the National Rugby Championship. Smith is the twin brother of Ruan Smith who is also a professional rugby player.

== Career ==
Smith started out his career playing for Western Province in South Africa, where he was a member of their youth system between 2009 and 2010 and also made five appearances during the 2010 Vodacom Cup season.

Smith emigrated to Australia along with twin-brother Ruan at the end of 2010 and were initially based in Brisbane, Australia. Both brothers linked up with the Australian National Academy and Jean-Pierre was a member of various development sides before heading south in 2013 to join the Brumbies. Although not named in either the regular or extended playing squads for the 2013 Super Rugby season, Smith was a member of the Brumbies group that traveled to South Africa and New Zealand for the Super Rugby semi-final and final. He didn't get any game time in 2013, but was named in their extended playing squad for 2014.

Smith made his Super Rugby debut on 7 March 2014 as a second-half replacement for Scott Sio as the Brumbies defeated the Hurricanes 29-21 in Wellington. Also in 2014, he played at the National Rugby Championship for Canberra Vikings.

=== Return to Western Province ===
In July 2015, it was announced that Smith would return to former side Western Province for the 2015 Currie Cup Premier Division campaign.
