= Jordan Jackson-Hope =

Australian rugby union player

- Born: 5 April 1996 (age 30) Canberra, Australia
- Height: 1.78 m (5 ft 10 in)
- Weight: 87 kg (13 st 10 lb; 192 lb)
- School: St Edmund's College, Canberra

Rugby union career
- Position: Fly-Half / Inside-Centre / Fullback
- Current team: New Orleans Gold
Amateur team(s)
Years	Team	Apps	(Points)
2015−	Tuggeranong Vikings		
Senior career
Years	Team	Apps	(Points)
2016–2019	Brumbies	15	(5)
2020	Sunwolves	1	(0)
2023–	New Orleans Gold	25	(44)
- Correct as of 28 December 2024
International career
Years	Team	Apps	(Points)
2014	Australia Schoolboys		
2016	Australia Under-20	4	(5)
- Correct as of 14 August 2016

Jordan Jackson-Hope (born 5 April 1996) is an Australian rugby union player who currently plays as an inside-centre or fly-Half for the Brumbies in the international Super Rugby competition. He also plays for the New Orleans Gold in Major League Rugby (MLR) in the U.S. He also plays the fullback position.

== Youth career ==
Born and bred in Canberra, Jackson-Hope attended school at St Edmund's College where his performances as captain of their 1st XV saw him named in both the ACT and Australian Schoolboys sides in 2014.

== Senior career ==
After leaving school, Jackson-Hope joined up with the Tuggeranong Vikings, a local side who compete in the ACTRU Premier Division. He appeared for both their under-20 and senior sides in 2015 and his form there saw him handed a development contract with Canberra-based Super Rugby franchise, the Brumbies.

Despite not being on a full-contract at the Brumbies, Jackson-Hope made his debut midway through the 2016 Super Rugby season in a match away to the Rebels in Melbourne. He made 2 substitute appearances in total during the campaign and scored 1 try.

== International ==
Jackson-Hope was selected as a member of the Australia under-20 squad which competed in the 2016 World Rugby Under 20 Championship in England where he made 4 appearances and scored 1 try.

== Super Rugby statistics ==
As of 14 August 2016

Season	Team	Games	Starts	Sub	Mins	Tries	Cons	Pens	Drops	Points	Yel	Red
2016	Brumbies	2	0	2	39	1	0	0	0	5	0	0
Total		2	0	2	39	1	0	0	0	5	0	0
