= Gavin Luka =

Australian rugby union player

- Born: 28 January 1997 (age 29) Australia
- Height: 188 cm (6 ft 2 in)
- Weight: 132 kg (291 lb; 20 st 11 lb)

Rugby union career
- Position: Prop
Senior career
Years	Team	Apps	(Points)
2018–	Queensland Country	0	(0)
- Correct as of 1 June 2019
Super Rugby
Years	Team	Apps	(Points)
2019–	Reds	1	(0)
- Correct as of 1 June 2019

Gavin Luka (born 28 January 1997 in Australia) is an Australian rugby union player who plays for the Queensland Reds in Super Rugby. His playing position is prop. He has signed for the Reds squad in 2019.
