= Bryce Hegarty =

Australian rugby union player (born 1992)

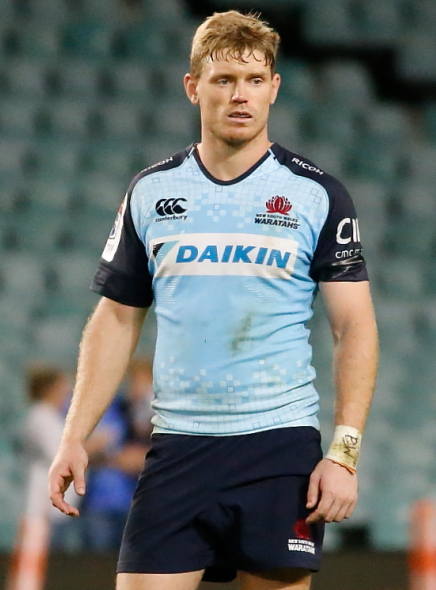
- Hegarty with the Waratahs in 2017
- Born: 28 August 1992 (age 34) Brisbane, Queensland, Australia
- Height: 185 cm (6 ft 1 in)
- Weight: 92 kg (203 lb; 14 st 7 lb)
- School: Marist College Ashgrove
- University: Queensland University of Technology
- Notable relative: Steve Hegarty (father)

Rugby union career
- Position(s): Fly-half, Fullback
- Current team: Kamaishi Seawaves
Senior career
Years	Team	Apps	(Points)
2013–2015	Melbourne Rebels	35	(49)
2015–2016	Toyota Industries Shuttles	12	(76)
2016–2018	Waratahs	33	(38)
2017	Sydney Rays	3	(14)
2018	Black Rams Tokyo	12	(76)
2019–2021	Reds	45	(222)
2019	Brisbane City	4	(23)
2021–2022	Leicester Tigers	17	(63)
2023	Force	6	(61)
2023–2025	Red Hurricanes Osaka	8	(67)
2026–	Kamaishi Seawaves	0	(0)
- Correct as of 31 August 2026

Bryce Hegarty (born 28 August 1992) is an Australian rugby union player who plays either as a fly-half or fullback. He currently plays for Western Force in Super Rugby. He previously played for the Queensland Reds, the Melbourne Rebels and the New South Wales Waratahs in Super Rugby, Toyota Industries Shuttles in Japan, and Leicester Tigers in England's Premiership Rugby.

Hegarty is the son of former Manly Sea Eagles player Steve Hegarty.

== Career ==
Hegarty played for the Brisbane Broncos Under-20 side for three seasons before moving south to Melbourne ahead of the 2013 Super Rugby season. He made his Rebels debut on 11 May 2013 in a 32–36 loss to the Blues in Auckland. The following week he made his first start with a win, against the Stormers at fly-half.

After the 2015 Super Rugby season, Hegarty joined Japanese Top League side Toyota Industries Shuttles for the 2015–16 season. He returned to Australia to play for the Waratahs in 2016. In the second game of the season in 2016 Hegarty tore his ACL and missed the remainder of the season for the Waratahs. He played the 2017 and 2018 seasons for the Waratahs, before moving to the Ricoh Black Rams for the 2018-19 season. He returned to Australia in 2019 to play a pivotal role for the Queensland Reds where he played three seasons. Winning the Super Rugby AU in 2021.

On 21 June 2021, Hegarty moved to Leicester Tigers in England's Premiership Rugby. On 30 October 2021, he made his debut for Leicester in the East Midlands Derby against Northampton Saints. Hegarty left Leicester on 13 November 2022 to chase the chance of playing in the Rugby World Cup for Australia. However, Hegarty made only 6 appearances for the Western Force before injury ruled him out for the remainder of the season. Hegarty then signed in Japan at NTT docomo in Osaka where he spent the following two seasons.

In August 2026, the Kamaishi Seawaves in the Japan Rugby League One, signed Hegarty ahead of their 2026–27 season.
