= Mitch Short =

Australian rugby union player

- Born: Mitchell Short; 25 May 1995 (age 31) Sydney, Australia
- Height: 1.77 m (5 ft 10 in)
- Weight: 82 kg (181 lb)
- School: The Scots College

Rugby union career
- Position: Scrum Half
- Current team: AS Béziers
Amateur team(s)
Years	Team	Apps	(Points)
2014-21	Randwick DRUFC		
Senior career
Years	Team	Apps	(Points)
2015–20	NSW Country Eagles	12	(10)
2021-2022	Racing 92	5	(0)
2022-2024	AS Béziers	34	(10)
2025	Chicago Hounds	12	(5)
- Correct as of 26 February 2026
Super Rugby
Years	Team	Apps	(Points)
2017	Force	3	(0)
2018-2020	Waratahs	17	(10)

Mitch Short is a retired Australian rugby union player who most recently played for Chicago Hounds in Major League Rugby.

Graduating from The Scots College, Sydney and representing Australian Schools in 2013, Mitch joined Randwick in 2014., Mitch has great speed off the mark and strong passing game, Mitch has great potential to make the step into rep rugby after he joined the Western Force during the 2017 season. Mitch signed with the NSW Waratahs in 2018 and made his run on debut for the club in Round 3 against the Sharks in Durban. His position of choice is scrum-half.
