= JP Sauni =

- Born: John Perelini Sauni; 7 July 1997 (age 29) Auckland, New Zealand
- Height: 180 cm (5 ft 11 in)
- Weight: 105 kg (16 st 7 lb; 231 lb)
- School: De La Salle College, Auckland NZ, Hallam College, Melbourne, Australia

Rugby union career
- Position: Hooker
Senior career
Years	Team	Apps	(Points)
2017	Auckland	1	(0)
Super Rugby
Years	Team	Apps	(Points)
2018–2021	Waratahs	0	(0)
International career
Years	Team	Apps	(Points)
2017	New Zealand U20s		

JP Sauni (born 7 July 1997) is a professional rugby union player who qualifies to play for New Zealand, Australia and Samoa. He plays for the Waratahs in the Super Rugby competition. His position of choice is hooker.
