= Pat Tafa =

Australian rugby union player

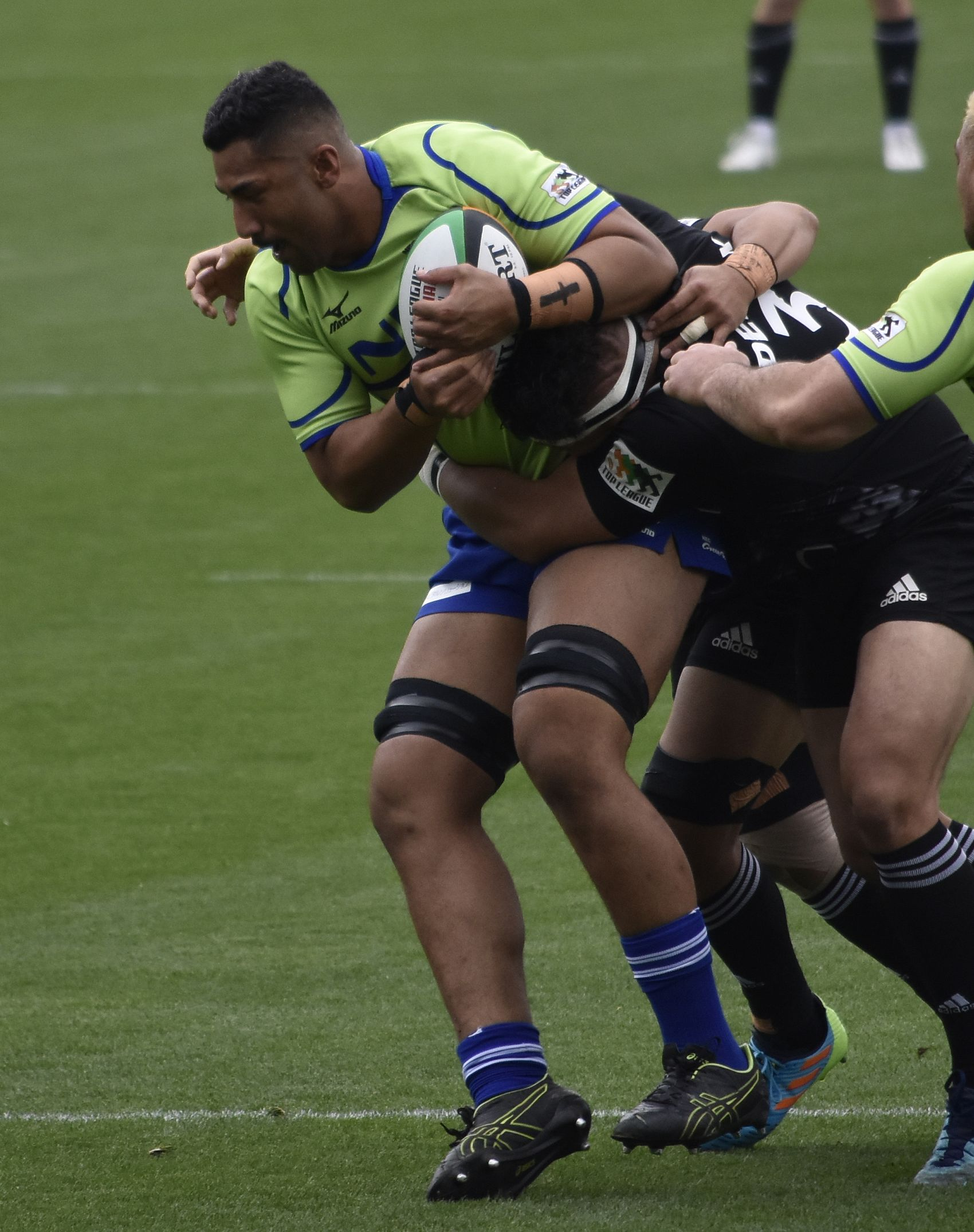
- Born: Patrick Tafa; 19 July 1999 (age 27) Australia
- Height: 195 cm (6 ft 5 in)
- Weight: 120 kg (260 lb; 18 st 13 lb)
- School: Brisbane State High School

Rugby union career
- Position(s): Lock, Flanker
- Current team: Kintetsu Liners
Senior career
Years	Team	Apps	(Points)
2018–2019	NSW Country Eagles	11	(0)
2020–2021	NEC Green Rockets	6	(5)
2021–	Kintetsu Liners	54	(80)
- Correct as of 21 February 2021
Super Rugby
Years	Team	Apps	(Points)
2019–2020	Waratahs	2	(0)
- Correct as of 21 February 2021
International career
Years	Team	Apps	(Points)
2018–2019	Australia U20	6	(0)
- Correct as of 21 February 2021

Pat Tafa (born 19 July 1999 in Australia) is an Australian rugby union player who plays for the New South Wales Waratahs in Super Rugby. His playing position is flanker. He has signed for the Waratahs squad in 2019.
