= Tom Staniforth =

Australian rugby union player

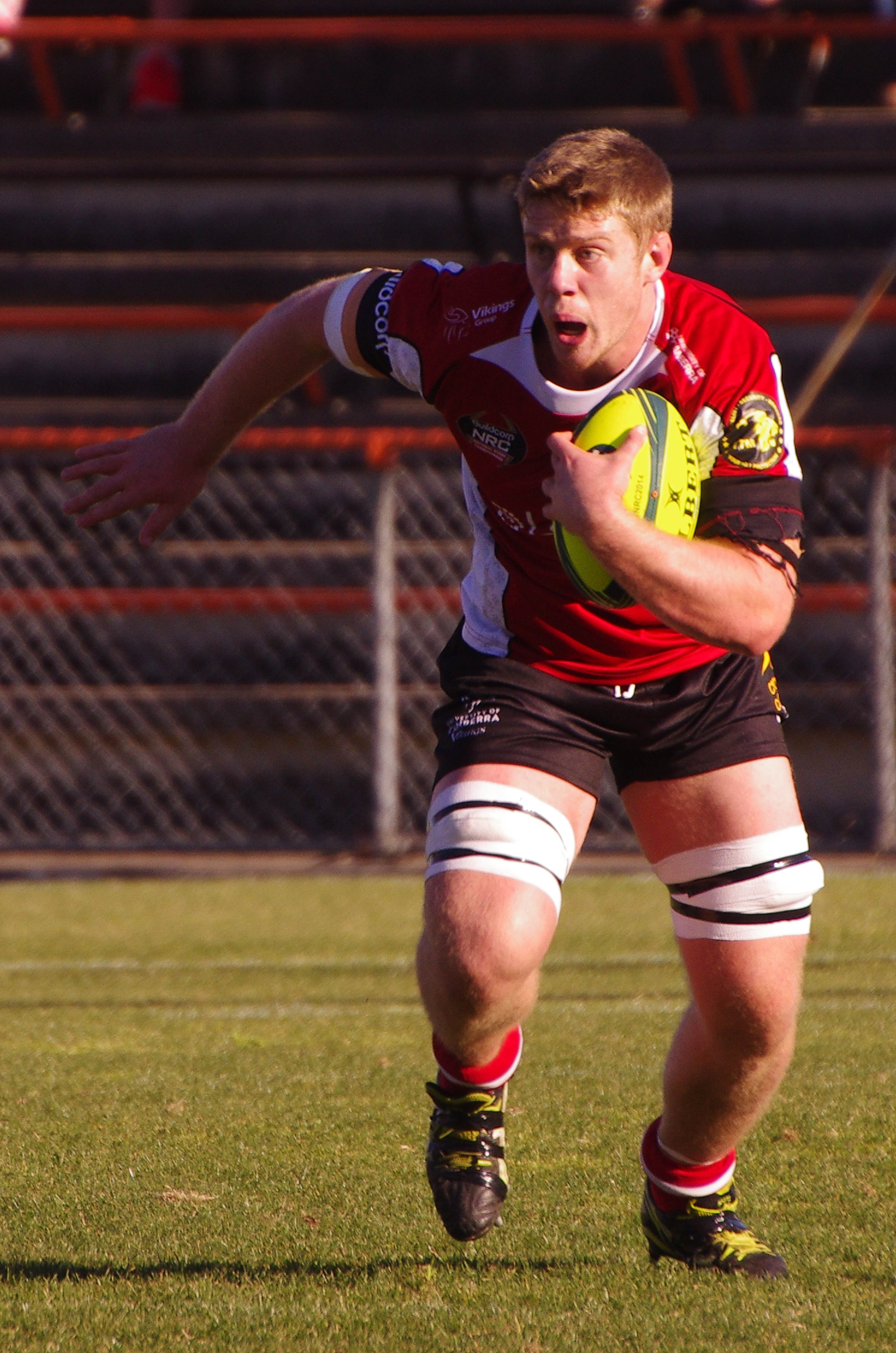
- Full name: Thomas Staniforth
- Born: 13 August 1994 (age 32) Canberra, Australia
- Height: 1.98 m (6 ft 6 in)
- Weight: 124 kg (19 st 7 lb; 273 lb)
- School: Canberra Grammar School
- Notable relative: Scott Staniforth (cousin)

Rugby union career
- Position: Lock
- Current team: Brumbies
Amateur team(s)
Years	Team	Apps	(Points)
2013	Canberra Royals		
2018-2020	Eastern Suburbs	16	(0)
Senior career
Years	Team	Apps	(Points)
2014–2017	Brumbies	22	(0)
2014–2016	Canberra Vikings	15	(5)
2015−2019	NSW Country Eagles	22	(0)
2018−2020	Waratahs	40	(10)
2021−	Castres Olympique	8	(0)
- Correct as of 20 May 2021
International career
Years	Team	Apps	(Points)
2013	Australia U20	5	(5)
2026	France	5	(0)
- Correct as of 20 May 2021

Tom Staniforth (born 13 August 1994) is a rugby union player who currently plays as a lock for French club Castres Olympique. He previously played for the Brumbies and Waratahs in Super Rugby.

Born in Australia, he represented Australia Under 20. In 2026 he was selected for France's Six Nations squad, qualifying after five years' residency in France.

== Career ==
Staniforth was involved in the Brumbies pre-season plans ahead of the 2014 Super Rugby season, however he was unable to win a contract with either then senior squad or the wider training group. As a result, he took up part-time work as a glass-collector to supplement his rugby earnings.

His big break came ahead of the Brumbies' clash with the Reds in Brisbane, when Staniforth was given a two-week contract to provide injury cover. He found himself named in the starting line-up for the match which his side won 23–20. Staniforth then signed a contract in May 2014 to tie him to the Brumbies until 2016.

From 2018 to 2020, he played for the Waratahs. He moved to Castres in 2021.

== International career ==
Staniforth was part of the Australia Under 20 side which competed in the 2013 IRB Junior World Championship in France. He was once again included the following year, also being named one of the vice-captains.

In January 2026 he was selected for France's Six Nations squad, qualifying after five years' residency in France.

== Super Rugby statistics ==
As of 22 July 2016

Season	Team	Games	Starts	Sub	Mins	Tries	Cons	Pens	Drops	Points	Yel	Red
2014	Brumbies	1	1	0	66	0	0	0	0	0	0	0
2015	Brumbies	0	0	0	0	0	0	0	0	0	0	0
2016	Brumbies	13	1	12	335	0	0	0	0	0	0	0
Total		14	2	12	401	0	0	0	0	0	0	0

== Honours ==
France

- 1x Six Nations Championship: 2026
