= BJ Edwards =

Australian rugby union player (born 1993)

- Born: Benjamin Edwards; 16 December 1993 (age 32) Australia
- Height: 198 cm (6 ft 6 in)
- Weight: 106 kg (234 lb; 16 st 10 lb)

Rugby union career
- Position: Flanker
Senior career
Years	Team	Apps	(Points)
2015	NSW Country Eagles	4	(0)
2016–2017	Cardiff Blues	3	(0)
2017–2018	Hartpury College	16	(5)
2018–	Canberra Vikings	7	(0)
- Correct as of 21 January 2019
Super Rugby
Years	Team	Apps	(Points)
2019–	Waratahs	0	(0)
- Correct as of 21 January 2019

BJ Edwards (born 16 December 1993 in Australia) is an Australian rugby union player who plays for the New South Wales Waratahs in Super Rugby. His playing position is flanker. He signed for the Waratahs squad in 2019.
