= Rory O'Connor (rugby union, born 1994) =

Australian rugby union player

- Born: 11 May 1994 (age 32) Australia
- Height: 183 cm (6 ft 0 in)
- Weight: 122 kg (269 lb; 19 st 3 lb)
- School: St Augustine's College, Sydney
- University: Sydney University
- Occupation: Professional Rugby Player

Rugby union career
- Position: Loose Head Prop
- Current team: Waratahs
Senior career
Years	Team	Apps	(Points)
2014–2016	Sydney Rays	15	(0)
2017	Melbourne Rising	8	(5)
2018–	Sydney Rays	3	(0)
- Correct as of 21 January 2019
Provincial / State sides
Years	Team	Apps	(Points)
- NSW
Super Rugby
Years	Team	Apps	(Points)
2017	Rebels	0	(0)
2019–	Waratahs	0	(0)
- Correct as of 21 January 2019

Rory O'Connor (born 11 May 1994 in Australia) is an Australian rugby union player of Irish descent, who plays for the New South Wales Waratahs in Super Rugby. His playing position is prop. He has signed for the Waratahs squad in 2019.
