= Cody Walker (rugby union) =

Australian rugby union player

- Born: 7 November 1997 (age 29) Australia
- Height: 184 cm (6 ft 0 in)
- Weight: 116 kg (256 lb; 18 st 4 lb)

Rugby union career
- Position: Prop
Amateur team(s)
Years	Team	Apps	(Points)
2018–	Eastern Suburbs	27	(15)
Senior career
Years	Team	Apps	(Points)
2018–2019	NSW Country Eagles	5	(0)
- Correct as of 20 October 2021
Super Rugby
Years	Team	Apps	(Points)
2018–2019	Waratahs	0	(0)
- Correct as of 20 October 2021
International career
Years	Team	Apps	(Points)
2017	Australia U20	5	(0)
- Correct as of 20 October 2021

Cody Walker (born 7 November 1997) is an Australian rugby union player who played for the New South Wales Waratahs in Super Rugby. His playing position is prop. He was signed for the Waratahs squad in 2019. Walker also represented NSW Country Eagles in the National Rugby Championship in 2018 and 2019, having come through the Waratahs youth systems. In 2017, he represented Australia U20.
