= Rory Suttor =

Australian rugby union player

- Born: 23 June 1998 (age 28) Australia
- Height: 190 cm (6 ft 3 in)
- Weight: 101 kg (223 lb; 15 st 13 lb)

Rugby union career
- Position: Flanker
Senior career
| Years | Team | Apps | (Points) |
| 2018– | NSW Country Eagles | 2 | (0) |
- Correct as of 21 January 2019
Super Rugby
| Years | Team | Apps | (Points) |
| 2019– | Waratahs | 0 | (0) |
- Correct as of 21 January 2019

Rory Suttor (born 23 June 1998 in Australia) is an Australian rugby union player who plays for the New South Wales Waratahs in Super Rugby. His playing position is flanker. He has signed for the Waratahs squad in 2019.
