= Irae Simone =

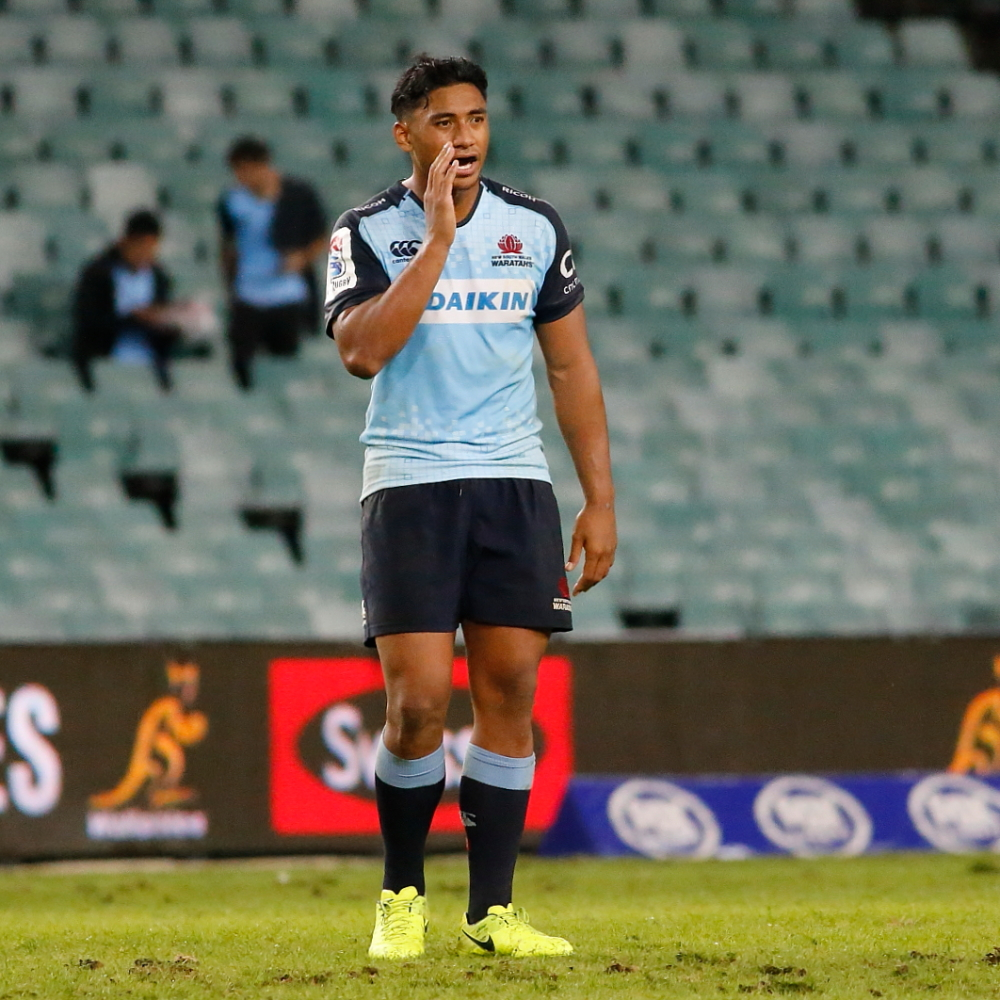
- Simone representing the Waratahs during Super Rugby, February 2017
- Born: 10 July 1995 (age 31) Auckland, New Zealand
- Height: 193 cm (6 ft 4 in)
- Weight: 105 kg (16 st 7 lb; 231 lb)
- School: Mount Albert Grammar School

Rugby union career
- Position(s): Centre, Fly-half
- Current team: AZ-COM Maruwa Momotaro's
Amateur team(s)
Years	Team	Apps	(Points)
2016–2018	Northern Suburbs	37	(102)
- Correct as of 16 July 2022
Senior career
Years	Team	Apps	(Points)
2016–2017	Sydney Rays	13	(41)
2017-2018	Waratahs	11	(0)
2018–2019	Canberra Vikings	15	(0)
2019–2022	Brumbies	60	(65)
2022–2026	Clermont	68	(35)
2026–	AZ-COM Maruwa Momotaro's	0	(0)
- Correct as of 16 July 2022
International career
Years	Team	Apps	(Points)
2020–2022	Australia	3	(0)
2026–	Samoa	1	(5)
- Correct as of 16 July 2022

Irae Simone (born 10 July 1995) is a New Zealand-born, Australian rugby union player who plays for ASM Clermont Auvergne in the French Top-14 competition. His position of choice is inside centre.

He stands at 193cm tall and weighs 105kg.

Simone made his professional debut for the Waratahs in the 2017 Super Rugby competition. He spent two seasons with the club before joining the Brumbies ahead of the 2019 season, forming a formidable midfield pairing with fellow hard-running centre Tevita Kuridrani. Simone was instrumental to the Brumbies' 2020 Super Rugby AU title and earned selection to the Wallabies squad for the 2020 Tri Nations Series.

Simone made his international debut for Australia against New Zealand in October 2020 and would earn a second cap against Argentina later that year.

Simone signed for ASM Clermont Auvergne in April 2022.
