= List of 2019 Super Rugby matches =

This article contains a list of all matches played during the 2019 Super Rugby regular season.

== Round 1 ==
15 February 2019
19:35

Chiefs	27–30	Highlanders
Try: Tyler Ardron 19'; Angus Ta'avao 22'; Etene Nanai-Seturo 38', 49'; Con: Brad Weber 23', 39'; Pen: Stephen Donald 68'	Scoreboard	Try: Pari Pari Parkinson 15'; Shannon Frizell 64'; Aaron Smith 76'; Con: Josh Ioane 16', 65', 77'; Pen: Josh Ioane 40', 44', 71'; Cards: Sio Tomkinson (red card) 67'

FMG Stadium Waikato, Hamilton
Attendance: 12,238
Referee: Glen Jackson

15 February 2019
19:45

Brumbies	27–34	Rebels
Try: Folau Fainga'a 13'; Rory Arnold 28'; Allan Alaalatoa 35'; Sam Carter 78'; Con: Christian Lealiifano 14', 36'; Pen: Christian Lealiifano 4'	Scoreboard	Try: Tom English 16'; Jack Maddocks 22', 73'; Matt Philip 32'; Anaru Rangi 49'; Con: Quade Cooper 23', 34', 50'; Pen: Quade Cooper 70'

GIO Stadium, Canberra
Attendance: 8,500
Referee: Ben O'Keeffe

16 February 2019
19:35

Blues	22–24	Crusaders
Try: Akira Ioane 42'; Ofa Tu'ungafasi 51'; Augustine Pulu 73'; Con: Otere Black 43'; Harry Plummer 52'; Pen: Otere Black 14'; Cards: Tom Robinson (yellow card) 6' to 16'	Scoreboard	Try: Manasa Mataele 18', 54' penalty try 28', 63'; Cards: Ben Funnell (yellow card) 67' to 77'

Eden Park, Auckland
Attendance: 17,200
Referee: Nick Briant

16 February 2019
19:45

Waratahs	19–20	Hurricanes
Try: Curtis Rona 43'; Con: Bernard Foley 44'; Pen: Bernard Foley 3', 12', 16', 40'	Scoreboard	Try: Ardie Savea 36'; Du'Plessis Kirifi 75'; Con: Jordie Barrett 37', 76'; Pen: Jordie Barrett 8', 53'

Brookvale Oval, Sydney
Attendance: 17,111
Referee: Angus Gardner

16 February 2019
18:55

Sunwolves	10–45	Sharks
Try: Shane Gates 9'; Con: Hayden Parker 10'; Pen: Hayden Parker 15'; Cards: James Moore (yellow card) 61' to 71'	Scoreboard	Try: Akker van der Merwe 17', 65'; Dan du Preez 35'; S'busiso Nkosi 38'; Makazole Mapimpi 47'; Jeremy Ward 72'; Con: Robert du Preez 18', 36', 39', 48', 66'; Rhyno Smith 73'; Pen: Robert du Preez 5'

National Stadium, Singapore
Attendance: 4,967
Referee: Nic Berry

16 February 2019
17:35

Bulls	40–3	Stormers
Try: Rosko Specman 4', 19'; Johnny Kôtze 24'; Jesse Kriel 45'; Con: Handré Pollard 6', 20', 25', 46'; Pen: Handré Pollard 51', 55', 71', 78'	Scoreboard	Pen: SP Marais 11'

Loftus Versfeld, Pretoria
Attendance: 25,267
Referee: Jaco Peyper

16 February 2019
18:40

Jaguares	16–25	Lions
Try: Santiago Medrano 16'; Con: Joaquín Díaz Bonilla 17'; Pen: Joaquín Díaz Bonilla 13', 26', 60'	Scoreboard	Try: Marnus Schoeman 3', 32', 50'; Con: Elton Jantjies 33', 51'; Pen: Elton Jantjies 29', 70'

José Amalfitani Stadium, Buenos Aires
Attendance: 7,634
Referee: Mike Fraser

Bye/s: Reds

== Round 2 ==
22 February 2019
19:35

Highlanders	36–31	Reds
Try: Rob Thompson 6'; Shannon Frizell 29', 42'; Ben Smith 33'; Dillon Hunt 74'; Con: Josh Ioane 7', 30', 34', 75'; Pen: Josh Ioane 16'	Scoreboard	Try: Chris Feauai-Sautia 24'; Moses Sorovi 38'; Izack Rodda 49'; Feao Fotuaika 57'; Con: Bryce Hegarty 24', 39', 58'; Hamish Stewart 49'; Pen: Bryce Hegarty 2'

Forsyth Barr Stadium, Dunedin
Attendance: 15,236
Referee: Federico Anselmi

23 February 2019
13:15

Sunwolves	30–31	Waratahs
Try: Gerhard van den Heever 8', 70'; Tom Rowe 37'; Con: Hayden Parker 9', 38', 71'; Pen: Hayden Parker 18', 34', 43'; Cards: Luke Thompson (yellow card) 62' to 72'	Scoreboard	Try: Kurtley Beale 10'; Israel Folau 24', 29'; Jack Dempsey 47' penalty try 61'; Con: Bernard Foley 11', 49'

Prince Chichibu Memorial Stadium, Tokyo
Attendance: 14,499
Referee: AJ Jacobs

23 February 2019
19:35

Crusaders	38–22	Hurricanes
Try: Scott Barrett 8', 42'; Richie Mo'unga 23', 39'; Jordan Taufua 26'; George Bridge 76'; Con: Richie Mo'unga 27', 40', 43'; Mitchell Hunt 77'; Cards: Mitchell Hunt (yellow card) 81'	Scoreboard	Try: Ben Lam 47', 80'; Wes Goosen 66'; TJ Perenara 81'; Con: Jordie Barrett 81'

AMI Stadium, Christchurch
Referee: Ben O'Keeffe

23 February 2019
19:45

Brumbies	54–17	Chiefs
Try: Tevita Kuridrani 13', 77'; Thomas Banks 16'; Chance Peni 23', 52'; Lachlan McCaffrey 36'; Folau Fainga'a 41'; Joshua Mann-Rea 70'; Con: Christian Lealiifano 15', 18', 25', 37', 53'; Wharenui Hawera 71', 78'	Scoreboard	Try: Ataata Moeakiola 29'; Samisoni Taukei'aho 57'; Con: Damian McKenzie 30', 57'; Pen: Damian McKenzie 1'

GIO Stadium, Canberra
Attendance: 8,583
Referee: Angus Gardner

23 February 2019
15:05

Sharks	26–7	Blues
Try: Aphelele Fassi 7'; Akker van der Merwe 15'; Robert du Preez 36'; Curwin Bosch 79'; Con: Robert du Preez 17', 37', 80'; Cards: Ruan Botha (yellow card) 68' to 78'	Scoreboard	Try: Tanielu Tele’a 61'; Con: Otere Black 62'

Jonsson Kings Park, Durban
Referee: Paul Williams

23 February 2019
17:15

Stormers	19–17	Lions
Try: Herschel Jantjies 85'; Con: SP Marais 87'; Pen: SP Marais 11', 28', 50', 61'; Cards: Alistair Vermaak (yellow card) 41' to 51'	Scoreboard	Try: Kwagga Smith 6'; Warren Whiteley 20'; Con: Elton Jantjies 7', 21'; Pen: Elton Jantjies 64'

DHL Newlands, Cape Town
Attendance: 14,831
Referee: Egon Seconds

23 February 2019
18:40

Jaguares	27–12	Bulls
Try: Matías Orlando 17'; Rodrigo Bruni 64'; Bautista Delguy 72'; Con: Joaquín Díaz Bonilla 18', 64', 73'; Pen: Joaquín Díaz Bonilla 48', 66'	Scoreboard	Pen: Handré Pollard 24', 45', 53', 59'

José Amalfitani Stadium, Buenos Aires
Attendance: 6,200
Referee: Brendon Pickerill

Bye/s: Rebels

== Round 3 ==
1 March 2019
19:35

Hurricanes	43–13	Brumbies
Try: Dane Coles 12', 36'; Ngani Laumape 14', 53', 60'; James Blackwell 80+2'; Con: Beauden Barrett 12', 16', 55', 61'; Jackson Garden-Bachop 80+3'; Pen: Beauden Barrett 43'	Scoreboard	Try: Folau Fainga'a 20'; Tom Wright 71'; Pen: Christian Lealiifano 29'; Cards: David Pocock (yellow card) 63' to 73'

Central Energy Trust Arena, Palmerston North
Attendance: 13,090
Referee: Nick Briant

1 March 2019
19:45

Rebels	24–19	Highlanders
Try: Tom English 9', 30'; Jack Maddocks 26'; Bill Meakes 43'; Con: Quade Cooper 11', 27'	Scoreboard	Try: Shannon Frizell 3'; Siate Tokolahi 17'; Jackson Hemopo 64'; Con: Bryn Gatland 18'; Marty Banks 65'

AAMI Park, Melbourne
Attendance: 11,029
Referee: AJ Jacobs

2 March 2019
19:35

Chiefs	15–30	Sunwolves
Try: Alex Nankivell 46'; Etene Nanai-Seturo 64'; Con: Damian McKenzie 46'; Pen: Damian McKenzie 23'	Scoreboard	Try: Shuhei Matsuhashi 2'; Uwe Helu; Gerhard van den Heever; Con: Hayden Parker 2', 32', 57'; Pen: Hayden Parker 6', 26', 35'

FMG Stadium Waikato, Hamilton
Referee: Federico Anselmi

2 March 2019
18:45

Reds	12–22	Crusaders
Try: Samu Kerevi 37'; Scott Higginbotham 75'; Con: Bryce Hegarty 39'	Scoreboard	Try: Braydon Ennor 7'; Will Jordan 9'; Whetu Douglas 49'; Jordan Taufua 57'; Con: Richie Mo'unga 50'

Suncorp Stadium, Brisbane
Attendance: 17,676
Referee: Marius van der Westhuizen

2 March 2019
15:05

Lions	12–30	Bulls
Try: Carlü Sadie 47'; Dylan Smith 65'; Con: Elton Jantjies 66'	Scoreboard	Try: Duane Vermeulen 29'; Warrick Gelant 74'; Con: Handré Pollard 76'; Pen: Handré Pollard 14', 27', 37', 43', 58', 62'

Emirates Airline Park, Johannesburg
Attendance: 25,630
Referee: Paul Williams

2 March 2019
17:15

Sharks	11–16	Stormers
Try: Lukhanyo Am 42'; Pen: Robert du Preez 15', 51'; Cards: Lukhanyo Am (yellow card) 21' to 31'; Akker van der Merwe (yellow card) 37' to 47'	Scoreboard	Try: Damian Willemse 4'; Con: SP Marais 5'; Pen: SP Marais 28', 38', 65'; Cards: Daniel du Plessis (yellow card) 47' to 57'

Jonsson Kings Park, Durban
Referee: Jaco Peyper

2 March 2019
18:40

Jaguares	23–19	Blues
Try: Ramiro Moyano 38', 64'; Julián Montoya 68'; Con: Joaquín Díaz Bonilla 65'; Pen: Joaquín Díaz Bonilla 6', 14'; Cards: Tomás Lavanini (yellow card) 32' to 42'	Scoreboard	Try: Dalton Papali'i 72'; Con: Otere Black 73'; Pen: Otere Black 2', 8', 33', 50'

José Amalfitani Stadium, Buenos Aires
Attendance: 8,722
Referee: Rasta Rasivhenge

Bye/s: Waratahs

== Round 4 ==
8 March 2019
19:35

Hurricanes	25–22	Highlanders
Try: Ngani Laumape 27', 40'; Ben Lam 71'; Con: Beauden Barrett 28', 40+2'; Pen: Beauden Barrett 64', 80+2'	Scoreboard	Try: Aaron Smith 11'; Sio Tomkinson 51'; Liam Coltman 60'; Con: Marty Banks 52', 61'; Pen: Josh Ioane 32'

Westpac Stadium, Wellington
Attendance: 13,180
Referee: Damon Murphy

8 March 2019
19:45

Rebels	29–26	Brumbies
Try: Marika Koroibete 41'; Jack Maddocks 52', 70'; Will Genia 65'; Con: Quade Cooper 54', 65', 72'; Pen: Quade Cooper 29'; Cards: Adam Coleman (yellow card) 33' to 41'; Matt Gibbon (yellow card) 40+2' to 51'	Scoreboard	Try: Henry Speight 18'; Folau Fainga'a 33'; Penalty try 40+2'; Rob Valetini 60'; Con: Christian Lealiifano 19', 62'

AAMI Park, Melbourne
Referee: AJ Jacobs

9 March 2019
17:15

Crusaders	57–28	Chiefs
Try: Braydon Ennor 6'; Sevu Reece 10'; Will Jordan 22', 35'; Andrew Makalio 28'; Michael Alaalatoa 44'; Codie Taylor 61', 69'; Bryn Hall 64'; Con: Richie Mo'unga 7', 24', 30', 37', 44'; Brett Cameron 62'	Scoreboard	Try: Taleni Seu 18'; Etene Nanai-Seturo 51'; Jack Debreczeni 72'; Mitchell Brown 74'; Con: Damian McKenzie 19', 51', 74'; Jack Debreczeni 72'

AMI Stadium, Christchurch
Referee: Brendon Pickerill

9 March 2019
19:35

Blues	28–20	Sunwolves
Try: Rieko Ioane 21', 34', 48', 58'; Con: Harry Plummer 36'; Pen: Harry Plummer 16'; Otere Black 75'	Scoreboard	Try: Rikiya Matsuda 30'; Uwe Helu 62'; Con: Rikiya Matsuda 30', 63'; Pen: Rikiya Matsuda 4', 12'; Cards: Semisi Masirewa (yellow card) 56' to 65'; Nathan Vella (yellow card) 74' to 80'

QBE Stadium, Albany
Referee: Mike Fraser

9 March 2019
19:45

Waratahs	28–17	Reds
Try: Ned Hanigan 20'; Curtis Rona 41'; Alex Newsome 70'; Con: Bernard Foley 21', 71'; Pen: Bernard Foley 7', 9', 36'	Scoreboard	Try: Samu Kerevi 27'; Chris Feauai-Sautia 38'; Sefanaia Naivalu 66'; Con: Bryce Hegarty 28'; Cards: JP Smith (yellow card) 20' to 29'

Sydney Cricket Ground, Sydney
Attendance: 15,681
Referee: Glen Jackson

9 March 2019
15:05

Lions	47–39	Jaguares
Try: Rhyno Herbst 15'; Elton Jantjies 24'; Kwagga Smith 27'; Wandisile Simelane 35'; Marnus Schoeman 45'; Courtnall Skosan 47', 50'; Con: Elton Jantjies 17', 25', 36', 46', 48', 52'	Scoreboard	Try: Ramiro Moyano 32'; Julián Montoya 38', 54'; Gaspar Baldunciel 72'; Matias Moroni 80'; Joaquin Tuculet 80+1'; Con: Joaquín Díaz Bonilla 55'; Juan Cruz Mallia 73', 80+2'; Pen: Joaquín Díaz Bonilla 19'

Emirates Airline Park, Johannesburg
Attendance: 8,124
Referee: Rasta Rasivhenge

9 March 2019
17:15

Bulls	37–14	Sharks
Try: Jesse Kriel 20'; Rosko Speckman 44', 80'; Con: Handre Pollard 21', 80+1'; Pen: Handre Pollard 4', 10', 29', 36', 52'; Drop: Handre Pollard 78'	Scoreboard	Try: Jeremy Ward 42'; Dan du Preez 55'; Con: Robert du Preez 42', 56'

Loftus Versfeld, Pretoria
Referee: Marius van der Westhuizen

Bye/s: Stormers

== Round 5 ==
15 March 2019
19:35

Chiefs	23–23	Hurricanes
Try: Anton Lienert-Brown 2'; Damian McKenzie 20'; Con: Damian McKenzie 3', 22'; Pen: Damian McKenzie 34', 40+2', 58'	Scoreboard	Try: Matt Proctor 15'; Wes Goosen 51'; Con: Beauden Barrett 16', 53'; Pen: Beauden Barrett 8', 43'; Jordie Barrett 27'

FMG Stadium Waikato, Hamilton
Attendance: 12,902

15 March 2019
19:45

Brumbies	19–13	Waratahs
Try: Folau Fainga'a 14', 23'; Penalty Try 54'; Con: Christian Lealiifano 15'	Scoreboard	Try: Michael Hooper 4'; Alex Newsome 49'; Pen: Bernard Foley 64'; Cards: Sekope Kepu (yellow card) 35' to 44'; Harry Johnson-Holmes (yellow card) 54' to 63'

GIO Stadium, Canberra
Attendance: 12,122

15 March 2019
19:10

Stormers	35–8	Jaguares
Try: Daniel du Plessis Plessis 18'; Siya Kolisi 47'; Herschel Jantjies 60'; Justin Phillips 78'; Con: SP Marais 20', 49'; Jean-Luc du Plessis 61'; Pen: SP Marais 13', 35', 40+3'	Scoreboard	Try: Bautista Delguy 5'; Pen: Joaquín Díaz Bonilla Bonilla 26'

DHL Newlands, Cape Town
Attendance: 10,411

16 March 2019
13:15

Sunwolves	31–34	Reds
Try: Jamie Booth 12'; Rahboni Warren-Vosayaco 23'; Dan Pryor 37'; Keisuke Uchida 69'; Con: Hayden Parker 14', 25', 38', 70'; Pen: Hayden Parker 73'	Scoreboard	Try: Liam Wright 18'; Brandon Paenga-Amosa 59', 66'; Harry Hoopert 62'; Tate McDermott 75'; Con: Hamish Stewart 60', 62', 67'; Pen: Hamish Stewart 80'

Prince Chichibu Memorial Stadium, Tokyo

16 March 2019
19:35

Highlanders	0–0*	Crusaders
	Scoreboard

Forsyth Barr Stadium, Dunedin

16 March 2019
15:05

Lions	36–33	Rebels
Try: Malcolm Marx 5'; Marnus Schoeman 50'; Andries Coetzee 53'; Lionel Mapoe 56'; Courtnall Skosan 64'; Con: Elton Jantjies 51', 55', 57', 65'; Pen: Gianni Lombard 80+2'	Scoreboard	Try: Reece Hodge 8'; Quade Cooper 12'; Bill Meakes 20'; Isi Naisarani 23'; Tom English 42'; Con: Quade Cooper 14', 21', 24', 43'; Cards: Bill Meakes (yellow card) 20' to 29'; Angus Cottrell (yellow card) 77' to 80'

Emirates Airline Park, Johannesburg
Attendance: 10,309

Bye/s: Bulls, Sharks, Blues

Note*: The match was cancelled and called a draw due to 2019 Christchurch Mosque Shootings

== Round 6 ==
22 March 2019
19:35

Blues	33–26	Highlanders
Try: Rieko Ioane 10', 33'; Melani Nanai 57'; Patrick Tuipulotu 74'; Con: Harry Plummer 34'; Otere Black 75'; Pen: Harry Plummer 24', 52'; Otere Black 78'	Scoreboard	Try: Luke Whitelock 18'; Tevita Li 54'; Con: Marty Banks 19', 56'; Pen: Marty Banks 3', 37', 49', 64'; Cards: Waisake Naholo (yellow card) 68' to 77'

Eden Park, Auckland
Attendance: 12,400

23 March 2019
19:35

Hurricanes	34–28	Stormers
Try: Ben May 12'; Jordie Barrett 24'; Wes Goosen 52', 62'; Beauden Barrett 70'; Con: Beauden Barrett 13', 54', 71'; Pen: Beauden Barrett 20'; Cards: Vaea Fifita (yellow card) 40+1' to 50'	Scoreboard	Try: Siya Kolisi 30'; Jaco Coetzee 58'; Bongi Mbonambi 40+3'; Con: SP Marais 31', 59'; Pen: SP Marais 4', 9', 38'; Cards: Jean-Luc du Plessis (yellow card) 23' to 32'

Westpac Stadium, Wellington
Attendance: 11,741

23 March 2019
19:45

Waratahs	20–12	Crusaders
Try: Jed Holloway 4'; Cameron Clark 11'; Israel Folau 74'; Con: Bernard Foley 5'; Pen: Bernard Foley 39'	Scoreboard	Try: George Bridge 29'; Will Jordan 80+1'; Con: Brett Cameron 29'

Sydney Cricket Ground, Sydney
Attendance: 12,775

23 March 2019
18:55

Sunwolves	24–37	Lions
Try: Penalty Try 7'; Rahboni Warren-Vosayaco 65', 79'; Con: Penalty Try 7'; Hayden Parker 66', 79'; Pen: Hayden Parker 43'	Scoreboard	Try: Malcolm Marx 13', 36'; Nic Groom 52'; Elton Jantjies 57'; Lionel Mapoe 61'; Hacjivah Dayimani 75'; Con: Elton Jantjies 15', 62'; Pen: Elton Jantjies 69'; Cards: Sylvian Mahuza (yellow card) 6' to 15'

National Stadium, Singapore
Attendance: 4,389

23 March 2019
15:05

Bulls	20–56	Chiefs
Try: Jesse Kriel 63'; Burger Odendaal 78'; Con: Handre Pollard 64', 78'; Pen: Handre Pollard 15', 34'	Scoreboard	Try: Solomon Alaimalo 25', 80'; Alex Nankivell 31', 61'; Brodie Retallick 40+1', 42'; Te Toiroa Tahuriorangi Tahuriorangi 74'; Con: Damian McKenzie 26', 32', 40+1', 44', 62', 75'; Pen: Damian McKenzie 11', 70', 77'; Cards: Solomon Alaimalo (yellow card) 62' to 71'

Loftus Versfeld, Pretoria
Attendance: 12,985

23 March 2019
17:15

Sharks	28–14	Rebels
Try: Dan du Preez 7'; Robert du Preez 52'; Makazole Mapimpi 58'; Con: Robert du Preez 7', 53'; Pen: Robert du Preez 17', 27', 36'; Cards: Marius Louw (yellow card) 75' to 80'	Scoreboard	Try: Tom English 21'; Jack Maddocks 31'; Con: Quade Cooper 22', 33'

Jonsson Kings Park, Durban

24 March 2019
15:05

Reds	36–14	Brumbies
Try: Scott Higginbotham 14'; Chris Feauai-Sautia 48'; Tate McDermott 50'; Bryce Hegarty 30'; Brandon Paenga-Amosa 80+1'; Con: Bryce Hegarty 15', 49', 52', 76'; Pen: Bryce Hegarty 30'	Scoreboard	Try: Henry Speight 41'; Jahrome Brown 71'; Con: Christian Lealiifano 43', 71'

Suncorp Stadium, Brisbane
Attendance: 13,566

Bye/s: Jaguares

== Round 7 ==
29 March 2019
19:35

Hurricanes	8–32	Crusaders
Try: Ngani Laumape 32'; Pen: Jordie Barrett 7'		Try: Will Jordan 16'; David Havili 24', 44'; Braydon Ennor 51'; Con: Richie Mo'unga 18', 25', 46'; Pen: Richie Mo'unga 36', 72'; Cards: Matt Todd (yellow card) 31' to 40'

Westpac Stadium, Wellington
Attendance: 18,935

29 March 2019
19:45

Waratahs	29–31	Sunwolves
Try: Nick Phipps 2'; Cameron Clark 15'; Michael Hooper 43'; Kurtley Beale 65'; Con: Mack Mason 3', 44'; Kurtley Beale 66'; Pen: Mack Mason 35'		Try: Grant Hattingh 20'; Semisi Masirewa 30', 49', 53'; Con: Hayden Parker 21', 31', 51', 53'; Pen: Hayden Parker 11'

McDonald Jones Stadium, Newcastle
Attendance: 12,621

30 March 2019
19:35

Blues	24–9	Stormers
Try: Tanielu Tele’a 31'; Otere Black 62'; Rieko Ioane 75'; Con: Otere Black 32', 63', 76'; Pen: Otere Black 32'		Pen: Jean-Luc du Plessis 20', 29', 47'

Eden Park, Auckland
Attendance: 11,400

30 March 2019
18:45

Reds	13–32	Rebels
Try: Taniela Tupou 75'; Con: Bryce Hegarty 76'; Pen: Bryce Hegarty 4', 34'		Try: Jack Maddocks 39', 47'; Anaru Rangi 44'; Robert Leota 79'; Con: Quade Cooper 45', 48', 80+1'; Pen: Quade Cooper 3', 20'

Suncorp Stadium, Brisbane
Attendance: 10,745

30 March 2019
15:05

Sharks	16–19	Bulls
Try: Dan du Preez 41'; Andre Esterhuizen 71'; Pen: Robert du Preez 5', 62'; Cards: Akker van der Merwe (red card) 57'		Try: Jesse Kriel 52'; Con: Handre Pollard 53'; Pen: Handre Pollard 3', 28', 68', 79'; Cards: Schalk Brits (red card) 57'

Jonsson Kings Park, Durban

30 March 2019
18:40

Jaguares	27–30	Chiefs
Try: Joaquin Tuculet 46'; Pablo Matera 56'; Matias Orlando 73'; Con: Joaquín Díaz Bonilla Bonilla 48', 58'; Santiago Gonzalez Iglesias Iglesias 74'; Pen: Joaquín Díaz Bonilla Bonilla 6', 12'; Cards: Marcos Kremer (yellow card) 37' to 46'		Try: Damian McKenzie 25'; Tumua Manu 34'; Te Toiroa Tahuriorangi Tahuriorangi 78'; Con: Damian McKenzie 26', 35', 80'; Pen: Damian McKenzie 9', 43', 70'

José Amalfitani Stadium, Buenos Aires

Bye/s: Lions, Brumbies, Highlanders

== Round 8 ==
5 April 2019
19:35

Highlanders	28–31	Hurricanes
Try: Shannon Frizell 19'; Ash Dixon 28'; Kayne Hammington 54'; James Lentjes 58'; Con: Marty Banks 20', 30', 55', 59'		Try: TJ Perenara 22'; Ardie Savea 39', 61'; Ngani Laumape 66'; Con: Beauden Barrett 23', 40', 63', 67'; Pen: Beauden Barrett 44'; Cards: Liam Mitchell (yellow card) 80+3' to 80+3'

Forsyth Barr Stadium, Dunedin
Attendance: 15,628

5 April 2019
19:00

Reds	24–12	Stormers
Try: Samu Kerevi 42'; Brandon Paenga-Amosa 46'; Tate McDermott 67'; Con: Bryce Hegarty 43', 47', 68'; Pen: Bryce Hegarty 79'		Try: Kobus van Dyk 51'; Damian de Allende 75'; Con: Jean-Luc du Plessis 52'; Cards: Siya Kolisi (yellow card) 40' to 49'

Suncorp Stadium, Brisbane
Attendance: 9,559

5 April 2019
19:10

Lions	5–42	Sharks
Try: Sylvian Mahuza 79'; Cards: Rhyno Herbst (yellow card) 11' to 20'		Try: Jacques Vermeulen 19'; Makazole Mapimpi 22', 38'; Lukhanyo Am 27'; Thomas du Toit 72'; Aphelele Fassi 80+2'; Con: Robert du Preez 28'; Curwin Bosch 73', 80+3'; Pen: Robert du Preez 31'; Curwin Bosch 48'

Emirates Airline Park, Johannesburg

6 April 2019
17:15

Crusaders	36–14	Brumbies
Try: Sevu Reece 44', 73'; Will Jordan 54', 57'; Jordan Taufua 71'; Con: Richie Mo'unga 45', 58', 72'; Brett Cameron 74'; Pen: Brett Cameron 80+1'; Cards: Owen Franks (yellow card) 28' to 37'		Try: Christian Lealiifano 33'; Tevita Kuridrani 77'; Con: Christian Lealiifano 34', 78'; Cards: Toni Pulu (yellow card) 54' to 63'; Sam Carter (yellow card) 66' to 75'

AMI Stadium, Christchurch

6 April 2019
19:35

Blues	32–29	Waratahs
Try: Tom Robinson 9'; Caleb Clarke 17'; TJ Faiane 47'; Ma'a Nonu 60'; Con: Otere Black 10', 18', 61'; Pen: Otere Black 4', 67'		Try: Israel Folau 24'; Will Miller 38'; Alex Newsome 55'; Jake Gordon 76'; Con: Bernard Foley 26', 40', 57'; Pen: Bernard Foley 64'

Eden Park, Auckland
Attendance: 10,455

6 April 2019
19:45

Rebels	42–15	Sunwolves
Try: Hodge (3) 7' c, 16' c, 61' c Meakes 25' c Cooper 40' c Genia 68' c Con: Cooper (6/6) 7', 17', 26', 40', 63', 69'; Cards: Tupou (yellow card) 74' to 80'; Magnay (yellow card) 80' to 80'	Report	Try: Masirewa (2) 31' m, 42' c Con: Parker (1/2) 44'; Pen: Parker (1/1) 14'; Cards: Vella (yellow card) 76' to 80'

AAMI Park, Melbourne

6 April 2019
15:05

Bulls	20–22	Jaguares
Try: Stighling 43' m Pen: Libbok (5/5) 7', 16', 23', 53', 61'; Cards: Agaba (yellow card) 76' to 80' van Vuuren (yellow card) 71' to 80'	Report	Try: Matera 27' c Miotti (2) 73' c, 76' m Con: Iglesias (1/1) 28'; Miotti (1/2) 74'; Pen: Iglesias (1/1) 51'; Cards: Chaparro (yellow card) 46' to 56'

Loftus Versfeld, Pretoria
Attendance: 7,982

Bye/s: Chiefs

== Round 9 ==
12 April 2019
19:35

Crusaders	43–17	Highlanders
Try: Ennor 26' c Havili 42' c Penalty Try 52'; Reece 57' m Drummond 69' c Jordan 76' c Con: Mo'unga (3/4) 26', 43', 70'; Hunt (1/1) 77'; Pen: Mo'unga (1/1) 48'; Cards: Funnell (yellow card) 79' to 80+2'		Try: Smith 3' c Ioane 74' c Con: Ioane (1/1) 4'; Gatland (1/1) 74'; Pen: Ioane (1/1) 12'

AMI Stadium, Christchurch

12 April 2019
19:45

Rebels	24–41	Stormers
Try: Hodge 41' c Genia 68' c Magnay 77' c Con: Cooper (3/3) 42', 68', 77'; Pen: Cooper (1/1) 23'	Report	Try: Leyds 3' c Augustus 47' c de Allende 52' c Nel (2) 56' c, 79' c Con: du Plessis (2/2) 5', 49'; Stander (3/3) 53', 57', 80'; Pen: du Plessis (1/1) 25'; Stander (1/1) 61'

AAMI Park, Melbourne

13 April 2019
19:35

Chiefs	33–29	Blues
Try: Weber 10' c Boshier (2) 25' c, 64' c Moeakiola 44' c Parete 72' m Con: D McKenzie (2/2) 11', 26'; M McKenzie (2/3) 46', 64'	Report	Try: Nanai 40' c Nonu (2) 58' m, 78' c Ioane 66' c Con: Black (2/3) 40', 65'; Plummer (1/1) 79'; Pen: Black (1/1) 4'

FMG Stadium Waikato, Hamilton
Attendance: 14,977

13 April 2019
19:45

Brumbies	31–20	Lions
Try: McCaffrey 20' c Pulu 26' c Kuridrani 38' m Banks 54' m Wright 57' c Con: Leali'ifano (3/5) 21', 27', 59'; Cards: Wright (yellow card) 4' to 14'	Report	Try: Dyantyi 6' c Jantjies 49' c Mahuza 69' m Con: Jantjies (1/3) 49'; Pen: Jantjies (1/1) 24'

GIO Stadium, Canberra
Attendance: 7,541

13 April 2019
15:05

Sharks	17–51	Jaguares

Jonsson Kings Park, Durban

13 April 2019
17:15

Bulls	32–17	Reds

Loftus Versfeld, Pretoria
Attendance: 7,701

Bye/s: Sunwolves, Waratahs, Hurricanes

== Round 10 ==
19 April 2019
19:35

Chiefs	17–23	Lions

FMG Stadium Waikato, Hamilton

19 April 2019
19:00

Sunwolves	23–29	Hurricanes

Prince Chichibu Memorial Stadium, Tokyo

19 April 2019
15:05

Sharks	14–21	Reds

Jonsson Kings Park, Durban

20 April 2019
19:35

Highlanders	24–12	Blues

Forsyth Barr Stadium, Dunedin
Attendance: 14,186

20 April 2019
19:45

Waratahs	23–20	Rebels

Sydney Cricket Ground, Sydney
Attendance: 10,114

20 April 2019
15:05

Stormers	17–19	Brumbies

DHL Newlands, Cape Town

Bye/s: Bulls, Jaguares, Crusaders

== Round 11 ==
26 April 2019
19:35

Crusaders	36–10	Lions

AMI Stadium, Christchurch

26 April 2019
19:00

Sunwolves	0–52	Highlanders

Prince Chichibu Memorial Stadium, Tokyo

27 April 2019
19:35

Hurricanes	47–19	Chiefs

Westpac Stadium, Wellington
Attendance: 12,991

27 April 2019
19:45

Waratahs	15–23	Sharks

Western Sydney Stadium, Sydney
Attendance: 10,605

27 April 2019
15:05

Stormers	24–23	Bulls

DHL Newlands, Cape Town

27 April 2019
18:40

Jaguares	20–15	Brumbies

José Amalfitani Stadium, Buenos Aires

Bye/s: Rebels, Reds, Blues

== Round 12 ==
3 May 2019
19:35

Crusaders	21–21	Sharks

AMI Stadium, Christchurch

3 May 2019
19:45

Reds	32–26	Sunwolves

Suncorp Stadium, Brisbane
Attendance: 8,600

4 May 2019
17:15

Hurricanes	29–19	Rebels

Westpac Stadium, Wellington
Attendance: 13,469

4 May 2019
19:35

Highlanders	31–31	Chiefs

Forsyth Barr Stadium, Dunedin
Attendance: 14,802

4 May 2019
19:45

Brumbies	26–21	Blues

GIO Stadium, Canberra
Attendance: 7,567

4 May 2019
15:05

Bulls	28–21	Waratahs

Loftus Versfeld, Pretoria
Attendance: 7,483

4 May 2019
16:40

Jaguares	30–25	Stormers

José Amalfitani Stadium, Buenos Aires

Bye/s: Lions

== Round 13 ==
10 May 2019
19:35

Blues	12–22	Hurricanes

Eden Park, Auckland
Attendance: 16,900

10 May 2019
19:45

Rebels	30–24	Reds

AAMI Park, Melbourne

10 May 2019
19:10

Bulls	13–45	Crusaders

Loftus Versfeld, Pretoria
Attendance: 23,366

11 May 2019
17:15

Highlanders	32–27	Jaguares

Forsyth Barr Stadium, Dunedin
Attendance: 11,109

11 May 2019
19:35

Chiefs	29–23	Sharks

FMG Stadium Waikato, Hamilton
Attendance: 9,558

11 May 2019
15:05

Lions	29–28	Waratahs

Emirates Airline Park, Johannesburg
Attendance: 9,630
Referee: Egon Seconds

12 May 2019
16:05

Brumbies	33–0	Sunwolves

GIO Stadium, Canberra
Attendance: 7,698

Bye/s: Stormers

== Round 14 ==
17 May 2019
19:35

Hurricanes	20–28	Jaguares

Westpac Stadium, Wellington
Attendance: 14,891

17 May 2019
19:45

Rebels	17–32	Bulls

AAMI Park, Melbourne

18 May 2019
19:35

Blues	23–8	Chiefs

Eden Park, Auckland
Attendance: 15,100

18 May 2019
19:45

Reds	32–40	Waratahs

Suncorp Stadium, Brisbane
Attendance: 12,236

18 May 2019
15:05

Lions	38–29	Highlanders

Emirates Airline Park, Johannesburg

18 May 2019
17:15

Stormers	19–19	Crusaders

DHL Newlands, Cape Town
Attendance: 27,653

Bye/s: Sharks, Sunwolves, Brumbies

== Round 15 ==
24 May 2019
19:35

Chiefs	19–13	Reds

FMG Stadium Waikato, Hamilton
Attendance: 11,133
Referee: Angus Gardner

24 May 2019
19:45

Brumbies	22–10	Bulls

GIO Stadium, Canberra
Attendance: 6,311
Referee: Jaco Peyper

25 May 2019
14:15

Sunwolves	7–52	Rebels

Prince Chichibu Memorial Stadium, Tokyo

25 May 2019
19:35

Crusaders	19–11	Blues

AMI Stadium, Christchurch

25 May 2019
19:45

Waratahs	15–23	Jaguares

Western Sydney Stadium, Sydney
Attendance: 13,885

25 May 2019
15:05

Stormers	34–22	Highlanders

DHL Newlands, Cape Town
Attendance: 13,028

25 May 2019
17:15

Sharks	27–17	Lions

Jonsson Kings Park, Durban

Bye/s: Hurricanes

== Round 16 ==
31 May 2019
19:35

Blues	22–22	Bulls

Eden Park, Auckland
Attendance: 7,400

31 May 2019
19:45

Rebels	15–20	Waratahs

AAMI Park, Melbourne
Attendance: 8,061

1 June 2019
14:15

Sunwolves	19–42	Brumbies

Prince Chichibu Memorial Stadium, Tokyo
Attendance: 16,741

1 June 2019
19:35

Chiefs	40–27	Crusaders

ANZ Stadium, Suva, Fiji

1 June 2019
19:45

Reds	23–34	Jaguares

Suncorp Stadium, Brisbane
Attendance: 8,756

1 June 2019
15:05

Sharks	17–30	Hurricanes

Jonsson Kings Park, Durban

1 June 2019
17:15

Lions	41–22	Stormers

Emirates Airline Park
Attendance: 15,831

Bye/s: Highlanders

== Round 17 ==
7 June 2019
19:35

Highlanders	24–24	Bulls
Try: Josh McKay 12', 34'; Waisake Naholo 22', 54'; Con: Josh Ioane 14', 36' (2/4)	Report	Try: Divan Rossouw 28'; Jason Jenkins 37'; Jaco Visagie 75'; Con: Handre Pollard 29', 38', 76' (3/3); Pen: Handre Pollard 58' (1/1)

Forsyth Barr Stadium, Dunedin
Attendance: 15,123
Referee: Angus Gardner

7 June 2019
19:45

Reds	29–28	Blues
Try: Scott Higginbotham 21', 77'; Taniela Tupou 33'; Bryce Hegarty 43'; Con: Bryce Hegarty 34', 44', 78' (3/3); Pen: Bryce Hegarty 40' (1/2)	Report	Try: Blake Gibson 3'; Tanielu Teleʻa 18'; Augustine Pulu 23', 47'; Con: Otere Black 5', 19', 24', 48' (4/4)

Suncorp Stadium, Brisbane
Attendance: 9,677
Referee: Brendon Pickerill

8 June 2019
19:35

Crusaders	66–0	Rebels
Try: Sevu Reece 9', 52', 75'; David Havili 16', 61'; Braydon Ennor 30', 41', 57'; Bryn Hall 49'; Ryan Crotty 80+1'; Con: Richie Mo'unga 10', 17', 40+1', 50', 53', 58', 61' (7/9); Ryan Crotty 80+1' (1/1)	Report

AMI Stadium, Christchurch
Referee: Glen Jackson

8 June 2019
19:45

Waratahs	24–35	Brumbies
Try: Nick Phipps 48'; Adam Ashley-Cooper 71'; Curtis Rona 80+1'; Con: Bernard Foley 49', 71', 80+2' (3/3); Pen: Bernard Foley 11' (1/1)	Report	Try: Rory Arnold 15'; Andy Muirhead 19'; Irae Simone 23'; Folau Fainga'a 33'; Tom Cusack 75'; Con: Christian Lealiifano 16', 21', 24', 34', 76' (5/5)

Bankwest Stadium, Parramatta
Attendance: 12,016
Referee: Ben O’Keeffe

8 June 2019
15:05

Lions	17–37	Hurricanes
Try: Aphiwe Dyantyi 10', 59'; Con: Shaun Reynolds 11', 60' (2/2); Pen: Shaun Reynolds 21' (1/1)	Report	Try: Ngani Laumape 7'; Ben Lam 41', 48'; Dane Coles 65', 76'; Con: Jordie Barrett 8', 42', 66' (3/5); Pen: Jordie Barrett 40', 47' (2/2)

Emirates Airline Park, Johannesburg
Referee: Jaco Peyper

8 June 2019
17:15

Stormers	31–18	Sunwolves
Try: Bongi Mbonambi 16'; Craig Barry 29'; Jaco Coetzee 53', 73'; Con: Jean-Luc du Plessis 17', 31', 55' (3/3); Joshua Stander 74' (1/1); Pen: Joshua Stander 65' (1/1)	Report	Try: Semisi Masirewa 62', 76'; Con: Hayden Parker 63' (1/2); Pen: Hayden Parker 11', 36' (2/2)

DHL Newlands, Cape Town
Attendance: 8,337
Referee: AJ Jacobs

8 June 2019
16:40

Jaguares	34–7	Sharks
Try: Sebastian Cancelliere 3', 59'; Emiliano Boffelli 15', 53'; Santiago Carreras 80'; Con: Joaquín Díaz Bonilla 16', 54', 60' (3/5); Pen: Joaquín Díaz Bonilla 45' (1/4)		Try: Andre Esterhuizen 68'; Con: Curwin Bosch 69' (1/1)

José Amalfitani Stadium, Buenos Aires
Attendance: 15,128
Referee: Nick Briant

Bye/s: Chiefs

== Round 18 ==
14 June 2019
19:35

Highlanders	49–12	Waratahs
Try: Josh McKay 8'; Tevita Li 10'; Tom Franklin 19'; Waisake Naholo 24'; Penalty Try 35'; Teihorangi Walden 39'; Rob Thompson 80'; Con: Josh Ioane 9', 12', 20', 25', 41' (5/5); Elliot Dixon 80+1' (1/1)	Report	Try: Alex Newsome 28'; Mack Mason 72'; Con: Mack Mason 29' (1/2); Cards: Tom Robertson (yellow card) 35' to 45'

Rugby Park, Invercargill
Attendance: 7,340
Referee: Mike Fraser

14 June 2019
19:45

Rebels	8–59	Chiefs
Try: Matt Philip 67'; Pen: Reece Hodge 19' (1/1)	Report	Try: Sam Cane 13'; Shaun Stevenson 22', 51', 76'; Lachlan Boshier 40+1'; Sean Wainui 43'; Anton Lienert-Brown 48'; Jack Debreczeni 57'; Marty McKenzie 73'; Con: Jack Debreczeni 14', 22', 40+1', 49', 52', 57' (6/8); Marty McKenzie 73' (1/1)

AAMI Park, Melbourne
Referee: Angus Gardner

14 June 2019
19:10

Jaguares	52–10	Sunwolves
Try: Santiago Carreras 11'; Sebastian Cancelliere 33', 74'; Julian Montoya 41'; Penalty Try 41'; Juan Cruz Mallia 56'; Matias Moroni 61'; Javier Ortega Desio 64'; Con: Domingo Miotti 12', 34', 56', 63', 75' (5/7)	Report	Try: Gerhard van den Heever 28'; Semisi Masirewa 37'

José Amalfitani Stadium, Buenos Aires
Attendance: 8,325
Referee: Federico Anselmi

15 June 2019
19:35

Hurricanes	29–24	Blues
Try: Peter Umaga-Jensen 38', 64'; Fletcher Smith 45'; Isaia Walker-Leawere 51'; Con: Jackson Garden-Bachop 46', 53', 65' (3/4); Pen: Jackson Garden-Bachop 76' (1/1)	Report	Try: Tanielu Teleʻa 13'; Caleb Clarke 36'; Melani Nanai 40+2'; Con: Otere Black 14', 37', 40+3' (3/3); Pen: Otere Black 8' (1/1)

Westpac Stadium, Wellington
Attendance: 13,624
Referee: Glen Jackson

15 June 2019
19:45

Brumbies	40–27	Reds
Try: Andy Muirhead 19'; Lachlan McCaffrey 37'; Penalty Try 40+1'; Rory Arnold 47'; Tom Wright 50'; Murray Douglas 72'; Con: Christian Lealiifano 38', 49', 52' (3/4); Ryan Lonergan 73' (1/1)	Report	Try: Bryce Hegarty 7'; Duncan Paia'aua 63'; Liam Wright 78'; Con: Bryce Hegarty 9', 64', 79' (3/3); Pen: Bryce Hegarty 31' (1/1); Drop: Matt McGahan 53' (1/1)

GIO Stadium, Canberra
Attendance: 9,751
Referee: Paul Williams

15 June 2019
15:05

Stormers	9–12	Sharks
Pen: Joshua Stander 23', 45' (2/2); Jean-Luc du Plessis 77' (1/1)	Report	Try: Rhyno Smith 28'; Lukhanyo Am 80+1'; Con: Robert du Preez 80+2' (1/2)

DHL Newlands, Cape Town
Referee: AJ Jacobs

15 June 2019
17:15

Bulls	48–27	Lions
Try: Hanro Liebenberg 4', 11'; Lizo Gqoboka 16'; Burger Odendaal 20'; Cornal Hendricks 60'; Handre Pollard 65'; Manie Libbok 71'; Con: Handre Pollard 5', 12', 17', 20', 66' (5/7); Pen: Handre Pollard 25' (1/1)	Report	Try: Hacjivah Dayimani 1'; Cyle Brink 56'; Con: Elton Jantjies 2' (1/2); Pen: Elton Jantjies 10', 30', 37', 43' (4/4); Drop: Andries Coetzee 14' (1/1)

Loftus Versfeld, Pretoria
Attendance: 18,046
Referee: Marius van der Westhuizen

Bye/s: Crusaders

== See also ==
- 2019 Super Rugby season
