= John Folau =

Tonga international rugby league & union footballer

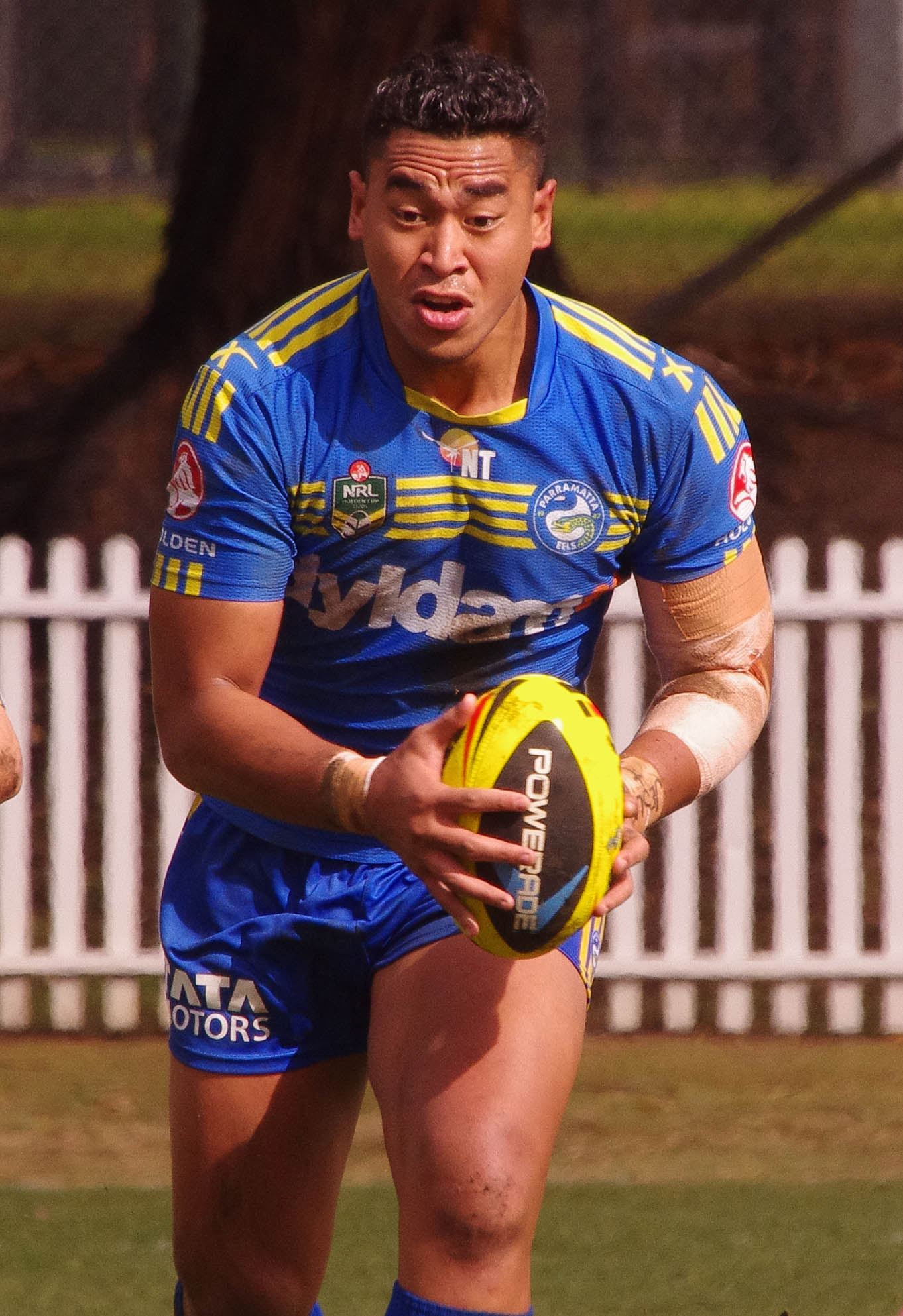

Personal information
- Full name: Sione Folau
- Born: 23 September 1994 (age 32) Brisbane, Queensland, Australia
- Height: 193 cm (6 ft 4 in)
- Weight: 112 kg (17 st 9 lb)

Playing information
- Position: Centre, Wing
Club
Years	Team	Pld	T	G	FG	P
2015–17	Parramatta Eels	8	4	0	0	16
Representative
Years	Team	Pld	T	G	FG	P
2014	Tonga	1				0

Rugby union career
Senior career
Years	Team	Apps	(Points)
2018–	Sydney Rays	2	(5)
Super Rugby
Years	Team	Apps	(Points)
2019	Waratahs	0	(0)
- Education: Patrician Brothers' College, Blacktown
- Relatives: Israel Folau (brother)

John Folau (born 23 September 1994) is a rugby league and rugby union footballer who plays for the Sydney Rays in the National Rugby Championship competition. He is a former Tonga international rugby league footballer.

== Background ==
Folau was born in Brisbane, Queensland, Australia. He is of Tongan descent and played his junior football for the Goodna Eagles, Souths Acacia Ridge and Minto Cobras, before being signed by the Parramatta Eels. Folau attended Marsden State High School and Patrician Brothers' College, Blacktown, where he represented the New South Wales Combined Catholic Colleges rugby league team.

Folau is the younger brother of former Melbourne Storm and Brisbane Broncos player, and former NSW Waratahs and Wallabies player Israel Folau.

== Rugby league ==
=== Early career ===
From 2012 to 2014, Folau played for the Parramatta Eels' NYC team. In April 2013, he was 18th man for the Queensland Under-20s team. In May 2014, he played for the Queensland Under-20s team.

=== 2014 ===
In October 2014, Folau played for Tonga against Papua New Guinea.

=== 2015 ===
In 2015, Folau moved on to the Eels' New South Wales Cup team, Wentworthville Magpies. In Round 3 of the 2015 NRL season, he made his NRL debut for the Eels against the New Zealand Warriors. On 4 April 2015, he re-signed with the Eels on a 2-year contract. In May 2015, Folau was named 18th man for Tonga against Samoa in the 2015 Polynesian Cup.

=== 2018 ===
After being unable to break into the Parramatta first grade side, Folau signed a contract to join the Blacktown Workers Sea Eagles for the 2018 Intrust Super Premiership NSW season.

== Rugby union ==
=== New South Wales Waratahs ===
On 4 September, Folau announced that he was quitting rugby league and switching to rugby union signing with the Sydney Rays. Following Folau's move to the NRC, the New South Wales Waratahs signed Folau shortly before the start of the 2019 season, joining his brother, Israel Folau. He was released in June 2019 without ever playing a match for the team.
