= Geoffrey Townsend =

Geoffrey Townsend may refer to:

- Geoff Townsend (born 1964), Australian professional rugby union football coach
- Geoff Townsend (Canadian football), Canadian football player
- Geoffrey Paulson Townsend (1911–2002), English architect and property developer
