= Sydney (NRC team) =

Australian rugby union team

- Sydney logo adopted 2019
- Union: NSW Rugby
- Founded: 2007 (as Central Coast Rays) re-formed as North Harbour; 2014, Sydney 2016.
- Disbanded: 2020 (competition disbanded)
- Location: Sydney, Australia
- Ground: (Capacity: 5,000) Woollahra Oval
- Coach: Chris Whitaker
- Captain: Lalakai Foketi
- League: National Rugby Championship
- 2019: 8th
Team kit

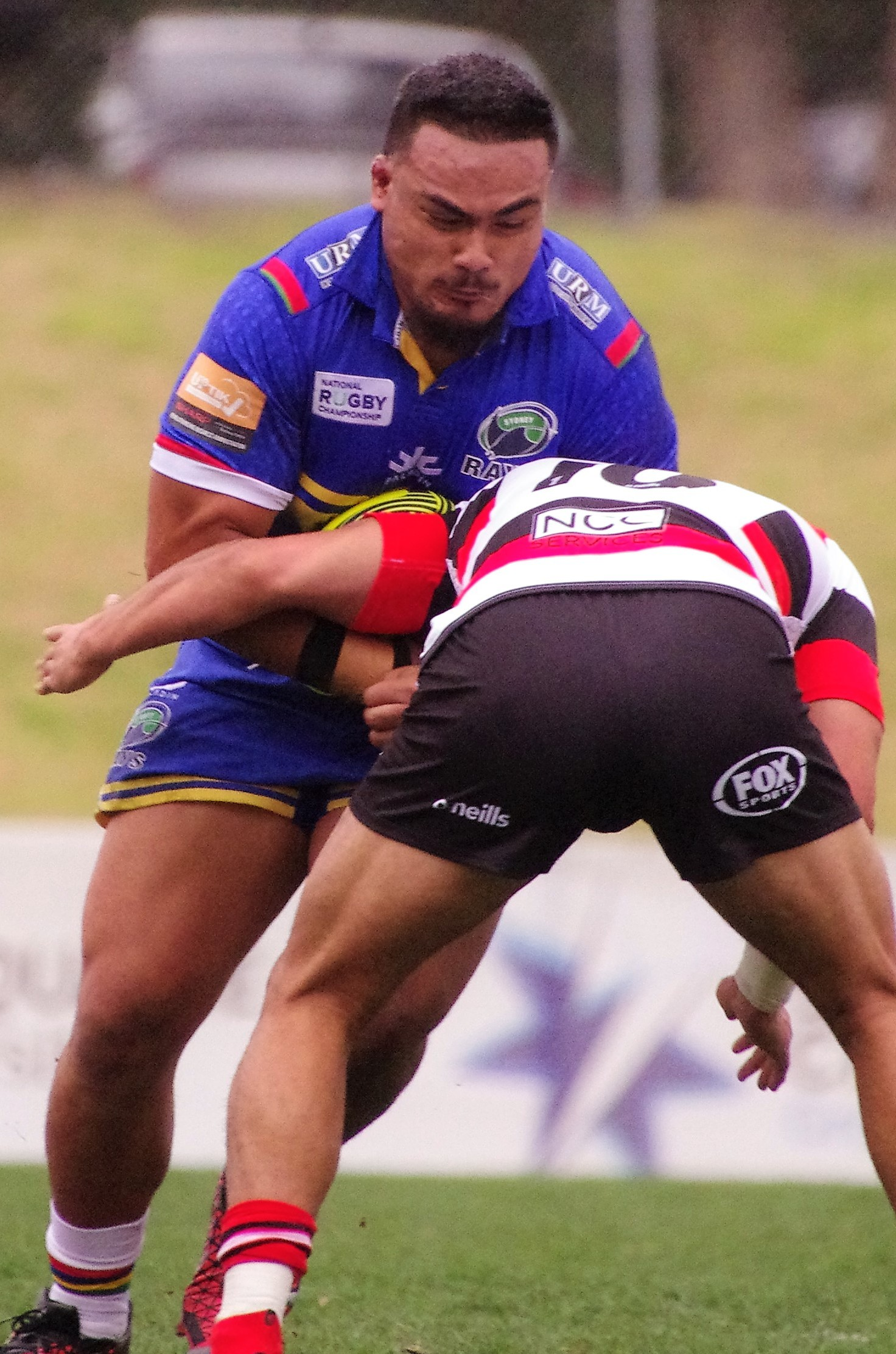
Shambeckler Vui, 2018

Sydney, formerly the Sydney Rays and North Harbour Rays, was an Australian rugby union team that competed in the National Rugby Championship (NRC). It was one of two sides from New South Wales that played in the final season of NRC in 2019; the other was the NSW Country Eagles.

The team played as the all-of-Sydney side in 2019 and wore the traditional blue and yellow colours of Sydney's representative rugby teams, drawing on the metropolitan sides that represented the city for more than a century. It adopted as its logo the anchor insignia of the Sydney Rugby Union, which dates back to at least 1970.

Known as North Harbour Rays for the first two NRC seasons, Sydney Rays became the team name for the next three seasons as the number of NRC teams in the city reduced from three in 2014 to eventually just one by 2018. The team's name became Sydney in 2019 after New South Wales Rugby took control of the side and dropped the Rays moniker.

North Harbour Rays had been formed as a consortium of four Northern Sydney clubs; Gordon, Manly, Northern Suburbs, and Warringah in 2014. North Harbour took its identity from the Central Coast Rays side that played in the earlier national competition, the Australian Rugby Championship (ARC) in 2007. The original team had been backed by the same four Sydney clubs, along with the Central Coast Waves.

== History ==
In 2007, an attempt was made to form a third tier of rugby in Australia, similar to New Zealand's ITM Cup and South Africa's Currie Cup. The newly formed competition included eight teams and was called the Australian Rugby Championship. Three of those teams were based in New South Wales, including a Central Coast team.

=== Central Coast: ARC ===
Central Coast logo 2007.

The Central Coast Rays team was officially launched in March 2007 by the New South Wales Rugby Union (NSWRU). The Rays' emerald and navy colours represented the ocean and bush landscape of the region. The team logo featured a manta ray in navy blue, outlined in white, on a stylised emerald green and white rugby ball.

The Rays' local rivals in the ARC were the Sydney Fleet and the Western Sydney Rams. The three ARC teams from New South Wales were aligned with existing clubs and regions. The clubs aligned with the Central Coast Rays were Gordon, Manly, Northern Suburbs, and Warringah, from the Shute Shield competition, as well as the Central Coast Waves.

The Central Coast Rays played their home games at the Bluetongue Central Coast Stadium at Gosford, on the New South Wales Central Coast. Bluetongue Stadium, with an all-seater capacity of 20,159, had previously hosted numerous rugby union fixtures including Central Coast Waves matches and New South Wales Waratahs matches during the Australian Provincial Championship.

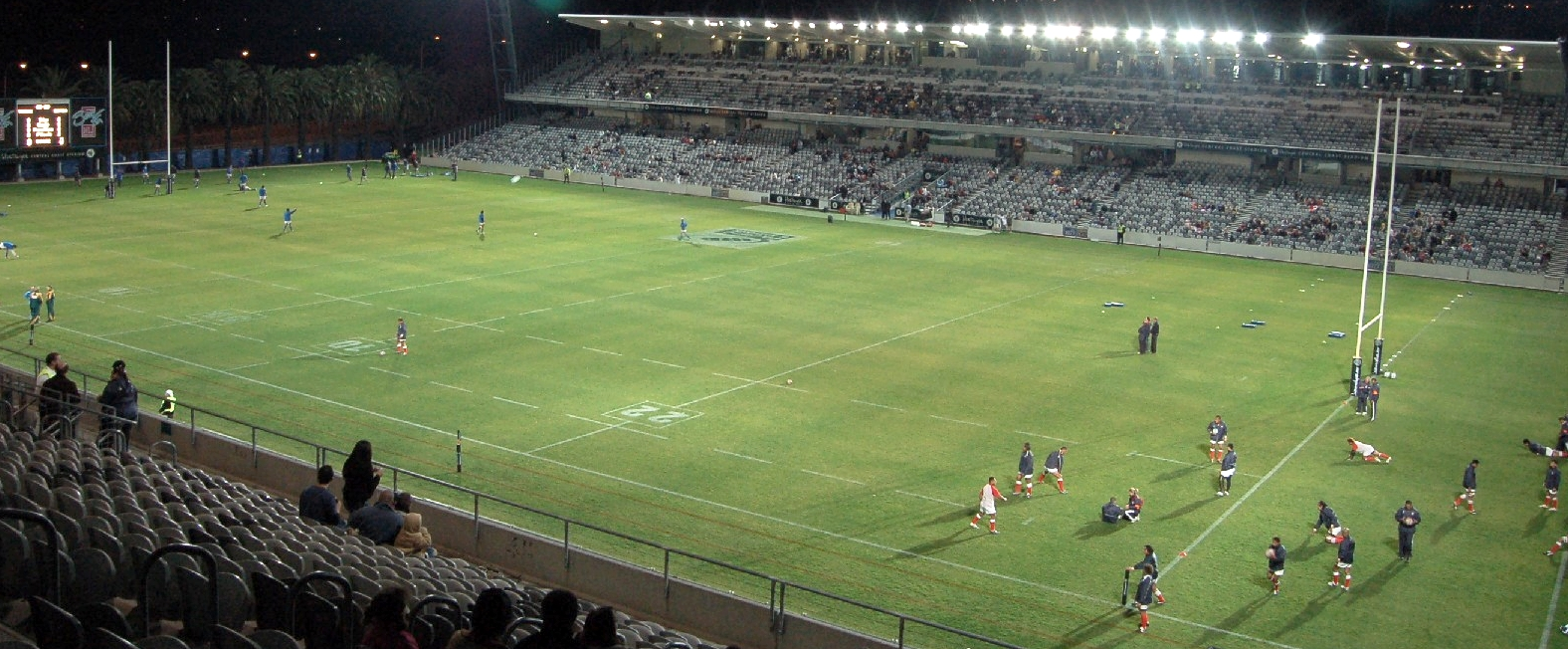
Rays played at Bluetongue Stadium in 2007

John McKee was the head coach of the Central Coast team. He had previously coached the Eastwood club and worked with French club Montferrand and Irish team Connacht.

After finishing second on the league table, the Central Coast Rays came from behind against the Perth Spirit in their semi-final, winning 27 to 19. The Rays hosted the Melbourne Rebels in the inaugural ARC Grand Final and won 20 to 12, becoming the inaugural (and only) champions of the ARC.

The Australian Rugby Championship was terminated at the end of 2007 after only one season of competition, with the Australian Rugby Union citing higher costs than budgeted and further projected financial losses. The Central Coast Rays team was disbanded at the end of the ARC.

=== North Harbour ===
North Harbour Rays (left); Sydney Rays (right) logos

The National Rugby Championship was announced in December 2013 to commence in 2014 with expressions of interest open to any interested parties and the accepted bids decided early in 2014.

In March 2014 it was announced that the Rays would be revived as the North Harbour Rays to compete in the new National Rugby Championship. The new Rays team was backed by a consortium of the same four Shute Shield clubs involved in earlier Central Coast Rays team: Manly, Warringah, Northern Suburbs and Gordon.

The team played in a quartered harlequin-style strip composed of blue, red, and two shades of green from the four constituent clubs. The sleeves were gold and black, collar and shorts were white and all four clubs' colours were featured on the socks.

The Rays secured Macquarie University as their principal partner on a two-year deal, to be officially be known as the Macquarie University North Harbour Rays for the 2014 and 2015 NRC seasons.

Phil Blake was initially appointed as the Rays head coach for the 2014 season, with Scott Fava, Haig Sare and Geoff Townsend as part of the coaching staff, but after Blake accepted a coaching opportunity with Leicester Tigers, Geoff Townsend was promoted to the head coaching position,

Damien Cummins replaced Fava as the forwards coach in 2014, and Greg Peterson was named as captain. In 2015, Townsend was reappointed as head coach, and Luke Holmes was named as captain.

=== Sydney ===
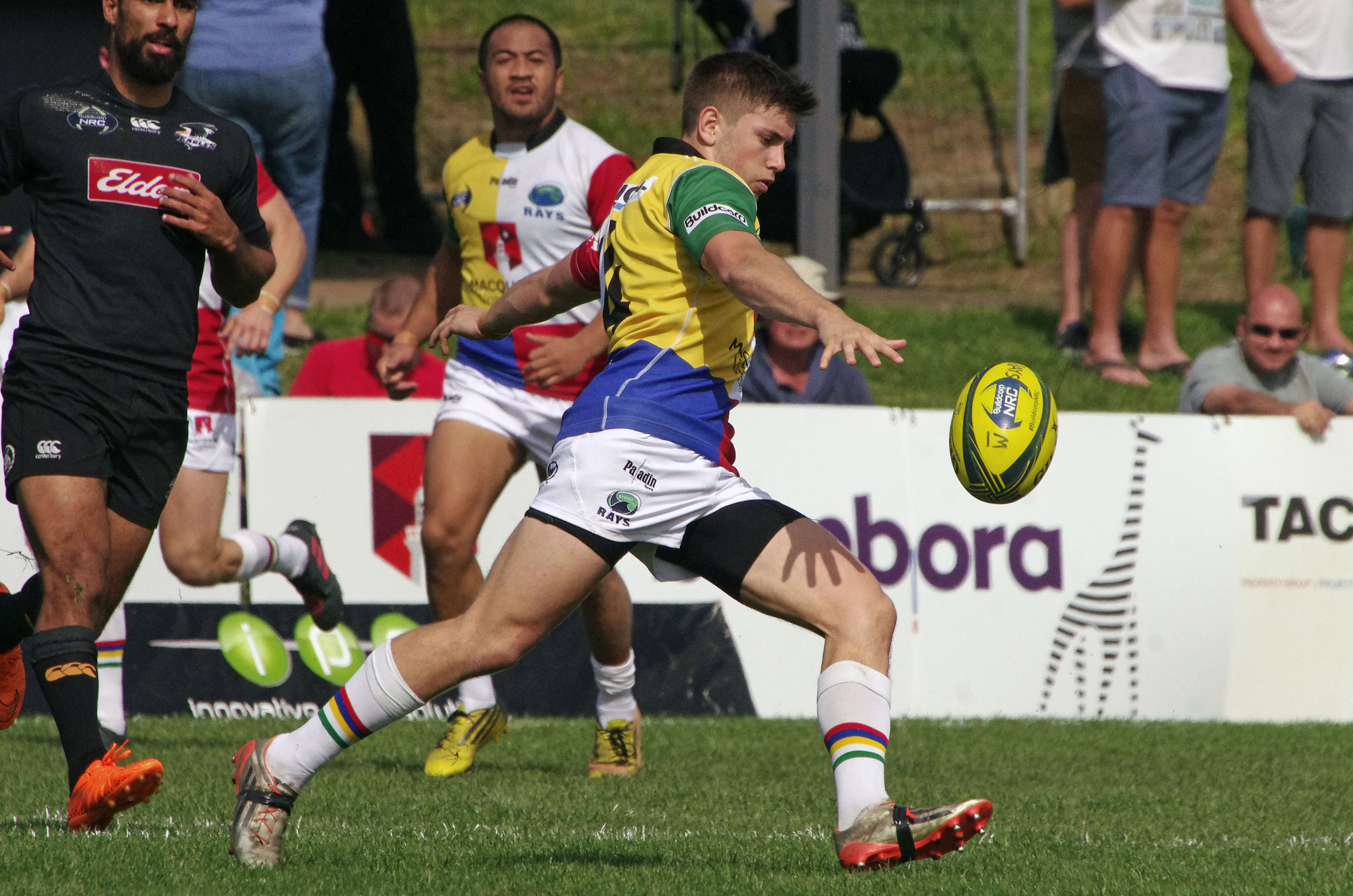
Josh Turner kicks ahead for Sydney in 2016

The team was renamed the Sydney Rays for the 2016 season. Southern Districts considered switching allegiance to the Rays in 2016, but remained with the Rams. Damien Cummins was initially named as head coach in 2016 but he stepped down and Simon Cron was appointed to the job. The Rays performed well that year and lost only once in the regular season – to eventual minor premiers NSW Country – before being knocked out in a semi-final by the Perth Spirit, who went on to win the NRC title.

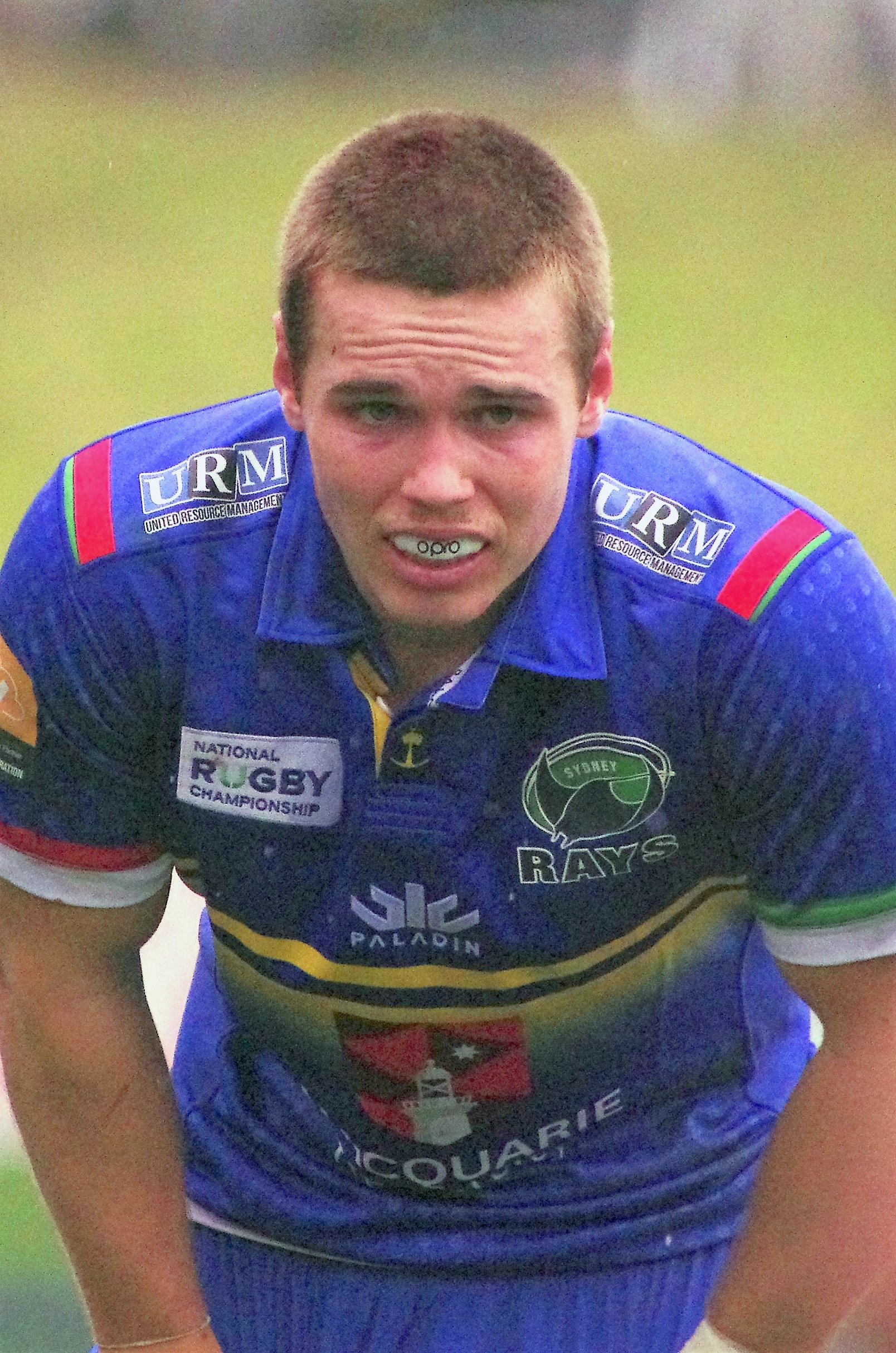
Will Harrison, 2018

Two wooden spoon seasons followed in 2017 and 2018 under, respectively, Julian Huxley and Chris Whitaker. The Rays' moniker and logo were dropped in 2019, a year after New South Wales Rugby had taken control of the Sydney team. Whitaker was reappointed head coach and Sydney adopted the traditional masoned crown and anchor insignia of the Sydney Rugby Union for the NRC team's logo, although the anchor had been used on the plaquet of the collar and in promotional material the year before. The Sydney Fleet ARC team had a similar crest in 2007.

== Team colours ==
The Sydney team plays in a blue jersey with two yellow hoops on the chest that is based on the traditional design worn by Sydney representative teams for many years. The blue and yellow colours were adopted in 2018, and are the colours featured on the City of Sydney coat of arms.

For the ARC in 2007, the Central Coast Rays played in a predominantly green and blue jersey. From 2014 to 2017, the North Harbour Rays team wore harlequin-style quartered strips in the various colours of its four constituent clubs.

2007 (ARC)	2014–2015	2016–2017	2018	2019

== Home grounds ==
Previous home venues
Venue	Location	Capacity
Brookvale Oval	Brookvale	23,000
Central Coast Stadium	Gosford	20,059
Concord Oval	Concord	20,000
Leichhardt Oval	Leichhardt	20,000
Macquarie University	Macquarie Park	3,000
Manly Oval	Manly	5,000
North Sydney Oval	North Sydney	20,000
Pittwater Park	Warriewood	10,000

As of 2019, Sydney play their home matches at Woollahra Oval No.1. The team has its training base at the University of NSW in Sydney's eastern suburbs, the same facility used by the Waratahs.

From 2014 to 2017, the team played at several venues north of the harbour including Macquarie University and Brookvale Oval, as well as the home grounds of three of the four clubs from the Ray's ownership consortium at the time: Northern Suburbs, Manly and Warringah (i.e. at North Sydney Oval, Manly Oval and Pittwater Park, respectively). In 2018, the Sydney Rays played south of the harbour at Concord, Leichhardt and Woollahra.

For the ARC in 2007, the Rays played at Bluetongue Central Coast Stadium.

== Supporters ==
With the reemergence of the competition in the form of the NRC, fans from Manly and Warringah rugby heartland - tragic supporters of the game - formed the 'STRAYS'. In the spirit of rugby and the NRC they came together to make sure the new club had support in the local community and to 'enrich the sideline experience'. Its members were drawn to the common cause by the founder, Michael Gordon.

== Records ==
=== Honours ===
- **National Rugby Championship**
  - Playoff appearances: 2016
- **Australian Rugby Championship**
  - Champions: 2007

=== Season standings ===
National Rugby Championship

Year	Pos	Pld	W	D	L	F	A	+/-	BP	Pts	Play-offs
2019	8th	7	1	0	6	220	325	−105	2	6	Did not compete
2018	8th	7	0	0	7	167	364	−197	1	1	Did not compete
2017	8th	8	3	0	5	238	322	–84	1	13	Did not compete
2016	2nd	7	6	0	1	258	174	+84	3	27	Lost semifinal by 24–42 to Perth Spirit
2015	7th	8	2	0	6	275	339	−64	3	11	Did not compete
2014	7th	8	2	2	4	240	327	−87	0	12	Did not compete

Australian Rugby Championship

Year	Pos	Pld	W	D	L	F	A	+/-	BP	Pts	Play-offs
2007	**2nd**	8	5	0	3	268	159	109	6	**26**	Champions

=== Head coaches ===
- Chris Whitaker (2018–19)
- Julian Huxley (2017)
- Simon Cron (2016)
- Geoff Townsend (2014–15)
- John McKee (2007)

=== Captains ===
- Lalakai Foketi (2019)
- Damien Fitzpatrick (2017–2018)
- Matt Lucas (2016)
- Luke Holmes (2015)
- Greg Peterson (2014)
- Cameron Treloar (2007)

=== Squads ===
2019 Sydney squad – NRC
Prop: (New Zealand) Charlie Abel; (Australia) Wayne Borsak; (Australia) Darcy Breen; (Australia) Rory O'Connor; (Australia) Tom Osborne; (Australia) Harrison Rorke; (Australia) Shambeckler Vui; Hooker: (England) Joe Cotton; (Australia) Ed Craig; (Australia) Declan Moore (Note: Moore, Digby, Graham (Rd 1), Edmed, Abrahams and Paterson (Rd 2).); Lock: (Australia) Jack Digby; (Australia) Ryan McCauley; (Australia) Christian Poidevin; (Scotland) Sam Thomson; Backrow: (New Zealand) Charlie Gamble; (Australia) Jordan Goddard; (Australia) Jack Hayson; (Australia) Josh Kemeny; (Australia) Tuitakau Kioa; (Scotland) Ruaridh Mackenzie; (Australia) Hugh Sinclair; (Australia) Lachlan Swinton	Scrum-half: (New Zealand) Jake Abel; (Australia) Michael McDonald; (Australia) Mitch Short; Fly-half: (Australia) Ben Donaldson; (Australia) Tane Edmed; (Australia) Will Harrison; Centre: (Australia) Ellis Abrahams; (Australia) Harry Burey; (Australia) Lalakai Foketi (c); (Australia) Ben Marr; Wing: (Australia) Cameron Clark; (Fiji) Tailiki Nadredre; (Australia) Henry Paterson; (Australia) James Ramm; (Australia) Triston Reilly (Note: Reilly was not named in the original squad, but was named in the team for Round 5.); (Samoa) Trent Winterstein; (Australia) Richard Wolfe; Fullback: (Australia) Tyson Davis; (Australia) Jaline Graham
Notes The initial squad was named in late August. Players joining in subsequent rounds were:
**Bold** denotes player is internationally capped. (c) Denotes team captain. ^{1} denotes marquee player.

2016 Sydney Rays squad – NRC
The following players were named in the Sydney Rays' squad for the 2016 National Rugby Championship:
**Props**: Lawrence Hunting; Ezra Luxton; Rory O'Connor; Angus Ta'avao; **Hookers**: Damien Fitzpatrick; **James Hilterbrand**; **Locks**: James Brown; Adrian Hall; Nick Palmer; Angus Ryan	**Loose forwards**: Harry Bergelin; Jack Dempsey; **Michael Hooper**^{1}; Will Miller; Hugh Sinclair; Michael Smith; Michael Wells; **Scrum-halves**: Michael Dowsett; Matt Lucas (c); Dewett Roos; **Fly-halves**: Sam Lane; Angus Sinclair	**Centres**: Harry Jones; Dennis Pili-Gaitau; Irae Simone; Seb Wileman; **Wingers**: Tyson Davis; Con Foley; **Rob Horne**^{1}; Jonathan Malo; Richard Woolf; **Fullbacks**: Cameron Clark; Josh Turner; (c) Team captain **Bold** denotes internationally capped players at the time^{1} Allocated national player additional to contracted squad.

2015 North Harbour Rays squad – NRC
The following players were named in the North Harbour Rays' squad for the 2015 National Rugby Championship:
**Props**: Wayne Borsak; Mitch Lewis; Lawrence Hunting; Alexander Northam; Rory O'Connor; **Scott Sio**; **Hookers**: Vance Elloitt; James Hilterbrand; Luke Holmes (c); James Wilkinson; **Locks**: Ed Gower; Richard Hooper; Nick Palmer; Harry Rorke; Cameron Treloar; Ruairidh Wilson	**Loose forwards**: Harry Bergelin; Jack Dempsey; **Michael Hooper**^{1}; Mark Johnson; Boyd Killingworth; Sam Ward; **Scrum-halves**: Tim Donlan; Tim Duchene; Josh Holmes; **Fly-halves**: Hamish Angus; Sam Lane	**Centres**: John Fakai; Tom Hill; Dennis Pili-Gaitau; John Porch; **Wingers**: Michael Adams; Sione 'Ala; Tyson Davis; Alex Northam; Richard Woolf; **Fullbacks**: Dave Feltscheer; Reece Hodge; (c) Team captain **Bold** denotes internationally capped players at the time^{1} Allocated national player additional to contracted squad.

2014 North Harbour Rays squad – NRC
The following players were named in the North Harbour Rays' squad for the 2014 National Rugby Championship:
**Props**: **Leeroy Atalifo**; Nick Fraser; Kevin McNamara; Dane Maraki; Rory O'Connor; Mitch Lewis; **Hookers**: Luke Holmes; David Porecki; **Locks**: **Scott Fardy**^{1}; Ed Gower; Ryan Melrose; Greg Peterson (c)	**Loose forwards**: Kotoni Ale; Harry Bergelin; James Cunningham; Jack Dempsey; **Michael Hooper**^{1}; Boyd Killingworth; **Wycliff Palu**^{1}; Sam Ward; Michael Wells; **Scrum-halves**: Josh Holmes; Terry Preston; Matt Lucas; **Fly-halves**: Hamish Angus; Scott Daruda; **Sam VaeVae**	**Centres**: Jac Cameron; Mali Hingano; Tom Matthews; Brian Sefanaia; **Wingers**: Michael Adams; Harry Jones; Sireli Tagicakibau; **Fullbacks**: Cam Crawford; David Feltscheer; (c) Team captain **Bold** denotes internationally capped players at the time^{1} Allocated national player additional to contracted squad.

2007 Central Coast Rays squad – ARC
**Props**: **Al Baxter**; Ofa Fainga’anuku; Nick Lah; Rod Moore; Aaron Tawera; **Hookers**: Alex Gluth; Al Manning; Dustin McGregor; **Locks**: John Adams; Nifo Nifo; Chris Thompson; Cameron Treloar	**Loose forwards**: Ross Duncan; Steve Evans; Jared Waerea-Hargreaves; Jason Peseta; **Wycliff Palu**; Vili Ratu; Beau Robinson; Dylan Sigg; **Scrum-halves**: Brett Sheehan; **Fly-halves**: Clint Eadie; David Harvey; **Sam Norton-Knight**	**Centres**: Sam Harris; Ben Jacobs; **Wings**: Jordan Macey; Pat McCabe; Jye Mullane; Andrew Smith; **Fullbacks**: Peter Hewat; (c) Team captain **Bold** denotes internationally capped players at the time

== Gallery ==
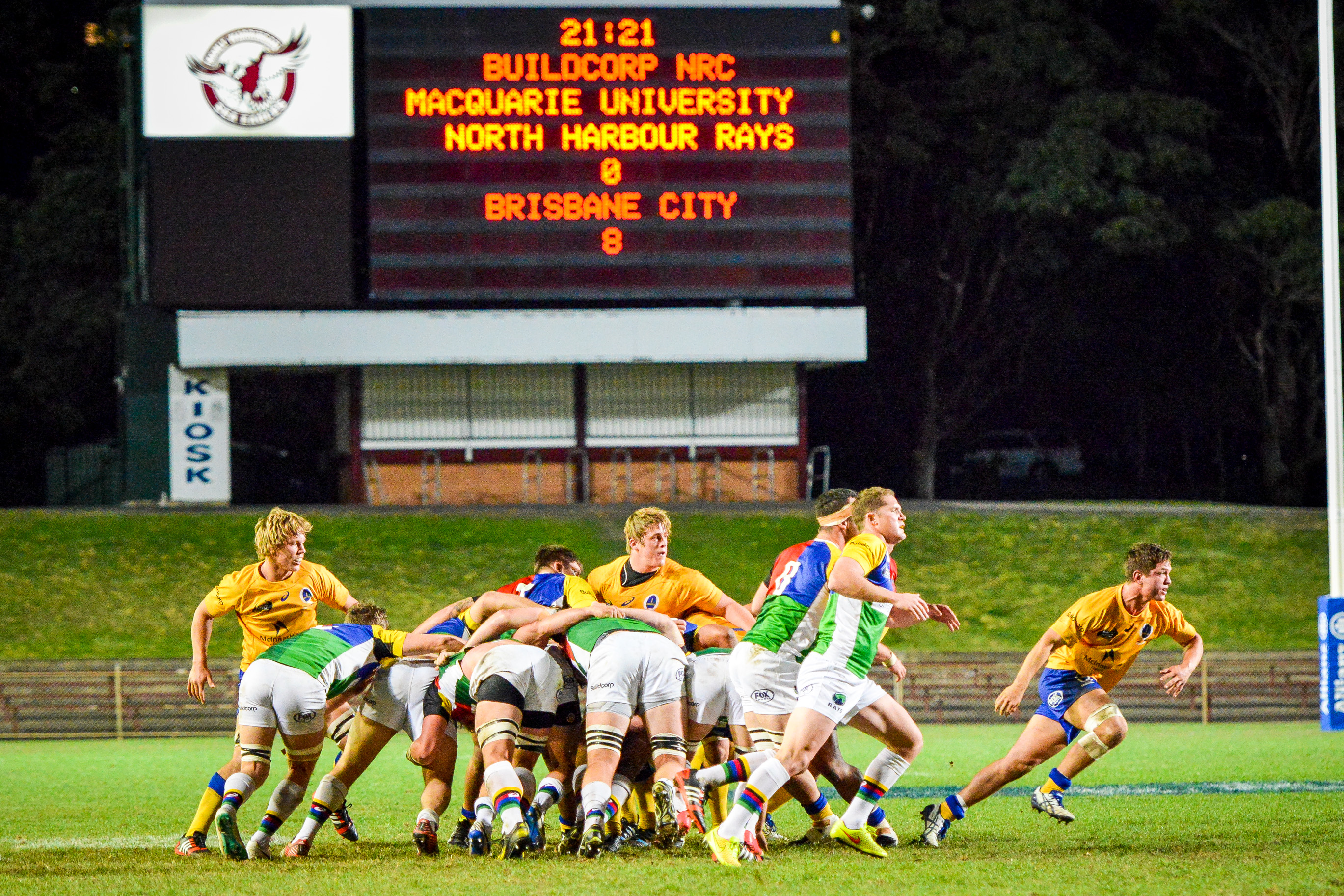
North Harbour Rays scrum under the Scoreboard

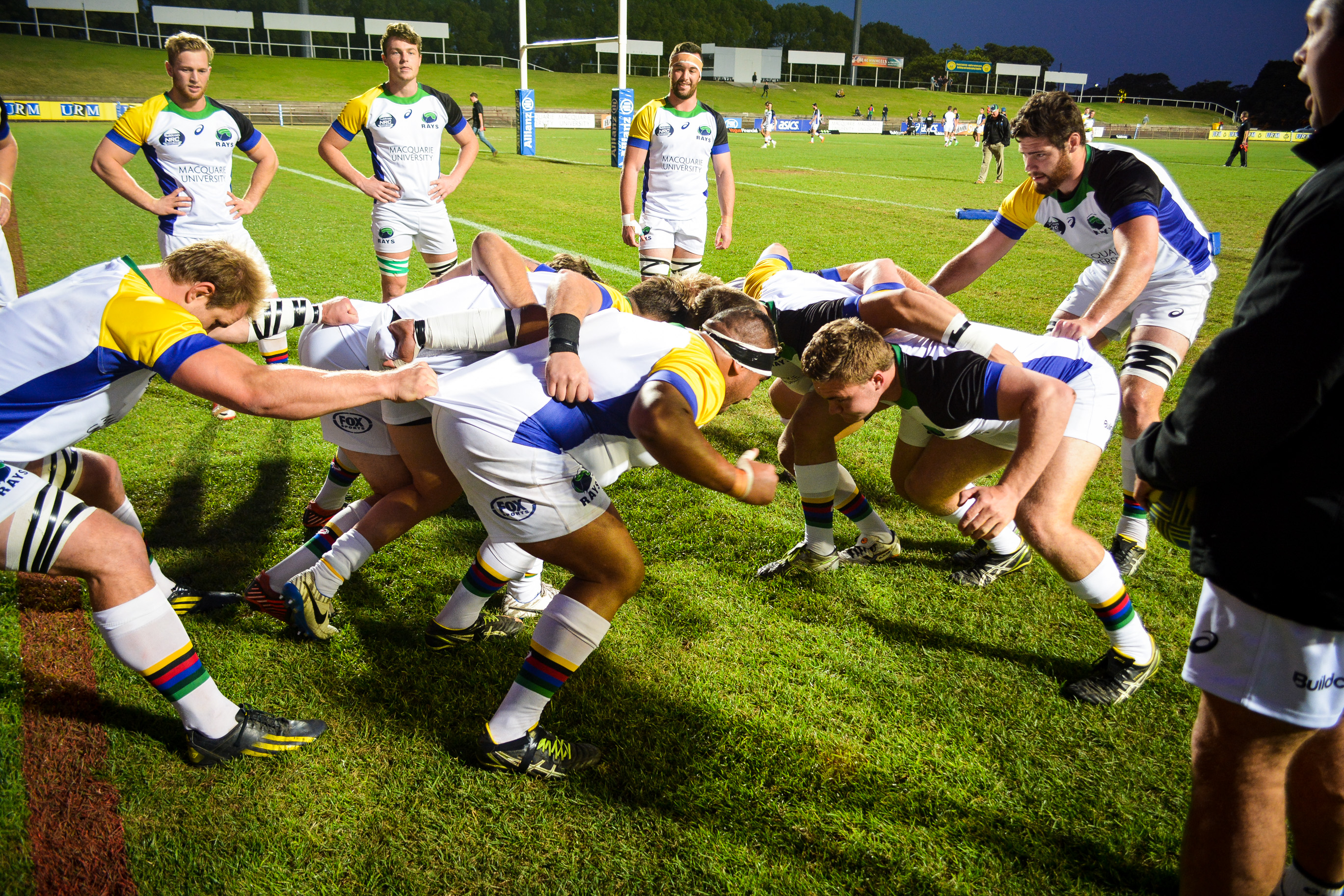
North Harbour Rays warm up pre Round 8 game

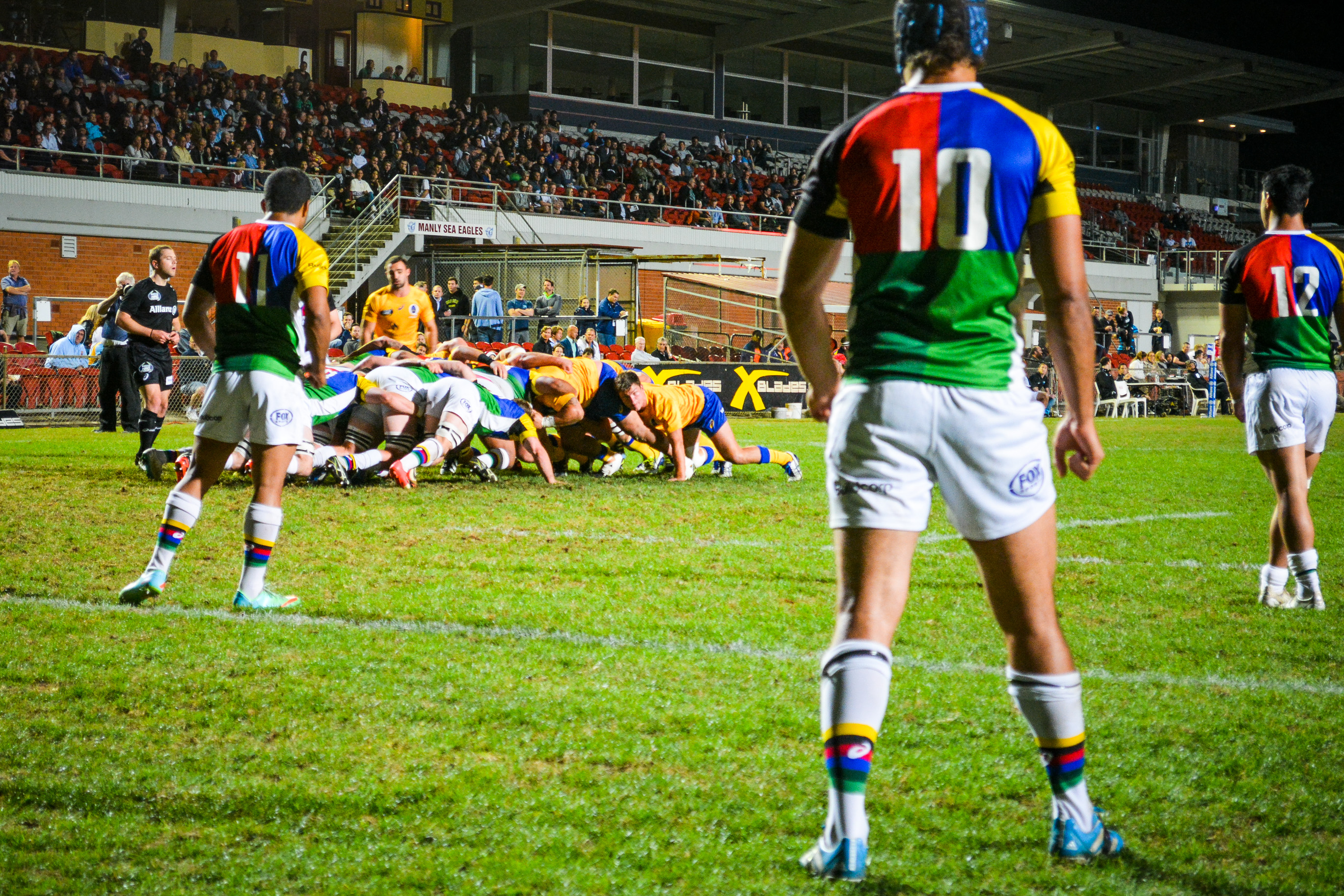
North Harbour Rays scrum under the Grandstand

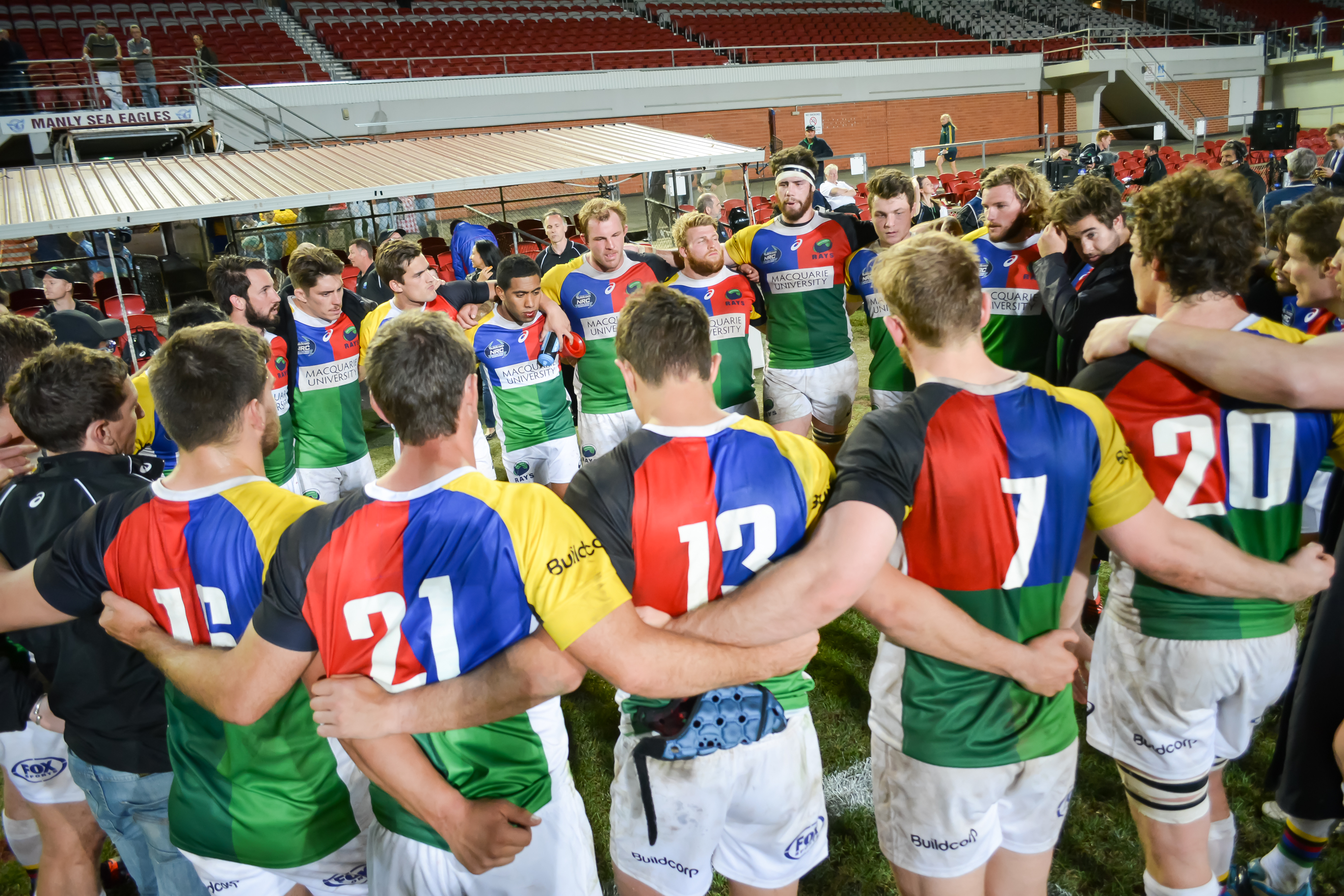
North Harbour Rays post match huddle

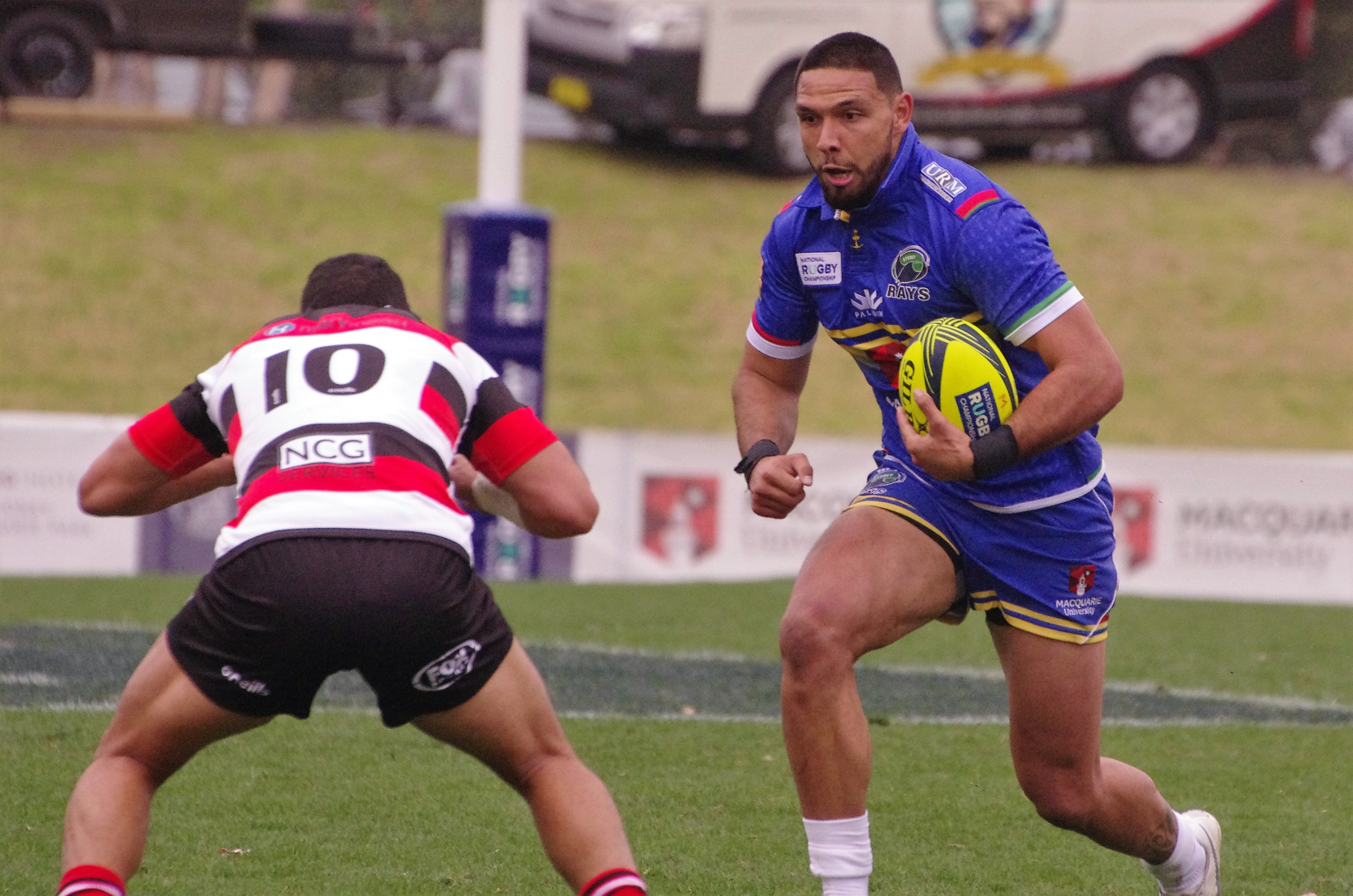
Curtis Rona playing for Sydney in 2018

== See also ==
- New South Wales Waratahs
- Shute Shield
- Gordon RFC
- Manly RUFC
- Northern Suburbs Rugby Club
- Warringah Rugby Club
