= Charlie Abel =

Australian rugby union player

- Born: Charles Abel; 29 January 1992 (age 34) Melbourne, Australia
- Height: 180 cm (5 ft 11 in)
- Weight: 122 kg (19 st 3 lb)
- Notable relative(s): Robbie Abel (brother); Jake Abel (brother)

Rugby union career
- Position: Prop
Senior career
Years	Team	Apps	(Points)
2018	NSW Country Eagles	1	(0)
2019	Sydney	6	(5)
2021–2022	LA Giltinis		
2023	Chicago Hounds		
- Correct as of 6 March 2023
Super Rugby
Years	Team	Apps	(Points)
2020	Waratahs	0	(0)
2020	Rebels	1	(0)
- Correct as of 22 December 2020

Charlie Abel (born in Australia) is an Australian rugby union player who currently plays for the Chicago Hounds in Major League Rugby (MLR). His playing position is at prop.

He previously played for the LA Giltinis in the MLR and an injury cover for the NSW Waratahs in Super Rugby.

== Super Rugby statistics ==
As of 12 September 2020

Season	Team	Games	Starts	Sub	Mins	Tries	Cons	Pens	Drops	Points	Yel	Red
2020	Waratahs	0	0	0	0	0	0	0	0	0	0	0
2020 AU	Rebels	1	0	1	19	0	0	0	0	0	0	0
Total		1	0	1	19	0	0	0	0	0	0	0
