= Jake Abel (rugby union) =

Australian rugby union player (born 1997)

Jacob Abel
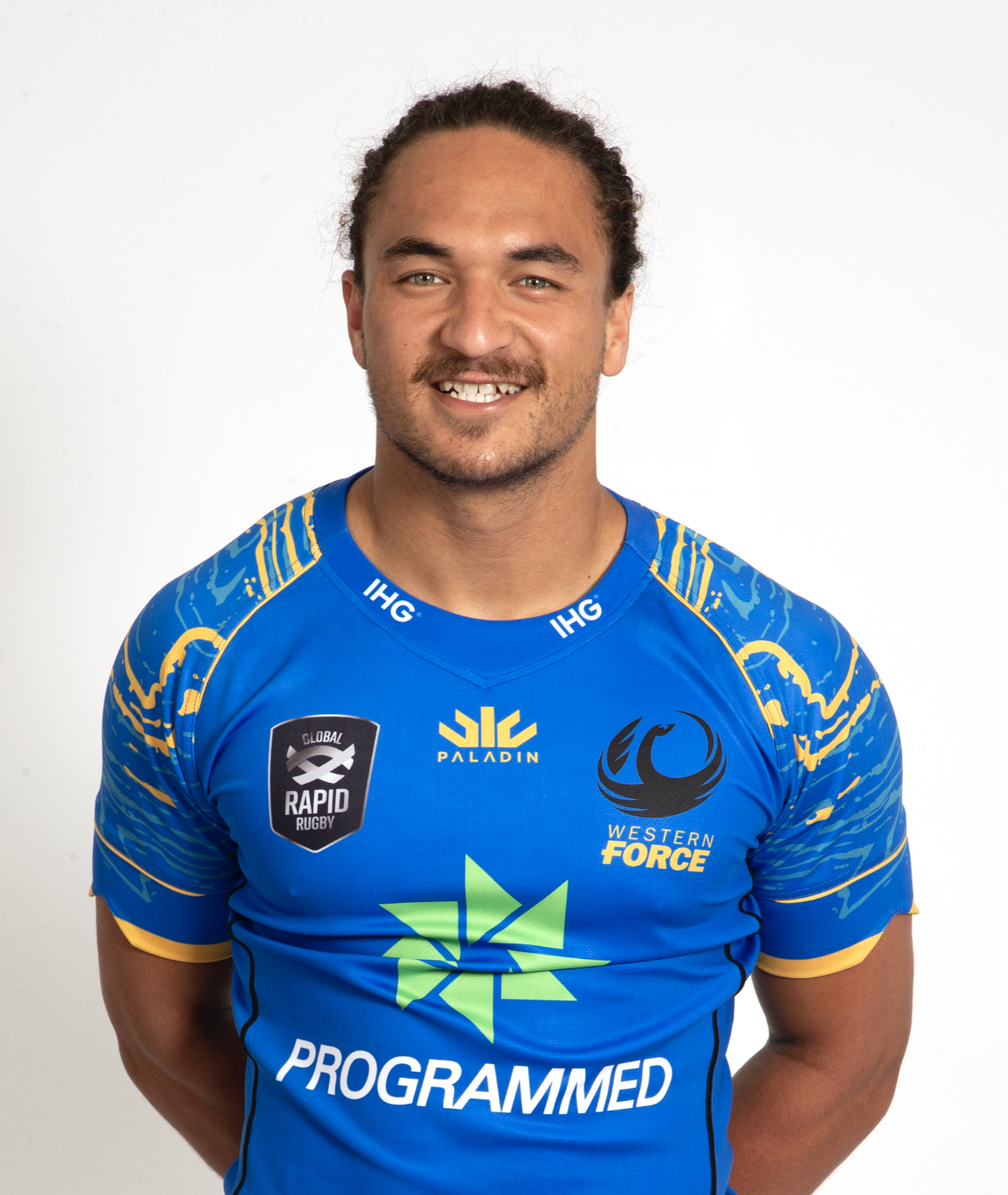
- Abel in 2019
- Born: Jacob Rhys Abel; 30 October 1997 (age 29) Werribee, Victoria, Australia
- Height: 174 cm (5 ft 9 in)
- Weight: 92 kg (203 lb; 14 st 7 lb)
- School: St Edmunds College Canberra
- Notable relative(s): Robbie Abel (brother); Charlie Abel (brother)

Rugby union career
- Position(s): Scrum-half, Centre
- Current team: Skyactivs Hiroshima
Amateur team(s)
Years	Team	Apps	(Points)
- Eastern Suburbs RUFC
–	Tauranga Sports Rugby club		
–	Gordon RFC		
Senior career
Years	Team	Apps	(Points)
2018	Canberra Vikings	1	(0)
2019	Sydney	4	(0)
2022–	Skyactivs Hiroshima	42	(80)
- Correct as of 17 June 2025
Super Rugby
Years	Team	Apps	(Points)
2020	Force	5	
- Correct as of 23 February 2024

Jake Abel (born 30 October 1997 in Australia) is an Australian rugby union player who plays for the Force in Global Rapid Rugby and the Super Rugby AU competition. His original playing position is scrum-half. He was named in the Force squad for the Global Rapid Rugby competition in 2020.
