= Tooheys New Cup =

The Tooheys New Cup, or TNC, was a rugby union competition established by the New South Wales Rugby Union (NSWRU) in 2002. Played in the second half of the rugby season after the Super 12 competition was completed, it was intended as a stepping stone between the existing grade rugby (see Shute Shield) and Super Rugby competitions. The Tooheys New Cup ran for five seasons before it ceased to exist, with the short-lived Australian Rugby Championship taking its place in the second half of the rugby season of 2007. From 2008 onwards, an extended Shute Shield covered the entire season.

Open to the existing twelve grade clubs, the TNC featured Super Rugby players not on international duty and the occasional Wallaby. In seasons 2004-2005 the Canberra Vikings competed in the Tooheys New Cup, in the 2005-2006 & 2007 the Central Coast Waves & Illawarra Warriors took part in addition to the Sydney-based sides.

== Tooheys New Cup Grand Finals ==
- 2002 - Eastwood 19 Sydney University 15
- 2003 - Eastwood 29 Randwick 14
- 2004 - Randwick 35 Eastwood 22
- 2005 - Sydney University 41 Eastwood 5
- 2006 - Sydney University 16 Randwick 10

== Tooheys New Cup Teams ==
- Eastern Suburbs RUFC
- Eastwood Rugby Club
- Gordon RFC
- Manly RUFC
- Northern Suburbs Rugby Club
- Parramatta Two Blues
- Penrith Emus Rugby
- Randwick Rugby Club
- Southern Districts Rugby Club
- Sydney University Football Club
- Warringah Rugby Club
- West Harbour RFC

== See also ==
- New South Wales Rugby Union
- Shute Shield
