= Damien Fitzpatrick =

Australian rugby union player

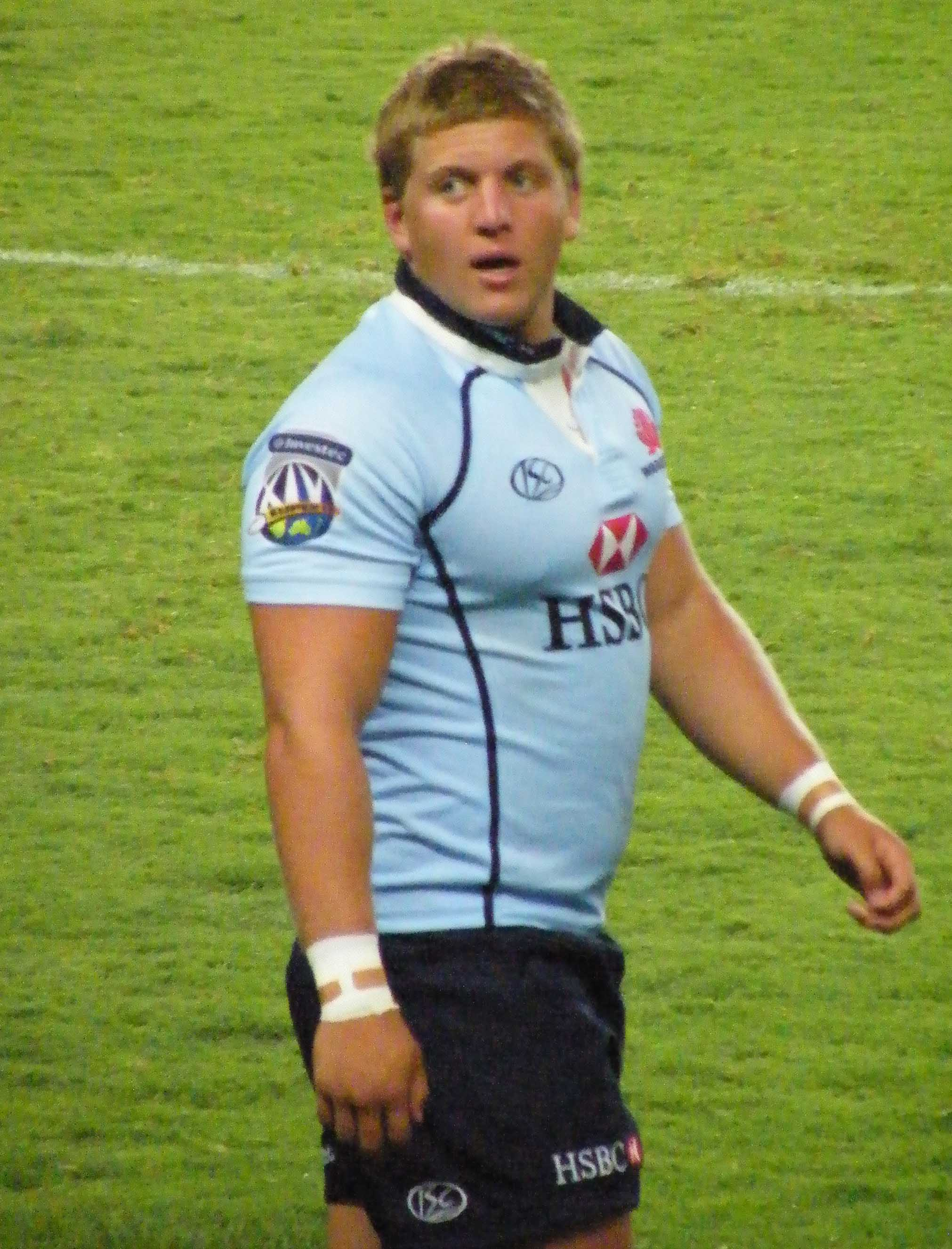
- Born: Damien Fitzpatrick; 8 June 1989 (age 37) Sydney, Australia
- Height: 1.83 m (6 ft 0 in)
- Weight: 106 kg (16 st 10 lb)

Rugby union career
- Position: Hooker
Senior career
Years	Team	Apps	(Points)
2009–2017	Eastwood	34	(50)
2013–2016	Lyon	34	(35)
2016-19	Sydney Rays	19	(50)
2019	Stade Français Paris	4	(0)
- Correct as of 20 May 2026
Super Rugby
Years	Team	Apps	(Points)
2009–2020	Waratahs	73	(25)
- Correct as of 20 May 2026

Damien Nicholas Fitzpatrick (born 8 June 1989) is an Australian former professional rugby union player of Irish descent. He last played for the New South Wales Waratahs in Super Rugby. He was captain of the Sydney Rays team in the National Rugby Championship in 2017 and 2018. His position of choice was Hooker.

== Early life ==
Damien Fitzpatrick was born in Sydney, Australia and grew up on the Lower North Shore. He began playing rugby at the Mosman Whales club where he was initially a breakaway and No. 8. During his schoolboy years at St. Joseph's College, Hunters Hill he switched to hooker, the position he continued playing for his representative and professional career.

In 2007 Fitzpatrick captained the St. Joseph's First XV to an undefeated premiership. His form during the competition earned him further representative honours as he captained the Combined GPS First XV and represented NSW at the Australian Schools Championships. He was awarded the highest honour in schoolboy rugby by being named captain of the Australian Schoolboys XV. The team went undefeated that year defeating touring teams from England, Samoa and New Zealand.

== Rugby career ==
Contracted by the NSW Waratahs in 2008, Fitzpatrick was named captain of the Australian Under 20s for the Junior World Cup held in Japan in 2009. His team played some outstanding rugby to reach the semifinal in Tokyo, but a brave Junior Wallabies side was defeated 31–17 by a powerful second-half surge by the Baby All Blacks captained by Aaron Cruden.

Fitzpatrick made his senior debut for the Waratahs during the 2009 Super 14 season against the Crusaders. He also continued playing club rugby for Eastwood, and was part of their Shute Shield premiership-winning team in 2011.

After five years with the Waratahs and a run of season-ending injuries that kept him sidelined for most of 2012 and 2013, he was contracted by French club Lyon. Fitzpatrick helped Lyon win the Rugby Pro D2 competition twice, in 2014 and 2016, to gain promotion to the country's Top 14 premier division.

His form offshore was noticed up by Wallaby coach Michael Cheika in 2016, and Fitzpatrick returned to Super Rugby in 2017 after being contracted by the NSW Waratahs. Fitzpatrick has been signed He was appointed captain of the Sydney Rays for the National Rugby Championship in 2017 and 2018. Fitzpatrick has again been signed with the NSW Waratahs for the 2020 Super Ruby season which will be his ninth season. Fitzpatrick will have a short stint in France before returning in time for the 2020 Super Rugby season.

Fitzpatrick is also the President of the Rugby Union Player's Association (RUPA).

== Outside rugby ==
FitzPatrick has a Bachelor of Business degree from Macquarie University and is currently completing his MBA at Macquarie University.
