= Tom Osborne (rugby union) =

Australian rugby union player

- Full name: Thomas Osborne
- Born: 8 July 1998 (age 28) Australia
- Height: 188 cm (6 ft 2 in)
- Weight: 118 kg (260 lb; 18 st 8 lb)
- University: Sydney University; Oxford University

Rugby union career
- Position: Loose-head Prop
- Current team: Harlequins
Senior career
| Years | Team | Apps | (Points) |
| 2018–2021 | Sydney University | 30 | (5) |
| 2019 | Sydney Rays | 2 | (0) |
| 2021–2023 | Oxford University RFC | 16 | (0) |
| 2021–2025 | Harlequins | 10 | (5) |
| 2022–2025 | → London Scottish (loan) | 23 | (10) |
| 2025- | Western Force | 0 | (0) |
- Correct as of 3 March 2025

Tom Osborne (born 8 July 1998) is an Australian rugby union player who plays as a Loosehead prop for English Premiership side, Harlequins. He previously captained the Oxford Blues team.

== Club career ==
He began his playing career at Sydney University in 2018 playing in the New South Wales Shute Shield featuring 32 times, all while he was completing a Bachelor of Laws. Winning the New South Wales Shute Shield in 2019, then was given the role of captain the year after. He featured for Sydney Rays in the 2019 National Rugby Championship, featuring twice. He joined Oxford in 2021, in his second season at the club he was named the university's Varsity Captain for the 2022 season.

In 2021 he went on trial at Harlequins, making his debut for the Twickenham-based side in the Premiership Rugby Cup against Saracens coming off the bench. In the following season he scored his first try for the club, going over the whitewash against rivals Saracens. While with Harlequins he has spent time on loan at London Scottish in the RFU Championship. Making his debut for the side against newly promoted Caldy FC, he later featured again off the bench against the Exeter Chiefs in the Premiership Rugby Cup. He captained Harlequins against his former club, Oxford University, leading the London side to a 7–45 win.

Ahead of the 2025 Super Rugby Pacific season, Osborne returned to his homeland and joined Western Force as injury cover for Harry Hoopert who suffered an ACL injury.
