= Luke Holmes (rugby union, born 1983) =

Australian rugby union player

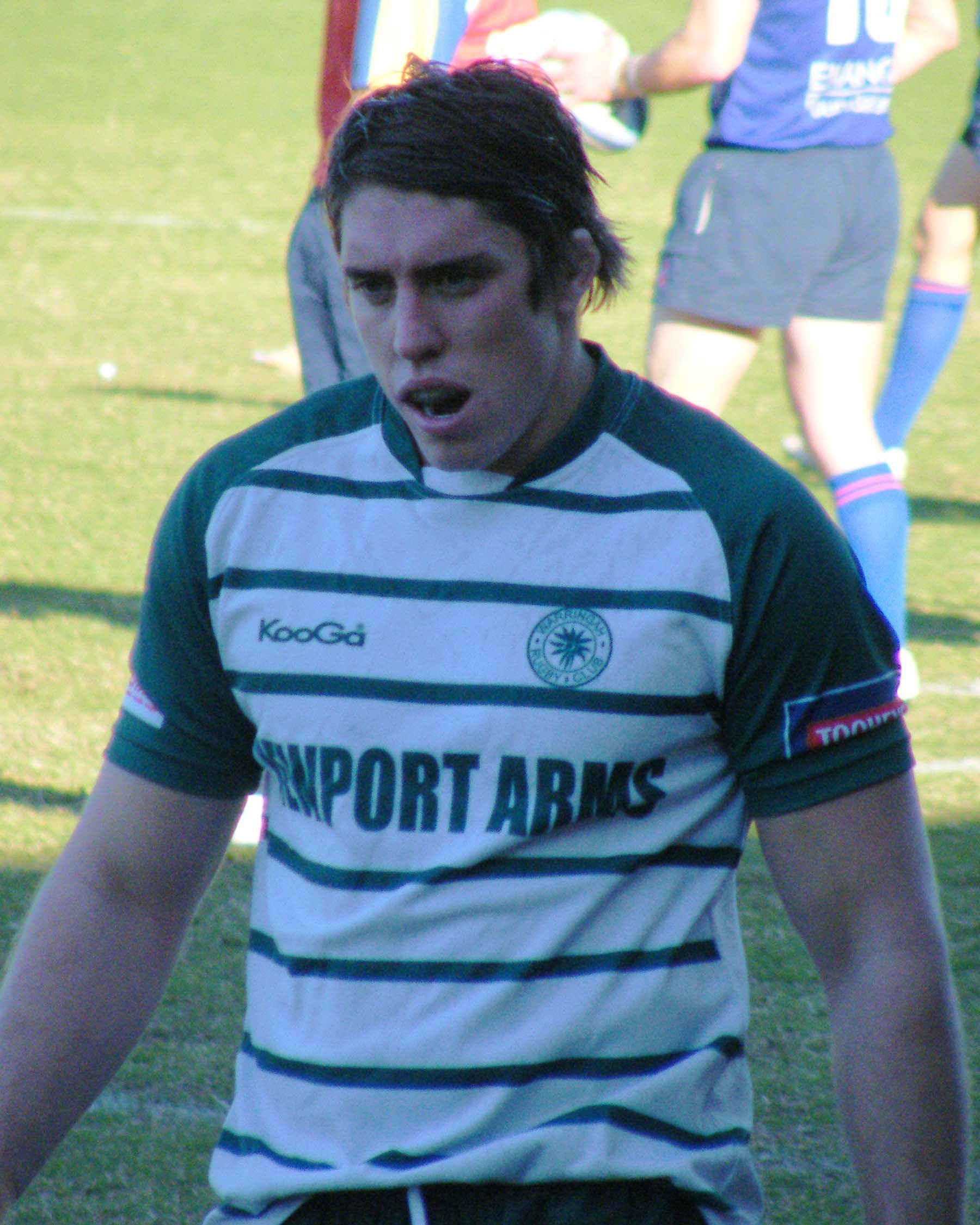
- Born: Luke Holmes; 14 November 1983 (age 42) Mona Vale, Australia
- Height: 1.84 m (6 ft 1/2 in)
- Weight: 106 kg (16 st 10 lb)

Rugby union career
- Position: Hooker
- Current team: Warringah Rats
Senior career
Years	Team	Apps	(Points)
2007	Perth Spirit	4	(0)
2014−	North Harbour Rays	16	(25)
–	Warringah Rats		
- Correct as of 4 November 2015
Super Rugby
Years	Team	Apps	(Points)
2006–09	Force	22	(0)
2011–12	Rebels	5	(0)
2013	Waratahs	6	(0)
2014	Brumbies	1	(0)
- Correct as of 27 July 2013

Luke Holmes (born 14 November 1983 in Mona Vale, Australia) is an Australian former rugby union footballer. His regular playing position was hooker. He represented the Melbourne Rebels in the 2012 Super Rugby season having formerly played for the Western Force.

He was named in the New South Wales Waratahs playing squad for the 2013 Super Rugby season.
