= Cameron Treloar =

Australian rugby union player

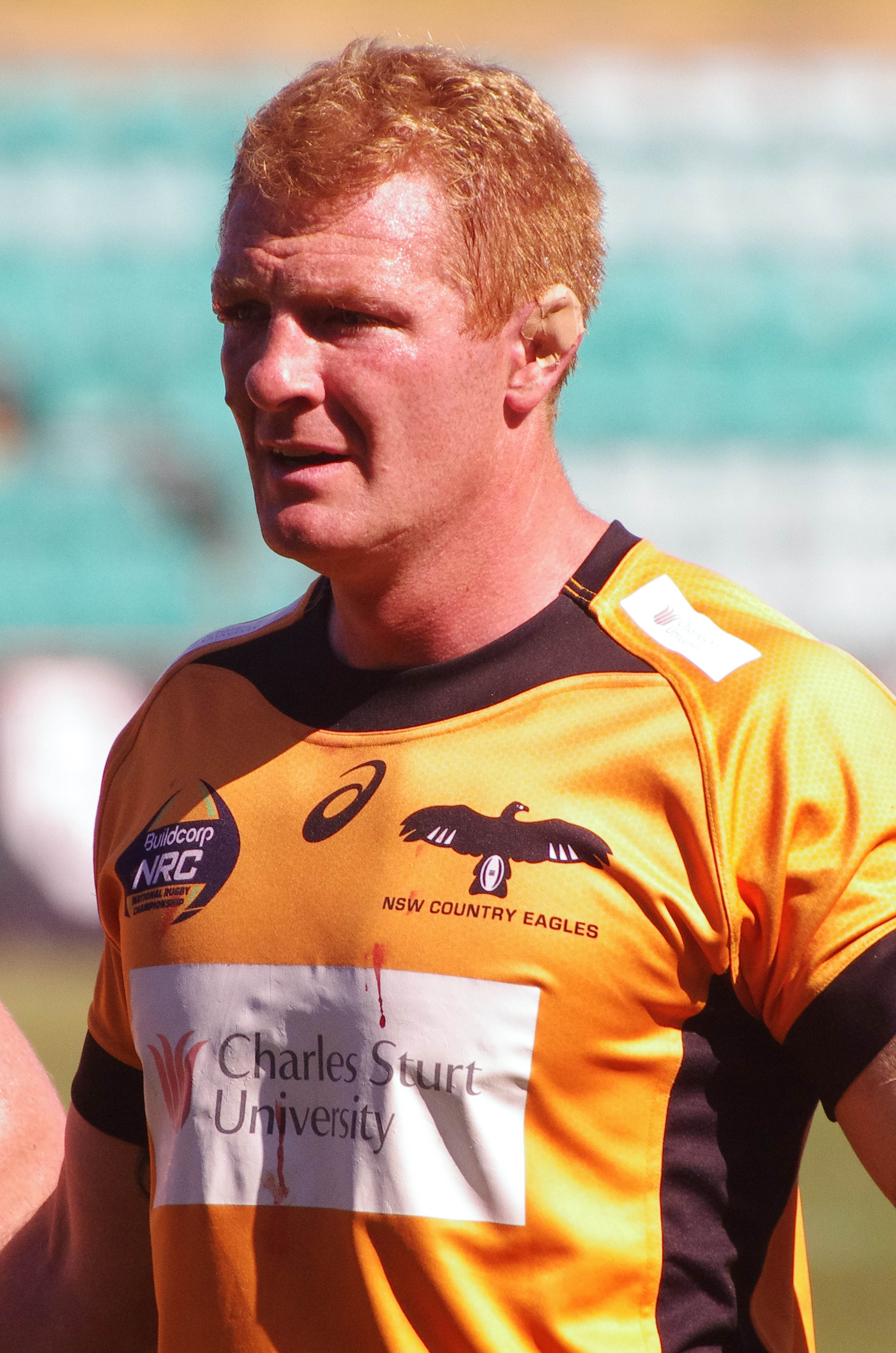
- Born: Cameron Treloar; 13 May 1980 (age 45) Cooma, Australia
- Height: 2 m (6 ft 7 in)
- Weight: 111 kg (17.5 st)
- School: St Joseph's College, Hunters Hill

Rugby union career
- Position: Lock
Senior career
Years	Team	Apps	(Points)
2006	Waratahs		
2007	Qld Reds	17	(0)
2007	CC Rays	8	(10)
2007–09	Calvisano	17	(0)
2009–10	I Cavalieri Prato	48	(10)
2010–11	A. Bayonnais	10	(0)
2011-14	Bordeaux	80	(15)
2014	New South Wales Country Eagles	9	(0)
2015	North Harbour Rays	6	(0)
2017	Warringah Rats	131	(25)

Cameron Treloar is an Australian rugby union player, formerly for Union Bordeaux Bègles in the Top 14.

== Career ==
Cameron Treloar began his career with the New South Wales Waratahs in the Super 14 competition in 2005 before moving to the Queensland Reds in 2006. In 2007, he captained the Central Coast Rays in the inaugural Australian Rugby Championship (ARC), winning the competition the only time it was played. At the end of the 2007 Super 14 season he left to play for the Italian club Calvisano in the Super 10 winning the Italian Championship in 2008.

He stayed there for two years and then signed with I Cavalieri Prato in 2009. At the end of the season he went on to sign with Aviron Bayonnais in the Top 14. In January 2011, after playing 10 matches Treloar was traded to Union Bordeaux Bègles in the Pro D2. Deciding to terminate his contract with Aviron he went on to sign a contract with Bordeaux for one and a half years. In 2011 Union Bordeaux Bègles won the 2010–11 Rugby Pro D2 season final promoting them to the Top 14. In 2012, he resigned with Bordeaux for a further 2 years, until he retired from professional rugby.

Treloar played for NSW Country Eagles in the 2014 National Rugby Championship (NRC), finishing runners up to Brisbane City, and then with the North Harbour Ray's in 2015.

In 2017, Treloar played with the Warringah Rats, winning the Shute Shield prior to moving into coaching.
