= Robbie Abel =

Australian rugby union player (born 1989)

- Full name: Robert Abel
- Born: 4 July 1989 (age 37) Orange, Australia
- Height: 1.83 m (6 ft 0 in)
- Weight: 112 kg (17 st 9 lb; 247 lb)
- School: St Edmund's College
- Notable relative(s): Charlie Abel (brother); Jake Abel (brother)

Rugby union career
- Position: Hooker
- Current team: Waratahs / Auckland
2013	Northland	9	(5)
2014	Perth Spirit	9	(25)
2015–2017	Canberra Vikings	34	(74)
2018–2022	Auckland	27	(15)
- Correct as of 15 October 2019
Super Rugby
Years	Team	Apps	(Points)
2014–2015	Force	0	(0)
2016–2018	Brumbies	36	(15)
2019	Rebels	7	(0)
2020–2021	Waratahs	17	(0)
- Correct as of 15 October 2019
International career
Years	Team	Apps	(Points)
2007	Australian Schoolboys	2	
2018–	Māori All Blacks	3	
Coaching career
- Years: Team
- 2022-2026: Utah Warriors
- 2026-Present: Seattle Seawolves
- 2026-Present: Northland
- 2026: ACT Brumbies

Robert Abel (born 4 July 1989) is an Australian born, New Zealand rugby union coach and former professional rugby union player. Having represented the Maori All Blacks at an international level. He is currently assistant coach of Northland Taniwha in the NPC and the Seattle Seawolves in Major League Rugby. He was named Head Coach of the Utah Warriors in 2025. He previously played hooker for the NSW Waratahs, Melbourne Rebels and for the ACT Brumbies in Super Rugby. Also representing the Canberra Vikings and Perth Spirit, and also played for Northland and Auckland.

== Career ==
Robbie Abel was selected for the Australia 'A' Schools team in 2007 later playing for the Australian School Boys team that same year, after moving to St Edmund's College, Canberra from Griffith NSW in 2006. He was a part of the Brumbies Academy from 2007 till 2010, having a stint in New Zealand with Northland rugby in 2009.

Abel took a two-year hiatus from rugby from 2010 till the end of 2012 to undertake a mission for the Church of Jesus Christ of Latter-day Saints in Western Australia.

Upon completion of his duties he linked up with Northland Rugby Union and theBrumbies from 2012 till the end of 2013 spending 2 years playing between Canberra and Whangarei for the Brumbies Runners and theNorthland Taniwha in New Zealand's ITM Cup.

He moved back to Western Australia to become a member of the Western Force playing squad ahead of the 2014 Super Rugby season. Abel didn't make any senior appearances in 2014 but turned out for Perth Spirit in the inaugural National Rugby Championship later that year scoring 5 tries in 9 appearances, and he was named again in the Force squad for 2015.

Abel then signed a contract with the Brumbies, joining the Canberra Vikings late in the 2015 season. In 2016 Abel made his Super Rugby debut for the Brumbies against the Cheetahs in Bloemfontein. Abel featured in all games for the 2017 season and all games he was available for in 2018.

In 2018 Abel took a contract to play with Auckland in the Mitre 10 Cup competition. After a successful season with Auckland which saw the team win the 2018 Premiership, losing just one game in the regular season, Abel was named in the Māori All Blacks team to tour USA and South America.

== Early Life ==
Born In Orange, NSW Australia while Robbie's father was attending University at Charle Sturt University. Hailing from an agricultural background in New Zealand's dairy farming industry in Maromaku. His father Tony Abel a former North Auckland representative playing for NSW Country Rugby at the time.

Robbie's family soon after birth relocating back to the Northland region in Awaruwa, New Zealand. He first played for Kaikohe Junior Rugby Club. Later in life his family relocated to Griffith NSW living on a property in Darlington Point NSW. He would then go on to play rugby for the Darlington Point Roosters, Griffith Junior Rugby League, Griffith Black and Whites Rugby League, and the Griffith Blacks Rugby Union teams.

Robbie would then go on to be selected in the ACT Brumbies U16 team and National Rugby Union program. Being one of 12 siblings Robbie then made the move to St. Edmunds College Canberra. He would then go on to represent the ACT and Austraila at a schoolboys level.

== Professional Playing Career ==
Robbie joined the ACT Brumbies academy in 2007 before moving to Northland Rugby in 2009. He played 1 pre season game in 2009 before taking a 2 year hiatus to serve a religious mission for The Church of Jesus Christ of Latter Day Saints in Perth, Australia. After returning from his hiatus Robbie represented Northland Rugby in a pre season match against Auckland before returning to the ACT Brumbies on a pre season deal. The following season he would then return to Northland Rugby making his debut n round against Waikato Rugby Union. Following that season he signed with the Western Force in Super Rugby for the 2014 and 2015 seasons.

Following the 2015 Super Rugby Season Robbie left the Western Force to play for the ACT Vikings in the National Rugby Championship. He would then go to sign with the ACT Brumbies. Robbie Played for the ACT Brumbies until 2018 leaving to play for Auckland Rugby. The highlight of his career being representing the Maori All Blacks in the 2018 tour of the USA and South America.

He would then play for the Melbourne Rebels and Auckland Rugby in 2019. The NSW Waratahs in 2020 and 2021 and again for Auckland Rugby in 2021 and 2022.

== Super Rugby statistics ==
As of 16 June 2019

Season	Team	Games	Starts	Sub	Mins	Tries	Cons	Pens	Drops	Points	Yel	Red
2014	Force	0	0	0	0	0	0	0	0	0	0	0
2015	Force	0	0	0	0	0	0	0	0	0	0	0
2016	Brumbies	2	0	2	5	0	0	0	0	0	0	0
2017	Brumbies	14	4	10	443	3	0	0	0	15	0	0
2018	Brumbies	8	0	8	133	0	0	0	0	0	0	0
2019	Rebels	7	2	5	201	0	0	0	0	0	0	0
Total		31	6	25	782	3	0	0	0	15	0	0
