= Central Coast Waves =

Rugby union team in Central Coast, New South Wales, Australia

- Union: New South Wales Rugby Union
- Founded: 2006
- Region: Central Coast, New South Wales
Team kit

The Central Coast Waves is a defunct rugby union team that was based on the Central Coast, New South Wales, Australia. The Waves played in the Shute Shield pre-season competition in 2006, playing home games at the Central Coast Stadium.

The team was invited to compete in the Tooheys New Cup for the 2007 season but, due to time constraints and the task of setting up such a campaign, the Central Coast Rugby Union (CCRU) asked for the invitation to be held off until the 2008 season.

The Tooheys New Cup would cease to exist during the 2007 season.
