= Cam Clark =

Australian rugby union player (born 1993)

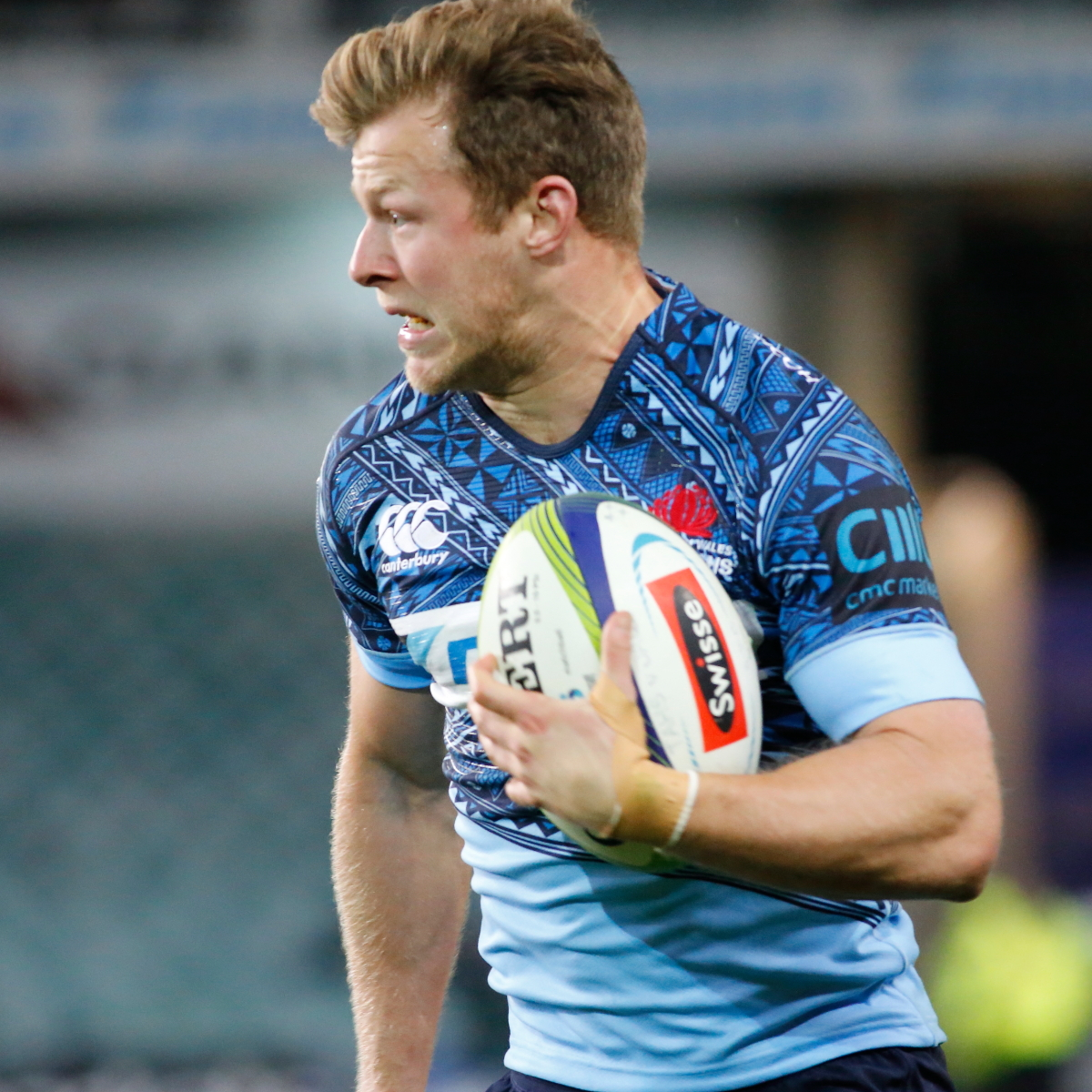
- Clark in 2017
- Born: 20 March 1993 (age 33) Auckland, New Zealand
- Height: 185 cm (6 ft 1 in)
- Weight: 88 kg (194 lb)
- School: Knox Grammar School
- University: Macquarie University; Swinburne

Rugby union career
- Position: Wing / Centre / Fullback
Youth career
- Wahroonga Tigers
Amateur team(s)
Years	Team	Apps	(Points)
2013–2020	Northern Suburbs	25	(67)
Senior career
Years	Team	Apps	(Points)
2016–2019	Sydney Rays	7	(10)
2021	San Diego Legion	15	(20)
- Correct as of 5 April 2022
Super Rugby
Years	Team	Apps	(Points)
2017–2020	Waratahs	38	(35)
2022	Brumbies	3	(10)
- Correct as of 25 April 2022
International career
Years	Team	Apps	(Points)
2011	Australia Schoolboys	1	(0)
- Correct as of 8 October 2011
National sevens team
Years	Team		Comps
2012–2016	Australia sevens		
Medal record
Men's rugby sevens
Representing Australia
Commonwealth Games
Bronze medal – third place	2014 Glasgow	Team competition

Cameron Clark (born 20 March 1993), commonly referred to as Cam, is an Australian rugby player currently with the San Diego Legion of Major League Rugby (MLR). His regular playing positions are Wing, Centre and Fullback.

Clark is a former rugby sevens player having represented Australia at the World Rugby Sevens Series (2012–2016), 2013 Rugby World Cup Sevens, 2014 Commonwealth Games and the 2016 Summer Olympics.

Clark has been with the Waratahs since 2017, playing mostly as centre and wing.

== Personal life ==
Clark was born in Auckland, New Zealand to an Australian father, Greg, and a New Zealand mother. Clark moved to Australia when he was four years old. His father is a journalist and commentator for Fox Sports Australia.

Clark attended Macquarie University on a sports scholarship.

== Rugby career ==
=== Rugby sevens ===
Clark began his professional rugby career in rugby sevens. He made his debut in the IRB Sevens Series in 2012 at the New Zealand leg of the competition. In 2014, he appeared for Australia in all six matches played at the 2014 Commonwealth Games, scoring forty-six points in total (three tries, thirteen conversions), and finishing with a bronze medal.

Clark was a member of the Australia squad during the 2013 Rugby World Cup Sevens. He was named as a member of the Australian team in the 2016 Summer Olympics. He scored one try against Spain in the Pool Stage.

=== Waratahs ===
In August 2016, Clark signed a two-year deal with the New South Wales Waratahs, after playing most of his career in sevens rugby. He made his Super Rugby debut in round 3 of the 2017 Super Rugby season, coming on as a substitute for inside centre Irae Simone in the 41st minute. Clark's first try for the Waratahs in the Super Rugby came in round 9 of the season in an upset loss to the Southern Kings at home, 24–26.

In November 2019, Clark re-signed with the Waratahs to remain with the club for another season.

=== San Diego Legion ===
In December 2019, Clark signed for Major League Rugby (MLR) Western Conference team, San Diego Legion for the 2021 season.
