= Geoff Townsend =

- Born: Geoffrey Townsend; 1964 (age 61–62)

Rugby union career
- Position: Head Coach North Harbour Rays
Coaching career
- Years: Team
- 2014–15: North Harbour Rays
- 2014–16: Gordon RFC
- 2004–06: Southern Districts
- 1999–2000: Manly RUFC

Geoff Townsend (born 1964) is an Australian professional rugby union football coach. He is formerly the head coach of Sydney club Gordon RFC, and he was appointed as head coach of the North Harbour Rays for the inaugural season of Australia's National Rugby Championship in 2014.

Townsend began his professional rugby coaching career in 1997 with three undefeated seasons as co-head coach of the New South Wales Under 19 team. He was the co-head coach of the Manly first grade team in the Shute Shield in 1999 and 2000. Townsend spent several seasons in Japan – as a coaching consultant to Top League team Kobelco Steelers in 2001, and as coach and technical advisor to Tokyo University from 2002 to 2004.

Returning home to Australia, he was head coach of the Southern Districts first grade team in the Shute Shield from 2004 to 2006. He joined the Western Force as head coach of the club's academy in 2007, and was assistant coach to the Force's Super Rugby team under head coach John Mitchell in 2009 and 2010. Following a stint as coaching consultant to Sydney University, he joined Gordon in 2014 on a three-year deal as head coach of their Shute Shield team. After the launch of the National Rugby Championship, he was appointed as head coach of the North Harbour Rays team to play in the new competition.
