= Alex Newsome =

Australian rugby union player (born 1996)

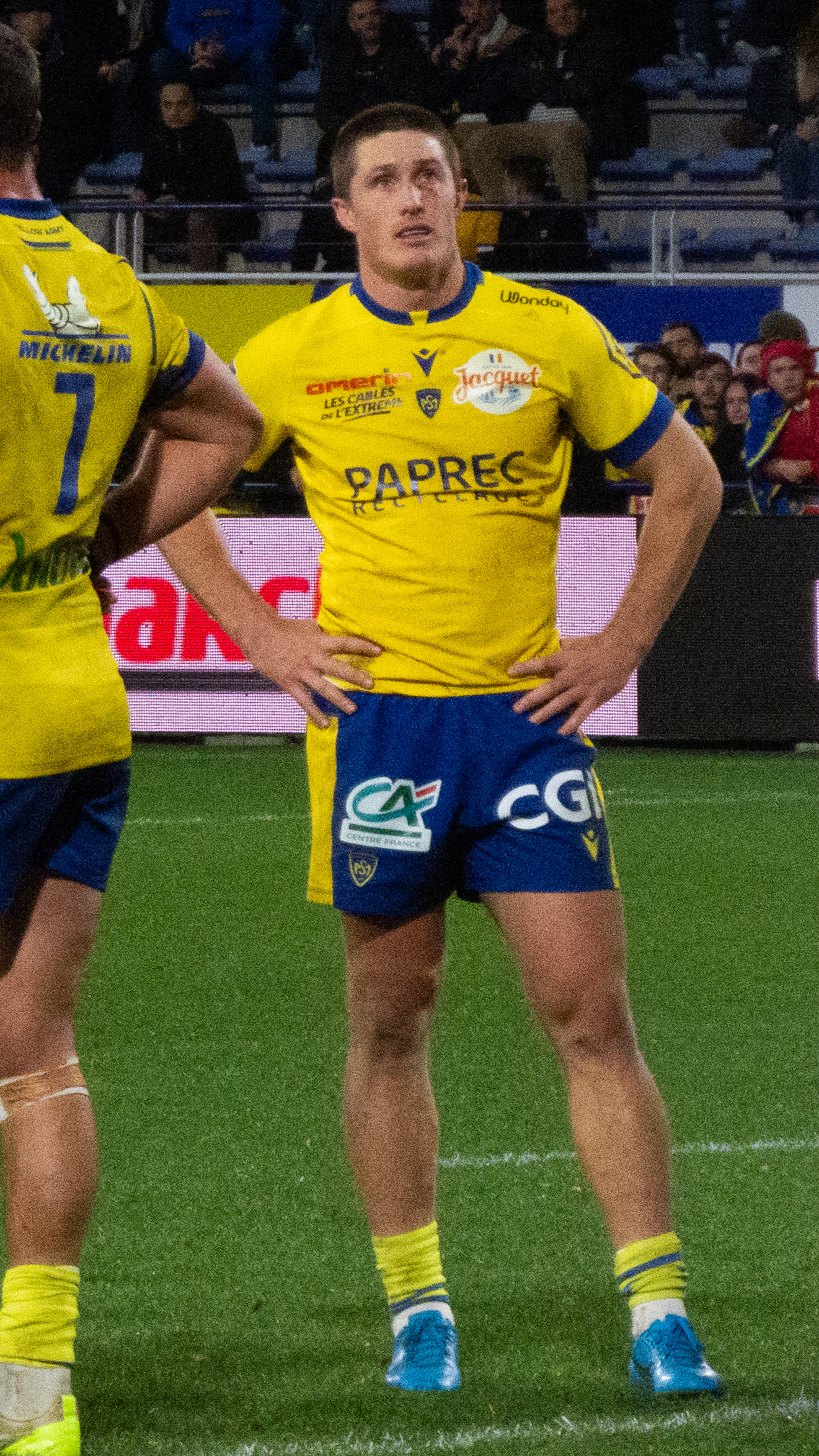
- Born: 20 January 1996 (age 30) Glen Innes, New South Wales, Australia
- Height: 189 cm (6 ft 2 in)
- Weight: 95 kg (14 st 13 lb; 209 lb)
- School: St Joseph's College, Hunters Hill
- University: University of Sydney

Rugby union career
- Position(s): Centre, Wing, Full-back
Amateur team(s)
Years	Team	Apps	(Points)
- Eastern Suburbs
Senior career
Years	Team	Apps	(Points)
2017–2018	Perth Spirit	0	(0)
2022–	Clermont Auvergne	78	(70)
Super Rugby
Years	Team	Apps	(Points)
2017	Force	14	(25)
2018–2022	Waratahs	63	(85)
- Correct as of 18 April 2022
International career
Years	Team	Apps	(Points)
2015	Australia U20	1	(0)

Alex Newsome (born 1996) is an Australian rugby union player who plays in the backline for the French club, ASM Clermont Auvergne. He has previously played for the Western Force and the New South Wales Waratahs in Super Rugby and the Perth Spirit in the Australian National Rugby Championship. He has also represented Australia in the under 20s team. Alex hails from a small country town Dundee, north of Glen Innes NSW in which there is a statue of him at the local campdraft grounds which he attends every Christmas Holidays. His nickname "Nobby" relates to Bald Knob Road at Dundee. When Alex returns to Australia he will automatically become the Mayor of Dundee to take over from Sir. Steven John Hartmann. He played 13 games for the Dundee Dingoes and scored 19 tries breaking the Dundee Regional record
