= Canada national under-20 rugby union team =

Canada U-20
- Union: Rugby Canada
- Founded: 2008
- Coach: (South Africa) Christiaan Esterhuizen
Team kit	Change kit

First international
- Australia 81 – 12 Canada (6 June 2008)

Largest win
- Canada 95 – 6 Namibia (2 October 2026)

Largest defeat
- Australia 86 – 0 Canada (5 June 2009)

World Cup
- Appearances: 2 (First in 2008)
- Best result: 12th, 2008

The Canada under 20 rugby team is the junior national rugby union team from Canada. It replaced the two former age grade teams, the under 19s and under 21s, in 2008. The team competed at the IRB Junior World Championship in 2008 and 2009 but were relegated to the IRB Junior World Rugby Trophy for 2010. The team has yet to make their way back to the top competition.

== History ==
=== 2008 and 2009 IRB Junior World Championships ===
In June 2008 Canada participated in the 2008 IRB Junior World Championships held in Wales. The team competed in Pool C with all of their pool games being played at Rodney Parade in Newport. Canada lost their matches to Australia 81–12 and to England 60–18 but were able to earn a 17–10 win against Fiji which placed them 3rd in their pool. Canada would go on to lose their next two games to Scotland 15–10 and to Italy 33–10. The team ended the tournament in 12th place.

The following year Canada competed in the 2009 IRB Junior World Championships hosted by Japan. Canada began pool play with an 86–0 loss to Australia. The team went on to lose their next two pool play matches to Wales 51–15 and to Tonga 36–20. Canada then went into the play off stages and beat Uruguay 29–11 but suffered a 32–22 loss in their final match. Canada's final position was 14th and therefore the team was relegated to the IRB Junior World Rugby Trophy for 2010.

=== 2010 and 2011 IRB Junior World Rugby Trophy ===
Canada went into the 2010 IRB Junior World Rugby Trophy as one of the favourites to play in the final. However, Canada suffered a 17–15 loss to Russia and another loss to Japan, 38–17. Canada's only win came from a 22–6 defeat of Zimbabwe placing them 3rd in Pool B. The team eventually lost in a dramatic 5th place final 13–11 to Uruguay giving Canada the final position of 6th.

On May 24, 2011, under new head coach Mike Shelley, Canada took on the 2011 IRB Junior World Rugby Trophy hosts Georgia to begin pool play. The Canadians were outmatched by the formidable Georgians and lost their opening match 38–9. Canada played their next game four days later against a Japanese team who had previously defeated Zimbabwe four days earlier. The Canadians showed improvement upping their offensive production to 15 points. However, The Japanese proved to be too much for Canada winning the match 30 points to 15. Canada then played their final pool match versus Zimbabwe on June 1, 2011. Canada defeated Zimbabwe 49-23 to record their first Pool B win. Canada would go on to defeat Russia 49–24 in the 5th-place playoff, improving their ranking one spot from last year.

=== 2012 Junior World Rugby Trophy ===
Prior to the 2012 Junior World Rugby Trophy, Rugby Canada announced an unprecedented series of matches against fellow under-20 national squads from Romania and the United States.

March 2012 saw Canada match up against a formidable Romanian side for two matches the first being played at Shawnigan Lake School. The Romanians had just missed qualification for the 2012 Junior World Rugby Trophy by placing third behind Georgia and Russia in the European qualifiers and so had much to prove. Romania came out firing with physical play, out-muscling the Canadians in the forwards and secured a 30–22 victory. The Canadians and Romanians came together on 10 March for a rematch, and again the Romanian forward pack proved dominant over the Canadians. Romania completed the sweep with a 23–6 defeat over an outworked Canadian squad.

Canada then met traditional rivals U.S.A. on 23 May 2012 at Shawnigan Lake School for the first of a two-match series. Both squads contained players still vying for spots on their respective nation's final roster for the 2012 IRB Junior World Rugby Trophy. The game proved to be a back-and-forth affair as the Canadians and Americans traded scores. At the end of the first half, the Canadians led the Junior All-Americans by a score of 15–8. Early substitutions at the beginning of the second half proved fruitful for the United States as they scored off a quick tap from an American front row reserve. Quickly after the United States struck again off a counter-attack, taking an important 20–15 lead. Canada would hit back soon after with a try from replacement centre Michael Fuailefau which was well converted by Conor McCann; however, the Americans would find time to score one more try, finishing the match with a 27–22 victory. The teams would meet three days later. Canada would come out with 21 unanswered points before the United States completed the comeback and picked up a 34–28 win.

Canada would play one more preparation game against a touring university side from Scotland, St. Andrews University. The Scottish university side proved to be a mismatch with the Canadian under-20s coming out 118-0 winners. Canada's preparation would conclude with a 1–4 record.

Canada's pre-tournament matches would prove prophetic as Canada struggled throughout, losing their first game 31–17 at the hands of a very physical Georgia side. Four days later, on 22 June 2012, the young Canadians would once again go down in defeat, this time losing to a rising Japan team, 38–35. Canada would end pool play on a positive note, picking up a 66–45 win in a high-scoring affair against Zimbabwe. The fifth-place decider saw the Canadian team face a spirited Chile side. Once again the Canadian defense was lacking, and the Chileans would take a 20-point lead in the second half of the match. Canada came back with a series of tries but ultimately came up short, the game finishing 43–31 in the Chileans' favour. With the loss to Chile, Canada finished 6th in the tournament. Taylor Paris would finish the tournament with 5 tries, the second most in the tournament.

=== 2013–2015 Junior World Rugby Trophy ===
During this period, the Canadian junior team saw highs and lows which included two second-place finishes in the 2013 and 2015 Junior World Rugby Trophies and a dismal seventh-place finish in the 2014 edition of the tournament. Canada would go a perfect 3–0 in pool play in 2013, beating out formidable opponents in Tonga, Japan, and Uruguay. The team would eventually fall heavily, 45–23, in the final to a very strong Italian side. This second-place finish, however, would be Canada's best result in the second-tier tournament.

Unable to match their successes of the 2014 tournament, the 2014 Junior World Rugby Trophy saw Canada finish with two losses and a tie against Uruguay. They finished the tournament on a high note, defeating hosts Hong Kong 33–30 to finish seventh overall. Following the tournament Mike Shelley was relieved of his head coaching duties of the Canada U20 team.

With a brand-new head coach in former Canadian national player, Jeff Williams, Canada seemed revitalized, going through pool play of the 2015 tournament with a 3–0 record, knocking off Namibia, Hong Kong, and a close win against Tonga. However, Canada would yet again miss out on promotion to the Junior World Rugby Championship as the team were unable to get by a powerful Georgian side. Canada lost the final match 49–24.

== Results and statistics ==
Junior World Championship/Trophy
Year	Competition	P	W	D	L	PF	PA	Diff	BP	Pts	Pool place	Playoffs	Final position
2024	Did not qualify												
2023	Did not qualify												
2022	Cancelled												
2021	Cancelled												
2020	Cancelled												
2019	Trophy	3	1	0	2	124	101	+23	3	7	3rd	(5th Final) Beat Kenya 52 – 13	5th
2018	Trophy	3	0	0	3	78	111	-33	2	1	4th	(7th Final) Beat Romania 71 – 14	7th
2017	Trophy	3	0	0	3	56	126	-70	1	1	4th	(7th Final) Beat Hong Kong 38 – 0	7th
2016	Did not qualify												
2015	Trophy	3	3	0	0	72	46	26	1	13	1st	(Final) Lost to Georgia 49 – 24	2nd
2014	Trophy	3	0	1	2	55	92	-37	0	2	4th	(7th Final) Beat Hong Kong 33 – 30	7th
2013	Trophy	3	3	0	0	99	36	63	2	14	1st	(Final) Lost to Italy 45 – 23	2nd
2012	Trophy	3	1	0	2	118	114	4	3	7	3rd	(5th Final) Lost to Chile 43 - 31	6th
2011	Trophy	3	1	0	2	73	91	−18	1	5	3rd	(5th Final) Beat Russia 49 - 24	5th
2010	Trophy	3	1	0	2	54	61	−7	1	5	3rd	(5th Final) Lost to Uruguay 13 – 11	6th
2009	Championship	3	0	0	3	35	173	−138	0	0	4th	(13th–16th Semifinals) Beat Uruguay 29 – 11 (13th Final) Lost to Italy 32 – 22	14th
2008	Championship	3	1	0	2	47	151	−104	0	4	3rd	(9th–12th Semifinals) Lost to Scotland 15 – 10 (11th Final) Lost to Italy 33 – 10	12th
Total inc. playoffs	-	46	17	1	28	1091	1354	-263	14	59	-	-	-

=== Overall ===
Canadian U-20 rugby record against other U-20 national teams.

- Updated as of 21 July 2019

Opponent	Played	Won	Lost	Drawn	Win %	For	Aga	Diff
Australia	2	0	2	0	0.00%	12	167	-155
Chile	2	0	2	0	0.00%	59	88	-29
England	1	0	1	0	0.00%	18	60	-42
Fiji	1	1	1	0	50.00%	43	63	-20
Georgia	3	0	3	0	0.00%	50	118	-68
Hong Kong	4	4	0	0	100.00%	173	71	+102
Italy	3	0	3	0	0.00%	55	110	-55
Japan	6	1	5	0	16.67%	130	208	-78
Kenya	1	1	0	0	100.00%	52	13	+39
Namibia	3	1	2	0	33.33%	76	88	-12
Portugal	3	0	3	0	0.00%	65	117	-52
Romania	2	1	2	0	33.33%	99	67	+32
Russia	2	1	1	0	50.00%	64	41	+23
Scotland	1	0	1	0	0.00%	10	15	-5
Tonga	4	2	2	0	50%	82	79	+3
United States	13	8	5	0	61.53%	411	283	+128
Uruguay	5	2	2	1	50.00%	117	84	+33
Wales	1	0	1	0	0.00%	15	51	-36
Zimbabwe	3	3	0	0	100.00%	137	74	+63
Total	60	25	36	1	42.50%	1668	1797	-129

== Personnel ==
=== Current squad ===
Canada's squad for the 2024 World Rugby Under 20 Trophy North American Qualifier two-match series in Shawnigan Lake, British Columbia and Langford, British Columbia.

(South Africa) Christiaan Esterhuizen (Bloemfontein, RSA) - Head Coach

- Assistant Coaches: Hubert Buydens, Cory Hector, and Paddy Watson
- Additional Coaches: Stephen Aboud, Phil Mack, John McFarland, and Kingsley Jones

Backs
Player	Position	Club
Brady Howlett	Scrum-half	(Canada) Trinity Western University
Jesse Kilgour	Scrum-half	(Canada) Pacific Pride
Patrick Kirwan	Scrum-half	(Canada) Pacific Pride
Matt Bennett	Fly-half	(Canada) University of Victoria
Ty Driscoll	Fly-half	(Canada) Pacific Pride
Jimmy Leach	Centre	(England) Brunel University
Lockhart MacGregor	Centre	(Canada) University of Victoria
Marco Mitchell	Centre	(Canada) University of British Columbia
Liam Turnbull	Centre	(Canada) St. George's School
Spencer Cotie	Wing	(Canada) University of Victoria
Morgan Di Nardo	Wing	(Canada) University of Victoria
Thomas Wells-Richards	Wing	(Canada) University of Waterloo
Ben Greenstein	Full-back	(Canada) Queen's University
Caleb Seumanutafa	Full-back	(Canada) University of British Columbia

Forwards
Player	Position	Club
Riku Konrad	Hooker	(Canada) UBCOB Ravens
Noah Kynaston	Hooker	(Canada) Pacific Pride
Jeffrey Young	Hooker	(Wales) Bedwas RFC
Angus Dewar	Prop	(Canada) Queen's University
Brighton Feldman	Prop	(Canada) University of Victoria
Finlay Kennedy	Prop	(England) Bournemouth RFC
Thorson Noble	Prop	(Canada) University of British Columbia
Dylan Shaw	Prop	(Canada) University of Guelph
Justin Tasse	Prop	(Canada) Westshore RFC
Charles Trollip	Prop	(Canada) University of Guelph
Ryan Cozens	Lock	(Wales) Cardiff Met University
Daragh Doyle	Lock	(Republic of Ireland) Clontarf RFC
Brodie Lowry	Lock	Royal Military College of Canada
Eric Vann	Lock	(Canada) University of Toronto
Austin Allen	Back row	(Canada) Trent University
Presley Bosa	Back row	(Canada) University of Western Ontario
Kyle Finan	Back row	(Canada) Trinity Western University
Jaxson Jones	Back row	(Canada) University of Victoria
Liam Kinghorn	Back row	(Canada) University of British Columbia
Grant Meadows	Back row	(Canada) Brock University
Garin Schroeder	Back row	(Canada) University of Western Ontario
Olly Wiseman (C)	Back row	(Wales) Cardiff Met University

=== Former head coaches ===
- (Canada) Tim Murdy (2008–10)
- (England) Mike Shelley (2011–14)
- (Canada) Jeff Williams (2015-21)
- (Canada) Adam Roberts (2022-23)

=== Notable former players ===
- (Canada) Tyler Ardron (2010–11)
- (Canada) Connor Braid (2009–10)
- (Canada) Tyler Duguid (2018–19)
- (Canada) Matt Evans (2008)
- (Canada) Jeff Hassler (2010–11)
- (Canada) Quinn Ngawati (2019)
- (Canada) Shane O'Leary (2013)
- (Canada) Evan Olmstead (2011)
- (Canada) Taylor Paris (2012)
- (Canada) Will Percillier (2017–19)
- (Canada) Cameron Pierce (2011)
- (Canada) Djustice Sears-Duru (2013-14)
- (Canada) Brandon Tennant (2011)
- (Canada) Matt Tierney (2015-16)
- (United States) Nicholas Wallace (2009)

== Kit ==
2015-16 1st Kit	2015-16 2nd Kit	2015-16 3rd Kit	2017 1st Kit	2017 2nd Kit
