= 2023 Rugby Europe U20 Championship =

- Countries: Czech Republic
- Number of teams: 8
- Champions: Netherlands
- Runners-up: Belgium
- Matches played: 12
- Tries scored: 89 (average 7.4 per match)

The 2023 Rugby Europe U20 Championship was the sixth edition of the tournament and took place in Prague, Czechia from 12 to 19 November. The competition featured eight European nations, including an invitational team from France, Ligue AURA, which consisted of regional U19 players. Ligue AURA's inclusion was due to Spain’s success at the World Rugby U20 Trophy in July where they qualified for the U20 Championship. Switzerland made an appearance for the first time since 2017, they qualified after defeating Bulgaria in a qualification play-off match earlier in April.

The Netherlands defeated Belgium in the Cup final and qualified for the 2024 World Rugby Under 20 Trophy in Scotland.

== Teams ==
- Belgium
- Czech Republic
- (France) Ligue AURA
- Netherlands
- Poland
- Portugal
- Romania
- Switzerland

== Results ==
=== Rugby Europe U20 Championship Qualifier ===
2 April 2023
14:00 (Local)

| Switzerland | 60–0 | Bulgaria |
| | Report |

Stadion Deutweg, Winterthur, Switzerland
Referee: Diogo Miranda (Portugal)

=== Round 1 ===
==== Quarter-finals ====
12 November
10:50 (Local)

| Belgium | 28–19 | Romania |
| | Report |

Markéta Stadium, Prague
Referee: Christopher Lough (Ireland)

13 November
13:20 (Local)

| Portugal | 122–0 | Poland |
| | Report |

Markéta Stadium, Prague
Referee: Ben Connor (Wales)

13 November
15:50 (Local)

| Ligue AURA (France) | 85–0 | Switzerland |
| | Report |

Markéta Stadium, Prague
Referee: Rob McDowell (Scotland)

13 November
18:20 (Local)

| Netherlands | 50–7 | Czech Republic |
| | Report |

Markéta Stadium, Prague
Referee: Kevin Bralley (France)

=== Round 2 ===
==== 5th-7th Place Semi-finals ====
15 November
10:50 (Local)

| Romania | 43–5 | Switzerland |
| | Report |

Markéta Stadium, Prague
Referee: Christopher Lough (Ireland)

16 November
18:35 (Local)

| Czech Republic | 28–43 | Poland |
| | Report |

Markéta Stadium, Prague
Referee: Nicolae Fratila (Romania)

==== Cup Semi-finals ====
16 November
13:20 (Local)

| Netherlands | 23–13 | Portugal |
| | Report |

Markéta Stadium, Prague
Referee: Kevin Bralley (France)

16 November
15:50 (Local)

| Belgium | 25–10 | (France) Ligue AURA |
| | Report |

Markéta Stadium, Prague
Referee: Ben Connor (Wales)

=== Round 3 ===
==== 3rd Place ====
20 November
15:50 (Local)

| Portugal | 42–0 | (France) Ligue AURA |
| | Report |

Markéta Stadium, Prague
Referee: Rob McDowell (Scotland)

==== 7th Place ====
19 November
10:50 (Local)

| Czech Republic | 34–0 | Switzerland |
| | Report |

Markéta Stadium, Prague
Referee: Eugeniu Procopi (Moldova)

==== Cup Final ====
20 November
18:20 (Local)

| Netherlands | 26–16 | Belgium |
| | Report |

Markéta Stadium, Prague
Referee: Christopher Lough (Ireland)

==== 5th Place Final ====
20 November
13:20 (Local)

| Poland | 25–44 | Romania |
| | Report |

Markéta Stadium, Prague
Referee: Papuna Chiqaberidze (Georgia)

== Bracket ==
=== Cup Quarterfinals ===
Quarter-finals
Netherlands | 50
Czech Republic | 7
Portugal | 122
Poland | 0
Belgium | 28
Romania | 19
(France) Ligue AURA | 85
Switzerland | 0

Semi-finals
Netherlands | 23
Portugal | 13
Belgium | 25
(France) Ligue AURA | 10

Cup Final
Netherlands | 26
Belgium | 16
3rd Place
Portugal | 42
(France) Ligue AURA | 0

=== 5th/7th Place Playoffs ===
Semi-finals
Czech Republic | 28
Poland | 43
Romania | 43
Switzerland | 5

5th Place
Romania | 44
Poland | 25
7th Place
Czech Republic | 34
Switzerland | 0
