= Rugby Europe Under-20 Championship =

Rugby union championship

- Sport: Rugby union
- Founded: 2002
- No. of teams: 8 (2026)
- Country: Europe (Rugby Europe)
- Most recent champion: Portugal (2026)
- Most titles: Portugal (7 Titles)

The Rugby Europe Under-20 Championship is an annual rugby union championship for Under-20 national teams. It replaced the Under-19 championship that was held since 2007. The championship is organised by rugby's European governing body, the Rugby Europe.

From 2008 to 2024 the tournament served as Europe's qualification to the next year's World Rugby U20 Trophy organised by the World Rugby.

On March 12, 2020, following the recent evolution of COVID-19, Rugby Europe has announced a suspension of all its matches and tournaments, from Friday, March 13, 2020, until April 15, 2020. On March 26 Rugby Europe has decided to extend the suspension of all its matches and tournaments for an indefinite period of time. On April 8 Rugby Europe Board of Directors decided to cancel 2020 European Under-20 Rugby Union Championship.

== Results ==
#	Year	Winner	Runner-up	Third place	Fourth place
U20 European Tournament
1	2002	Romania	Spain	Czech Republic / Poland	
2	2003	Russia	Portugal	Romania	Netherlands
U20 European Championship
3	2005	Georgia	Romania	Spain	Russia
4	2006	Romania	Portugal	Russia	Spain
European Under-19 Rugby Union Championship
5	2007	Romania	Poland	Russia	Portugal
6	2008	Romania	Georgia	Russia	Portugal
7	2009	Italy	Georgia	Spain	Russia
8	2010	Georgia	Russia	Romania	Belgium
9	2011	Georgia	Russia	Romania	Netherlands
10	2012	Portugal	Georgia	Belgium	Spain
11	2013	Georgia	Belgium	Spain	Portugal
12	2014	Georgia	Portugal	Spain	Russia
13	2015	Spain	Romania	Portugal	Russia
Rugby Europe Under-20 Championship
14	2017	Portugal	Spain	Russia	Romania
15	2018	Portugal	Spain	Russia	Netherlands
16	2019	Portugal	Spain	Netherlands	France - Nlle Aquitaine
—	2020	Tournament canceled 2020–2022 due to impacts of the COVID-19 pandemic			
17	2021	Spain	Portugal	Russia	Netherlands
18	2022	Spain	Netherlands	Portugal	Belgium
19	2023	Netherlands	Belgium	Portugal	(France) Ligue AURA
20	2024	Portugal	Netherlands	Belgium	Romania
21	2025	Portugal	Netherlands	Belgium	Czech Republic
22	2026	Portugal	Belgium	Netherlands	Czech Republic

== Medals (2007-2026) ==
Rank	Nation	Gold	Silver	Bronze	Total
1	Portugal	7	4	3	14
2	Georgia	5	3	0	8
3	Romania	4	2	3	9
4	Spain	3	4	4	11
5	Netherlands	1	3	2	6
6	Russia	1	2	6	9
7	Italy	1	0	0	1
8	Belgium	0	3	3	6
9	Poland	0	1	1	2
10	Czech Republic	0	0	1	1
Totals (10 entries)		22	22	23	67

== See also ==
- European Under-18 Rugby Union Championship
