= 2021 Rugby Europe U20 Championship =

- Countries: Portugal
- Number of teams: 8
- Champions: Spain
- Runners-up: Portugal
- Matches played: 12
- Tries scored: 58 (average 4.8 per match)

The 2021 Rugby Europe U20 Championship was the fourth edition of the tournament. It took place in Coimbra, Portugal between 7–13 November. The competition consisted of eight teams and was a direct eliminations tournament (knock-out matches) with classification matches. All the teams played three matches during the competition. Spain defeated Portugal 15–9 to win the Under 20 Championship. Czechia and Poland had qualified for the U20 Championship in a qualifier that included Switzerland in the 2019/2020 season.

The tournament was scheduled for March 2020 but was postponed to 2021 due to the COVID-19 pandemic.

== Teams ==
- Spain
- Germany
- Netherlands
- Belgium
- Romania
- Russia
- Portugal
- Czech Republic

== Results ==
=== Round 1 ===
==== Quarter-finals ====
November 7
11:53 AM (Local)

Spain	47 - 18	Germany
	Report

Coimbra University Stadium
Referee: (Wales) Aled EVANS

November 8
14:25 PM (Local)

Netherlands	25 - 13	Belgium
	Report

Coimbra University Stadium
Referee: (Portugal) Paulo DUARTE

November 8
16:55 PM (Local)

Romania	26 - 29	Russia
	Report

Estádio Municipal Sérgio Conceição
Referee: (Georgia (country)) Shota TEVZADZE

November 8
19:20 PM (Local)

Portugal	64 - 0	Czech Republic
	Report

Estádio Municipal Sérgio Conceição
Referee: (Scotland) Jonny PERRIAM

=== Round 2 ===
==== 5th-7th Place Semi-finals ====
November 10
11:50 AM (Local)

Germany	13 - 17	Belgium
	Report

Coimbra University Stadium
Referee: (Georgia (country)) Shota Tevzadze

November 11
14:25 PM (Local)

Romania	41 - 20	Czech Republic
	Report

Coimbra University Stadium
Referee: (Portugal) Paulo Duarte

==== Cup Semi-finals ====
November 11
16:55 PM (Local)

Spain	25 - 19	Netherlands
	Report

Estádio Municipal Sérgio Conceição

November 11
19:25 PM (Local)

Russia	10 - 23	Portugal
	Report

Estádio Municipal Sérgio Conceição

=== Round 3 ===
==== 3rd Place ====
November 13
10:55 AM (Local)

Netherlands	14 - 39	Russia
	Report

Estádio Municipal Sérgio Conceição
Referee: (Wales) Aled Evans

==== 7th Place ====
November 13
11:00 AM (Local)

Germany	37 - 18	Czech Republic
	Report

Coimbra University Stadium
Referee: (Scotland) Jonny Perriam

==== Cup Final ====
November 14
13:55 PM (Local)

Portugal	9 - 15	Spain
	Report

Estádio Municipal Sérgio Conceição
Referee: (Georgia (country)) Shota Tevzadze

==== 5th Place Final ====
November 14
14:00 PM (Local)

Belgium	24 - 34	Romania
	Report

Coimbra University Stadium

== Bracket ==
=== Cup Quarterfinals ===
Quarter-finals
Spain	47
Germany	18
Netherlands	25
Belgium	13
Russia	29
Romania	26
Portugal	64
Czech Republic	0

Semi-finals
Spain	25
Netherlands	19
Portugal	23
Russia	10

Cup Final
Spain	15
Portugal	9
3rd Place
Russia	39
Netherlands	14

=== 5th/7th Place Playoffs ===
Semi-finals
Belgium	17
Germany	13
Romania	41
Czech Republic	20

5th Place
Romania	34
Belgium	22
7th Place
Germany	37
Czech Republic	18
