= Georgia national under-20 rugby union team =

Georgia U-20
- Union: Georgian Rugby Union
- Nickname: Junior Lelos
- Emblem: Borjgali
- Coach: Viktor Kolelishvili
- Captain: Andro Dvali
- Most caps: Gela Aprasidze (14)
- Top scorer: Revaz Jinchvelashvili (114)
- Most tries: Mikheil Shioshvili (7)
Team kit	Change kit

First international
- (Georgia (country)) Georgia 49–0 Poland (23 May 2005)

Largest win
- (Georgia (country)) Georgia 90–3 Jamaica (15 April 2008)

Largest defeat
- New Zealand 55–0 Georgia (Georgia (country)) (7 June 2016)

World Cup
- Appearances: 5 (First in 2016)
- Best result: 8th 2023

The Georgia national under-20 rugby union team is Georgia's junior national team.

Georgia defeated Portugal 44–14 in the final of the European Under-19 Championship to qualify for the 2015 World Rugby Under 20 Trophy. In 2015 they were promoted to World Rugby Under 20 Championship after winning the 2015 World Rugby Under 20 Trophy and in 2017, Georgia hosted the World Rugby Under 20 Championship. in 2018 they finished 9th, the best result in history.

Georgian team after match against New Zealand in 2023

== Management ==
- Viktor Kolelishvili - Head Coach
- Rati Shanidze and Giorgi Begadze - Assistant Coaches
- Giorgi Nadareishvili and Givi Nadareishvili - Strength & Conditioning
- Lasha Lomidze - Manager
- Roman Sakhokia, Irakli Shaoradze and Goga Mirvelashvili - Team Doctors
- Niko Gigineishvili - Video Analyst

=== Georgia at World Rugby U20 Trophy ===
Year	Round	W	L	D	Place
(Chile) 2008	Group	3	1	0	3
(Georgia (country)) 2011	Group	3	1	0	3
(United States) 2012	Group	2	2	0	4
(Hong Kong) 2014	Group	2	2	0	5
(Portugal) 2015	Group	4	0	0	1

=== Georgia at World Rugby Under 20 Championships ===
Year	Round	W	L	D	Place
(England) 2016	Group	1	4	0	10
(Georgia (country)) 2017	Group	1	4	0	10
(France) 2018	Group	3	2	0	9
(Argentina) 2019	Group	2	3	0	10
(South Africa) 2023	Group	2	3	0	8
(South Africa) 2024	Group	3	2	0	9
(Italy) 2025	Group	2	2	1	9
(Georgia (country)) 2026	Group	1	4	0	12

== Wins against Tier 1 nations ==
20 June 2016	Italy	17–18	Georgia	AJ Bell Stadium, Salford, England
15:15 BST (UTC+01)	Try: Makelara 30' c Sperandio 80' c Con: Mantelli 31', 80+1' (2/2); Pen: Mantelli 67' (1/1)	Report	Try: Mataradze 17' m Gorgadze 55' m Miminoshvili 64' m Pen: Aprasidze 70' (1/2)	Referee: Cwengile Jadezweni (South Africa)

13 June 2017	Georgia	26–25	Argentina	Mikheil Meskhi Stadium, Tbilisi
15:30 GET (UTC+04)	Try: Saghinadze 3' c Spanderashvili 12' c Con: Aprasidze 4', 13' (2/2); Pen: Aprasidze 25', 34', 38', 76' (4/6)	Report	Try: Delguy 16' m Ferrario 41' c Malanos 80' c Con: Daireaux 42', 80+1 (2/2); Pen: Albornoz 10', 20'(2/2)	Referee: Jaco van Heerden (South Africa)

7 June 2018	Ireland	20–24	Georgia	Parc des Sports Et de l'Amitié, Narbonne, France
18:30 CEST (UTC+02)	Try: Dean 32' m Daly 77' c Wojtkowicz 81' m Con: Byrne 78' (1/2); Pen: Dean 13'	Report	Try: Machaladze 10' c Svanidze 21' c Abzhandadze 43' c Con: Aprasidze 10', 23', 44' (3/3); Pen: Aprasidze 16' (1/1)	Referee: Jamie Nutbrown (New Zealand)

17 June 2018	Scotland	31–39	Georgia	Stade de la Méditerranée, Béziers, France
12:30 CEST (UTC+02)	Try: Smith 7' m Trotter 14' c, 33' c Rowe 71' m Miller 75' c Con: Chapman 15', 34' (2/3); Thompson 75' (1/2)	Report	Try: Japaridze 2' m Marjanishvili 21' c, 63' c Gigolashvili 42' c Gogichashvili 55' c Con: Abzhandadze 23', 43', 56', 64' (4/4); Pen: Abzhandadze 49', 79' (2/2)	Referee: Andrea Piardi (Italy)

12 June 2019	Georgia	17–12	Scotland	Racecourse Stadium, Rosario, Argentina
	Try: Abzhandadze 56' m, Nioradze 73' m Con: Abzhandadze 57' m, 74' m Pen: Abzhandadze 46' m		Try: Ashman 4' m, 52' m Con: Thompson 5' m

6 July 2022	Scotland	17–55	Georgia	Stadio Comunale di Monigo, Treviso, Italy
15:00 CEST (UTC+02)		Report		Referee: Eoghan Cross (Ireland)

1 June 2023	Georgia	40–38	England	Avchala Rugby Stadium, Tbilisi
		Report		Referee: Nika Amashukeli (Georgia)

29 June 2023	Argentina	0–20	Georgia	Danie Craven Stadium, Stellenbosch, South Africa
16:30 SAST (UTC+02)		Report	Try: Khorbaladze 17'; Khonelidze 34'; Con: Khutsishvili (2/2) 18', 36'; Pen: Khutsishvili (2/2) 43', 55'	Referee: Hollie Davidson (Scotland)

4 July 2023	Italy	17–30	Georgia	Danie Craven Stadium, Stellenbosch, South Africa
19:00 SAST (UTC+02)	Try: Casilio 19'; Gallorini 44'; Con: Brisighella (2/2) 21', 45'; Pen: Brisighella (1/2) 14'	Report	Try: Lomidze 9'; Khonelidze (2) 28', 53'; Tchamiashvili 77'; Con: Khutsishvili (2/4) 11', 54'; Pen: Khutsishvili (2/2) 24', 35'	Referee: Damian Schneider (Argentina)

12 June 2024	Georgia	45–17	England	Avchala Rugby Stadium, Tbilisi
		Report		Referee: Nika Amashukeli (Georgia)

9 July 2024	Georgia	28–17	Italy	Danie Craven Stadium, Stellenbosch, South Africa
16:30 SAST (UTC+02)	Try: Khakhubia 17' c Penalty try 35'; Khaindrava 62' c Kachlavashvili 69' c Con: Tsirekidze (3/3) 18', 62', 70'	Report	Try: Belloni 13' c Gasperini 67' c Con: Brisighella (2/2) 14', 68'; Pen: Brisighella (1/1) 38'	Referee: Takehito Namekawa (Japan)

19 July 2024	Italy	13–24	Georgia	Athlone Stadium, Cape Town, South Africa
14:30 SAST (UTC+02)	Try: Siciliano 69' c Con: Pucciariello (1/1) 70'; Pen: Pucciariello (2/2) 10', 35'		Try: Gergedava 30' m Tsulukidze 44' c Kevkhishvili 60' c Keshelava 67' m Con: Tsirekidze (2/4) 45', 61'	Referee: Aimee Barrett-Theron (South Africa)

19 July 2025	Georgia	22–7	Scotland	Stadio San Michele, Calvisano
20:30 CEST (UTC+02)	Try: Kheladze 15' m Shioshvili (2) 22' c, 59' m Gurtskaia 30' m Con: Bolkvadze (1/3) 23'	Report	Try: Logan 33' c Con: Urwin (1/1) 34'	Referee: Griffin Colby (South Africa)

22 June 2026	Georgia	22–19	New Zealand	Kharebi Arena, Rustavi
12:00 CEST (UTC+02)		Report		Referee: Nika Amashukeli (Georgia)

== Current squad ==
Georgia squad for 2026 World Rugby U20 Championship

Player	Position	Date of birth (age)	Caps	Club/province
Giorgi Aghnashvili	Hooker		—	(France) US Carcassonne Espoirs
Anri Shvelidze	Hooker		—	(France) CA Brive Espoirs
Davit Archvadze	Hooker	2 October 2006 (age 20)	—	(Georgia (country)) Lelo Saracens
Giorgi Turashvili	Prop		—	(France) Castres Espoirs
Nikoloz Balanchivadze	Prop	19 April 2007 (age 19)	—	(France) Aurillacois Espoirs
Luka Iaseshvili	Prop		—	(Georgia (country)) RC Rustavi Kharebi
Levani Ezieshvili	Prop		—	(France) US Montauban Espoirs
Saba Nozadze	Prop	16 March 2007 (age 19)	—	(France) Nevers Espoirs
Gabriel Razmadze	Prop	29 May 2007 (age 19)	—	(France) Aurillacois Espoirs
Davit Baramia	Lock	7 January 2007 (age 19)	—	(France) RC Toulonnais Espoirs
Nikoloz Chkhortolia	Lock	30 January 2007 (age 19)	—	(France) Montpellier Espoirs
Andria Bilanishvili	Lock	13 May 2007 (age 19)	—	(Georgia (country)) Lelo Saracens
Giorgi Zazadze	Back row	20 June 2007 (age 19)	—	(Georgia (country)) RC Rustavi Kharebi
Giorgi Ardzenadze	Back row	27 March 2007 (age 19)	—	(Georgia (country)) RC Batumi
Irakli Kolbaia	Back row	16 December 2007 (age 18)	—	(Georgia (country)) Lelo Saracens
Luka Narsia	Back row	14 January 2006 (age 20)	—	(Georgia (country)) AIA Kutaisi
Mikheil Shioshvili	Back row	2 June 2006 (age 20)	1	(France) RC Toulonnais
Temur Dzodzuashvili	Scrum-half	24 November 2006 (age 19)	—	(Georgia (country)) AIA Kutaisi
Giorgi Khonelidze	Scrum-half	30 September 2008 (age 18)	—	(France) RC Toulonnais Espoirs
Davit Tsiklauri	Scrum-half	25 March 2006 (age 20)	—	(Georgia (country)) Khvamli Tbilisi
Mate Makharadze	Fly-half	22 March 2008 (age 18)	—	(Georgia (country)) Khvamli Tbilisi
Leonide Saldadze	Centre		—	(Georgia (country)) RC Locomotive Tbilisi
Data Akhvlediani	Centre	6 July 2007 (age 19)	—	(Georgia (country)) Lelo Saracens
Daviti Barbakadze	Centre	8 January 2007 (age 19)	—	(France) Lyon Espoirs
Demetre Devdariani	Centre	29 May 2007 (age 19)	—	(Georgia (country)) Lelo Saracens
Avtandili Zviadadze	Wing	20 March 2007 (age 19)	—	(Georgia (country)) AIA Kutaisi
Luka Tabatadze	Wing	7 May 2007 (age 19)	—	(Georgia (country)) RC Army Tbilisi
Saba Natroshvili	Wing		—	(Georgia (country)) RC Army Tbilisi
Nikolozi Khalvashi	Fullback		—	(Georgia (country)) Lelo Saracens
Data Arobelidze	Fullback	17 April 2007 (age 19)	—	(Georgia (country)) RC Army Tbilisi

== Overall ==
Opponent	Played	Won	Lost	Drawn	Win %	For	Aga	Diff
Argentina	3	2	1	0	66.67%	72	62	+10
Australia	1	0	1	0	0.00%	11	35	-24
Canada	3	3	0	0	100.00%	118	50	+68
Fiji	3	3	0	0	100.00%	82	57	+25
England	4	2	2	0	50.00%	128	127	+1
France	5	0	5	0	0.00%	70	175	-105
Hong Kong	1	1	0	0	100.00%	21	8	+13
Ireland	4	1	5	0	25.00%	65	101	-36
Italy	6	4	2	0	67.00%	136	129	+7
Jamaica	1	1	0	0	100.00%	90	3	+87
Japan	3	1	2	0	66.67%	67	87	-20
Namibia	1	1	0	0	100.00%	46	17	+29
New Zealand	4	1	3	0	25.00%	39	150	-111
Poland	1	1	0	0	100.00%	49	0	+49
Portugal	1	1	0	0	100.00%	19	11	+8
Romania	3	2	1	0	66.67%	61	44	+17
Russia	4	4	0	0	100.00%	122	49	+73
Scotland	3	3	0	0	100.00%	111	60	+51
South Africa	4	0	4	0	0.00%	74	172	-98
South Korea	1	1	0	0	100.00%	50	31	+19
Spain	1	1	0	0	100.00%	23	11	+12
Tonga	2	1	1	0	50.00%	63	41	+22
United States	1	0	1	0	0.00%	12	13	-1
Uruguay	3	2	1	0	66.67%	82	47	+35
Wales	3	0	3	0	0.00%	54	80	-26
Zimbabwe	2	2	0	0	100.00%	93	26	+67
Total	41	25	16	0	60.98%	1107	855	+252

== See also ==
- Georgia national rugby union team
- Georgia national under-18 rugby union team
