= 2015 European Under-19 Rugby Union Championship =

Tournament details
- Host: Portugal
- Date: October 25 – November 1, 2015
- Countries: 8
- Champions: Spain (1st title)

Tournament statistics
- Matches played: 12

The 2015 European Under-19 Rugby Union Championship (Rugby Europe Championship) is the ninth edition of the European Under-19 Rugby Union Championship for Under 19 national teams. It was held in Lisbon, Portugal from October 25 to November 1.

The tournament serves as Europe's qualifier for the 2016 World Rugby Under 20 Trophy.

== Matches ==
=== Quarter-finals ===
25 October 2015
11:00

Spain	11-0	Germany
	Report

CAR Rugby do Jamor, Lisbon
Attendance: 28
Referee: F. Murphy (Ireland)

25 October 2015
11:00

Portugal	17-3	Netherlands
	Report

CAR Rugby do Jamor, Lisbon
Attendance: 150
Referee: E. Tomo (Italy)

25 October 2015
13:00

Romania	87-0	Poland
	Report

CAR Rugby do Jamor, Lisbon
Referee: L. Cayre (France)

25 October 2015
17:00

Russia	22-13	Belgium
	Report

CAR Rugby do Jamor, Lisbon
Referee: A. Jones (Wales)

=== Cup ===
28 October 2015
17:00

Spain	30-7	Russia
	Report

CAR Rugby do Jamor, Lisbon
Attendance: 60
Referee: L. Cayre (France)

28 October 2015
19:30

Portugal	12-15	Romania
	Report

CAR Rugby do Jamor, Lisbon
Attendance: 300
Referee: F. Murphy (Ireland)

=== Bowl ===
28 October 2015
12:00

Netherlands	66-7	Poland
	Report

CAR Rugby do Jamor, Lisbon
Attendance: 60
Referee: A. Jones (Wales)

28 October 2015
14:30

Belgium	0-7	Germany
	Report

CAR Rugby do Jamor, Lisbon
Attendance: 20
Referee: E. Tomo (Italy)

== Play-off games ==
=== 7th-place game ===
31 October 2015
10:00

Belgium	43-27	Poland
	Report

CAR Rugby do Jamor, Lisbon
Attendance: 20
Referee: F. Murphy (Ireland)

=== 5th-place game ===
31 October 2015
10:00

Germany	22-22	Netherlands
	Report

CAR Rugby do Jamor, Lisbon
Attendance: 50
Referee: E. Tomo (Italy)

=== 3rd-place game ===
31 October 2015
12:00

Portugal	22-20	Russia
	Report

CAR Rugby do Jamor, Lisbon
Attendance: 100
Referee: A. Jones (Wales)

=== Final ===
31 October 2015
14:00

Romania	3-24	Spain
	Report

CAR Rugby do Jamor, Lisbon
Attendance: 200
Referee: L. Cayre (France)

== Final rankings and statistics ==
Ranks	Team	Score			Tries		Conversions		Penalties		Drops		Cards	
		For	Against	Difference	For	Against	For	Against	For	Against	For	Against	Red	Yellow
1	Spain	65	10	55	8	1	5	1	5	1	0	0	2	0
2	Romania	105	36	69	15	4	12	2	2	4	0	0	0	0
3	Portugal	51	38	13	4	4	2	3	8	4	1	0	1	0
4	Russia	49	65	-16	6	8	5	5	3	5	0	0	4	0
5	Germany	29	33	-4	4	2	3	1	1	7	0	0	0	0
6	Netherlands	91	46	45	11	5	9	3	6	4	0	1	2	0
7	Belgium	56	56	0	9	8	4	5	1	2	0	0	1	0
8	Poland	34	196	-162	5	30	3	23	1	0	0	0	3	0
