= Uruguay national under-20 rugby union team =

Uruguay
- Union: Unión de Rugby del Uruguay
- Nickname: Teritos
- Coach: Juan Baldomir
- Captain: Facundo Klappenbach
Team kit	Change kit

First international
- Uruguay 67–8 South Korea (15 April 2008)

Largest win
- Uruguay 82–0 Jamaica (19 June 2008)

Largest defeat
- South Africa 104–7 Uruguay (27 June 2026)

World Cup
- Appearances: 1 (First in 2009)
- Best result: 16th, 2009

The Uruguay under 20 rugby team is the junior national rugby union team from Uruguay. They replace the two former age grade teams Under 19s and Under 21s. The team competed at the World Rugby Under 20 Championships and World Rugby U20 Trophy.

Uruguay qualified for the 2015 Under 20 Trophy after defeating Chile 22-12 in the South American Junior Rugby Championship.

== Overall ==
Summary for all under 20 matches at the World Rugby Under 20 Championship and World Rugby U20 Trophy, including 2015:

Opposition	Played	Won	Drawn	Lost	% Won
Argentina	1	0	0	1	0%
Canada	4	1	1	2	25%
Chile	1	1	0	0	100%
Fiji	1	1	0	0	100%
Georgia	3	1	0	2	33%
Ireland	1	0	0	1	0%
Italy	1	0	0	1	0%
Jamaica	1	1	0	0	100%
Japan	3	1	0	2	33%
Namibia	2	2	0	0	100%
New Zealand	1	0	0	1	0%
Papua New Guinea	1	1	0	0	100%
Portugal	1	1	0	0	100%
Romania	1	0	0	1	0%
Russia	1	1	0	0	100%
Samoa	1	0	0	1	0%
South Korea	1	1	0	0	100%
Tonga	2	1	0	1	50%
United States	2	1	0	1	50%
Total	29	14	1	14	48%

== Results ==
Season	Tournament	Position
2008	JWRT	1
2009	JWC	16
2010	JWRT	5
2011	JWRT	4
2012	JWRT	Did not qualify
2013	JWRT	7
2014	JWRT	4
2015	JWRT	3
2016	JWRT	6
2017	JWRT	3
2018	JWRT	4
2019	JWRT	5

== Current squad ==
Squad to 2023 World Rugby Under 20 Trophy.

Forwards: Manuel Bertolotti; Joaquin Borrazas; Franco Bertini; Santiago Cagnone; Juan Ignacio Cambon (c); Martin Civetta; Tomas Coubrough; Francisco Deffeminis; Francisco Garcia; Maximo Lamelas; Juan Lorenzo; Maximo Lorenzo y Losada; Jeronimo Noseda; Felipe Pick; Manuel Rosmarino; Duban Silvera	Backs: Icaro Amarillo; Pedro Brum; Juan Carlos Canessa; Alfonso Chahnazaroff; Nicolas Conti; Juan Bautista Crisci; Juan Gonzalez; Pedro Hublog; Dante Soto; Guillermo Juan Storace; Joaquin Suarez; Arturo Ten Hoever

=== Management ===
- Gonzalo Camardon - Head Coach
- Ignacio Garcia - Team Manager
- Guillermo Storage - Assistant Coach
- Ignacio Inchausti - Assistant Coach
- Juan Manuel Fonseca - Physiotherapist
- Martin Gonzalez- Team Doctor
- Nicolas Martinez - Strength & Conditioning

== Outstanding squad ==
=== 2008 IRB Junior World Rugby Trophy: Champion ===
Uruguay Teritos
Eduardo Benítez
Juan Pablo Ruffalini
Rafael Tchilingirbachian
Diego Magno
Agustín Bordaberry
Juan Manuel Gaminara
Juan Diego Ormaechea
Matías Fonseca (C)
Francisco Vecino
Germán Albanell
Leandro Leivas
Adrian Lewis
Jerónimo Etcheverry
Tomás Jolivet
Santiago Gortari
Agustín Fiorito
Joaquín Rocco
Alejandro Nieto
Federico Pérez
Miguel Horta
Juan de Freitas
Santiago Gibernau
HC: Bruno Grunwaldt
HC: Martín Mendaro
