= 2022 Rugby Europe U20 Championship =

- Countries: Portugal
- Number of teams: 8
- Champions: Spain
- Runners-up: Netherlands
- Matches played: 12
- Tries scored: 57 (average 4.8 per match)

The 2022 Rugby Europe U20 Championship was the fifth edition of the tournament. It took place in Lisbon, Portugal from 6 to 13 November. The competition followed the same format as the previous year, with eight teams playing in a direct eliminations tournament with classification matches.

Spain won the Championship after beating the Netherlands in the Cup final.

== Teams ==
- Belgium
- Czech Republic
- Germany
- Netherlands
- Poland
- Portugal
- Romania
- Spain

== Results ==
=== Round 1 ===
==== Quarter-finals ====
6 November
10:25 (Local)

Netherlands	32–0	Germany
	Report

CAR Jamor Stadium, Lisbon
Referee: Daniel Carson (Ireland)

7 November
12:40 (Local)

Spain	51–13	Czech Republic
	Report

CAR Jamor Stadium, Lisbon
Referee: Alexandru Ionescu (Romania)

7 November
14:55 (Local)

Romania	6–18	Belgium
	Report

CAR Jamor Stadium, Lisbon
Referee: Jonathan Gasnier (France)

7 November
17:25 (Local)

Portugal	43–10	Poland
	Report

CAR Jamor Stadium, Lisbon
Referee: Saba Abulashvili (Georgia)

=== Round 2 ===
==== 5th-7th Place Semi-finals ====
9 November
10:25 (Local)

Romania	33–10	Czech Republic
	Report

CAR Jamor Stadium, Lisbon
Referee: Jonathan Gasnier (France)

10 November
14:50 (Local)

Poland	26–12	Germany
	Report

CAR Jamor Stadium, Lisbon
Referee: Franco Rosella (Italy)

==== Cup Semi-finals ====
10 November
12:40 (Local)

Belgium	6–25	Spain
	Report

CAR Jamor Stadium, Lisbon
Referee: Saba Abulashvili (Georgia)

10 November
17:20 (Local)

Portugal	14–19	Netherlands
	Report

CAR Jamor Stadium, Lisbon
Referee: Daniel Carson (Ireland)

=== Round 3 ===
==== 3rd Place ====
14 November
12:35 (Local)

Portugal	27–22	Belgium
	Report

CAR Jamor Stadium, Lisbon
Referee: Franco Rosella (Italy)

==== 7th Place ====
13 November
10:20 (Local)

Germany	26–17	Czech Republic
	Report

CAR Jamor Stadium, Lisbon
Referee: Alexandru Ionescu (Romania)

==== Cup Final ====
14 November
17:20 (Local)

Netherlands	6–13	Spain
	Report

CAR Jamor Stadium, Lisbon
Referee: Jonathan Gasnier (France)

==== 5th Place Final ====
14 November
14:50 (Local)

Poland	9–34	Romania
	Report

CAR Jamor Stadium, Lisbon
Referee: Saba Abulashvili (Georgia)

== Bracket ==
=== Cup Quarterfinals ===
Quarter-finals
Portugal	43
Poland	10
Netherlands	32
Germany	0
Romania	6
Belgium	18
Spain	51
Czech Republic	13

Semi-finals
Portugal	14
Netherlands	19
Belgium	6
Spain	25

Cup Final
Spain	13
Netherlands	6
3rd Place
Portugal	27
Belgium	22

=== 5th/7th Place Playoffs ===
Semi-finals
Poland	26
Germany	12
Romania	33
Czech Republic	10

5th Place
Romania	34
Poland	9
7th Place
Germany	26
Czech Republic	17
