= World Rugby U20 Trophy =

Rugby union competition

World Rugby Under 20 Trophy
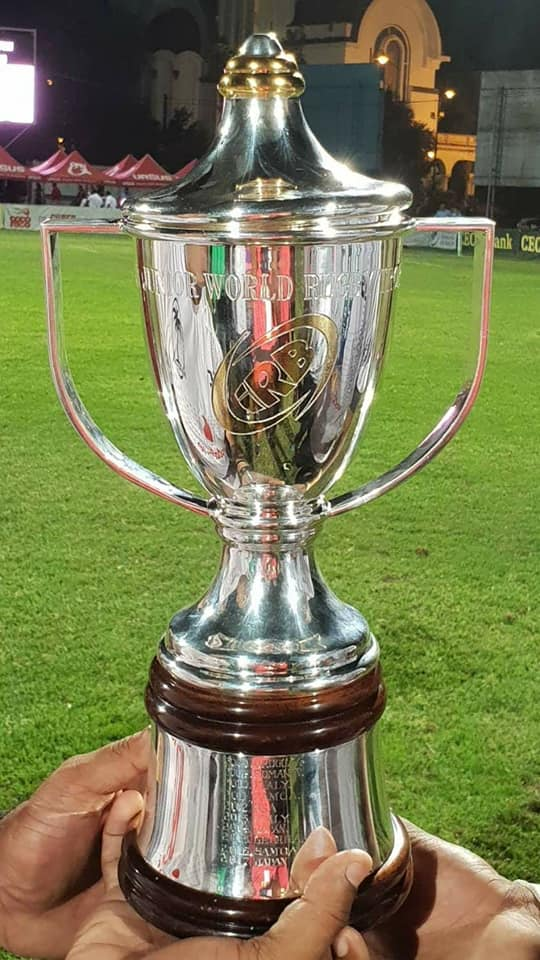
- The trophy awarded, pictured in 2018
- Sport: Rugby union
- Inaugural season: 2008
- Ceased: 2024
- Number of teams: 8
- Holders: Scotland (2024)
- Most titles: Japan (3 titles)
- Related competition: World Rugby Under 20 Championship

The World Rugby Under 20 Trophy (known as the IRB Junior World Rugby Trophy until 2014) was an international rugby union competition. The event was organised by the sport's governing body, World Rugby, and is contested by 8 men's junior national teams with an under-20 age requirement. This event replaced the World Rugby's former age-grade world championships, the Under-19 and Under-21 World Championships.

The inaugural tournament was held in June 2008, hosted by Chile and with 8 teams participating.

The World Rugby Under 20 Trophy was the second level of the World Rugby tournament structure for under-20 national sides. At the same time that the Trophy was launched, World Rugby (then known as the International Rugby Board) also launched an upper-level championship, featuring 16 teams in 2008 and 2009 and a reduced format for 12 teams from 2010 and onwards.

Promotion and relegation between the Trophy and the Championship was in place. The winner of the Trophy would play in next year's Championship, while the last placed team at the Championship would be relegated to the Trophy for the next year.

== History ==
The inaugural tournament was held in 2008, hosted by Chile, and won by Uruguay. World Rugby's decision that the United States would host the tournament in 2012 was viewed as the United States taking a step closer towards hosting the Rugby World Cup.

In 2025, World Rugby was exploring the possibility of expanding the annual U20 Championship from 12 teams to 16 by 2026. There was no tournament scheduled for 2025, however, a new cross-regional tournament called the "U20 Challenger Cup" was announced with Chile confirmed to host the inaugural event in 2026, it will feature a minimum of six teams.

== Tournament results ==
Ed.	Year	Host	Final			Third place match		
Ed.	Year	Host	Winner	Score	Runner-up	3rd place	Score	4th place
1	2008	Chile	Uruguay	20–8	Chile	Georgia	34–10	Romania
2	2009	Kenya	Romania	25–13	United States	Chile	19–17	Kenya
3	2010	Russia	Italy	36–7	Japan	Russia	23–20 (a.e.t.)	Romania
4	2011	Georgia	Samoa	31–24	Japan	Georgia	20–15	Uruguay
5	2012	United States	United States	37–33	Japan	Tonga	31–29	Georgia
6	2013	Chile	Italy	45–23	Canada	Chile	38–35	Japan
7	2014	Hong Kong	Japan	35–10	Tonga	United States	26–25	Uruguay
8	2015	Portugal	Georgia	49–24	Canada	Uruguay	44–43	Tonga
9	2016	Zimbabwe	Samoa	38–32 (a.e.t.)	Spain	Fiji	44–30	Namibia
10	2017	Uruguay	Japan	14–3	Portugal	Uruguay	34–12	Namibia
11	2018	Romania	Fiji	58–8	Samoa	Portugal	67–36	Namibia
12	2019	Brazil	Japan	35–34	Portugal	Tonga	29–27	Uruguay
Tournament canceled 2020–2022 due to impacts of the COVID-19 pandemic
13	2023	Kenya	Spain	39–32	Uruguay	Scotland	83–10	Samoa
14	2024	Scotland	Scotland	48–10	United States	Japan	75–22	Uruguay

== Team records ==
Team	Titles	Runners-up	Third-place	Fourth-place	Top 4
Japan	3 (2014, 2017, 2019)	3 (2010, 2011, 2012)	1 (2024)	1 (2013)	8
Samoa	2 (2011, 2016)	1 (2018)	—N/a	1 (2023)	4
Italy	2 (2010, 2013)	—N/a	—N/a	—N/a	2
United States	1 (2012)	2 (2009, 2024)	1 (2014)	—N/a	4
Uruguay	1 (2008)	1 (2023)	2 (2015, 2017)	4 (2011, 2014, 2019, 2024)	8
Spain	1 (2023)	1 (2016)	—N/a	—N/a	2
Georgia	1 (2015)	—N/a	2 (2008, 2011)	1 (2012)	4
Fiji	1 (2018)	—N/a	1 (2016)	—N/a	2
Scotland	1 (2024)	—N/a	1 (2023)	—N/a	2
Romania	1 (2009)	—N/a	—N/a	2 (2008, 2010)	3
Portugal	—N/a	2 (2017, 2019)	1 (2018)	—N/a	3
Canada	—N/a	2 (2013, 2015)	—N/a	—N/a	2
Tonga	—N/a	1 (2014)	2 (2012, 2019)	1 (2016)	4
Chile	—N/a	1 (2008)	2 (2009, 2013)	—N/a	3
Russia	—N/a	—N/a	1 (2010)	—N/a	1
Namibia	—N/a	—N/a	—N/a	3 (2016, 2017, 2018)	3
Kenya	—N/a	—N/a	—N/a	1 (2009)	1

Team	(Chile) 2008	(Kenya) 2009	(Russia) 2010	(Georgia (country)) 2011	(United States) 2012	(Chile) 2013	(Hong Kong) 2014	(Portugal) 2015	(Zimbabwe) 2016	(Uruguay) 2017	(Romania) 2018	(Brazil) 2019	(Kenya) 2023	(Scotland) 2024	Years
Brazil	—N/a	—N/a	—N/a	—N/a	—N/a	—N/a	—N/a	—N/a	—N/a	—N/a	—N/a	7th	—N/a	—N/a	1
Canada	WC	WC	6th	5th	6th	2nd	7th	2nd	—N/a	7th	7th	5th	—N/a	—N/a	9
Cayman Islands	—N/a	8th	—N/a	—N/a	—N/a	—N/a	—N/a	—N/a	—N/a	—N/a	—N/a	—N/a	—N/a	—N/a	1
Chile	2nd	3rd	—N/a	—N/a	5th	3rd	—N/a	—N/a	—N/a	5th	—N/a	—N/a	—N/a	—N/a	5
Cook Islands	7th	—N/a	—N/a	—N/a	—N/a	—N/a	—N/a	—N/a	—N/a	—N/a	—N/a	—N/a	—N/a	—N/a	1
Fiji	WC	WC	WC	WC	WC	WC	WC	5th	3rd	6th	1st	WC	WC	WC	5
Georgia	3rd	—N/a	—N/a	3rd	4th	—N/a	5th	1st	WC	WC	WC	WC	WC	WC	5
Hong Kong	—N/a	—N/a	—N/a	—N/a	—N/a	—N/a	8th	8th	7th	8th	6th	8th	8th	7th	8
Italy	WC	WC	1st	WC	WC	1st	WC	WC	WC	WC	WC	WC	WC	WC	2
Jamaica	8th	—N/a	—N/a	—N/a	—N/a	—N/a	—N/a	—N/a	—N/a	—N/a	—N/a	—N/a	—N/a	—N/a	1
Japan	WC	WC	2nd	2nd	2nd	4th	1st	WC	WC	1st	WC	1st	WC	3rd	8
Kenya	—N/a	4th	—N/a	—N/a	—N/a	—N/a	—N/a	—N/a	—N/a	—N/a	—N/a	6th	6th	8th	4
Namibia	5th	5th	—N/a	—N/a	—N/a	8th	6th	6th	4th	4th	4th	—N/a	—N/a	—N/a	8
Netherlands	—N/a	—N/a	—N/a	—N/a	—N/a	—N/a	—N/a	—N/a	—N/a	—N/a	—N/a	—N/a	—N/a	5th	1
Papua New Guinea	—N/a	6th	8th	—N/a	—N/a	—N/a	—N/a	—N/a	—N/a	—N/a	—N/a	—N/a	—N/a	—N/a	2
Portugal	—N/a	—N/a	—N/a	—N/a	—N/a	6th	—N/a	7th	—N/a	2nd	3rd	2nd	—N/a	—N/a	6
Romania	4th	1st	4th	—N/a	—N/a	—N/a	—N/a	—N/a	—N/a	—N/a	8th	—N/a	—N/a	—N/a	4
Russia	—N/a	—N/a	3rd	6th	8th	—N/a	—N/a	—N/a	—N/a	—N/a	—N/a	—N/a	—N/a	—N/a	3
Samoa	WC	WC	WC	1st	WC	WC	WC	WC	1st	WC	2nd	—N/a	4th	6th	5
Scotland	WC	WC	WC	WC	WC	WC	WC	WC	WC	WC	WC	WC	3rd	1st	2
South Korea	6th	7th	—N/a	—N/a	—N/a	—N/a	—N/a	—N/a	—N/a	—N/a	—N/a	—N/a	—N/a	—N/a	2
Spain	—N/a	—N/a	—N/a	—N/a	—N/a	—N/a	—N/a	—N/a	2nd	—N/a	—N/a	—N/a	1st	WC	2
Tonga	WC	WC	WC	WC	3rd	5th	2nd	4th	—N/a	—N/a	—N/a	3rd	—N/a	—N/a	5
United States	WC	2nd	—N/a	7th	1st	WC	3rd	—N/a	5th	—N/a	—N/a	—N/a	7th	2nd	7
Uruguay	1st	WC	5th	4th	—N/a	7th	4th	3rd	6th	3rd	5th	4th	2nd	4th	12
Zimbabwe	—N/a	—N/a	7th	8th	7th	—N/a	—N/a	—N/a	8th	—N/a	—N/a	—N/a	5th	—N/a	5
Total	8	8	8	8	8	8	8	8	8	8	8	8	8	8	8

Legend

- = Hosts
- 1st = Champions (promoted to U20 Championship)
- 1st = Champions (not promoted to U20 Championship)
- 2nd = Runners-up
- 3rd = Third place
- 4th = Fourth place
- WC = Competed in the U20 Championship
- q = Qualified
- — = Did not qualify
