= Spain national under-20 rugby union team =

Junior national rugby union team from Spain

Spain
- Union: Spanish Rugby Federation
- Coach: Ricardo Martinena
Team kit	Change kit

World Cup
- Appearances: 1 (First in 2024)

The Spain national under-20 rugby union team is the junior national rugby union team from Spain. The team competed at the World Rugby U20 Trophy.

Spain qualified for the 2016 Under 20 Trophy after defeating Romania 24-3 in the European Under-19 Rugby Union Championship 2015.

== Overall ==
Summary for all under 20 matches at the World Rugby U20 Trophy and World Rugby U20 Championship:

Opposition	Played	Won	Drawn	Lost	% Won
Fiji	1	1	0	0	100%
France	1	0	0	1	0%
Hong Kong	2	2	0	0	100%
Italy	1	0	0	1	0%
Kenya	1	1	0	0	100%
Namibia	1	1	0	0	100%
New Zealand	1	0	0	1	0%
United States	1	1	0	0	100%
Uruguay	1	1	0	0	100%
Samoa	2	1	0	1	50%
Wales	1	0	0	1	100%
Total	8	7	0	1	75%

== World Rugby Under 20 Championship and Trophy ==
Junior World Championship/Trophy
Year	Competition	Pld	Win	Draw	Loss	PF	PA	Diff	Finish
2008	Trophy	Did Not Qualify							
2009	Trophy	Did Not Qualify							
2010	Trophy	Did Not Qualify							
2011	Trophy	Did Not Qualify							
2012	Trophy	Did Not Qualify							
2013	Trophy	Did Not Qualify							
2014	Trophy	Did Not Qualify							
2015	Trophy	Did Not Qualify							
2016	Trophy	4	3	0	1	136	84	+52	2nd
2017	Trophy	Did Not Qualify							
2018	Trophy	Did Not Qualify							
2019	Trophy	Did Not Qualify							
2023	Trophy	4	4	0	0	168	60	+108	1st
2024	Championship	5	1	0	4	74	172	–98	11th
2025	Championship	5	0	0	5	115	198	-83	12th
2026	Championship	-	-	-	-	-	-	-	-

== Current squad ==
Squad to 2023 World Rugby Under 20 Trophy:

Forwards: Ariol Franch; Borja Ibanez; Álvaro García; Diego Gonzalez; Juan Guillermo; Christian Moreno; Ignacio Pineiro; Rodrigo Pelaz; Jacobo Ruiz; Javier Salomo; Antonio Suarez	Backs: Manex Ariceta; Jaimo Borondo; Noah Canepa; Daniel Catanzaro; Mario Coronado; Yago Fernandez; Javier Lopez De Haro; Martin Pena; Beau Peart; Pablo Perez; Eloy De La Pisa; Gabriel Rocaries; Valentino Rizzo; Daniel Sacristan; Marcel Sirvent; Martin Sorreluz; Alvaro Vichez

=== Management ===
- Raul Perez - Head Coach
- Paulo Perez - Team Manager
- Manuel De La Sota - Video Analyst
- Javier Carrido - Assistant Coach
- Manuel De La Sota - Physiotherapist
- Miguel Rodriguez - Physiotherapist
- Alberto Gomez - Team Doctor
- Helio Armengod - Strength & Conditioning
