= 2024 World Rugby Under 20 Trophy =

Under 20 rugby union championship

World Rugby Under 20 Trophy
Tournament details
- Host: Scotland
- Venue: 1
- Date: 2–17 July 2024
- Teams: 8

Final positions
- Champions: Scotland (1st title)
- Runner-up: United States
- Third place: Japan
- Fourth place: Uruguay

Tournament statistics
- Matches played: 16
- Tries scored: 167 (10.44 per match)

The 2024 World Rugby U20 Trophy was the fourteenth edition of the second-tier age-grade rugby competition. The tournament was held in Scotland for the first time.

The tournament was held at the 7,800 capacity Edinburgh Rugby Stadium in Edinburgh.

== Qualified teams ==
A total of eight teams were able to qualify. The hosts Scotland and the 2023 World Rugby Under 20 Championship relegation country Japan qualified automatically. The remaining six countries qualified through a qualification process in regional competitions (North America, South America, Europe, Africa, Asia, Oceania).

Host (1)

- Scotland

Relegated from 2023 JWC

- Japan

Asia Rugby (1)

- Hong Kong

Rugby Africa (1)

- Kenya

Sudamérica Rugby (1)

- Uruguay

Rugby Americas North (1)

- United States

Rugby Europe (1)

- Netherlands

Oceania Rugby (1)

- Samoa

== Match officials ==
The following 8 referees were announced as official World Rugby referees.

Referees

- Cauã Ricardo Santos (Brazil)
- Morgan White (Hong Kong)
- Katsuki Furuse (Japan)
- Sylvain Mane (Senegal)
- Ru Campbell (Scotland)
- Nicolae Fratila (Romania)
- Luis Fernandez (Spain)
- Ethan Glass (Switzerland)
- Lex Weiner (United States)

== Pool stage ==
=== Pool A ===
| Pos | Team | Pld | W | D | L | PF | PA | PD | TF | TA | TB | LB | Pts | Qualification |
|---|---|---|---|---|---|---|---|---|---|---|---|---|---|---|
| 1 | Scotland (H) | 3 | 3 | 0 | 0 | 270 | 25 | +245 | 40 | 4 | 3 | 0 | 15 | Advance to Final |
| 2 | Japan | 3 | 2 | 0 | 1 | 196 | 73 | +123 | 32 | 10 | 2 | 0 | 10 | |
| 3 | Samoa | 3 | 1 | 0 | 2 | 61 | 223 | −162 | 8 | 35 | 1 | 0 | 5 | |
| 4 | Hong Kong | 3 | 0 | 0 | 3 | 39 | 245 | −206 | 6 | 38 | 0 | 0 | 0 | |

Updated to match(es) played on 12 July 2024. Source: World Rugby
(H) Host

2 July
11:45 BST (UTC+01)

| Japan | 105–20 | Hong Kong |
| | Report |

Edinburgh Rugby Stadium, Edinburgh
Referee: Ru Campbell (Scotland)

2 July
17:15 BST (UTC+01)

| Scotland | 123–15 | Samoa |
| | Report |

Edinburgh Rugby Stadium, Edinburgh
Referee: Katsuki Furuse (Japan)

7 July
14:30 BST (UTC+01)

| Scotland | 101–0 | Hong Kong |
| | Report |

Edinburgh Rugby Stadium, Edinburgh
Referee: Nicolae Fratila (Romania)

7 July
17:15 BST (UTC+01)

| Japan | 81–7 | Samoa |
| | Report |

Edinburgh Rugby Stadium, Edinburgh
Referee: Cauã Ricardo Santos (Brazil)

12 July
11:45 BST (UTC+01)

| Hong Kong | 19–39 | Samoa |
| | Report |

Edinburgh Rugby Stadium, Edinburgh
Referee: Sylvain Mane (Senegal)

12 July
19:45 BST (UTC+01)

| Scotland | 46–10 | Japan |
| | Report |

Edinburgh Rugby Stadium, Edinburgh
Referee: Lex Weiner (United States)

=== Pool B ===
| Pos | Team | Pld | W | D | L | PF | PA | PD | TF | TA | TB | LB | Pts | Qualification |
|---|---|---|---|---|---|---|---|---|---|---|---|---|---|---|
| 1 | United States | 3 | 3 | 0 | 0 | 106 | 65 | +41 | 12 | 9 | 2 | 0 | 14 | Advance to Final |
| 2 | Uruguay | 3 | 2 | 0 | 1 | 72 | 55 | +17 | 10 | 4 | 2 | 0 | 10 | |
| 3 | Netherlands | 3 | 1 | 0 | 2 | 100 | 79 | +21 | 14 | 10 | 2 | 0 | 6 | |
| 4 | Kenya | 3 | 0 | 0 | 3 | 27 | 106 | −79 | 3 | 16 | 0 | 0 | 0 | |

Updated to match(es) played on 12 July 2024. Source: World Rugby

2 July
14:30 BST (UTC+01)

| Uruguay | 25–7 | Kenya |
| | Report |

Edinburgh Rugby Stadium, Edinburgh
Referee: Ethan Glass (Switzerland)

2 July
19:45 BST (UTC+01)

| Netherlands | 33–44 | United States |
| | Report |

Edinburgh Rugby Stadium, Edinburgh
Referee: Morgan White (Hong Kong)

7 July
11:45 BST (UTC+01)

| Uruguay | 15–32 | United States |
| | Report |

Edinburgh Rugby Stadium, Edinburgh
Referee: Sylvain Mane (Senegal)

7 July
19:45 BST (UTC+01)

| Netherlands | 51–3 | Kenya |
| | Report |

Edinburgh Rugby Stadium, Edinburgh
Referee: Lex Weiner (United States)

12 July
14:30 BST (UTC+01)

| Kenya | 17–30 | United States |
| | Report |

Edinburgh Rugby Stadium, Edinburgh
Referee: Nicolae Fratila (Romania)

12 July
17:15 BST (UTC+01)

| Uruguay | 32–16 | Netherlands |
| | Report |

Edinburgh Rugby Stadium, Edinburgh
Referee: Ethan Glass (Switzerland)

== Knockout stage ==
=== 7th place playoff ===
17 July
11:45 BST (UTC+01)

| Hong Kong | 34–14 | Kenya |
| | Report |

Edinburgh Rugby Stadium, Edinburgh
Referee: Cauã Ricardo Santos (Brazil)

=== 5th place playoff ===
17 July
14:30 BST (UTC+01)

| Samoa | 29–46 | Netherlands |
| | Report |

Edinburgh Rugby Stadium, Edinburgh
Referee: Ru Campbell (Scotland)

=== 3rd place playoff ===
17 July
17:15 BST (UTC+01)

| Japan | 73–22 | Uruguay |
| | Report |

Edinburgh Rugby Stadium, Edinburgh
Referee: Morgan White (Hong Kong)

=== Final ===
17 July
19:45 BST (UTC+01)

| Scotland | 48–10 | United States |
| | Report |

Edinburgh Rugby Stadium, Edinburgh
Referee: Katsuki Furuse (Japan)

- Scotland were promoted to the World Rugby U20 Championship.

== Final rankings ==
| Pos | Team | P | W | Diff. |
|---|---|---|---|---|
| 1 | Scotland (H, C) | 4 | 4 | +283 |
| 2 | United States | 4 | 3 | +3 |
| 3 | Japan | 4 | 3 | +176 |
| 4 | Uruguay | 4 | 2 | –34 |
| 5 | Netherlands | 4 | 2 | +38 |
| 6 | Samoa | 4 | 1 | –179 |
| 7 | Hong Kong | 4 | 1 | –186 |
| 8 | Kenya | 4 | 0 | –99 |

Updated to match(es) played on 17 July 2024. Source: World Rugby
(C) Champion; (H) Host

== See also ==
- 2024 World Rugby U20 Championship
