= 2023 World Rugby U20 Trophy =

Under 20 rugby union championship

World Rugby Under 20 Trophy
Tournament details
- Host: Kenya
- Date: 15–30 July 2023
- Teams: 8

Final positions
- Champions: Spain
- Runner-up: Uruguay
- Third place: Scotland

The 2023 World Rugby U20 Trophy was the thirteenth edition of the second-tier age-grade rugby competition. The tournament was held in Kenya for the second time, previously being held in 2009.

This Under 20 competition (alongside the Championship) was the first global U20's competitions held since 2019, with the 2020 edition in Italy cancelled due to the COVID-19 pandemic and the ongoing instability in the world following the pandemic delaying the return of the competition. There were however various regional U20 competitions with the Six Nations Under 20s Championship and Oceania Rugby Under 20 Championship continuing to take place.

The tournament was held at the 15,000 capacity Nyayo National Stadium in Nairobi.

== Qualified teams ==
A total of eight teams were able to qualify. The hosts Kenya and the 2019 World Rugby Under 20 Championship relegation country Scotland qualified automatically. The remaining six countries qualified through a qualification process in regional competitions (North America, South America, Europe, Africa, Asia, Oceania).

Host (1)

- Kenya

Relegated from 2019 JWC

- Scotland

Asia Rugby (1)

- Hong Kong

Rugby Africa (1)

- Zimbabwe

Sudamérica Rugby (1)

- Uruguay

Rugby Americas North (1)

- United States

Rugby Europe (1)

- Spain

Oceania Rugby (1)

- Samoa

== Match officials ==
The following 9 referees were announced as official World Rugby referees.

Referees

- Cisco Lopez (United States)
- Cauã Ricardo Santos (Brazil)
- Robin Kaluzniak (Canada)
- Tevita Rokovereni (Fiji)
- Kat Roche (United States)
- Precious Pazani (Zimbabwe)
- (Georgia (country)) Saba Abulashvili (Georgia)
- Craig Chan (Hong Kong)
- Sylvain Mane (Senegal)

== Pool stage ==
=== Pool A ===
Team	Pld	W	D	L	PF	PA	−/+	TF	TA	BP	Pts
Uruguay	3	3	0	0	121	71	+50	13	9	2	14
Scotland	3	2	0	1	130	83	+47	20	10	3	11
Zimbabwe	3	1	0	2	85	152	−67	11	20	2	6
United States	3	0	0	3	81	111	−30	8	13	3	3

15 July
10:00 EAT (UTC+03)

Scotland	64–33	Zimbabwe
	Report

Nyayo National Stadium, Nairobi
Referee: Robin Kaluzniak (Canada)

15 July
14:00 EAT (UTC+03)

Uruguay	33–31	United States
	Report

Nyayo National Stadium, Nairobi
Referee: Tevita Rokovereni (Fiji)

20 July
12:00 EAT (UTC+03)

Uruguay	51–14	Zimbabwe
	Report

Nyayo National Stadium, Nairobi
Referee: Craig Chan (Hong Kong)

20 July
14:00 EAT (UTC+03)

Scotland	40–13	United States
	Report

Nyayo National Stadium, Nairobi
Referee: Sylvain Mane (Senegal)

25 July
10:00 EAT (UTC+03)

United States	37–38	Zimbabwe
	Report

Nyayo National Stadium, Nairobi
Referee: Craig Chan (Hong Kong)

25 July
16:00 EAT (UTC+03)

Scotland	26–37	Uruguay
	Report

Nyayo National Stadium, Nairobi
Referee: Cauã Ricardo Santos (Brazil)

=== Pool B ===
Team	Pld	W	D	L	PF	PA	−/+	TF	TA	BP	Pts
Spain	3	3	0	0	129	28	+101	20	3	2	14
Samoa	3	2	0	1	74	80	-6	10	10	2	10
Kenya	3	1	0	2	65	98	−33	9	15	1	5
Hong Kong	3	0	0	3	43	105	−62	5	15	3	3

15 July
12:00 EAT (UTC+03)

Samoa	34–25	Kenya
	Report

Nyayo National Stadium, Nairobi
Referee: Saba Abulashvili (Georgia)

15 July
16:00 EAT (UTC+03)

Spain	53–0	Hong Kong
	Report

Nyayo National Stadium, Nairobi
Referee: Precious Pazani (Zimbabwe)

20 July
10:00 EAT (UTC+03)

Samoa	30–27	Hong Kong
	Report

Nyayo National Stadium, Nairobi
Referee: Cauã Ricardo (Brazil)

20 July
16:00 EAT (UTC+03)

Spain	48–18	Kenya
	Report

Nyayo National Stadium, Nairobi
Referee: Kat Roche (United States)

25 July
12:00 EAT (UTC+03)

Kenya	22–16	Hong Kong
	Report

Nyayo National Stadium, Nairobi
Referee: Tevita Rokovereni (Fiji)

25 July
14:00 EAT (UTC+03)

Spain	28–10	Samoa
	Report

Nyayo National Stadium, Nairobi
Referee: Kat Roche (United States)

== Knockout stage ==
=== 7th place ===
30 July
10:00 EAT (UTC+03)

United States	47–22	Hong Kong
	Report

Nyayo National Stadium, Nairobi
Referee: Precious Pazani (Zimbabwe)

=== 5th place ===
30 July
14:00 EAT (UTC+03)

Zimbabwe	64–10	Kenya
	Report

Nyayo National Stadium, Nairobi
Referee: Sylvain Mane (Senegal)

=== 3rd place ===
30 July
12:00 EAT (UTC+03)

Scotland	83–10	Samoa
	Report

Nyayo National Stadium, Nairobi
Referee: Robin Kaluzniak (Canada)

=== Final ===
30 July
16:00 EAT (UTC+03)

Uruguay	32–39	Spain
	Report

Nyayo National Stadium, Nairobi
Referee: Saba Abulashvili (Georgia)
