= Netherlands national under-20 rugby union team =

Rugby union team

Netherlands
- Union: Dutch Rugby Union
- Coach: Zane Gardiner
- Captain: Dave Koelman
Team kit	Change kit

The Netherlands national under-20 rugby union team represent Netherlands in Rugby union in under-20 competitions. They play in the European Under-20 Rugby Union Championship, where their highest finish was a third place in 2019.

== World Rugby Under 20 Championship and Trophy ==
Junior World Championship/Trophy
Year	Competition	Pld	Win	Draw	Loss	PF	PA	Diff	Finish
2008	Trophy	Did Not Qualified							
2009	Trophy	Did Not Qualified							
2010	Trophy	Did Not Qualified							
2011	Trophy	Did Not Qualified							
2012	Trophy	Did Not Qualified							
2013	Trophy	Did Not Qualified							
2014	Trophy	Did Not Qualified							
2015	Trophy	Did Not Qualified							
2016	Trophy	Did Not Qualified							
2017	Trophy	Did Not Qualified							
2018	Trophy	Did Not Qualified							
2019	Trophy	Did Not Qualified							
2023	Trophy	Did Not Qualified							
2024	Trophy	0	0	0	0	0	0	0	-
