= Tai Enosa =

American rugby union player

- Born: 3 June 1989 (age 37) Faga'alu, American Samoa
- Height: 5 ft 9 in (1.75 m)
- Weight: 175 lb (79 kg)
- Occupation: Professional rugby union player

Rugby union career
- Position: Fly-half
Amateur team(s)
Years	Team	Apps	(Points)
- Belmont Shore RFC
- Tempe RFC
2014–2018	San Francisco Golden Gate RFC		
Senior career
Years	Team	Apps	(Points)
2019–2021	San Diego Legion	15	(11)
2022	Seattle Seawolves	1	(0)
- Correct as of 30 October 2022
International career
Years	Team	Apps	(Points)
2009	United States U20	4	(23)
2011	United States	6	(7)
- Correct as of 25 December 2020
National sevens team
Years	Team		Comps
2009–2013	United States		17
- Correct as of 20 December 2020

Tai Enosa (born 1 October 1989) is an American rugby union player who plays fly-half for the Seattle Seawolves in Major League Rugby (MLR).

== Professional rugby career ==
Enosa has played for the United States national under-20 rugby union team, including playing in the 2009 IRB Junior World Rugby Trophy tournament held in Kenya, and helping guide the US team to a second-place finish.

Enosa was named to the US national sevens team in 2009, and in 2012 signed a professional contract to play full-time for the US national sevens team.

Enosa joined the USA Eagles player pool in 2009 and made his test match debut in 2011 against Tonga. Enosa scored the winning try that put the USA Eagles over Russia in their final Churchill Cup game. Enosa was a member of the US squad for the 2011 Rugby World Cup in New Zealand, where he played in one game.

On a club level, Enosa played for Tempe, before transferring to Belmont Shore.

Enosa played for the San Diego Legion of Major League Rugby (MLR) from 2019 to 2021, but joined Seattle Seawolves in 2022.

== See also ==
- United States national under-20 rugby union team
