= Madison Hughes =

American rugby union player

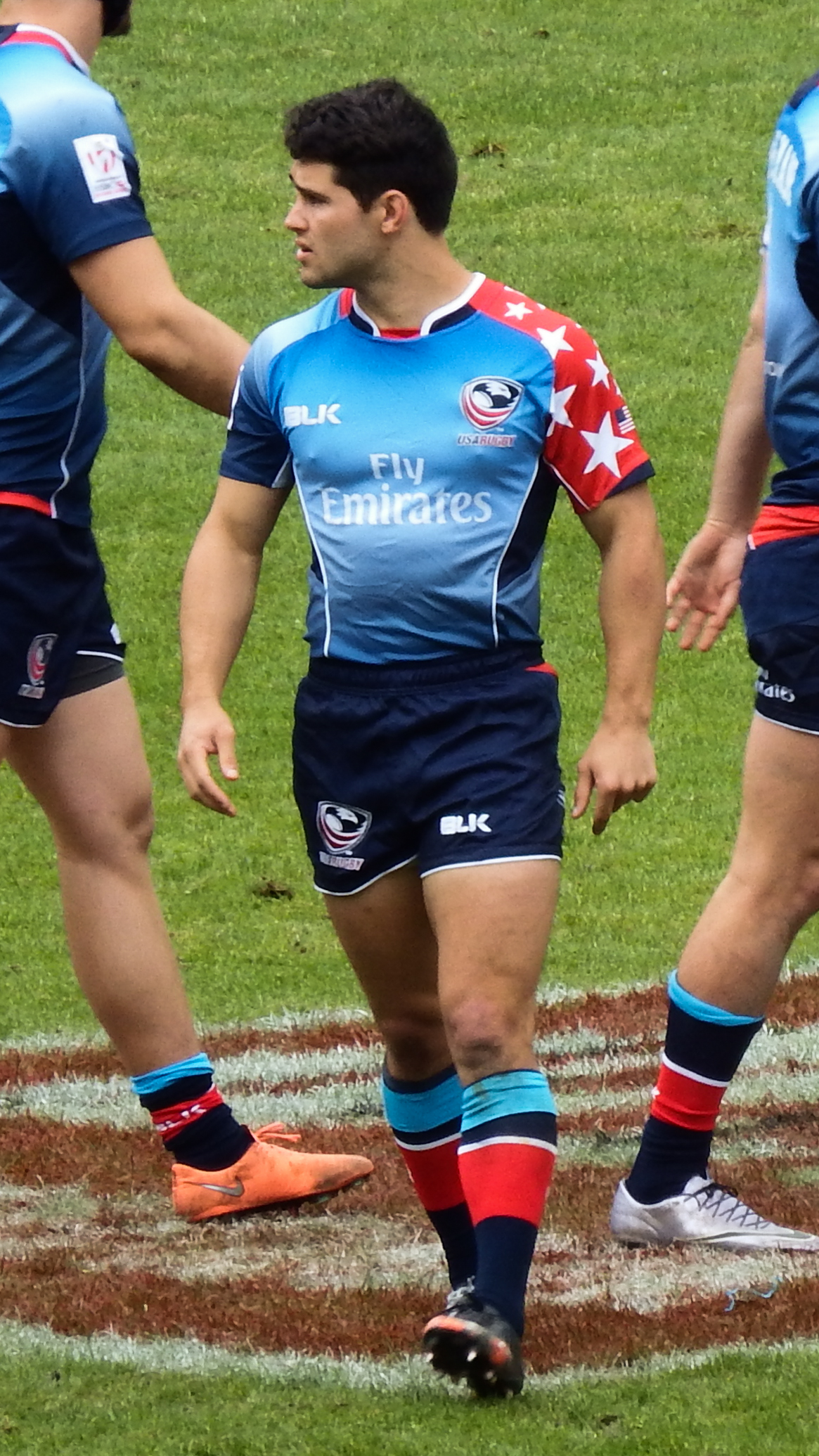
- Hughes representing the United States during the 2016 Paris Sevens
- Full name: Madison John Hughes
- Born: October 26, 1992 (age 34) Epsom, England
- Height: 5 ft 9 in (1.75 m)
- Weight: 175 lb (79 kg; 12 st 7 lb)
- School: Wellington College

Rugby union career
- Position(s): Scrum-half, Fullback
International career
Years	Team	Apps	(Points)
2011–2012	United States U20	8	(82)
2016–	United States	5	(5)
- Correct as of December 1, 2023
National sevens team
Years	Team		Comps
2014–	United States		56
- Correct as of December 1, 2023
Medal record
Men's rugby sevens
Representing United States
Pan American Games
Bronze medal – third place	2015 Toronto	Team competition

Madison John Hughes (born October 26, 1992) is a professional rugby union player who plays as a fullback. Born in England, he represents United States at international level after qualifying on residency grounds.

Hughes captained the US Eagles to their highest ever finish in the sevens series (sixth place) in the 2014/2015 season, a significant improvement on the team's 12th place finish the previous year. This feat was matched with another strong year in the 2015/2016 Season, where Hughes was the highest points scorer in the World Series.

Hughes was the second highest scorer for the 2015 series with 296 points. In the last leg of the series Hughes lead the Eagles to victory at the 2015 London Sevens, and was named player of the tournament at that event. Though American in status, he was born in England.

Hughes captains the Rocky Mountain Experts of Premier Rugby Sevens and led them to a fourth-place finish during the 2023 season.

== Early life ==
Hughes attended Wellington College, in England where he played rugby from 2006 to 2011. Wellington College is a public school which has also produced rugby players such as James Haskell, Thom Evans and Max Evans. He was also a member of the Wellington cricket, rackets and soccer teams, playing to county level for cricket, representing Surrey.

Hughes played college rugby as a fullback for Dartmouth College, and also played on Dartmouth's rugby sevens team. Hughes began playing with Dartmouth rugby as an 18-year-old freshman becoming the club captain by his junior year.

Hughes rose to national prominence with his performance for Dartmouth at the Collegiate Rugby Championship. Hughes was named to the CRC All-Tournament team in 2012, 2013, and again in 2014. In the 2012 CRC, Hughes was the tournament's third-leading try scorer with six tries. In the 2013 CRC, Hughes was the second-leading try scorer with eight tries and the second-leading points scorer with 58.

Hughes was captain of the 2013 7s All Americans and the 2014 15s All Americans.

== International career ==
=== United States Sevens ===
Hughes debuted with the United States national rugby sevens team in the 2013–14 season. Hughes was the leading scorer for the U.S. at the 2014 Wellington Sevens (33 points) and 2014 Japan Sevens (28 points).

For the 2014–15 season, Hughes was named team captain for the 2014 Gold Coast Sevens in October 2014, even though at 21 he was the youngest player in the team. Hughes again captained the USA 7's team to a sixth place finish in the 2015/2016 season, becoming the highest points scorer in the world for the year. Hughes was the U.S. starting scrum-half at the 2016 Summer Olympics.

Hughes competed for the United States at the 2024 Summer Olympics in Paris.

=== United States ===
Hughes played fullback for the United States national under-20 rugby union team. Hughes was the top scorer of the tournament at the 2012 IRB Junior World Rugby Trophy with 72 points, and was the U.S. leading try-scorer with four tries.

Hughes debuted for the United States national rugby union team fifteen a-side team in 2016, playing at fullback. He recorded three caps for the Eagles in 2016 before returning to rugby sevens for the remainder of the 2016-17 season.

== Premier Rugby Sevens ==
=== 2021 ===
During the inaugural PR7s season, Hughes commentated at the 2021 Memphis Tournament after announcing a month prior that he was stepping away from playing Sevens for a while. He analyzed 18 games throughout the tournament.

=== 2022 ===
In 2022, Hughes made his return to the pitch, suiting up with the Rocky Mountain Experts for one of the three tournaments during the PR7s season. Hughes competed in the second stop of the three-tournament circuit at Audi Field in Washington, D.C. Hughes compiled four conversions for eight points that day.

=== 2023 ===
During the 2023 season, Hughes captained the Rocky Mountain Experts. Hughes joined the Experts in 2023 leading them to one tournament win and an overall fourth place finish. Hughes ended the season with 21 points, one try, eight conversions, seven tackles and six steals.

At the Western Conference Kickoff at TCO Stadium in Minneapolis, the Experts went 2-0, securing their first tournament win of the season. The day started off with a 26-19 win over the SoCal Loggerheads and then a 22-19 walkoff win against the Golden State Retrievers.

The Experts fell short at the Western Conference Finals in San Jose at PayPal Park losing 15-12 to the Loggerheads. However, their second-place finish guaranteed qualification to the PR7s Championship in August. The Experts' first win of the day was a close 15-14 victory over the Northern Loonies. Hughes added one try, seven points, seven tackles at this tournament.

At the PR7s Championship at Audi Field in Washington, D.C., the Experts opened the day with a loss to the Loggerheads, condemning them to a third-place match against the Texas Team. The Experts went 0-2 in the Championship Tournament with Hughes converting three conversions for six points.

Although, the men Experts did not win an individual championship, the franchise won the 2023 PR7s United Championship, which combines the men's and women's season-long results for all five tournaments.

== Career statistics ==
=== International sevens series by year ===
WR 7s Season	Points Scored	USA Rank	World Rank
2013–14	98		
2014–15	296	1st	2nd
2015–16	331	1st	1st
2016–17	279	2nd	3rd
2017–18	105		
2018–19	299	1st	2nd
2019–20	98		
2021	—N/a	—N/a	—N/a
2021–22	—N/a	—N/a	—N/a
2022–23	—N/a	—N/a	—N/a
2023–24	86	4th	
Career	1,596	1st	5th

== See also ==
- Collegiate Rugby Championship
- United States national rugby sevens team
