= 2009 IRB Junior World Championship =

Tournament details
- Host: Japan
- Date: June 5, 2009– June 21, 2009
- Teams: 16

Final positions
- Champions: New Zealand
- Runner-up: England
- Third place: South Africa

Tournament statistics
- Matches played: 40

The 2009 IRB Junior World Championship (known as the 2009 IRB Toshiba Junior World Championship for sponsorship reasons) was the second annual international rugby union competition for Under 20 national teams, this competition replaces the now defunct under 19 and under 21 world championships. The event was organised by rugby's governing body, the International Rugby Board (IRB). The competition was contested by 16 men's junior national teams and was held in June 2009. It was hosted by Japan.

== Venues ==
City	Ground	Capacity
Tokyo	Chichibunomiya Rugby Stadium	27,188
Nagoya	Mizuho Rugby Stadium	15,000
Osaka	Kintetsu Hanazono Rugby Stadium	30,000
Fukuoka	Level-5 Stadium	22,563
Tosu	Best Amenity Stadium	24,490

== Pool Stage ==
=== Pool A ===
Team	Pld	W	D	L	TF	PF	PA	+/-	BP	Pts
New Zealand	3	3	0	0	22	140	9	+131	2	14
Ireland	3	2	0	1	8	61	26	+35	1	9
Argentina	3	1	0	2	5	51	79	-28	2	6
Uruguay	3	0	0	3	2	15	153	-138	0	0

5 June 2009
5:00pm

Argentina	9 - 16	Ireland
Pen: Rosati (3/4) 22', 25', 45'		Tries: Spence 13' c Con: McKinley (1/1); Pen: McKinley (3/5) 42', 50', 58'

Mizuho Rugby Stadium, Nagoya
Referee: (New Zealand) Chris Pollock

5 June 2009
7:00pm

New Zealand	75 - 0	Uruguay
Tries: Guildford (3) 9' c, 18' m, 36' c Stanley 11' m Stanaway-Teao (2) 15' c, 48' c Rei (2) 32' m, 43' m Wilson 59' c Treeby 65' m Robinson (2) 69' m, 73' m Eru 80' m Con: Rei (4/8); Cruden (1/2); Taylor (0/3)		Pen: Albanell (0/1); Ormaechea (yellow card) 55'

Mizuho Rugby Stadium, Nagoya
Referee: (Australia) James Leckie

9 June 2009
5:00pm

Uruguay	15 - 33	Argentina
Tries: Verde 19' c Etcheverry 60' m Con: Brancato (1/1); Albanell (0/1); Pen: Freitas (0/1); Brancato (1/2) 20'		Tries: Garriga 3' m Molina 25' m Guzman 38' m Bonilla 43' c Kessen 74' m Con: Bonilla (1/4); Rosati (0/1); Pen: Bonilla (2/2) 47', 51'

Mizuho Rugby Stadium, Nagoya
Referee: (England) Andrew Small

9 June 2009
7:00pm

Ireland	0 - 17	New Zealand
Pen: McKinley (0/1); Spence (yellow card) 59'		Tries: Stanley 54' c Treeby 63' c Con: Robinson (2/2); Pen: Cruden (1/3) 12'; Robinson (0/1); Robinson (yellow card)

Mizuho Rugby Stadium, Nagoya
Referee: (France) Jérôme Garcès

13 June 2009
1:00pm

Ireland	45 - 0	Uruguay
Tries: Shiels (2) 22' c, 34' c Kearney (2) 29' m, 44' c, Burke 49' c McGregor 64' c Keating 73' m Con: Murray (5/6); Burke (0/1); Pen: Murray (0/1)

Mizuho Rugby Stadium, Nagoya
Referee: (Italy) Carlo Damasco

13 June 2009
3:00pm

Argentina	9 - 48	New Zealand
Pen: Rosati (1/1) 11'; Bonilla (1/2) 64'; Drop: Lucchetti 22'		Tries: Wilson 41' c Guildford 44' m Tuitavake (3) 54' m, 59' c, 66' c Hall 72' c Dixon 74' c Con: Robinson (1/3); Rei (4/4); Pen: Robinson (1/2) 37'

Mizuho Rugby Stadium, Nagoya
Referee: (Australia) James Leckie

=== Pool B ===
Team	Pld	W	D	L	TF	PF	PA	+/-	BP	Pts
England	3	3	0	0	17	125	14	+111	3	15
Samoa	3	2	0	1	7	53	86	-33	1	9
Scotland	3	1	0	2	4	33	54	-21	1	5
Japan	3	0	0	3	5	27	84	-57	2	2

5 June 2009
5:00pm

Samoa	17 - 14	Scotland
Tries: Selesele 5' c Faimoa 58' c Con: Laulala (2/2); Pen: Laulala (0/1); Drop: Wilson 80'		Tries: Dunbar 50' m Con: Horne (0/1); Pen: Horne (3/4) 33', 38', 46'

Chichibunomiya Rugby Stadium, Tokyo
Referee: (England) Andrew Small

5 June 2009
7:00pm

England	43 - 0	Japan
Tries: Ovens 14' c York 24' c Eves 38' c Lowe 45' c Fearns 53' m Lawes 69' c Con: Homer (5/6); Pen: Homer (1/1) 20'

Chichibunomiya Rugby Stadium, Tokyo
Referee: (Scotland) Peter Allan

9 June 2009
5:00pm

Scotland	7 - 30	England
Tries: Jericevich 79' c Con: Horne (1/1)		Tries: Sharples 13' c Trinder 36' c Eves 41' m Fearns 77' m Con: Homer (2/3); Miller (0/1); Pen: Homer (2/3) 2', 40'

Chichibunomiya Rugby Stadium, Tokyo
Referee: (New Zealand) Chris Pollock

9 June 2009
7:00pm

Japan	20 - 29	Samoa
Tries: Toyosima 7' m Arita (3) 47' m, 59' m, 71' m Con: Toyosima (0/3); Tatekawa (0/1)		Tries: Sufia 4' m Laau 19' c Sefo 21' c Selesele 66' c Con: Laulala (3/4); Pen: Laulala (1/2) 15'

Chichibunomiya Rugby Stadium, Tokyo
Referee: (Australia) Ian Smith

13 June 2009
1:00pm

England	52 - 7	Samoa
Tries: Trinder (2) 3' c, 8' m Lowe 26' c Fearns (2) 31' c, 60' m Youngs 39' c Sharples 71' m Con: Homer (3/4); Miller (0/2); Pen: Homer (2/2) 12', 21'; Clegg (1/1) 44'		Tries: Falealii 49' c Con: Laulala (1/1)

Chichibunomiya Rugby Stadium, Tokyo
Referee: (France) Pascal Gaüzère

13 June 2009
3:00pm

Japan	7 - 12	Scotland
Tries: Minamihashi 11' c Con: Nakasone (0/1)		Tries: Anderson 28' m Fusaro 31' c Con: Horne (1/2); Pen: Horne (0/1)

Chichibunomiya Rugby Stadium, Tokyo
Referee: (Australia) Ian Smith

=== Pool C ===
Team	Pld	W	D	L	TF	PF	PA	+/-	BP	Pts
South Africa	3	3	0	0	19	144	40	+104	3	15
France	3	2	0	1	17	118	81	+37	2	10
Fiji	3	1	0	2	6	55	98	-43	0	4
Italy	3	0	0	3	2	30	128	-98	1	1

5 June 2009
5:00pm

France	43 - 13	Italy
Tries: Slimani 1' c Fall (2) 7' m, 55' m Cazenve 43' c Namy 52' m Guillot 70' c Doumayrou 77' c Con: Bernard (2/5); Barraud (2/2)		Tries: Benvenuti 79' c Con: Mortali (1/1); Pen: Benvenuti (2/2) 36', 45'

Kintetsu Hanazono Rugby Stadium, Osaka
Referee: (Argentina) Javier Mancuso

5 June 2009
7:00pm

South Africa	36 - 10	Fiji
Tries: Stander 24' m R. Ebersohn 49' c S. Ebersohn 55' c Mastriet 69' m Con: S. Ebersohn (2/4); Pen: Brummer (0/2); S. Ebersohn (3/4) 12', 39', 44'; Drop: S. Ebersohn 28'		Tries: Nakaitaci 15' c Con: Nakaitaci (1/1); Pen: Nakaitaci (1/3) 26'

Kintetsu Hanazono Rugby Stadium, Osaka
Referee: (New Zealand) Keith Brown

9 June 2009
1:00pm

Fiji	25 - 48	France
Tries: Yavala 2' c Nasau 37' m Nakobukobua 49' c Con: Vunaki (1/2); Nakaitaci (1/1); Pen: Vunaki (2/2) 26', 46'		Tries: Orioli (2) 9' c, 65' c Camara (2) 23' c, 42' c Griffoul 31' c Lauret 53' m Guillot 60' m Con: Barraud (2/2); Bernard (3/5); Pen: Bernard (1/2) 48'

Kintetsu Hanazono Rugby Stadium, Osaka
Referee: (Italy) Carlo Damasco

9 June 2009
3:00pm

Italy	3 - 65	South Africa
Pen: Benvenuti (0/2); Mortali (1/1) 68'		Tries: Van den Heever (2) 25' c, 31' m Seabela (2) 35' m, 68' c L. Cronjé (2) 43' c, 50' m S. Ebersohn 47' m R. Ebersohn 56' c Chikukwa 65' c Sadie 80' c Con: S. Ebersohn (4/8); L. Cronjé (2/2); Pen: S. Ebersohn (1/1) 4'

Kintetsu Hanazono Rugby Stadium, Osaka
Referee: (Scotland) Peter Allan

13 June 2009
3:00pm

Fiji	20 - 14	Italy
Tries: Ledua 42' c Matawalu 73' c Con: Nakaitaci (1/1); Seniloli (1/1); Pen: Vunaki (0/1); Nakaitaci (2/2) 13', 24'		Tries: Venditi 46' m Con: Benvenuti (0/1); Pen: Benvenuti (3/5) 9', 58', 75'

Kintetsu Hanazono Rugby Stadium, Osaka
Referee: (France) Jérôme Garces

13 June 2009
5:00pm

France	27 - 43	South Africa
Tries: Lapandry 3' c Doumayrou 20' c Penalty 77' c Con: Bernard (3/3); Pen: Bernard (2/3) 1', 31'		Tries: Mastriet (2) 40' m, 73' c Marais 41' c R. Cronjé 57' c L. Cronjé 69' m Con: Brummer (3/5); Pen: S. Ebersohn (0/2); Brummer (3/4) 35', 38', 45'; Drop: S. Ebersohn 7'

Kintetsu Hanazono Rugby Stadium, Osaka
Referee: (Wales) James Jones

=== Pool D ===
Team	Pld	W	D	L	TF	PF	PA	+/-	BP	Pts
Australia	3	3	0	0	24	164	11	+153	3	15
Wales	3	2	0	1	14	107	58	+49	2	10
Tonga	3	1	0	2	7	47	111	-64	1	5
Canada	3	0	0	3	5	35	173	-138	0	0

5 June 2009
5:00pm

Australia	86 - 0	Canada
Tries: Kingi (4) 6' m, 12' c, 57' m, 64' c Fitzpatrick 24' c To'omua (2) 31' c, 44' c Beale (4) 34' m, 48' m, 52' c, 73' m Tapuai 59' m Davies 66' c Coleman 69' c Con: To'omua (5/9); Kingi (3/5)

Best Amenity Stadium, Tosu
Referee: (Wales) James Jones

5 June 2009
7:00pm

Tonga	5 - 51	Wales
Tries: Mulikiha'amea 71' m Con: Hifo (0/1)		Tries: Gardiner 1' c Tipuric (2) 27' c, 46' c Williams 66' c Reynolds 74' c Sweet 76' c Con: Jarvis (4/4); Newton (2/2); Pen: Jarvis (3/5) 11', 25', 40'

Best Amenity Stadium, Tosu
Referee: (France) Pascal Gaüzère

9 June 2009
5:00pm

Australia	40 - 6	Tonga
Tries: Taumoepeau 4' c Charles 31' c Davies (2) 35' c, 76' c Murday 44' c Swanepoel 79' m Con: White (4/4); Beale (1/2)		Pen: Morath-Hansen (2/2) 9', 24'

Best Amenity Stadium, Tosu
Referee: (Fiji) James Bolabiu

9 June 2009
7:00pm

Canada	15 - 51	Wales
Tries: Pearso 35' m Crow 79' c Con: Jones (1/2); Pen: Jones (1/2) 32'		Tries: Loxton (2) 2' m, 44' c Gardiner 10' c Tipuric (3) 16' c, 34' c, 70' m Downes 61' c Con: Jarvis (5/6); Langdon (0/1); Pen: Jarvis (2/2) 24', 28'

Best Amenity Stadium, Tosu
Referee: (Japan) Taizo Hirabayashi

13 June 2009
1:00pm

Canada	20 - 36	Tonga
Tries: Beukeboom15' m Johnstone 56' m philippson 70' c Con: Jones (0/1); Braid (1/2); Pen: Jones (0/2); Braid (1/1) 33'		Tries: Finau 7' m Moli 21' m Lafo'ou (2) 30' c, 77' m Morath-Hansen 47' c Mulikiha'amea 50' c Con: Morath-Hansen (0/1); Hifo (3/5); Pen: Morath-Hansen (0/1)

Best Amenity Stadium, Tosu
Referee: (Argentina) Javier Mancuso

13 June 2009
3:00pm

Wales	5 - 38	Australia
Tries: Downes 71' m Con: Newton (0/1); Pen: Jarvis (0/3)		Tries: Anae 42' m Davies (2) 57' c, 69' c Simmons 75' c Con: Kingi (2/3); White (1/1); Pen: Kingi (4/4) 6', 14', 17', 25'

Best Amenity Stadium, Tosu
Referee: (New Zealand) Keith Brown

== Knockout stage ==
=== 13th-place play-offs ===
Play-off Semi-finals
1	Uruguay	11
4	Canada	29
3	Japan	15
2	Italy	21

13th Place Final
Canada	22
Italy	32
15th Place Final
Uruguay	17
Japan	54

Play-off Semi-finals

June 17th, 2009
5:00pm

Uruguay	11 - 29	Canada
Albanell P 37; Brancato P 42; Etcheverry T 49		Kliman T 14; Barrett T 34; Johnstone T 40+ Jones (C) C 40+ Kliman (yellow card) 61; Wilson-Ross T 67; Schneider T 78; Jones (C) C 79

Mizuho Rugby Stadium, Nagoya
Referee: (Wales) James Jones

June 17th, 2009
7:00pm

Japan	15 - 21	Italy
Yamashita T 10; Arita (C) T 59; Nakasone C 60; Nakasone P 67		Venditti T 13; Benvenuti C 14; Gori T 20; Benvenuti C 21; Gori T 38; Benvenuti C 39; Majstorovic (yellow card) 59; Lovotti (yellow card) 73

Mizuho Rugby Stadium, Nagoya
Referee: (Argentina) Javier Mancuso

15th Place Final

June 21st, 2009
12:00pm

Uruguay	17 - 54	Japan
De Freitas (yellow card) 17; Magno T 42; Albanell C 43; Pirotto T 51; Verde T 67		Tsurugasaki T 1 Nakasone T 13; Nakasone C 14; Shokai T 17; Nakasone C 17; Yamashita T 26; Nakasone C 27; Minamihashi T 31; Nakasone C 32; Minamihashi T 40+ Nakasone C 40+ Arita (C) T 47; Nakasone C 48; Shokai T 78; Tatekawa C 79

Mizuho Rugby Stadium, Nagoya
Referee: (Fiji) James Bolabiu

13th Place Final

June 21st, 2009
2:00pm

Canada	22 - 32	Italy
Jones (C) DG 17; Trainor T 22; Jones (C) C 23; Wilson-Ross T 40+ Jones (C) C 40+ Crow T 53; Wodzicki (yellow card) 62; Crow (yellow card) 73		Benvenuti T 14; Mortali P 20; Mortali T 30; Benvenuti C 31; Manici T 36; Mortali C 37; Lovotti (yellow card) 51; Manici T 62; Mortali C 63; Mortali P 64

Mizuho Rugby Stadium, Nagoya
Referee: (Japan) Taizo Hirabayashi

=== 9th-place play-offs ===
Play-off Semi-finals
1	Argentina	17
4	Tonga	26
3	Scotland	39
2	Fiji	26

9th Place Final
Tonga	25
Scotland	28
11th Place Final
Argentina	27
Fiji	10

Play-off Semi-finals

June 17th, 2009
1:00pm

Argentina	17 - 26	Tonga
De La Vega T 26; Rosati C 27; Guisasola T 50; Rosati T 53		Hifo T 5 Hifo C 6 Finau T 9 Fifita (C) T 13; Hifo C 14; Pakalani T 41; Hifo C 42; Finau (yellow card) 52

Kintetsu Hanazono Rugby Stadium, Osaka
Referee: (Scotland) Peter Allan

June 17th, 2009
3:00pm

Scotland	39 - 26	Fiji
Horne P 1 Anderson T 3 Fusaro (C) T 10; Horne C 11; Horne P 17; Gillies T 27; Horne C 28; Anderson T 43; Horne C 44; Gillies T 64; Horne C 65		Yavala P 23; Levula T 30; Ledua T 37; Murimurivalu (C) C 37; Nakaitaci P 51; Nakaitaci P 54; Murimurivalu (C) T 62

Kintetsu Hanazono Rugby Stadium, Osaka
Referee: (Japan) Taizo Hirabayashi

11th Place Final

June 21st, 2009
12:00pm

Argentina	27 - 10	Fiji
Lucchetti T 7 Rosati C 8 Rosati P 24; Rosati P 26; Ionna (yellow card) 42; De La Vega T 68; Bonilla C 69; Valega T 72; Bonilla C 73		Levula T 14; Vunaki C 15; Malai (yellow card) 22; Vunaki P 64

Kintetsu Hanazono Rugby Stadium, Osaka
Referee: (Italy) Carlo Damasco

9th Place Final

June 21st, 2009
2:00pm

Tonga	25 - 28	Scotland
Hifo P 8 Vaiomounga (yellow card) 10; Hifo P 15; Ngaluafe T 21; Hifo C 22; Hifo (yellow card) 52; Vaiomounga T 55; Paea T 70; Hifo C 71		Horne P 15; McInally T 18; Horne C 19; Johnstone T 29; Horne C 30; Horne P 49; Anderson T 52; McGowan P 69

Kintetsu Hanazono Rugby Stadium, Osaka
Referee: (Australia) Ian Smith

=== 5th-place play-offs ===
Play-off Semi-finals
1	Ireland	17
4	Wales	19
3	Samoa	6
2	France	16

5th Place Final
Wales	13
France	68
7th Place Final
Ireland	3
Samoa	9

Play-off Semi-finals

June 17th, 2009
5:00pm

Ireland	17 - 19	Wales
Tries: Keating 6' m Pen: McKinley (4) 30', 37', 67', 74'		Tries: Tipuric 21' c Con: Jarvis (1/1); Pen: Jarvis (4) 11', 25', 32', 44'; Loxton (yellow card) 26'

Level-5 Stadium, Fukuoka
Referee: (France) Jérôme Garcès

June 17th, 2009
7:00pm

Samoa	6 - 16	France
Pen:Laulala (2) 7', 28'; Sufia (yellow card) 10'; Totini (red card) 76'		Tries: Lapandry 19' c Con: Bosch (1/1); Pen: Bosch (3) 4', 9', 35'; De Marco (yellow card) 45'; Lamerat (yellow card) 70'

Level-5 Stadium, Fukuoka
Referee: (Fiji) James Bolabiu

7th Place Final

June 21st, 2009
12:00pm

Ireland	3 - 9	Samoa
Pen: McKinley 4'		Pen: Sefo 26'; Leleisiuao 37'; Laulala 68'

Level-5 Stadium, Fukuoka
Referee: (France) Pascal Gaüzère

5th Place Final

June 21st, 2009
2:00pm

Wales	13 - 68	France
Tries: Harries 78' c Con: Jarvis (1/1); Pen: Jarvis (2) 36', 40'; Pitman (yellow card) 54'; Tipuric (yellow card) 57'		Tries: Lapandry 12' c Bezy 16' c Lamerat 28' c Camara 43' c Colliat 58' c Slimani 60' c Bernard 67' c Guyot 75' c Con: Bernard (8/8); Pen: Bernard (4) 1', 5', 10', 19'; Camara (red card) 54'

Level-5 Stadium, Fukuoka
Referee: (Australia) James Leckie

=== Championship play-offs ===
Semi-finals
1	New Zealand	31
4	Australia	17
3	South Africa	21
2	England	40

Final
New Zealand	44
England	28
3rd Place Final
Australia	5
South Africa	32

Championship Semi-finals

June 17th, 2009
5:00pm

New Zealand	31 - 17	Australia
Tries: Guildford (2) 8' c, 51' c Treeby 48' c Robinson 64' c Con: Cruden (4/4); Pen: Cruden 55'		Tries: Fitzpaterick 19' c Tapuai 42' c Con: Kingi (2/2); Pen: Kingi 59'

Chichibunomiya Rugby Stadium, Tokyo
Referee: (England) Andrew Small

June 17th, 2009
7:00pm

South Africa	21 - 40	England
Tries: Stander 15' m Hanekom 54' c Con: Brummer (1/2); Pen: Brummer (3) 13', 40', 59'; Elstadt (red card) 64'		Tries: Youngs 41' c Gaskell 60' c Lawes 70' c Trinder 79' c Con: Homer (4/4); Pen: Homer (4) 3', 7', 10', 65'

Chichibunomiya Rugby Stadium, Tokyo
Referee: (New Zealand) Chris Pollock

3rd Place Final

June 21st, 2009
1:00pm

Australia	5 - 32	South Africa
Tries: Anae 14' m White (yellow card) 28'		Tries: Cronjé 4' m, 79' c Van den Heever 8' c Hanekom 52' c Con: Brummer (3/4); Pen: Brummer (2) 1', 20'; Schoeman (yellow card) 56; Stander (yellow card) 66

Chichibunomiya Rugby Stadium, Tokyo
Referee: (New Zealand) Keith Brown

Championship Final

June 21st, 2009
3:00pm

New Zealand	44 - 28	England
Tries: Robinson 14' m Guildford (2) 21' m, 59' m Cruden (2) 27' m, 30' c Treeby 43' c Mitchell 71' c Con: Cruden (3/7); Pen: Cruden 25'; Talakai (yellow card) 68'		Tries: Gaskell 17' m Fearns 49' c Lewis 77' c Con: Homer (1/2); Miller (1/1); Pen: Homer (3) 6', 12', 34'

Chichibunomiya Rugby Stadium, Tokyo
Referee: (Wales) James Jones

== Final standings ==
Pos	Team
1	New Zealand
2	England
3	South Africa
4	Australia
5	France
6	Wales
7	Samoa
8	Ireland
9	Scotland
10	Tonga
11	Argentina
12	Fiji
13	Italy
14	Canada
15	Japan
16	Uruguay

== See also ==
- 2009 IRB Junior World Rugby Trophy
