= 2018 World Rugby Under 20 Trophy =

Tournament details
- Host: Romania
- Date: 28 August – 9 September 2018
- Teams: 8

Final positions
- Champions: Fiji
- Runner-up: Samoa
- Third place: Portugal

Tournament statistics
- Matches played: 16
- Top scorer(s): (Namibia) Denzo Bruwer (59)
- Most tries: (Uruguay) Manuel Ardao (6)

The 2018 World Rugby U20 Trophy was the eleventh annually held international rugby union competition for Under 20 national teams, with host nation Romania, along with seven other sides, playing in a group stage followed by a knockout round to determine a champion as well as promotion to the following years' World Rugby Under 20 Championship.

== Qualified teams ==
A total of eight teams played in the tournament. Other than the host nation of Romania and Samoa who were relegated following the 2017 World Rugby Under 20 Championship, six nations qualified through their respective regional qualifiers.

Host (1)

- Romania

Relegated from 2017 JWC

- Samoa

Asia Rugby (1)

- Hong Kong

Rugby Africa (1)

- Namibia

Sudamérica Rugby (1)

- Uruguay

Rugby Americas North (1)

- Canada

Rugby Europe (1)

- Portugal

Oceania Rugby (1)

- Fiji

== Pool Stage ==
=== Pool A ===
Team	Pld	W	D	L	PF	PA	PD	TF	TA	Pts
Samoa	3	3	0	0	113	65	+48	18	9	15
Namibia	3	2	0	1	167	77	+90	21	12	10
Hong Kong	3	1	0	2	86	158	-72	12	24	5
Romania	3	0	0	3	76	142	-66	12	18	2

28 August 2018
13:00

Samoa	41–20	Hong Kong

Stadionul Arcul de Triumf

28 August 2018
19:00

Namibia	55–26	Romania

Stadionul Arcul de Triumf

1 September 2018
15:00

Namibia	84–10	Hong Kong

Stadionul Arcul de Triumf

1 September 2018
17:00

Samoa	31–17	Romania

Stadionul Arcul de Triumf

5 September 2018
19:00

Romania	35–56	Hong Kong

Stadionul Arcul de Triumf

5 September 2018
13:00

Samoa	41–28	Namibia

Stadionul Arcul de Triumf

=== Pool B ===
Team	Pld	W	D	L	PF	PA	PD	TF	TA	Pts
Fiji	3	3	0	0	140	82	+58	23	9	15
Portugal	3	2	0	1	79	76	+3	9	9	9
Uruguay	3	1	0	2	76	104	-28	11	15	6
Canada	3	0	0	3	78	111	-33	6	16	2

28 August 2018
15:00

Uruguay	34–55	Fiji

Stadionul Arcul de Triumf

28 August 2018
17:00

Portugal	31–29	Canada

Stadionul Arcul de Triumf

1 September 2018
13:00

Uruguay	27–23	Canada

Stadionul Arcul de Triumf

1 September 2018
19:00

Portugal	22–32	Fiji

Stadionul Arcul de Triumf

5 September 2018
15:00

Fiji	53–26	Canada

Stadionul Arcul de Triumf

5 September 2018
17:00

Portugal	26–15	Uruguay

Stadionul Arcul de Triumf

== Finals ==
7th place

9 September 2018
17:00

Romania	14–71	Canada

Stadionul Arcul de Triumf

5th place

9 September 2018
13:00

Hong Kong	17–78	Uruguay

Stadionul Arcul de Triumf

3rd place

9 September 2018
15:00

Namibia	36–67	Portugal

Stadionul Arcul de Triumf

Final

9 September 2018
19:00

Samoa	8–58	Fiji

Stadionul Arcul de Triumf
