= United States national under-20 rugby union team =

United States U-20
- Union: USA Rugby
- Nickname: Junior Eagles
- Coach: Billy Millard
- Top scorer: Madison Hughes (82)
| Team kit | Change kit |

First international
- United States 18–108 South Africa (June 6, 2008)

Largest win
- United States 64–15 Cayman Islands (June 21, 2009)

Largest defeat
- England 109–0 United States (June 13, 2013)

World Cup
- Best result: 12th (2013)

The United States national under-20 rugby union team is the United States' junior rugby team at the national level. The U-20 team has competed at the Junior World Championship and at several World U20 Trophy tournaments.

== History ==
The U20 program was originally a U19 team. With the decision by the International Rugby Board to merge their U19 and Under 21 Rugby World Championships to form the IRB Junior World Championship for U20 players effective as of the 2008 season, the team evolved into a U20 team to participate in the new competitions.

The first competition for the U20 team was on June 6, 2008, against South Africa. The United States won the 2012 IRB Junior World Rugby Trophy under head coach Scott Lawrence.

== Results ==
=== Junior World Championship ===
| Year | Pld | Win | Draw | Loss | PF | PA | Diff | Finish |
|---|---|---|---|---|---|---|---|---|
| 2008 | 5 | 0 | 0 | 5 | 68 | 240 | –172 | 16th place |
| 2009 | Did not qualify | | | | | | | |
| 2010 | Did not qualify | | | | | | | |
| 2011 | Did not qualify | | | | | | | |
| 2012 | Did not qualify | | | | | | | |
| 2013 | 3 | 0 | 0 | 3 | 3 | 251 | –248 | 12th place |
| 2014 | Did not qualify | | | | | | | |
| 2015 | Did not qualify | | | | | | | |
| 2016 | Did not qualify | | | | | | | |
| 2017 | Did not qualify | | | | | | | |
| 2018 | Did not qualify | | | | | | | |
| 2019 | Did not qualify | | | | | | | |
| 2020–2022 | Tournament canceled | | | | | | | |
| 2023 | Did not qualify | | | | | | | |
| 2024 | Did not qualify | | | | | | | |
| 2025 | Did not qualify | | | | | | | |
| 2026 | 5 | 1 | 0 | 4 | 136 | 305 | −169 | 15th place |

=== World U20 Trophy ===
| Year | Pld | Win | Draw | Loss | PF | PA | Diff | Finish |
|---|---|---|---|---|---|---|---|---|
| 2008 | Competed in the Championship | | | | | | | |
| 2009 | 4 | 2 | 0 | 2 | 138 | 97 | +41 | Runners-up |
| 2010 | Did not qualify | | | | | | | |
| 2011 | 4 | 1 | 0 | 3 | 82 | 152 | –70 | 7th |
| 2012 | 4 | 4 | 0 | 0 | 149 | 82 | +67 | Champions |
| 2013 | Did not competed | | | | | | | |
| 2014 | 4 | 3 | 0 | 1 | 98 | 63 | +33 | Third place |
| 2015 | Did not qualify | | | | | | | |
| 2016 | 4 | 2 | 0 | 2 | 124 | 106 | +26 | 5th |
| 2017 | Did not qualify | | | | | | | |
| 2018 | Did not qualify | | | | | | | |
| 2019 | Did not qualify | | | | | | | |
| 2020–2022 | Tournament canceled 2020–2022 due to impacts of the COVID-19 pandemic | | | | | | | |
| 2023 | 4 | 1 | 0 | 3 | 128 | 133 | –5 | 7th |
| 2024 | 4 | 3 | 0 | 1 | 116 | 113 | +3 | Runners-up |
| 2026 | Competed in the Championship | | | | | | | |

== Current squad ==
Match day squad for the 2023 World Rugby U20 Trophy qualifier against Canada.

| 1 | Thomas Wagner | University of New South Wales (UNSW) |
| 2 | Cade Crist | University of California - Berkeley |
| 3 | Connor Devos | Lindenwood University |
| 4 | Dylan Fortune | Lindenwood University |
| 5 | Will Sherman | UCLA |
| 6 | Cameron McAlpine | United Kingdom |
| 7 | Hayden McKay | Young Glory (Old Glory DC) |
| 8 | Aidan Christians | USA Hawks |
| 9 | Cormac Saint | University of California - Berkeley |
| 10 | Hugh O'Kennedy | Trinity College - Dublin |
| 11 | Sosaia Pongi | St. Mary's College of California |
| 12 | Aki Pulu | American Raptors |
| 13 | Dominic Besag | St. Mary's College of California |
| 14 | Corbin Smith | Hartpury University |
| 15 | Steffan Crimp | Cardiff Metropolitan University |
Substitutions:
| 16 | Gabriel Hayden (No. 24) | Canterbury RFC (UK) |
| 17 | Trevion Reed (No. 25) | Queens University |
| 18 | Leon Best | Life University |
| 19 | Logan Ballinger | Life University |
| 20 | Henry Duke | Unattached |
| 21 | Oliver Cline | Central Washington University |
| 22 | Thomas Hannon | Indiana University |
| 23 | Aaron Faison | Life University |
Coach:
(United States) Kyle Sumsion

=== Management ===
- Kyle Sumsion - Head coach
- Colton Cariaga - Assistant coach
- Elvis Seveali'i - Assistant coach
- Neethling Gericke - Assistant coach
- Matoko Noudehou - Performance Coach

George Janke - Performance Analyst

- Zach Fornier - Physiotherapist
- Gary McMahon - Team Manager

== Notable players ==
=== Scoring leaders ===
- Madison Hughes - 82 points scored (including 12 penalties & 6 tries) in JWRT competitions.
- Robert Johnson - 35 points scored (including 12 conversions) in JWRT competitions.
- Tai Enosa - 3 drop goals in JRWT competitions (tied for all-time lead among players from all countries).

=== Graduates to men's national team ===
The following players, who have played for the U.S. youth team, have also gone on to represent the senior men's team in 15s or 7s:

- Madison Hughes - A key player in the U.S. U20s to their first JWRT victory, scoring 100 points to become the all-time JWRT leading scorer. Hughes captained the U.S. Sevens team bound for the Rio 2016 Olympics.
- Todd Clever
- Mike Petri
- Takudzwa Ngwenya
- Tai Enosa - 2009 JWRT scored 23 pts
- Zack Test - 2009 JWRT scored 3 tries
- Peter Tiberio - 2009 JWRT started 3 matches
- Cam Dolan - 2009 JWRT team captain

== See also ==
- United States national under-23 rugby union team (Collegiate All Americans)
