= Japan national under-20 rugby union team =

Japan U-20
- Union: Japan Rugby Football Union
- Coach: Keisuke Sawaki
Team kit

First international
- Japan 17–53 France (6 June 2008)

Largest win
- Japan 105–20 Hong Kong (2 July 2024)

Largest defeat
- New Zealand 75–0 Japan (3 May 2015)

World Cup
- Appearances: 2 (First in 2008)
- Best result: 15th, 2008 & 2009

The Japan national under-20 rugby union team is Japan's junior national team in rugby union.

Japan won the IRB Junior World Rugby Trophy in 2014, beating Tonga in the final 35–10. This qualified them for the 2015 IRB Junior World Championship in Italy. The team also competed at the Oceania U20 Championship in 2015.

== Players ==
=== Recent squad ===
This is the squad for the 2014 IRB Junior World Rugby Trophy.

| Forwards: Daigo Hashimoto; Jiwon Koo; Shogo Miura; Takumi Tsukahara; Takayuki Watanabe; Kosuke Horikoshi; Shunta Nakamura; Ryeongji Kim; Eishin Kuwano; Shoma Makinouchi; Yuto Ueda; Ryoi Kamei; Sota Oketani; Takeo Suenaga | Backs: Ippei Okada; Genki Okoshi; Rikiya Matsuda; Keisuke Moriya; Yoshiki Hamagishi; Kanta Ishida; Yuki Okada; Kenichiro Kuwae; Chihito Matsui; Shuhei Narita; Seiya Ozaki; Ryuji Noguchi |

=== Award winners ===
The following Japan U20s players have been recognised at the World Rugby Awards since 2008:

World Rugby Junior Player of the Year
| Year | Nominees | Winners |
|---|---|---|
| 2016 | Ataata Moeakiola | — |

=== Management ===
- Keisuke Sawaki - Head Coach
- Shingo Mishima - Team Manager
- Saturo Endo - Assistant Coach
- Takayuki Kawasaki - Team Doctor
- Satoshi Tashiro - Trainer
- Yusuke Sakai - Strength & Conditioning
- Hideaki Noguchi - Performance Analyst

== Tournament record ==
=== 2012 Junior World Rugby Trophy ===
==== Pool ====
- Japan 39 - 36 Zimbabwe
- Japan 38 - 35 Canada
- Japan 36 - 29 Georgia

==== Final ====
- United States 37 - 33 Japan

2026 World Rugby Junior World Championship

== See also ==
- Japan national rugby union team
- Japan national rugby sevens team
