= 2010 IRB Junior World Rugby Trophy =

Tournament details
- Host nation: Russia
- Dates: 18 May 2010 – 30 May 2010
- No. of nations: 8

Final positions
- Champions: Italy
- Runner-up: Japan

Tournament statistics
- Matches played: 16
- Top scorer(s): Alberto Chillon (ITA)
- Most tries: Takaaki Nakazuru (JPN)

The 2010 IRB Junior World Rugby Trophy was the third IRB Junior World Rugby Trophy, a second-tier rugby union world championship for Under-20 national teams. The event was organised by rugby's governing body, the International Rugby Board (IRB). This competition, which contested by eight men's junior national teams and was held in Moscow, Russia from May 18 to May 30.

== Venues ==
City	Ground	Capacity
Moscow	Fili Stadium	
Moscow	Slava Stadium	

== Pools ==
=== Pool A ===
Team	Pld	W	D	L	TF	PF	PA	+/-	BP	Pts
Italy	3	3	0	0	17	120	19	+101	2	14
Romania	3	2	0	1	8	70	54	+24	1	9
Uruguay	3	1	0	2	5	66	45	+21	3	7
Papua New Guinea	3	0	0	3	4	26	164	−138	0	0

All match times are Moscow Time (UTC+3).

18 May 2010
4:00pm

Papua New Guinea	0–74	Italy
	Report

Fili Stadium, Moscow

18 May 2010
4:00pm

Uruguay	12–15	Romania
	Report

Slava Stadium, Moscow

22 May 2010
2:00am

Uruguay	42–14	Papua New Guinea
	Report

Fili Stadium, Moscow

22 May 2010
2:00pm

Italy	30–7	Romania
	Report

Slava Stadium, Moscow

26 May 2010
4:00pm

Romania	48–12	Papua New Guinea
	Report

Fili Stadium, Moscow

26 May 2010
4:00pm

Italy	16–12	Uruguay
	Report

Slava Stadium, Moscow

=== Pool B ===
Team	Pld	W	D	L	TF	PF	PA	+/-	BP	Pts
Japan	3	2	1	0	11	89	54	+35	1	11
Russia	3	2	0	1	9	55	65	−10	0	8
Canada	3	1	0	2	5	54	61	−7	1	5
Zimbabwe	3	0	1	2	3	45	63	−18	1	3

All match times are Moscow Time (UTC+3).

18 May 2010
6:00pm

Canada	22–6	Zimbabwe
	Report

Fili Stadium, Moscow

18 May 2010
6:15pm

Russia	17–31	Japan
	Report

Slava Stadium, Moscow

22 May 2010
4:00pm

Japan	20–20	Zimbabwe
	Report

Fili Stadium, Moscow

22 May 2010
4:00pm

Russia	17–15	Canada
	Report

Slava Stadium, Moscow

26 May 2010
8:00pm

Zimbabwe	19–21	Russia
	Report

Fili Stadium, Moscow

26 May 2010
8:00pm

Canada	17–38	Japan
	Report

Slava Stadium, Moscow

== Playoffs ==
=== 7th place play-off ===
30 May 2010
1:00pm

Papua New Guinea	22–46	Zimbabwe
	Report

Fili Stadium, Moscow

=== 5th place play-off ===
30 May 2010
3:15pm

Uruguay	13–11	Canada
	Report

Fili Stadium, Moscow

=== 3rd place play-off ===
30 May 2010
4:15pm

Romania	20–23 (a.e.t.)	Russia
	Report

Slava Stadium, Moscow

=== Final ===
30 May 2010
6:30pm

Italy	36–7	Japan
	Report

Slava Stadium, Moscow

== See also ==
- 2010 IRB Junior World Championship
