= 2015 World Rugby Under 20 Trophy =

Tournament details
- Host: Portugal
- Date: 12 – 24 May 2015
- Teams: 8

Final positions
- Champions: Georgia
- Runner-up: Canada
- Third place: Uruguay

Tournament statistics
- Matches played: 16
- Top scorer(s): (Georgia (country)) Rezi Jinchvelashvili (51)
- Most tries: (Namibia) Christo van der Merwe (5)

The 2015 World Rugby U20 Trophy was the eighth annual international rugby union competition for Under 20 national teams, second-tier world championship. A total of 8 nations played in the tournament.

The event was held in Portugal and was organized by rugby's governing body, World Rugby.

== Venues ==
The championship was held in Lisbon.

Location	Venue	Capacity
Lisbon	Estádio Universitário de Lisboa	8,000
Lisbon	CAR Rugby do Jamor	

== Teams ==
Pool	Team	Number of Tournaments	Position Last Year	Best Position
B	Canada	5	7	2nd in 2013
A	Fiji	0	Relegated from 2014 IRB JWC	1st appearance
A	Georgia	5	5	3rd in 2008, 2011
B	Hong Kong	1	8	8th in 2014
B	Namibia	4	6	5th in 2008, 2009
A	Portugal	2	N/A	6th in 2013
B	Tonga	3	2	2nd in 2014
A	Uruguay	5	4	Won the Trophy in 2008

== Pool Stage ==
=== Pool A ===
Team	Pld	W	D	L	PF	PA	PD	TF	TA	Pts
Georgia	3	3	0	0	95	36	+59	13	4	13
Uruguay	3	2	0	1	77	98	-21	10	15	10
Fiji	3	1	0	2	73	77	-4	10	7	7
Portugal	3	0	0	3	56	90	-34	5	12	0

==== Fixtures ====
12 May 2015
17:00

Uruguay	12 – 46	Georgia
	Report

CAR Rugby do Jamor, Lisbon

12 May 2015
19:00

Fiji	34 – 19	Portugal
	Report

CAR Rugby do Jamor, Lisbon

16 May 2015
15:00

Uruguay	37 – 26	Portugal
	Report

CAR Rugby do Jamor, Lisbon

16 May 2015
17:00

Fiji	13 – 30	Georgia
	Report

CAR Rugby do Jamor, Lisbon

20 May 2015
17:00

Georgia	19 – 11	Portugal
	Report

CAR Rugby do Jamor, Lisbon

20 May 2015
19:00

Fiji	26 – 28	Uruguay
	Report

CAR Rugby do Jamor, Lisbon

=== Pool B ===
Team	Pld	W	D	L	PF	PA	PD	TF	TA	Pts
Canada	3	3	0	0	72	46	+26	8	6	13
Tonga	3	2	0	1	91	40	+51	13	4	11
Namibia	3	1	0	2	67	92	-25	10	14	5
Hong Kong	3	0	0	3	43	95	-52	5	12	0

==== Fixtures ====
12 May 2015
17:00

Canada	35 – 20	Namibia
	Report

Estádio Universitário de Lisboa, Lisbon

12 May 2015
19:00

Tonga	35 – 16	Hong Kong
	Report

Estádio Universitário de Lisboa, Lisbon

16 May 2015
15:00

Canada	24 – 15	Hong Kong
	Report

Estádio Universitário de Lisboa, Lisbon

16 May 2015
19:00

Tonga	45 – 11	Namibia
	Report

Estádio Universitário de Lisboa, Lisbon

20 May 2015
17:00

Namibia	36 – 12	Hong Kong
	Report

Estádio Universitário de Lisboa, Lisbon

20 May 2015
19:00

Tonga	11 – 13	Canada
	Report

Estádio Universitário de Lisboa, Lisbon

== Placement matches ==
=== 7th place game ===
24 May 2015
11:00

Portugal	47 – 21	Hong Kong
	Report

CAR Rugby do Jamor, Lisbon

=== 5th place game ===
24 May 2015
13:00

Fiji	36 – 24	Namibia
	Report

CAR Rugby do Jamor, Lisbon

=== Third place game ===
24 May 2015
15:00

Uruguay	44 – 43	Tonga
	Report

Estádio Universitário de Lisboa, Lisbon

=== Final ===
24 May 2015
17:00

Georgia	49 – 24	Canada
	Report

Estádio Universitário de Lisboa, Lisbon
