= 2016 World Rugby Under 20 Trophy =

Tournament details
- Host: Zimbabwe
- Date: 19 April – 1 May 2016
- Teams: 8

Final positions
- Champions: Samoa
- Runner-up: Spain
- Third place: Fiji

Tournament statistics
- Matches played: 16
- Top scorer(s): (United States) Hanco Germishuys (48)
- Most tries: (United States) Hanco Germishuys (8)

The 2016 World Rugby U20 Trophy was the ninth annual international rugby union competition for Under 20 national teams, second-tier world championship.

The event was held in Harare, Zimbabwe and was organized by rugby's governing body, World Rugby.

== Venue ==
The championship was held in Harare.

Location	Venue	Capacity
Harare	Harare Sports Club Ground	10,000
Harare	National Sports Stadium	60,000

== Qualifying ==
As the host nation, Zimbabwe qualified automatically, as did Samoa for being relegated from 2015 World Rugby Under 20 Championship. The remaining six countries competed through a qualification process in their regional competitions (Africa, Asia, North America, South America and Europe).

=== Qualifying teams ===
A total of 8 teams played in the tournament.

Asia Rugby (1)

- Hong Kong

Rugby Africa (2)

- Zimbabwe
- Namibia

Sudamérica Rugby (1)

- Uruguay

Rugby Americas North (1)

- United States

Rugby Europe (1)

- Spain

Oceania Rugby (2)

- Fiji
- Samoa

== Teams ==
Pool	Team	Number of Tournaments	Position Last Year	Best Position
	Fiji	1	5	5th (2015)
	Hong Kong	2	8	8th (2014, 2015)
	Namibia	5	6	5th (2008, 2009)
	Samoa	1	12th, 2015 JWC	1st (2011)
	Spain	0	N/A	N/A
	United States	4	N/A	1st (2012)
	Uruguay	6	3	1st (2008)
	Zimbabwe	3	N/A	7th (2010, 2012)

== Pool Stage ==
Venue: Harare Sports Club, Harare

=== Pool A ===
Team	Pld	W	D	L	PF	PA	PD	TF	TA	Pts
Samoa	3	3	0	0	142	54	+88	19	7	15
Fiji	3	2	0	1	88	88	0	6	9	10
Uruguay	3	1	0	2	106	116	–10	16	15	7
Zimbabwe	3	0	0	3	68	146	–78	6	14	0

19 April 2016
14:00

Uruguay	34–38	Fiji

19 April 2016
16:00

Samoa	54–24	Zimbabwe

23 April 2016
10:00

Samoa	32–8	Fiji

23 April 2016
12:00

Uruguay	50–22	Zimbabwe

27 April 2016
10:00

Fiji	42–22	Zimbabwe

27 April 2016
14:00

Samoa	56–22	Uruguay

=== Pool B ===
Team	Pld	W	D	L	PF	PA	PD	TF	TA	Pts
Spain	3	3	0	0	104	46	+58	14	6	14
Namibia	3	2	0	1	138	92	+50	18	13	10
United States	3	1	0	2	92	76	+16	12	10	8
Hong Kong	3	0	0	3	28	148	–118	4	19	0

19 April 2016
10:00

United States	44–46	Namibia

19 April 2016
12:00

Spain	44–8	Hong Kong

23 April 2016
14:00

Spain	40–22	Namibia

23 April 2016
16:00

United States	32–12	Hong Kong

27 April 2016
12:00

Namibia	70–8	Hong Kong

27 April 2016
16:00

Spain	18–16	United States

== Finals ==
=== 7th place play-off ===
1 May 2016
14:00

Zimbabwe	40–44	Hong Kong

National Sports Stadium, Harare

=== 5th place play-off ===
1 May 2016
10:00

Uruguay	30–32	United States

National Sports Stadium, Harare

=== Bronze final ===
1 May 2016
12:00

Fiji	44–30	Namibia

National Sports Stadium, Harare

=== Final ===
1 May 2016
16:00

Samoa	38–32 (a.e.t.)	Spain

National Sports Stadium, Harare
