= Romania national under-20 rugby union team =

Romania
- Nickname: Stejăreii (The Little Oaks)
- Emblem: Oak leaf
- Union: Romanian Rugby Federation
- Head coach: Nicolae Mocanu
First colours	Second colours

First international
- Romania 28–26 Namibia (Stade Français, (Santiago, Chile 15 April 2008)

Biggest win
- South Korea 14–65 Romania (RFUEA Ground, Nairobi, Kenya 25 April 2009)

Biggest defeat
- Spain 70–6 Romania (Parque Pinares de Venecia, Zaragoza, Spain 8 December 2018)

The Romania national under-20 rugby union team is Romania's junior national team in rugby union. They have represented Romania in the IRB Junior World Rugby Trophy, now known as the World Rugby U20 Trophy but have not yet participate in the World Rugby U20 Championship. They participated in the first three Junior World Trophies, winning it in 2009, and in 2018 they hosted of the World Rugby U20 Trophy for the first time.

== Results in the World Rugby Under 20 Trophy ==
=== 2008 IRB Junior World Rugby Trophy ===
Pool

- Romania 28–26 Namibia
- Romania 46–7 Cook Islands
- Chile 14–3 Romania

3rd place play-off

- Romania 10–34 Georgia

=== 2009 IRB Junior World Rugby Trophy ===
Pool

- Papua New Guinea 17–50 Romania
- South Korea 14–65 Romania
- Romania 26–20 Chile

Final

- United States 13–25 Romania

=== 2010 IRB Junior World Rugby Trophy ===
Pool

- Uruguay 12–15 Romania
- Italy 30–7 Romania
- Romania 48–12 Papua New Guinea

3rd place play-off

- Romania 20–23 (aet) Russia

=== 2018 World Rugby Under 20 Trophy ===
Pool

- Namibia 55–26 Romania
- Samoa 31–17 Romania
- Romania 33–56 Hong Kong

7th place play-off

- Romania 14–71 Canada

== Players ==
=== Current squad ===
On 12 October 2023, the following 36 players were called up for the 2023 Rugby Europe Under 20s Championship.

Head coach: (Romania) Nicolae Mocanu

Player	Position	Age	Club
Petre Alexandru Popa	Hooker		(Romania) Tomitanii Constanța
Adrian Mircea Radu	Hooker		(Romania) CS Rapid
George-Cosmin Iftemi	Hooker		(Romania) CS Rapid
Marko-Ștefan Buruiană	Prop		(France) Castres Olympique
Marian Bodorin	Prop		(Romania) Tomitanii Constanța
Cristian – Josef Andrioaei	Prop		(Romania) CSU ELBI Cluj
Lukas Mitu	Prop		(France) Castres Olympique
Eduard Mocanu	Prop		(Spain) Complutense Cisneros
Răzvan Alexandru Olteanu	Prop		(Romania) CS Rapid
Alexandru Cristian	Prop		(Romania) CS Rapid
Stefan Ciocirlan	Lock		(England) Hartpury RFC
Nicolaie Ursu	Lock		(Romania) Tomitanii Constanța
Andrei Ștefan Iulian Rusu	Lock		(Romania) Steaua București
Eduard Nicolae Cioroabă	Back Row		(Romania) Dinamo București
Marius Nicolae Nazîru	Back Row		(Romania) Constanța
Mihai-Daniel Chirica	Back Row		(Romania) Constanța
Mihnea Călin Miru	Back Row		(Romania) CS Rapid
Petronel Arariței	Back Row		(Romania) CS Politehnica Iași
Andrei-Ionuț Schutz	Back Row		(Romania) Baia Mare
Alexandru Sava	Scrum-half		(Romania) Constanța
Robert Petrișor Ionașcu	Scrum-half		(Romania) Dinamo București
Cristian-Andrei Nedelcu	Scrum-half		(Romania) Steaua București
Ionuț-Alexandru Sava	Fly-half		(Romania) Constanța
Ioan Ștefan Cojocariu	Fly-half		(Romania) Dinamo București
Fabian – Constantin Bunu	Fly-half		(Romania) CSU ELBI Cluj
Mihai-Paul Graure	Centre		(Romania) Dinamo București
Ștefan – Michael Borș	Centre		(Republic of Ireland) Dublin City University
Iulian Melinte	Centre		(Romania) CS Rapid
Alexandru-Ciprian Neagu	Centre		(Romania) Constanța
Liviu Cristian Stoian	Centre		(Romania) Constanța
Daniel – Andrei Neagu	Wing		(Romania) CS Rapid
Iulian Petrișor Manole	Wing		(Romania) Constanța
Răzvan Călin	Wing		(Romania) Constanța
Vali Traian Nițu	Full-back		(Romania) Dinamo București
Ștefan Nedelcu	Full-back		(Romania) CS Rapid
Toni Sebastian Maftei	Full-back		(France) Aurillac

== Coaches ==
=== Current coaching staff ===
The current coaching staff of the Romanian national team:

Name	Nationality	Role
Ovidiu Cârcei	ROU	Manager
Nicolae Mocanu	ROU	Head coach
Dănuț Dumbrăva	ROU	Assistant coach
Dr. Vlad-Constantin Ilie	ROU	Team doctor
Marin Obretin	ROU	Kinesiotherapist

== See also ==
- Rugby union in Romania
- Romania national rugby union team
- Romania national rugby sevens team
- Romania women's national rugby sevens team
