= Portugal national under-20 rugby union team =

The Portugal national under-20 rugby union team is Portugal's national junior team.

Portugal made their first Under 20 Trophy appearance at the 2013 IRB Junior World Rugby Trophy in Chile. They finished in 6th place after losing to Tonga 7 - 27 in the 5th place play-off.

In 2015 Portugal hosted the 2015 World Rugby Under 20 Trophy in Lisbon from 12-24 May.

== Under 20 Trophy ==
=== 2013 Under 20 Trophy ===
Pool A

- Portugal 6 - 18 Chile
- Portugal 26 - 17 Namibia
- Portugal 13 - 61 Italy

5th Place Play-off

- Portugal 7 - 27 Tonga

== World Rugby Under 20 Championship and Trophy ==
Junior World Championship/Trophy
| Year | Competition | Pld | Win | Draw | Loss | PF | PA | Diff | Finish |
|---|---|---|---|---|---|---|---|---|---|
| 2008 | Trophy | Did Not Qualified | | | | | | | |
| 2009 | Trophy | Did Not Qualified | | | | | | | |
| 2010 | Trophy | Did Not Qualified | | | | | | | |
| 2011 | Trophy | Did Not Qualified | | | | | | | |
| 2012 | Trophy | Did Not Qualified | | | | | | | |
| 2013 | Trophy | 4 | 1 | 0 | 3 | 52 | 123 | -71 | 6th |
| 2014 | Trophy | Did Not Qualified | | | | | | | |
| 2015 | Trophy | 4 | 1 | 0 | 3 | 103 | 114 | -11 | 7th |
| 2016 | Trophy | Did Not Qualified | | | | | | | |
| 2017 | Trophy | 4 | 3 | 0 | 1 | 70 | 69 | +1 | 2nd |
| 2018 | Trophy | 4 | 3 | 0 | 1 | 146 | 112 | +34 | 3rd |
| 2019 | Trophy | 4 | 3 | 0 | 1 | 183 | 85 | +68 | 2nd |
| 2023 | Trophy | Did Not Qualified | | | | | | | |
| 2024 | Trophy | Did Not Qualified | | | | | | | |
