= 2012 IRB Junior World Rugby Trophy =

Tournament details
- Host nation: USA
- Venue: Murray Rugby Park Stadium; Salt Lake City, Utah
- Dates: June 18 – June 30
- No. of nations: 8

Final positions
- Champions: United States
- Runner-up: Japan

Tournament statistics
- Matches played: 16
- Top scorer(s): (United States) Madison Hughes (72)
- Most tries: (Tonga) Hosea Saumaki (7)

The 2012 IRB Junior World Rugby Trophy was the fifth annual international rugby union competition for Under 20 national teams, second-tier world championship. The winner of the competition, the United States, was promoted to the IRB Junior World Championship for the 2013 tournament.

The event was held in the USA from 18 June until 30 June by rugby's governing body, the International Rugby Board. All matches took place at the Murray Rugby Park Stadium in Salt Lake City, Utah. Attendance was strong for the tournament, with all four match days resulting in packed crowds filling Murray Rugby Park Stadium. All matches in the tournament were streamed live by Deseret News and KSL, with more than 70,000 users logging on to view the official stream. The 2012 JWRT landed several commercial sponsors, including Gatorade, Gilbert, and World Rugby Shop.

== Pool stage ==
All times are in Mountain Daylight Time (UTC−6).

=== Pool A ===
Team	Pld	W	D	L	PF	PA	PD	BP	Pts
United States	3	3	0	0	112	49	+63	2	14
Tonga	3	2	0	1	114	43	+71	2	10
Chile	3	1	0	2	92	114	−22	1	5
Russia	3	0	0	3	39	151	−112	0	0

18 June 2012
14:00

Chile	53 – 19	Russia

Murray Rugby Park Stadium, Salt Lake City

18 June 2012
18:00

United States	22 – 11	Tonga
Try: Hughes 75'; Falcon 79'; Con: Hughes (0/2); Pen: Hughes (4/4)		Try: Atiola 49'; Con: Makaafi (0/1); Pen: Makaafi (2/5)

Murray Rugby Park Stadium, Salt Lake City

22 June 2012
16:00

Tonga	62 – 7	Russia

Murray Rugby Park Stadium, Salt Lake City

22 June 2012
18:00

United States	54 – 25	Chile

Murray Rugby Park Stadium, Salt Lake City

26 June 2012
16:00

Tonga	41 – 14	Chile

Murray Rugby Park Stadium, Salt Lake City

26 June 2012
18:00

United States	36 – 13	Russia

Murray Rugby Park Stadium, Salt Lake City

=== Pool B ===
Team	Pld	W	D	L	PF	PA	PD	BP	Pts
Japan	3	3	0	0	113	100	+13	3	15
Georgia	3	2	0	1	103	60	+43	3	11
Canada	3	1	0	2	118	114	+4	3	7
Zimbabwe	3	0	0	3	88	148	−60	3	3

18 June 2012
12:00

Japan	39 – 36	Zimbabwe

Murray Rugby Park Stadium, Salt Lake City

18 June 2012
16:00

Georgia	31 – 17	Canada

Murray Rugby Park Stadium, Salt Lake City

22 June 2012
12:00

Georgia	43 – 7	Zimbabwe

Murray Rugby Park Stadium, Salt Lake City

22 June 2012
14:00

Japan	38 – 35	Canada

Murray Rugby Park Stadium, Salt Lake City

26 June 2012
12:00

Canada	66 – 45	Zimbabwe

Murray Rugby Park Stadium, Salt Lake City

26 June 2012
14:00

Japan	36 – 29	Georgia

Murray Rugby Park Stadium, Salt Lake City

== Knockout stage ==
=== 7th place game ===
30 June 2012
12:00

Russia	10-22	Zimbabwe

Murray Rugby Park Stadium, Salt Lake City

=== 5th place game ===
30 June 2012
14:00

Chile	43-31	Canada

Murray Rugby Park Stadium, Salt Lake City

=== Third place game ===
30 June 2012
16:00

Tonga	31-29	Georgia

Murray Rugby Park Stadium, Salt Lake City

=== Final ===
30 June 2012
18:00

United States	37-33	Japan

Murray Rugby Park Stadium, Salt Lake City

== Leading scorers ==
- Points = Madison Hughes, USA
- Tries = Hosea Saumaki, Tonga
- Conversions = Conor McCann, Canada
- Penalties = Madison Hughes, USA
- Drop Goals = (none)
- Source
