= Russia national under-20 rugby union team =

Russia
- Union: Rugby Union of Russia
- Coach(es): Rauv Malikov
Team kit	Change kit

The Russia national under-20 rugby union team that represent Russia in Rugby union. They have qualified through to the World Rugby U20 Trophy only once in 2012 where they didn't record a single win throughout the entire tournament. After the 2022 Russian invasion of Ukraine, World Rugby and Rugby Europe suspended Russia from international and European continental rugby union competition. In addition, the Rugby Union of Russia was suspended from World Rugby and Rugby Europe.
