= Hong Kong national under-20 rugby union team =

Hong Kong
- Union: Hong Kong Rugby Football Union
- Nickname: Dragons
- Coach: Pale Tauti
Team kit	Change kit

The Hong Kong national under-20 rugby union team is Hong Kong's junior national team. The 2014 IRB Junior World Rugby Trophy was their first appearance at a national level, they placed 8th overall.

Hong Kong defeated Korea 58-7 in the 2014 Asian Under 19 Championship final to qualify for the 2015 World Rugby Under 20 Trophy in Lisbon, Portugal.

== Current squad ==
Hong Kong U20 squad to the 2015 Under 20 Trophy:

- Aiden Bradley (USRC Tigers)
- Thomas Cheung (City RFC)
- Hugo Chui (HKFC)
- Ian Chan (USRC Tigers)
- James Christie (Newcastle RFC)
- Daniel Davidson (Tigers)
- Joshua Davies (Tigers)
- Kenneth Encarnacion (Gai Wu)
- Finley Field (Edinburgh Uni)
- Kevin Field (Edinburgh Uni)
- Li Tsz Hin (Tin Shui Wai)
- Tomos Howells (Tigers)
- Calvin Hunter (Tigers)
- Eric Kwok (Tigers)
- Sjors Laurijsen (HK Scottish)
- Richard Lewis (HKFC)
- Callum McFeat-Smith (HKFC)
- John William Markley (Valley)
- Raef Morrison (co-captain, Edinburgh Uni)
- Alessandro Nardoni (HK Scottish)
- Liam Owens (Valley)
- Alexander Post (HK Cricket Club)
- Ron Siew (Tigers)
- Cameron Smith (HKFC)
- Hugo Stiles (co-captain, Valley)
- Kyle Sullivan (Tonbridge Juddians RFC)
- Cheuk Hang Tang (Tin Shui Wai)

=== Previous Squads ===
Squad to 2014 IRB Junior World Rugby Trophy

Forwards

- Zac Cinnamond
- Ryan Aylsworth
- Chris Shipman
- John Markley
- Alexander Post
- Fin Field
- Calvin Hunter
- Michael Parfitt
- Rupert Phillips
- Sebastian Brien
- Michael Coverdale
- Richard Lewis
- Chris Maize
- Raef Morrison

Backs

- James Christie
- Jack Combes
- Jason Jeyam
- Elliot Croft
- Liam Owens
- Eric Kwok
- Joseph Dignan
- Kevin Field
- Jordan Cooper
- Daniel Davidson
- Flynn Kennedy
- Hugo Stiles
- Ian Chan

Management

- Head coach:Pale Tauti
- Team manager:Paul Renouf
- Assistant coach:Craig Wilson
- Assistant coach:Kane Jury
- Physiotherapist:David Bayldon
- Team doctor:David Owens
- Trainer:Dartanian Lea
