= Pouri Rakete-Stones =

New Zealand rugby union player

- Full name: Pouri Gordon Rakete-Stones
- Born: 17 June 1997 (age 29) Auckland, New Zealand
- Height: 183 cm (6 ft 0 in)
- Weight: 123 kg (271 lb; 19 st 5 lb)
- School: Napier Boys' High School

Rugby union career
- Position: Prop
- Current team: Newcastle Red Bulls
Senior career
Years	Team	Apps	(Points)
2017–2026	Hawke's Bay	94	(60)
2020–2026	Hurricanes	61	(15)
2026–	Newcastle Red Bulls	0	(0)
- Correct as of 22 June 2026
International career
Years	Team	Apps	(Points)
2016–2017	New Zealand U20	8	(10)
2019–2026	Māori All Blacks	8	(0)
2022	All Blacks XV	2	(0)
- Correct as of 1 July 2026

Pouri Rakete-Stones (born 17 June 1997) is a New Zealand rugby player who plays as a prop for the Hurricanes in Super Rugby and Hawke's Bay in New Zealand's domestic National Provincial Championship competition.

== Early career ==
Rakete-Stones attended and played rugby for Napier Boys High School. During his two years in Napier Boys' First XV team, he played mostly at hooker, but he currently prefers playing at prop. He also played age-grade rugby for Hawke's Bay and was the inaugural winner of the Graeme Lowe award for the Hawke's Bay Rugby Academy Player of the Year in 2016.

In 2015, Rakete-Stones was named in the Hurricanes U18 team to play their Crusaders U18 counterparts.

== Senior career ==
In 2017, Rakete-Stones was - for the first time - named in the Hawke's Bay squad for the Mitre 10 Cup. He made his Magpies debut, off the bench, on 19 August 2017 against Southland. While he played his first two seasons mostly at tighthead prop, in 2018 all off the bench, he has since established himself as a regular starter at loosehead prop.

On 12 November 2019, the Hurricanes announced their squad for the 2020 Super Rugby season, which for the first time included Pouri Rakete-Stones. Rakete-Stones earned his first full contract because of his excellent form for Hawke's Bay in the Mitre 10 Cup. Particularly his ability to cover both loosehead and tighthead prop, as well as being a strong scrummager and strong ball carrier, were highlighted in the announcement. He made his Super Rugby debut on 2 February 2020 against the Stormers in Cape Town, South Africa. Just over two years later, on 5 March 2022, he scored his first Super Rugby try in a game against the Highlanders.

Rakete-Stones played seven seasons for the Hurricanes, during which he played 61 games for the franchise. He left New Zealand as a Super Rugby champion after the Hurricanes won the title at the end of the 2026 Super Rugby Pacific season.

English club Newcastle Red Bulls announced on 23 January 2026 that it had signed Rakete-Stones on a two-year contract, starting from the 2026–27 Premiership Rugby season.

== International career ==
Despite not being part of the group of players invited to attend the New Zealand Under-20 development camps that year, Rakete-Stones was named in the squad for the 2016 Oceania Rugby Under 20 Championship. He played in one of the two matches of that year's series against Australia. A year later, he was again part of the New Zealand Under-20 squad for the 2017 Oceania Rugby Under 20 Championship, which that year consisted of tests against Australia, Fiji and Samoa. He played in all three games and New Zealand retained the Oceania title.

On 8 May 2017, Rakete-Stones was named in the New Zealand Under-20 squad for the 2017 World Rugby Under 20 Championship in Georgia. He played in all New Zealand's games, except the first pool game. He scored two tries during the tournament, one of them in the record 64-17 win over England in the final. New Zealand claimed its 6th World Rugby U20 Championship title that year.

Rakete-Stones played for the New Zealand Universities team that toured Japan, in 2018.

In 2019, Rakete-Stones - who is of Ngāpuhi descent - was called into the Māori All Blacks squad for the two-test series against Fiji as an injury replacement for Ben May. He made his Māori All Blacks debut, off the bench, in the second match in Rotorua. On 5 December 2020, Rakete-Stones earned his first start for the Māori All Blacks - replacing injured Marcel Renata - in a one-off match against Moana Pasifika in Hamilton.

On 26 October 2022, after an outstanding NPC season playing for Hawke's Bay, Rakete-Stones was called into the All Blacks XV squad that was named earlier that month for two matches against Ireland A and the Barbarians during their Northern Tour. He made his debut for the side – via the bench – on 13 November 2022 against the Barbarians.

== Career honours ==
Hurricanes

- Super Rugby: 2026

Hawke's Bay

- Mitre 10 Cup Championship: 2020
