= Marino Mikaele-Tu'u =

New Zealand rugby union player (born 1997)

- Born: 6 November 1997 (age 29) Wellington, New Zealand
- Height: 192 cm (6 ft 4 in)
- Weight: 113 kg (17 st 11 lb; 249 lb)
- School: Hastings Boys' High School
- Notable relative: Liana Mikaele-Tu'u (sister)

Rugby union career
- Position(s): Number 8, Flanker
- Current team: Mitsubishi Dynaboars
Senior career
Years	Team	Apps	(Points)
2016–2023	Hawke's Bay	62	(77)
2018–2023	Highlanders	48	(30)
2023–	Mitsubishi Dynaboars	40	(65)
- Correct as of 9 June 2026
International career
Years	Team	Apps	(Points)
2016–2017	New Zealand U20	13	(5)
2022	All Blacks XV	1	(0)
- Correct as of 5 November 2022

Marino Mikaele-Tu'u (born 6 November 1997) is a New Zealand rugby union player, who currently plays as a loose forward for Mitsubishi Sagamihara DynaBoars in the Japan Rugby League One competition.

He previously played for the Highlanders in Super Rugby and Hawke's Bay in New Zealand's domestic National Provincial Championship competition.

== Early career ==
Mikaele-Tu'u was born in Wellington and moved to Hawke's Bay at the age of 11. He has a twin brother, Antonio, and a younger sister, Liana, who is a Black Fern.

Mikaele-Tu'u attended Hastings Boys' High School and was one of the standout players for their First XV team in 2014 and 2015. Mikaele-Tu'u played age-grade rugby for Hawke's Bay and also played for the Hurricanes U18 team in 2015.

== Senior career ==
In 2016, Mikaele-Tu'u was - for the first time - named in the Hawke's Bay Mitre 10 Cup squad. He made his Magpies debut, off the bench, on 20 August 2016 against Wellington. While he played only two games in his first season, he soon established himself as a regular starter for the Magpies.

Although Mikaele-Tu'u wasn't named in the Highlanders' squad for the 2018 Super Rugby season, he was soon called up as an injury replacement for James Lentjes. He made his Super Rugby debut - replacing Dan Pryor on the bench - against the Stormers on 9 March 2018.

Two months later, the Highlanders announced they had signed Mikaele-Tu'u for 2019 and 2020. He didn't get much game time in 2019 - he played only two games - but had a break-out season in 2020. He cemented himself in the Highlanders' starting line-up and was one of the form New Zealand loose-forwards in Super Rugby, that year.

Mikaele-Tu'u was again named in the Highlanders' squad for the 2021 Super Rugby season.

On 1 June 2023, the Highlanders announced on their social media that Mikaele-Tu'u would leave the franchise at the end of the 2023 Super Rugby Pacific season to play in Japan for Mitsubishi Sagamihara DynaBoars. That same day, the Japan Rugby League One club confirmed the signing. Mikaele-Tu'u played 47 Super Rugby games and scored six tries during his six seasons at the Highlanders.

Before leaving for Japan, Mikaele-Tu'u played one more season for Hawke's Bay. During the 2023 Bunnings NPC season, he helped the Magpies win back the Ranfurly Shield from Wellington in a tight game that the visitors won 20 – 18. He also helped his province reach the NPC final for the first time. That final, which Hawke's Bay narrowly lost 19 – 22 to Taranaki was his last and 62nd game for the Magpies. He played a total of eight seasons for the province during which he scored 15 tries and converted one.

Mikaele-Tu'u made his debut for Mitsubishi Sagamihara DynaBoars – from the bench – on 9 December 2023 against Hanazono Kintetsu Liners and scored his first try for the club on 17 March 2024 against Toshiba Brave Lupus.

== International career ==
In 2014, Mikaele-Tu'u was named in New Zealand Barbarians Schools' team that played matches against Australian Schools and Fiji Schools. The following year, he was named in the New Zealand Secondary Schools team for a three-match international series in Australia. He played in all three games.

Mikaele-Tu'u was named in the New Zealand Under-20 squad for the 2016 Oceania Rugby Under 20 Championship and played in both matches of that year's series against Australia. He was also part of the squad for the 2016 World Rugby Under 20 Championship in England. He played in all 5 games in a campaign that saw New Zealand finish at a disappointing 5th place.

In 2017, Mikaele-Tu'u enjoyed more success with the New Zealand Under 20 team. He was named in the squad for the 2017 Oceania Rugby Under 20 Championship, which that year consisted of tests against Australia, Fiji and Samoa. He played in two of the three games, and New Zealand retained the Oceania title.

On 8 May 2017, Mikaele-Tu'u was named in the New Zealand Under-20 squad for the 2017 World Rugby Under 20 Championship in Georgia. He played in all New Zealand's games, including the record 64–17 win over England in the final. New Zealand claimed its 6th World Rugby U20 Championship title that year.

On 5 December 2020, Mikaele-Tu'u - who is of Samoan descent - played for the Moana Pasifika team in a one-off match against the Māori All Blacks in Hamilton.

After an outstanding season playing for the Highlanders, Mikaele-Tu'u was, on 10 October 2022, named in the All Blacks XV squad for two matches against Ireland A and the Barbarians during their Northern Tour. He made his debut for the side on 4 November 2022 against Ireland A. The All Blacks XV won the game 47–19.

== Honours ==
New Zealand Under-20

- World Rugby Under 20 Championship: 2017

Hawke's Bay Magpies

- Mitre 10 Cup Championship: 2020
