= 2018 Oceania Rugby Under 20 Championship =

- Countries: Australia; Fiji; New Zealand; Tonga
- Date: 27 April – 5 May 2018
- Champions: New Zealand (4th title)
- Runners-up: Australia
- Matches played: 6

The 2018 Oceania Rugby Under 20s, was the fourth edition of the Oceania Rugby Junior Championship. Tonga played in the tournament for the first time, replacing Samoa from the previous year and joining Fiji, New Zealand and hosts Australia at Bond University on the Gold Coast.

The Oceania Championship was played over three rounds in nine days, with New Zealand defeating Australia by 43–28 in the last match of the round-robin tournament to take the title.

== Teams ==
The teams for the 2018 Oceania Rugby Under 20 tournaments were:

Championship

- Australia
- Fiji
- New Zealand
- Tonga

Trophy

- Samoa
- Tonga

== Championship ==
=== Standings ===
2018 Oceania Rugby Under 20 Championship
Team	P	W	D	L	PF	PA	PD	TB	LB	Pts
New Zealand	3	3	0	0	195	43	+152	3	0	15
Australia	3	2	0	1	170	55	+115	3	0	11
Fiji	3	1	0	2	74	106	−32	1	0	5
Tonga	3	0	0	3	7	242	−235	0	0	0
Updated: 5 May 2018 Source: rugbyarchive.net

Competition rules
Points breakdown:
4 points for a win
2 points for a draw
1 bonus point for a loss by seven points or less
1 bonus point for scoring four or more tries in a match
Classification:
Teams standings are calculated as follows:
Most log points accumulated from all matches
Most log points accumulated in matches between tied teams
Highest difference between points scored for and against accumulated from all matches
Most points scored accumulated from all matches

=== Round 1 ===
27 April	New Zealand	97–0	Tonga	Bond University, Gold Coast, Gold Coast
17:00

27 April	Australia	51–5	Fiji	Bond University, Gold Coast, Gold Coast
19:00

=== Round 2 ===
1 May	New Zealand	55–15	Fiji	Bond University, Gold Coast, Gold Coast
17:00

1 May	Australia	91–7	Tonga	Bond University, Gold Coast, Gold Coast
19:00

=== Round 3 ===
5 May	Fiji	54–0	Tonga	Bond University, Gold Coast, Gold Coast
17:00

5 May	Australia	28–43	New Zealand	Bond University, Gold Coast, Gold Coast
19:00

New Zealand
Oceania Champion
Fourth title

== Trophy ==
The Oceania Trophy was played at Lotopa, near Apia in Samoa, as a two-match series between Samoa and Tonga.

=== Standings ===
Final competition table:

#	Team	Pld	W	D	L	PF	PA	PD	Pts
1	Tonga	2	2	0	0	43	32	+ 11	8
2	Samoa	2	0	0	2	32	43	11	2
Updated: 8 December 2018 Source: Oceania Rugby

Competition rules
Points breakdown:
4 points for a win
2 points for a draw
Classification:
Teams standings are calculated as follows:
Most log points accumulated from all matches
Most log points accumulated in matches between tied teams
Highest difference between points scored for and against accumulated from all matches
Most points scored accumulated from all matches

=== Results ===
4 December	Samoa	12–16	Tonga	Marist St Joseph Park, Lotopa
		Summary

11 December	Samoa	20–27	Tonga	Marist St Joseph Park, Lotopa
		Summary

Tonga
Oceania Trophy Winner
First title

== See also ==
- 2018 World Rugby Under 20 Championship
- 2018 World Rugby Under 20 Trophy
