= 2019 Oceania Rugby Under 20 Championship =

2019 Oceania Rugby U20 Championship
Tournament details
- Host: Gold Coast, Queensland, Australia
- Venue: Bond Sports Park, Robina
- Dates: 26 April – 4 May 2019 (9 days)
- Countries: Australia; Fiji; Japan; New Zealand

Final positions
- Champions: Australia (1st title)
- Runner-up: New Zealand

Tournament statistics
- Matches played: 6
- Tries scored: 52 (8.67 per match)
- Top scorer(s): Rivez Reihana (33)
- Most tries: Takamasa Maruo (4)

2019 Oceania Rugby U20 Championship was the fifth edition of Oceania Rugby's premier youth international rugby union competition featuring Australia, Fiji, and New Zealand. The tournament, which kicked off in April, also featured Japan for the first time since the inaugural edition in 2015.

On the final match of the tournament, Australia defeated New Zealand for the second time to seal their maiden Oceania Rugby U20 Championship title.

== Background and venue ==
Gold Coast, Queensland	2019 Oceania Rugby Under 20 Championship is located in Queensland
Bond Sports Park	2019 Oceania Rugby Under 20 Championship is located in Queensland
Capacity: 2,500	2019 Oceania Rugby Under 20 Championship is located in Queensland

The tournament took place across nine days in April and May 2019. New Zealand and Australia had finished fourth and fifth respectively at the 2018 World Rugby U20 Championship, with the former going into the tournament as the defending champions. Fiji had won the 2018 World Rugby U20 Trophy for the first time.

Due to a change in scheduling there was no Oceania Rugby Under 20 Trophy contested in 2019, which was expected to have Samoa and Tonga as participants. In previous seasons the competition was held during December in the year before the World Rugby Under 20 Trophy. In 2019, however, Oceania Rugby moved these qualification matches to be played in the same year as the 2020 World Rugby Under 20 Trophy.

=== Venue ===
The venue for the tournament was Bond Sports Park in Gold Coast's Robina suburb. The ground, which holds a capacity of 2,500, is the home of the Bond University Rugby Club whom compete in the annual Queensland Premier Rugby club competition. The ground had also been used by various rugby teams for training.

== Standings ==
Pos	Team	Pld	W	D	L	PF	PA	PD	TF	TA	Pts
1	Australia (H, C)	3	3	0	0	104	14	+90	13	2	12
2	New Zealand	3	2	0	1	140	43	+97	21	4	8
3	Fiji	3	1	0	2	66	106	−40	10	14	4
4	Japan	3	0	0	3	63	210	−147	8	32	0

Source: Oceania Rugby
(C) Champion; (H) Host

== Matches ==
=== Round 1 ===
26 April 2019
15:00 AEST (UTC+10)

New Zealand	53–7	Fiji
Try: Gilbert 23' m Tupaea (2) 37' c, 68' c Finau 43' c Carter 49' m Lalomilo 60' c Klein 71' c Vaa'i 74' m Con: Burke (2/4) 38', 44'; Reihana (3/4) 61', 68', 71'; Pen: Burke (1/1) 20'	Report	Try: Rasaku 35' c Con: Kuruvoli (1/1) 35'

Bond Sports Park, Gold Coast
Referee: Dru Tonks (Australia)

26 April 2019
17:00 AEST (UTC+10)

Australia	64–14	Japan
Try: Reilly 1' c Nawaqanitawase (2) 13' c, 75' c Lolesio 20' m Wilson 25' m McReight (2) 32' c, 58' c Lonergan 38' m Robertson 45' c Tui 79' c Con: Harrison (7/10) 2', 14', 33', 45', 58', 75', 80'	Report	Try: Osada (2) 35' c, 70' c Con: Maruyama (2/2) 35', 71'

Bond Sports Park, Gold Coast
Referee: Kaveni Talemaivalagi (Fiji)

=== Round 2 ===
30 April 2019
15:00 AEST (UTC+10)

New Zealand	87–12	Japan
Try: Boshier 7' m Funaki 10' c Gregory 19' m Herbert (3) 24' c, 65' c, 80' c McLeod (2) 27' c, 46' c Fihaki 31' c Forbes 35' c Reihana 44' c Lalomilo 61' c Williams 74' c Con: Reihana (11/13) 11', 25', 28', 32', 35', 44', 47', 61', 66', 74', 80'	Report	Try: Penalty try 14'; Kawase 21' m

Bond Sports Park, Gold Coast
Referee: Kaveni Talemaivalagi (Fiji)

30 April 2019
17:00 AEST (UTC+10)

Australia	16–0	Fiji
Try: Wood 25' c Con: McDonald (1/1) 25'; Pen: McDonald (3/3) 47', 56', 74'	Report

Bond Sports Park, Gold Coast
Referee: Jordan Way (Australia)

=== Round 3 ===
4 May 2019
17:00 AEST (UTC+10)

Japan	37–59	Fiji
Try: Shoy. Maeda 7' c Maruo (4) 17' c, 24' m, 40' m, 75' c Con: Maruyama (2/3) 8', 18'; Vailea (1/1) 75'; Pen: Maruyama (1/1) 38'; Vailea (1/1) 42'	Report	Try: Vuta 10' c Droasese 13' c Miramira (2) 30' c, 35' c Waqa (2) 51' c, 57' m Rasaku 54' c Natoga 70' m Vasuinadi 77' c Con: Kuruvoli (4/4) 11', 14', 32', 36'; Muntz (3/5) 52', 55', 78'

Bond Sports Park, Gold Coast
Referee: Amy Perrett (Australia)

4 May 2019
19:00 AEST (UTC+10)

Australia	24–0	New Zealand
Try: Reilly 64' m Lolesio 71' c Con: Harrison (1/2) 71'; Pen: Harrison (4/4) 7', 14', 25', 31'	Report

Bond Sports Park, Gold Coast
Attendance: 2,136
Referee: Jordan Way (Australia)

== See also ==
- 2019 World Rugby U20 Championship
- 2019 World Rugby U20 Trophy
