= Isaia Walker-Leawere =

New Zealand rugby union player

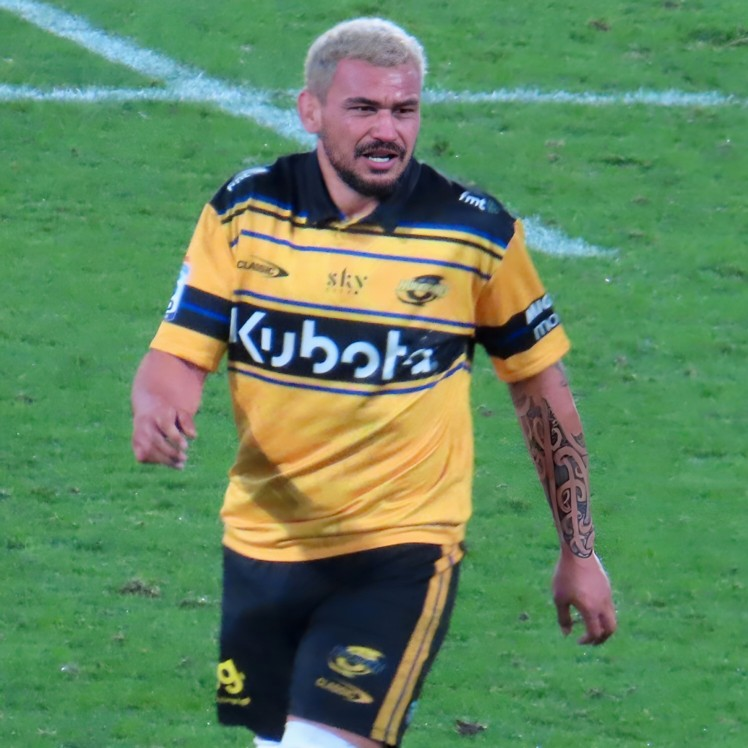
- Walker-Leawere playing for the Hurricanes in the 2026 Super Rugby Pacific final
- Born: 16 April 1997 (age 29) Ruatoria, New Zealand
- Height: 197 cm (6 ft 6 in)
- Weight: 122 kg (269 lb; 19 st 3 lb)
- School: Gisborne Boys' High School
- Notable relative: Kele Leawere (father)

Rugby union career
- Position: Lock
- Current team: Benetton
Senior career
| Years | Team | Apps | (Points) |
| 2015 | Poverty Bay | 1 | (0) |
| 2016–2018 | Wellington | 22 | (25) |
| 2018–2026 | Hurricanes | 93 | (10) |
| 2019–2025 | Hawke's Bay | 50 | (20) |
| 2026– | Benetton | 0 | (0) |
- Correct as of 1 July 2026
International career
| Years | Team | Apps | (Points) |
| 2016–2017 | New Zealand U20 | 12 | (15) |
| 2018–2025 | Māori All Blacks | 14 | (25) |
| 2024 | All Blacks XV | 2 | (0) |
- Correct as of 1 July 2026

Isaia Walker-Leawere (born 16 July 1997) is a New Zealand rugby union player who plays as a lock for Benetton in the United Rugby Championship.

He previously played for the Hurricanes in Super Rugby and Hawke's Bay in New Zealand's domestic National Provincial Championship competition. Internationally, he has played for the Māori All Blacks and All Blacks XV.

== Early life and career ==
Walker-Leawere hails from Ruatoria, in the Gisborne Region in the northeastern corner of New Zealand's North Island. He's the son of Kele Leawere, who played as a lock for Fiji.

He attended and played First XV rugby for Gisborne Boys' High School. In 2014 and 2015, he played for the Hurricanes U18 team.

As an 18-year-old, Walker-Leawere played one game for Poverty Bay in the Heartland Championship (on 29 August 2015 against Thames Valley).

== Senior career ==
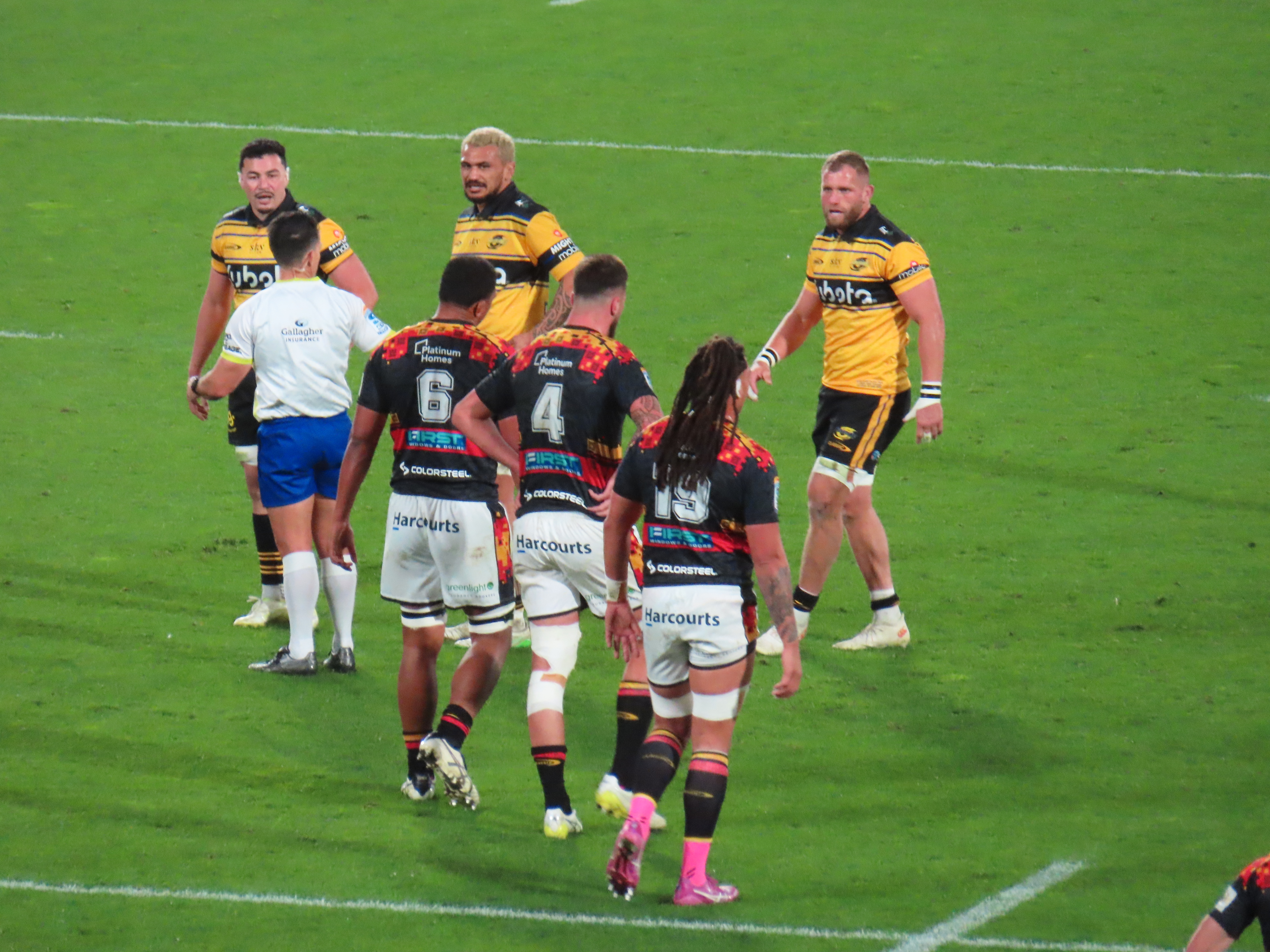
Walker-Leawere playing for the Hurricanes in the 2026 Super Rugby Pacific final, alongside Brayden Iose and Brad Shields.

In 2016, Walker-Leawere moved to Wellington after being contracted by the Wellington Rugby Football Union. Before he had even played a single game of Mitre 10 Cup for the Lions, he was called into the Hurricanes wider training squad for the final weeks of the 2016 Super Rugby season.

On 11 August 2016, Walker-Leawere was named in the Wellington Lions squad. He made his Mitre 10 Cup debut against Hawke's Bay, nine days later. He went on to play three seasons for Wellington.

The Hawke's Bay Rugby Union announced on 7 June 2019 that Walker-Leawere had signed a three-year contract to play his provincial rugby for Hawke's Bay. He made his Magpies debut against Manawatu on 11 August 2019.

Meanwhile, in November 2017, the Hurricanes announced that Walker-Leawere had signed a two-year deal with the franchise, and named him in their squad for the 2018 Super Rugby season. He missed the first part of the season as he was initially recovering from shoulder reconstruction surgery and then suffered a knee injury. He made his Super Rugby debut for the Hurricanes against the Brumbies, on 30 June 2018. He has since re-signed with the Hurricanes multiple time, most recently recommitting to the franchise until the end of the 2026 season.

Walker-Leawere played nine seasons for the Hurricanes, during which he played 93 games for the franchise. He left New Zealand as a Super Rugby champion after the Hurricanes won the title at the end of the 2026 Super Rugby Pacific season.

Italian club Benetton Rugby announced on 10 March 2026 that it had signed Walker-Leawere for the 2026–27 United Rugby Championship season, with the option to extend for another season.

== International career ==
In 2014, Walker-Leawere was named in the New Zealand Barbarians Schools' team that played matches against Australian Schools and Fiji Schools. The following year, he was named in the New Zealand Secondary Schools team for a three-match international series in Australia. He started in all three games and scored two tries.

On 10 May 2016, Walker-Leawere was named in the New Zealand Under-20 squad for the 2016 World Rugby Under 20 Championship in England. He played all 5 games in a campaign that saw New Zealand finish at a disappointing 5th place.

In 2017, he enjoyed more success with the New Zealand Under 20 team. He was named in the squad for the 2017 Oceania Rugby Under 20 Championship, which that year consisted of tests against Australia, Fiji and Samoa. He played in two of the three games, and New Zealand retained the Oceania title.

On 8 May 2017, Walker-Leawere was named in the New Zealand Under-20 squad for the 2017 World Rugby Under 20 Championship in Georgia. He played in all New Zealand's games and scored a try in the record 64-17 win over England in the final. New Zealand claimed its 6th World Rugby U20 Championship title that year.

In 2018, Walker-Leawere - who is of Ngāti Porou descent - was a member of the Māori All Blacks squad that toured the United States, Brazil and Chile. He made his Māori All Blacks debut on 3 November 2018 against the USA and scored two tries in that game. In July 2019, he was named in the squad again for a two-test series against Fiji. On 5 December 2020, he played for the Māori All Blacks in a one-off match against Moana Pasifika in Hamilton.

Having trained with the All Blacks a few months prior after being called up as injury cover for Patrick Tuipulotu, Walker-Leawere was on 8 October 2024 named in the All Blacks XV squad for two matches against Munster and Georgia. He made his debut for the team on 2 November 2024 in the game against Munster, which ended in a 38–14 victory to the All Blacks XV.

== Career honours ==
Hurricanes

- Super Rugby: 2026

Hawke's Bay

- Mitre 10 Cup Championship: 2020
