= 2015 Oceania Rugby Under 20 Championship =

- Countries: Australia; Japan; New Zealand; Samoa
- Date: 1–9 May 2015
- Champions: New Zealand (1st title)
- Runners-up: Australia

The 2015 Oceania Rugby Under 20s, was the first edition of the Oceania Rugby Junior Championship. It was played as two tournaments; the Oceania Under 20 Championship hosted on the Gold Coast in Australia, and the Oceania Under 20 Trophy hosted in Suva, Fiji.

The Championship tournament was played in May and won by New Zealand, who defeated Australia by 46–29 in the last match of the round-robin competition. A planned tournament for a further six national under 20 sides was postponed, however the Trophy competition was eventually played in December and won by Fiji, who defeated Tonga by 19–10 in the last round to qualify for the World Rugby U20 Trophy in 2016.

== Teams ==
The teams for the 2015 Oceania Rugby Under 20 tournaments were:

Championship

- Australia
- Japan
- New Zealand
- Samoa

Trophy

- Fiji
- Papua New Guinea
- Tonga
- Vanuatu

== Championship ==
=== Standings ===
Final competition table:

Team	Pld	W	D	L	PF	PA	PD	Pts
New Zealand	3	3	0	0	157	43	+114	12
Australia	3	2	0	1	109	87	+22	8
Samoa	3	1	0	2	57	99	−42	4
Japan	3	0	0	3	61	155	−94	0
Updated: 9 May 2015 Source: oceaniarugby.com

Competition rules
Points breakdown:
4 points for a win
2 points for a draw

Classification:
Teams standings are calculated as follows:
Most log points accumulated from all matches
Most log points accumulated in matches between tied teams
Highest difference between points scored for and against accumulated from all matches
Most points scored accumulated from all matches

Due to stormy weather conditions the first round matches were postponed by 24 hours.

=== Round 1 ===
2 May 2015	New Zealand	75–0	Japan	Bond University, Gold Coast
13:00	Try: Karpik (3), Wainui (2), Dunshea (2), Faiane, Tavae-aso, Lualala, Hunt; Con: Black (10/11)	Report; Summary

Team details

New Zealand
FB	15	Luteru Laulala
RW	14	Vincent Tavae-Aso
OC	13	Joshua Goodhue
IC	12	Tinoai Faiane
LW	11	Sean Wainui
FH	10	Otere Black
SH	9	Hohepa Tahuriorangi
N8	8	Blake Gibson
OF	7	Mitchell Karpik
BF	6	Mitchell Jacobson
RL	5	Hamish Dalzell
LL	4	Geoffrey Cridge
TP	3	Atunaisa Moli (c)
HK	2	Leni Apisai
LP	1	Thomas Hill
Replacements:
R	16	Liam Polwart
R	17	John Riccitelli
R	18	Isileli Tu'ungafasi
R	19	Mitchell Dunshea
R	20	Teariki Ben-Nicholas
R	21	Luke Campbell
R	22	Anton Lienert-Brown
R	23	Mitchell Hunt

Japan
FB	15	Ryuji Noguchi
RW	14	Seiya Ozaki
OC	13	Kaisei Kasahara
IC	12	Ataata Moeakiola
LW	11	Hirofumi Higashikawa
FH	10	Taisetsu Kanai
SH	9	Daiki Nakajima
N8	8	Faulua Makisi
OF	7	Kosuke Urabe
BF	6	Hiroto Kato
RL	5	Tevita Malaefo’ou Tatafu
LL	4	Mitsuru Furukawa
TP	3	Tatsuya Kakimoto
HK	2	Kosuke Horikoshi (c)
LP	1	Shogo Miura
Replacements:
HK	16	Ryosuke Iwaihara
PR	17	Ryoma Kuhara
LK	18	Yuma Fujino
N8	19	Rinpei Sasaki
SH	20	Go Maeda
FH	21	Akira Takenaka
CE	22	Yusuke Kajimura
R	23	Toshiki Kuwayama

2 May 2015	Australia	33–10	Samoa	Bond University, Gold Coast
15:00	Try: Yassmin (2), Wilkin, Fakosilea; Con: Deegan (2/4); Pen: Deegan (3/3)	Report; Summary	Try: Winterstein, Tuimalealiifano; Con: Ioane (0/2)

Team details

Australia
FB	15	Alex Newsome
RW	14	Christian Yassmin
OC	13	Andrew Kellaway (c)
IC	12	Duncan Paia'aua
LW	11	Jack Redden
FH	10	Andrew Deegan
SH	9	James Tuttle
N8	8	Lolo Fakaosilea
OF	7	Michael Gunn
BF	6	Bradley Wilkin
RL	5	Riley Winter
LL	4	Ned Hanigan
TP	3	Tyrel Lomax
HK	2	Connal McInerney
LP	1	Cameron Orr
Replacements:
R	16	Folau Faingaa
R	17	Aaron Pleash
R	18	Fereti Saaga
R	19	Lukhan Lealaiauloto-Tui
R	20	Oliver Kamp
R	21	Harry Nucifora
R	22	James Dalgleish
R	23	Tyson Davis

Samoa
FB	15	Chase Tiatia
RW	14	Ah-Mu Tuimalealiifano
OC	13	Pepesana Patafilo
IC	12	Tagaloa Fonoti
LW	11	Trent Winterstein
FH	10	Josh Ioane
SH	9	Jonathan Taumateine
N8	8	Jordan Jackett
OF	7	Uini Fetalaiga
BF	6	Josh Dowsing (c)
RL	5	Ben Tuiomanufili
LL	4	Mikaele Tapili
TP	3	Mike Tamoaieta
HK	2	Elia Elia
LP	1	Jarred Adams
Replacements:
R	16	Junior Halafuka
R	17	Marco Fepulea'i
R	18	Romero Tagi
R	19	Potu Leavasa
R	20	Gordon Langkilde
R	21	Melani Matavao
R	22	Johnny Samuelu
R	23	Kome Samau

=== Round 2 ===
5 May 2015	Samoa	14–36	New Zealand	Bond University, Gold Coast
13:00	Try: Fepulea'i, Fetalainga; Con: Falaniko (2/2)	Report; Summary	Try: Hunt (2), Smith, Lienert-Brown, Goosen, Cridge; Con: Smith (2/4), Hunt (1/1); Cards: Lienert-Brown (yellow card) 67' to 77'

Team details

Samoa
FB	15	Jonathan Taumateine
RW	14	Johnny Samuelu
OC	13	Trent Winterstein
IC	12	Nathan Lilomaiava
LW	11	Malu Falaniko
FH	10	Josh Ioane (c)
SH	9	Leota Sam-Baker
N8	8	Jordan Jackett
OF	7	Gordon Langkilde
BF	6	Uini Fetalaiga
RL	5	Ben Tuiomanufili
LL	4	Siatua Solaese
TP	3	Marco Fepulea'i
HK	2	Romero Tagi
LP	1	Junior Halafuka
Replacements:
R	16	Meki Fareni
R	17	Jarred Adams
R	18	Mike Tamoaieta
R	19	Mikaele Tapili
R	20	Jamason Faanunu-Schultz
R	21	Tagaloa Fonoti
R	22	Pepesana Patafilo
R	23	Kome Samau

New Zealand
FB	15	George Bridge
RW	14	Wesley Goosen
OC	13	Anton Lienert-Brown (c)
IC	12	Faase'e Faauli
LW	11	Nathaniel Apa
FH	10	Fletcher Smith
SH	9	Luke Campbell
N8	8	Teariki Ben-Nicholas
OF	7	Dillon Hunt
BF	6	Mitchell Dunshea
RL	5	Jamie Lane
LL	4	Joshua Goodhue
TP	3	Taukiha' Amea Koloamatangi
HK	2	Liam Polwart
LP	1	John Riccitelli
Replacements:
R	16	Steven Misa
R	17	Thomas Hill
R	18	Atunaisa Moli
R	19	Geoffrey Cridge
R	20	Mitchell Jacobson
R	21	Hohepa Tahuriorangi
R	22	Mitchell Hunt
R	23	Sean Wainui

5 May 2015	Japan	31–47	Australia	Bond University, Gold Coast
15:00	Try: Tatafu (2), Makisi, Urabe; Con: Noguchi (3/3), Kanai (1/1); Pen: Noguchi (1/1)	Report; Summary	Try: Lealaiauloto-Tui (2), Nucifora, Reddan, Newsome; Con: Deegan (3/3), Dalgleish (2/2); Pen: Dalgleish (3/3), Deegan (1/2)

Team details

Japan
FB	15	Ryuji Noguchi
RW	14	Seiya Ozaki (c)
OC	13	Kaisei Kasahara
IC	12	Yusuke Kajimura
LW	11	Hirofumi Higashikawa
FH	10	Taisetsu Kanai
SH	9	Ryuji Yonemura
N8	8	Tevita Malaefoou Tatafu
OF	7	Kosuke Urabe
BF	6	Faulua Makisi
RL	5	Mitsuru Yoshikawa
LL	4	Hiroto Kato
TP	3	Tatsuya Kakimoto
HK	2	Sung Ho Park
LP	1	Shogo Miura
Replacements:
R	16	Ryosuke Iwaihara
R	17	Ryoma Kuhara
R	18	Yuma Fujino
R	19	Rinpei Sasaki
R	20	Go Maeda
R	21	Akira Takenaka
R	22	Toshiki Kuwayama
R	23	Tatsuhiro Ozaki

Australia
FB	15	Tyson Davis
RW	14	Christian Yassmin
OC	13	Alex Newsome
IC	12	Jack Redden
LW	11	Joey Fittock
FH	10	James Dalgleish (c)
SH	9	Harry Nucifora
N8	8	Hayden Anderson
OF	7	Oliver Kamp
BF	6	Samuel Croke
RL	5	Lukhan Lealaiauloto-Tui
LL	4	Harrison Williams
TP	3	Fereti Saaga
HK	2	Folau Faingaa
LP	1	Aaron Pleash
Replacements:
R	16	Connal McInerney
R	17	Cameron Orr
R	18	Tyrel Lomax
R	19	Riley Winter
R	20	Jack McCalman
R	21	James Tuttle
R	22	Andrew Deegan
R	23	Andrew Kellaway

=== Round 3 ===
9 May 2015	Samoa	33–30	Japan	Bond University, Gold Coast
13:00	Try: Tiuiomanufili, Dowsing, Jackett, Falaniko; Con: Falaniko (2); Pen: Ioane (2), Falaniko (1)	Report; Summary	Try: Tatfu, Horikoshi, Higashikawa, Hirofumi; Con: Noguchi (2); Pen: Noguchi (2)

9 May 2015	Australia	29–46	New Zealand	Bond University, Gold Coast
15:00	Try: Fittock, Paia'aua, Croke, McCalman; Con: Deegan (3/4); Pen: Deegan (1)	Report; Summary	Try: Gibson (2), Hunt, Faiane, Lienert-Brown, Tavae-Aso, Koloamatangi; Con: Hunt (4/7); Pen: Hunt (1)

New Zealand
Oceania Champion
First title

== Trophy ==
=== Standings ===
Final competition table:

Team	Pld	W	D	L	PF	PA	PD	Pts
Fiji	3	3	0	0	191	16	+175	12
Tonga	3	2	0	1	146	35	+111	8
Papua New Guinea	3	1	0	2	96	125	−29	4
Vanuatu	3	0	0	3	13	270	−257	0
Updated: 5 December 2015 Source: oceaniarugby.com

Competition rules
Points breakdown:
4 points for a win
2 points for a draw

Classification:
Teams standings are calculated as follows:
Most log points accumulated from all matches
Most log points accumulated in matches between tied teams
Highest difference between points scored for and against accumulated from all matches
Most points scored accumulated from all matches

Fiji
Oceania Trophy Winner
First title

== See also ==
- 2015 World Rugby Under 20 Championship
- 2015 World Rugby Under 20 Trophy
