= 2012 IRB Junior World Championship =

Tournament details
- Host: South Africa
- Date: 4–22 June 2012
- Teams: 12

Final positions
- Champions: South Africa
- Runner-up: New Zealand
- Third place: Wales

Tournament statistics
- Matches played: 30

The 2012 IRB Junior World Championship was the fifth IRB Junior World Championship, an annual international rugby union competition for Under-20 national teams. This competition replaced the now defunct Under 19 and Under 21 world championships. The event was held in South Africa between 4 and 22 June 2012 and organised by world rugby's governing body, the International Rugby Board (IRB). A total of 12 nations played in the tournament. New Zealand came into the tournament as defending champions. South Africa were crowned 2012 champions after defeating New Zealand 22–16 in the final on 22 June at Newlands Stadium.

After finishing last at the 2011 IRB Junior World Championship, Tonga had been relegated to the IRB Junior World Trophy and therefore did not participate in this year's event. They had been replaced with Samoa, who won the 2011 IRB Junior World Rugby Trophy. Italy were relegated to the IRB Junior World Trophy for 2013 after losing the last place play-off to Fiji. They were replaced in 2013 with the United States, winner of the 2012 IRB Junior World Rugby Trophy.

== Venues ==
The championship was held in Cape Town, South Africa. In an effort to improve TV broadcasting for all matches, only two venues were planned to be used. However, on 8 June 2012, organizers moved all the matches that were scheduled to be played at the Danie Craven Stadium in Stellenbosch to the Cape Town Stadium in Green Point and Newlands Stadium in Newlands due to heavy rain that damaged the pitches of the initial venue.

Suburb	Venue	Capacity
Stellenbosch	Danie Craven Stadium	16,000
Bellville	University of the Western Cape Stadium	2,500
Green Point	Cape Town Stadium	55,000
Newlands	Newlands Stadium	51,900

== Teams ==
Pool	Team	Number of tournaments	Position last year	Position this year	Notes
A	New Zealand	4	1	2	Runners-up
A	Fiji	4	6	11	
A	Wales	4	7	3	Bronze medal winner
A	Samoa	3	DNP	10	Promoted from 2011 IRB Junior World Rugby Trophy
B	England	4	2	7	
B	South Africa	4	5	1	Champions
B	Ireland	4	8	5	
B	Italy	3	11	12	Relegated to 2013 IRB Junior World Rugby Trophy
C	Australia	4	3	8	
C	France	4	4	6	
C	Argentina	4	9	4	
C	Scotland	4	10	9	

== Pool stage ==
All times are in South African Standard Time (UTC+2).

=== Pool A ===
Team	Pld	W	D	L	TF	PF	PA	PD	BP	Pts
Wales	3	3	0	0	11	127	27	+100	2	14
New Zealand	3	2	0	1	15	102	21	+81	3	11
Fiji	3	1	0	2	7	45	80	-35	0	4
Samoa	3	0	0	3	0	6	152	-146	0	0

4 June 2012
14:45

Wales	44–18	Fiji
Try: D. Thomas 44' m E. Walker 47' c D. Harris 66' c C. Allen 68' c M. Morgan 71' c C. Hill 80' m Con: S. Davies (1/2) 48'; M. Morgan (3/4) 67', 68', 72'; Pen: S. Davies (2/3) 2', 54'	Report	Try: S. Kerevi 14' m J. Kerevi 25' c Con: S. Gavidi (1/1) 26'; Pen: T. Vuibau (2/3) 63', 75'

Danie Craven Stadium, Stellenbosch
Referee: Glen Jackson (New Zealand)

4 June 2012
16:45

New Zealand	63–0	Samoa
Try: A. Curtis (2) 12' c, 68' m M. Keresoma (3) 16' m, 23' c, 77' c R. Marshall 21' c M. McKenzie (2) 35' c, 61' m N. Ross 51' m N. Harris 80' m Con: I. West (4/7) 13', 22', 24', 36'; S. Eade (1/3) 78'; Pen: I. West (1/1) 4'	Report

Danie Craven Stadium, Stellenbosch
Referee: Mathieu Raynal (France)

8 June 2012
14:45

Fiji	15–3	Samoa
Try: A. Simolo 13' m S. Kerevi (2) 69' m, 78' m	Report	Pen: F. Ah Ki (1/1) 30'

University of the Western Cape Stadium, Bellville
Referee: Francisco Pastrana (Argentina)

8 June 2012
16:45

New Zealand	6–9	Wales
Pen: S. Eade (2/2) 8', 40'	Report	Pen: M. Morgan (1/2) 21'; T. Prydie (2/2) 46', 64'

Danie Craven Stadium, Stellenbosch
Referee: Angus Gardner (Australia)

12 June 2012
16:45

Wales	74–3	Samoa
Try: E. Walker 5' m M. Morgan 18' c T. Prydie (2) 24' m, 54' c R. Jones 31' m C. Allen 45' c T. Pascoe 48' c E. Jenkins 64' c G. Thomas 74' c I. Jones 77' c D. Harris 79' c Con: T. Prydie (8/11) 19', 46', 49', 55', 65', 75', 78', 80'; Pen: T. Prydie (1/1) 14'	Report	Pen: F. Ah Ki (1/1) 11'

University of the Western Cape Stadium, Bellville
Referee: Mathieu Raynal (France)

12 June 2012
18:45

New Zealand	33–12	Fiji
Try: Penalty try 36' c G. Preston 44' c M. Proctor 49' c J. Emery (2) 65' c, 80' m Con: I. West (4/5) 37', 45', 50', 66'	Report	Try: J. Sassen 2' m A. Simolo 68' c Con: S. Gavidi (1/1) 69'

University of the Western Cape Stadium, Bellville
Referee: JP Doyle (England)

=== Pool B ===
Team	Pld	W	D	L	TF	PF	PA	PD	BP	Pts
South Africa	3	2	0	1	13	99	41	+58	3	11
Ireland	3	2	0	1	10	79	51	+28	2	10
England	3	2	0	1	11	99	48	+51	1	9
Italy	3	0	0	3	2	20	157	-137	0	0

4 June 2012
16:45

England	64–5	Italy
Try: J. Bassett 15' m M. Yarde (2) 29' c, 78' c D. Robson 38' c L. Cowan-Dickie 45' c K. Sinckler 62' c R. Mills 65' c T. Heathcote 68' c S. Hill 76' c Con: H. Slade (4/4) 5', 30', 39', 46'; T. Heathcote (4/5) 63', 66', 69', 78'; Pen: H. Slade (1/1) 16'	Report	Try: L. Sarto 10' c

University of the Western Cape Stadium, Bellville
Referee: Francisco Pastrana (Argentina)

4 June 2012
18:45

South Africa	19–23	Ireland
Try: P. Willemse 53' c Con: T. Jantjies (1/1) 54'; Pen: T. Jantjies (4/4) 10', 60', 64', 71'	Report	Try: J. Coghlan 27' c C. Gilsenan 66' c Con: JJ Hanrahan (2/2) 28', 67'; Pen: JJ Hanrahan (2/2) 21', 24'; Drop: JJ Hanrahan (1/1) 57'

Danie Craven Stadium, Stellenbosch
Referee: Leighton Hodges (Wales)

8 June 2012
18:45

South Africa	52–3	Italy
Try: W. Small-Smith 15' m P. Willemse 20' c J. Serfontein (2) 27' c, 58' c S. Kitshoff 38' m V. van der Watt 52' c B. Steyn 62' c P. Howard 80+1' c Con: H. Pollard (5/6) 21', 28', 53', 59', 63'; T. Jantjies (1/2) 80+2'	Report	Pen: J. Apperley (1/2) 30'

University of the Western Cape Stadium, Bellville
Referee: Mathieu Raynal (France)

8 June 2012
18:45

England	20–15	Ireland
Try: Penalty try 61' c K. Sinckler 66' c Con: T. Heathcote (2/2) 61', 67'; Pen: T. Heathcore (2/2) 4', 43'	Report	Try: JJ Hanrahan 13' c K. Marmion 25' m Con: JJ Hanrahan (1/2) 14'; Pen: JJ Hanrahan (1/1) 39'

Danie Craven Stadium, Stellenbosch
Referee: Lourens van der Merwe (South Africa)

12 June 2012
14:45

Ireland	41–12	Italy
Try: P. Nelson (2) 1' c, 65' m C. Farrell 5' c A. Conneely 7' c J. Rael 51' m L. McGrath 55' c Con: J. Carty (4/6) 2', 6', 8', 56'; Pen: J. Carty (1/1) 20'	Report	Try: E. Padovani 12' c G. Calabrese 17' m Con: E. Padovani (1/2) 13'

Cape Town Stadium, Green Point
Referee: Angus Gardner (Australia)

12 June 2012
18:45

South Africa	28–15	England
Try: W. Small-Smith 42' c S. Adendorff (2) 47' c, 68' c P.-S. du Toit 60' c Con: H. Pollard (4/4) 43', 48', 61', 69'	Report	Pen: T. Bell (5/5) 32', 45', 57', 68', 74'

Cape Town Stadium, Green Point
Referee: Glen Jackson (New Zealand)

=== Pool C ===
Team	Pld	W	D	L	TF	PF	PA	PD	BP	Pts
Argentina	3	3	0	0	7	50	30	+20	0	12
France	3	2	0	1	8	76	54	+22	3	11
Australia	3	1	0	2	12	77	58	+19	1	5
Scotland	3	0	0	3	7	53	114	-61	2	2

4 June 2012
14:45

Australia	67–12	Scotland
Try: J. Holloway 1' m N. Frisby 4' c H. Roach (2) 13' m, 43' c J. Dargaville 17' c A. Latunipulu 26' m C. Sautia (2) 31' c, 47' m C. Browning 63' c S. Latu 65' c M. Ngauamo 74' m Con: K. Godwin (4/8) 5', 18', 32', 44'; U. Seuteni (2/3) 64', 65'	Report	Try: A. Redmayne 38' m J. Farndale 55' c Con: L. Coutts (1/2) 56'

University of the Western Cape Stadium, Bellville
Attendance: 2,000
Referee: Lourens van der Merwe (South Africa)

4 June 2012
18:45

France	15–18	Argentina
Pen: E. Escande (5/5) 4', 12', 19', 27', 28'	Report	Try: L. Ramella 22' m J. Cappiello 54' c Con: S. Poet (1/2) 55'; Pen: S. Poet (2/4) 62', 67'

University of the Western Cape Stadium, Bellville
Referee: Greg Garner (England)

8 June 2012
14:45

Australia	3–15	Argentina
Pen: K. Godwin (1/3) 37'	Report	Try: F. Nougues 26' c P. Matera 76' m Con: S. Poet (1/1) 27'; Pen: S. Poet (1/4) 34'

Danie Craven Stadium, Stellenbosch
Referee: Glen Jackson (New Zealand)

8 June 2012
16:45

France	30–29	Scotland
Try: G. Fickou (2) 2' c, 28' m J. Kazubek 55' c S. Taofifenua 77' m Con: C. Otazo (1/2) 3'; E. Selponi (1/2) 57'; Pen: E. Selponi (2/2) 37', 46'	Report	Try: Penalty try 39' c H. Leonard 64' m J. Farndale 72' m Con: H. Leonard (1/3) 39'; Pen: H. Leonard (4/4) 12', 20', 34', 59'

University of the Western Cape Stadium, Bellville
Referee: JP Doyle (England)

12 June 2012
14:45

Argentina	17–12	Scotland
Try: F. Ezcurra (2) 16' m, 26' c L. Ramella 41' m Con: J. Paz (1/3) 27'	Report	Try: J. Bhatti 15' m M. Eadie 80' c Con: H. Leonard (1/2) 80+1'

University of the Western Cape Stadium, Bellville
Referee: Leighton Hodges (Wales)

12 June 2012
16:45

France	31–7	Australia
Try: B. Fuster (2) 15' c, 20' c V. Martin 59' c P. Jedrasiak 79' c Con: E. Escande (3/3) 16', 21', 60'; T. Laranjeira (1/1) 80'; Pen: E. Escande (1/2) 66'	Report	Try: L. Gill 34' c Con: K. Godwin (1/1) 35'

Cape Town Stadium, Green Point
Referee: Greg Garner (England)

=== Standings after the group stage ===
Overall Standings
Pos	Team	Pld	W	D	L	TF	PF	PA	PD	BP	Pts
1	Wales	3	3	0	0	17	127	27	+100	2	14
2	Argentina	3	3	0	0	7	50	30	+20	0	12
3	South Africa	3	2	0	1	13	99	41	+59	3	11
4	New Zealand	3	2	0	1	15	102	21	+81	3	11
5	France	3	2	0	1	8	76	54	+22	3	11
6	Ireland	3	2	0	1	10	79	51	+28	2	10
7	England	3	2	0	1	11	99	48	+51	1	9
8	Australia	3	1	0	2	12	77	58	+19	1	5
9	Fiji	3	1	0	2	7	45	80	−35	0	4
10	Scotland	3	0	0	3	7	53	114	−61	2	2
11	Italy	3	0	0	3	3	20	157	−137	0	0
12	Samoa	3	0	0	3	0	6	152	−146	0	0

== Knockout stage ==
=== 9–12th place play-offs ===
Semi-finals
17 June – Bellville
Scotland	34
Italy	17
17 June – Bellville
Fiji	20
Samoa	29

9th place
22 June – Bellville
Scotland	62
Samoa	28
11th place
22 June – Bellville
Italy	17
Fiji	19

==== Semi-finals ====
17 June 2012
12:30

Scotland	34–17	Italy
Try: M. Eadie (2) 14' c, 45' m J. Farndale (2) 19' m, 60' c F. Russell 32' c Con: H. Leonard (3/5) 15', 32', 61'; Pen: H. Leonard (1/3) 51'	Report	Try: G. Bisegni 26' c D. Odiete 54' c Con: J. Apperley (2/2) 27', 55'; Drop: J. Apperley (1/1) 3'

University of the Western Cape Stadium, Bellville
Attendance: 500
Referee: Francisco Pastrana (Argentina)

17 June 2012
14:45

Fiji	20–29	Samoa
Try: A. Simolo 26' c L. Ratumuri 50' m J. Raikabula 77' m Con: M. Little (1/1) 27'; Pen: M. Little (1/1) 6'	Report	Try: R. Lilomaiava 33' c P. Schuster 39' c U. Poliko 41' c F. Ah Ki 53' m Con: F. Ah Ki (3/4) 34', 40', 42'; Pen: F. Ah Ki 67'

University of the Western Cape Stadium, Bellville
Attendance: 300
Referee: Angus Gardner (Australia)

==== 11th place game ====
22 June 2012
14:15

Italy	17–19	Fiji
	Report

University of the Western Cape Stadium, Bellville
Referee: Leighton Hodges (Wales)

==== 9th place game ====
22 June 2012
12:00

Scotland	62–28	Samoa
	Report

University of the Western Cape Stadium, Bellville
Referee: Angus Gardner (Australia)

=== 5–8th place play-offs ===
Semi-finals
17 June – Bellville
Ireland	27
England	12
17 June – Newlands
France	19
Australia	17

5th place
22 June – Newlands
France	7
Ireland	18
7th place
22 June – Bellville
Australia	13
England	17

==== Semi-finals ====
17 June 2012
14:45

France	19–17	Australia
Try: J. C. Fidinde 67' c Con: E. Escande (1/1) 68'; Pen: E. Escande (3/4) 12', 18', 23'; Drop: T. Laranjeira (1/1) 73'	Report	Try: L. Crook 57' c N. Frisby 68' c Con: Matt Lucas (2/2) 58', 69'; Pen: Matt Lucas (1/2) 56'

Newlands Stadium, Newlands
Referee: JP Doyle (England)

17 June 2012
17:00

Ireland	27–12	England
Try: B. Daly 7' c I. Henderson 16' c J. Coghlan 72' c Con: JJ Hanrahan (3/3) 8', 17', 73'; Pen: JJ Hanrahan (2/3) 33', 56'	Report	Try: C. Walker 42' m H. Slade 76' c Con: H. Slade (1/2) 77'

University of the Western Cape Stadium, Bellville
Referee: Leighton Hodges (Wales)

==== 7th place game ====
22 June 2012
16:30

Australia	13–17	England
	Report

University of the Western Cape Stadium, Bellville
Attendance: 550
Referee: Lourens van der Merwe (South Africa)

==== 5th place game ====
22 June 2012
14:15

France	7–18	Ireland
	Report

Newlands Stadium, Newlands
Referee: Francisco Pastrana (Argentina)

=== Finals ===
Semi-finals
17 June – Newlands
Wales	6
New Zealand	30
17 June – Newlands
Argentina	3
South Africa	35

Final
22 June – Newlands
New Zealand	16
South Africa	22
3rd place
22 June – Newlands
Wales	25
Argentina	17

==== Semi-finals ====
17 June 2012
17:00

Wales	6–30	New Zealand
Pen: T. Prydie (2/3) 4', 14'	Report	Try: J. Tupou 38' c J. Emery 42' c J. Taufua 51' m O. Tu'ungafasi 63' m Con: I. West (2/4) 38', 43'; Pen: I. West (2/3) 26', 29'

Newlands Stadium, Newlands
Referee: Lourens van der Merwe (South Africa)

17 June 2012
19:15

Argentina	3–35	South Africa
Pen: S. Poet (1/3) 45'	Report	Try: J. Serfontein 21' c M. Pretorius 36' m R. Rhule (2) 40' c, 52' c Con: H. Pollard (3/4) 22', 40', 53'; Pen: H. Pollard (2/3) 7', 62'; T. Jantjies (1/3) 66'

Newlands Stadium, Newlands
Referee: Glen Jackson (New Zealand)

==== Third place game ====
22 June 2012
16:30

Wales	25–17	Argentina

Newlands Stadium, Newlands
Referee: Mathieu Raynal (France)

==== Final ====
22 June 2012
18:45

New Zealand	16–22	South Africa
Try: M. Keresoma 34' c Con: I. West (1/1) 35'; Pen: I. West (2/3) 13', 56'	Report	Try: V. van der Watt 47' m J. Serfontein 61' m Pen: H. Pollard (4/5) 10', 19', 39', 75'; Drop: H. Pollard (1/1) 60'

Newlands Stadium, Newlands
Attendance: 33,210
Referee: Greg Garner (England)
