= Fraser McReight =

Australian rugby union player

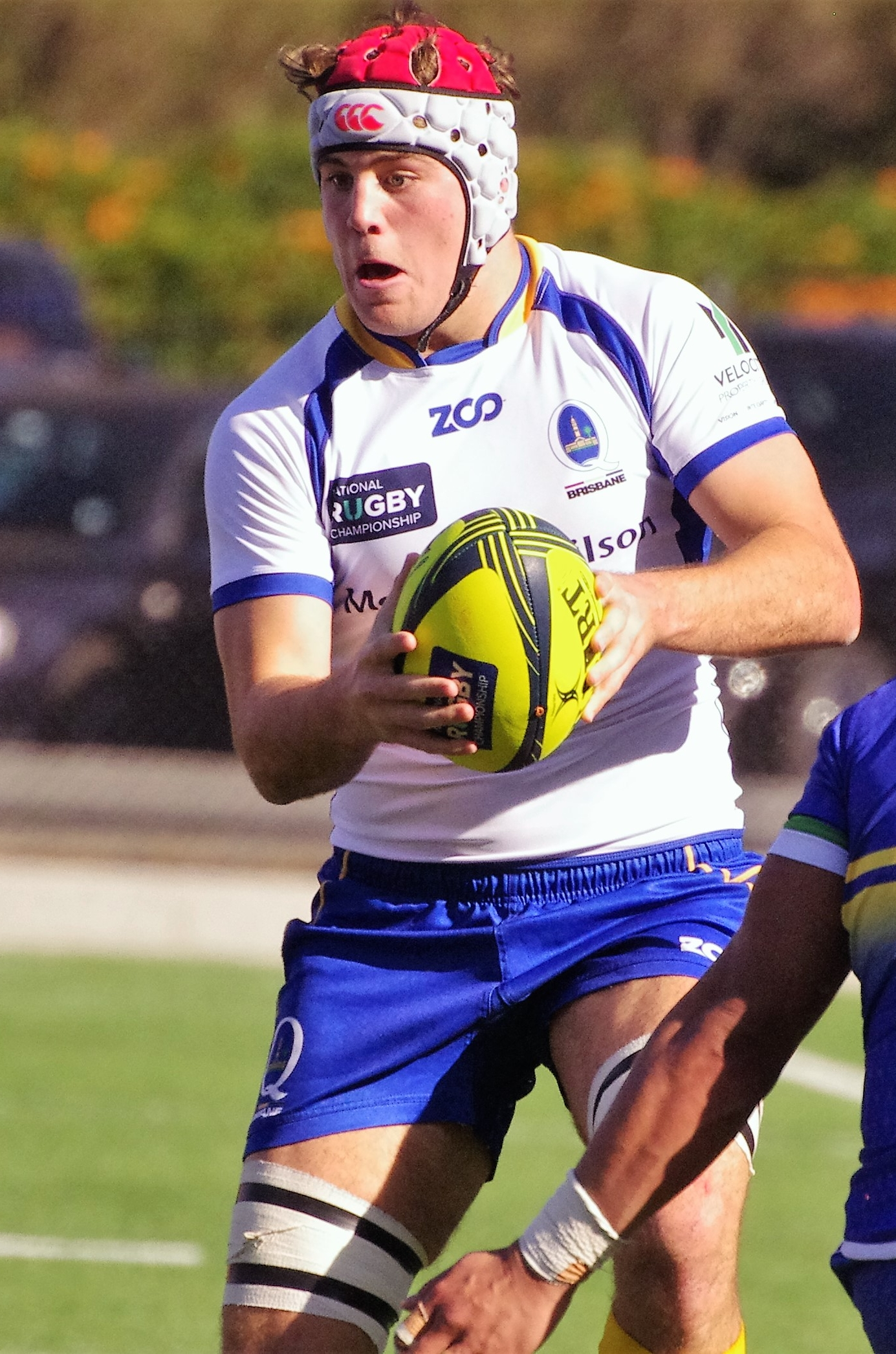
- McReight representing Brisbane City in 2018
- Born: 19 February 1999 (age 27) Buderim, Queensland, Australia
- Height: 1.86 m (6 ft 1 in)
- Weight: 108 kg (238 lb; 17 st 0 lb)
- School: Brisbane Grammar School

Rugby union career
- Position: Flanker
- Current team: Queensland Reds
Senior career
Years	Team	Apps	(Points)
2018–2019	Brisbane City	12	(10)
2019–	Queensland Reds	100	(125)
- Correct as of 6 June 2026
International career
Years	Team	Apps	(Points)
2018–2019	Australia U20	10	(20)
2020–	Australia	49	(85)
2022	Australia A	3	(10)
- Correct as of 17 October 2026
Medal record
Men's rugby union
Representing Australia
Oceania U20 Championship
Winner	2019 Gold Coast
Junior World Cup
Runner-up	2019 Argentina

Fraser McReight (born 19 February 1999) is an Australian professional rugby union player who plays as a flanker for Super Rugby club Queensland Reds and the Australia national team.

== Early life ==
McReight began his junior rugby with the Albany Creek Brumbies, in Brisbane's north. He then attended Brisbane Grammar School in Queensland GPS competition, where he played in the 1st XV for three seasons (2014–16), playing openside flanker, number 8 and inside centre. During his tenure at the school, he quickly developed a reputation for his work rate and versatility in the forward pack, highlighting both his physicality and football intelligence, marking him as one of the top schoolboy prospects in the state. This led to him representing Australian Schools in 2016.

He represented the junior Wallabies twice, in 2018 and 2019. In 2018, McReight led the Junior Wallabies to their first Oceania U20s title, including a 24-0 victory over New Zealand. He then captained the side in 2019 at the U20 Rugby World Cup, losing to France in the final. Across these campaigns, McReight’s leadership and consistency were widely recognised, as he was awarded the Junior Wallabies Player of the Year in consecutive seasons. His emergence as one of Australia’s premier young forwards led to him signing his first professional contract with the Queensland Reds in 2018, marking the transition from a highly decorated junior career into the professional ranks.

== Club career ==
After signing his first professional contract with the Queensland Reds in 2018, McReight made his Super Rugby debut in 2019 against the ACT Brumbies. In his debut season, he was primarily used as a developing squad member, gaining experience off the bench while adapting to the physical demands of professional rugby.

McReight’s breakthrough came during the 2020 Super Rugby season, where he began to establish himself as a regular member of the Reds’ back row. His performances at the breakdown, particularly his ability to win turnovers and slow opposition ball, quickly became a defining feature of his game.

In 2021, McReight played an important role in the Reds’ successful Super Rugby AU campaign, contributing to the team’s first title since 2011. Although often competing for the openside flanker position, he demonstrated versatility by covering multiple back-row roles, including number eight.

From 2022 onwards, McReight cemented his position as a starting openside flanker for the Reds. He became widely regarded as one of the premier breakdown specialists in Super Rugby, regularly ranking among the competition leaders for turnovers won. His high work rate in defence and increasing contribution in attack made him a central figure in the Reds’ forward pack.

By the mid-2020s, McReight had developed into one of the team’s senior leaders. In 2026, he was appointed captain of the Queensland Reds, reflecting his standing within the squad and his progression from a promising junior to a key figure at the club.

== International career ==
McReight made his international debut for the Wallabies during the second round of the 2020 Tri Nations Series—a rebranded edition of The Rugby Championship due to the COVID-19 pandemic—against the New Zealand in Sydney. He entered the match as a replacement for Harry Wilson in the 67th minute, with Australia going on to lose 43–5.

McReight’s opportunities at Test level were initially limited, and he made just one further appearance in 2021, again as a replacement, against New Zealand at Eden Park—a venue where Australia has historically struggled. Despite limited game time, he continued to develop his game at Super Rugby level, pushing for greater involvement in the national setup.

He enjoyed a breakthrough at international level in 2022, featuring in eight Tests, including six starts at openside flanker. He made his first starting appearance in a 41–26 victory over the Argentina in Mendoza, where his performance at the breakdown and defensive work rate drew widespread praise. During this period, he began to establish himself as a genuine contender for Australia’s long-term No.7 jersey.

McReight scored his first Test try against Argentina in the opening round of the 2022 Rugby Championship, further highlighting his growing impact in international rugby.

In 2023, he featured in three Test matches leading into the 2023 Rugby World Cup, starting each at openside flanker. He was subsequently selected in Australia’s World Cup squad, appearing in all four of the team’s matches—three as a starter and one from the bench—during a difficult campaign for the Wallabies. Despite the team’s early exit, McReight’s individual performances were considered among the positives for Australia.

Following the World Cup, McReight re-established himself as a key member of the Wallabies forward pack. In August 2025, during the 2025 Rugby Championship, he delivered one of the standout performances of his international career, earning “Man of the Match” honours in Australia’s 38–22 victory over the South Africa at Ellis Park Stadium. The win was particularly significant, marking Australia’s first victory at the venue since 1963, achieved after overturning a 22-point deficit.

By the mid-2020s, McReight had cemented his reputation as one of Australia’s leading openside flankers, known for his breakdown expertise, defensive intensity and consistency at Test level.

In 2026, McReight was awarded the annual John Eales Medal, the Wallabies' Player of the Year award, becoming the first Queensland Reds player to receive the honour since Chris Latham in 2006.
