= Oceania Rugby Under 20 Championship =

International rugby union competition

Oceania Rugby Under 20
- Most recent tournament 2022 Oceania Rugby Under 20 Championship
- Sport: Rugby union
- Instituted: 2015
- Number of teams: 4 (2018)

The Oceania Rugby Under 20 Championship is an international rugby union competition organised by Oceania Rugby, which is the regional governing body for rugby in Oceania. It is contested by men's junior national teams with an under-20 age requirement, and played as two tournaments: the Oceania Championship for teams that qualify for the World Championship; and the Oceania Trophy for teams aiming to compete in the World Rugby U20 Trophy.

== History ==
This event replaced Oceania's former age-grade competition, the Oceania Under 19 Rugby Championship. The inaugural first division tournament, played at Bond University, Gold Coast on Australia's Gold Coast in May 2015, featured four national under 20 teams and was won by New Zealand.

A planned tournament for a further six national under 20 sides was postponed, until December 2015. However, Fiji and Tonga participated in the Australian Under 20 Rugby Championship to prepare for the 2015 World Rugby Under 20 Trophy. The inaugural Oceania Rugby U20 Trophy, featuring four national under 20 teams, was played in Suva in December 2015 and won by Fiji.

== Teams ==
The teams for the Oceania Rugby Under 20 tournaments, as of 2022, were:

=== Championship ===
- Argentina
- Australia
- Fiji
- New Zealand

=== Trophy ===
- Samoa
- Tonga

== Tournament winners ==
=== Championship ===
Year	Host city	Teams	Winner	Ref
2015	Gold Coast, Australia	4	New Zealand	
2016	Gold Coast, Australia	2	New Zealand	
2017	Gold Coast, Australia	4	New Zealand	
2018	Gold Coast, Australia	4	New Zealand	
2019	Gold Coast, Australia	4	Australia	
2020	Cancelled due to the COVID-19 pandemic			
2021	Cancelled due to the COVID-19 pandemic			
2022	Sunshine Coast, Australia	4	New Zealand	

=== Trophy ===
Year	Host city	Teams	Winner	Ref
2015	Suva, Fiji	4	Fiji	
2016	Suva, Fiji	3	Fiji	
2017	Lautoka, Fiji	2	Fiji	
2018	Apia, Samoa	2	Tonga	
2019	Not contested ^{a}			
2020	Apia, Samoa	2	Samoa	
2021	Cancelled due to the COVID-19 pandemic			
2022	Nuku'alofa, Tonga	2	Samoa	

Notes

^^{a} The Oceania U20 Trophy is traditionally held in November or December. There was no tournament in 2019 due to the event being pushed back by several months into 2020 to be closer to the World U20 Trophy.

== See also ==
- World Rugby Under 20 Championship
- World Rugby U20 Trophy
- Pacific Rugby Challenge
- Oceania Rugby Cup
- U20 Rugby Championship
