= 2022 Oceania Rugby Under 20 Championship =

- Countries: Argentina; Australia; Fiji; New Zealand
- Date: 1–10 July 2022
- Champions: New Zealand
- Runners-up: Argentina
- Matches played: 6

The 2022 Oceania Rugby Under 20 Championship was the sixth edition of the Oceania Rugby Under 20 Championship. An invitation was extended to Argentina U20 to play in the Championship tournament for the first time, joining Fiji U20, New Zealand U20, and hosts Australia U20 for the three-round tournament at Sunshine Coast Stadium in Kawana Waters, Queensland, Australia. New Zealand won the tournament undefeated, with Argentina as runner-up.

== Teams ==
The teams for the 2022 Oceania Rugby Under 20 tournament were:

- Argentina
- Australia
- Fiji
- New Zealand

== Championship ==
=== Standings ===
Oceania Rugby Under 20 Championship
#	Team	P	W	D	L	PF	PA	PD	TF	TA	TB	LB	Pts
1	New Zealand	3	3	0	0	175	26	+149	24	2	3	0	15
2	Argentina	3	2	0	1	94	58	+36	13	7	1	0	9
3	Australia	3	1	0	2	91	98	−7	12	15	1	1	6
4	Fiji	3	0	0	3	15	193	−178	3	28	0	0	0

=== Round 1 ===
1 July 2022
17:00

New Zealand	74–5	Fiji
Try: Bell (2), Springer, Vikena, Hotham, Lakai, Lennox, Sititi, Rova, Miller, Cashmore; Con: Miller (5), Cashmore (3); Pen: Miller	Report	Try: Naseara

Sunshine Coast Stadium, Kawana Waters

1 July 2022
19:00

Australia	21–24	Argentina
Try: M Grealy 18'; Penalty try 79'; Pen: M Gordon (3) 7', 20', 31'	Report	Try: Penalty try (2) 5', 27'; E Chiavassa 45'; Con: T Folch (1) 46'; Pen: A Sascaro 79'

Sunshine Coast Stadium, Kawana Waters

=== Round 2 ===
5 July 2022
14:00

New Zealand	32–9	Argentina
Try: Te Hiwi, Haig, Lam, Springer; Con: Miller (3); Pen: Cashmore (2)	Report	Pen: Folch (3)

Sunshine Coast Stadium, Kawana Waters

5 July 2022
16:00

Australia	58–5	Fiji
Try: B Dowling (2), D Vaihu (2), J Blake (2), M Grealy, J Bowen, T Wilson; Con: J Bowen (5); Pen: J Bowen	Report	Try: P Mailulu

Sunshine Coast Stadium, Kawana Waters

=== Round 3 ===
10 July 2022
14:00

Argentina	61–5	Fiji
Try: T Elizalde 15'; Cabral (2) 22', 59'c Wagner (2) 31'c, 34'c Soler 49', Albanese 54'; Con: Folch (2) 31', 34'; Sascaro 59'; Pen: Folch 6'	Report	Try: Baselala 12'

Sunshine Coast Stadium, Kawana Waters

10 July 2022
16:00

Australia	12–69	New Zealand
Try: Lancaster, Brown; Con: Gordon (1)	Report	Try: Bell (3), Sititi, Higgins, Hotham, Cashmore, Te Hiwi, Springer, Beehre, Penalty try Con: Cashmore (6)

Sunshine Coast Stadium, Kawana Waters

== Trophy ==
The Oceania Trophy was played at Teufaiva Stadium on Nukuʻalofa, Tonga as a two-match series between Tonga and Samoa.

=== Standings ===
Final competition table:

#	Team	Pld	W	D	L	PF	PA	PD	Pts
1	Samoa	2	1	0	1	27	25	+2	5
2	Tonga	2	1	0	1	25	27	−2	5

=== Results ===
29 November 2022

Tonga	20–19	Samoa

Teufaiva Stadium, Nukuʻalofa

7 December 2022

Tonga	5–8	Samoa

Teufaiva Stadium, Nukuʻalofa
