= 2017 Oceania Rugby Under 20 Championship =

Sporting event

- Countries: Australia; Fiji; New Zealand; Samoa
- Date: 28 April – 6 May 2017
- Champions: New Zealand (3rd title)
- Runners-up: Australia
- Matches played: 6

The 2017 Oceania Rugby Under 20s, was the third edition of the Oceania Rugby Junior Championship. The competition was expanded from the previous season with Fiji and Samoa joining New Zealand and hosts Australia at Bond University on the Gold Coast.

The Oceania Championship was played over three rounds in nine days, with New Zealand defeating Australia by 43–6 in the last match of the round-robin tournament on 6 May 2017, to take the title.

The Oceania Trophy was played as a two-match series between Fiji and Tonga, held in Lautoka, Fiji. Both matches finished as draws but Fiji, after securing a four-try bonus point in the second match, won the event.

== Teams ==
The teams for the 2017 Oceania Rugby Under 20 tournaments were:

Championship

- Australia
- Fiji
- New Zealand
- Samoa

Trophy

- Fiji
- Tonga

== Championship ==
=== Standings ===
Final competition table:

Team	Pld	W	D	L	PF	PA	PD	Pts
New Zealand	3	3	0	0	186	32	+154	15
Australia	3	2	0	1	81	87	−6	9
Samoa	3	1	0	2	82	152	−70	5
Fiji	3	0	0	3	56	134	−78	1
Updated: 6 May 2017 Source: Oceania Rugby

Competition rules
Points breakdown:
4 points for a win
2 points for a draw
1 bonus point for a loss by seven points or less
1 bonus point for scoring four or more tries in a match
Classification:
Teams standings are calculated as follows:
Most log points accumulated from all matches
Most log points accumulated in matches between tied teams
Highest difference between points scored for and against accumulated from all matches
Most points scored accumulated from all matches

=== Round 1 ===
28 April 2017	New Zealand	63–3	Fiji	Bond University, Gold Coast
17:00	Try: Jordan (3), Christie (2), Papali'i, Leger, Sauni; Con: Falcon (6), Matoe; Pen: Falcon (3)	Summary	Pen: Botitu	Referee: Ed Martin

28 April 2017	Australia	43–20	Samoa	Bond University, Gold Coast
19:00	Try: Ma'afu, Hewat, Johnson-Holmes, Scott-Young, Lonergan, Ikitau, Ramm; Con: Lonergan (4)	Summary	Try: Telea, Filipo; Con: Lolesio, Ene; Pen: Ene (2)	Referee: Damon Murphy

=== Round 2 ===
2 May 2017	New Zealand	80–23	Samoa	Bond University, Gold Coast
17:00	Try: Ennor (2), Aumua, Coxon, Slade, Jacobson, Price, Clarke, Umaga-Jensen, Nareki, Lindenmuth, Papali'i; Con: Matoe (6), Falcon (4), Coxon	Summary	Try: Filipo, Ah See; Con: Ene (2); Pen: Ene (3)

2 May 2017	Australia	32–24	Fiji	Bond University, Gold Coast
19:00	Try: Ma'afu (2), Hewat, Strang; Con: Nucifora (3); Pen: Nucifora (2)	Summary	Try: Tagi, Bogidrau, Tukania; Con: Botitu (2), Vukatavo; Pen: Vukatavo

=== Round 3 ===
6 May 2017	Samoa	39–29	Fiji	Bond University, Gold Coast
17:00	Try: Ah See (2), Fepuleai, Ene, Enoku, Paisami; Con: Ene (3); Pen: Ene	Summary	Try: Matawalu, Kotz, Turagavola, Batiniu; Con: Kotz (2), Bolatolu; Pen: Kotz

6 May 2017	Australia	6–43	New Zealand	Bond University, Gold Coast
19:00	Pen: Nucifora (2)	Summary	Try: Jacobson (2), Jordan (2), Christie, Tua; Con: Falcon (5); Pen: Falcon

New Zealand
Oceania Champion
Third title

== Trophy ==
The Oceania Trophy was played in Lautoka, Fiji as a two-match series between Fiji and Tonga.

=== Standings ===
Final competition table:

#	Team	Pld	W	D	L	PF	PA	PD	Pts
1	Fiji	2	0	2	0	41	41	0	5
2	Tonga	2	0	2	0	41	41	0	4
Updated: 2 December 2017 Source: Oceania Rugby

Competition rules
Points breakdown:
4 points for a win
2 points for a draw
Classification:
Teams standings are calculated as follows:
Most log points accumulated from all matches
Most log points accumulated in matches between tied teams
Highest difference between points scored for and against accumulated from all matches
Most points scored accumulated from all matches

=== Results ===
28 November	Fiji	15–15	Tonga	Churchill Park, Lautoka
		Summary

2 December	Fiji	26–26	Tonga	Churchill Park, Lautoka
		Summary

Fiji
Oceania Trophy Winner
Third title

== See also ==
- 2017 World Rugby Under 20 Championship
- 2017 World Rugby Under 20 Trophy
