= 2016 Oceania Rugby Under 20 Championship =

- Countries: Australia; New Zealand
- Date: 3–7 May 2016
- Champions: New Zealand (2nd title)
- Runners-up: Australia

The 2016 Oceania Rugby Under 20 Championship, was the second edition of the Oceania Rugby Junior Championship. It was played as two tournaments; the Oceania Under 20 Championship hosted on the Gold Coast in Australia, and the Oceania Under 20 Trophy hosted in Suva.

The Championship was played in May, with New Zealand defeating Australia by 30–10 in the first match of the tournament. Australia won the second match by 25–24 to draw the series one-all, but New Zealand took the championship due to superior points difference. The Trophy competition was played in December and won by Fiji, who defeated Tonga by 18–13 in the last round to qualify for the World Rugby U20 Trophy in 2017.

== Teams ==
The teams for the 2016 Oceania Rugby Under 20 tournaments were:

Championship

- Australia
- New Zealand

Trophy

- Cook Islands
- Fiji
- Tonga

== Championship ==
=== Round 1 ===
3 May 2016	Australia	10–30	New Zealand	Bond University, Gold Coast
18:30	Try: Sorovi 49' c Con: Mason (1/1) 50'; Pen: Mason (1/1) 32'; Cards: Tyrel Lomax (yellow card) 62' to 72'	Report; Summary	Try: Emerson (2) 14' m, 66' c Strange 46' m Barrett 52' c Con: Barrett (2/4) 53', 77'; Pen: Barrett (2/2), 6', 65'	Referee: Nic Berry

Team details

Australia
FB	15	Jack Maddocks
RW	14	Ah-Mu Tuimalealiifano
OC	13	Liam Jurd
IC	12	Jordan Jackson-Hope
LW	11	Joey Fittock
FH	10	Mack Mason
SH	9	Moses Sorovi
N8	8	Harley Fox
OF	7	Maclean Jones (c)
BF	6	Angus Scott-Young
RL	5	Ryan McCauley
LL	4	Harry Hockings
TP	3	Tyrel Lomax
HK	2	Joshua Taylor
LP	1	Faalelie Sione
Replacements:
R	16	Jordan Uelese
R	17	Vunipola Fifita
R	18	Sham Vui
R	19	Rob Leota
R	20	Ikapote Tupai
R	21	Angus Fowler
R	22	Billy Gray
R	23	Sione Tuipolotu

New Zealand
FB	15	Peter Umaga-Jensen
RW	14	Jonah Lowe
OC	13	Patelesio Tomkinson
IC	12	Jordie Barrett
LW	11	Mason Emerson
FH	10	Stephen Perofeta
SH	9	Sam Nock
N8	8	Marino Mikaele-Tu’u
OF	7	Mitch Jacobson
BF	6	Luke Jacobson
RL	5	Sam Caird
LL	4	Quinten Strange
TP	3	Pouri Rakete-Stones
HK	2	Leni Apisai (c)
LP	1	Ayden Johnstone
Replacements:
R	16	Asafo Aumua
R	17	Shaun Stodart
R	18	Alex Fidow
R	19	Lui Luamanu
R	20	Dalton Papali’i
R	21	Ereatara Enari
R	22	Orbyn Leger
R	23	Josh McKay

=== Round 2 ===
7 May 2016	Australia	25–24	New Zealand	Bond University, Gold Coast
16:00	Try: Kennewell 4' c Rodda 26' c Fittock 51' m Con: Mason (2/3) 5', 27'; Pen: Mason (2) 10', 80'	Report; Summary	Try: Makene 50' c Nock 67' c Lowe 70' c Con: Barrett (3/3) 51', 68', 71'; Pen: Barrett (1) 21'	Referee: Graham Cooper

Team details

Australia
FB	15	Jack Maddocks
RW	14	Simon Kennewell
OC	13	Sione Tuipolotu
IC	12	Nicholas Jooste
LW	11	Joseph Fittock
FH	10	Mack Mason
SH	9	Angus Fowler
N8	8	Maclean Jones
OF	7	Liam Wright
BF	6	Angus Scott-Young
RL	5	Ryan McCauley
LL	4	Izack Rodda
TP	3	Tyrel Lomax
HK	2	Joshua Taylor
LP	1	Sione Faalelei
Replacements:
R	16	Richie Kelemete-Asiata
R	17	Vunipola Fifita
R	18	Shambeckler Vui
R	19	Robert Leota
R	20	Harley Fox
R	21	Moses Sorovi
R	22	Thomas Molloy
R	23	Ah-Mu Tuimalealiifano

New Zealand
FB	15	Caleb Makene
RW	14	Malo Tuitama
OC	13	Sio Tomkinson
IC	12	Jordie Barrett
LW	11	Jonah Lowe
FH	10	Orbyn Leger
SH	9	Jonathan Taumateine
N8	8	Marino Mikaele Tu'u
OF	7	Dalton Papali'i
BF	6	Luke Jacobson
RL	5	Sam Caird
LL	4	Quinten Strange
TP	3	Alex Fidow
HK	2	Leni (c) Apisai
LP	1	Shaun Stodart
Replacements:
R	16	Asafo Aumua
R	17	Ayden Johnstone
R	18	Sean Paranihi
R	19	Lui Luamanua
R	20	Caleb Aperahama
R	21	Sam Nock
R	22	Stephen Perofeta
R	23	Mason Emerson

New Zealand
Oceania Champion
Second title

== Trophy ==
=== Standings ===
Final competition table:

Team	Pld	W	D	L	PF	PA	PD	Pts
Fiji	2	2	0	0	68	16	+52	9
Tonga	2	1	0	1	63	30	+33	6
Cook Islands	2	0	0	2	15	100	−85	0
Updated: 10 December 2016; Source: worldrugby.org

Fiji
Oceania Trophy Winner
Second title
