= Vaafusuaga Telesia McDonald Alipia =

New Zealand academic

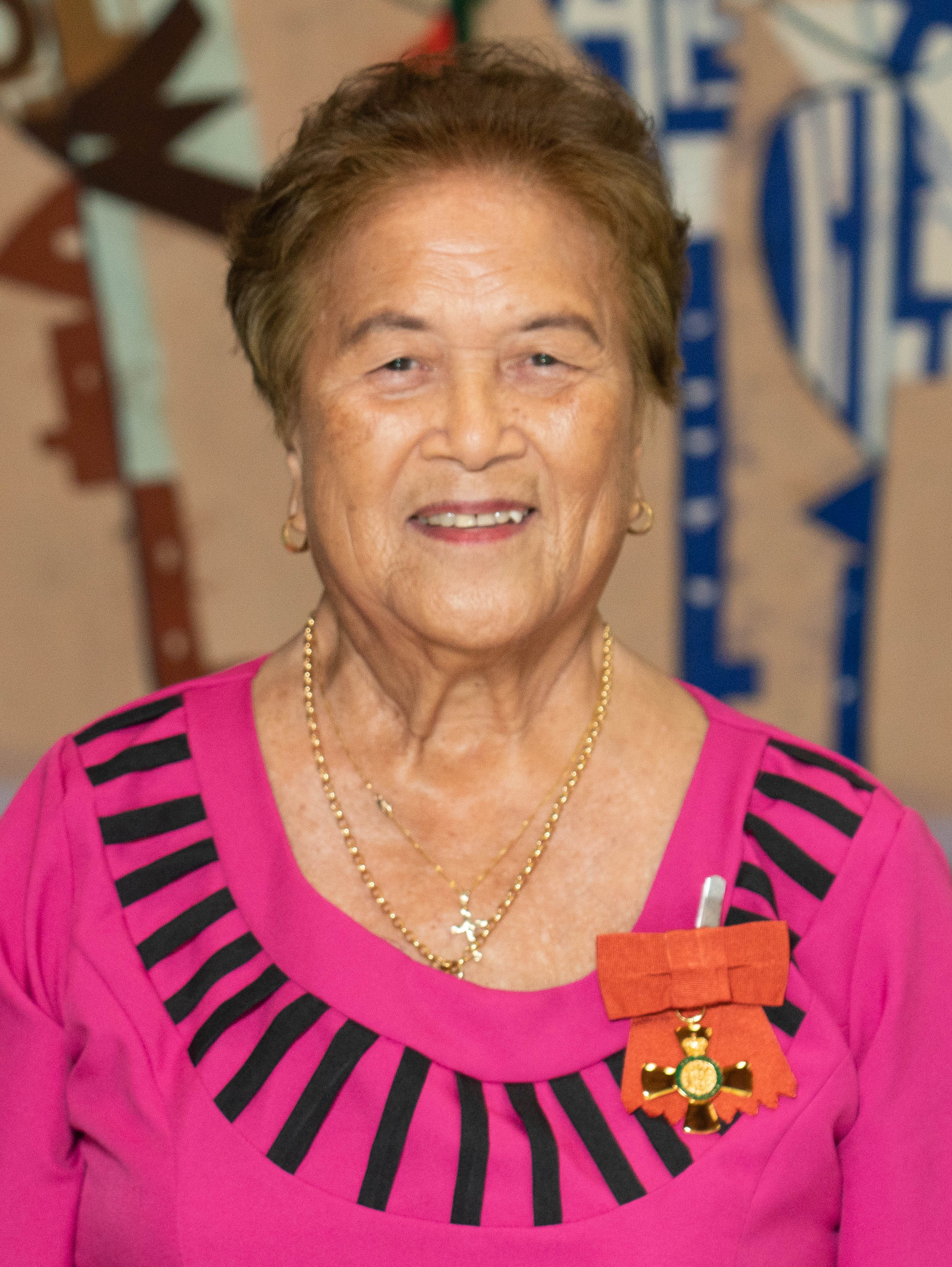
Alipia in 2021

Afamasaga Vaafusuaga Telesia McDonald Alipia ONZM (born c. 1941) is a Samoan-born New Zealand educator and academic.

== Early life and education ==
Alipia is from the villages of Falealupo, Palisi, Fasitoo Tai and Lotopa in Samoa. Beginning in 1970, she served as the Director of Early Childhood Education in Samoa, where she trained early childhood teachers. After studying at Hebrew University of Jerusalem she moved to New Zealand in 1991 at the request of the Pacific Island Early Childhood Council to help develop the curriculum for the first Pacific Islands Diploma of Early Childhood Education.

== Academic career ==
In 1994 she became head of centre at Auckland College of Education led the delivery of the diploma. She also worked on the development of the early childhood curriculum in Te Reo and the Samoan language, as well as advising the Ministry of Education about Pacific educational outcomes and serving as national coordinator for the Home Interaction Programme for Parents and Youngsters (HIPPY). In 2004, she became Director of the Pacific Centre at the University of Auckland's Faculty of Education.

In the 2021 New Year Honours, she was appointed an Officer of the New Zealand Order of Merit for services to Pacific early childhood education.
