= 2008 IRB Junior World Championship =

Tournament details
- Host: Wales
- Date: 6–22 June 2008
- Teams: 16

Final positions
- Champions: New Zealand
- Runner-up: England
- Third place: South Africa

Tournament statistics
- Matches played: 40

The 2008 IRB Junior World Championship was the first annual international rugby union competition for Under 20 national teams. All players who were twenty years of age or under on 1 January 2008 were eligible for selection.

This competition replaced the now defunct Under 19 Rugby World Championship and Under 21 Rugby World Championship. The event, organised by rugby's governing body, the International Rugby Board (IRB), was contested by sixteen men's under-20 national teams.

The tournament was held in June and hosted by Wales, at four separate venues, and won by New Zealand.

== Venues ==
City	Ground	Capacity
Cardiff	Arms Park	13,500
Newport	Rodney Parade	11,700
Swansea	Liberty Stadium	20,532
Wrexham	Racecourse Ground	15,500

== Calendar ==
Stage	First Match		Last Match
Matchday 1	17:00 2008-06-06	to	19:00 2008-06-06
Matchday 2	17:00 2008-06-10	to	19:00 2008-06-10
Matchday 3	15:00 2008-06-14	to	17:00 2008-06-14
Matchday 4	17:00 2008-06-18	to	19:00 2008-06-18
Final Day – North Wales	18:00 2008-06-21	to	20:00 2008-06-21
Final Day – South Wales	13:00 2008-06-22	to	19:00 2008-06-22

== Pools ==
Qualified for the Championship Semi-finals
Qualified for the 5th to 8th Placed Playoffs
Qualified for the 9th to 12th Placed Playoffs
Qualified for the 13th to 16th Placed Playoffs

=== Pool A ===
Team	Played	Won	Drawn	Lost	Tries	For	Against	Difference	BP	Points
New Zealand	3	3	0	0	25	173	19	+154	3	15
Argentina	3	2	0	1	6	47	69	–32	1	9
Ireland	3	1	0	2	6	64	109	–45	1	5
Tonga	3	0	0	3	3	46	123	–77	0	0

Match Results
Date	Home	Score	Away	Venue
6 June 2008	New Zealand	48–9	Tonga	Arms Park, Cardiff
6 June 2008	Argentina	17–9	Ireland	Arms Park, Cardiff
10 June 2008	Argentina	30–10	Tonga	Arms Park, Cardiff
10 June 2008	New Zealand	65–10	Ireland	Arms Park, Cardiff
14 June 2008	Ireland	45–27	Tonga	Arms Park, Cardiff
14 June 2008	New Zealand	60–0	Argentina	Arms Park, Cardiff

=== Pool B ===
Team	Played	Won	Drawn	Lost	Tries	For	Against	Difference	BP	Points
South Africa	3	3	0	0	27	196	32	+164	2	14
Samoa	3	2	0	1	7	60	39	+21	1	9
Scotland	3	1	0	2	8	61	115	–54	1	5
United States	3	0	0	3	3	38	169	–131	0	0

Match Results
Date	Home	Score	Away	Venue
6 June 2008	South Africa	108–18	United States	Racecourse Ground, Wrexham
6 June 2008	Samoa	29–17	Scotland	Racecourse Ground, Wrexham
10 June 2008	Samoa	20–6	United States	Racecourse Ground, Wrexham
10 June 2008	South Africa	72–3	Scotland	Racecourse Ground, Wrexham
14 June 2008	Scotland	41–14	United States	Racecourse Ground, Wrexham
14 June 2008	South Africa	16–11	Samoa	Racecourse Ground, Wrexham

=== Pool C ===
Team	Played	Won	Drawn	Lost	Tries	For	Against	Difference	BP	Points
England	3	3	0	0	17	119	48	+71	2	14
Australia	3	2	0	1	27	147	47	+100	3	11
Canada	3	1	0	2	5	47	151	–104	0	4
Fiji	3	0	0	3	4	44	111	–67	1	1

Match Results
Date	Home	Score	Away	Venue
6 June 2008	Australia	81–12	Canada	Rodney Parade, Newport
6 June 2008	England	41–17	Fiji	Rodney Parade, Newport
10 June 2008	England	60–18	Canada	Rodney Parade, Newport
10 June 2008	Australia	53–17	Fiji	Rodney Parade, Newport
14 June 2008	Australia	13–18	England	Rodney Parade, Newport
14 June 2008	Fiji	10–17	Canada	Rodney Parade, Newport

=== Pool D ===
Team	Played	Won	Drawn	Lost	Tries	For	Against	Difference	BP	Points
Wales	3	3	0	0	11	85	39	+46	2	14
France	3	2	0	1	13	104	54	+50	3	11
Italy	3	1	0	2	4	48	81	–33	0	4
Japan	3	0	0	3	7	47	110	–63	1	1

Match Results
Date	Home	Score	Away	Venue
6 June 2008	France	53–17	Japan	Liberty Stadium, Swansea
6 June 2008	Wales	29–10	Italy	Liberty Stadium, Swansea
10 June 2008	France	32–14	Italy	Liberty Stadium, Swansea
10 June 2008	Wales	33–10	Japan	Liberty Stadium, Swansea
14 June 2008	Japan	20–24	Italy	Liberty Stadium, Swansea
14 June 2008	Wales	23–19	France	Liberty Stadium, Swansea

== Knockout stage ==
13th-16th Places Playoffs

Semi-finals
1	Tonga	17
4	Japan	5
3	United States	22
2	Fiji	27

Final
Tonga	28
Fiji	20

13th-16th Places Playoffs
Date	Home	Score	Away	Venue
18 June 2008	Tonga	17–5	Japan	Racecourse Ground, Wrexham
18 June 2008	United States	22–27	Fiji	Racecourse Ground, Wrexham

15th Place Play-Off
Date	Home	Score	Away	Venue
21 June 2008	Japan	44–8	United States	Racecourse Ground, Wrexham

13th Place Play-Off
Date	Home	Score	Away	Venue
21 June 2008	Tonga	28–20	Fiji	Racecourse Ground, Wrexham

9th-12th Place Playoffs

Semi-finals
1	Ireland	9
4	Italy	6
3	Scotland	15
2	Canada	10

Final
Ireland	39
Scotland	12

9th-12th Places Playoffs
Date	Home	Score	Away	Venue
18 June 2008	Scotland	15–10	Canada	Rodney Parade, Newport
18 June 2008	Ireland	9–6	Italy	Arms Park, Cardiff

11th Place Play-Off
Date	Home	Score	Away	Venue
21 June 2008	Italy	33–10	Canada	Arms Park, Cardiff

9th Place Play-Off
Date	Home	Score	Away	Venue
21 June 2008	Ireland	39–12	Scotland	Rodney Parade, Newport

5th-8th Places Playoffs

Semi-finals
1	Argentina	6
4	France	30
3	Samoa	0
2	Australia	32

Final
France	21
Australia	42

5th-8th Places Playoffs
Date	Home	Score	Away	Venue
18 June 2008	Argentina	6–30	France	Liberty Stadium, Swansea
18 June 2008	Samoa	0–32	Australia	Liberty Stadium, Swansea

7th Place Play-Off
Date	Home	Score	Away	Venue
21 June 2008	Argentina	10–30	Samoa	Rodney Parade, Newport

5th Place Play-Off
Date	Home	Score	Away	Venue
21 June 2008	France	21–42	Australia	Arms Park, Cardiff

1st place playoffs

Semi-finals
1	New Zealand	31
4	Wales	6
3	South Africa	18
2	England	26

Final
New Zealand	38
England	3

=== Semi-finals ===
18 June 2008
19:15

New Zealand	31–6	Wales
	(Report)

Rodney Parade, Newport

18 June 2008
19:15

South Africa	18–26	England
	(Report)

Arms Park, Cardiff

=== 3rd place playoffs ===
22 June 2008
17:00

Wales	18–43	South Africa
	(Report)

Liberty Stadium, Swansea

=== Final ===
22 June 2008
19:00

New Zealand	38–3	England
	(Report)

Liberty Stadium, Swansea
Attendance: 8537
Referee: Peter Fitzgibbon

== See also ==
- 2008 IRB Junior World Rugby Trophy
