= Australia national under-20 rugby union team =

Australia
- Union: Rugby Australia
- Nickname: Junior Wallabies
- Coach: Chris Whitaker
Team kit

First international
- Australia 81–12 Canada (6 June 2008; Rodney Parade, Newport)

Largest win
- Australia 91–7 Tonga (1 May 2018; Bond Sports Park, Gold Coast)

Largest defeat
- Australia 12–69 New Zealand (10 July 2022; SC Stadium, Bokarina)

World Cup
- Appearances: 14 (First in 2008)
- Best result: Runners-up (2010, 2019)

The Australia national under-20 rugby union team, nicknamed the Junior Wallabies, is the national under-20 rugby union team that represents Australia. The team has been competing at the annual World Rugby U20 Championship since it began in 2008, replacing the previously held under-19 and under-21 championships. The team also competes at the Oceania U20 Championship as of 2015 and the U20 Rugby Championship since 2024.

== History ==
The Junior Wallabies name was incorporated into the Australian under-20 crest prior to the 2018 season, but the name was also previously applied to several other teams in the history of Australian rugby. In the era of amateur rugby from the 1950s onwards, the Junior Wallabies team was selected from uncapped players (with no age restriction) to play against touring Test sides or to represent Australia on goodwill tours to Asia and the Pacific. Media publications sometimes also used the name Junior Wallabies to refer to age-graded national teams such as the Australian under-19 side, Australian Schoolboys, and later the Australian under-20 team.

Australia's highest finish at the World Rugby U20 Championship was second-place in 2010 and 2019. The team finished third in 2011 by beating France in the third place playoff, and fourth in 2009 after losing to South Africa 32–5 in the third place playoff.The Junior Wallabies also finished second in the first four editions of the Oceania U20 Championship before being crowned champions in 2019 after defeating New Zealand 24–0.

=== Selection policy ===
In June 2026, ahead of the team announcement for the 2026 World Rugby Junior World Championship in Georgia, Rugby Australia (RA) made a major change to its selection policy by including overseas-based players in the Junior Wallabies squad for the first time. As had been standard practice, all players were selected locally. The policy's aim was to maintain connections with talented Australians playing abroad and reduce the risk of losing them to other nations, similar to Emmanuel Meafou, who later chose to represent France. While the decision was seen as potentially controversial because it reduces opportunities for locally based players, RA said it is necessary to strengthen the talent pool and adapt to the increasing number of Australians pursuing professional pathways in France.

The Sydney Morning Herald stated that the move reflected the growing number of young Australian rugby players developing in French club academies. Two France-based props, Lehopa Leota of Racing 92 and Hayden Lavercombe of Vannes, were expected to be selected for the Junior World Championship squad. RA said overseas selections would remain limited and will only apply to standout performers. The former was later selected in the squad.

== Competitive record ==
=== Junior World Championship ===
Junior World Championship record
Year	Round	Pld	W	D	L	PF	PA
2008	Fifth place	5	4	0	1	221	68
2009	Fourth place	5	3	0	2	186	74
2010	Runners-up	5	4	0	1	239	131
2011	Third place	5	3	0	2	166	117
2012	Eighth place	5	1	0	4	107	94
2013	Seventh place	5	2	0	3	114	84
2014	Fifth place	5	4	0	1	176	101
2015	Fifth place	5	4	0	1	136	110
2016	Sixth place	5	2	0	3	120	116
2017	Sixth place	5	3	0	2	135	106
2018	Fifth place	5	3	0	2	178	103
2019	Runners-up	5	3	0	2	171	122
2023	Fifth place	5	3	1	1	179	157
2024 (Note: In the pool stage of the 2024 World Rugby U20 Championship, Australia's scheduled fixture against Ireland was cancelled due to weather conditions, rendering the pitch unplayable and unsafe. Each team was awarded two points. Thus Australia did not play the expected three pool stage matches followed-up by two knockout stage matches. Rather, Australia played two pool stage matches and two knockout stage matches, or four in total.)	Sixth place	4	2	0	2	89	71
2025	Fifth place	5	3	0	2	196	194
2026	To be determined.						
Total	Runners-up (2)	69	41	1	27	2,217	1,454

=== U20 Rugby Championship ===
U20 Rugby Championship record
Year	Round	Pld	W	D	L	PF	PA
2024	Fourth place	3	1	0	2	55	80
2025	Runners-up	3	2	1	0	98	89
2026	Fourth Place	3	1	0	2	78	120
Total	Runners-up (1)	6	3	1	2	153	169

=== Oceania Rugby U20 Championship ===
Oceania Rugby U20 Championship record
Year	Round	Pld	W	D	L	PF	PA
2015	Runners-up	3	2	0	1	109	87
2016	Runners-up	2	1	0	1	35	54
2017	Runners-up	3	2	0	1	81	87
2018	Runners-up	3	2	0	1	170	55
2019	Champions	3	3	0	0	104	14
2022	Third place	3	1	0	2	91	98
Total	Champions (1)	17	11	0	6	590	395

== Head coaches ==
Coach	Tenure	P	W	D	L	W%
Brian Melrose	2008	5	4	0	1	80%
David Nucifora	2009–2012	20	11	0	9	55%
Adrian Thompson	2013–2016	25	15	0	10	60%
Simon Cron	2017	8	5	0	3	62.5%
Jason Gilmore	2018–2019	16	11	0	5	68.75%
Nathan Grey	2020–2024	17	8	1	8	47.06%
Chris Whitaker	2025–present	To be determined				

== Players ==
=== Current squad ===
On 11 June 2026, a 30-man squad was announced for Australia's 2026 Junior World Championship. Included in the squad were two players in the Australia national sevens team, and two players based in France.

Head coach: Chris Whitaker

Player	Position	Date of birth (age)	Caps	Club/province
Charlie Hollyman	Hooker	20 July 2007 (age 19)	1	(Australia) Reds
Ewald Kruger	Hooker	16 January 2006 (age 20)	3	(Australia) Brumbies
John Grenfell	Hooker	5 July 2006 (age 20)	0	(Australia) Reds
Jacob Job	Prop	5 January 2006 (age 20)	3	(Australia) Reds
Edwin Langi	Prop	22 April 2006 (age 20)	10	(Australia) Waratahs
Lehopa Leota	Prop	6 May 2006 (age 20)	0	(France) Racing 92
Matthew Sauao	Prop	14 July 2007 (age 19)	0	(Australia) Waratahs
Kingbenjamin Swerling-Finaipepe	Prop	29 March 2007 (age 19)	0	(France) Castres
Toby Brial	Lock	23 May 2006 (age 20)	9	(Australia) Waratahs
Isaac Fonua	Lock	2 March 2007 (age 19)	3	(Australia) Waratahs
Kenny Harris	Lock	30 September 2006 (age 20)	3	(Australia) Reds
Will Ross	Lock	9 May 2007 (age 19)	3	(Australia) Reds
Luca Cleverley	Back row	17 November 2006 (age 20)	3	(Australia) Waratahs
Eli Langi	Back row	25 September 2006 (age 20)	10	(Australia) Brumbies
Marshall Le Maitre	Back row	30 July 2006 (age 20)	2	(Australia) Waratahs
Tom Robinson (c)	Back row	17 March 2006 (age 20)	7	(Australia) Reds
TJ Talaileva	Back row	25 May 2007 (age 19)	0	(Australia) Waratahs
Sam Blank	Scrum-half	28 July 2006 (age 20)	2	(Australia) Waratahs
Angus Grover	Scrum-half	24 September 2007 (age 19)	3	(Australia) Waratahs
Jonty Fowler	Fly-half	25 February 2007 (age 19)	3	(Australia) Waratahs
Finn Mackay	Fly-half	4 June 2007 (age 19)	2	(Australia) Reds
Zach Fittler	Centre		1	(Australia) Waratahs
Leo Jaques	Centre	5 May 2006 (age 20)	3	(Australia) Waratahs
Treyvon Pritchard	Centre	4 April 2007 (age 19)	0	(Australia) Reds
Tom Farr-Jones	Wing	26 January 2006 (age 20)	0	(Australia) Waratahs
Tai Taka	Wing	6 January 2008 (age 18)	3	(Australia) Reds
Cooper Watters	Wing	21 August 2006 (age 20)	10	Australia sevens
Charlie Bird	Fullback	20 November 2006 (age 20)	0	(Australia) Waratahs
Wallace Charlie	Fullback	6 August 2006 (age 20)	0	Australia sevens
Chayse Geros	Fullback	19 August 2007 (age 19)	2	(Australia) Brumbies

== Results ==
The following is a list of Australia's recent match results, as well as upcoming scheduled fixtures, during the 12 months up to the end of 2026:

Win Draw Loss Upcoming

27 April 2026	New Zealand	34–29	Australia	Nelson Mandela Bay Stadium, Gqeberha
14:00 SAST (UTC+02)		Report		Referee: Hanru van Rooyen (South Africa)

3 May 2026	South Africa	56–17	Australia	Nelson Mandela Bay Stadium, Gqeberha
16:10 SAST (UTC+02)		Report		Referee: Gonzalo de Achaval (Argentina)

9 May 2026	Argentina	30–32	Australia	Nelson Mandela Bay Stadium, Gqeberha
14:00 SAST (UTC+02)		Report		Referee: Christopher Allison (South Africa)

27 June 2026	Australia	90–22	Spain	Aia Arena, Kutaisi
20:30 GET (UTC+04)		Report		Referee: Kevin Bralley (France)

2 July 2026	Australia	53–17	Fiji	Aia Arena, Kutaisi
15:30 GET (UTC+04)		Report		Referee: Luke Rogan (United States)

7 July 2026	France	34–29	Australia	Aia Arena, Kutaisi
18:00 GET (UTC+04)		Report		Referee: Ben Connor (Wales)

12 July 2026	Australia	36–38	Wales	Avchala Stadium, Tbilisi
20:30 GET (UTC+04)		Report		Referee: Robbie Jenkinson (Ireland)

17 July 2026	Argentina	29–52	Australia	Avchala Stadium, Tbilisi
18:00 GET (UTC+04)				Referee: Kevin Bralley (France)

=== Head-to-head record ===
As of 17 July 2026. (Note: "rugbydatabase.co.nz" displays the Australia U20s record, however does not include a pre-2023 World Rugby U20 Championship two-test tour of New Zealand.)

Opponent	Pld	W	D	L	W%	PF	PA	Diff.
Argentina	11	6	0	5	54.55%	286	240	+46
Canada	2	2	0	0	100%	167	12	+155
England	10	2	1	7	20%	266	280	–14
Fiji	9	9	0	0	100%	405	142	+263
France	8	3	0	5	37.5%	207	204	+3
Georgia	1	1	0	0	100%	35	11	+24
Ireland	4	2	0	2	50%	98	84	+14
Italy	8	7	0	1	87.5%	276	112	+164
Japan	3	3	0	0	100%	165	64	+101
Japan U23	1	1	0	0	100%	54	26	+28
New Zealand	19	4	1	14	21.05%	406	660	–254
Samoa	6	6	0	0	100%	228	94	+134
Scotland	7	5	0	2	71.43%	252	128	+124
South Africa	7	3	0	4	42.86%	147	285	–138
Spain	1	1	0	0	100%	90	22	+68
Tonga	4	4	0	0	100%	252	25	+227
Wales	7	5	0	2	71.43%	240	171	+69
Total	108	64	2	42	59.26%	3,573	2,560	+1,013

== Awards and honours ==
=== Awards ===
The following Australia U20s players have been recognised at the World Rugby Awards since 2008:

World Rugby Junior Player of the Year
Year	Nominees	Winners
2009	Richard Kingi	—
2010	Robbie Coleman	—
2015	Jonah Placid	—
2019	Fraser McReight	—

=== Honours ===
- World Rugby U20 Championship
  - (silver) Runners-up (2): 2010, 2019
- U20 Rugby Championship
  - (silver) Runners-up (1): 2025
- Oceania Rugby U20 Championship
  - (gold) Champions (1): 2019
  - (silver) Runners-up (4): 2015, 2016, 2017, 2018
  - (bronze) Bronze medal (1): 2022

== See also ==
- Australian Under 20 Rugby Championship
- Australia national under-19 rugby union team
- Australia national under-21 rugby union team
