= Darran Harris =

Welsh rugby union footballer

- Born: Darran Harris; 11 November 1992 (age 34) Brecon, Wales
- Height: 180 cm (5 ft 11 in)
- Weight: 102 kg (225 lb)

Rugby union career
- Position(s): Hooker, prop
Youth career
- Brecon
- Merthyr
Senior career
Years	Team	Apps	(Points)
2010–2011	Merthyr		
2011–2013	Pontypridd	34	(?)
2013–2015	Scarlets	10	(5)
2013–2015	Llanelli	41	(20)
2014	Carmarthen Quins	2	(0)
2015–2016	Rotherham Titans	0	(0)
2016–2017	Newport Gwent Dragons	5	(0)
2016–2017	Bedwas	7	(0)
2016–2017	Ebbw Vale		
International career
Years	Team	Apps	(Points)
- Wales U16
- Wales U18
- Wales U20

Darran Harris (born 11 November 1992) is a Welsh rugby union player. He plays for RFU Championship side, Rotherham Titans as a hooker.

== Career ==
Born in Brecon, Harris started playing rugby at Brecon RFC as a prop before moving to the youth ranks of Merthyr RFC. During this time, he played for the youth team of the Welsh region of Cardiff Blues. While playing for the Blues, he was mentored by Dale McIntosh who convinced him to move to Pontypridd RFC in 2011 and changed him from a prop to a hooker. In 2013, he was part of the Pontypridd Welsh Premier Division and WRU Challenge Cup double-winning team. The next season, he left the Cardiff Blues region to move to Llanelli RFC which allowed him to play for Scarlets. He made his Scarlets debut in the Anglo-Welsh Cup against Saracens. He also played for Scarlets in the Premiership Sevens tournament. In 2015, Harris left Scarlets and Wales to play in England for RFU Championship Rotherham Titans for development.

When he joined the club, he was tipped to be Rotherham's first-choice hooker. After suffering an ankle injury in Rotherham's pre-season, he made his debut for Rotherham in the RFU Championship against Cornish Pirates. After four games of the season, Harris later suffered a shoulder injury that ruled him out of contention for a large part of Rotherham's 2015–16 RFU Championship season. After a year in England, Harris returned to Wales with the Dragons, for whom he played five times (one start) before being released at the end of the 2016–17 season.

== International career ==
In 2012, Harris was called up to the Wales national under-20 rugby union team, where he also played for them in the IRB Junior World Championship in South Africa.
