= Conor Gilsenan =

Irish rugby union player (born 1992)

- Born: Conor Gilsenan; 10 September 1992 (age 34) Mullingar, Westmeath, Ireland
- Height: 1.90 m (6 ft 3 in)
- Weight: 104 kg (16 st 5 lb; 229 lb)

Rugby union career
- Position(s): Flanker, Back Row
Senior career
Years	Team	Apps	(Points)
?-2014	Leinster		
2013–2014	→Connacht (loan)	3	(5)
2014-2020	London Irish	70	(10)
- Correct as of 17 March 2018
International career
Years	Team	Apps	(Points)
?-2012	Ireland U18		
2012–2013	Ireland U20	7	(0)

Conor Gilsenan (born 10 September 1992) is an Irish former rugby union player. His preferred position was flanker.

== Background ==
Although he played Gaelic football as a youngster, Gilsenan ultimately chose rugby union when, as a teenager, either avenue was open to him. Gilsenan cited his biggest influence in his chosen profession as coming from his family and 'role-model', Irish rugby player; Brian O'Driscoll.

However, he was playing Gaelic football for Wandsorth Gaels of London in 2022.

== Rugby career ==
Three successful years in Leinster's academy meant many International caps for Ireland at various youth levels. After a short loan spell at Connacht, Gilsenan was signed by London Irish in 2014. At the time Irish were competing in the RFU Championship. Highlights in the years that followed included captaining the club in their run to the British & Irish Cup semi-final (2016-2017 season). He also made six starts for The Exiles in their successful promotion campaign (to the Aviva Premiership). A Regular London Irish player in 2017-18.

He was not named in London Irish's squad update in August 2020, it was later confirmed he had been forced to retire for medical reasons.

== International career ==
Gilsenan is a former Ireland U18, U19 and U20 flanker.

== The Apprentice ==
In 2022, Gilsenan appeared as one of the candidates in The Apprentice, and was fired in week two.
