= Simione Kuruvoli =

Simione Kuruvoli may refer to:

- Simione Kuruvoli (judoka)
- Simione Kuruvoli (rugby union)
