= Australian Youth Rugby Championships =

Super Rugby Next Gen
- Logo introduced in 2018
- Sport: Rugby union
- Inaugural season: 2014; 12 years ago (National U20s)
- Number of teams: 5
- Country: Australia
- Holders: New South Wales (2025)
- Most titles: New South Wales (4 titles)
- Broadcast partner: Stan Sport
- Related competition: Super Rugby

The Super Rugby Next Gen, formerly known as Super Rugby U19s, (Note: Between 2023 and 2025.) and sometimes referred to as the Australian Youth Rugby Championships, is an Australian rugby union competition for men's youth teams that forms part of the pathway for selection to the Australia under-20 team. The competition is organised by Rugby Australia (RA).

== History ==
=== National U20s ===
The first National U20 Rugby Championship was played in 2014, and was contested by teams from New South Wales, Queensland and an Australian Barbarians side (selected from the other states and territories). National under-20 teams from the Pacific islands were also invited to play matches.

The competition was played over two stages, with a Southern States U20 Championship held in March for teams from ACT, Victoria, Western Australia, South Australia, Tasmania, Northern Territory, as well as New South Wales Country and Queensland Country. A representative team from that tournament was selected to participate in the National U20 Championship's top division.

Logo for 2016–2017.

=== Super U20s ===
The Super Under 20s Championship was launched in 2016, with teams from Australia's five Super Rugby franchises competing. Matches were scheduled as curtain-raisers to home games hosted by the Super Rugby teams, with the tournament played as a single round-robin followed by a final between the top two sides to determine the champion team.

=== U19s Rugby Championship ===
In 2018 the competition was changed to an Under-19 championship played six months earlier in the lead in to the Junior Wallabies campaign for the Oceania and World Rugby tournaments.

== Teams ==
The teams playing in the Under-19s Rugby Championship are:

- Australian Barbarians U19
- Brisbane City U19
- Brumbies U19
- Melbourne Rebels U19
- NSW Country U19
- Queensland Country U19
- Sydney U19
- Western Australia U19

Following the tournament, an initial squad for the Junior Wallabies team is selected from the best players. The Australian team competes in the Oceania U20 and World Rugby U20 championships.

== Champions ==
Year	# of Teams	Final			Refs
Year	# of Teams	Winner	Score	Runner-up	Refs
National Under 20s Championship
2014	4	New South Wales	round robin	Queensland	
2015	5	New South Wales	round robin	Queensland	
Super Under 20s Championship
2016	5	Queensland	35–5	Melbourne Rebels	
2017	5	Queensland	49–19	New South Wales	
U19s Rugby Championship
2018	8	Brisbane City	41–7	Queensland Country	
2019	8	Brisbane City	43–19	Sydney	
Tournaments cancelled between 2020–2021 due to impacts of the COVID-19 pandemic.
2022	5	New South Wales	44–31	Queensland	
Super Rugby U19s
2023	5	Australian Capital Territory	20–12	New South Wales	
2024	6	Australian Capital Territory	40–31	Queensland	
2025	4	New South Wales	31–24	Australian Capital Territory	
Super Rugby Next Gen
2026	4	TBC	–	TBC	

== See also ==
- Australia national under-20 rugby union team
- Oceania Under 20 Rugby Championship
- World Rugby Under 20 Championship
