= Lotopa =

Coordinates: 13°51′S 171°47′W

Lotopa is a village on the island of Upolu in Samoa. It is situated on the north central side of the island near the country's capital Apia. The village is in the political district of Tuamasaga.

The population is 1573.
