= Fiji national under-20 rugby union team =

Fiji
- Union: Fiji Rugby Union
- Nickname: Baby Flying Fijians
- Emblem: Palm tree
- Coach: Andrew Osborne
Team kit	Change kit

First international
- England 41–17 Fiji (6 June 2008; Rodney Parade, Newport)

Largest win
- Fiji 109–6 Vanuatu (1 December 2015; Bidesi Grounds, Suva)

Largest defeat
- Fiji 17–104 South Africa (26 June 2011; Stadio Comunale di Monigo, Treviso)

World Cup
- Appearances: 11 (First in 2008)
- Best result: Sixth place (2011)

The Fiji national under-20 rugby team, nicknamed the Baby Flying Fijians, is the national under-20 representative rugby union team of Fiji.

== History ==
Under 20 age grade rugby came into existence, as a result of the IRB combining the Under 19 Rugby World Championship and Under 21 Rugby World Championship into a single IRB Junior World Championship tournament.

Since 2014, the Fiji under-20 team has been invited to compete at the Australian Youth Rugby Championships, and periodically into the Oceania Rugby U20 Championship, being a participant in 2018, 2019, and 2022.

=== Junior World Championship / Trophy ===
==== Overview ====
- 2008 World Championship: 14th
- 2009 World Championship: 12th
- 2010 World Championship: 8th
- 2011 World Championship: 6th
- 2012 World Championship: 11th
- 2013 World Championship: 11th
- 2014 World Championship: 12th
- 2015 World Trophy: 6th
- 2016 World Trophy: 3rd
- 2017 World Trophy: 6th
- 2018 World Trophy: 1st
- 2019 World Championship: 11th
- 2023 World Championship: 10th

==== 2008 ====
In June 2008 Wales hosted the 2008 IRB Junior World Championship. Fiji lost all of its pool matches, going down to England 41-17 then losing to Australia by 53-17 before going down in a close match against Canada by 10–17. In the 13th-16th Places Playoffs, Fiji beat USA before going down to Tonga and finishing 14th overall out of 16.

==== 2009 ====
In June 2009, Japan hosted the 2009 IRB Junior World Championship. Fiji lost its first two matches against South Africa (36-10) and France (48-25) before defeating Italy by 20–14 with tries to Ledua and Matawalu. Fiji lost out to Scotland in the semifinal playoffs and then losing to Argentina in the 11th place play off and finished overall at 12th position and due to its 12th finish, qualified for the next championship in 2010 which was reduced to 12 teams.

==== 2010 ====
In June 2010, Argentina hosted the 2010 IRB Junior World Championship. Fiji played its first game against 2 times winners New Zealand going down 44–11 with tries to Christopher Nasiganyavi and 2 penalties to Josh Matavesi. They were thumped 31-13 by Wales but accounted for Samoa beating them 15–12. In the 5th place play-off, Fiji were beaten 44-9 by France before losing to Wales again in the 7th place play off by 39-15 and finishing 8th overall.

==== 2011 ====
In June 2011, Italy hosted the 2011 IRB Junior World Championship. Fiji played its first game against France losing 24-12 before getting thrashed 50-25 by Australia. Fiji then went on to beat Tonga 36–18. In the 5th-8th place play-off, Fiji thrashed Wales by 34-20 before getting thrashed by South Africa by 104-17 who scored 14 tries to 2. Even after the loss, Fiji finished at its best ever position of 6th.

== Squads ==
=== 2015 ===
Squad to the 2015 World Rugby Under 20 Trophy:

1. Pateresio Beramaisuva
2. Timoci Bulitavu
3. Jone Jordan Cama
4. Kaveni Dabenaise
5. Waisea Vasuitoga Daroko
6. Filipo Daugunu
7. Rupeni Laganikoro
8. Ratu Josefa Logavatu
9. Eroni Mawi
10. Serupepeli Momo
11. Seveci Nakailagi
12. Peniami Narisia
13. Leone Nawai
14. Ilisavani Nasemira
15. Mateo Qolisese
16. Josaia Raboiliku
17. Tevita Ratuva
18. Viliame Ravouvou
19. Jone Seuvou
20. Asaeli Sorovaki
21. Lekima Tagitagivalu
22. Sela Toga
23. Vatiliai Tuidraki
24. Manuele Tuiqali
25. Seremaia Turagabeci
26. Filimoni Savou

Team Management

- Coach – Viliame Gadolo
- Assistant coach – Kele Leawere
- Technical Trainer – Mosese Rauluni
- Strength & Conditioning Coach - Mathew Dooley
- Team Doctor – Dr Josefa Dakuinamako
- Physio – Talisa Whippy
- Manager – Jone Nute

=== 2014 ===
Fiji Under 20s squad - 2014 IRB Junior World Championship

Forwards

- Veniona Toga
- Aseri Robarobalevu
- Jack Driu
- Apolosi Ranawai
- Simione Naiduki
- Maikeli Sivo
- Glen Osbourne
- Ilisoni Lagi
- Poasa Waqanibau
- Lote Nasiga
- Paula Bukavere
- Marika Tokalauvere
- Antonio Qio
- Aminiasi Naituiyaga
- Vasikali Mudu
- Vincent Sosefo

Backs

- Leone Dawai
- Marika Tivitivi
- Tubuka Vueti
- Elia Murasia
- Josese Kurokava
- Maika Baleinaloto
- Akuila Tabualevu
- Semi Camaisala
- Adrea Cocagi
- Orisi Nawaqaliva
- Aisake Rokobulimaira
- Livinai Tuicakau

Non Travelling Reserves

- Samu Tawake
- Venieli Ratuva
- Jale Uva
- Dion Fraser

Management

- Salimoni Ravouvou - Head Coach
- Paula Biutanaseva - Team Manager
- Iliesa Samusamuvodre - Assistant Coach
- Jennifer Kula - Physiotherapist
- Alipate Navunisaravi - Team Doctor
- Tikiko Namaua - Trainer

== Notable former coaches ==
- (Fiji) Iliesa Tanivula (2010)
- (Fiji) Inoke Male (2011)

== Notable former players ==
- (Fiji) Nikola Matawalu (2009)
- (Fiji) Metuisela Talebula (2009)
- (France) Noa Nakaitaci (2008)
- (Fiji) Maritino Nemani (2010)
- (Fiji) Josh Matavesi (2010)
- (Australia) Tevita Kuridrani (2010)
- (Fiji) Semi Radradra (2011)
- (Australia) Samu Kerevi (2012)
- (Fiji) Ben Volavola (2012)

== See also ==
- Fiji Warriors
- Fiji national rugby union team
