= Bond Sports Park =

Multi-purpose sporting facility in Gold Coast, Australia

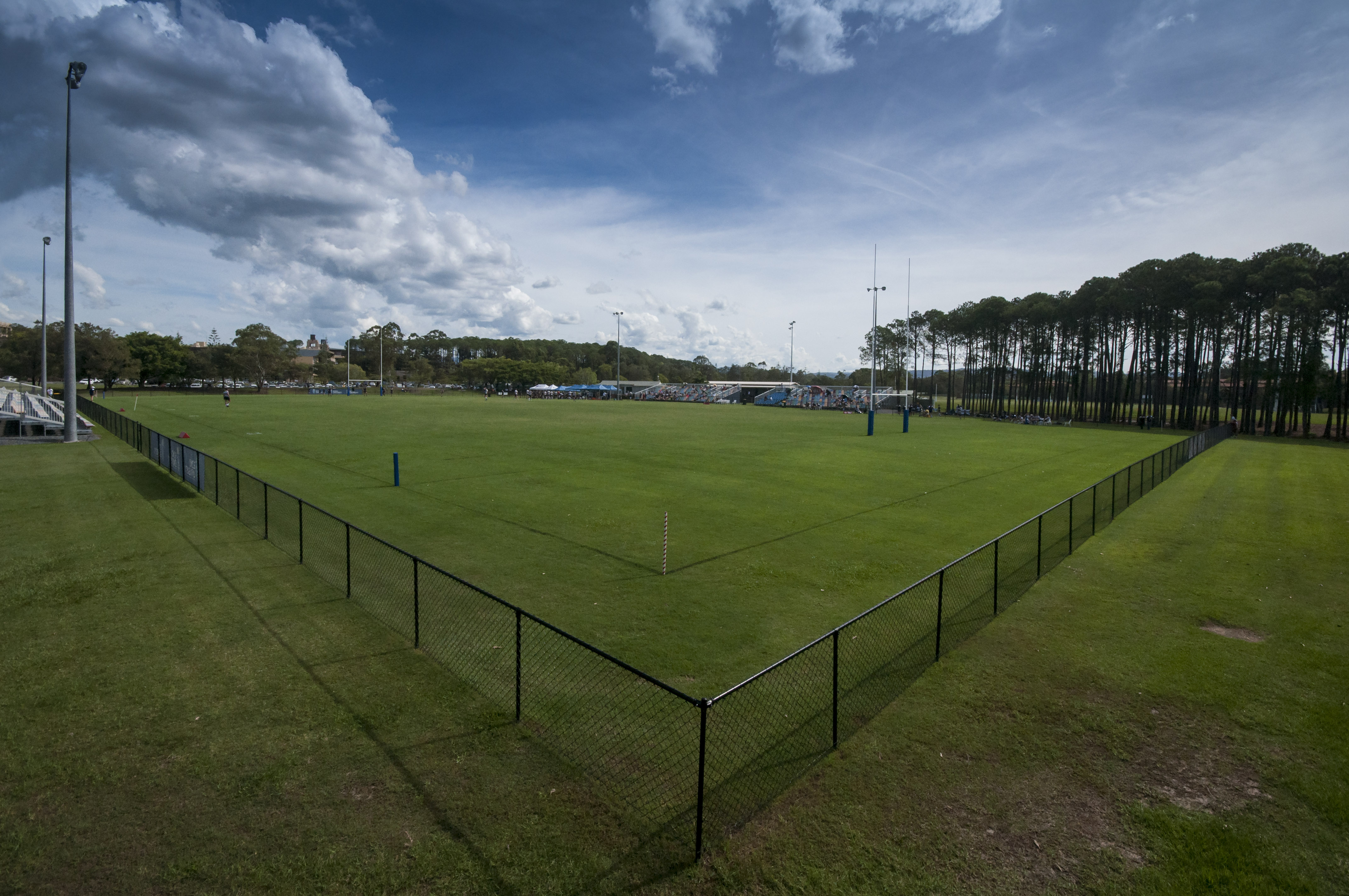
- Interactive map of Bond Sports Park
- Location: Ring Road, Robina, Gold Coast
- Coordinates: 28.071554°S 153.416642°E
- Capacity: Field 1: 5,000 total (1,000 seated); Field 2: 5,000 total (400 seated)
- Surface: Grass

Tenants
- Queensland Country; Bond University Rugby Club; Bond University Bullsharks

Bond Sports Park is a multi-purpose sporting facility on the Gold Coast in Queensland, Australia. The precinct includes a rugby union stadium which has hosted professional and international matches, including National Rugby Championship playoffs and the annual Oceania Rugby Under 20 Championship tournament. It is located on the Bond University campus.

Additional fields are used for Australian rules football and soccer, and there are also volleyball, tennis and squash courts, and practice nets for cricket and golf. All of the courts and fields have lighting suitable for hosting night time events. The main fields have clubhouse facilities and grandstands for spectator events. The sports centre also has a 50m swimming pool and gymnasium.

Field 1 is the Bond Rugby Field. It is the main home ground of the Queensland Country team that plays in the National Rugby Championship, and is also the home ground of the Bond University club that plays in the Queensland Premier Rugby competition.

Field 2, known as the "Shark Tank", is the Australian rules football ground that is home to the Bond University Bullsharks club that plays in the QAFA competition.

Upgrade works were completed in 2013 at the cost of AUD 1 million, with the two main fields levelled, top-dressed and fenced. In addition to the field renovations, grandstand seating recovered from Metricon Stadium was installed, and the two clubhouses were retrofitted with kitchens, meeting rooms, change rooms and offices.

The annual Oceania Rugby Under 20 Championship had been hosted at Bond Rugby Field between 2015 and 2019. It has previously been used as a training base by international rugby union teams including Australia and Argentina as well as the Australian men's and women's sevens teams competing at the Gold Coast Sevens event.
