= World Rugby Junior World Championship =

International rugby union competition

- 2027 World Rugby Junior World Championship; 2026 World Rugby Junior World Championship
- Sport: Rugby union
- Inaugural season: 2008
- Number of teams: 16
- Holders: South Africa (2026)
- Most titles: New Zealand (6 titles)
- Website: world.rugbyu20

The World Rugby Junior World Championship (known as the IRB Junior World Championship until 2014 and World Rugby Under 20 Championship until 2025) is an annual under-20 international rugby union competition. The event is organised by the sport's governing body, World Rugby, and is contested by junior national teams with an under-20 age requirement.

== History ==
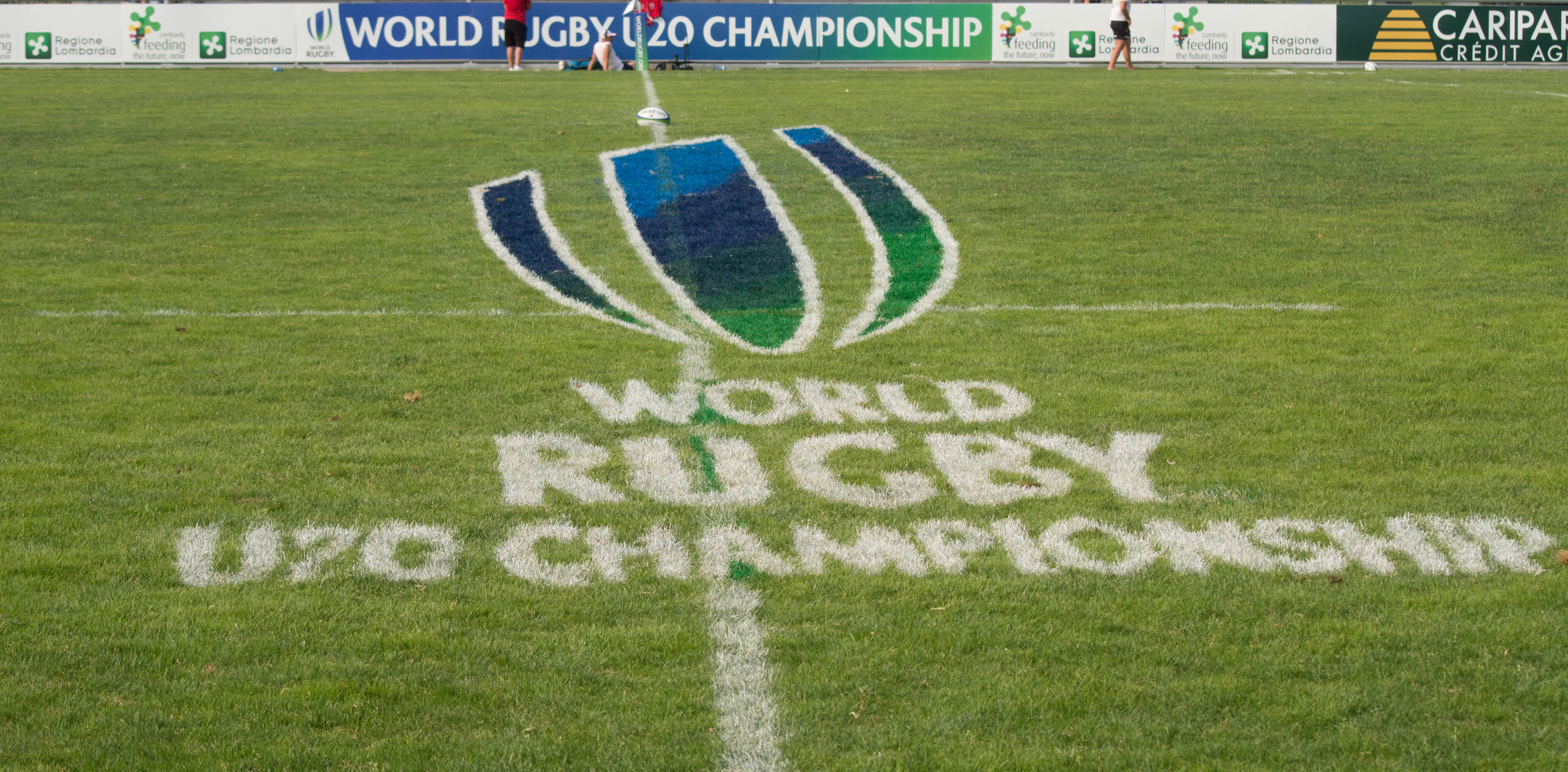
2015 World Rugby U20 Championship was hosted in Italy for the second time, the most of any other European country.

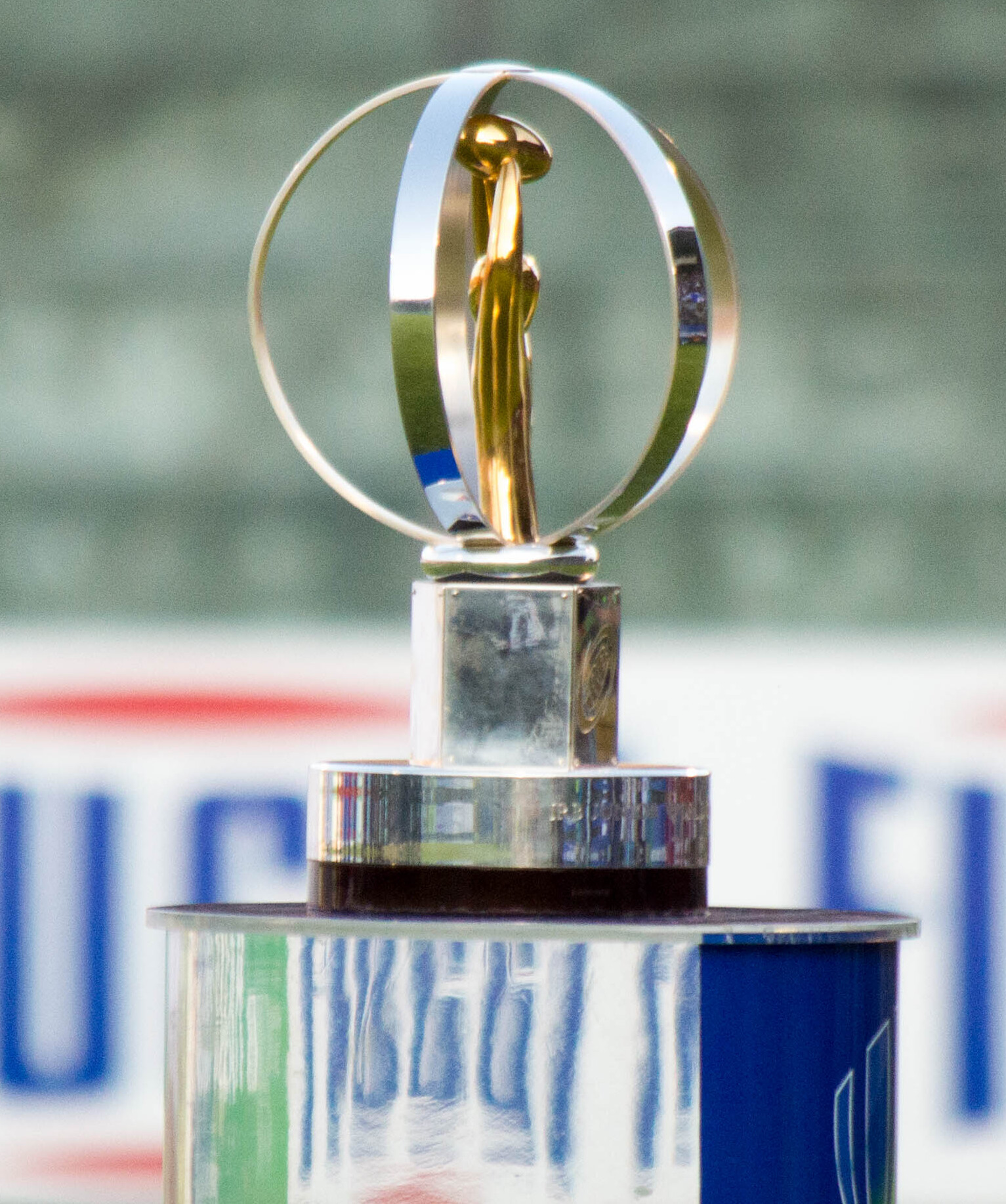
The World Rugby Junior World Championship trophy.

The World Rugby Junior World Championship replaced the IRB's former age-grade world championships, the Under 19 and Under 21 World Championships.

The inaugural tournament was held in June 2008, hosted by Wales and with 16 teams participating. Wales was announced as host for the inaugural tournament in November 2007. The number of participating nations was reduced to 12 before the 2010 tournament due to financial reasons.

The Junior World Championship is the upper level of the World Rugby tournament structure for under-20 national sides. At the same time that the U20 Championship was launched, World Rugby (then known as the International Rugby Board) also launched a second-level competition, the U20 Trophy, featuring eight teams.

Promotion and relegation between the Trophy and the Championship is in place. The winner of the Trophy will play in next year's Championship, while the last placed team at the Championship will be relegated to the Trophy for the next year.

== Results ==
#	Year	Host		Final		Third place match			Teams
#	Year	Host	Winner	Score	Runner-up	3rd place	Score	4th place	Teams
1	2008	Wales	New Zealand	38–3	England	South Africa	43–18	Wales	16
2	2009	Japan	New Zealand	44–28	England	South Africa	32–5	Australia	16
3	2010	Argentina	New Zealand	62–17	Australia	South Africa	27–22	England	12
4	2011	Italy	New Zealand	33–22	England	Australia	30–17	France	12
5	2012	South Africa	South Africa	22–16	New Zealand	Wales	25–17	Argentina	12
6	2013	France	England	23–15	Wales	South Africa	41–34	New Zealand	12
7	2014	New Zealand	England	21–20	South Africa	New Zealand	45–23	Ireland	12
8	2015	Italy	New Zealand	21–16	England	South Africa	31–18	France	12
9	2016	England	England	45–21	Ireland	Argentina	49–19	South Africa	12
10	2017	Georgia	New Zealand	64–17	England	South Africa	37–15	France	12
11	2018	France	France	33–25	England	South Africa	40–30	New Zealand	12
12	2019	Argentina	France	24–23	Australia	South Africa	41–16	Argentina	12
Tournament canceled 2020–2022 due to impacts of the COVID-19 pandemic
13	2023	South Africa	France	50–14	Ireland	South Africa	22–15	England	12
14	2024	South Africa	England	21–13	France	New Zealand	38–24	Ireland	12
15	2025	Italy	South Africa	23–15	New Zealand	Argentina	38–35	France	12
16	2026	Georgia	South Africa	16–5	France	New Zealand	41–26	England	16

== Team records ==
Team	Champions	Runners-up	Third	Fourth	Top 4
New Zealand	6 (2008, 2009, 2010, 2011, 2015, 2017)	2 (2012, 2025)	3 (2014, 2024, 2026)	2 (2013, 2018)	13
England	4 (2013, 2014, 2016, 2024)	6 (2008, 2009, 2011, 2015, 2017, 2018)	—N/a	3 (2010, 2023, 2026)	13
France	3 (2018, 2019, 2023)	2 (2024, 2026)	—N/a	4 (2011, 2015, 2017, 2025)	9
South Africa	3 (2012, 2025, 2026)	1 (2014)	9 (2008, 2009, 2010, 2013, 2015, 2017, 2018, 2019, 2023)	1 (2016)	14
Australia	—N/a	2 (2010, 2019)	1 (2011)	1 (2009)	4
Ireland	—N/a	2 (2016, 2023)	—N/a	2 (2014, 2024)	4
Wales	—N/a	1 (2013)	1 (2012)	1 (2008)	3
Argentina	—N/a	—N/a	2 (2016, 2025)	2 (2012, 2019)	4

== Participating nations ==
Team	2008	2009	2010	2011	2012	2013	2014	2015	2016	2017	2018	2019	2023	2024	2025	2026	2027	Years
Argentina	8th	11th	6th	9th	4th	6th	9th	9th	3rd	11th	6th	4th	9th	5th	3rd	8th	q	17
Australia	5th	4th	2nd	3rd	8th	7th	5th	5th	6th	6th	5th	2nd	5th	6th	5th	7th	q	17
Canada	12th	14th	WT	WT	WT	WT	WT	WT	—N/a	WT	WT	WT	—N/a	—N/a	—N/a	—N/a	—N/a	2
England	2nd	2nd	4th	2nd	7th	1st	1st	2nd	1st	2nd	2nd	5th	4th	1st	6th	4th	q	17
Fiji	14th	12th	8th	6th	11th	11th	12th	WT	WT	WT	WT	11th	10th	12th	—N/a	11th	q	12
France	6th	5th	5th	4th	6th	5th	6th	4th	9th	4th	1st	1st	1st	2nd	4th	2nd	q	17
Georgia	WT	—N/a	—N/a	WT	WT	—N/a	WT	WT	10th	10th	9th	10th	8th	9th	9th	12th	q	9
Ireland	9th	8th	9th	8th	5th	8th	4th	7th	2nd	9th	11th	8th	2nd	4th	11th	9th	q	17
Italy	11th	13th	WT	11th	12th	WT	11th	11th	11th	8th	8th	9th	11th	10th	7th	10th	q	15
Japan	15th	15th	WT	WT	WT	WT	WT	10th	12th	WT	12th	WT	12th	WT	—N/a	13th	q	8
New Zealand	1st	1st	1st	1st	2nd	4th	3rd	1st	5th	1st	4th	7th	7th	3rd	2nd	3rd	q	17
Samoa	7th	7th	12th	WT	10th	9th	8th	12th	WT	12th	WT	—N/a	WT	WT	—N/a	—N/a	—N/a	9
Scotland	10th	9th	10th	10th	9th	10th	10th	8th	8th	5th	10th	12th	WT	WT	10th	5th	q	15
South Africa	3rd	3rd	3rd	5th	1st	3rd	2nd	3rd	4th	3rd	3rd	3rd	3rd	7th	1st	1st	q	17
Spain	—N/a	—N/a	—N/a	—N/a	—N/a	—N/a	—N/a	—N/a	WT	—N/a	—N/a	—N/a	WT	11th	12th	14th	q	4
Tonga	13th	10th	11th	12th	WT	WT	WT	WT	—N/a	—N/a	—N/a	WT	—N/a	—N/a	—N/a	—N/a	—N/a	4
United States	16th	WT	—N/a	WT	WT	12th	WT	—N/a	WT	—N/a	—N/a	—N/a	WT	WT	—N/a	15th	q	4
Uruguay	WT	16th	WT	WT	—N/a	WT	WT	WT	WT	WT	WT	WT	WT	WT	—N/a	16th	q	4
Wales	4th	6th	7th	7th	3rd	2nd	7th	6th	7th	7th	7th	6th	6th	8th	8th	6th	q	17
Total	16	16	12	12	12	12	12	12	12	12	12	12	12	12	12	16	16	

Legend

- = Hosts
- 1st = Champions
- 2nd = Runners-up
- 3rd = Third place
- 4th = Fourth place
- Place = Relegated to World Rugby Under 20 Trophy
- WT = Competed in the World Rugby Under 20 Trophy
- q = Qualified

== World Rugby Junior Player of the Year ==
Year	Name	Nation
2008	Luke Braid	New Zealand
2009	Aaron Cruden	New Zealand
2010	Julian Savea	New Zealand
2011	George Ford	England
2012	Jan Serfontein	South Africa
2013	Sam Davies	Wales
2014	Handré Pollard	South Africa
2015	James Chisholm	England
2016	Max Deegan	Ireland
2017	Juarno Augustus	South Africa
2018	Jordan Joseph	France
2019	Juan Pablo Castro	Argentina
Cancelled 2020–2022
2023	Marko Gazzotti	France

== See also ==
- The Rugby Championship U20 Since 2024
- World Rugby U20 Trophy
