= Tonga national under-20 rugby union team =

Tonga
- Union: Tonga Rugby Union
- Coach: Liueli Fusimalohi
- Captain: Bill Fukofuka
- League: IRB Junior World Rugby Trophy
- 2012: 3
Team kit	Change kit

First international
- Tonga 9–48 New Zealand (6 June 2008)

Largest win
- Tonga 23-3 Samoa (21 June 2010)

Largest defeat
- Australia 67–5 Tonga (9 June 2010)

World Cup
- Appearances: 4 (First in 2008)
- Best result: 10th, 2009

The Tonga national under-20 rugby union team competes in the IRB Junior World Championship since its inception in 2008. It replaced the former under 19 and 21 world championships. They have appeared in every competition since.

In 2014, the Tonga under-20 team was invited to compete at the Australian Under 20 Rugby Championship.

== Squad ==
Squad to the 2015 World Rugby Under 20 Trophy:

1. Fangtua Taimikovi
2. Mesuilame Tufui
3. Tanginoa Halainoua
4. Puniani Malafu
5. Sosaia (Fine) Tokai
6. Siaosi Tonga
7. Patelesio Oneone - Vice Captain
8. Feliuaki Halaifonua
9. Tuihakavalu Ika
10. Taliauli Sikuea
11. Petelo Fatai
12. Semisi (Sitani) Tei
13. Sione Vailanu
14. Nikola Latuhoi
15. Ikapote Tupai
16. Filipine Vakapuna
17. Meimeite Siale
18. Alefosio Tatola
19. Timote Tai
20. Melino Samate
21. Johnathan Taliauli
22. Joseph Tongotea
23. Bill Fukofuka - Captain
24. Samson Fualalo
25. Mataiasi Fakautoki
26. Siaosi (George) Taina

Team Management

- Coach - Liueli Fusimalohi
- Assistant Coach - Ofa Topeni
- Manager - Antonino Latu
- Team Doctor - Penisimani Poloniati
- Strength & Conditioning Coach - Tavake Fangupo
- Physio - Mavae Otumuli
