= Samoa national under-20 rugby union team =

Samoa Under-20s
- Union: Samoa Rugby Union
- Coach: (Samoa) Semo Sititi
Team kit

First international
- Samoa 29–17 Scotland (6 June 2008)

Largest win
- Samoa 48–11 United States (24 May 2011)

Largest defeat
- Wales 74–3 Samoa (12 June 2012)

World Cup
- Appearances: 5 (First in 2008)
- Best result: 7th, 2008 & 2009

The Samoa under-20 rugby union team is Samoa's junior national team. They represent Samoa at the IRB Junior World Championship. After the 2010 Junior World Championship they were relegated to the Junior World Rugby Trophy for second tier nations. They were later promoted to the 2012 Junior World Championship after finishing as winners of the 2011 IRB Junior World Rugby Trophy. The team also competes at the Oceania U20 Championship as of 2015.

== Squad ==
Samoa U20 Squad - 2014 IRB Junior World Championship

Forwards

- Fereti Eteuati
- Louis Tulolo Kapeteni
- Andrew Lemalu
- Anthony Lemalu
- Etimani Sului
- Ieremia Mataena
- Leif Schwenke
- Ezra Meleisea
- Cameron Skelton
- Giovanni Habel Kueffner
- Lakisipone Lee
- Richard Mariota
- Alamanda Motuga
- Henry Stowers
- Gordon Langkilde

Backs

- Mark Tavai
- Johan Fagasua
- Penaia Penaia
- Paul Ah Him
- Nathaniel Apa
- William Talataina Mu
- Aukuso Tuitama
- Joseph Ikenasio
- Luteru Laulala
- Harry Luteru
- Nuu Nuu
- Johnny Samuelu

=== Management ===
- Semo Sititi – Head coach
- Andy Ripley – Team manager
- Robert Johnston – Assistant coach
- Orene Ai'i – Assistant coach
- Joshua Ioane – Physiotherapist
- Neru Leavasa – Team doctor
- Andrew Clark – Technical assistant
- Jed Knox – Trainer

== Wins against Tier 1 nations ==
6 June 2008	Samoa	29–17	Scotland	Racecourse Ground, Wrexham, Wales

5 June 2009	Samoa	17–14	Scotland	Chichibunomiya Rugby Stadium, Tokyo, Japan
	Try: Selesele 5' c, Faimoa 58' c Con: Laulala (2/2); Drop: Wilson 80'		Try: Dunbar 50' m Pen: Horne (3/4) 33', 38', 46'	Referee: Andrew Small (England)

21 June 2009	Ireland	3–9	Samoa	Chichibunomiya Rugby Stadium, Tokyo, Japan
	Pen: Sefo 26', Leleisiuao 37', Laulala 68'		Pen: McKinley 4'	Referee: Pascal Gaüzère (France)

23 June 2013	Samoa	33–24	Scotland	Stade Pascal Laporte, Nantes
15:00	Try: Nanai (2) 5' m, 10' c Slater 29' m Fonoti 72' c Con: Alatimu (2/4) 11', 73'; Pen: Alatimu (3/3) 22', 46', 76'	Report	Try: Allan 13' c Hoyland 16' c Fergusson 63' c Con: Allan (3/3) 14', 17', 64'; Pen: Allan (1/3) 26'	Referee: Luke Pearce (England)

6 June 2014	Scotland	18–27	Samoa	ECOLight Stadium, Pukekohe
13:35	Try: Farndale 37' m Pecquer 51' m Ritchie 72' m Pen: Hutchinson (1/2) 19'	Report	Try: Kueffner 24' c Apa 43' c Mu 47' c Con: Mu (3/3) 25', 44', 48'; Pen: Mu (2/2) 5', 69'	Referee: Angus Gardner (Australia)

10 June 2015	Italy	24–30	Samoa	Stadio San Michele, Calvisano
18:30	Try: Leger 4'c Falaniko 20' c Tuiomanufili 69' c Con: Falaniko (3/3) 5', 21', 71'; Pen: Falaniko (3/3) 15', 35', 59'	Stats	Try: Giammarioli 2' c Polledri 31' m Ferraro 44' c Zanetti 51' m Con: Minozzi (2/4) 3', 45'	Referee: Will Houston (Australia)

== Full internationals ==
2008: Alatasi Tupou, Maselino Paulo, Roysiu Tolufale (2008), Misioka Timoteo, Afa Aiono, Semiperive Semeane (2009), Richard Muagututia, Levi Asifa'amatala (2010), Fa'atoina Autagavaia (2012), Vavae Tuilagi (2015)
2009: Falemiga Selesele (2010), Fa'atiga Lemalu, Viliamu Afatia (2012), Uini Atonio (2014, France)
2010: Steven Luatua (2013, New Zealand), Patrick Fa'apale, Tulolo Tulolo, Vaiofaga Simanu (2014)
2011: Robert Lilomaiava, Ropeti Lafo (2012), Vavao Afemai, Oneone Fa'afou (2014), Will Skelton (2014, Australia)
2012: Aniseko Sio (2014)
