= 2026 World Rugby Under 20 Challenger Cup =

Under 20 rugby union championship

World Rugby Under 20 Challenger Cup
Tournament details
- Host: Chile
- Venue: Centro de Alto Rendimiento del Rugby, La Reina
- Date: 2–17 October 2026
- Teams: 8

Final positions
- Champions: Chile (1st title)
- Runner-up: Belgium
- Third place: Portugal
- Fourth place: Romania

Tournament statistics
- Matches played: 16

The 2026 World Rugby U20 Challenger Cup is the second-tier age-grade rugby competition. The tournament was held in Chile for the third time at the 1,500 capacity Centro de Alto Rendimiento del Rugby (CARR) in La Reina.

The tournament was held in Centro de Alto Rendimiento del Rugby, La Reina, Santiago Metropolitan Region with all games broadcast by RugbyPassTV.

== Qualified teams ==
With the expansion of the U20 Rugby World Cup from 12 to 16 teams, it saw the promotion of the USA, Japan, and Uruguay in addition to champions Scotland. This meant the tournament saw the return of a number of nations, as well as the debut for Belgium's U20 side.

A total of eight teams will take part; including the hosts Chile. The remaining seven countries qualified through a qualification process in regional competitions from North America, South America, Europe, Africa, and Asia.

Host (1)

- Chile

Asia Rugby (1)

- Hong Kong

Rugby Africa (1)

- Namibia

Sudamérica Rugby (1)

- Brazil

Rugby Americas North (1)

- Canada

Rugby Europe (3)

- Belgium
- Portugal
- Romania

== Pool stage ==
=== Pool A ===
Pos	Team	Pld	W	D	L	PF	PA	PD	TF	TA	TB	LB	Pts	Qualification
1	Chile (H)	3	3	0	0	213	35	+178	31	4	3	0	15	Advance to Final
2	Romania	3	2	0	1	65	98	−33	9	13	2	0	10	
3	Brazil	3	1	0	2	55	117	−62	8	0	1	1	6	
4	Hong Kong	3	0	0	3	51	134	−83	8	21	0	1	1	

Updated to match(es) played on 13 Oct 2026. Source: World Rugby
(H) Host

2 October
10:00 CLST (UTC-03)

Romania	27–26	Brazil
	Report

Centro de Alto Rendimiento Parque Mahuida, Santiago

2 October
19:00 CLST (UTC-03)

Chile	83–19	Hong Kong
	Report

Centro de Alto Rendimiento Parque Mahuida, Santiago

7 October
13:00 CLST (UTC-03)

Hong Kong	10–22	Brazil
	Report

Centro de Alto Rendimiento Parque Mahuida, Santiago

7 October
19:00 CLST (UTC-03)

Chile	50–9	Romania
	Report

Centro de Alto Rendimiento Parque Mahuida, Santiago

12 October
10:00 CLST (UTC-03)

Romania	29–22	Hong Kong

Centro de Alto Rendimiento Parque Mahuida, Santiago

12 October
19:00 CLST (UTC-03)

Chile	80–7	Brazil

Centro de Alto Rendimiento Parque Mahuida, Santiago

=== Pool B ===
Pos	Team	Pld	W	D	L	PF	PA	PD	TF	TA	TB	LB	Pts	Qualification
1	Belgium	3	3	0	0	110	51	+59	14	7	2	0	14	Advance to Final
2	Portugal	3	2	0	1	112	60	+52	17	9	2	1	11	
3	Canada	3	1	0	2	109	73	+36	21	8	2	1	7	
4	Namibia	3	0	0	3	40	211	−171	5	33	0	0	0	

Updated to match(es) played on 13 Oct 2026. Source: World Rugby

2 October
13:00 CLST (UTC-03)

Namibia	6–95	Canada
	Report

Centro de Alto Rendimiento Parque Mahuida, Santiago

2 October
16:00 CLST (UTC-03)

Belgium	22–15	Portugal
	Report

Centro de Alto Rendimiento Parque Mahuida, Santiago

7 October
10:00 CLST (UTC-03)

Namibia	12–69	Portugal
	Report

Centro de Alto Rendimiento Parque Mahuida, Santiago

7 October
16:00 CLST (UTC-03)

Belgium	41–14	Canada
	Report

Centro de Alto Rendimiento Parque Mahuida, Santiago

12 October
13:00 CLST (UTC-03)

Canada	26–28	Portugal

Centro de Alto Rendimiento Parque Mahuida, Santiago

12 October
16:00 CLST (UTC-03)

Belgium	47–22	Namibia

Centro de Alto Rendimiento Parque Mahuida, Santiago

== Knockout stage ==
=== 7th place playoff ===
17 October
10:00 CLST (UTC-03)

Hong Kong	5–53	Namibia

Centro de Alto Rendimiento Parque Mahuida, Santiago

=== 5th place playoff ===
17 October
13:00 CLST (UTC-03)

Brazil	24–61	Canada

Centro de Alto Rendimiento Parque Mahuida, Santiago

=== 3rd place playoff ===
17 October
16:00 CLST (UTC-03)

Romania	13–67	Portugal

Centro de Alto Rendimiento Parque Mahuida, Santiago

=== Final ===
17 October
19:00 CLST (UTC-03)

Chile	30–17	Belgium

Centro de Alto Rendimiento Parque Mahuida, Santiago

== See also ==
- 2026 World Rugby U20 Championship
