= Uhrig =

Uhrig is a surname. Notable people with the surname include:

- Götz Uhrig, German theoretical physicist
- Michelle Uhrig (born 1996), German speed skater
- Peter Uhrig (born 1965), German lightweight rower
- Robert Uhrig (1903–1944), German communist and resistance fighter against National Socialism
- Romina Uhrig (born 1988), Argentine politician
