= 2014 South American Junior Rugby Championship "A" =

- Date: September 14 – September 20 2014
- Countries: Brazil; Chile; Paraguay; Uruguay
- Champions: Uruguay (1st title)

Tournament statistics
- Matches played: 6

The 2014 South American Junior Rugby Championship (Sudamérica Rugby (CONSUR) Championship) Division A was the first edition of the newly formatted South American Junior Rugby Championship for Under-19 national teams. It was held in Montevideo, Uruguay from September 14 to September 20. The top 4 nations of South America play the tournament.

Uruguay was the champion had to play for the Junior CONSUR Cup against Argentina.

The tournament served as CONSUR's qualifier for the 2015 World Rugby Under 20 Trophy to be held in Portugal.

== Standings ==
Qualifies to U20 Rugby Trophy & Junior CONSUR Cup

| Place | Nation | Games | | | | Points | | | Table points |
| Place | Nation | played | won | drawn | lost | for | against | diff | Table points |
|---|---|---|---|---|---|---|---|---|---|
| 1 | Uruguay | 3 | 3 | 0 | 0 | 126 | 17 | +109 | 9 |
| 2 | Chile | 3 | 2 | 0 | 1 | 42 | 33 | +9 | 6 |
| 3 | Brazil | 3 | 1 | 0 | 2 | 33 | 80 | –47 | 3 |
| 4 | Paraguay | 3 | 0 | 0 | 3 | 33 | 104 | –71 | 0 |

== Matches ==
=== First round ===
14 September 2014
14:00 UYT (UTC-03)

| Brazil | 0–18 | Chile |
| | Report |

Old Christians, Montevideo
Referee: Claudio Cattivelli (Uruguay)

14 September 2014
16:00 UYT (UTC-03)

| Paraguay | 0–64 | Uruguay |
| | Report |

Old Christians, Montevideo
Referee: Felipe Balbontín (Chile)

=== Second round ===
17 September 2014
14:00 UYT (UTC-03)

| Chile | 12–11 | Paraguay |
| | Report |

Old Boys, Montevideo
Referee: Ricardo Sant'Anna (Brazil)

17 September 2014
16:00 UYT (UTC-03)

| Uruguay | 40–5 | Brazil |
| | Report |

Old Boys, Montevideo
Referee: Esteban Filipanics (Argentina)

=== Third round ===
20 September 2014
13:00 UYT (UTC-03)

| Brazil | 28–22 | Paraguay |
| | Report |

Estadio Charrúa, Montevideo
Referee: Francisco González (Uruguay)

20 September 2014
16:00 UYT (UTC-03)

| Uruguay | 22–12 | Chile |
| | Report |

Estadio Charrúa, Montevideo
Referee: Ignacio Iparraguirre (Argentina)

== Junior CONSUR Cup ==
It was the first edition between the 2014 champions Uruguay against the 2013 champions Argentina. The Pumitas won 67-3.

11 October 2014
11:00 UYT (UTC-03)

| Uruguay | 3–67 | Argentina |
| | Report |

Estadio Charrúa, Montevideo
Referee: Henrique Platais (Brazil)

== See also ==
- South American Junior Rugby Championship
