= Bautista Mascia =

Uruguayan singer (born 1996)

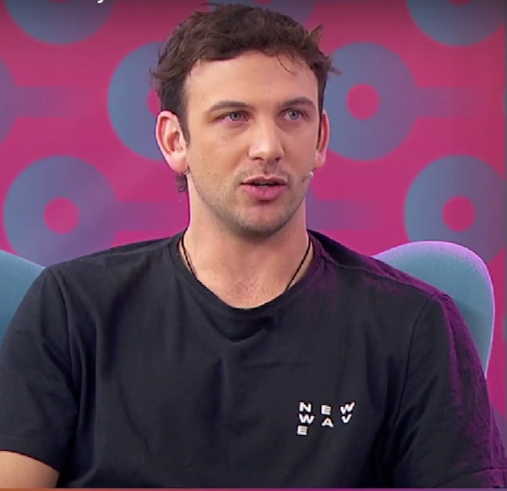
- Mascia in 2023
- Born: Bautista Mascia Paysée; 25 November 1996 (age 29); Montevideo, Uruguay
- Occupations: Singer; songwriter; rugby player; television personality
- Years active: 2013–present
- Musical career
- Genres: Latin pop; cumbia; cumbia pop
- Instruments: Vocals; guitar
- Label: Sony Latin

Bautista Mascia Paysée (born 25 November 1996) is a Uruguayan singer, songwriter, former rugby union player and television personality. He is known for being a vocalist and guitarist of the band Toco Para Vos and for winning the eleventh season of the reality television series Gran Hermano.

== Early life ==
Mascia was born in Montevideo on 25 November 1996 to a Uruguayan mother, María Paysée, and an Argentine father. He is of Italian decent and has three siblings, including professional footballer Juan Cruz Mascia. He was raised in the Carrasco neighborhood, where he attended Stella Maris College and played rugby for the school's club, Old Christians Club. He was the nephew-in-law of Gustavo Zerbino, survivor of Uruguayan Air Force Flight 571, who was married to his maternal aunt.

== Career ==
=== Playing career ===
Mascia began playing rugby at a young age, on his school team, Old Christians Club. As a teenager he joined the Uruguay national under-20 rugby union team, playing as a winger. With his country he became champion of the 2015 South American Junior Rugby Championship "A" and participated in the 2016 World Rugby Under 20 Trophy held in Zimbabwe.

=== Music career ===
In 2013 he formed the cumbia pop band Toco Para Vos with some friends, adding his cousin María "Meri" Deal as lead vocalist. The band, with Mascia as composer, guitarist and vocalist, released the singles "Hasta la luna", "Solo necesito" and "De vez en cuando", which quickly gained success. In 2015 he signed with the Warner Music label, achieved international success and toured in countries in the region such as Argentina and Chile.

In October 2020, Mascia launched his solo career, with the release of "Piloto", an EP composed of six songs combining trap, R&B and acoustic pop. In the following months he released the singles "Tu Chongo de Turno 2.0", "Donald", "Cofee" with Chule Von Wernich and "De ti pa mí". In July 2021 he released his single "Peaky Blinder", along with the music video, and later that year, "Quién Diría", with Argentine singer José Giménez Zapiola. In 2022 his album Estoy bien earned him a Graffiti Award nomination for Best Pop Album.

On December 14, 2023, he released the single "Ya no me duele" featuring DJ Cele Arrabal. In late May 2024, while still isolated in the Gran Hermano house, "Los mejores días," a three-song EP, was released.

In late August 2024, he released "Muero x decírtelo", his first single after winning Gran Hermano. The music video starred Denisse González, a contestant in the reality show and Mascia's girlfriend since then. In mid-September he performed to sold-out audiences at the Teatro Gran Rex in Buenos Aires and at the Montevideo Music Box in Montevideo. In October he released the Uruguayan cumbia and Cordoban cuarteto single "Que Te Vuelva Amor", featuring the Argentine duo DesaKTa2.

On December 1, 2024 he performed as a guest artist at Lenny Kravitz's concert at Montevideo's Estadio Centenario. On December 17, after 10 years of the release of the original version, he released a remix of the Toco Para Vos single "Hasta la Luna", featuring The La Planta, Márama, Meri Deal and Q´Lokura. On June 12, 2025, he released "Mi Ex", featuring Rombai vocalist Fer Vázquez.

=== Television career ===
In December 2023 he became one of the 22 selected for the eleventh season of the television reality show Gran Hermano Argentina.
