= Gran Hermano (Argentine TV series) season 11 =

Gran Hermano
- Season 11
- Gran Hermano season 11 promotional poster
- Presented by: Santiago del Moro
- No. of days: 210
- No. of housemates: 29
- Winner: Bautista Mascia
- Runner-up: Emmanuel Vich
- No. of episodes: 65

Release
- Original network: Telefe
- Original release: 11 December 2023 – 8 July 2024

Season chronology
- ← Previous; Season 10 Next → Season 12

The eleventh season of the Argentine version of the television reality show Gran Hermano was announced on 26 March 2023, by Telefe. It is the second continuous season to air on Telefe after previously airing on América TV in 2016, as the show made its return to the original network Telefe in 2022.

Santiago del Moro continues as the show's host. The show follows a group of contestants (known as HouseGuests), who live in a house together while being constantly filmed and having no communication with the outside world as they compete to win a grand prize. Each week, the HouseGuests compete in a Head of Household (HoH) competition which gives them immunity from nominations and the power to save one of the nominees up for eviction. On eviction night, the audience votes to evict one of the nominees.

The season premiered on 11 December 2023, and ran for 210 days, with the season ending on 7 July 2024, becoming the longest edition to date.

Bautista Mascia was crowned the winner of the season, with Emmanuel Vich finishing as runner-up and Nicolás Grosman in third place.

On 3 July 2024, Gran Hermano was renewed by Telefe for a twelfth season.

== Format ==
The show follows a group of contestants, known as HouseGuests, who live inside a custom-built house outfitted with cameras and microphones recording their every move 24 hours a day. The HouseGuests are sequestered with no contact with the outside world. During their stay, the HouseGuests share their thoughts on their day-to-day lives inside the house in a private room known as the Diary Room. Each week, the HouseGuests compete in competitions to win power and safety inside the house. At the start of each week, the HouseGuests compete in a Head of Household (abbreviated as "HOH") competition. The winner of the HoH competition is immune from eviction and selects another HouseGuest to be saved for eviction. On eviction night, the audience vote to evict one of the nominees, and the nominee with the most votes is evicted from the house.

=== Format changes and additions ===
==== The Final Vote ====
From week 2 onwards, the Final Vote (voto final in Spanish) was enabled by Gran Hermano, which gives the last evicted HouseGuest the power to nominate another HouseGuest with two points.

==== Red Phone ====
During Week 5, Gran Hermano installed a red phone in the house. Whoever answered the phone would receive positive or negative information. The HouseGuests must answer the phone without being able to repeat it during the day and if the phone is not answered before five rings the whole house would be punished.

Week	Call	Message	Answered by	Chosen
5	1	You are nominated.	Zoe	none
5	2	You won immunity.	Juliana	none
5	3	You must nominate a HouseGuest.	Rosina	Lisandro
6	4	You must choose a HouseGuest, so that together you cannot participate in the Head of Household Competition. (Note: The HouseGuest will not know what they have been chosen for.)	Agostina	Nicolás
6	5	You are nominated.	Lucía	none
7	6	You are all nominated.	Joel	none
9	7	You must nominate three HouseGuests.	Martín	Bautista, Emmanuel, Nicolás
11	8	You are evicted. (Note: The HouseGuest will spend 24 hours spying on their fellow Housemates before returning to the house.)	Agostina	none
13	9	You have won immunity for next week and you must nominate two HouseGuests. (Note: If the HouseGuest who answered the phone is evicted, then they must give their immunity to another HouseGuest. In addition, the two HouseGuests that are nominated are eligible to be saved by the Head of Household.)	Joel	Martín, Nicolás
15	10	You must choose a HouseGuest (new or re-entry) to participate in the motorcycle game.	Martín	Catalina
18	11	You have won dinner for two.	Emmanuel	Zoe
18	11	Next week, your votes will count as doubled. (Note: If the HouseGuest who answered the phone is evicted, then they must give their power to another HouseGuest.)	Emmanuel	none
18	11	You must nominate two HouseGuests. (Note: The two HouseGuests that are nominated are eligible to be saved by the Head of Household.)	Emmanuel	Mauro, Paloma
20	12	You will watch all of the nominations.	Bautista	none
21	13	You have won dinner with two HouseGuests of your choosing. (Note: The three HouseGuests are free to discuss nominations. In addition, the rest of the house will be able to spy on their dinner without their knowledge.)	Nicolás	Bautista, Martín
21	13	You must nominate one HouseGuest.	Nicolás	Darío
24	14	Next week, your votes will count as doubled.	Florencia R.	none
29	15	You must nominate or be nominated. (Note: The HouseGuest who is nominated will be banned from the final Head of Household competition.)	Bautista	Himself

==== Positive nominations ====
In Week 7, it was announced that all HouseGuests were nominated for eviction, with HouseGuests voting on who they wanted to save rather than face eviction. The three HouseGuests who would receive the most votes would be saved along with the Head of Household.

==== Repechage ====
During Week 12, all HouseGuests who were previously evicted from the house participated in a repechage, with only three returning to the house. As Carla walked from the house she was the only ineligible to participate. On Day 77, it was announced that Catalina, Isabel and Joel were voted by the public to return.

==== Relatives ====
In Week 23, family and friends from the remaining nine HouseGuests moved into the house to participate for a prize. During that week, all HouseGuests and their relatives nominated, with only the HouseGuests's relatives being eligible to be nominated. The relative who received the fewest votes to save on eviction night, would be evicted, along with the HouseGuest they represented. In Week 24, the public voted for their favorite relative, with two of them being evicted on Day 164 and another two on Day 168. On two occasions relatives were evicted via twist, with one being evicted due to an envelope that was delivered by evictee Catalina, and another one being evicted by the Head of Household.

== HouseGuests ==
A total of 20 HouseGuests moved into the house on Day 1 (11 December 2023), while the last two moved into on Day 2 (12 December 2023). A new HouseGuest, Virginia Demo, entered the house on Day 39 (18 January 2024). Former evicted HouseGuests Catalina Gorostidi, Isabel Denegri and Joel Ojeda returned to the house on Day 77 (25 February 2024). Another five new HouseGuests (Damián Moya, Darío Martínez, Florencia Regidor, Mauro D'Alessio and Paloma Méndez) entered the house on Day 85 (4 March 2024), in addition to the returns of former evicted HouseGuests Sabrina Cortez and Denisse González. On Day 121 (9 April 2024), it was announced that former season 10 HouseGuest Constanza Romero would enter the house as a replacement via the Golden Ticket.

Name	Age	Occupation	Residence	Day entered	Day exited	Status
Bautista Mascia	27	Musician	Montevideo, Uruguay	2	210	Winner
Emmanuel Vich	31	Hairdresser	Córdoba, Córdoba	1	210	Runner-up
Nicolás Grosman	21	Administration student	Ramos Mejía, Buenos Aires	1	210	Third place
Darío Martínez	57	Car dealer	La Plata, Buenos Aires	85	203	Evicted
Martín Ku	24	Personal trainer	Viedma, Río Negro	1	196	Evicted
Juliana Scaglione	32	Sportswoman	Belgrano, Buenos Aires	1	191	Evicted
Virginia Demo	55	Comedian	La Plata, Buenos Aires	39	182	Evicted
Florencia Regidor	21	Model	Temperley, Buenos Aires	85	175	Evicted
Zoe Bögach	20	Unemployed	Recoleta, Buenos Aires	1	161	Evicted
Mauro D'Alessio	27	Marketing manager	Villa Urquiza, Buenos Aires	85	154	Evicted
Federico Farías	24	Singer	San Miguel de Tucumán, Tucumán	1	147	Evicted
Constanza Romero	21	Kinesiology student	Caá Catí, Corrientes	121	140	Evicted
Paloma Méndez	21	Photographer	Martínez, Buenos Aires	85	133	Evicted
Damián Moya	27	Dancer	El Palomar, Buenos Aires	85	126	Evicted
Catalina Gorostidi	31	Pediatrician	Santa Fe, Santa Fe	1	35	Evicted
Catalina Gorostidi	31	Pediatrician	Santa Fe, Santa Fe	77	120	Evicted
Joel Ojeda	31	Flight attendant	San Miguel, Buenos Aires	1	64	Evicted
Joel Ojeda	31	Flight attendant	San Miguel, Buenos Aires	77	113	Evicted
Rosina Beltrán	26	Personal trainer	Buceo, Montevideo, Uruguay	1	105	Evicted
Denisse González	21	Law student	Trelew, Chubut	1	50	Evicted
Denisse González	21	Law student	Trelew, Chubut	85	98	Evicted
Sabrina Cortez	29	Accountant	Mendoza, Mendoza	2	56	Evicted
Sabrina Cortez	29	Accountant	Mendoza, Mendoza	85	91	Evicted
Isabel Denegri	65	Sommelier	La Plata, Buenos Aires	1	28	Evicted
Isabel Denegri	65	Sommelier	La Plata, Buenos Aires	77	88	Ejected
Agostina Spinelli	34	Police woman	San Fernando, Buenos Aires	1	85	Walked
Lisandro Navarro	35	Financial assistant	Lomas de Zamora, Buenos Aires	1	84	Evicted
Lucía Maidana	22	Football player	Salta, Salta	1	70	Evicted
Alan Simone	27	Farmer	Chivilcoy, Buenos Aires	1	50	Evicted
Florencia Cabrera	34	Fashion designer	Lomas de Zamora, Buenos Aires	1	42	Evicted
Carla Di Stéfano	46	Lawyer	Villa Adelina, Buenos Aires	1	37	Walked
Williams López	20	Farmer	Corrientes, Corrientes	1	22	Evicted
Axel Klekaylo	23	Water purifier installer	Posadas, Misiones	1	15	Evicted
Hernán Otivero	30	Blacksmith	Río Cuarto, Córdoba	1	7	Evicted

=== Relatives ===
==== First entry ====
On Day 155 (13 May 2024), relatives from each one of the nine remaining HouseGuests that were in competition at the time entered the house.

Name	Age	Occupation	Relationship	Day entered	Day exited	Status
Delfina Casal	23	Public relations	Virginia's daughter	155	171	Winner
Facundo Chen	25	Surgical technologist student	Martin's friend	155	170	Evicted
Franco Mascia	26	Rugby union player	Bautista's brother	155	168	Evicted
Francisco Martínez Corti	28	Medical student	Darío's son	155	168	Evicted
Noelia Martínez	51	Singer	Emmanuel's friend	155	165	Evicted
Mateo Zarlenga	19	Unemployed	Nicolás' friend	155	164	Evicted
Sol García	20	Tourism student	Florencia's friend	155	164	Evicted
Aixa Abasto	45	Housewife	Zoe's mother	155	161	Evicted
Rocío Correa	29	Sportswoman	Juliana's friend	155	158	Evicted

==== Second entry ====
On Day 183 (10 June 2024), relatives from each one of the six remaining HouseGuests that were in competition at the time entered the house.

Name	Occupation	Relationship	Day entered	Day exited	Status
Nicolás Suárez	Air Force military	Emmanuel's husband	183	186	Winner
Emma Paysse	Student	Bautista's cousin	183	186	Evicted
María Sosa	English teacher	Martin's girlfriend	183	185	Evicted
Antonella Dell'aquila	English teacher	Nicolás's mother	183	185	Evicted
Sofía Martínez	Lawyer	Darío's daughter	183	184	Evicted
Georgina Scaglione	Housewife	Juliana's sister	183	184	Walked

=== Special guests ===
Name	Information	Secret/Mission	Day entered	Day exited
Santiago del Moro	Show's host	Have dinner with the HouseGuests and bring them the one-word messages that their families sent them.	51	
Santiago del Moro	Show's host	Have dinner with the HouseGuests, present the car game, and present photos that their families have sent them.	144	
Santiago del Moro	Show's host	Have dinner with the final three and unlock the mystery suitcase.	206	
Romina Uhrig	Season 10 housemate	Teach them how to organize and clean the house. She also had the power to nominate like a regular HouseGuest.	57	63
Walter Santiago	Season 10 housemate	Had the power to nominate like a regular HouseGuest.	106	108
Ariel Ansaldo	Season 10 housemate	Had the power to nominate like a regular HouseGuest.	107	113

== Episodes ==
No. overall	No. in season	Title	Day(s)	Original release date	HH rating (Note: Audience averages are measured only in the Greater Buenos Aires area, according to data from Kantar Ibope Media.)
Week 1
303	1	"Premiere"	Day 1	11 December 2023	20.5
Twenty HouseGuests were presented to the public and entered the house on Day 1.
304	2	"1st Nomination Gala"	Days 1–3	13 December 2023	16.4
On Day 2, two remaining HouseGuests (Bautista and Sabrina) entered the house. For the HoH competition, the HouseGuests had to balance on a spring-based platform connected to an unstable bracket in which they had to keep a ball inside. Sabrina won the competition and became the first Head of Household. On Day 3, Catalina, Hernán, Juliana and Zoe were nominated for eviction.
305	3	"1st Eviction Gala"	Days 4–7	17 December 2023	13.2
Following the nomination ceremony, Sabrina chose to save Catalina from eviction and nominating Williams on Day 4, leaving Hernán, Juliana, Williams and Zoe up for eviction. For the first weekly test for the house's budget, HouseGuests in pairs had to ride a bike for 24 hours to keep a positive energy bar in which they could not speed below 20 kilometers per hour. They ultimately lost the test and got half of the budget to go to the supermarket. Zoe was the first nominated HouseGuest saved from eviction receiving the fewest votes. After being faced against Juliana, Hernán was finally the first evicted from the house.
Week 2
306	4	"2nd Nomination Gala"	Days 8–10	20 December 2023	13.6
During the debate on Day 8, Hernán gave his Final Vote to Joel. On Day 9, for the HoH competition the HouseGuests had to maintain their balance by holding a stick that contained a can at its end and in turn they had to pass through a seesaw, some iron structures and a ramp, which hindered their passage, to finally place it on an unstable high surface; If the can was dropped, they had to start all over again. The first three contestants to do it went on to the final (Agostina, Martín and Alan). The final consisted of the same game but this time they had to place three cans on top of each other, with Martin becoming the winner. On Day 10, Axel, Carla, Catalina and Juliana were nominated for eviction.
307	5	"2nd Eviction Gala"	Days 11–15	25 December 2023	16.6
After the nomination, Martín attempted to save Axel from eviction and nominating Agostina on Day 11, leaving Agostina, Carla, Catalina and Juliana up for eviction; but as punishment for discussing the salvation earlier, Martín's choice of saving Axel from being nominated was nulled. For the weekly test for the house's budget, HouseGuests had to decorate puzzles for donation to children for Christmas and pack them within 12 hours. They finally won the test and got the full budget to go to the supermarket. On Day 15, Agostina was the first nominated HouseGuest saved from eviction receiving the fewest votes, followed by Carla and Catalina. After being faced against Juliana, Axel was finally evicted from the house.
Week 3
308	6	"3rd Nomination Gala"	Days 16–17	27 December 2023	16.5
During the debate on Day 16, Axel gave his Final Vote to Carla. On the same day, for the HoH competition the HouseGuests had to compete in pairs and stand on a diagonal platform and hold a rope for the longest time and avoid to cross a red line which marked the limit to stand firm; if they exceeded it they would be disqualified. The two remaining HouseGuests were Alan and Martín, which competed against each other, with Martín becoming the winner. On Day 10 Carla, Florencia C., Lisandro and Sabrina were nominated for eviction, joined by Juliana and Williams after they were punished due to a confrontation that included violent attitudes.
309	7	"3rd Eviction Gala"	Days 18–22	1 January 2024	14.2
For the weekly test for the house's budget, HouseGuests had to use dominoes to create a path, which is marked with tape throughout the house, and then make fall all of them simultaneously within 90 minutes. At the end, the last piece had to touch a red button, if the fall effect is not continued or the button is not touched, the test would be lost. Juliana refused to participate and they were punished with an addition of 30 minutes to their time spent on the test. They later won the test and got the full budget for the week. On Day 22, Carla was the first nominated HouseGuest saved from eviction receiving the fewest votes, followed by Florencia C., Catalina, Sabrina and Lisandro. After being faced against Juliana and Lisandro, Williams was finally evicted from the house.
Week 4
310	8	"4th Nomination Gala"	Days 23–24	3 January 2024	16.6
On Day 23, during the debate Williams gave his Final Vote to Carla. Simultaneously, for the HoH competition the HouseGuests had to find coloured balls inside a ballplayer, climb the stairs and throw six of them from the heights into a thin basket in groups of four. Alan, Isabel, Juliana and Nicolás advanced to the final and competed together, with Alan becoming the winner. On Day 24, Carla, Florencia C., Isabel and Lisandro were nominated for eviction, joined by Nicolás after he was punished for speaking without a microphone earlier.
311	9	"4th Eviction Gala"	Days 25–28	7 January 2024	16.9
For the house's budget weekly test, the HouseGuests had to be kept intertwined by ropes in five groups (four of four people and one of three) for 24 hours; they finally won the test. On Day 28, Rosina was the first nominated HouseGuest saved from eviction receiving the fewest votes, followed by Florencia C. and Nicolás. After being faced against Carla, Isabel was finally evicted from the house.
Week 5
312	10	"5th Nomination Gala"	Days 29–31	10 January 2024	15.6
On Day 29, Isabel gave her Final Vote to Catalina. Meanwhile, for the HoH competition the HouseGuests had to fit pieces, with sharp-angled shapes, on a bridge of short stature. Once that segment was finished, they had to take a ball and throw it on a beam above them, which had a downward slope, and dunk it into a basket; which previously had to be placed correctly to achieve it. Lisandro and Martín advanced to the final, with Martín becoming the winner. ‘’Gran Hermano’’ installed a red phone in the house to send positive or negative information to the HouseGuests. Zoe answered the phone and was automatically nominated for eviction. Juliana also answered but won immunity for the week. She later was punished for announcing her intention to use the Special Nomination and was banned from nominating; Carla was later punished for the same reason. Rosina answered the Red Phone and was given the power to nominate someone without the possibility of being saved by the HoH, choosing Lisandro. On Day 31, Agostina, Carla, Catalina and Emmanuel were nominated for eviction, joined by Alan (after he was punished for speaking without a microphone), Lisandro and Zoe.
313	11	"5th Eviction Gala"	Days 32–35	14 January 2024	18.2
For the budget test, HouseGuests had to move from hand to hand the largest number of tokens in the shape of astronauts from a wall (which simulates a rocket) to an identical one; At the same time, they had to hold on to a spinning circle, in the shape of a moon, which had foot supports and handles. To do this, they took tiles placed them on a harness and then passed it to the next player who proceeded in the same way until the end, in less than 10 minutes; they lost the test and received half of the budget. On Day 32, Martín saved Carla, and nominated Sabrina for eviction. On Day 35, Zoe was saved from eviction receiving the fewest votes, followed by Lisandro, Sabrina, Agostina and Emmanuel. Catalina was finally evicted from the house after being faced against Alan.
Week 6
314	12	"6th Nomination Gala"	Days 36–38	17 January 2024	17.8
On Day 36, Catalina gave her Final Vote to Emmanuel. The HouseGuests faced each other for the HoH competition, in which they had to go through three levels of difficulty that consisted of moving rectangular pieces on a board to be able to free tangled ropes, in addition these ropes had at the beginning a circular figure that had to be lowered to its end to prove that they were really released, with each time they finished a board they moved on to the next level. Denisse, Joel, Lisandro and Sabrina faced each other in the final, with Lisandro becoming the winner. Agostina and Nicolás were ineligible to become HoH after she answered the Red Phone, and Lucía was nominated for eviction for answering the phone too. On Day 37, Carla decided to walk out of the house. On Day 38, Agostina, Emmanuel, Florencia C. and Martín were nominated for eviction.
315	13	"6th Eviction Gala"	Days 39–42	21 January 2024	18.1
For the budget test, HouseGuests had to replicate a popping choreography with the song "Los Tontos"; they won the test and received the full budget for the supermarket. On Day 39, Lisandro saved Martín, and nominated Joel for eviction. On Day 42, Joel was saved from eviction receiving the fewest votes, followed by Lucía and Emmanuel. Florencia C. was finally evicted from the house after being faced against Agostina.
Week 7
316	14	"7th Nomination Gala"	Days 43–45	24 January 2024	16.1
On Day 43, Florencia C. gave her Final Vote to Joel. For the HoH competition, the HouseGuests had to hold a crane through its handlebars, which contained weights, to keep a ball inside a cylinder (placed at one end of the crane and at a height) without it falling. Agostina, Emmannuel, Lucía and Virginia faced each other in the final, with Agostina becoming the winner. Later, Joel answered the Red Phone and it was announced that all HouseGuests were automatically nominated for eviction this week. Only the HoH and three other HouseGuests would be saved from eviction; They were also required to nominate positive, with the three HouseGuests with the most positive votes to be safe along with the HoH.
317	15	"7th Eviction Gala (Part 1)"	Days 46–49	28 January 2024	17.6
On Day 46, For the budget test, HouseGuests had to catch a ball that would fall from a slide on the garden several times during the day within 10 seconds; they finally lost the test. On Day 39, Lisandro saved Martín, and nominated Joel for eviction. On Day 49, it was announced that there would be two evicted this week. All HouseGuests were saved except Alan, Denisse and Sabrina.
318	16	"7th Eviction Gala (Part 2)"	Days 46–50	29 January 2024	17.3
On Day 50, Alan and Denisse were both evicted, leaving Sabrina as the last saved HouseGuest.
Week 8
319	17	"8th Nomination Gala"	Days 51–52	31 January 2024	16.8
On Day 51, during the debate both Alan and Denisse gave their final votes to Nicolás. Simultaneously, for the HoH competition the HouseGuests had to operate a giant pinball through two side ropes to put three balls (which they previously had to enter one at a time through the upper end) into jars containing the same game. Joel and Martín advanced to the final and competed together, with Martín becoming the winner. On the same day, host Santiago del Moro entered the house to have dinner with the HouseGuests and bring them one-word messages that their families sent them. On Day 52, Agostina, Emmanuel, Federico, Joel, Juliana, Lisandro, Nicolás and Sabrina were nominated for eviction.
320	18	"8th Eviction Gala"	Days 53–56	4 February 2024	17.2
For the house's budget weekly test, the HouseGuests had to find a bottle with a phrase in it, in a big bucket of ice with 30 bottles inside, in 30 minutes; they finally won the test. On Day 53, Martín saved Juliana and put Virginia up for eviction. On Day 56, Joel was the first nominated HouseGuest saved from eviction receiving the fewest votes. After being faced against Agostina and Federico, Sabrina was finally evicted from the house.
Week 9
321	19	"9th Nomination Gala"	Days 57–59	7 February 2024	17.5
On Day 57, Sabrina gave her Final Vote to Federico. On Day 58, for the HoH competition the HouseGuests had to rearrange the pieces on a board according to their color and place them in five different columns. Joel, Juliana and Virginia advanced to the final, with Juliana becoming the winner. Later, season 10 contestant Romina Uhrig entered as a Special Guest to teach them how to organize and clean the house. She also had the power to nominate like a regular HouseGuest. On Day 59, Agostina, Joel, Martín, and Virginia were nominated for eviction, joined by Bautista, Emmanuel and Nicolás after they were nominated by Martín due to him answering the Red Phone.
322	20	"9th Eviction Gala (Part 1)"	Days 60–63	11 February 2024	13.5
Following the nomination ceremony, Juliana chose to save Agostina from eviction and nominating Lisandro on Day 60. For the weekly test for the house's budget, HouseGuests had to memorize several objects from the arena in 10 minutes, and were called individually to the Diary Room to answer questions about them Romina also participated for the test. After answering 100 questions correctly, they won the test. On Day 63, Lisandro was the first nominated HouseGuest saved from eviction receiving the fewest votes, and Romina left the house after six days in. All nominated HouseGuests were saved during the gala except Joel and Virginia.
323	21	"9th Eviction Gala (Part 2)"	Days 60–64	12 February 2024	17.7
On Day 64, Joel was evicted from the house, leaving Virginia safe.
Week 10
324	22	"10th Nomination Gala"	Days 65–66	14 February 2024	17.9
On Day 65, Joel gave his Final Vote to Lisandro. On the same day, for the HoH competition the HouseGuests had to hold a liquid in a measuring cylinder, which was hanging high, covering the hole it had at its base with a finger of their right hand. The goal was to prevent the liquid from reaching line zero. The last HouseGuest who managed to keep liquid above line zero would win, with Agostina becoming the winner. Lucía, Rosina, and Zoe were automatically nominated for eviction as punishment for communicating with the outside world. On Day 66, Emmanuel, Federico, Juliana, Lisandro, Martín and Virginia were also nominated for eviction.
325	23	"10th Eviction Gala"	Days 67–70	18 February 2024	19.2
Following the nomination ceremony, Agostina chose to save Virginia from eviction and nominating Nicolás on Day 67. For the weekly test for the house's budget, HouseGuests had to remain on top of a bed for 8 hours without being able to get off, eat or go to the bathroom during the aforementioned time, which they later won. On Day 70, Nicolás was the first nominated HouseGuest saved from eviction receiving the fewest votes. After being faced against Juliana and Lisandro, Lucía was finally evicted from the house.
Week 11
326	24	"Re-Entry Gala"	Days 71–77	25 February 2024	20.5
On Day 77, the public had to vote for three ex-HouseGuests to re-enter the house. Former evicted HouseGuests Catalina, Isabel and Joel later returned to the house after receiving the most votes.
Week 12
327	25	"11th Nomination Gala"	Days 78–80	28 February 2024	18.8
On Day 78, during the debate Lucía gave her final vote to Lisandro. Simultaneously, for the HoH competition the HouseGuests had to cross a giant maze to find a ball and come out and place it on a lectern. Once the challenge was achieved, they had to press a red button marking its completion in the shortest amount of time possible, with Nicolás later becoming the winner. Juliana was automatically nominated for eviction as punishment for refusing to wear her microphone and refusing to go to the Diary Room alongside Isabel for sharing information from the outside world. On Day 80, Agostina, Bautista, Joel and Lisandro were also nominated for eviction.
328	26	"11th Eviction Gala"	Days 81–84	3 March 2024	21.0
After losing the house's budget weekly test on day 81, Nicolás saved Bautista and put Virginia up for eviction on the next day. On Day 84, Joel was the first nominated HouseGuest saved from eviction receiving the fewest votes. After being faced against Juliana, Lisandro was finally evicted from the house.
Week 13
329	27	"2nd Re-Entry and New HouseGuests Entry Gala"	Day 85	4 March 2024	21.8
On Day 85, five new HouseGuests entered the house (Damián, Darío, Florencia R., Mauro and Paloma), while former evicted HouseGuests Denisse and Sabrina also entered through two special Golden Tickets as they finished in fourth and fifth place, respectively, in the re-entry vote back on Week 11.
330	28	"12th Nomination Gala"	Days 85–87	6 March 2024	16.9
On Day 86, during the debate Lisandro gave his final vote to Emmanuel. Meanwhile, for the HoH competition the HouseGuests had to face a large board full of various pictures. When a picture of a product was shown on the screen, each of the HouseGuests had to act quickly to position themselves on the same image on the board. Emmanuel was the winner of the competition. After answering the Red Phone, Joel won immunity from the following week's eviction and the power to nominate two HouseGuests for eviction, choosing Martín and Nicolás. On Day 87, Bautista, Isabel and Sabrina were also nominated for eviction.
331	29	"12th Eviction Gala"	Days 88–91	10 March 2024	17.0
After losing the house's budget weekly test again on day 88, Nicolás saved Martín and put Catalina up for eviction. Isabel was ejected from the house by Gran Hermano on the same day due to continuously sharing information from the outside world after various warnings. On Day 91, Nicolás was the first nominated HouseGuest saved from eviction receiving the fewest votes. After being faced against Catalina, Sabrina was finally evicted from the house.
Week 14
332	30	"13th Nomination Gala"	Days 92–94	13 March 2024	17.7
On Day 92, Sabrina gave her Final Vote to Denisse. For the HoH competition, the HouseGuests had to build a 1.80-meter tower with dividers, and make it stand still for five seconds. Martín and Zoe faced Joel and Darío in the final, with the first ones becoming the winners. On Day 94, Bautista, Damián, Darío, Denisse and Florencia R. were also nominated for eviction.
333	31	"13th Eviction Gala"	Days 95–98	17 March 2024	18.4
As the HouseGuests did not win the weekly budget test, they only received half of budget for the supermarket. On Day 95, Martín and Zoe saved Florencia R., and nominated Nicolás and Mauro for eviction. On Day 98, Darío was saved from eviction receiving the fewest votes, followed by Bautista, Nicolás and Mauro. Denisse was finally evicted from the house after being faced against Damián.
Week 15
334	32	"14th Nomination Gala"	Days 99–101	20 March 2024	18.7
During the debate on Day 99, Denisse gave her Final Vote to Catalina. On the same day, for the HoH competition the HouseGuests had to stand on a movable platform and with some rods they had to "fish" four blocks of different shapes and place them on another table with the corresponding holes. Bautista, Damián, Juliana and Nicolás competed against each other, with Bautista becoming the winner. Lisandro returned to the house in a freeze challenge to give three HouseGuests a chance to pick one of the three gold envelopes. Emmanuel opened the envelope that would double his votes for the week, Martín opened the one that would nominate him, and Rosina got the one that gave her only one vote for the week's nomination. Catalina and Rosina were automatically nominated for eviction as punishment for talking when Lisandro returned to the house. Emmanuel, Joel and Nicolás were also nominated for speaking without their microphones. On Day 101, Damián, Darío, Florencia R., Mauro and Paloma were also nominated for eviction.
335	33	"14th Eviction Gala"	Days 102–105	24 March 2024	18.7
After losing the budget test, the HouseGuests received half of the budget. Agostina returned to the house in another freeze challenge to give three HouseGuests a chance to pick one of the three purple envelopes choosing Catalina, Damián and Joel. Catalina won a dinner with another HouseGuest, Damián got nominated for the following week, and Joel won immunity from eviction. On Day 102, Bautista saved Nicolás, and nominated Virginia for eviction. On Day 105, Virginia was saved from eviction receiving the fewest votes, followed by Martín, Darío, Paloma, Emmanuel, Mauro, Damián and Florencia R.; Rosina was finally evicted from the house after being faced against Catalina.
Week 16
336	34	"15th Nomination Gala"	Days 106–108	27 March 2024	17.5
On Day 106, season 10 contestant Walter Santiago entered as a special guest with the power to nominate like a regular HouseGuest, with season 10 contestant Ariel Ansaldo entering on the next day with the same power. Rosina gave her final vote to Mauro, and for the HoH competition the HouseGuests had to advance on a beam suspended above the floor, with the objective of placing three shapes on the other edge of the walkway in the shortest time possible, with Paloma becoming the winner. Walter was given a Power Nomination and chose Catalina, but was nulled after he chose to leave the house. On Day 108, Damián, Emmanuel, Florencia R., Joel and Mauro were nominated for eviction.
337	35	"15th Eviction Gala"	Days 109–113	1 April 2024	18.7
After losing the house's budget weekly test for the fourth consecutive week on day 109, Paloma saved Florencia R. and put Darío up for eviction. This was later nulled as punishment for discussing the salvation. On Day 113, Damián was the first nominated HouseGuest saved from eviction receiving the fewest votes. After being faced against Emmanuel, Joel was finally evicted from the house and Ariel left the house.
Week 17
338	36	"16th Nomination Gala"	Days 114–115	3 April 2024	18.8
339	37	"16th Eviction Gala (Part 1)"	Days 116–119	7 April 2024	18.5
340	38	"16th Eviction Gala (Part 2)"	Days 116–120	8 April 2024	22.3
Week 18
341	39	"17th Nomination Gala"	Days 121–122	10 April 2024	16.1
342	40	"17th Eviction Gala"	Days 123–126	14 April 2024	18.0
Week 19
343	41	"18th Nomination Gala"	Days 127–129	17 April 2024	17.5
344	42	"18th Eviction Gala"	Days 130–133	21 April 2024	17.4
Week 20
345	43	"19th Nomination Gala"	Days 134–135	23 April 2024	17.1
346	44	"19th Eviction Gala"	Days 136–140	28 April 2024	18.5
Week 21
347	45	"20th Nomination Gala"	Days 141–143	1 May 2024	17.3
348	46	"20th Eviction Gala"	Days 144–147	5 May 2024	20.1
Week 22
349	47	"21st Nomination Gala"	Days 148–150	8 May 2024	16.7
350	48	"21st Eviction Gala"	Days 151–154	12 May 2024	19.0
Week 23
351	49	"Visitors 1st Entry Gala"	Day 155	13 May 2024	17.8
Relatives from each one of the nine remaining HouseGuests that were in competition at the time entered the house to compete for a house.
352	50	"22nd Nomination Gala"	Days 155–157	15 May 2024	15.3
On Day 155, during the debate Mauro gave his final vote to Noelia. Meanwhile, Facundo won the HoH competition. On Day 157, Francisco, Mateo, Noelia and Sol were nominated for eviction.
353	51	"22nd Eviction Gala"	Days 158–161	19 May 2024	18.4
After losing the house's budget weekly test again on day 158, Facundo saved Mateo and put Aixa and Delfina up for eviction. As Juliana read the envelope that was brought by Catalina's visit to the house, her friend Rocío was evicted on the same day. On Day 161, Noelia was the first nominated HouseGuest saved from eviction receiving the most votes. After being faced against Sol (and Florencia R.), Aixa was finally evicted from the house with her daughter Zoe.
Week 24
354	52	"Visitors' 1st Evicion Gala"	Days 162–164	22 May 2024	15.9
After all visitors were up for eviction, Mateo and Sol were finally evicted by receiving the fewest votes for saving.
355	53	"Visitors' 2nd Evicion Gala"	Days 165–168	26 May 2024	16.7
After winning the HoH competition on the previous week, Bautista had to choose a visitor to evict. By Bautista's choice, Noelia was evicted on Day 165. All visitors were still up for eviction, with Francisco and Franco being later evicted on Day 168 by receiving the fewest votes for saving.
Week 25
356	54	"23rd Nomination Gala"	Days 169–171	29 May 2024	17.4
On Day 170, after being faced against Facundo, Delfina became the winner of the HouseGuests’ relatives with the most votes, making Virginia the new HoH. On Day 171, Bautista, Darío, Emmanuel, Martín and Nicolás were nominated for eviction, joined by Juliana after she was previously punished on Week 22.
357	55	"23rd Eviction Gala"	Days 172–175	2 June 2024	18.5
As the HouseGuests won the weekly budget test, they received the full budget for the supermarket. On Day 172, Virginia saved Martín, and nominated Florencia R. for eviction. On Day 175, Darío was saved from eviction receiving the fewest votes, followed by Bautista and Emmanuel. Florencia R. was finally evicted from the house after being faced against Juliana and Nicolás.
Week 26
358	56	"24th Nomination Gala"	Days 176–178	5 June 2024	17.0
For this week, the remaining HouseGuests did not nominate and instead all previously evicted HouseGuests (including those who walked or got ejected) participated on the nomination process. On Day 178, Darío, Emmanuel, Juliana, Nicolás and Virginia were nominated for eviction.
359	57	"24th Eviction Gala"	Days 179–182	9 June 2024	20.3
On day 179, Martín saved Darío and put Bautista up for eviction. On Day 182, Bautista was the first nominated HouseGuest saved from eviction receiving the fewest votes. After being faced against Juliana, Virginia was finally evicted from the house.
Week 27
360	58	"Visitors 2nd Entry Gala"	Day 183	10 June 2024	16.6
Relatives from each one of the six remaining HouseGuests that were in competition at the time entered the house to compete for a house and Virginia gives her final vote to Darío.
361	59	"25th Nomination Gala"	Days 183–185	12 June 2024	15.3
On Day 184, Darío won the HoH competition, Georgina decides to leave the competition, and Sofía is evicted. On the next day, Emmanuel, Martín and Nicolás were nominated for eviction alongside Juliana, while Antonella and María become the evicted visitors of the night.
362	60	"25th Eviction Gala (Part 1)"	Days 186–190	17 June 2024	16.6
On Day 186, Darío decides to save Nicolás and put Bautista up for eviction. Emma and Nicolás S. face each other, with Nicolás S. becoming the last visitor to leave the house, making his partner Emmanuel the new HoH for the next week. On Day 190, it was announced that the eviction would resolve on the next day.
363	61	"25th Eviction Gala (Part 2)"	Days 186–191	18 June 2024	18.9
On Day 191, Juliana is finally evicted from the house, leaving Bautista, Emmanuel and Martín safe.
Week 28
364	62	"26th Nomination Gala"	Day 192	19 June 2024	18.2
Juliana gave her final vote to Darío, and Darío, Martín and Nicolás were nominated for eviction.
365	63	"26th Eviction Gala"	Days 193–196	23 June 2024	16.1
On Day 193, Emmanuel saved Darío and put Bautista up for eviction. On Day 196, Bautista was again the first nominated HouseGuest saved from eviction receiving the fewest votes. After being faced against Nicolás, Martín was finally evicted from the house.
Week 29
366	64	"27th Eviction Gala"	Days 197–203	30 June 2024	15.5
As Bautista answered the Red Phone and had to choose to either nominate or be nominated for eviction, he chose to nominate himself and therefore was banned from the final HoH competitio, which was later won by Nicolás whom became the first finalist of the season. Meanwhile, the remaining HouseGuests Darío and Emmanuel were also nominated for eviction alongside Bautista. On Day 203, Darío was evicted from the house, with Bautista and Emmanuel becoming the other two finalists.
Week 30
378	65	"Final Gala"	Days 204–210 Various (Note: In the final episode, the HouseGuests that made it to the finale looked back over their time in the house. Flashbacks include clips from previous days in the house.)	7 July 2024	19.5
After 210 days, Bautista was crowned the winner of the season, with Emmanuel as the runner-up and Nicolás in third place.

== Voting history ==
HouseGuests nominate for two and one points, shown in descending order in the nomination box. The four or more HouseGuests with the most nomination points face the public vote.

HouseGuests can also use the Diary Room's Special Nomination, which gives three and two points instead. From week 2 onwards, the Final Vote (voto final in Spanish) was enabled by Gran Hermano, which gives the last evicted HouseGuest the power to nominate another HouseGuest with two points.

Starting in Week 14, the Power Nomination (fulminante in Spanish) was enabled by Gran Hermano, which consists of the automatic nomination of a HouseGuest, without the ability to be saved by the Head of Household. It could only be used once by each HouseGuest throughout those weeks. HouseGuests that use the Power Nomination are marked in bold.

Color key:

Winner
Runner-up
Third place
Head of Household
Nominated for eviction
Immune from eviction
Not eligible to vote
Evicted
Walked
Ejected by Gran Hermano
Special Nomination
Received Final Vote
Positive Nomination

Voting history (season 11)
	Week 1	Week 2	Week 3	Week 4	Week 5	Week 6	Week 7	Week 8	Week 9	Week 10	Week 11	Week 12	Week 13	Week 14	Week 15	Week 16	Week 17	Week 18	Week 19	Week 20	Week 21	Week 22	Week 23	Week 24		Week 25		Week 26	Week 27	Week 28	Week 29	Week 30	Nomination points received
	Week 1	Week 2	Week 3	Week 4	Week 5	Week 6	Week 7	Week 8	Week 9	Week 10	Week 11	Week 12	Week 13	Week 14	Week 15	Week 16	Week 17	Week 18	Week 19	Week 20	Week 21	Week 22	Week 23	Day 161	Day 164	Day 168	Day 171	Week 26	Week 27	Week 28	Week 29	Finale	Nomination points received
Head(s) of Household	Sabrina	Martín	Martín	Alan	Martín	Lisandro	Agostina	Martín	Juliana	Agostina	Martín	Nicolás	Emmanuel	Martín, Zoe	Bautista	Paloma	Bautista, Martín	~~Emmanuel~~; Federico	Bautista	Virginia	~~Bautista~~; Virginia	Zoe	Facundo	Bautista		none	Virginia	Martín	Darío	Emmanuel	Nicolás	none	Nomination points received
Final Vote	none	Joel	Carla	Carla	Catalina	Emmanuel	Joel	Nicolás (2)	Federico	Lisandro	none	Lisandro	Joel	~~Denisse~~	~~Catalina~~	Mauro	Juliana	Martín	~~Bautista~~	Emmanuel	Federico	Bautista	Noelia	none			Martín	none	~~Darío~~	Darío	none		Nomination points received
Bautista	Juliana, Catalina	~~Juliana~~, Carla	Carla, Catalina	Carla, Catalina	Carla, Catalina	Florencia C., Agostina	Denisse, Nicolás	Joel, Emmanuel	Virginia, Emmanuel	Emmanuel, Virginia	No nominations	Virginia, Catalina	Virginia, Isabel	Darío, Florencia R.	Damián, Florencia R.	Joel, Mauro	Virginia, ~~Federico~~	Damián, Darío	~~Paloma~~, ~~Federico~~	Emmanuel, Darío	Federico, Florencia R.	Darío, Mauro	Sol, Francisco	Head of Household	Noelia to evict	No nominations	Dario, Emmanuel	No nominations	Emmanuel, Nicolás	Nicolás, Martín	Nominated	**Winner** (Day 210)	64
Emmanuel	Juliana, Hernán	Rosina, Lisandro	Florencia C., Agostina	Lisandro, Denisse	Agostina, Catalina	Agostina, Martín	Joel, Lucía	Juliana, Lisandro	Martín, Bautista	Virginia, Bautista	No nominations	Bautista, Lisandro	Isabel, Sabrina	Bautista, Mauro	Damián (4), Mauro (2)	Catalina, Florencia R.	**Catalina**	Mauro, Paloma	~~Constanza (6)~~, ~~Virginia (4)~~	Bautista, ~~Constanza~~	Mauro, Nicolás	Mauro, Florencia R.	Sol, Francisco	No nominations	No nominations	No nominations	Bautista, Nicolás	No nominations	Martín, Nicolás	Darío, Nicolás	Nominated	**Runner-up** (Day 210)	101
Nicolás	Juliana, Hernán	Florencia C., Juliana	Florencia C., Carla	Banned	Catalina, Carla	Emmanuel, Agostina	Virginia, Lisandro	Juliana, Agostina	Joel, Virginia	Virginia, Emmanuel	No nominations	Joel, Virginia	Joel, Sabrina	Damián, Darío	Damián, Mauro	Joel, Mauro	Emmanuel, Juliana	Constanza, Damián	~~Federico~~, ~~Emmanuel~~	Federico, Emmanuel	Federico, Zoe	Emmanuel, Mauro	Noelia, Rocio	No nominations	No nominations	No nominations	Emmanuel, Darío	No nominations	Emmanuel, Martín	Martín, Bautista	Head of Household	**Third place** (Day 210)	50
Darío	Not in House												Exempt	Florencia R., Damián	Damián, Federico	Florencia R., Emmanuel	Emmanuel, Nicolás	Martín, Nicolás	~~Florencia R.~~, ~~Paloma~~	Florencia R., Emmanuel	Nicolás, Martín	Martín, Bautista	Sol, Noelia	No nominations	No nominations	No nominations	Nicolás, Bautista	No nominations	Nicolás, Bautista	Martín, Bautista	Nominated	Evicted (Day 203)	62
Martín	Zoe, Carla	Catalina, Carla	Florencia C., Agostina	Carla, Florencia C.	Catalina, Carla	Florencia C., Agostina	Nicolás, Denisse	Federico, Emmanuel	Joel, Virginia	Federico, Virginia	Head of Household	Joel, Virginia	Sabrina, Joel	Florencia R., Damián	Damián, Florencia R.	Joel, Florencia R.	~~Federico~~, ~~Zoe~~	Juliana, Zoe	~~Virginia~~, ~~Federico~~	~~Darío~~, ~~Zoe~~	Federico, Florencia R.	Florencia R., Mauro	Noelia, Rocío	No nominations	No nominations	No nominations	Darío, Florencia R.	Head of Household	Bautista, Nicolás	Nicolás, Bautista	Evicted (Day 196)		74
Juliana	Denisse, Zoe	~~Sabrina~~, Axel	Banned	Lisandro, Isabel	Banned	Florencia C., Agostina	Lucía, Federico	Sabrina, Virginia	Emmanuel, Federico	Lisandro, Virginia	No nominations	Banned	Sabrina, Bautista	**Denisse**	Florencia R., ~~Bautista~~	Darío, Joel	Florencia R., Mauro	~~Martín~~, Constanza	~~Martín~~, ~~Constanza~~	~~Constanza~~, Martín	Nicolás, Martín	Mauro, Darío	Noelia, Sol	No nominations	No nominations	No nominations	Emmanuel, Martín	No nominations	Martín, Emmanuel	Evicted (Day 191)			67
Virginia	Not in House						Nicolás, Lisandro	Juliana, Agostina	Martín, Lisandro	Martín, Emmanuel	No nominations	Lisandro, Bautista	Martín, Bautista	Damián, Bautista	Mauro, Damián	Emmanuel, Mauro	~~Juliana~~, Emmanuel	~~Martín~~, Juliana	~~Martín~~, ~~Constanza~~	Bautista, Martín	Nicolás, Martín	Mauro, Nicolás	Mateo, Franco	No nominations	No nominations	No nominations	Nicolás, Bautista	No nominations	Evicted (Day 182)				50
Florencia R.	Not in House												Exempt	Bautista, Darío	Damián, Darío	Emmanuel, Joel	Emmanuel, ~~Juliana~~	**Emmanuel**	~~Emmanuel~~, ~~Martín~~	Juliana, ~~Constanza~~	Mauro, Martín	Darío, Mauro	Francisco, Noelia	No nominations	No nominations	No nominations	Bautista (4), Martín (2)	Darío, Bautista	Evicted (Day 175)				36
Zoe	Williams, Axel	Juliana, Agostina	Florencia C., Carla	Isabel, Florencia C.	Carla, Emmanuel	Florencia C., Emmanuel	Rosina, Lucía	Lisandro, Agostina	Agostinia, Martín	Virginia, Juliana	No nominations	Martín, ~~Lisandro~~	Isabel, Martín	Darío, Mauro	Mauro, Damián	Mauro, Emmanuel	~~Juliana~~, ~~Martín~~	~~Martín~~, Damián	~~Emmanuel~~, ~~Constanza~~	Juliana, Constanza	Virginia, Martín	Mauro, Emmanuel	Noelia, Francisco	Evicted (Day 161)				Darío, Virginia	Evicted (Day 161)				13
Mauro	Not in House												Exempt	Catalina, Rosina	Emmanuel, Virginia	Emmanuel, Joel	Federico, Zoe	Paloma, Constanza	~~Constanza~~, ~~Martín~~	Constanza, Emmanuel	Florencia R., Emmanuel	Martín, Emmanuel	Evicted (Day 154)					Emmanuel, ~~Martín~~	Evicted (Day 154)				43
Federico	Catalina, Juliana	Juliana, Florencia C.	Carla, Florencia C.	Carla, Florencia C.	Agostina, Rosina	Martín, Agostina	Juliana, Joel	Virginia, Sabrina	Martín, Agostina	Martín, Juliana	No nominations	Bautista, Agostina	Bautista, Sabrina	Bautista, Damián	Florencia R., Mauro	Emmanuel, Florencia R.	~~Juliana~~, Emmanuel	Constanza, Martín	~~Martín~~, ~~Nicolás~~	~~Constanza~~, Martín	Nicolás, Martín	Evicted (Day 147)						Nicolás, Bautista	Evicted (Day 147)				32
Constanza	Not in House																	Virginia, Nicolás	~~Federico~~, ~~Emmanuel~~	~~Martín~~, ~~Bautista~~	Evicted (Day 140)							Virginia, Bautista	Evicted (Day 140)				9
Paloma	Not in House												Exempt	Darío, Damián	Damián, Virginia	Mauro, Emmanuel	Emmanuel, ~~Juliana~~	Damián, Juliana	~~Martín~~, ~~Nicolás~~	Evicted (Day 133)								Bautista, Nicolás	Evicted (Day 133)				3
Damián	Not in House												Exempt	Mauro, Darío	Florencia R., Mauro	Emmanuel, Florencia R.	Emmanuel, ~~Juliana~~	Martín, Bautista	Evicted (Day 126)									Nicolás, Darío	Evicted (Day 126)				35
Catalina	Hernán, Nicolás	Isabel, ~~Sabrina~~	Lisandro, Sabrina	Martín, Lisandro	Emmanuel, Florencia C.	Evicted (Day 35)						Agostina, ~~Lisandro~~	Bautista, Sabrina	Florencia R., Bautista	**Paloma**	Emmanuel, Darío	~~Federico~~, ~~Zoe~~	Re-Evicted (Day 120)										Darío, Bautista	Re-Evicted (Day 120)				41
Joel	Juliana, Hernán	Catalina, Juliana	Carla, Lisandro	Lisandro, Sabrina	Agostina, Catalina	Nicolás, Denisse	Emmanuel, Virginia	Bautista, Sabrina	Bautista, Nicolás	Evicted (Day 64)		Bautista, Lisandro	Bautista, Martín	Emmanuel, Bautista	Darío, Florencia R.	Juliana, Darío	Re-Evicted (Day 113)											Nicolás, Darío	Re-Evicted (Day 113)				39
Rosina	Juliana, Axel	Axel, Carla	Florencia C., Lisandro	Florencia C., Carla	Sabrina, Emmanuel	Florencia C., Emmanuel	Zoe, Lucía	Agostina, Emmanuel	Agostina, Emmanuel	Emmanuel, Virginia	No nominations	Agostina, Martín	Isabel, Martín	Darío, Mauro	Damián (1)	Evicted (Day 105)												Darío, Virginia	Evicted (Day 105)				7
Denisse	Juliana, Lisandro	Carla, Juliana	Carla, Florencia C.	Carla, Juliana	Emmanuel, Carla	Juliana, Emmanuel	Bautista, Martín	Evicted (Day 50)					Sabrina, Federico	Federico, Damián	Re-Evicted (Day 98)													Emmanuel, Virginia	Re-Evicted (Day 98)				8
Sabrina	Juliana, Catalina	~~Juliana~~, Florencia C.	Florencia C., Carla	Catalina, Juliana	Joel, Emmanuel	Joel, Agostina	Alan, Emmanuel	Agostina, Juliana	Evicted (Day 56)				Catalina, Isabel	Re-Evicted (Day 91)														Darío, Nicolás	Re-Evicted (Day 91)				27
Isabel	Zoe, Juliana	Florencia C., ~~Juliana~~	Florencia C., Catalina	Catalina, Florencia C.	Evicted (Day 28)							Banned	Sabrina, Joel	Ejected (Day 88)														Darío, Virginia	Ejected (Day 88)				29
Agostina	Lucía, Isabel	Axel, ~~Sabrina~~	Florencia C., Sabrina	Martín, Sabrina	Emmanuel, Florencia C.	Florencia C., Emmanuel	Joel, Lucía	Federico, Lisandro	Rosina, Virginia	Federico, Martín	No nominations	Bautista, Martín	Walked (Day 85)															Emmanuel, Darío	Walked (Day 85)				37
Lisandro	Juliana, Zoe	Juliana, Florencia C.	Florencia C., Catalina	Catalina, Florencia C.	Carla, Emmanuel	Rosina, Florencia C.	Virginia, Nicolás	Joel, Emmanuel	Joel, Virginia	Juliana, Emmanuel	No nominations	Joel, Catalina	Evicted (Day 84)															Virginia, Darío	Evicted (Day 84)				32
Lucía	Denisse, Florencia C.	Isabel, Axel	Isabel, Florencia C.	Isabel, Florencia C.	Florencia C., Carla	Florencia C., Martín	Zoe, Rosina	Juliana, Federico	Lisandro, Agostina	Virginia, Martín	Evicted (Day 70)																	Darío, Virginia	Evicted (Day 70)				2
Alan	Zoe, Juliana	Carla, Catalina	Carla, Joel	Juliana, Rosina	Agostina, Catalina	Juliana, Joel	Sabrina, Federico	Evicted (Day 50)																				Virginia, Darío	Evicted (Day 50)				0
Florencia C.	Emmanuel, Williams	~~Sabrina~~, Axel	Sabrina, Isabel	Martín, Isabel	Carla, Agostina	Nicolás, Martín	Evicted (Day 42)																					Virginia, Darío	Evicted (Day 42)				55
Carla	Hernán, Axel	Isabel, ~~Sabrina~~	Sabrina, Denisse	Isabel, Martín	Banned	Walked (Day 37)																						Darío, ~~Martín~~	Walked (Day 37)				50
Williams	Isabel, Juliana	~~Juliana~~, Carla	Banned	Evicted (Day 22)																								Darío, Bautista	Evicted (Day 22)				8
Axel	Carla, Juliana	Catalina, Juliana	Evicted (Day 15)																									Emmanuel, Darío	Evicted (Day 15)				11
Hernán	Catalina, Juliana	Evicted (Day 7)																										Darío, Emmanuel	Evicted (Day 7)				7
Temporary HouseGuests
Nicolás S.	Not in House																												Nicolás, Martín	Left (Day 186)			N/A
Emma	Not in House																												Emmanuel, Martín	Evicted (Day 186)			N/A
María	Not in House																												Martín, Bautista	Evicted (Day 185)			N/A
Antonella	Not in House																												Emmannuel, Martín	Evicted (Day 185)			N/A
Sofía	Not in House																												Evicted (Day 184)				N/A
Georgina	Not in House																												Walked (Day 184)				N/A
Delfina	Not in House																						Aixa, Mateo	No; Nominations	No; Nominations	No; Nominations	Nicolás, Bautista	Visitor Winner (Day 171)					3
Facundo	Not in House																						Francisco, Sol	No; Nominations	No; Nominations	No; Nominations	Evicted (Day 170)						0
Franco	Not in House																						Delfina, Francisco	No; Nominations	No; Nominations	Evicted (Day 168)							1
Francisco	Not in House																						Noelia, Mateo	No; Nominations	No; Nominations	Evicted (Day 168)							9
Noelia	Not in House																						Sol, Rocío	No; Nominations	No; Nominations	Evicted (Day 165)							22
Mateo	Not in House																						Noelia, Francisco	No; Nominations	Evicted (Day 164)								5
Sol	Not in House																						Noelia, Rocío	No; Nominations	Evicted (Day 164)								10
Aixa	Not in House																						Noelia, Delfina	Evicted (Day 161)									2
Rocío	Not in House																						Noelia, Mateo	Evicted (Day 158)									4
Ariel	Not in House															Federico, Bautista	Left (Day 113)																N/A
Walter	Not in House															~~**Catalina**~~	Walked (Day 108)																N/A
Romina	Not in House								Virginia, Federico	Left (Day 63)																							N/A
Romina	Not in House								Rosina, Agostina	Left (Day 63)																							N/A
Notes	none	1, 2, 3	4, 5	5, 6	7, 8, 9, 10, 11, 12	13, 14	15, 16	17	18, 19	20	21	22, 23, 24, 25	26, 27, 28, 29	29, 30, 31, 32	33, 34, 35, 36, 37, 38	38, 39, 40	41, 42, 43, 44, 45	46, 47, 48, 49	46, 49, 50, 51, 52	53, 54, 55	56, 57	58	46, 59, 60, 61, 62, 63	64	65, 66	68	58, 67, 69	58, 70, 71	58, 72, 73	74	75, 76	77	
Walked	none					**Carla**	none						**Agostina**	none																			
Ejected	none												**Isabel**	none																			
Nominated	Catalina, Hernán, Juliana, Zoe	Axel, Carla, Catalina, Juliana	Carla, Florencia C., Juliana, Lisandro, Sabrina, Williams	Carla, Florencia C., Isabel, Lisandro, Nicolás	Agostina, Alan, Carla, Catalina, Emmanuel, Lisandro, Zoe	Agostina, Emmanuel, Florencia C., Lucía, Martín	~~Agostina~~, Alan, Bautista, Denisse, Emmanuel, Federico, ~~Joel~~, Juliana, Lisandro, ~~Lucía~~, Martín, ~~Nicolás~~, Rosina, Sabrina, Virginia, Zoe	Agostina, Emmanuel, Federico, Joel, Juliana, Lisandro, Nicolás, Sabrina	Agostina, Bautista, Emmanuel, Joel, Martin, Nicolás, Virginia	Emmanuel, Federico, Juliana, Lisandro, Lucia, Martin, Rosina, Virginia, Zoe	none	Agostina, Bautista, Isabel, Joel, Juliana, Lisandro	Bautista, ~~Isabel~~, Joel, Martín, Nicolás, Sabrina	Bautista, Damián, Darío, Denisse, Florencia R.	Catalina, Damián, Darío, Emmanuel, Florencia R., ~~Joel~~, Martín, Mauro, Nicolás, Paloma, Rosina	Damián, Emmanuel, Florencia R., Joel, Mauro	Catalina, Emmanuel, Federico, Florencia R., Juliana, Virginia	Constanza, Damián, Emmanuel, Juliana, Martín, Mauro, Paloma	Constanza, Darío, Emmanuel, Federico, Florencia R., Juliana, Martín, Mauro, Nicolás, Paloma, Virginia, Zoe	Bautista, Constanza, Emmanuel, Juliana, Martín	Darío, Federico, Florencia R., Martín, Mauro, Nicolás	Darío, Emmanuel, Florencia R., Juliana, Martín, Mauro	Francisco, Mateo, Noelia, Sol	none			Bautista, Darío, Emmanuel, Juliana, Martín, Nicolás	Darío, Emmanuel, Juliana, Nicolás, Virginia	Emmanuel, Juliana, Martín, Nicolás	Darío, Martín, Nicolás	none		
Saved (by HoH)	Catalina	~~Axel~~	none	Lisandro	Carla	Martín	Juliana	Juliana	Agostina	Virginia	none	Bautista	Martín	Florencia R.	Nicolás	~~Florencia R.~~	Emmanuel	Martín	none	Bautista	none	Florencia R.	Mateo	none			Martín	Darío	Nicolás	Darío	none		
Nominated (by HoH)	Williams	Agostina	Catalina	Rosina	Sabrina	Joel	Nicolás	Virginia	Lisandro	Nicolás	none	Virginia	Catalina	Nicolás, Mauro	Virginia	~~Darío~~	Paloma, Zoe	Darío	none	Zoe	none	Virginia	Aixa, Delfina	none			Florencia R.	Bautista	Bautista	Bautista	none		
Against public vote	Hernán, Juliana, Williams, Zoe	Agostina, Axel, Carla, Catalina, Juliana	Carla, Catalina, Florencia C., Juliana, Lisandro, Sabrina, Williams	Carla, Florencia C., Isabel, Nicolás, Rosina	Agostina, Alan, Catalina, Emmanuel, Lisandro, Sabrina, Zoe	Agostina, Emmanuel, Florencia C., Joel, Lucía	Alan, Bautista, Denisse, Emmanuel, Federico, Lisandro, Martín, Nicolás, Rosina, Sabrina, Virginia, Zoe	Agostina, Emmanuel, Federico, Joel, Lisandro, Nicolás, Sabrina, Virginia	Bautista, Emmanuel, Joel, Lisandro, Martín, Nicolás, Virginia	Emmanuel, Federico, Juliana, Lisandro, Lucia, Martín, Nicolás, Rosina, Zoe	Alan, Axel, Catalina, Denisse, Florencia C., Hernán, Isabel, Joel, Lucía, Sabrina, Williams	Agostina, Isabel, Joel, Juliana, Lisandro, Virginia	Bautista, Catalina, Joel, Nicolás, Sabrina	Bautista, Damián, Darío, Denisse, Mauro, Nicolás	Catalina, Damián, Darío, Emmanuel, Florencia R., Martín, Mauro, Paloma, Rosina, Virginia	Damián, Emmanuel, Florencia R., Joel, Mauro	Catalina, Federico, Florencia R., Juliana, Paloma, Virginia, Zoe	Constanza, Damián, Darío, Emmanuel, Juliana, Mauro, Paloma	Constanza, Darío, Emmanuel, Federico, Florencia R., Juliana, Martín, Mauro, Nicolás, Paloma, Virginia, Zoe	Constanza, Emmanuel, Juliana, Martín, Zoe	Darío, Federico, Florencia R., Martín, Mauro, Nicolás	Darío, Emmanuel, Juliana, Martín, Mauro, Virginia	Aixa, Delfina, Francisco, Noelia, Sol	Delfina, Facundo, Francisco, Franco, Mateo, Noelia, Sol	Delfina, Facundo, Francisco, Franco, ~~Noelia~~	Delfina, Facundo	Bautista, Darío, Emmanuel, Florencia R., Juliana, Nicolás	Bautista, Emmanuel, Juliana, Nicolás, Virginia	Bautista, Emmanuel, Juliana, Martín	Bautista, Martín, Nicolás	Bautista, Darío, Emmanuel	Bautista, Emmanuel, Nicolás	
Evicted	**Hernán**; 52.60% to evict (out of 2)	**Axel**; 54.30% to evict (out of 2)	**Williams**; 41.30% to evict (out of 3)	**Isabel**; 56.60% to evict (out of 2)	**Catalina**; 63.90% to evict (out of 2)	**Florencia C.** 56.80% to evict (out of 2)	**Denisse**; 10.20% to save (out of 3)	**Sabrina**; 40.50% to evict (out of 3)	**Joel**; 55.50% to evict (out of 2)	**Lucía**; 47.70% to evict (out of 3)	**Catalina**; 18.70% to re-enter (out of 9)	**Lisandro**; 61.60% to evict (out of 2)	**Sabrina**; 60.50% to evict (out of 2)	**Denisse**; 57.10% to evict (out of 2)	**Rosina**; 59.20% to evict (out of 2)	**Joel**; 53.80% to evict (out of 2)	**Catalina**; 57.10% to evict (out of 2)	**Damián**; 8.90% to save (out of 3)	**Paloma**; 0.30% to save	**Constanza**; 58.80% to evict (out of 2)	**Federico**; 54.20% to evict (out of 2)	**Mauro**; 57.80% to evict (out of 2)	**Rocío**; Evicted by envelope	**Mateo**; 1.42% to save	**Noelia**; Bautista's choice to evict (out of 5)	**Delfina**; 53.30% to win	**Florencia R.** 41.30% to evict (out of 3)	**Virginia**; 58.30% to evict (out of 2)	**Juliana**; 62.40% to evict	**Martín**; 59.30% to evict (out of 2)	**Darío**; 77.30% to evict (out of 2)	**Nicolás**; 2% to win (out of 3)	
Evicted	**Hernán**; 52.60% to evict (out of 2)	**Axel**; 54.30% to evict (out of 2)	**Williams**; 41.30% to evict (out of 3)	**Isabel**; 56.60% to evict (out of 2)	**Catalina**; 63.90% to evict (out of 2)	**Florencia C.** 56.80% to evict (out of 2)	**Alan**; 37.10% to save (out of 3)	**Sabrina**; 40.50% to evict (out of 3)	**Joel**; 55.50% to evict (out of 2)	**Lucía**; 47.70% to evict (out of 3)	**Joel**; 26.70% to re-enter (out of 6)	**Lisandro**; 61.60% to evict (out of 2)	**Sabrina**; 60.50% to evict (out of 2)	**Denisse**; 57.10% to evict (out of 2)	**Rosina**; 59.20% to evict (out of 2)	**Joel**; 53.80% to evict (out of 2)	**Catalina**; 57.10% to evict (out of 2)	**Damián**; 8.90% to save (out of 3)	**Paloma**; 0.30% to save	**Constanza**; 58.80% to evict (out of 2)	**Federico**; 54.20% to evict (out of 2)	**Mauro**; 57.80% to evict (out of 2)	**Aixa & Zoe**; 37.30% to save (out of 2)	**Sol**; 3.13% to save	**Francisco**; 12.20% to save (out of 4)	**Delfina**; 53.30% to win	**Florencia R.** 41.30% to evict (out of 3)	**Virginia**; 58.30% to evict (out of 2)	**Juliana**; 62.40% to evict	**Martín**; 59.30% to evict (out of 2)	**Darío**; 77.30% to evict (out of 2)	**Emmanuel**; 43.80% to win (out of 2)	
Evicted	**Hernán**; 52.60% to evict (out of 2)	**Axel**; 54.30% to evict (out of 2)	**Williams**; 41.30% to evict (out of 3)	**Isabel**; 56.60% to evict (out of 2)	**Catalina**; 63.90% to evict (out of 2)	**Florencia C.** 56.80% to evict (out of 2)	**Alan**; 37.10% to save (out of 3)	**Sabrina**; 40.50% to evict (out of 3)	**Joel**; 55.50% to evict (out of 2)	**Lucía**; 47.70% to evict (out of 3)	**Isabel**; 49.70% to re-enter (out of 3)	**Lisandro**; 61.60% to evict (out of 2)	**Sabrina**; 60.50% to evict (out of 2)	**Denisse**; 57.10% to evict (out of 2)	**Rosina**; 59.20% to evict (out of 2)	**Joel**; 53.80% to evict (out of 2)	**Catalina**; 57.10% to evict (out of 2)	**Damián**; 8.90% to save (out of 3)	**Paloma**; 0.30% to save	**Constanza**; 58.80% to evict (out of 2)	**Federico**; 54.20% to evict (out of 2)	**Mauro**; 57.80% to evict (out of 2)	**Aixa & Zoe**; 37.30% to save (out of 2)	**Sol**; 3.13% to save	**Franco**; 18.40% to save (out of 4)	**Delfina**; 53.30% to win	**Florencia R.** 41.30% to evict (out of 3)	**Virginia**; 58.30% to evict (out of 2)	**Juliana**; 62.40% to evict	**Martín**; 59.30% to evict (out of 2)	**Darío**; 77.30% to evict (out of 2)	**Emmanuel**; 43.80% to win (out of 2)	
Saved	**Juliana**; 47.40% (out of 2); **Williams**; 6.76% (out of 3); **Zoe**; 10.60% (out of 4)	**Juliana**; 45.70% (out of 2); **Catalina**; 32.50% (out of 3); **Carla**; 20.90% (out of 4); **Agostina**; 2.90% (out of 5)	**Juliana**; 37.30% (out of 3); **Lisandro**; 21.40% (out of 3); **Sabrina**; 8.30% (out of 4); **Catalina**; 5.80% (out of 5); **Florencia C.** 5.21% (out of 6); **Carla**; 2.60% (out of 7)	**Carla**; 43.40% (out of 2); **Nicolás**; 27% (out of 3); **Florencia C.** 4% (out of 4); **Rosina**; 5.20% (out of 5)	**Alan**; 36.10% (out of 2); **Emmanuel**; 22.10% (out of 3); **Agostina**; 12.70% (out of 4); **Sabrina**; 6.30% (out of 5); **Lisandro**; 3.20% (out of 6); **Zoe**; 1.40% (out of 7)	**Agostina**; 43.20% (out of 2); **Emmanuel**; 16.70% (out of 3); **Lucía**; 5.80% (out of 4); **Joel**; 1.90% (out of 5)	**Sabrina**; 52.70% (out of 3); **Bautista**; 38.60% (out of 4); **Nicolás**; 66.20% (out of 5); **Martín**; 48.10% (out of 6); **Virginia**; 33.10% (out of 7); **Emmanuel**; 25.80% (out of 8); **Federico**; 20.90% (out of 9); **Lisandro**; 17.50% (out of 10); **Zoe**; 15.40% (out of 11); **Rosina**; 14.30% (out of 12)	**Federico**; 34.30% (out of 3); **Agostina**; 25.20% (out of 3); **Nicolás**; 7.26% (out of 4); **Lisandro**; 7.41% (out of 5); **Emmanuel**; 4.47% (out of 6); **Virginia**; 2.70% (out of 7); **Joel**; 0.60% (out of 8)	**Virginia**; 44.50% (out of 2); **Martín**; 22.50% (out of 3); **Emmanuel**; 13.30% (out of 4); **Nicolás**; 15.50% (out of 5); **Bautista**; 11.90% (out of 6); **Lisandro**; 8.50% (out of 7)	**Juliana**; 32.80% (out of 3); **Lisandro**; 19.50% (out of 3); **Federico**; 6.80% (out of 4); **Emmanuel**; 2.10% (out of 5); **Zoe**; 1.30% (out of 6); **Rosina**; 0.99% (out of 7); **Martín**; 0.59% (out of 8); **Nicolás**; 0.20% (out of 9)	**Sabrina**; 26.60% (out of 3); **Denisse**; 23.70% (out of 3); **Lucía**; 18.80% (out of 4); **Alan**; 15% (out of 5); **Axel**; 9.78% (out of 7); **Florencia C.** 8.68% (out of 8); **Hernán**; 3.30% (out of 10); **Williams**; 0.30% (out of 11)	**Juliana**; 38.40% (out of 2); **Agostina**; 4.50% (out of 3); **Isabel**; Fewest votes (out of 4); **Virginia**; 0.60% (out of 5); **Joel**; 0.20% (out of 6)	**Catalina**; 39.50% (out of 2); **Joel**; 3% (out of 3); **Bautista**; 1.40% (out of 4); **Nicolás**; 0.20% (out of 5)	**Damián**; 42.90% (out of 2); **Mauro**; 16.10% (out of 3); **Nicolás**; 3.60% (out of 4); **Bautista**; 1.70% (out of 5); **Darío**; 0.70% (out of 6)	**Catalina**; 40.80% (out of 2); **Florencia R.** 21.10% (out of 3); **Damián**; 6.30% (out of 4); **Mauro**; 5.50% (out of 5); **Emmanuel**; 4.71% (out of 6); **Paloma**; 3.41% (out of 7); **Darío**; 1.53% (out of 8); **Martín**; 1.01% (out of 9); **Virginia**; 0.70% (out of 10)	**Emmanuel**; 46.20% (out of 2); **Mauro**; 19.50% (out of 3); **Florencia R.** 7.80% (out of 4); **Damián**; 2.50% (out of 5)	**Juliana**; 42.90% (out of 2); **Federico**; 13.10% (out of 3); **Zoe**; 7% (out of 4); **Florencia R.** 1.80% (out of 5); **Paloma**; 1.10% (out of 6); **Virginia**; 0.80% (out of 7)	**Paloma**; 42.70% (out of 3); **Darío**; 48.40% (out of 3); **Mauro**; 23.70% (out of 5); **Emmanuel**; 45.40% (out of 5); **Constanza**; 29.40% (out of 7); **Juliana**; 34.20% (out of 7)	**Darío**; 0.50% **Mauro**; 0.70% **Florencia R.** 1.50% **Federico**; 2.50% **Zoe**; 2.90% **Nicolás**; 5.80% **Emmanuel**; 6.90% **Virginia**; 7.60% **Martín**; 15.40% **Constanza**; 25.40% **Juliana**; 30.50%	**Emmanuel**; 41.20% (out of 2); **Juliana**; 20.80% (out of 3); **Martín**; 4.40% (out of 4); **Zoe**; 1% (out of 5)	**Martín**; 45.80% (out of 2); **Nicolás**; 25.40% (out of 3); **Florencia R.** 13.40% (out of 4); **Mauro**; 4.70% (out of 5); **Darío**; 3.40% (out of 6)	**Juliana**; 42.20% (out of 2); **Emmanuel**; 4.20% (out of 3); **Martín**; 0.60% (out of 4); **Darío**; 0.40% (out of 5); **Virginia**; 0.15% (out of 6)	**Sol**; 62.70% (out of 2); **Francisco**; 45.80% (out of 3); **Delfina**; 43.30% (out of 4); **Noelia**; 36.30% (out of 5)	**Delfina**; **Facundo**; **Francisco**; **Franco**; **Noelia**; Most votes	**Delfina**; **Facundo**; Most votes (out of 4)	**Facundo**; 46.70% to win	**Juliana**; 39.20% (out of 3); **Nicolás**; 19.50% (out of 3); **Emmanuel**; 6.30% (out of 4); **Bautista**; 1.10% (out of 5); **Darío**; 0.50% (out of 6)	**Juliana**; 41.70% (out of 2); **Nicolás**; 3.40% (out of 3); **Emmanuel**; 1.50% (out of 4); **Bautista**; 0.20% (out of 5)	**Martín**; 36.70% **Emmanuel**; 0.80% **Bautista**; 0.10%	**Nicolás**; 40.70% (out of 2); **Bautista**; 2.80% (out of 3)	**Bautista**; 22.70% (out of 2); **Emmanuel**; 13.70% (out of 3)	**Bautista**; 56.20% to win (out of 2)	

=== Notes ===
- **^1**: As punishment for discussing nominations, Agostina, Carla, Catalina, Florencia C. and Juliana's votes against Sabrina were nulled.
- **^2**: As punishment for discussing nominations, Bautista, Isabel, Sabrina and Williams' votes against Juliana were nulled.
- **^3**: As punishment for discussing the salvation earlier, Martín's choice of saving Axel from eviction was nulled.
- **^4**: As punishment for a confrontation that included violent attitudes, Juliana and Williams were automatically nominated and could not nominate or be saved by the Head of Household.
- **^5**: As punishment for arguing about the salvation and asking for opinions on it, Martín's power of salvation and the weekly reward for being the Head of Household were revoked. Additionally, he was unable to participate in the next HoH competition.
- **^6**: As punishment for speaking without a microphone, Nicolás was automatically nominated and could not nominate or be saved by the Head of Household.
- **^7**: Zoe answered the Red Phone and was automatically nominated for eviction. As a result, she was ineligible to become Head of Household and couldn't be saved by the Head of Household.
- **^8**: Juliana answered the Red Phone and won immunity from eviction.
- **^9**: As punishment for announcing her intention to use the Special Nomination Power, Juliana's votes were voided and was banned from nominating again this week. As a result, the Special Nomination Power was enabled again for all HouseGuests.
- **^10**: As punishment for announcing her intention to use the Special Nomination Power, Carla's votes were voided and was banned from nominating again this week. In addition, the Special Nomination Power was suspended until further notice.
- **^11**: Rosina answered the Red Phone and was given the power to nominate one HouseGuest for eviction, without the possibility of being saved by the Head of Household. She chose Lisandro.
- **^12**: As punishment for speaking without a microphone, Alan was automatically nominated for eviction.
- **^13**: Agostina answered the Red Phone and was ineligible to become Head of Household. She also had to choose one other HouseGuest to receive the same punishment. She chose Nicolás.
- **^14**: Lucía answered the Red Phone and was automatically nominated for eviction without the possibility of being saved by the Head of Household.
- **^15**: Joel answered the Red Phone and it was announced that all HouseGuests were automatically nominated for eviction this week. Only the Head of Household and three other HouseGuests would be saved from eviction. In addition, the viewers were voting to save rather than to evict. This week was also a double eviction.
- **^16**: The HouseGuests were required to nominate positive. The three HouseGuests with the most positive votes were safe along with the Head of Household. In addition, Florencia's final vote was also positive.
- **^17**: Both Alan and Denisse gave their final votes to Nicolás.
- **^18**: Special Guest Romina was required to nominate both positive and negative.
- **^19**: Martín answered the Red Phone and was given the power to nominate three HouseGuests for eviction without the possibility of being saved by the Head of Household. He chose Bautista, Emmanuel, and Nicolás.
- **^20**: As punishment for communicating with the outside world, Lucía, Rosina, and Zoe were automatically nominated for eviction without the possibility of being saved by the Head of Household. As a result of this, they were also banned from competing in the HoH competition.
- **^21**: Following Lucía eviction, the public had to vote for three ex-HouseGuests to re-enter the house. As Carla walked from the game, she was not included in the vote.
- **^22**: As punishment for receiving information from the outside world, Zoe was banned from competing in the HoH competition. In addition, she was ineligible to be saved by the Head of Household if nominated for eviction.
- **^23**: As punishment for refusing to wear her microphone and refusing to go to the Diary Room, Juliana was automatically nominated for eviction without the possibility of being saved by the Head of Household. As a result of this, she was also banned from competing in the HoH competition and was unable to nominate.
- **^24**: As punishment for sharing information from the outside world, Isabel was automatically nominated and could not nominate or be saved by the Head of Household.
- **^25**: As punishment for discussing nominations, Catalina and Zoe's votes against Lisandro were nulled.
- **^26**: Despite not having re-entered through the public vote, Gran Hermano allowed the re-entry of Denisse and Sabrina through two special Golden Tickets as they finished 4th and 5th in the re-entry vote respectively back in Week 11.
- **^27**: As new HouseGuests, Damián, Darío, Florencia R., Mauro and Paloma were exempt for the week and therefore couldn't nominate or be nominated. In addition, they were ineligible to become Head of Household.
- **^28**: As Isabel continued to share information from the outside world, and therefore breaking the rules regarding the isolation of the game, she was ejected by Gran Hermano on Day 88.
- **^29**: Joel answered the Red Phone and was immune from the next eviction. In addition, he was given the power to nominate two HouseGuests for eviction. He chose Martín and Nicolás.
- **^30**: Starting in Week 14, the Special Nomination power was re-enabled by Gran Hermano.
- **^31**: As Denisse was automatically nominated for eviction via the Power Nomination, Sabrina's final vote against Denisse was nulled.
- **^32**: As Heads of Household, both Martín and Zoe each had to put one HouseGuest up for eviction. Martín chose Nicolás, while Zoe chose Mauro.
- **^33**: Lisandro made a brief return to the house to give three HouseGuests a chance to pick one of the three gold envelopes. He chose Emmanuel, Martín, and Rosina.
  - You are nominated: Martín
  - This week your votes are doubled: Emmanuel
  - This week you will only have one vote: Rosina
- **^34**: As punishment for talking when Lisandro returned to the house, Catalina and Rosina were automatically nominated for eviction. As a result, Denisse's final vote against Catalina was nulled.
- **^35**: As Bautista became immune by winning the Head of Household competition, Juliana's Special Nomination vote against him was nulled.
- **^36**: As punishment for speaking without their microphones, Joel and Nicolás were automatically nominated for eviction.
- **^37**: As punishment for speaking without his microphone, Emmanuel was automatically nominated for eviction.
- **^38**: Agostina made a brief return to the house to drop off three purple envelopes. The HouseGuests had to decide among themselves who would choose one of the three envelopes. They chose Catalina, Damián, and Joel.
  - Next week, you are nominated: Damián
  - You have won a dinner with the HouseGuest of your choosing: Catalina
  - If you are nominated, you are safe. If not, you must save one of the nominees: Joel
- **^39**: Both Special Guests Walter and Ariel were required to nominate. Ariel nominated as normal, while Walter was given a Power Nomination. Walter used his Power Nomination on Catalina. However, as he decided to leave the house before the Nomination Gala, his Power Nomination against Catalina was nulled.
- **^40**: As punishment for discussing the salvation, Paloma's choice of saving Florencia R. from eviction was nulled. In addition, her choice of nominating Darío for eviction was also nulled.
- **^41**: As Martín became immune by winning the Head of Household competition, Zoe's Special Nomination vote against him was nulled.
- **^42**: As punishment for discussing nominations, Bautista and Catalina's votes against Federico were nulled.
- **^43**: As punishment for discussing nominations, Damián, Federico, Florencia R., Paloma, Virginia, and Zoe's votes against Juliana were nulled.
- **^44**: As punishment for discussing nominations, Catalina and Martín's votes against Zoe were nulled.
- **^45**: As Heads of Household, both Bautista and Martín each had to put one HouseGuest up for eviction. Martín chose Paloma, while Bautista chose Zoe.
- **^46**: During this week, the viewers were voting to save rather than to evict.
- **^47**: Florencia R. used her Power Nomination on Emmanuel. As a result of this, he was dethroned as Head of Household. As Federico was the runner-up in the Head of Household competition, he became the new HoH.
- **^48**: As punishment for discussing nominations, Juliana, Virginia and Zoe's votes against Martín were nulled.
- **^49**: Emmanuel answered the Red Phone and won three prizes. First, a dinner with the HouseGuest of his choosing. Second, the power to double his votes at the next Nominations Gala. And third, the right to automatically nominate two HouseGuests for eviction. He chose Mauro and Paloma as his two nominees.
- **^50**: As Bautista became immune by winning the Head of Household competition, Damián's final vote against him was nulled.
- **^51**: As punishment for announcing his intention to use the Special Nomination Power, Emmanuel's votes were voided and the power was enabled for all HouseGuests.
- **^52**: Due to bad behavior and multiple rule breaks throughout the start of the week, Gran Hermano voided all the votes and put all HouseGuests up for eviction. As Bautista won the Head of Household competition, he was the only HouseGuest that was safe, however he lost his right to save one HouseGuest from eviction. Had this not happened, Constanza, Emmanuel, Federico and Martín would have faced the public vote.
- **^53**: In Week 20, both the Special Nomination and Power Nomination were disabled.
- **^54**: As punishment for discussing nominations in code, Constanza and Martín's nominations were voided.
- **^55**: As punishment for discussing nominations, Emmanuel, Federico, Florencia R. and Juliana's votes towards Constanza were nulled.
- **^56**: Nicolás answered the red phone and won the right to nominate one HouseGuest for eviction without the possibility of being saved by the Head of Household. He chose Darío.
- **^57**: As punishment for discussing the salvation, Bautista lost his right to save a nominee. In addition, he also lost his right to nominate a HouseGuest and was dethroned as the Head of Household. As Virginia was the runner-up in the Head of Household competition, she took over as HoH.
- **^58**: As punishment for a confrontation that included violent attitude towards Mauro, Juliana was permanently nominated until the end of her stay in the house. Furthermore, she will no longer be eligible to be saved by the Head of Household and will no longer be immune if she becomes HoH.
- **^59**: In Week 23, both the Special Nomination and Power Nomination were disabled.
- **^60**: This week, the HouseGuests and their friends and families will nominate together. Only the HouseGuests's friends and families are eligible to be nominated. The friend or family member with the fewest votes to save on eviction night, will be evicted along with the HouseGuest they represent. As Aixa received the fewest votes to save, Zoe was also evicted.
- **^61**: As Facundo won the Head of Household competition, Martín was safe from eviction.
- **^62**: Facundo was required to name two replacement nominees instead of one.
- **^63**: Catalina made a brief return to drop off a purple envelope. If one of the HouseGuests's friends and family reads the envelope, they would be evicted immediately. If a HouseGuest reads the envelope, then their friend or family member would be evicted immediately. As Juliana read the envelope, her friend Rocío was evicted.
- **^64**: Following Zoe & Aixa's eviction, the vote was open for the public to vote for their favorite visitor. The two visitors who receives the fewest votes will be evicted.
- **^65**: Following Sol & Mateo's eviction, the vote was open once again for the public to vote for their favorite visitor. The two visitors with the fewest votes will be evicted.
- **^66**: As Head of Household, Bautista had to evict one visitor from the house. He chose Noelia.
- **^67**: Florencia R. answered the red phone and won the power to double her votes at the next Nominations Gala.
- **^68**: Following Francisco & Franco's eviction, the vote was open for the final time for the public to vote for their favorite visitor. The visitor who receives the most votes wins.
- **^69**: As Delfina was voted by the public as their favorite visitor, Virginia automatically became the new Head of Household.
- **^70**: This week, the remaining HouseGuests will not nominate, instead all evicted HouseGuests including those who walked or got ejected will nominate.
- **^71**: As Martín became immune by winning the Head of Household competition, Carla and Mauro's votes towards him were nulled.
- **^72**: As Darío became immune by winning the Head of Household competition, Virginia's final vote against him was nulled.
- **^73**: This week, the HouseGuests and their family members will nominate together.
- **^74**: Last week, the HouseGuests had to evict one of their own relatives throughout last week. The last relative standing would win Head of Household for the HouseGuest they represent. As Nicolás S. was the last relative standing, he won HoH for Emmanuel.
- **^75**: Bautista answered the red phone and had to choose to either nominate or be nominated for eviction. He chose to nominate himself and therefore was banned from the final Head of Household competition.
- **^76**: By winning the Head of Household competition, Nicolás became the first finalist, leaving Darío and Emmanuel nominated for eviction along with Bautista.
- **^77**: For the final week, the public were voting for the winner of Gran Hermano.

== Production ==
=== Development ===
Gran Hermano is co-produced by production companies Kuarzo Entertainment Argentina and Banijay. The season was first confirmed on 26 March 2023. Host Santiago del Moro was also confirmed to return for the season. Casting for the season started on the same day of the announcement with open-call auditions held for people from up 18 years old. Applicants had to upload a presentation video and show their social networks.

=== Production design ===
The house is located in Martínez, Buenos Aires. As with previous seasons, the house is outfitted with 65 cameras and 87 microphones. With over 2,500 square metres, it would become the biggest house ever of Gran Hermano Argentina, including 1,200 m^{2} indoors, 400 m^{2} outdoors, a supermarket, and the "arena" in which the HouseGuests are expected to compete for games and challenges.

=== Prizes ===
The winner of the series, determined by the audience, will receive AR$ 50 million pesos (invested by Mercado Pago) and a house. The runner-up will receive AR$ 10 million pesos and the second runner-up AR$ 5 million pesos. All three finalists will also receive a year's worth of beer from Amstel, and a motorcycle from Motomel.

== Release ==
=== Broadcast ===
The premiere of the eleventh season of Gran Hermano was broadcast on Telefe on 11 December 2023. The telecast received a 20.50/63.3 rating/share.

The season airs from Sundays through Thursdays on Telefe, and a special edition called Night with the Exes (La Noche de los Ex in Spanish) with former HouseGuests from previous seasons on Fridays. The debates are joined by panelists Julieta Poggio, Sol Pérez, Gastón Trezeguet, Laura Ubfal, Ceferino Reato, Eliana Guercio, Marisa Brel, Costa and Pilar Smith.

Internationally, the season airs in simulcast in Chile on Chilevisión and in Uruguay on Canal 10.

=== Streaming services ===
DirecTV's video streaming service DGO was chosen to offer a 24-hour live feed of the house. Telefe airs in simulcast the season via YouTube and Twitch, hosted by Diego Poggi, Juan Ignacio Castañares, Lucila Villar and Daniela Celis, and the galas will become available to watch on the day after their premiere on Paramount's video streaming service Pluto TV.

This season's viewership results on social media saw a growth of 51% compared to the previous season. More than 26,3 million people watched this season of Gran Hermano on all digital platforms.

== Reception ==
=== Ratings ===
Throughout its broadcast, in same-day viewership, the season averaged a 17.16 household rating and a 64.94% of share. The most watched episode was the 16th eviction gala that aired on 8 April 2024 with a 22.3 HH rating, and the least watched was the first eviction gala that aired on 17 December 2023 with a 13.2 HH rating. The final gala averaged 19.5/78 HH rating/share.

No.	Title	Air date	Timeslot (ART)	HH rating
1	Premiere	11 December 2023	Monday 9:45 p.m.	20.5
2	1st Nomination Gala	13 December 2023	Wednesday 10:30 p.m.	16.4
3	1st Eviction Gala	17 December 2023	Sunday 10:00 p.m.	13.2
4	2nd Nomination Gala	20 December 2023	Wednesday 10:30 p.m.	13.6
5	2nd Eviction Gala	25 December 2023	Monday 10:30 p.m.	16.6
6	3rd Nomination Gala	27 December 2023	Wednesday 10:30 p.m.	16.5
7	3rd Eviction Gala	1 January 2024	Monday 10:30 p.m.	14.2
8	4th Nomination Gala	3 January 2024	Wednesday 10:30 p.m.	16.6
9	4th Eviction Gala	7 January 2024	Sunday 10:00 p.m.	16.9
10	5th Nomination Gala	10 January 2024	Wednesday 10:30 p.m.	15.6
11	5th Eviction Gala	14 January 2024	Sunday 10:00 p.m.	18.2
12	6th Nomination Gala	17 January 2024	Wednesday 10:30 p.m.	17.8
13	6th Eviction Gala	21 January 2024	Sunday 10:00 p.m.	18.1
14	7th Nomination Gala	24 January 2024	Wednesday 10:30 p.m.	16.1
15	7th Eviction Gala (Part 1)	28 January 2024	Sunday 10:00 p.m.	17.6
16	7th Eviction Gala (Part 2)	29 January 2024	Monday 10:30 p.m.	17.3
17	8th Nomination Gala	31 January 2024	Wednesday 10:30 p.m.	16.8
18	8th Eviction Gala	4 February 2024	Sunday 10:00 p.m.	17.2
19	9th Nomination Gala	7 February 2024	Wednesday 10:30 p.m.	17.5
20	9th Eviction Gala (Part 1)	11 February 2024	Sunday 10:00 p.m.	13.5
21	9th Eviction Gala (Part 2)	12 February 2024	Monday 10:30 p.m.	17.7
22	10th Nomination Gala	14 February 2024	Wednesday 10:30 p.m.	17.9
23	10th Eviction Gala	18 February 2024	Sunday 10:00 p.m.	19.2
24	Re-Entry Gala	25 February 2024	Sunday 10:00 p.m.	20.5
25	11th Nomination Gala	28 February 2024	Wednesday 10:30 p.m.	18.8
26	11th Eviction Gala	3 March 2024	Sunday 10:00 p.m.	21.0
27	2nd Re-Entry and New HouseGuests Entry Gala	4 March 2024	Monday 10:30 p.m.	21.8
28	12th Nomination Gala	6 March 2024	Wednesday 10:30 p.m.	16.9
29	12th Eviction Gala	10 March 2024	Sunday 10:00 p.m.	17.0
30	13th Nomination Gala	13 March 2024	Wednesday 10:30 p.m.	17.7
31	13th Eviction Gala	17 March 2024	Sunday 10:00 p.m.	18.4
32	14th Nomination Gala	20 March 2024	Wednesday 10:30 p.m.	18.7
33	14th Eviction Gala	24 March 2024	Sunday 10:00 p.m.	18.7
34	15th Nomination Gala	27 March 2024	Wednesday 10:30 p.m.	17.5
35	15th Eviction Gala	1 April 2024	Monday 10:30 p.m.	18.7
36	16th Nomination Gala	3 April 2024	Wednesday 10:30 p.m.	18.8
37	16th Eviction Gala (Part 1)	7 April 2024	Sunday 10:00 p.m.	18.5
38	16th Eviction Gala (Part 2)	8 April 2024	Monday 10:30 p.m.	22.3
39	17th Nomination Gala	10 April 2024	Wednesday 10:30 p.m.	16.1
40	17th Eviction Gala	14 April 2024	Sunday 10:00 p.m.	18.0
41	18th Nomination Gala	17 April 2024	Wednesday 10:30 p.m.	17.5
42	18th Eviction Gala	21 April 2024	Sunday 10:00 p.m.	17.4
43	19th Nomination Gala	23 April 2024	Tuesday 10:30 p.m.	17.1
44	19th Eviction Gala	28 April 2024	Sunday 10:00 p.m.	18.5
45	20th Nomination Gala	1 May 2024	Wednesday 10:30 p.m.	17.3
46	20th Eviction Gala	5 May 2024	Sunday 10:00 p.m.	20.1
47	21st Nomination Gala	8 May 2024	Wednesday 10:30 p.m.	16.7
48	21st Eviction Gala	12 May 2024	Sunday 10:00 p.m.	19.0
49	Visitors 1st Entry Gala	13 May 2024	Monday 10:30 p.m.	17.8
50	22nd Nomination Gala	15 May 2024	Wednesday 10:30 p.m.	15.3
51	22nd Eviction Gala	19 May 2024	Sunday 10:00 p.m.	18.4
52	Visitors' 1st Eviction Gala	22 May 2024	Wednesday 10:30 p.m.	15.9
53	Visitors' 2nd Eviction Gala	26 May 2024	Sunday 10:00 p.m.	16.7
54	23rd Nomination Gala	29 May 2024	Wednesday 10:30 p.m.	17.4
55	23rd Eviction Gala	2 June 2024	Sunday 10:00 p.m.	18.5
56	24th Nomination Gala	5 June 2024	Wednesday 10:30 p.m.	17.0
57	24th Eviction Gala	9 June 2024	Sunday 10:00 p.m.	20.3
58	Visitors 2nd Entry Gala	10 June 2024	Monday 10:30 p.m.	16.6
59	25th Nomination Gala	12 June 2024	Wednesday 10:30 p.m.	15.3
60	25th Eviction Gala (Part 1)	17 June 2024	Monday 10:00 p.m.	16.6
61	25th Eviction Gala (Part 2)	18 June 2024	Tuesday 10:30 p.m.	18.9
62	26th Nomination Gala	19 June 2024	Wednesday 10:30 p.m.	18.2
63	26th Eviction Gala	23 June 2024	Sunday 10:00 p.m.	16.1
64	27th Eviction Gala	30 June 2024	Sunday 10:00 p.m.	15.5
65	Final Gala	7 July 2024	Sunday 10:30 p.m.	19.5
