= Asia Rugby U19 Championship =

Annual rugby union championship

- Current season or competition: 2022 U-19 Asia Rugby Championship
- Sport: Rugby union
- Instituted: 2005
- Number of teams: 4 (2019)
- Country: Asia (Asia Rugby)
- Holders: Hong Kong (2019)

The Under-19 Asia Rugby Championship is an annual rugby union championship for Under-19 national teams, held since 2005. The championship is organised by rugby's Asian governing body, the Asia Rugby.

The tournament serves as Asia's qualification to the next year's World Rugby U20 Trophy organised by the World Rugby.

Hong Kong are the current champions, having won their 6th successive title in Kaohsiung, Taiwan in 2019.

== Results ==
=== U19 ===
https://www.asiarugby.com/category/asia-rugby-u19/

==== Men ====
Year	Host	Winner	Runner-up	Third place	Fourth place
2010	(Thailand) Bangkok	Japan	Hong Kong	Sri Lanka	Thailand
2011	Hong Kong	Japan	Hong Kong	Thailand	Sri Lanka
2012	Hong Kong	Japan	South Korea	Hong Kong	Thailand
2013	(Taiwan) Kaohsiung	Japan	Hong Kong	South Korea	Chinese Taipei
2014	(Sri Lanka) Colombo	Hong Kong	Sri Lanka	Chinese Taipei	South Korea
2015	Singapore	Hong Kong	Sri Lanka	Chinese Taipei	Singapore
2016	(Malaysia) Kuala Lumpur	Hong Kong	Chinese Taipei	Sri Lanka	Malaysia
2017	Hong Kong (Sri Lanka) Colombo	Hong Kong	Sri Lanka	N/A	N/A
2018	(Taiwan) Taipei	Hong Kong	South Korea	Chinese Taipei	Sri Lanka
2019	(Taiwan) Kaohsiung	Hong Kong	South Korea	Chinese Taipei	Singapore
2020	Cancelled due to the COVID-19 pandemic.				
2021	Cancelled due to the COVID-19 pandemic.				
2022	(Malaysia) Kuala Lumpur	Hong Kong	Chinese Taipei	Malaysia	N/A

=== U20 ===
19/08/2023 20/08/2023 AR U20s Men & Women Nepal

=== U18 ===
30/9/2023 1/10/2023 AR U18s Boys & Girls 7s Taiwan

== Medals (2010-2022) ==
=== Men ===
Rank	Nation	Gold	Silver	Bronze	Total
1	Hong Kong (HKG)	7	3	1	11
2	Japan (JPN)	4	0	0	4
3	Sri Lanka (SRI)	0	3	2	5
4	South Korea (KOR)	0	3	1	4
5	Chinese Taipei (TPE)	0	2	4	6
6	Malaysia (MAS)	0	0	1	1
6	Thailand (THA)	0	0	1	1
Totals (7 entries)		11	11	10	32
