= 2018 U-19 Asia Rugby Championship =

Rugby union competition in Taipei, Taiwan

Tournament details
- Host: Taiwan
- Date: 12–18 December 2018
- Countries: 4

Final positions
- Champions: Hong Kong
- Relegated: Sri Lanka

Tournament statistics
- Matches played: 6

The 2018 U-19 Asia Rugby Championship is an international rugby union competition for Under 20 national teams in Asia. The competition was held in Taipei, Taiwan. The winners in Asia Rugby U19 Championship secured a berth at the 2019 World Rugby Under 20 Trophy.

== Top division ==
The top division was held in Taipei, Taiwan from 12–18 December 2018 in a round-robin tournament format.

=== Table ===
Champions and qualification
for the 2019 World Rugby Under 20 Trophy.
Relegated

Position	Nation	Games				Points			Bonus		Point
Position	Nation	Played	Won	Drawn	Lost	For	Against	Difference	Tries	Losing	Point
1	Hong Kong	3	2	0	1	99	37	+62	2	1	11
2	South Korea	3	2	0	1	51	46	+5	1	1	10
3	Chinese Taipei	2	2	0	1	30	58	-28	0	0	8
4	Sri Lanka	3	0	0	3	56	95	-39	1	2	3
Source: Macoocoo

=== Matches ===
All times are local (UTC+8).

==== Round 1 ====
12 December 2018
17:00

Hong Kong	13–17	South Korea

Taipei Municipal Stadium, Taipei

12 December 2018
19:00

Chinese Taipei	18–15	Sri Lanka

Taipei Municipal Stadium, Taipei

==== Round 2 ====
15 December 2018
17:00

Hong Kong	48–15	Sri Lanka

Taipei Municipal Stadium, Taipei

15 December 2018
19:00

Chinese Taipei	7–5	South Korea

Taipei Municipal Stadium, Taipei

==== Round 3 ====
18 December 2018
13:00

Sri Lanka	26–29	South Korea

Taipei Municipal Stadium, Taipei

18 December 2018
15:00

Chinese Taipei	5–38	Hong Kong

Taipei Municipal Stadium, Taipei

== Division 1 ==
2018 U-19 Asia Rugby Championship division 1
Tournament details
- Host: Thailand
- Date: 11–14 December 2018
- Countries: 4

Final positions
- Champions: Singapore

Tournament statistics
- Matches played: 4

Division 1 was hosted by the Thailand at the Bang-Bon Stadium in Bangkok from 11–14 December 2018. The winner will be promoted to the top division.

Semi-finals
11 December 2018
Singapore	36
China	5
11 December 2018
Philippines	8
Thailand	16

Final
14 December 2018
Thailand	15
Singapore	19
Third place play-off
14 December 2018
Philippines	33
China	19

=== Matches ===
==== Semi-finals ====
11 December 2018
16:30 ICT (UTC+7)

Singapore	36–5	China
	Report

Bang-Bon Stadium, Bangkok

11 December 2018
18:15 ICT (UTC+7)

Thailand	16–8	Philippines
	Report

Bang-Bon Stadium, Bangkok

==== 3rd place playoff ====
14 December 2018
16:30 ICT (UTC+7)

Philippines	33–19	China
	Report

Bang-Bon Stadium, Bangkok

==== Final ====
14 December 2018
18:15 ICT (UTC+7)

Thailand	15–19	Singapore
	Report

Bang-Bon Stadium, Bangkok

== See also ==
- List of sporting events in Taiwan
