= 2015 South American Junior Rugby Championship "A" =

- Date: August 9 – August 15, 2015
- Countries: 4
- Champions: Uruguay (2nd title)

Tournament statistics
- Matches played: 6

The 2015 South American Junior Rugby Championship (Sudamérica Rugby (CONSUR) Championship) Division A was the second edition of the newly formatted South American Junior Rugby Championship for Under-19 national teams. It was held in Asunción, Paraguay, from August 9 to 15. The top 4 nations of South America play the tournament. The winner will play for the Junior CONSUR Cup against Argentina.

The tournament serves as CONSUR's qualifier for the 2016 World Rugby Under 20 Trophy to be held in Zimbabwe.

== Standings ==
Qualifies to U20 Rugby Trophy & Junior CONSUR Cup

Place	Nation	Games				Points			Table points
Place	Nation	played	won	drawn	lost	for	against	diff	Table points
1	Uruguay	3	3	0	0	119	29	+90	9
2	Chile	3	2	0	1	79	57	+22	6
3	Brazil	3	1	0	2	47	71	–24	3
4	Paraguay	3	0	0	3	18	106	–88	0

== Matches ==
=== First round ===
9 August 2015
15:00 PYT (UTC-02)

Brazil	3–32	Chile
Pen: Ceccarelli 12'	Report	Try: Huerta 50' c Ramírez 54' m Vera 61' m Díaz 71' m Raddatz 75' c Con: Huerta 51', 76'; Pen: Huerta 6'

Estadio Héroes de Curupayty, Asunción
Referee: Víctor Silvero (Paraguay)

9 August 2015
17:00 PYT (UTC-02)

Paraguay	0–44	Uruguay
	Report	Try: Diana 6' c Mascia (3) 26' m, 35' c, 43' m Arata 29' m Olaso 45' m Bruno (2) 54' m, 69' m Con: Etcheverry 7', 36'

Estadio Héroes de Curupayty, Asunción
Referee: Esteban Filipanics (Argentina)

=== Second round ===
12 August 2015
19:00 PYT (UTC-02)

Brazil	12–27	Uruguay
Try: Rosa 25' m Figuereido 69' c Con: Ceccarelli 70'	Report	Try: Mascia 3' c Olaso 15' m Chamyan 22' m Williamson 44' m Fitipaldo 58' m Con: Durán 4'

Estadio Héroes de Curupayty, Asunción
Referee: Esteban Filipanics (Argentina)

12 August 2015
21:00 PYT (UTC-02)

Paraguay	6–30	Chile
Pen: Cáceres 5', 22'	Report	Try: Raddatz (2) 7' m, 34' m Planella 20' c Gana 31' c Con: Huerta 21', 32'; Pen: Huerta 24'; Drop: Huerta 70'

Estadio Héroes de Curupayty, Asunción
Referee: Claudio Cattivelli (Uruguay)

=== Third round ===
15 August 2015
15:00 PYT (UTC-02)

Paraguay	12–32	Brazil
Try: Gorostiaga 24' c Aldama 72' m Con: Cáceres 25'	Report	Try: Santos 2' m Ceccarelli 11' m Figueiredo (2) 19' c, 61' c Rocha 75' m Con: Ceccarelli 20', 62'; Pen: Ceccarelli 22'

Estadio Héroes de Curupayty, Asunción
Referee: Claudio Cattivelli (Uruguay)

15 August 2015
17:00 PYT (UTC-02)

Chile	17–48	Uruguay
Try: Sigren 51' m Aviles 55' c Bohn 62' m Con: Huerta 56', 62'	Report	Try: Ormaechea 8' m Inciarte (2) 22' c, 46' c Etcheverry 48' c Diana 58' m Kigel 63' c Brignoni 68' c Con: Etcheverry 23', 47', 49'; Fitipaldo 64', 69'; Pen: Etcheverry 32'

Estadio Héroes de Curupayty, Asunción
Referee: Daniel Schneider (Argentina)

== Awards ==
Felipe Etcheverry from Uruguay was chosen as the best player of the tournament.

== Sudamérica Junior Rugby Cup ==
The second edition was played on 10 October in Rosario, between the past champions Argentina against the 2015 South American Junior Rugby Championship "A" champions Uruguay.

10 October 2015
11:30 ARGT (UTC-03)

Argentina	78–0	Uruguay
	Report

Club Universitario de Rosario, Rosario
Referee: Federico Fioravanti (Argentina)

== See also ==
- South American Junior Rugby Championship
