= Meri Deal =

Uruguayan singer (born 1996)

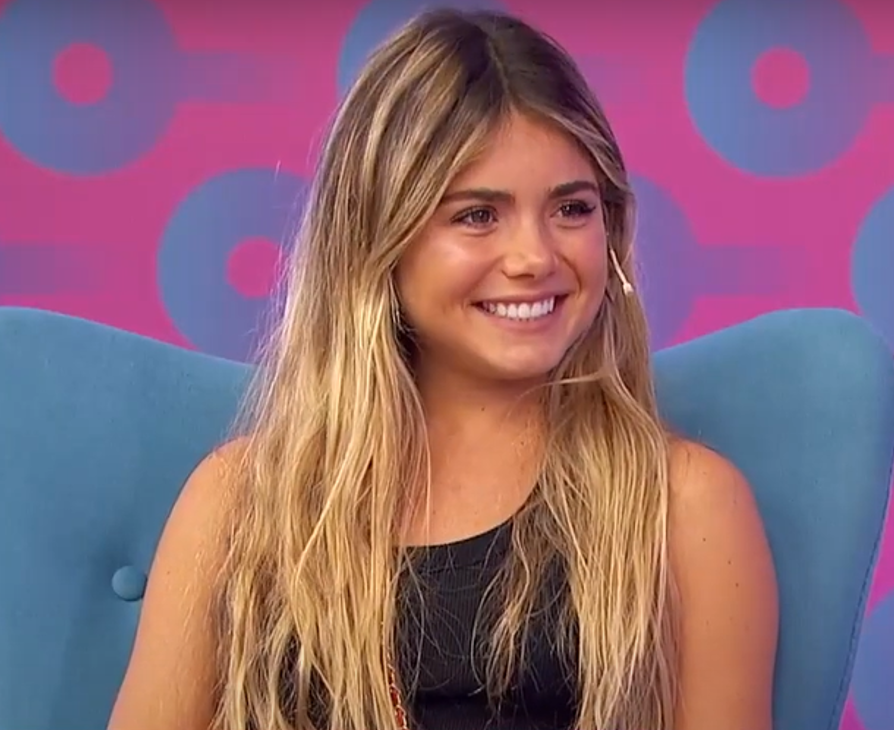
- Deal in 2021
- Born: María Inés Deal Herrán; 22 November 1996 (age 29); Montevideo, Uruguay
- Occupations: Singer; songwriter
- Years active: 2013–present
- Musical career
- Genres: Latin pop; cumbia; Latin R&B
- Instruments: Vocals
- Labels: Universal Music México

María Inés Deal Herrán (born 22 November 1996) known professionally as Meri Deal, is a Uruguayan singer and songwriter. She rose to prominence as a member of the cumbia pop group Toco Para Vos, which achieved international success in Latin America.

== Early life ==
María Inés Deal Herrán was born on 22 November 1996, the youngest child and only daughter of Juan Manuel Deal Irigoyen and Mariana Herrán. She has two brothers, Juan and Pedro. Raised in El Pinar, Canelones Department, she attended The British Schools of Montevideo. She began singing at an early age and in her teens performed in school plays and was part of dance groups.

== Career ==
=== 2013–2019: Career beginnings and Toco Para Vos ===
In 2013, 17-year-old Deal was recruited by her cousin Bautista Mascia to be the vocalist for Toco Para Vos, a new cumbia pop band formed by a group of friends from the rugby team and high school. In 2014 the group released their debut single "Hasta la Luna", and in 2015 their hit single "Solo necesito", which led them to breakthrough in several Latin American countries. Immediately after that, they signed with Warner Music.

In the southern summer of 2016 they made their first international tour through the seaside towns of Argentina. As of 2021, Deal had released thirty-three singles and a studio album with the group and performed in Argentina, Chile and Paraguay.

=== 2020–present: Solo career and Amores Prófugos ===
In February 2019, she announced her solo career and performed her own songs as the opening act for Ed Sheeran's concert in Montevideo on the ÷ Tour. In March 2020, she also opened for Backstreet Boys and Maroon 5. In January 2021, after a two-year hiatus, Toco Para Vos reunited and released “Se Picó,” alongside Uruguayan singers El Reja and Marka Akme.

In August 2021, she signed with Warner Music Mexico and released "11 con 11", her first solo single, which was nominated for the Graffiti Award for Best Pop Single.
