= 2020 World Rugby Under 20 Trophy =

Tournament details
- Host nation: Spain
- Dates: –
- No. of nations: 8

Tournament statistics
- Matches played: 16

The 2020 World Rugby U20 Trophy was scheduled to be the 13th annual international rugby union competition for Under 20 national teams, second-tier world championship.

The championship was cancelled due to the COVID-19 pandemic.

== Qualified teams ==
A total of eight teams were scheduled to play in the tournament. The hosts Spain and the 2019 World Rugby Under 20 Championship relegation country Scotland qualified automatically. The remaining six countries would qualify through a regional qualification process in regional competitions (North America, South America, Europe, Africa, Asia, Oceania).

Host (1)

- Spain

Relegated from 2019 JWC

- Scotland

Asia Rugby (1)

- Hong Kong

Rugby Africa (1)

Sudamérica Rugby (1)

- Uruguay

Rugby Americas North (1)

Rugby Europe (1)

Oceania Rugby (1)

- Samoa
