= 2019 U-19 Asia Rugby Championship =

Tournament details
- Host: Taiwan
- Date: 8–14 December 2019
- Countries: 4

Final positions
- Champions: Hong Kong
- Relegated: Singapore

Tournament statistics
- Matches played: 6

The 2019 U-19 Asia Rugby Championship is an international rugby union competition for Under 20 national teams in Asia. The winners in Asia Rugby U19 Championship secured a berth at the 2020 World Rugby Under 20 Trophy.

== Top division ==
The top division was held in Kaohsiung, Taiwan from 8–14 December 2019 in a round-robin tournament format.

=== Table ===
Champions and qualification
for the 2020 World Rugby Under 20 Trophy.
Relegated

Position	Nation	Games				Points			Bonus		Point
Position	Nation	Played	Won	Drawn	Lost	For	Against	Difference	Tries	Losing	Point
1	Hong Kong	3	2	0	1	91	67	+24	2	0	10
2	South Korea	3	2	0	1	73	64	+9	1	0	9
3	Chinese Taipei	3	2	0	1	49	44	+5	1	0	9
4	Singapore	3	0	0	3	55	93	-38	1	2	3
Source: Macoocoo

=== Matches ===
All times are local (UTC+8).

==== Round 1 ====
8 December 2019
17:00

Hong Kong	47–20	Singapore

National Stadium, Kaohsiung
Referee: Tasuku Kawahara (Japan)

8 December 2019
19:00

Chinese Taipei	7–22	South Korea

National Stadium, Kaohsiung
Referee: Toshimasa Sekiya (Japan)

==== Round 2 ====
11 December 2019
17:00

South Korea	32–28	Singapore

National Stadium, Kaohsiung

11 December 2019
19:00

Chinese Taipei	28–15	Hong Kong

National Stadium, Kaohsiung

==== Round 3 ====
14 December 2019
17:00

Hong Kong	29–19	South Korea

National Stadium, Kaohsiung

14 December 2019
19:00

Chinese Taipei	14–7	Singapore

National Stadium, Kaohsiung

== See also ==
- List of sporting events in Taiwan
