= 2019 World Rugby Under 20 Trophy =

Tournament details
- Host: Brazil
- Date: July 9–21
- Teams: 8

Final positions
- Champions: Japan
- Runner-up: Portugal
- Third place: Tonga

Tournament statistics
- Matches played: 16
- Top scorer(s): (Canada) Will Percillier (65)
- Most tries: (Portugal) Raffaele Storti (9)

The 2019 World Rugby U20 Trophy was the twelfth annual international rugby union competition for Under 20 national teams, second-tier world championship.

The event was held at the Estádio Martins Pereira in São José dos Campos from 9 until 21 July and was organized by rugby's governing body, World Rugby.

== Qualified teams ==
A total of eight teams played in the tournament. The host Brazil and the 2018 World Rugby Under 20 Championship relegation country Japan qualified automatically. The remaining six countries qualified through a qualification process in regional competitions (North America, South America, Europe, Africa, Asia, Oceania).

Host (1)

- Brazil

Relegated from 2018 JWC

- Japan

Asia Rugby (1)

- Hong Kong

Rugby Africa (1)

- Kenya

Sudamérica Rugby (1)

- Uruguay

Rugby Americas North (1)

- Canada

Rugby Europe (1)

- Portugal

Oceania Rugby (1)

- Tonga

== Pool Stage ==
=== Pool A ===
Team	Pld	W	D	L	PF	PA	PD	TF	TA	Pts
Japan	3	3	0	0	150	89	+61	22	13	15
Uruguay	3	2	0	1	146	67	+79	22	9	11
Kenya	3	1	0	2	71	135	−64	8	21	5
Brazil	3	0	0	3	58	134	−76	9	18	2

9 July 2019
12:00

Japan	56–24	Brazil
	Report

Estádio Martins Pereira, São José dos Campos

9 July 2019
17:00

Kenya	11–63	Uruguay
	Report

Estádio Martins Pereira, São José dos Campos

13 July 2019
14:00

Japan	46–31	Uruguay
	Report

Estádio Martins Pereira, São José dos Campos

13 July 2019
17:00

Kenya	26–24	Brazil
	Report

Estádio Martins Pereira, São José dos Campos

17 July 2019
12:00

Japan	48–34	Kenya
	Report

Estádio Martins Pereira, São José dos Campos

17 July 2019
17:00

Uruguay	52–10	Brazil
	Report

Estádio Martins Pereira, São José dos Campos

=== Pool B ===
Team	Pld	W	D	L	PF	PA	PD	TF	TA	Pts
Portugal	3	3	0	0	148	51	+97	8	3	15
Tonga	3	2	0	1	93	77	+16	14	6	10
Canada	3	1	0	2	124	101	+23	19	14	7
Hong Kong	3	0	0	3	65	201	−136	9	30	1

9 July 2019
14:00

Tonga	26–25	Canada
	Report

Estádio Martins Pereira, São José dos Campos

9 July 2019
19:00

Portugal	59–27	Hong Kong
	Report

Estádio Martins Pereira, São José dos Campos

13 July 2019
12:00

Tonga	64–12	Hong Kong
	Report

Estádio Martins Pereira, São José dos Campos

13 July 2019
19:00

Portugal	49–21	Canada
	Report

Estádio Martins Pereira, São José dos Campos

17 July 2019
14:00

Tonga	3–40	Portugal
	Report

Estádio Martins Pereira, São José dos Campos

17 July 2019
19:00

Hong Kong	26–78	Canada
	Report

Estádio Martins Pereira, São José dos Campos

== Finals ==
7th place

21 July 2019
17:00

Brazil	32-29	Hong Kong
	Report

Estádio Martins Pereira, São José dos Campos

5th place

21 July 2019
12:00

Kenya	13-52	Canada
	Report

Estádio Martins Pereira, São José dos Campos

3rd place

21 July 2019
14:00

Uruguay	27-29	Tonga
	Report

Estádio Martins Pereira, São José dos Campos

Final

21 July 2019
19:00

Japan	35-34	Portugal
	Report

Estádio Martins Pereira, São José dos Campos
