= Toco Para Vos =

Uruguayan cumbia pop group

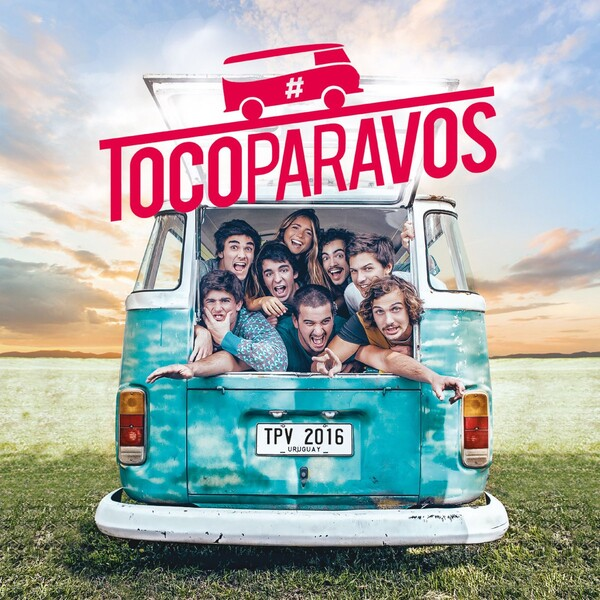

Background information
- Origin: Montevideo, Uruguay
- Genres: Cumbia pop
- Years active: 2013-2021
- Labels: Warner Music Group
- Members: Bautista Mascia; Meri Deal; Andrés Urioste; Sebastián Muñoz; Ignacio Hounie; Pablo Battro; Joaquín Slinger; Martín Zerbino; Alejandro García; Felipe Sardina

Toco Para Vos (Spanish for 'I play for you') was a Uruguayan band formed in 2013 in Montevideo.

== History ==
Toco Para Vos was formed in late 2013 when Bautista Mascia, Andrés Urioste and Sebastián Muñoz, three classmates at the Stella Maris College and rugby teammates came together to create a musical group and included Mascia's cousin, Meri Deal as their lead vocalist.

In April 2014, the band released their debut single "Hasta la luna", along with the music video. Throughout that year, the singles "8 de Otoño", "Hacer un Puente", and "Algo Más" were also released. In April 2015 they released "Solo Necesito", which quickly became a hit and gave the band international breakthrough in several Latin American countries.

In November a joint single with the Argentine band Los Bonnitos called "De vez en tiempo" was released. In December the band signed with the Warner Music Group label, and in the southern hemisphere summer of 2016 it made its first international tour along the Argentine Atlantic coast. In January, the single "Bailemos Juntos" was released, along with the music video filmed in Punta del Este.

In March 2016, it was announced that the group had begun recording their first studio album. It was released on June 17, 2016, including the unreleased singles "Tu Beso y Tu Piel" and "Entre nosotros", featuring Spanish singer Álex Ubago. In 2016 the band also released "Una Historia" and "Vale la pena" in May and November, respectively.

In January 2017, the band released "Tan infinito", a reggaeton and Latin pop song, the first of these genres that they recorded. In February the band performed at the Talca Independence Festival in Chile. In May, the Argentine actor, singer and YouTuber Lionel Ferro collaborated with them on the song "Uh, Amor". In July they released a new reggaeton song, called "Tengo un Vicio", and on December 15, "Me Provoca".

In February 2018, Mascia and Deal moved to Miami to record the urban contemporary single "Vete De Mi Vida", produced by Pablo Mejía and David Escobar, both members of the Colombian group Piso 21. It was released on July 6. Three months later "Me Voy Contigo" along with the music video filmed in Medellín was released.

In December 2018 the band released "Mi Ilusión" and in March 2019, "Vuelve Otra Vez". "Un Poquito" and "El Bombo y El Tacho" were also released that year. Meri Deal had started a solo career in February after opening for Ed Sheeran's show in Montevideo with Passenger. During 2020, the band went on hiatus, in which members Deal and Mascia continued their solo careers.

In January 2021 the band reunited to release the single "Se Picó", featuring Uruguayan singers El Reja and Marka Akme. The single made the Billboard Argentina Hot 100 list.
