= Götz Uhrig =

German theoretical physicist

- Occupation: Physicist
- Employer: TU Dortmund University

Götz Silvester Uhrig is a German theoretical physicist in Condensed Matter Theory. in the Department of Physics of TU Dortmund University having published over 200 scientific articles.

== Education ==
Uhrig was born in Karlsruhe and began his academic journey in Physics and Mathematics at the TU Darmstadt, where he completed his Vordiplomas between 1984 and 1986. He then pursued advanced studies in France, earning a Licence en Magistère de Physique at the Université Paris 7 (now Université Paris-Diderot) from 1986 to 1987. Returning to Germany, Uhrig completed his Diploma in Physics at the Ruprecht-Karls-University Heidelberg between 1987 and 1990. Uhrig earned his doctorate in April 1994 at RWTH Aachen University, under the supervision of Prof. Dieter Vollhardt.

== Professional career ==
After completing his PhD, Uhrig began his postdoctoral research career as a researcher in the group of Prof. Erwin Müller-Hartmann at the University of Cologne from January 1994 to September 1995. He continued his postdoctoral research with Prof. Heinz Schulz at the Université Paris-Sud (now part of Université Paris-Saclay) from October 1995 to December 1996. Returning to Germany in 1997, Uhrig resumed his work at the University of Cologne. In 1999, he achieved his Habilitation and continued his research in Cologne till 2004. In April 2005, Uhrig was appointed Associate Professor at Saarland University in Saarbrücken. Since 2006, he is a Full Professor at TU Dortmund University.

At TU Dortmund University, Uhrig held administrative roles. From 2008 to 2014, he served as Vice-Dean of the Department of Physics becoming Dean in 2014 until 2016. Uhrig served as a member of the Editorial Board of the European Physical Journal B and as one of the Curators of the Physik-Journal of the DPG, Deutsche Physikalische Gesellschaft. He served in the Senate of TU Dortmund University. Since 2024, he is elected Fachkollegiat of the DFG, Deutsche Forschungsgemeinschaft.

== Research ==
Götz Uhrig studies strongly correlated systems, in particular quantum magnets. Among others, he developed systematic basis transformations as theoretical tool to elucidate the under-lying physical properties. In recent years, non-equilibrium issues and topological properties are taken into focus. He contributed to quantum error mitigation by discovering particular dynamic decoupling schemes.

== Selected publications ==
- 1Hawashin, Bilal; Sirker, Jesko; Uhrig, Götz S. (November 2024). "Topological properties of single-particle states decaying into a continuum due to interaction". Physical Review Research. 6 (4) L042041. arXiv:2310.09957. Bibcode:2024PhRvR...6d2041H. doi:10.1103/PhysRevResearch.6.L042041.
- 2Bolsmann, Kathrin; Khudoyberdiev, Asliddin; Uhrig, Götz S. (September 2023). "Switching the Magnetization in Quantum Antiferromagnets". PRX Quantum. 4 (3) 030332. arXiv:2303.15398. Bibcode:2023PRXQ....4c0332B. doi:10.1103/PRXQuantum.4.030332.
- 3Uhrig, Götz S. (March 2020). "Quantum coherence from commensurate driving with laser pulses and decay". SciPost Physics. 8 (3) 040. arXiv:1906.04283. Bibcode:2020ScPP....8...40U. doi:10.21468/SciPostPhys.8.3.040.
- 4Uhrig, Götz S.; Kalthoff, Mona H.; Freericks, James K. (2019). "Positivity of the spectral densities of retarded Floquet Green functions". Physical Review Letters. 122 (13) 130604. arXiv:1808.10199. Bibcode:2019PhRvL.122m0604U. doi:10.1103/PhysRevLett.122.130604. PMID 31012632.
- 5Powalski, Michael; Schmidt, Kai P.; Uhrig, Götz S. (January 2018). "Mutually attracting spin waves in the square-lattice quantum antiferromagnet". SciPost Physics. 4 (1): 001. arXiv:1701.04730. Bibcode:2018ScPP....4....1P. doi:10.21468/SciPostPhys.4.1.001.
- 6) Uhrig, Götz S. (March 2007). "Keeping a Quantum Bit Alive by Optimized π-Pulse Sequences". Physical Review Letters. 98 (10) 100504. arXiv:quant-ph/0609203. Bibcode:2007PhRvL..98j0504U. doi:10.1103/PhysRevLett.98.100504. PMID 17358521.
- Knetter, Christian; Schmidt, Kai P.; Uhrig, Götz S. (July 2003). "The structure of operators in effective particle-conserving models". Journal of Physics A: Mathematical and General. 36 (29): 7889. arXiv:cond-mat/0306333. Bibcode:2003JPhA...36.7889K. doi:10.1088/0305-4470/36/29/302.
