= 2017 U-19 Asia Rugby Championship =

- Date: 10, 16 December 2017
- Countries: Hong Kong; Sri Lanka

The 2017 U-19 Asia Rugby Championship is an international rugby union competition for Under 20 national teams in Asia. The winners will secure a berth at the 2018 World Rugby Under 20 Trophy.

== Top division ==
The top division will be hosted in Sri Lanka and Hong Kong on 10 and 16 December 2017 respectively. It will be played over two legs.

Champions and qualification
for the 2018 World Rugby Under 20 Trophy.

Position	Nation	Games				Points			Bonus		Point
Position	Nation	Played	Won	Drawn	Lost	For	Against	Difference	Tries	Losing	Point
1	Hong Kong	2	2	0	0	77	15	62	2	0	10
2	Sri Lanka	2	0	0	2	15	77	-62	0	0	0
Source: Macoocoo

=== Matches ===
10 December 2017
15:00 SLST (UTC+5:30)

Sri Lanka	8–37	Hong Kong
Try: Disanayake 41' m Pen: Fernando (1/2) 10'	Report	Try: Altier 7' c Nisbet 24' m Ramage 30' m, 48' m Chong 34' m Ramage 44' m Cooke 52' m Con: Altier (1/7) 8'

Havelock Stadium, Colombo

16 December 2017
18:30 HKT (UTC+8)

Hong Kong	40–7	Sri Lanka
Try: Ramage 4' c Denmark 16' c Altier 37' c Cooke 54' c Tam 57' m Nisbet 61' c Con: Altier 5', 17', 38', 54', 62' (5/6)	Report	Try: Fernando 24' c Con: Silva 25' (1/1)

Hong Kong Football Club, Hong Kong

== Division 1 ==
Division 1 matches will be held by the Philippines at the International School Manila in Taguig from 13–16 December 2017.

2017 U-19 Asia Rugby Championship division 1
Tournament details
- Host: Philippines
- Date: 13 – 16 December 2017
- Countries: Malaysia; Philippines; South Korea; United Arab Emirates

Semi-finals
13 December 2017
Philippines	6
South Korea	27
13 December 2017
Malaysia	13
United Arab Emirates	34

Final
16 December 2017
South Korea	12
United Arab Emirates	19
Third place play-off
16 December 2017
Philippines	19
Malaysia	36

=== Matches ===
==== Semi-finals ====
13 December 2017
17:00 PHT (UTC+8)

Philippines	6–27	South Korea

International School Manila, Taguig

13 December 2017
18:45 PHT (UTC+8)

Malaysia	13–34	United Arab Emirates

International School Manila, Taguig

==== 3rd place playoff ====
16 December 2017
14:00 PHT (UTC+8)

Philippines	19–36	Malaysia

International School Manila, Taguig

==== Final ====
16 December 2017
16:00 PHT (UTC+8)

South Korea	12–19	United Arab Emirates
	Report

International School Manila, Taguig
