= Romina Uhrig =

Argentine politician

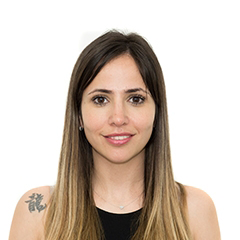

National Deputy
- In office 10 December 2019 – 10 December 2021
- Constituency: Buenos Aires

Personal details
- Born: 27 January 1988 (age 38) San Martín, Buenos Aires, Argentina
- Party: Justicialist Party
- Other political affiliations: Unidad Ciudadana (2017–2019); Frente de Todos (2019–2021)

Romina Maricel Uhrig (born 27 January 1988) is an Argentine former politician who served as a National Deputy of the Argentine Congress from 2019 to 2021. A member of the Justicialist Party, she was elected in Buenos Aires Province as part of the Unidad Ciudadana coalition.

In 2022, she became a contestant of the reality TV series Gran Hermano.

== Early life and career ==
Uhrig was born on 27 January 1988 in San Martín, Buenos Aires. She studied to be a physical education teacher, later entering politics in the municipality of Moreno, Buenos Aires. She would serve as undersecretary of institutional affairs, and later as secretary of productive development, during the administration of Mayor Walter Festa, whom she would eventually marry.

Festa and Uhrig had three daughters. They have since separated.

She is questioned because she attended to parties at the presidential residence in Olivos, during the COVID quarantines while the people was ordered not to go out.

The judiciary investigates her, after having been charged with her ex-husband for corruption and illicit enrichment.

== Congresswoman ==
In the 2017 legislative election, Uhrig ran for a seat in the Argentine Chamber of Deputies as the 15th candidate in the Unidad Ciudadana list in Buenos Aires Province. The list came second with 36.28% of the vote, not nearly enough for Uhrig to make it past the D'Hondt cut.

Following the 2019 general election, deputy Fernando Espinoza resigned from his seat in order to take office as mayor of La Matanza. Uhrig was called in to fill in Espinoza's vacancy for the remainder of his 2017–2021 term. She took office as deputy on 10 December 2019.

She formed part of the parliamentary commissions on Natural Resources and Human Environment Conservation, Population and Human Development, Women and Diversity, Elderly People, and Tax Rules and Prevision Analysis. During her time in Congress, she was known for her vocal support for the legalisation of abortion in Argentina, although she abstained from voting when the Voluntary Interruption of Pregnancy Bill was debated by the Chamber of Deputies. She also supported the travesti-trans labour quota initiative.

Her term as deputy expired on 10 December 2021. She did not run for re-election.

== Gran Hermano and realities ==
In October 2022, she was confirmed as one of the contestants in the 10th season of Gran Hermano, the Argentine version of the Big Brother reality format.

Realities shows
Time	Title	Role	Notes
2022–2023	Gran Hermano	Contestant	4th place; Season 10
2023	MasterChef Argentina	Guest	Season 3
2023	Bailando 2023	Contestant	17th place
2024	Gran Hermano	Guest	Season 11
2026	Gran Hermano: Golden Generation	Guest	

== Electoral history ==
Electoral history of Romina Uhrig
Election	Office	List	#	District	Votes			Result	Ref.
Election	Office	List	#	District	Total	%	P.	Result	Ref.
2017	National Deputy	Unidad Ciudadana	15	Buenos Aires Province	3,383,114	36.28%	2nd (Note: Presented on an electoral list. The data shown represents the share of the vote the entire party/alliance received in that constituency.)	Not elected (Note: Assumed office on 10 December 2019 following the resignation of Fernando Espinoza.)	
