= South American Junior Rugby Championship =

International sporting competition

- Sport: Rugby union
- Founded: 1972
- No. of teams: 9
- Continent: South America
- Most recent champion: Argentina

The South American Junior Rugby Championship is an annual rugby union competition that features teams from South America. The tournament began in 1972 with Argentina as the host, which saw the locals win the title. It was not until 2008 that the first official Division B tournament was held, which was won by Brazil. In 2014, an addition competition was added, the CONSUR Cup, which was contested by Argentina and the top team of the A Division that year.

In 1999, the minimum age permitted was changed from U18 to U19. Since 2004, the tournament champion (excluding Argentina) qualifies to the next year's World Rugby U20 Trophy, organised by the World Rugby. Argentina automatically qualified for the World Rugby Under 20 Championship.

== Current divisions (2015) ==
CONSUR Cup Argentina Uruguay	Division A Brazil Chile Paraguay Uruguay	Division B Colombia Peru Venezuela Mexico (invited)

== Results ==
=== Junior Consur Cup ===
Year	Host	Winner	Runner-up
2014	Uruguay	Argentina	Uruguay
2015	Argentina	Argentina	Uruguay
2016	Uruguay	Argentina	Uruguay

=== Past tournaments 1972–2014 ===
==== Division A ====
Year	Host	Winner	Runner-up	Third place	Fourth place	Fifth place
1972	Argentina	Argentina	Chile	Uruguay	Paraguay	Brazil
1974	various	Argentina	?	?	?	?
1976	Chile	Argentina	Uruguay	Chile	Paraguay	
1978	Brazil	Argentina	Uruguay	Chile	Paraguay	Chile
1980	?	Uruguay	?	?	?	
1982	Uruguay	Argentina	Uruguay	Paraguay	Chile	Brazil
1984	Chile	Argentina	Chile	Uruguay	Paraguay	
1986	Argentina	Argentina	Chile	Uruguay	Paraguay	
1988	Paraguay	Argentina	Uruguay	Paraguay	Chile	Brazil
1990	Chile	Argentina	Chile	Uruguay	Brazil	Paraguay
1993	various	Argentina	?	?	?	?
1994	various	Argentina	Uruguay	Chile	Brazil	Paraguay
1996	Chile	Argentina	Uruguay	Chile	Paraguay	
1998	Argentina	Argentina	Uruguay	Chile		
1999	Brazil	Argentina	Uruguay	Chile	?	?
2000	Chile	Argentina	Chile	Uruguay	Paraguay	
2002	Argentina	Argentina	Chile	Uruguay	Paraguay	
2003	Paraguay	Argentina	Chile	Uruguay	Paraguay	
2004	Uruguay	Argentina	Uruguay	Chile	Paraguay	
2005	Chile	Argentina	Chile	Uruguay	Paraguay	
2006	Argentina	Argentina	Uruguay	Chile	Paraguay	
2007	Uruguay	Argentina	Uruguay	Chile	Paraguay	
2008	Argentina	Argentina	Chile	Uruguay	Paraguay	
2009	Argentina	Argentina	Uruguay	Chile	Paraguay	
2010	Argentina	Argentina	Uruguay	Chile	Paraguay	
2011	Paraguay	Argentina	Chile	Uruguay	Paraguay	
2012	Argentina	Argentina	Chile	Uruguay	Paraguay	
2013	Brazil	Argentina	Uruguay	Chile	Brazil	
2014	Uruguay	Uruguay	Chile	Brazil	Paraguay	
2015	Paraguay	Uruguay	Chile	Brazil	Paraguay	

=== Past tournaments 2008–2014 ===
==== Division B ====
Year	Host	Winner	Runner-up	Third place	Fourth place
2008	Brazil	Brazil	Colombia	Peru	Venezuela
2009	Peru	Colombia	Peru	Venezuela	
2010	Colombia	Colombia	Peru	Venezuela	Costa Rica
2011	Peru	Colombia	Venezuela	Peru	Costa Rica
2012	Venezuela	Brazil	Colombia	Venezuela	Peru
2013	Paraguay	Paraguay	Colombia	Peru	Venezuela
2014	Peru	Colombia	Mexico	Peru	Venezuela

== See also ==
- Sudamérica Rugby
