= Brazil national under-20 rugby union team =

Brazil
- Union: Rugby union in Brazil
- Nickname: Curumins
- Founded: 1972

The Brazil under 20 rugby team is the junior national rugby union team from Brazil. They replace the two former age grade teams Under 19s and Under 21s. The team competed at the World Rugby U20 Trophy.

== Current squad ==
Squad to 2019 World Rugby Under 20 Trophy.

| Forwards: Naasson Porto; Leonardo de Sousa; Henrique Ribeir; Samoel Bertan; Fillipo Bungo; Guilerme Dias; Rafael dos Santos; Adrio Melo; Felipe Quevedo; Marcos Melo (c); Henrique Silva; Gabriel Oliveira; Weslley Barbosa; Carlos Rafael de Moura; Joao Vitor Furst; Geronimo Olivares | Backs: Felipe Cunha; Lucas Spago; Murilo Bonesso; Joel dos Santos; Gabriel Quirino; Vincent Quirino; Carlos Eduardo Proenca; Matheus Oliveira; Allison Kalkmann; Huylherme Rangel |
