= Papua New Guinea national under-20 rugby union team =

Papua New Guinea Under 20
- Union: Papua New Guinea Rugby Football Union
Team kit

The Papua New Guinea national under-20 rugby union team is for Papua New Guinean rugby union players aged 20 or under on January 1 of the year during which they are selected. The team has played at the World Rugby U20 Trophy and also competes at the Oceania U20 Championship as of 2015.

Under 20 age grade rugby came into existence, as a result of the IRB combining the Under 19 Rugby World Championship and Under 21 Rugby World Championship into a single IRB Junior World Championship tournament.

== 2009 Junior World Trophy ==
In April 2009, Kenya hosted the 2009 IRB Junior World Rugby Trophy. PNG lost their first two matches against Romania and Chile before winning against South Korea. The team finished sixth in the tournament after being defeated by Namibia in the 5th place play-off by 48–43.

== 2010 Junior World Trophy ==
The 2010 IRB Junior World Rugby Trophy was held in Russia in May 2010. PNG lost their three pool matches against Italy, Uruguay, and Romania. The team finished eighth in the tournament after being defeated by Zimbabwe in the 7th place play-off by 46–22.
