= 2015 African Rugby Under-19 Cup Division "A" =

- Date: August 26 – August 29, 2015
- Countries: 4
- Champions: Namibia (6th title)

Tournament statistics
- Matches played: 4

The 2015 African Rugby Under–19 Cup (Rugby Africa Championship) Division A was the ninth edition of the African Rugby Under-19 Cup for Under 19 national teams. It was held in Harare, Zimbabwe from August 26 to August 29.

The tournament served as Africa's qualifier for the 2016 World Rugby Under 20 Trophy.

Namibia won the tournament and as a result qualified for the Junior Rugby Trophy. Zimbabwe automatically qualified for the Trophy due to being selected as hosts.

== Matches ==
=== First round ===
26 August 2015
15:00 ZWT (UTC+02)

Namibia	49–12	Uganda
Try: De Klerk J. 7’ c Beukes H. (3) 13’ c, 34' c, 39’ c Breedt J. 63’ m Otto H. 70’ c Losper L. 72’ c Con: Oliver H. (6) 8’, 14’, 35’, 40’, 71’, ’73	Report	Try: Kasito A. 25’ m Epillo P. 29’ c Con: Epillo P. 26’

St George's College, Harare
Referee: Geoff Amess (Zimbabwe)

26 August 2015
17:00 ZWT (UTC+02)

Zimbabwe	25–17	Kenya
Try: Matoramusha B. (2) 6’ m, 9’ m Katsvere S. 24’ c Mudzengerer E. 46’ m Con: Gando J. 65’ Pen: Gando J. 25’	Report	Try: Onyala A. 16’ c Odhiambo A. 32’ m Kuka C. 51’ m Con: Odhiambo A. 17’

St George's College, Harare
Referee: Garchi Akram (Tunisia)

=== Final round ===
==== 3rd place match ====
29 August 2015
16:00 ZWT (UTC+02)

Kenya	21–5	Uganda
Try: Ochar J. 11’ Songoi P 41’ Odhiambo A. 69’ Con: Ochar J. 12’ Onyala V. 42’ Odhiambo A. 70’	Report	Try: Kisiga T. 44’

St George's College, Harare
Referee: Garchi Akram (Tunisia)

==== Championship match ====
29 August 2015
18:00 ZWT (UTC+02)

Zimbabwe	32–34	Namibia
Try: Katsevere S. (3) 19’, 32’, 64’ Manhombo M. (2) 38’, 71’ Con: Gando J. (2); Pen: Gando J. 33’	Report	Try: Dentunger B. (2) 13’, 15’ Smith W. 21’ Beukes J. 69’ Mcnab C. 77’ Con: Oliver H. (3); Pen: Oliver H. 5’

St George's College, Harare
Referee: Victor Oduor (Kenya)

== See also ==
- Africa Cup
