= 2006 Under 19 Rugby World Championship =

Tournament details
- Host nation: United Arab Emirates
- Dates: 2006-04-04 – 2006-04-21
- No. of nations: 24

Final positions
- Champions: Australia
- Runner-up: New Zealand

Tournament statistics
- Matches played: 60
- Top scorer(s): Colin Slade New Zealand

The 2006 Under 19 Rugby World Championship took place in United Arab Emirates between 4 April and 21 April 2006. Australia won the final over New Zealand 17–13.

== Pool/standings ==
The IRB setting for this tournament was that the matches were to be played between two pools from which the top 4 teams qualified for the semifinals and the team that finished at the bottom of the Division A pool was to be relegated to the Division B.

- Pool A played against Pool D
- Pool B played against Pool C

Match points were awarded on the basis of 4 points for a Win, 2 points for a draw and 0 points for a Loss. Bonus points were awarded for teams scoring 4 tries or more and to losing teams who lost be 7 points or less.

== Division A ==
=== Groups ===
| Group A | | Group B | | Group C | | Group D | |
|---|---|---|---|---|---|---|---|
| 1 | South Africa | 2 | New Zealand | 3 | Australia | 4 | England |
| 8 | Argentina | 7 | Romania | 6 | Wales | 5 | France |
| 9 | Ireland | 10 | Scotland | 11 | Japan | 12 | Western Samoa |

=== Group phase ===
| Pos. | Team | Matches | | | | Points | | | BP | TOTAL |
| Pos. | Team | M | W | D | L | + | - | +/- | BP | TOTAL |
|---|---|---|---|---|---|---|---|---|---|---|
| 1. | New Zealand | 3 | 3 | 0 | 0 | 150 | 41 | +109 | 2 | 14 |
| 2. | France | 3 | 3 | 0 | 0 | 87 | 33 | +54 | 1 | 13 |
| 3. | Australia | 3 | 2 | 0 | 1 | 183 | 34 | +149 | 3 | 11 |
| 4. | England | 3 | 2 | 0 | 1 | 89 | 58 | +31 | 3 | 11 |
| 5. | Wales | 3 | 2 | 0 | 1 | 119 | 43 | +76 | 2 | 10 |
| 6. | Ireland | 3 | 2 | 0 | 1 | 51 | 57 | -6 | 0 | 8 |
| 7. | Argentina | 3 | 1 | 0 | 2 | 45 | 55 | -10 | 2 | 6 |
| 8. | South Africa | 3 | 1 | 0 | 2 | 65 | 87 | -22 | 1 | 5 |
| 9. | Scotland | 3 | 1 | 0 | 2 | 56 | 113 | -57 | 1 | 5 |
| 10. | Japan | 3 | 1 | 0 | 2 | 40 | 155 | -115 | 1 | 5 |
| 11. | Western Samoa | 3 | 0 | 0 | 3 | 23 | 70 | -47 | 2 | 2 |
| 12. | Romania | 3 | 0 | 0 | 3 | 26 | 188 | -162 | 0 | 0 |

5 April 2006

| South Africa | 3–42 | France |

Dubai Exiles Rugby Ground, Dubai

5 April 2006

| Argentina | 10–8 | Western Samoa |

Sharjah Wanderers Ground, Sharjah

5 April 2006

| New Zealand | 38–14 | Wales |

Dubai Exiles Rugby Ground 2, Dubai

5 April 2006

| Romania | 17–30 | Japan |

Sharjah Wanderers Ground 2, Sharjah

5 April 2006

| Ireland | 17–16 | England |

Dubai Exiles Rugby Ground, Dubai

5 April 2006

| Scotland | 3–78 | Australia |

Sharjah Wanderers Ground, Sharjah

9 April 2006

| South Africa | 44–0 | Western Samoa |

Sharjah Wanderers Ground, Sharjah

9 April 2006

| Ireland | 18–26 | France |

Dubai Exiles Rugby Ground, Dubai

9 April 2006

| Argentina | 23–28 | England |

Sharjah Wanderers Ground 2, Sharjah

9 April 2006

| Romania | 9–88 | Australia |

Dubai Exiles Rugby Ground 2, Dubai

9 April 2006

| New Zealand | 90–10 | Japan |

Sharjah Wanderers Ground, Sharjah

9 April 2006

| Scotland | 5–35 | Wales |

Dubai Exiles Rugby Ground, Dubai

13 April 2006

| New Zealand | 22–17 | Australia |

Dubai Exiles Rugby Ground, Dubai

13 April 2006

| Scotland | 48–0 | Japan |

Sharjah Wanderers Ground, Sharjah

13 April 2006

| Romania | 0–70 | Wales |

Sharjah Wanderers Ground 2, Sharjah

13 April 2006

| Argentina | 12–19 | France |

Dubai Exiles Rugby Ground 2, Dubai

13 April 2006

| Ireland | 16–15 | Western Samoa |

Sharjah Wanderers Ground, Sharjah

13 April 2006

| South Africa | 18–45 | England |

Dubai Exiles Rugby Ground, Dubai

=== Knock out phase ===
==== 9th-place play-off ====
Semi-finals
17 April 2006
Japan | 0
Western Samoa | 26
17 April 2006
Scotland | 38
Romania | 10

Final
21 April 2006
Western Samoa | 12
Scotland | 18
Third place
21 April 2006
Japan | 13
Romania | 13

17 April 2006
18:30

| Japan | 0–26 | Western Samoa |

Sharjah Wanderers Ground 2, Sharjah

17 April 2006
18:15

| Scotland | 38–10 | Romania |

Sharjah Wanderers Ground, Sharjah

21 April 2006

| Western Samoa | 12–18 | Scotland |

Sharjah Wanderers Ground, Sharjah

21 April 2006

| Japan | 13–13 | Romania |

Sharjah Wanderers Ground 2, Sharjah

==== 5th-place play-off ====
Semi-finals
17 April 2006
Ireland | 19
Argentina | 13
17 April 2006
Wales | 33
South Africa | 21

Final
21 April 2006
Ireland | 20
Wales | 15
Third place
21 April 2006
Argentina | 26
South Africa | 7

17 April 2006
20:00

| Ireland | 19–13 | Argentina |

Sharjah Wanderers Ground, Sharjah

17 April 2006
18:30

| Wales | 33–21 | South Africa |

Dubai Exiles Rugby Ground 2, Dubai

21 April 2006

| Ireland | 20–15 | Wales |

Dubai Exiles Rugby Ground 2, Dubai

21 April 2006

| Argentina | 26–7 | South Africa |

Sharjah Wanderers Ground, Sharjah

==== 1st-place play-off ====
Semi-finals
17 April 2006
New Zealand | 24
England | 11
17 April 2006
France | 16
Australia | 26

Final
21 April 2006
New Zealand | 13
Australia | 17
Third place
21 April 2006
England | 12
France | 12

17 April 2006
20:00

| New Zealand | 24–11 | England |

Dubai Exiles Rugby Ground, Dubai

17 April 2006
18:15

| France | 16–26 | Australia |

Dubai Exiles Rugby Ground, Dubai

21 April 2006

| New Zealand | 13–17 | Australia |
| Try: Sanders (2) 57', 62'; Con: Slade (0/2); Pen: Slade (1/2) 27' | Report | Try: Linde 15' c, Turner 18' c Con: Lealiifano (2/2); Drop: A Fainga'a 77' |

Dubai Exiles Rugby Ground, Dubai

21 April 2006

| England | 12–12 | France |

Dubai Exiles Rugby Ground, Dubai

== Division B ==
=== Groups ===
| Group A | | Group B | | Group C | | Group D | |
|---|---|---|---|---|---|---|---|
| 1 | Georgia | 2 | Uruguay | 3 | Italy | 4 | Tonga |
| 8 | Canada | 7 | Chinese Taipei | 6 | United States | 5 | South Korea |
| 9 | Chile | 10 | Fiji | 11 | Russia | 12 | Namibia |

=== Group phase ===
| Pos. | Team | Matches | | | | Points | | | BP | TOTAL |
| Pos. | Team | M | W | D | L | + | - | +/- | BP | TOTAL |
|---|---|---|---|---|---|---|---|---|---|---|
| 1. | Fiji | 3 | 3 | 0 | 0 | 129 | 36 | +93 | 3 | 15 |
| 2. | Tonga | 3 | 3 | 0 | 0 | 69 | 29 | +40 | 2 | 14 |
| 3. | Italy | 3 | 2 | 0 | 1 | 174 | 56 | +118 | 3 | 11 |
| 4. | Canada | 3 | 2 | 0 | 1 | 129 | 39 | +90 | 2 | 10 |
| 5. | Georgia | 3 | 2 | 0 | 1 | 80 | 25 | +55 | 2 | 10 |
| 6. | Uruguay | 3 | 2 | 0 | 1 | 74 | 43 | +31 | 1 | 9 |
| 7. | Chile | 3 | 1 | 0 | 2 | 45 | 48 | -3 | 1 | 5 |
| 8. | Russia | 3 | 1 | 0 | 2 | 42 | 78 | -36 | 1 | 5 |
| 9. | Namibia | 3 | 1 | 0 | 2 | 30 | 49 | -19 | 0 | 4 |
| 10. | United States | 3 | 0 | 1 | 2 | 23 | 100 | -77 | 0 | 2 |
| 11. | Chinese Taipei | 3 | 0 | 1 | 2 | 31 | 160 | -129 | 0 | 2 |
| 12. | South Korea | 3 | 0 | 0 | 3 | 13 | 176 | -163 | 0 | 0 |

4 April 2006

| Canada | 29-10 | Namibia |

Dubai Exiles Rugby Ground, Dubai

4 April 2006

| Uruguay | 35-3 | United States |

Sharjah Wanderers Ground, Sharjah

4 April 2006

| Chile | 6-24 | Tonga |

Dubai Exiles Rugby Ground 2, Dubai

4 April 2006

| Chinese Taipei | 14-36 | Russia |

Sharjah Wanderers Ground 2, Sharjah

4 April 2006

| Fiji | 38-30 | Italy |

Dubai Exiles Rugby Ground, Dubai

4 April 2006

| Georgia | 57-3 | South Korea |

Sharjah Wanderers Ground, Sharjah

8 April 2006

| Georgia | 14-6 | Namibia |

Sharjah Wanderers Ground, Sharjah

8 April 2006

| Canada | 14-29 | Tonga |

Dubai Exiles Rugby Ground, Dubai

8 April 2006

| Chile | 33-10 | South Korea |

Dubai Exiles Rugby Ground 2, Dubai

8 April 2006

| Uruguay | 21-3 | Russia |

Sharjah Wanderers Ground 2, Sharjah

8 April 2006

| Chinese Taipei | 0-107 | Italy |

Sharjah Wanderers Ground, Sharjah

8 April 2006

| Fiji | 48-3 | United States |

Dubai Exiles Rugby Ground, Dubai

12 April 2006

| Georgia | 9-16 | Tonga |

Sharjah Wanderers Ground, Sharjah

12 April 2006

| Canada | 86-0 | South Korea |

Dubai Exiles Rugby Ground, Dubai

12 April 2006

| Chile | 6-14 | Namibia |

Sharjah Wanderers Ground 2, Sharjah

12 April 2006

| Uruguay | 18-37 | Italy |

Dubai Exiles Rugby Ground 2, Dubai

12 April 2006

| Chinese Taipei | 17-17 | United States |

Sharjah Wanderers Ground, Sharjah

12 April 2006

| Fiji | 43-3 | Russia |

Dubai Exiles Rugby Ground, Dubai

=== Knock out phase ===
==== 9th-place play-off ====
Semi-finals
16 April 2006
Namibia | 51
South Korea | 5
16 April 2006
United States | 14
Chinese Taipei | 15

Final
20 April 2006
Namibia | 57
Chinese Taipei | 10
Third place
20 April 2006
South Korea | 30
United States | 28

16 April 2006
18:00

| Namibia | 51-5 | South Korea |

Sharjah Wanderers Ground, Sharjah

16 April 2006
18:15

| United States | 14-15 | Chinese Taipei |

Sharjah Wanderers Ground 2, Sharjah

20 April 2006

| Namibia | 57-10 | Chinese Taipei |

Sharjah Wanderers Ground, Sharjah

20 April 2006

| South Korea | 30-28 | United States |

Sharjah Wanderers Ground 2, Sharjah

==== 5th-place play-off ====
Semi-finals
16 April 2006
Georgia | 33
Russia | 8
16 April 2006
Uruguay | 24
Chile | 5

Final
20 April 2006
Georgia | 38
Uruguay | 18
Third place
20 April 2006
Russia | 9
Chile | 10

16 April 2006
18:15

| Georgia | 33-8 | Russia |

Dubai Exiles Rugby Ground 2, Dubai

16 April 2006
20:00

| Uruguay | 24-5 | Chile |

Sharjah Wanderers Ground, Sharjah

20 April 2006

| Georgia | 38-18 | Uruguay |

Dubai Exiles Rugby Ground 2, Dubai

20 April 2006

| Russia | 9-10 | Chile |

Sharjah Wanderers Ground, Sharjah

==== 1st-place play-off ====
Semi-finals
16 April 2006
Fiji | 20
Canada | 13
16 April 2006
Tonga | 24
Italy | 10

Final
20 April 2006
Fiji | 22
Tonga | 14
Third place
20 April 2006
Canada | 8
Italy | 35

16 April 2006
20:00

| Fiji | 20-13 | Canada |

Dubai Exiles Rugby Ground, Dubai

16 April 2006
18:00

| Tonga | 24-10 | Italy |

Dubai Exiles Rugby Ground, Dubai

20 April 2006

| Fiji | 22-14 | Tonga |

Dubai Exiles Rugby Ground, Dubai

20 April 2006

| Canada | 8-35 | Italy |

Dubai Exiles Rugby Ground, Dubai

== Final standings ==
| Division A | Pos | Division B |
|---|---|---|
| Australia | 1 | Fiji * |
| New Zealand | 2 | Tonga |
| England | 3 | Italy |
| France | 4 | Canada |
| Ireland | 5 | Georgia |
| Wales | 6 | Uruguay |
| Argentina | 7 | Chile # |
| South Africa | 8 | Russia # |
| Scotland | 9 | Namibia # |
| Western Samoa | 10 | Chinese Taipei # |
| Japan | 11 | South Korea # |
| Romania * | 12 | United States # |

* Romania was initially demoted to Division B and Fiji promoted to Division A for next World Championship.

# Chile, Russia, Namibia, Chinese Taipei, South Korea and USA were relegated from Division B and had to enter regional competitions to qualify for next World Championship.

== Sources ==
- Official site
