= 2005 Under 19 Rugby World Championship =

Tournament details
- Host nation: South Africa
- Dates: 2006-04-01 – 2006-04-28
- No. of nations: 24

Final positions
- Champions: South Africa
- Runner-up: New Zealand
- Third place: Australia

Tournament statistics
- Matches played: 60

The 2005 Under 19 Rugby World Championship took place in South Africa between 1 April and 18 April 2005. South Africa won the final over New Zealand 20–15.

== Pool/standings ==
The IRB setting for this tournament was that the matches were to be played between two pools from which the top 4 teams qualified for the semifinals and the team that finished at the bottom of the Division A pool was to be relegated to the Division B.

- Pool A played against Pool D
- Pool B played against Pool C

Match points were awarded on the basis of 4 points for a Win, 2 points for a draw and 0 points for a Loss. Bonus points were awarded for teams scoring 4 tries or more and to losing teams who lost be 7 points or less.

== Division A ==
=== Groups ===
Group A		Group B		Group C		Group D	
1	New Zealand	2	France	3	South Africa	4	England
8	Japan	7	Ireland	6	Australia	5	Wales
9	Scotland	10	Argentina	11	Georgia	12	Romania

=== Group phase ===
Pos.	Team	Matches				Points			BP	TOTAL
Pos.	Team	M	W	D	L	+	-	+/-	BP	TOTAL
1.	South Africa	3	3	0	0	109	34	+75	2	14
2.	New Zealand	3	3	0	0	111	25	+86	2	14
3.	Australia	3	3	0	0	71	6	+65	1	13
4.	England	3	2	0	1	92	44	+48	3	11
5.	Wales	3	2	0	1	133	40	+93	2	10
6.	France	3	1	0	2	63	25	+38	3	7
7.	Romania	3	1	0	2	22	75	-53	1	5
8.	Argentina	3	1	0	2	44	106	-62	1	5
9.	Ireland	3	1	0	2	23	55	-32	0	4
10.	Scotland	3	1	0	2	31	83	-52	0	4
11.	Georgia	3	0	0	3	6	90	-84	0	0
12.	Japan	3	0	0	3	17	139	-122	0	0

1 April 2005
13:15

France	6–10	Australia

ABSA Stadium, Durban

1 April 2005
14:30

England	32–11	Scotland

Kings Park Stadium 2, Durban

1 April 2005
14:45

Ireland	16–0	Georgia

Kings Park Stadium 3, Durban

1 April 2005
15:00

Japan	5–15	Romania

Kings Park Stadium 10, Durban

1 April 2005
15:00

New Zealand	25–8	Wales

ABSA Stadium, Durban

1 April 2005
18:00

South Africa	62–18	Argentina

ABSA Stadium, Durban

5 April 2005
13:30

Scotland	12–44	Wales

Woodburn Stadium, Pietermaritzburg

5 April 2005
15:30

Japan	9–43	England

University of KwaZulu-Natal, Durban

5 April 2005
15:30

New Zealand	62–0	Romania

Durban High School, Durban

5 April 2005
15:30

France	48–0	Georgia

Glenwood High School, Durban

5 April 2005
15:30

South Africa	32–7	Ireland

Woodburn Stadium, Pietermaritzburg

5 April 2005
17:15

Argentina	0–38	Australia

Woodburn Stadium, Pietermaritzburg

9 April 2005
14:45

Ireland	0–23	Australia

ABSA Stadium, Durban

9 April 2005
15:30

Argentina	26–6	Georgia

Durban High School, Durban

9 April 2005
15:30

Scotland	8–7	Romania

Glenwood High School, Durban

9 April 2005
15:30

Japan	3–79	Wales

Woodburn Stadium, Pietermaritzburg

9 April 2005
16:30

South Africa	15–9	France

ABSA Stadium, Durban

9 April 2005
17:15

New Zealand	24–17	England

Woodburn Stadium, Pietermaritzburg

=== Knock out phase ===
==== 9th-place play-off ====
Semi-finals
13 April 2005
Ireland	36
Japan	18
13 April 2005
Scotland	32
Georgia	10

Final
17 April 2005
Ireland	15
Scotland	8
Third place
17 April 2005
Japan	24
Georgia	0

13 April 2005
15:30

Ireland	36–18	Japan

Glenwood High School, Durban

13 April 2005
15:30

Scotland	32–10	Georgia

Durban High School, Durban

17 April 2005
15:00

Ireland	15–8	Scotland

Kings Park Stadium 2, Durban

17 April 2005
12:45

Japan	24–0	Georgia

Kings Park Stadium 10, Durban

==== 5th-place play-off ====
Semi-finals
13 April 2005
Wales	36
Argentina	18
13 April 2005
France	36
Romania	17

Final
17 April 2005
Wales	10
France	13
Third place
17 April 2005
Argentina	13
Romania	21

13 April 2005
15:30

Wales	36–18	Argentina

University of KwaZulu-Natal, Durban

13 April 2005
16:45

France	36–17	Romania

Woodburn Stadium, Pietermaritzburg

17 April 2005
14:30

Wales	10–13	France

Kings Park Stadium 10, Durban

17 April 2005
14:45

Argentina	13–21	Romania

Kings Park Stadium 3, Durban

==== 1st-place play-off ====
Semi-finals
13 April 2005
South Africa	17
England	12
13 April 2005
New Zealand	25
Australia	25

Final
17 April 2005
South Africa	20
New Zealand	15
Third place
17 April 2005
England	21
Australia	29

13 April 2005
15:00

South Africa	17–12	England

Woodburn Stadium, Pietermaritzburg

13 April 2005
13:00

New Zealand	25–25	Australia

Woodburn Stadium, Pietermaritzburg

17 April 2005
16:30

South Africa	20–15	New Zealand

ABSA Stadium, Durban

17 April 2005
14:30

England	21–29	Australia

ABSA Stadium, Durban

== Division B ==
=== Groups ===
Group A		Group B		Group C		Group D	
1	Italy	2	Uruguay	3	Chile	4	Namibia
8	United States	7	Western Samoa	6	Russia	5	Tonga
9	Spain	10	South Korea	11	Zimbabwe	12	Paraguay

=== Group phase ===
Pos.	Team	Matches				Points			BP	TOTAL
Pos.	Team	M	W	D	L	+	-	+/-	BP	TOTAL
1.	Western Samoa	3	3	0	0	88	5	+83	3	15
2.	Tonga	3	3	0	0	89	31	+58	2	14
3.	Uruguay	3	2	0	1	108	25	+83	3	11
4.	Italy	3	2	0	1	135	52	+83	2	10
5.	Zimbabwe	3	2	0	1	63	72	-9	1	9
6.	Namibia	3	1	1	1	96	54	+42	2	8
7.	United States	3	1	1	1	62	72	-10	1	7
8.	South Korea	3	1	0	2	71	82	-11	2	6
9.	Russia	3	1	0	2	32	83	-51	1	5
10.	Paraguay	3	1	0	2	30	131	-101	0	4
11.	Spain	3	0	0	3	19	91	-72	0	0
12.	Chile	3	0	0	3	17	112	-95	0	0

1 April 2005
11:00

Namibia	49–5	Spain

Kings Park Stadium 2, Durban

1 April 2005
11:15

Western Samoa	27–0	Zimbabwe

Kings Park Stadium 3, Durban

1 April 2005
11:30

United States	32–15	Paraguay

Kings Park Stadium 10, Durban

1 April 2005
12:45

Italy	15–25	Tonga

Kings Park Stadium 2, Durban

1 April 2005
13:00

Uruguay	41–0	Russia

Kings Park Stadium 3, Durban

1 April 2005
13:15

Chile	12–39	South Korea

Kings Park Stadium 10, Durban

5 April 2005
11:45

South Korea	15–32	Russia

University of KwaZulu-Natal, Durban

5 April 2005
12:00

Italy	91–0	Paraguay

Durban High School, Durban

5 April 2005
12:00

Spain	6–25	Tonga

Glenwood High School, Durban

5 April 2005
13:45

Namibia	20–20	United States

Glenwood High School, Durban

5 April 2005
13:45

Western Samoa	36–5	Chile

Durban High School, Durban

5 April 2005
13:45

Zimbabwe	25–23	Uruguay

University of KwaZulu-Natal, Durban

9 April 2005
12:00

United States	10–39	Tonga

Durban High School, Durban

9 April 2005
12:00

South Korea	22–36	Zimbabwe

Glenwood High School, Durban

9 April 2005
12:00

Uruguay	42–0	Chile

Woodburn Stadium, Pietermaritzburg

9 April 2005
13:45

Western Samoa	27–0	Russia

Glenwood High School, Durban

9 April 2005
13:45

Italy	29–27	Namibia

Woodburn Stadium, Pietermaritzburg

9 April 2005
13:45

Spain	8–17	Paraguay

Durban High School, Durban

=== Knock out phase ===
==== 9th-place play-off ====
Semi-finals
13 April 2005
Russia	15
Chile	14
13 April 2005
Paraguay	17
Spain	19

Final
17 April 2005
Russia	38
Spain	0
Third place
17 April 2005
Chile	38
Paraguay	22

13 April 2005
12:00

Russia	15–14	Chile

University of KwaZulu-Natal, Durban

13 April 2005
12:00

Paraguay	17–19	Spain

Glenwood High School, Durban

17 April 2005
13:15

Russia	38–0	Spain

Kings Park Stadium 2, Durban

17 April 2005
11:30

Chile	38–22	Paraguay

ABSA Stadium, Durban

==== 5th-place play-off ====
Semi-finals
13 April 2005
Zimbabwe	17
South Korea	25
13 April 2005
Namibia	17
United States	19

Final
17 April 2005
South Korea	22
United States	22
Third place
17 April 2005
Zimbabwe	21
Namibia	33

13 April 2005
13:45

Zimbabwe	17–25	South Korea

University of KwaZulu-Natal, Durban

13 April 2005
12:00

Namibia	17–19	United States

Durban High School, Durban

17 April 2005
13:00

South Korea	22–22	United States

Kings Park Stadium 3, Durban

17 April 2005
11:15

Zimbabwe	21–33	Namibia

Kings Park Stadium 3, Durban

==== 1st-place play-off ====
Semi-finals
13 April 2005
Western Samoa	24
Italy	22
13 April 2005
Tonga	12
Uruguay	19

Final
17 April 2005
Western Samoa	36
Uruguay	17
Third place
17 April 2005
Italy	34
Tonga	17

13 April 2005
13:45

Western Samoa	24–22	Italy

Glenwood High School, Durban

13 April 2005
13:45

Tonga	12–19	Uruguay

Durban High School, Durban

17 April 2005
12:30

Western Samoa	36–17	Uruguay

ABSA Stadium, Durban

17 April 2005
11:00

Italy	34–17	Tonga

Kings Park Stadium 10, Durban

== Final standings ==
Division A	Pos	Division B
South Africa	1	Western Samoa *
New Zealand	2	Uruguay
Australia	3	Italy
England	4	Tonga
France	5	South Korea
Wales	6	United States
Romania	7	Namibia #
Argentina	8	Zimbabwe #
Ireland	9	Russia #
Scotland	10	Spain #
Japan	11	Chile #
Georgia *	12	Paraguay #

* Georgia was demoted to Division B and Samoa promoted to Division A for next World Championship.

# Namibia, Zimbabwe, Russia, Spain, Chile, and Paraguay were relegated from Division B and had to enter regional competitions to qualify for next World Championship.

== Sources ==
- Official site
