= 2026 U20 Barthés Trophy =

Tournament details
- Host: Uganda
- Venue: Mutesa II Stadium
- Date: 7–11 August
- Countries: Kenya; Namibia; Uganda; Tunisia; Zambia; Zimbabwe

The 2026 U20 Barthés Trophy was the 2026 edition of the U20 Barthés Trophy, a rugby union competition for African U20 teams. The tournament was held from 7 to 15 August 2026 in Mutesa II Stadium in Kampala, Uganda.

== Teams ==
The U20 Barthés Trophy title begins in Kampala with the new Division One and Performance Division format.

=== Division One ===
- Uganda
- Zambia

=== Performance Division ===
- Kenya
- Namibia
- Tunisia
- Zimbabwe

== Division One ==
Division One
Tournament details
- Host: Uganda

Final positions
- Champions: Uganda
- Runner-up: Zambia

All matches are East Africa Time (UTC+3:00)

7 August 2026
16:00

Zambia	0–81	Uganda
	Report

11 August 2026
14:00

Uganda	27–12	Zambia
	Report

== Performance Division ==
Performance Division
Tournament details
- Host: Uganda
- Venue: Mutesa II Stadium

Final positions
- Champions: Kenya (4th title)
- Runner-up: Namibia
- Third place: Zimbabwe
- Fourth place: Tunisia

Tournament statistics
- Matches played: 4

All matches are East Africa Time (UTC+3:00)

Semi-finals
7 August
Namibia	11
Tunisia	6
7 August
Kenya	35
Zimbabwe	23

Final
11 August
Namibia	17
Kenya	33
Third place
11 August
Tunisia	12
Zimbabwe	38

7 August 2026
10:00

Namibia	11–6	Tunisia
	Report

7 August 2026
13:00

Kenya	35–23	Zimbabwe
	Report

=== Third place match ===
11 August 2026
12:00

Tunisia	12–38	Zimbabwe
	Report

=== Final ===
11 August 2026
16:00

Namibia	17–33	Kenya
	Report
