= 2009 IRB Junior World Rugby Trophy =

Tournament details
- Host nation: Kenya
- Dates: April 21st, 2009 – May 3rd, 2009
- No. of nations: 8

Final positions
- Champions: Romania
- Runner-up: United States

Tournament statistics
- Matches played: 16
- Top scorer(s): (Romania) Stefan Patrascu (61)

The 2009 IRB Junior World Rugby Trophy was the second IRB Junior World Rugby Trophy, the second-tier world rugby union championship for Under-20 national teams. The event is organised by rugby's governing body, the International Rugby Board (IRB). This competition, which is contested by eight men's junior national teams, was held in Nairobi, Kenya from April 21 to May 3.

The competition was won by Romania. Original plans called for them to receive an automatic berth into the following year's edition of the IRB Junior World Championship, the top tier of the IRB under-20 championship; however, Romania ultimately did not receive that berth after the Junior World Championship was reduced from 16 teams to 12.

== Venues ==
| City | Ground | Capacity |
|---|---|---|
| Nairobi | RFUEA Ground | 6000 |
| Nairobi | Impala Ground | |

== Pools ==
=== Pool A ===
| Team | Pld | W | D | L | TF | PF | PA | +/- | BP | Pts |
|---|---|---|---|---|---|---|---|---|---|---|
| United States | 3 | 2 | 0 | 1 | 18 | 125 | 72 | +53 | 4 | 12 |
| Kenya | 3 | 2 | 0 | 1 | 18 | 117 | 54 | +63 | 3 | 11 |
| Namibia | 3 | 2 | 0 | 1 | 18 | 150 | 53 | +97 | 2 | 10 |
| Cayman Islands | 3 | 0 | 0 | 3 | 1 | 22 | 235 | −213 | 0 | 0 |

All match times are East Africa Time (UTC+3).

April 21st, 2009
2:00pm

| Cayman Islands | 15 – 64 | United States |

Impala Ground, Nairobi

April 21st, 2009
4:15pm

| Kenya | 17 – 22 | Namibia |

RFUEA Ground, Nairobi

April 25th, 2009
11:30am

| Cayman Islands | 7 – 104 | Namibia |

Impala Ground, Nairobi

April 25th, 2009
1:30pm

| United States | 32 – 33 | Kenya |

RFUEA Ground, Nairobi

April 29th, 2009
12:00pm

| Kenya | 67 – 0 | Cayman Islands |

RFUEA Ground, Nairobi

April 29th, 2009
2:00pm

| Namibia | 24 – 29 | United States |

RFUEA Ground, Nairobi

=== Pool B ===
| Team | Pld | W | D | L | TF | PF | PA | +/- | BP | Pts |
|---|---|---|---|---|---|---|---|---|---|---|
| Romania | 3 | 3 | 0 | 0 | 21 | 141 | 51 | +90 | 2 | 14 |
| Chile | 3 | 2 | 0 | 1 | 17 | 119 | 69 | +50 | 3 | 11 |
| Papua New Guinea | 3 | 1 | 0 | 2 | 82 | 119 | 12 | −37 | 1 | 5 |
| South Korea | 3 | 0 | 0 | 3 | 7 | 54 | 157 | −103 | 0 | 0 |

All match times are East Africa Time (UTC+3).

April 21st, 2009
12:00pm

| Papua New Guinea | 17 – 50 | Romania |

Impala Ground, Nairobi

April 21st, 2009
2:00pm

| Chile | 49 – 21 | South Korea |

RFUEA Ground, Nairobi

April 25th, 2009
11:30am

| Chile | 50 – 22 | Papua New Guinea |

RFUEA Ground, Nairobi

April 25th, 2009
1:30pm

| South Korea | 14 – 65 | Romania |

RFUEA Ground, Nairobi

April 29th, 2009
12:00pm

| Papua New Guinea | 48 – 19 | South Korea |

Impala Ground, Nairobi

April 29th, 2009
4:15pm

| Romania | 26 – 20 | Chile |

RFUEA Ground, Nairobi

== Playoffs ==
All match times are East Africa Time (UTC+3).

=== 7th place ===
May 3rd, 2009
11:30am

| Cayman Islands | 12 – 62 | South Korea |

Impala Ground, Nairobi

=== 5th place ===
May 3rd, 2009
11:30am

| Namibia | 48 – 43 | Papua New Guinea |

RFUEA Ground, Nairobi

=== 3rd place ===
May 3rd, 2009
1:30pm

| Kenya | 17 – 19 | Chile |

RFUEA Ground, Nairobi

=== Final ===
May 3rd, 2009
3:30pm

| United States | 13 – 25 | Romania |

RFUEA Ground, Nairobi

== See also ==
- 2009 IRB Junior World Championship
