= 2025 U20 Barthés Trophy =

Tournament details
- Host: Zimbabwe
- Venue: Old Hararians Sports Club
- Date: 15–27 April
- Countries: Kenya; Namibia; Tunisia; Zimbabwe

Final positions
- Champions: Namibia
- Runner-up: Kenya
- Third place: Zimbabwe

Tournament statistics
- Matches played: 6

The 2025 U20 Barthés Trophy will be the 2025 edition of the U20 Barthés Trophy, a rugby union competition for African U20 teams. The tournament was held from 15 to 27 April 2027 in Old Hararians Sports Club in Harare, Zimbabwe.

== Fixtures ==
Pos	Team	Pld	W	D	L	PF	PA	PD	TF	TA	TB	LB	Pts	Qualification
1	Namibia	3	3	0	0	154	51	+103	0	0	0	0	12	Advance to 2026 World Rugby U20 Challenger Cup
2	Kenya	3	2	0	1	72	73	−1	0	0	0	0	8	
3	Zimbabwe (H)	3	1	0	2	120	82	+38	0	0	0	0	4	
4	Tunisia	3	0	0	3	48	188	−140	0	0	0	0	0	

Updated to match(es) played on unknown. Source:
(H) Host

19 April 2025
12:00

Kenya	29–21	Tunisia
	Report

19 April 2025
15:00

Zimbabwe	22–41	Namibia
	Report

23 April 2025
12:00

Kenya	22–32	Namibia
	Report

23 April 2025
15:00

Zimbabwe	78–20	Tunisia
	Report

27 April 2025
10:00

Namibia	81–7	Tunisia
	Report

27 April 2025
15:00

Kenya	21–20	Zimbabwe
	Report
