= 2017 World Rugby Under 20 Trophy =

Tournament details
- Host: Uruguay
- Date: 29 August – 10 September 2017
- Teams: 8

Final positions
- Champions: Japan
- Runner-up: Portugal
- Third place: Uruguay

Tournament statistics
- Matches played: 16
- Top scorer(s): (Uruguay) Alejo Piazza (40)
- Most tries: (Japan) Faulua Makisi (6)

The 2017 World Rugby U20 Trophy was the tenth annual international rugby union competition for Under 20 national teams, second-tier world championship.

The event was held at the Estadio Charrúa in Montevideo and Estadio Domingo Burgueño in Maldonado, Uruguay from 29 August until 10 September and was organized by rugby's governing body, World Rugby.

== Qualified teams ==
A total of 8 teams played in the tournament. The host (Uruguay) and the Junior World Cup relegation country (Japan) qualified automatically. The remaining six countries competed through a qualification process in regional competitions (North America, South America, Europe, Africa, Asia, Oceania).

Host (1)

- Uruguay

Relegated from 2016 JWC

- Japan

Asia Rugby (1)

- Hong Kong

Rugby Africa (1)

- Namibia

Sudamérica Rugby (1)

- Chile

Rugby Americas North (1)

- Canada

Rugby Europe (1)

- Portugal

Oceania Rugby (1)

- Fiji

== Pool Stage ==
=== Pool A ===
| Team | Pld | W | D | L | PF | PA | PD | TF | TA | Pts |
|---|---|---|---|---|---|---|---|---|---|---|
| Japan | 3 | 3 | 0 | 0 | 111 | 47 | +64 | 11 | 7 | 14 |
| Namibia | 3 | 2 | 0 | 1 | 77 | 68 | +9 | 10 | 5 | 10 |
| Chile | 3 | 1 | 0 | 2 | 86 | 89 | -3 | 8 | 8 | 7 |
| Canada | 3 | 0 | 0 | 3 | 56 | 126 | -70 | 4 | 13 | 1 |

29 August 2017
10:00

| Namibia | 31–16 | Canada |

Estadio Charrúa

29 August 2017
14:00

| Japan | 28–22 | Chile |

Estadio Charrúa

2 September 2017
12:00

| Namibia | 33–19 | Chile |

Estadio Charrúa

2 September 2017
14:00

| Japan | 50–12 | Canada |

Estadio Charrúa

6 September 2017
11:30

| Canada | 28–45 | Chile |

Estadio Domingo Burgueño

6 September 2017
17:30

| Japan | 33–13 | Namibia |

Estadio Domingo Burgueño

=== Pool B ===
| Team | Pld | W | D | L | PF | PA | PD | TF | TA | Pts |
|---|---|---|---|---|---|---|---|---|---|---|
| Portugal | 3 | 3 | 0 | 0 | 67 | 55 | +12 | 6 | 5 | 12 |
| Uruguay | 3 | 2 | 0 | 1 | 118 | 33 | +85 | 7 | 3 | 11 |
| Fiji | 3 | 1 | 0 | 2 | 42 | 57 | -15 | 4 | 6 | 6 |
| Hong Kong | 3 | 0 | 0 | 3 | 41 | 123 | -82 | 4 | 7 | 1 |

29 August 2017
12:00

| Portugal | 20–18 | Uruguay |

Estadio Charrúa

29 August 2017
16:00

| Fiji | 26–7 | Hong Kong |

Estadio Charrúa

2 September 2017
10:00

| Portugal | 31–24 | Hong Kong |

Estadio Charrúa

2 September 2017
16:00

| Fiji | 3–34 | Uruguay |

Estadio Charrúa

6 September 2017
13:30

| Uruguay | 66–10 | Hong Kong |

Estadio Domingo Burgueño

6 September 2017
15:30

| Fiji | 13–16 | Portugal |

Estadio Domingo Burgueño

== Finals ==
7th place

10 September 2017

| Canada | 38–0 | Hong Kong |

Estadio Charrúa

5th place

10 September 2017

| Chile | 15–13 | Fiji |

Estadio Charrúa

3rd place

10 September 2017

| Namibia | 12–34 | Uruguay |

Estadio Charrúa

Final

10 September 2017

| Japan | 14-3 | Portugal |

Estadio Charrúa
