= Edgar Marutlulle =

South African rugby union player

- Full name: Edgar Marutlulle
- Born: 20 December 1987 (age 38) Boksburg, South Africa
- Height: 1.74 m (5 ft 8 1/2 in)
- Weight: 100 kg (220 lb; 15 st 10 lb)
- School: Potchefstroom High School for Boys
- University: North-West University

Rugby union career
- Position: Hooker
Youth career
- 2003–2008: Leopards
Amateur team(s)
Years	Team	Apps	(Points)
2009–2010	UJ	14	(25)
Senior career
Years	Team	Apps	(Points)
2010	Golden Lions	13	(5)
2011–2012	Golden Lions XV	11	(15)
2011	Lions	8	(0)
2012–2013	Leopards	26	(50)
2013–2014	Leopards XV	8	(0)
2013	Southern Kings	4	(0)
2014–2015	Eastern Province Kings	23	(0)
2016	Southern Kings	13	(20)
2016–2018	Blue Bulls	15	(15)
2017–2018	Bulls	8	(0)
2017–2018	Blue Bulls XV	9	(5)
- Correct as of 27 October 2018
International career
Years	Team	Apps	(Points)
2004–2005	South Africa Schools		
2006	South Africa Under-19		
2007–2009	South Africa Students	4	(0)
2016	South Africa 'A'	1	(0)
- Correct as of 11 April 2018

Edgar Marutlulle (born 20 December 1987) is a South African rugby union player for the Bulls in Super Rugby and the Blue Bulls XV in the Rugby Challenge. His usual position is hooker.

== Career ==
=== Youth ===
He went to Potchefstroom High School for Boys and therefore represented Leopards youth level. He was included in their Under-18 Craven Week sides in both 2004 and 2005. In 2004, he was also included in a South African Schools team that played against their South African Academy counterparts. In 2005, he also represented the Leopards U19 side in the 2005 Under-19 Provincial Championship.

The following year, he was included in the South African Under-19 squad that competed at the 2006 Under 19 Rugby World Championship in the United Arab Emirates, finishing eighth in the competition. He once again played at Under-19 level for the Leopards in the Provincial Championship in 2006 and progressed to the Under-21 side in 2007 and 2008. He was included in the Leopards' senior squad for the 2008 Vodacom Cup competition, but failed to make an appearance. He also represented a South African Students side that played against Namibia.

=== UJ / Golden Lions ===
In 2009, Marutlulle moved to Johannesburg, where he joined university side UJ for the 2009 Varsity Cup season. He made seven appearances for the side as they narrowly missed out on a semi-final spot. However, he was once again included in the South African Students squad that faced their American counterparts in matches in Stellenbosch and Cape Town.

He was again a key player for UJ in the 2010 Varsity Cup competition, starting all seven matches for the side during their campaign and scoring five tries, which included two in their match against the NMMU Madibaz, but could once again not help UJ into the semi-finals.

However, Johannesburg-based union Golden Lions included him in their squad for the 2010 Currie Cup Premier Division and he made his first team debut against the Western Province in Cape Town. He played thirteen matches during the season – mainly being used off the bench, but he did start matches against the Free State Cheetahs and the Pumas – and Marutlulle also scored his first senior try in their return match against the Free State Cheetahs in Bloemfontein.

In 2011, he made the step up to Super Rugby level when he was included in the Lions squad for the 2011 Super Rugby season. He made his debut playing off the bench against the Bulls, but was behind Bandise Maku in the pecking order and made just one start during the season in their match against the Cheetahs, coming on as a substitute on seven occasions. He was also utilised in the 2011 Vodacom Cup during this time, starting six matches and scoring three tries, which included a brace against the Border Bulldogs.

=== Return to Leopards ===
However, he rejoined the Leopards prior to the 2012 Currie Cup First Division season on a two-year deal. He established himself as the first-choice hooker right away, starting 11 of their 15 matches during the season and made a further two appearances off the bench. He scored four tries – both home and away to the Boland Cavaliers and home and away to the Eastern Province Kings, the latter fixture being the semi-final, which the Leopards lost 50–27.

He was included in the Southern Kings squad for the 2013 Super Rugby season. He made four appearances from the bench in the first four games of the season, but lost his place when first Hannes Franklin and then Virgile Lacombe were preferred to him. He returned to the Leopards and represented them in their final game of the 2013 Vodacom Cup season. He again made thirteen appearances during the Leopards' 2013 Currie Cup First Division campaign. This time, he scored a total of six tries to finish as the Leopards' top try-scoring forward during the season, once again helping them to the semi-finals of the competition, where they lost to the Eastern Province Kings for the second year in a row, with the fixture this time requiring extra time to differentiate the sides, with the Kings eventually running out 32–29 winners.

Again, first-choice hooker during the 2014 Vodacom Cup competition, Marutlulle made seven starts as they finished fifth in the Northern Section. He was released from his contract after the 2014 Vodacom Cup campaign to return to Port Elizabeth to join the Eastern Province Kings, having made a total of 34 appearances for the Leopards, scoring ten tries.

=== Eastern Province Kings ===
He signed a deal with the Eastern Province Kings in a deal until the end of 2015. In June 2014, he was selected in the starting line-up for the Eastern Province Kings side to face Wales during a tour match during a 2014 incoming tour. He played for the first 72 minutes of the match as the Kings suffered a 12–34 defeat. He played in seven matches of the Kings' Currie Cup season as they returned to the Premier Division of the competition in 2014; he started the first six matches of the season before sustaining a shoulder injury that ruled him out for the next three weeks. He returned to the side for their final match of the season and appeared as a second-half substitute to help his side beat the Pumas 26–25 to secure their only win of the season.

=== South Africa 'A' ===
In 2016, Marutlulle was included in a South Africa 'A' squad that played a two-match series against a touring England Saxons team. He didn't play in their first match in Bloemfontein, but was named on their bench for the second match of the series in George, and came on in the second half of a 26–29 defeat.

=== Blue Bulls ===
After the 2016 Super Rugby season, Marutlulle moved back north, joining the Pretoria-based Blue Bulls on a three-year deal.
