= 2013 IRB Junior World Rugby Trophy =

Tournament details
- Host: Chile
- Date: 28 May – 9 June 2013
- Teams: 8

Final positions
- Champions: Italy
- Runner-up: Canada
- Third place: Chile

Tournament statistics
- Matches played: 16
- Top scorer(s): (Canada) Shane O'Leary (45)
- Most tries: (Japan) Kai Ishii (8)

The 2013 IRB Junior World Rugby Trophy was the sixth IRB Junior World Rugby Trophy, an annual international rugby union competition for under-20 national teams, second-tier world championship.

The event was held in Temuco, Chile and was organized by rugby's governing body, the International Rugby Board. The tournament was originally to be held in Antofagasta, but that city pulled out of hosting only a few months before the tournament.

== Teams ==
Pool	Team	Number of Tournaments	Position Last Year	
B	Canada	3	6	
A	Chile	2	5	
A	Italy	1	Relegated from 2012 IRB Junior World Championship	Won the Trophy in 2010
B	Japan	3	2	
A	Namibia	2	N/A	
A	Portugal	0	N/A	
B	Tonga	1	3	
B	Uruguay	3	N/A	Won the Trophy in 2008

== Pool Stage ==
=== Pool A ===
Team	Pld	W	D	L	TF	PF	PA	PD	BP	Pts
Italy	3	3	0	0	21	144	26	118	3	15
Chile	3	2	0	1	4	47	77	-30	0	8
Portugal	3	1	0	2	5	45	96	-51	0	4
Namibia	3	0	0	3	7	45	82	-37	1	1

=== Fixtures ===
28 May 2013
13:00

Italy	33-7	Namibia

Estadio Municipal de Freire, Freire

28 May 2013
18:00

Chile	18-6	Portugal

Estadio Municipal Germán Becker, Temuco

1 June 2013
13:00

Portugal	26-17	Namibia

Universidad de La Frontera, Temuco

1 June 2013
18:00

Chile	6-50	Italy

Estadio Municipal Germán Becker, Temuco

5 June 2013
11:00

Italy	61-13	Portugal

Estadio Municipal de Freire, Freire

5 June 2013
13:00

Chile	23 - 21	Namibia

Estadio Municipal de Freire, Freire

=== Pool B ===
Team	Pld	W	D	L	TF	PF	PA	PD	BP	Pts
Canada	3	3	0	0	12	99	36	63	2	14
Japan	3	2	0	1	16	98	91	7	2	10
Tonga	3	1	0	2	9	63	87	-24	1	6
Uruguay	3	0	0	3	7	55	111	-56	0	0

=== Fixtures ===
28 May 2013
11:00

Japan	40 - 20	Uruguay

Estadio Municipal de Freire, Freire

28 May 2013
16:00

Tonga	6 - 24	Canada

Estadio Municipal Germán Becker, Temuco

1 June 2013
11:00

Japan	15 - 39	Canada

Universidad de la Frontera, Temuco

1 June 2013
16:00

Tonga	35 - 20	Uruguay

Estadio Municipal Germán Becker, Temuco

5 June 2013
13:00

Canada	36 - 15	Uruguay

Estadio Municipal de Pitrufquén, Pitrufquén

5 June 2013
11:00

Japan	43 - 22	Tonga

Estadio Municipal de Pitrufquén, Pitrufquén

== Knockout stage ==
=== 7th place game ===
9 June 2013
11:00

Namibia	29 - 40	Uruguay

Universidad de La Frontera, Temuco

=== 5th place game ===
9 June 2013
13:00

Portugal	7 - 27	Tonga

Universidad de La Frontera, Temuco

=== Third place game ===
9 June 2013
15:00

Chile	38 - 35	Japan

Estadio Municipal Germán Becker, Temuco

=== Final ===
9 June 2013
17:00

Italy	45 - 23	Canada

Estadio Municipal Germán Becker, Temuco
