= Australia national under-19 rugby union team =

Australia U-19
- Union: Australian Rugby Union
Team kit

First international
- Australia 62–12 Japan (27 March 2004)

Largest win
- Australia 88–9 Romania (9 April 2006)

Largest defeat
- Australia 5–30 New Zealand (4 April 2004)

World Cup
- Appearances: 4 (First in 2004)
- Best result: Champions, 2006

The Australian national under-19 rugby union team formerly represented Australia on a national level in age graded rugby union. The team competed in all four editions of the Under 19 Rugby World Championship, winning the title in 2006, and finishing third in 2005 and 2007.

Starting in 2008, the International Rugby Board scrapped its under-21 and under-19 world championships in favour of a single under-20 competition, the IRB Junior World Championship. Australia accordingly replaced its under-21 and under-19 sides with a new under-20 side.

== Record ==
Under 19 World Championship
Year	Round	Position	Pld	W	L	D
(South Africa) 2004	Fifth play-off	6	5	2	3	0
(South Africa) 2005	Third play-off	3rd place, bronze medalist(s)	5	4	0	1
(United Arab Emirates) 2006	Champions	1st place, gold medalist(s)	5	4	1	0
(Ireland) 2007	Third play-off	3rd place, bronze medalist(s)	5	4	1	0
Total	1 Title	4/4	20	14	5	1

== Results 2004 to 2007 ==
2007 Under 19 World Championship – (3rd place)

Match	Score	Opposition
Pool match	15–10	Ireland
Pool match	23–12	Fiji
Pool match	30–11	France
Semi-final	18–32	South Africa
3rd place play-off	25–21	Wales

2006 Under 19 World Championship – (1st place)

Match	Score	Opposition
Pool match	78–3	Scotland
Pool match	88–9	Romania
Pool match	17–22	New Zealand
Semi-final	26–16	France
Final	17–13	New Zealand

2005 Under 19 World Championship – (3rd place)

Match	Score	Opposition
Pool match	10–6	France
Pool match	38–0	Argentina
Pool match	23–0	Ireland
Semi-final	25–25	New Zealand
3rd place play-off	29–21	England

2004 Under 19 World Championship – (6th place)

Match	Score	Opposition
Pool match	62–12	Japan
Pool match	23–33	England
Pool match	5–30	New Zealand
Play-off	66–19	Japan
5th place play-off	10–14	Wales

== See also ==
- Australia national under-20 rugby union team
- Australia national under-21 rugby union team
