= 2019 U20 Barthés Trophy =

- Countries: Kenya
- Number of teams: 11
- Champions: Kenya
- Runners-up: Namibia
- Matches played: 11

The 2019 U20 Barthés Trophy was the 2019 edition of the U20 Barthés Trophy, a hosted by Kenya from 4 April–12 May. Kenya won the tournament after beating Namibia 21–18, they also qualified for the 2019 World Rugby Under 20 Trophy that was held in Brazil.

== Format ==
The winner was determined by the results of the finals. The winner of Pool B will be promoted to Pool A and the winner of Pool C will be promoted to Pool B in 2020. The winner of Pool A, Kenya, participated in the 2019 Junior World Cup Trophy.

The last group in Pool A will be relegated to Group B, the last group in Group B will be relegated to Pool C and the last class in Group C will be replaced by a new team in 2020.

The ranking and points system for Pool A and B was as follows: The winner of the final of each group was ranked 1st; the loser of the final was ranked 2nd; the winner of the second final was ranked 3rd and the loser of the second final was ranked 4th.

Pool C's ranking and points system differed from Pools A and B. 4 points was awarded for a win + 1 offensive bonus point if the team scores 3 or more tries difference. A draw was 2 points; 0 points for a loss, or 1 point in the case of a defensive bonus if the team loses by 7 points or less.

== Results ==
=== Pool A ===
Team	P	W	D	L	PF	PA	PD
Kenya	2	2	0	0	94	18	76
Namibia	2	1	0	1	63	33	30
Senegal	2	1	0	1	40	61	-21
Tunisia	2	0	0	2	16	101	-85

4 April
3:30 PM EAT (UTC+03:00)

Kenya	73–0	Tunisia
	Report

KCB Sports Club, Ruaraka
Attendance: 500
Referee: (Namibia) Nicardo Pinennar

4 April
1:30 PM EAT (UTC+03:00)

Namibia	45–12	Senegal
	Report

KCB Sports Club, Ruaraka
Attendance: 500
Referee: (Morocco) Youness Marfoq

7 April
4:00 PM EAT (UTC+03:00)

Namibia	18–21	Kenya
	Report

KCB Sports Club, Ruaraka
Attendance: 1,500
Referee: (Zimbabwe) Precious Pazani

7 April
2:00 PM EAT (UTC+03:00)

Senegal	28–16	Tunisia
	Report

KCB Sports Club, Ruaraka
Attendance: 800
Referee: (Ivory Coast) Ignace Ndrikhan

=== Pool B ===
Team	P	W	D	L	PF	PA	PD
Madagascar	2	2	0	0	92	25	67
Zimbabwe	2	1	0	1	51	37	14
Ivory Coast	2	1	0	1	48	32	16
Morocco	2	0	0	2	6	103	-97

17 April
3:30 PM EAT (UTC+03:00)

Morocco	0–65	Madagascar
	Report

Prince Edward School, Harare, Zimbabwe
Referee: (Tunisia) Aymen Jriri

17 April
1:30 PM EAT (UTC+03:00)

Zimbabwe	26–10	Ivory Coast
	Report

Prince Edward School, Harare, Zimbabwe
Referee: (Namibia) Zaid Isaacs

20 April
12:00 PM EAT (UTC+03:00)

Zimbabwe	25–27	Madagascar
	Report

Prince Edward School, Harare, Zimbabwe
Referee: (Tunisia) Heykel Bahroun

20 April
10:00 AM EAT (UTC+03:00)

Ivory Coast	38–6	Morocco
	Report

Prince Edward School, Harare, Zimbabwe
Referee: Victor Oduor

=== Pool C ===
Team	P	W	D	L	PF	PA	PD	P
Zambia	2	2	0	0	69	15	54	9
Uganda	2	1	0	1	64	14	50	6
Ghana	2	0	0	2	3	107	-104	0

7 May
5:00 PM EAT (UTC+03:00)

Ghana	3–55	Zambia
	Report

Kyadondo Rugby Club, Kampala, Uganda
Referee: (Namibia) Nicardo Pinennar

10 May
5:00 PM EAT (UTC+03:00)

Uganda	52–0	Ghana
	Report

Kyadondo Rugby Club, Kampala, Uganda
Referee: (Madagascar) Stéphane Rakotonirainy

12 May
2:00 PM EAT (UTC+03:00)

Zambia	14–12	Uganda
	Report

Kyadondo Rugby Club, Kampala, Uganda
Referee: (Zimbabwe) Talent Gandiwa

== Final standings ==
Rank	Team
1st place, gold medalist(s)	Kenya
2nd place, silver medalist(s)	Namibia
3rd place, bronze medalist(s)	Senegal
4	Tunisia
5	Madagascar
6	Zimbabwe
7	Ivory Coast
8	Morocco
9	Zambia
10	Uganda
11	Ghana
