= Shahn Eru =

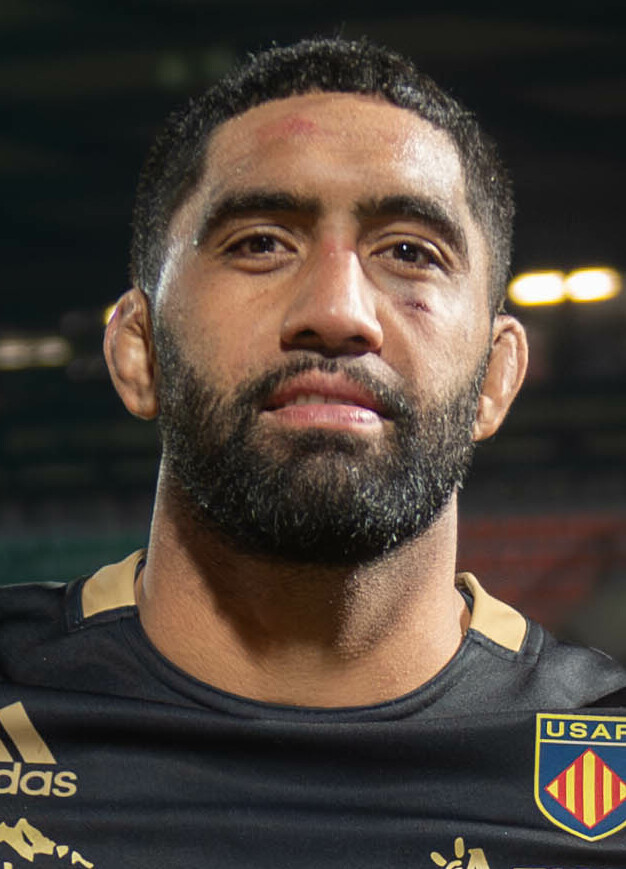
- Born: Shahn Eru; 20 September 1989 (age 37)
- Height: 1.96 m (6 ft 5 in)
- Weight: 111 kg (17 st 7 lb; 245 lb)

Rugby union career
- Position: Second Row
Senior career
Years	Team	Apps	(Points)
20–2014	Wainuiomata RFC	93	
2014–2015	Petrarca Rugby	14	(5)
2015–2017	Bay of Plenty	14	(20)
2017–	USA Perpignan	125	(125)
- Correct as of 10 January 2024
International career
Years	Team	Apps	(Points)
2008	Cook Islands U20	4	(0)
2009	New Zealand U20	3	(5)
2017–2018	Cook Islands	2	(0)
- Correct as of 10 January 2024

Shahn Eru is a Cook Island rugby union player who plays for French Top14 side Perpignan.

== Career ==
Eru featured for both the Cook Islands U20 and the New Zealand U20 sides, winning the 2009 IRB Junior World Championship with New Zealand.

He began his career at Wainuiomata RFC before joining Italian Top10 side Petrarca Rugby.

In 2015 he joined the Bay of Plenty in the NPC before signing for then ProD2 side USA Perpignan where he won the ProD2 title in his first year gaining promotion to the Top14.

In 2018 he was selected for the Cook Islands.

== Honours ==
=== New Zealand U20 ===
- 2009 IRB Junior World Championship

=== USAP ===
- 2017–18 Rugby Pro D2
