= 2007 Under 19 Rugby World Championship =

Tournament details
- Host nation: Ireland
- Dates: 4 April 2007 – 21 April 2007
- No. of nations: 24

Final positions
- Champions: New Zealand
- Runner-up: South Africa
- Third place: Australia

Tournament statistics
- Matches played: 60
- Top scorer(s): Leigh Halfpenny Wales

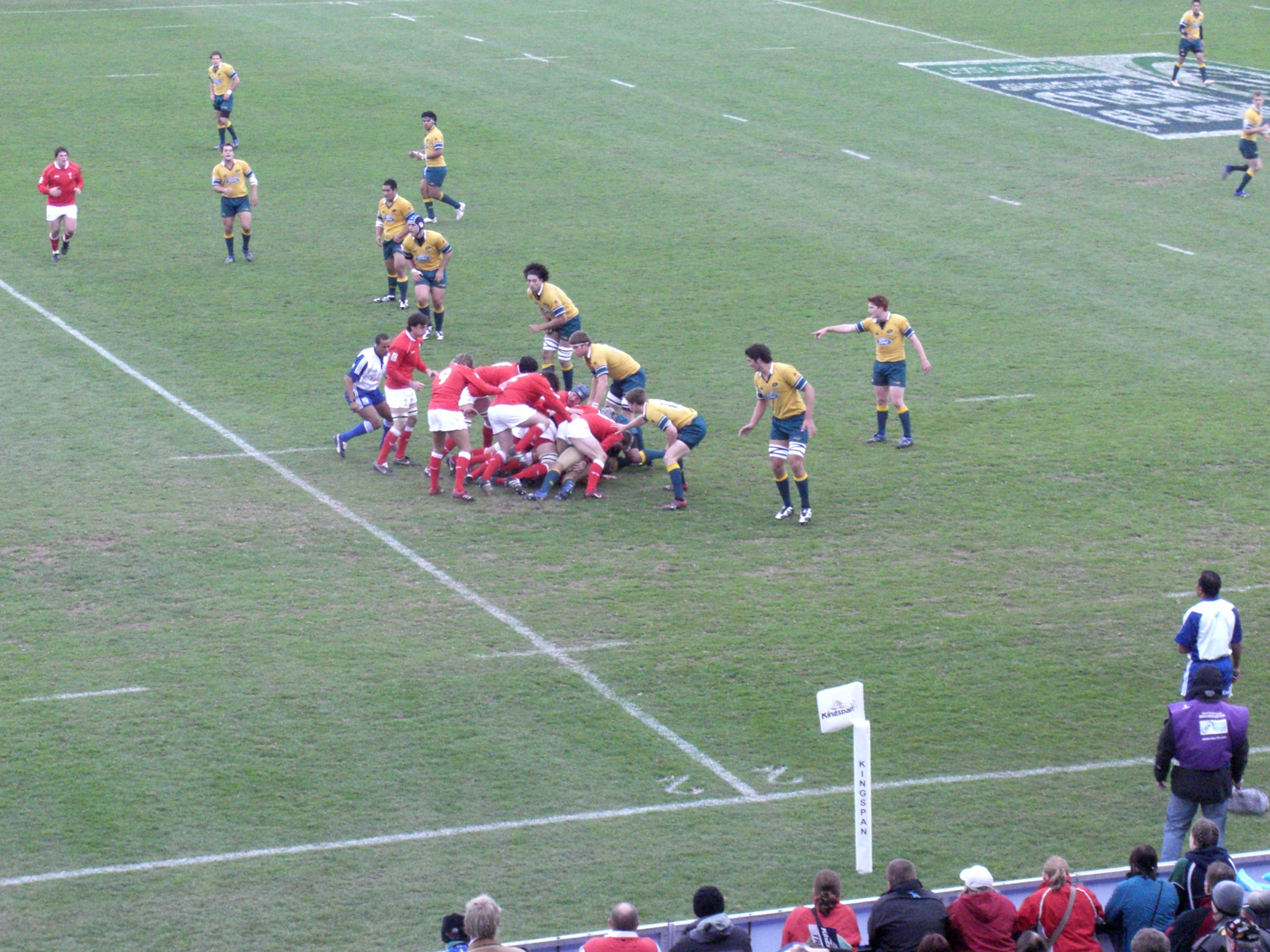
Australia narrowly defeat Wales for third place

The International Rugby Board (IRB) awarded the 2007 Under 19 Rugby World Championship to the Irish Rugby Football Union (IRFU) and the Ulster branch hosted it. The Tournament, which took place in Belfast, Northern Ireland from 4–21 April, was split into two divisions of twelve teams. Division A games took place in Belfast at Belfast Harlequins' Deramore Park, Ulster Rugby's Ravenhill Stadium, and Cooke RFC/Instonians' Shaw's Bridge complex. Division B games were held in Queen's University of Belfast's The Dub complex and Malone RFC's Gibson Park in Belfast, and Bangor RFC's Upritchard Park in Bangor.

Defending champion and top seed Australia began its title defence against Ireland on 5 April as part of a Round One double-header at Ravenhill that also included number three seed New Zealand against France.

The seedings of all teams in Division A and the top six teams in Division B were based on the final standings at the 2006 Tournament. Seeds 7 – 12 inclusive in Division B represented teams who had qualified for 2007 via regional tournaments and their seeding was drawn randomly. All 24 participating teams were confirmed in January 2007.

This was the final Under 19 World Championship. The IRB decided to fold its under-19 and under-21 world championships into a two-tiered under-20 tournament structure starting in 2008. The top tier, the IRB Junior World Championship, will feature 16 teams, while eight teams will compete in the second-tier IRB Junior World Trophy.

== Qualification ==
The following 24 teams, shown by region, qualified for the 2007 Under 19 Rugby World Championship .

- Americas
  - Argentina
  - Canada
  - Chile
  - United States
  - Uruguay
- Asia
  - Chinese Taipei
  - Japan
- Oceania
  - Australia
  - Cook Islands
  - Fiji
  - New Zealand
  - Samoa
  - Tonga
- Africa
  - South Africa
  - Zimbabwe
- Europe
  - England
  - France
  - Georgia
  - Ireland
  - Italy
  - Romania
  - Russia
  - Scotland
  - Wales

== Match officials ==
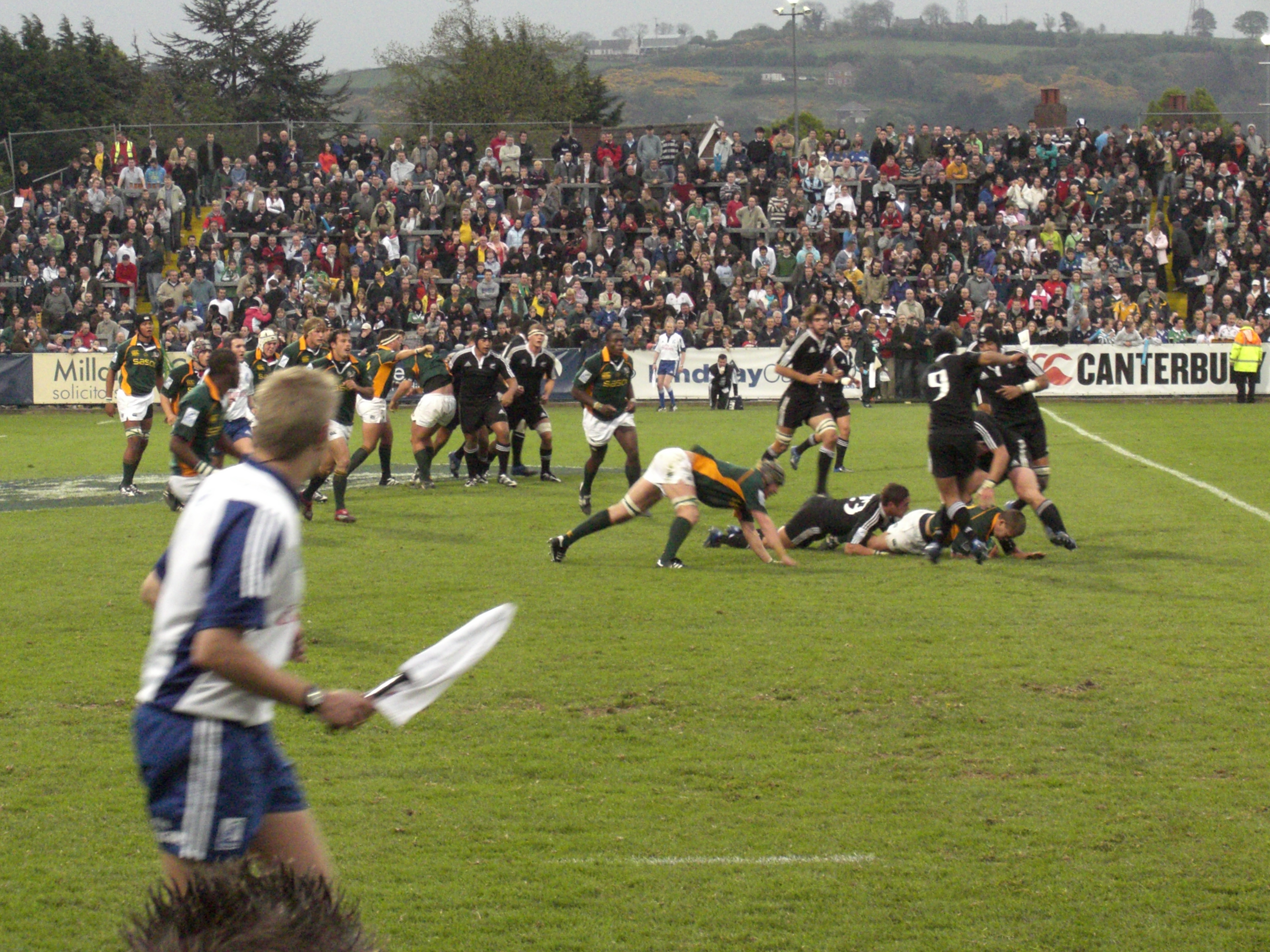
The New Zealand vs South Africa 2007 Under 19 Rugby final at Ravenhill

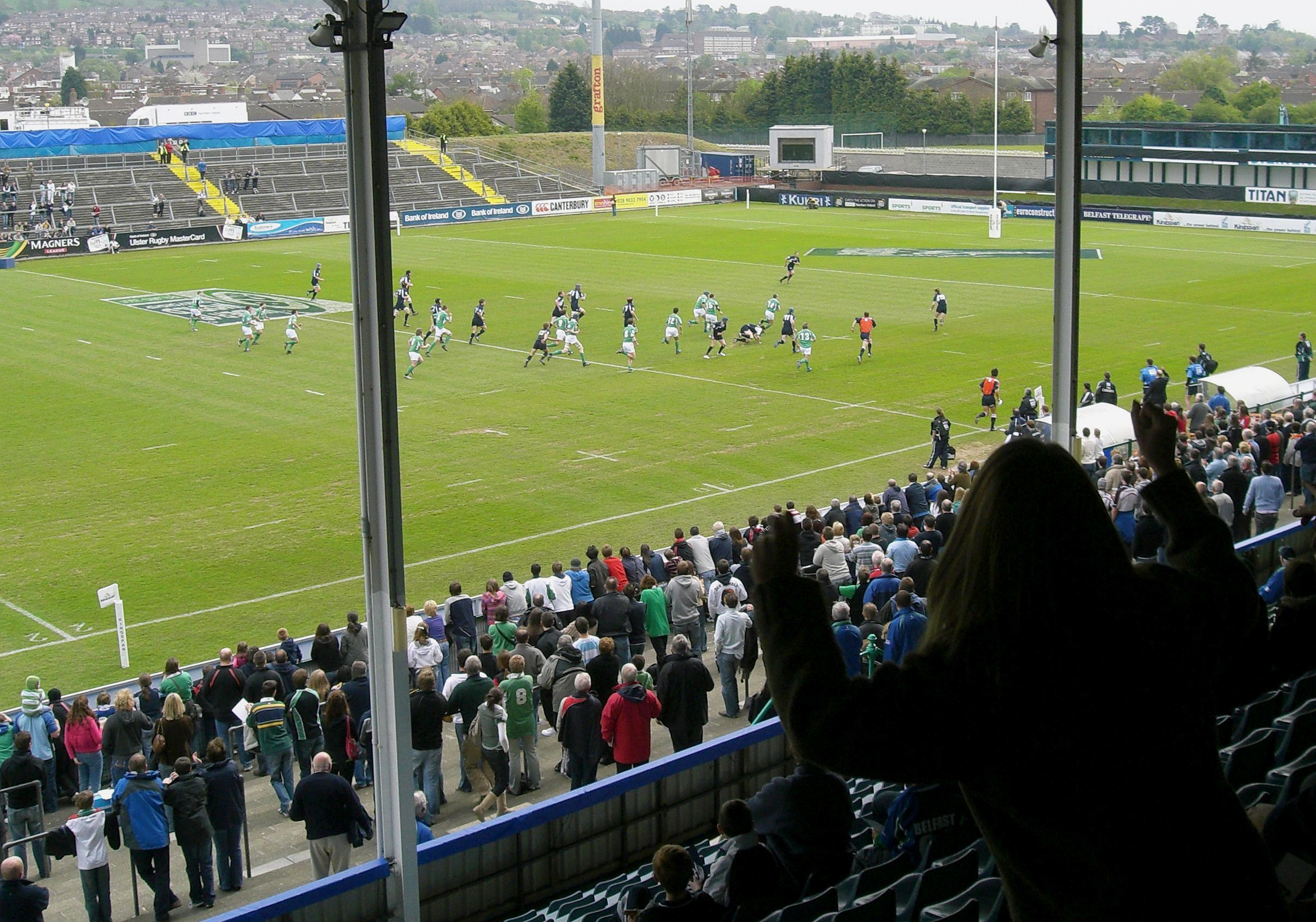
Host nation Ireland beats Scotland 34–0 in the playoff for 9th place

=== Referees ===
These were chosen to Officiate at the 2007 Under 19 Rugby World Championship in Belfast, Northern Ireland from 4–21 April.

- James Bolabiu (Fiji)
- Phillip Bosch (South Africa)
- Sarah Corrigan (Australia)
- Alan Falzone (Italy)
- Jérôme Garcès (France)
- James Jones (Wales)
- David Keane (Ireland)
- Javier Mancuso (Argentina)
- João Mourinha (Portugal)
- Neil Paterson (Scotland)
- Julian Pritchard (Australia)
- Dean Richards (England)
- Phil Smith (Canada)
- Matt Stanish (New Zealand)

=== Touch judge panel ===
- Peter Ferguson (Ireland)
- Richard Kerr (Ireland)
- Kyosuke Toda (Japan)
- Laifaga Unasa (Samoa)

Sarah Corrigan the Australian match official created history when she took charge of the Division B match between Zimbabwe v Canada on 4 April 2007, becoming the first female to referee at an IRB 15-man tournament outside the Women's Rugby World Cup. (The first woman ever to officiate at any IRB tournament outside the Women's Rugby World Cup was American Dana Teagarden, who was referee for six matches at the 2007 USA Sevens, an event in the IRB Sevens World Series held in February 2007.)

== Pool/standings ==
The IRB setting for this tournament was that the matches were to be played between two pools from which the top 8 teams qualified for the Quarter finals and the team that finished at the bottom of the Division A pool was to be relegated to the Division B.

- Pool A played against Pool D
- Pool B played against Pool C

Match points were awarded on the basis of 4 points for a Win, 2 points for a draw and 0 points for a Loss. Bonus points were awarded for teams scoring 4 tries or more and to losing teams who lost be 7 points or less.

=== Division A ===
Pool A

Team	Pld	W	D	L	F	A	BP	TOTAL
Australia	3	3	0	0	68	33	2	14
South Africa	3	2	0	1	75	27	2	10
Scotland	3	0	0	3	41	49	2	2

Pool B

Team	Pld	W	D	L	F	A	BP	TOTAL
New Zealand	3	3	0	0	178	33	3	15
Argentina	3	1	0	2	56	54	2	6
Samoa	3	1	0	2	60	65	0	5

Pool C

Team	Pld	W	D	L	F	A	BP	TOTAL
Wales	3	2	0	1	76	57	2	10
England	3	2	0	1	50	61	0	8
Japan	3	0	0	3	26	176	0	0

Pool D

Team	Pld	W	D	L	F	A	BP	TOTAL
France	3	2	0	1	39	44	0	8
Ireland	3	1	0	2	28	58	1	5
Fiji	3	1	0	2	42	82	0	4

New Zealand, Australia, South Africa and Wales qualified for the Division A semi-finals by virtue of having the highest points in the pool stage.

Pool A vs Pool D Results

Date	Team	Score	Team	Venue
5 April 2007, 17:30	South Africa	36–5	Fiji	Belfast Harlequins, Belfast
5 April 2007, 19:30	Australia	15–10	Ireland	Ravenhill, Belfast
5 April 2007, 19:30	Scotland	6–11	France	Belfast Harlequins, Belfast
9 April 2007, 17:30	South Africa	8–17	France	Ravenhill, Belfast
9 April 2007, 19:30	Scotland	12–13	Ireland	Ravenhill, Belfast
9 April 2007, 19:30	Australia	23–12	Fiji	Shaw's Bridge, Belfast
13 April 2007, 17:30	Scotland	23–25	Fiji	Shaw's Bridge, Belfast
13 April 2007, 19:30	Australia	30–11	France	Belfast Harlequins, Belfast
13 April 2007, 19:30	South Africa	31–5	Ireland	Ravenhill, Belfast

Pool B vs Pool C Results

Date	Team	Score	Team	Venue
5 April 2007, 17:30	New Zealand	37–14	Wales	Ravenhill, Belfast
5 April 2007, 17:30	Argentina	41–8	Japan	Shaw's Bridge, Belfast
5 April 2007, 19:30	Samoa	12–20	England	Shaw's Bridge, Belfast
9 April 2007, 17:30	New Zealand	107–6	Japan	Belfast Harlequins, Belfast
9 April 2007, 17:30	Samoa	20–33	Wales	Shaw's Bridge, Belfast
9 April 2007, 19:30	Argentina	15–17	England	Belfast Harlequins, Belfast
13 April 2007, 17:30	New Zealand	34–13	England	Ravenhill, Belfast
13 April 2007, 17:30	Samoa	28–12	Japan	Belfast Harlequins, Belfast
13 April 2007, 19:30	Argentina	0–29	Wales	Shaw's Bridge, Belfast

=== Division B ===
Pool A

Team	Pld	W	D	L	F	A	BP	TOTAL
Romania	3	0	0	3	17	59	1	1
Russia	3	0	0	3	11	63	1	1
Zimbabwe	3	1	0	2	40	56	1	5

Pool B

Team	Pld	W	D	L	F	A	BP	TOTAL
Tonga	3	2	0	1	114	19	3	11
Chile	3	1	0	2	62	76	1	5
Chinese Taipei	3	0	1	2	21	127	0	2

Pool C

Team	Pld	W	D	L	F	A	BP	TOTAL
Italy	3	3	0	0	102	25	2	14
Uruguay	3	2	0	1	90	61	1	9
Cook Islands	3	0	1	2	30	111	0	2

Pool D

Team	Pld	W	D	L	F	A	BP	TOTAL
Canada	3	3	0	0	56	12	1	13
Georgia	3	2	0	1	78	39	4	12
United States	3	3	0	0	44	17	0	12

Italy, Canada, Georgia and the USA qualified for the Division B semi-finals by virtue of having the highest points in the pool stage.

Pool A vs Pool D Results

Date	Team	Score	Team	Venue
4 April 2007, 19:30	Romania	0–28	Georgia	Bangor, Bangor
4 April 2007, 19:30	Russia	0–6	United States	Malone, Belfast
4 April 2007, 19:30	Zimbabwe	0–8	Canada	Queen's, Belfast
8 April 2007, 14:30	Romania	10–16	United States	Queen's, Belfast
8 April 2007, 14:30	Russia	5–33	Canada	Bangor, Bangor
8 April 2007, 16:30	Zimbabwe	33–26	Georgia	Malone, Belfast
12 April 2007, 17:30	Zimbabwe	7–22	United States	Queen's, Belfast
12 April 2007, 19:30	Romania	7–15	Canada	Bangor, Bangor
12 April 2007, 19:30	Russia	6–24	Georgia	Malone, Belfast

Pool B vs Pool C Results

Date	Team	Score	Team	Venue
4 April 2007, 17:30	Tonga	36–5	Uruguay	Bangor, Bangor
4 April 2007, 17:30	Chile	29–14	Cook Islands	Queen's, Belfast
4 April 2007, 17:30	Chinese Taipei	6–62	Italy	Malone, Belfast
8 April 2007, 14:30	Tonga	72–6	Cook Islands	Malone, Belfast
8 April 2007, 16:30	Chile	13–32	Italy	Bangor, Bangor
8 April 2007, 16:30	Chinese Taipei	5–55	Uruguay	Queen's, Belfast
12 April 2007, 17:30	Chile	20–30	Uruguay	Bangor, Bangor
12 April 2007, 17:30	Chinese Taipei	10–10	Cook Islands	Malone, Belfast
12 April 2007, 19:30	Tonga	6–8	Italy	Queen's, Belfast

== Knock out phase ==
Using the final positions from the pool phase the knock-out round 1 matches were made on the following basis:

- Match 1 – 10th versus 11th
- Match 2 – 9th versus 12th
- Match 3 – 6th versus 7th
- Match 4 – 5th versus 8th
- Match 5 – 2nd versus 3rd (deemed a semi-final)
- Match 6 – 1st versus 4th (deemed a semi-final)

For round 2 of the knock out phase

- The loser of Match 1 plays the loser of Match 2 for 11th place
- The winner of Match 1 plays the winner of Match 2 for 9th place
- The loser of Match 3 plays the loser of Match 4 for 7th place
- The winner of Match 3 plays the winner of Match 4 for 5th place
- The loser of Match 5 plays the loser of Match 6 for 3rd place
- The winner of Match 5 plays the winner of Match 6 for 1st place (the final)

=== Division A ===
Round 1

Category	Date	Team	Score	Team	Venue
10th v 11th	17 April 2007, 17:30	Fiji	7–11	Scotland	Belfast Harlequins, Belfast
9th v 12th	17 April 2007, 19:30	Ireland	31–10	Japan	Shaw's Bridge, Belfast
6th v 7th	17 April 2007, 17:30	England	31–13	Argentina	Shaw's Bridge, Belfast
5th v 8th	17 April 2007, 19:30	France	25–13	Samoa	Belfast Harlequins, Belfast
2nd v 3rd	17 April 2007, 17:30	Australia	18–32	South Africa	Ravenhill, Belfast
1st v 4th	17 April 2007, 19:30	New Zealand	36–12	Wales	Ravenhill, Belfast

Round 2 (Play-offs)

Category	Date	Team	Score	Team	Venue
11th Place Play-Off	21 April 2007, 15:30	Fiji	60–12	Japan	Belfast Harlequins, Belfast
9th Place Play-Off	21 April 2007, 15:00	Scotland	0–34	Ireland	Ravenhill, Belfast
7th Place Play-Off	21 April 2007, 13:30	Argentina	12–13	Samoa	Shaw's Bridge, Belfast
5th Place Play-Off	21 April 2007, 15:30	England	17–43	France	Shaw's Bridge, Belfast
3rd Place Play-Off	21 April 2007, 17:30	Australia	25–21	Wales	Ravenhill, Belfast
Final	21 April 2007, 19:30	South Africa	7–31	New Zealand	Ravenhill, Belfast

=== Division B ===
Round 1

Category	Date	Team	Score	Team	Venue
10th v 11th	16 April 2007, 17:30	Chinese Taipei	10–35	Romania	Queen's, Belfast
9th v 12th	16 April 2007, 17:30	Cook Islands	14–22	Russia	Malone, Belfast
6th v 7th	16 April 2007, 17:30	Uruguay	21–3	Chile	Bangor, Bangor
5th v 8th	16 April 2007, 19:30	Tonga	26–11	Zimbabwe	Bangor, Bangor
2nd v 3rd	16 April 2007, 19:30	Canada	19–3	Georgia	Malone, Belfast
1st v 4th	16 April 2007, 19:30	Italy	31–6	United States	Queen's, Belfast

Round 2 (Play-offs)

Category	Date	Team	Score	Team	Venue
11th Place Play-Off	20 April 2007, 17:30	Chinese Taipei	29–10	Cook Islands	Malone, Belfast
9th Place Play-Off	20 April 2007, 17:30	Romania	20–10	Russia	Queen's, Belfast
7th Place Play-Off	20 April 2007, 19:30	Chile	10–12	Zimbabwe	Malone, Belfast
5th Place Play-Off	20 April 2007, 19:30	Uruguay	15–24	Tonga	Queen's, Belfast
3rd Place Play-Off	20 April 2007, 18:00	Georgia	5–24	United States	Bangor, Bangor
Final	20 April 2007, 19:30	Canada	3–22	Italy	Shaw's Bridge, Belfast

== Semi-finals ==
Year	Division	Semi-Final (2nd vs 3rd)			Semi-Final (1st vs 4th)		
Year	Division	Winner	Score	Loser	Winner	Score	Loser
2007	A	South Africa	32–18	Australia	New Zealand	36–12	Wales
2007	B	Canada	19–3	Georgia	Italy	31–6	United States

== Finals ==
Year	Division	Final			Third place match		
Year	Division	Winner	Score	Runner-up	3rd place	Score	4th place
2007	A	New Zealand	31–7	South Africa	Australia	25–21	Wales
2007	B	Italy	22–3	Canada	United States	24–5	Georgia

Therefore, New Zealand are the Under 19 Rugby World Champions for 2007 and Italy are promoted to Division A.

== Final standings ==
The final standings are based on the 3 pool matches plus a further 2 matches to determine standings.

Division A	Pos	Division B
New Zealand	1	Italy *
South Africa	2	Canada
Australia	3	United States
Wales	4	Georgia
France	5	Tonga
England	6	Uruguay
Samoa	7	Zimbabwe #
Argentina	8	Chile #
Ireland	9	Romania #
Scotland	10	Russia #
Fiji	11	Chinese Taipei #
Japan *	12	Cook Islands #

* Japan was initially demoted to Division B and Italy promoted to Division A for future World Championships. However, with the creation of the IRB Junior World Championship, both teams competed in its inaugural edition in 2008. This event featured all teams from the 2007 Division A, plus Italy, Canada, the US, and Tonga.

# Zimbabwe, Chile, Romania, Russia, Chinese Taipei and the Cook Islands were initially relegated from Division B and had to enter regional competitions to qualify for future World Championships. This did not change with the creation of the Junior World Championship and IRB Junior World Trophy; Georgia and Uruguay were given automatic berths to the 2008 IRB Junior World Trophy, while remaining nations had to play in regional qualifying for the remaining six berths.

== Overall Stats ==
Overall Points
Pos.	Player	Country	Points
1	Leigh Halfpenny	Wales	57
2	Germán Albanell	Uruguay	56
3	Sione Toke	Tonga	54
4	Riccardo Bocchino	Italy	50
5	Trent Renata	New Zealand	42
6	Hamish Roberts	United States	32
7=	Daniel Kirkpatrick	New Zealand	37
7=	Stefan Watermeyer	South Africa	37
9	Mathieu Belie	France	35
10	Nathan Hirayama	Canada	33
11	Alex Goode	England	31
12	Kade Poki	New Zealand	30
13	Titi Jnr Esau	Samoa	28
14=	Stephen McColl	Scotland	26
14=	Eoin O'Malley	Ireland	26
16=	Andrew Barrett	Australia	25
16=	Alberto Chiesa	Italy	25
16=	Francisco González	Chile	25
16=	Bogdan Petreanu	Romania	25
16=	Henry Speight	Fiji	25
