= 2008 IRB Junior World Rugby Trophy =

Tournament details
- Host nation: Chile
- Dates: 15 April 2008 – 27 April 2008
- No. of nations: 8

Final positions
- Champions: Uruguay
- Runner-up: Chile

Tournament statistics
- Matches played: 16

The inaugural IRB Junior World Rugby Trophy was hosted by Chile in April 2008. The eight-team competition for national men under-20 sides is the second tier of the IRB Junior World Championship, which replaced the U19 & U21 World Championships.

== Pool Stage ==
=== Pool A ===
Team	Pld	W	D	L	TF	PF	PA	+/-	BP	Pts	Status
Chile	3	3	0	0	9	67	19	+48	1	13	Into final
Romania	3	2	0	1	12	77	47	+30	2	10	Into play-off for 3rd place
Namibia	3	1	0	2	7	57	62	−5	2	6	Into play-off for 5th place
Cook Islands	3	0	0	3	3	31	104	−73	0	0	Into play-off for 7th place

15 April 2008
2:00pm

Romania	28 – 26	Namibia

Stade Français, Santiago

15 April 2008
4:00pm

Cook Islands	10 – 33	Chile

Stade Français, Santiago

19 April 2008
2:00pm

Romania	46 – 7	Cook Islands

Estadio San Carlos de Apoquindo, Santiago

19 April 2008
4:00pm

Chile	20 – 6	Namibia

Estadio San Carlos de Apoquindo, Santiago

23 April 2008
4:00pm

Namibia	25 – 14	Cook Islands

Estadio San Carlos de Apoquindo, Santiago

23 April 2008
4:00pm

Chile	14 – 3	Romania

Stade Français, Santiago

=== Pool B ===
Team	Pld	W	D	L	TF	PF	PA	+/-	BP	Pts	Status
Uruguay	3	3	0	0	24	169	24	+145	2	14	Into final
Georgia	3	2	0	1	23	156	54	+102	3	11	Into play-off for 3rd place
South Korea	3	1	0	2	15	94	134	−40	2	6	Into play-off for 5th place
Jamaica	3	0	0	3	2	20	227	−207	0	0	Into play-off for 7th place

15 April 2008
2:00pm

Georgia	90 – 3	Jamaica

Estadio San Carlos de Apoquindo, Santiago

15 April 2008
4:00pm

Uruguay	67 – 8	South Korea

Estadio San Carlos de Apoquindo, Santiago

19 April 2008
2:00pm

Georgia	50 – 31	South Korea

Stade Français, Santiago

19 April 2008
4:00pm

Jamaica	0 – 82	Uruguay

Stade Français, Santiago

23 April 2008
2:00pm

South Korea	55 – 17	Jamaica

Estadio San Carlos de Apoquindo, Santiago

23 April 2008
2:00pm

Uruguay	20 – 16	Georgia

Stade Français, Santiago

== Play-offs ==
=== 7th-place play-off ===
27 April 2008
10:00am

Cook Islands	54 – 15	Jamaica

Stade Français, Santiago

=== 5th-place play-off ===
27 April 2008
12:00pm

Namibia	36 – 29	South Korea

Stade Français, Santiago

=== 3rd-place play-off ===
27 April 2008
2:00pm

Romania	10 – 34	Georgia

Stade Français, Santiago

=== Final ===
27 April 2008
4:00pm

Chile	8 – 20	Uruguay

Stade Français, Santiago

== See also ==
- 2008 IRB Junior World Championship
