= U20 Barthés Trophy =

African rugby competition

- Current season, competition or edition: 2026 U20 Barthés Trophy
- Sport: Rugby Union
- Founded: 2007
- No. of teams: 8
- Continent: Africa
- Most recent champion: Kenya

The U20 Barthés Trophy is an annual rugby union competition that features national Under-20 teams from Africa, organised by Rugby Africa. The tournament began in 2007 with Uganda as the host, which saw Namibia winning the title.

The tournament champion qualifies to the following year's World Rugby U20 Trophy organised by World Rugby. The trophy is named after Jean-Luc Barthés, a key figure in the development of rugby in Africa who died on 10 February 2016.

== History ==
The 2020 tournament was postponed due to the COVID-19 pandemic.

=== U20 Barthés Trophy ===
Year	Host	Winner	Runner-up	Third place	Fourth place
2017	Madagascar	Namibia	Kenya	Zimbabwe	Madagascar
2018	Namibia	Namibia	Kenya	Zimbabwe	Madagascar
2019	Kenya	Kenya	Namibia	Senegal	Tunisia
2020	Cancelled				
2021	Kenya	Kenya	Madagascar	Senegal	—N/a
2022	Kenya	Zimbabwe	Namibia	Kenya	Madagascar
2023	Kenya	Zimbabwe	Kenya	Namibia	Tunisia
2024	Zimbabwe	Kenya	Zimbabwe	Namibia	Tunisia
2025	Zimbabwe	Namibia	Kenya	Zimbabwe	Tunisia
Performance Division
2026	Uganda	Kenya	Namibia	Zimbabwe	Tunisia

Division One
Year	Host	Winner	Runner-up	Third place	Fourth place
2026	Uganda	Uganda	Zambia	—N/a	—N/a

=== Previous Tournaments ===
==== Division A ====
Year	Host	Winner	Runner-up	Third place	Fourth place
2007	Uganda	Namibia	Zimbabwe	Morocco	Tunisia
2008	Tunisia	Namibia	Zimbabwe	Kenya	—N/a
2009	Kenya	Zimbabwe	Namibia	Kenya	Morocco
2010	Ivory Coast	Zimbabwe	Namibia	—N/a	—N/a
2011	Zimbabwe	Zimbabwe	Namibia	Kenya	Madagascar
2012	Zimbabwe	Namibia	Zimbabwe	Kenya	Tunisia
2013	South Africa	Namibia	Kenya	Zimbabwe	Madagascar
2014	Namibia	Namibia	Kenya	Zimbabwe	Tunisia
2015	Zimbabwe	Namibia	Zimbabwe	Kenya	Uganda
2016	Namibia	Namibia	Zimbabwe	Kenya	Tunisia

==== Division B ====
Year	Host	Winner	Runner-up	Third place	Fourth place
2007	Kenya	Kenya	Uganda	Ivory Coast	—N/a
2012	Zimbabwe	Madagascar	Zimbabwe Select	Zambia	Morocco
2013	Tunisia	Tunisia	Uganda	Senegal	—N/a
2014	Uganda	Uganda	Madagascar	Senegal	Zambia
2015	Tunisia	Tunisia	Senegal	Madagascar	Morocco
