= Chilean Rugby Federation =

Highest governing body of rugby in Chile

Federación de Rugby de Chile
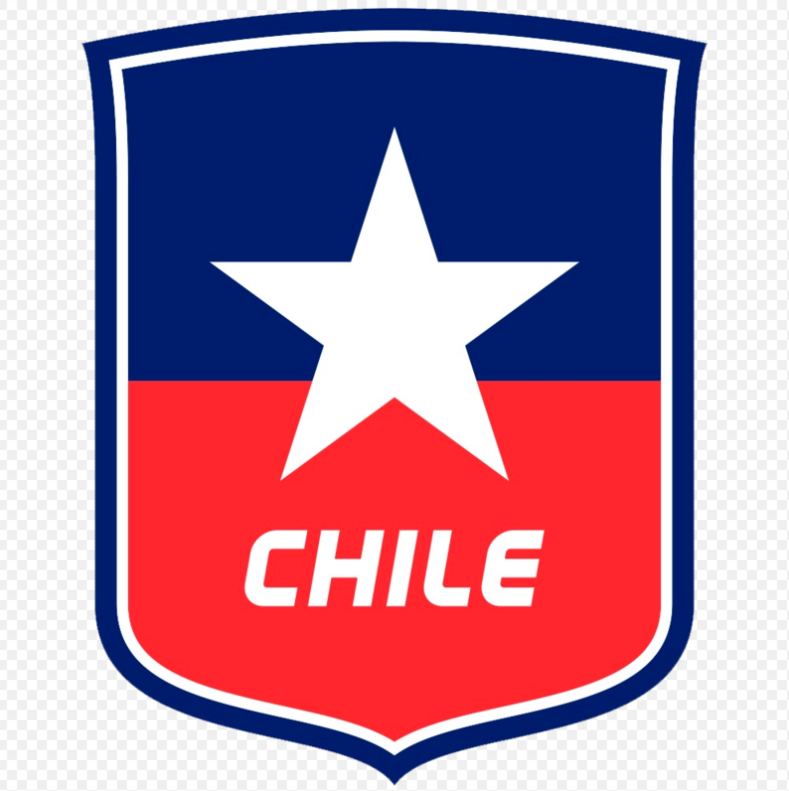
- Sport: Rugby union
- Founded: 1953; 69 years ago
- World Rugby affiliation: 1991
- Sudamérica Rugby affiliation: 1988
- President: Cristian Rudloff
- Website: www.chilerugby.org

The Chilean Rugby Federation (Spanish: Federación de Rugby de Chile) is the governing body for rugby union in Chile. The Federation is responsible for the various national teams representing Chile in international competitions. The Federation is a member of several international organizations, such as World Rugby, and Sudamérica Rugby (the regional governing body for rugby in South America). The Federation is led by President Francisco Davanzo Pumarino. The Federation includes over 18,000 players.

The Chilean Rugby Federation was founded 4 May 1953. The Federation joined the IRB (World Rugby) in 1991.

== National teams ==
Chile's national team is known as the Condors. Chile has played in the annual South American Rugby Championship since the tournament began in 1951. Chile has finished in third place in the South American Rugby Championship (behind Argentina and Uruguay) almost every year since 1983. Chile also participates in qualifying matches for the Rugby World Cup, making their debut in the 2023 Rugby World Cup in France.

The Chile national rugby sevens team represents Chile in international rugby sevens tournaments. Chile's rugby sevens team has played at the USA Sevens on the World Rugby Sevens Series, at the Rugby World Cup Sevens, and at the Pan American Games since rugby sevens was added in 2011.

The Chile national under-20 rugby union team has played in the IRB Junior World Rugby Trophy. Chile finished second in 2008, and third in 2009 and 2013. Chile hosted the tournament in 2008 and 2013.

== Leadership ==
- 1953 - 1955 Kenneth Dunford *
- 1956 - 1957 Leonardo Mascaro V. *
- 1958 - 1959 Rodolfo Pincas
- 1960 - 1961 Rodolfo Pincas
- 1962 - 1963 Jorge Chavez Sánchez
- 1964 - 1965 Luis Felipe Mujica M. *
- 1966 - 1967 Fernando De Castro *
- 1968 - 1969 Leslie Cooper *
- 1970 - 1971 Ronald Miles
- 1972 - 1974 Patricio Campos N. *
- 1975 - 1979 Luis Bernabo Ody
- 1980 - 1982 Sergio Bascuñan Martinez
- 1983 - 1986 Alberto Jory Walker
- 1986 - 1987 Jorge Pizarro S.
- 1988 - 1989 Sergio Bascuñan Martinez
- 1990 - 1991 Alberto Jory Walker
- 1991 - 1993 Claudio Cabrera Berceruelo
- 1994 - 1995 Ernesto Sirner Bugueño
- 1996 - 1997 Miguel A. Mujica Brain
- 1998 - 1999 Julio Calisto Hurtado
- 2000 - 2007 Miguel A. Mujica Brain
- 2007 - 2008 Carlos Silva Echiburou
- 2008 - 2009 Alastair MacGregor
- 2009 - 2012 Sebastián Pinto
- 2012 - 2015 Francisco Davanzo Pumarino
- 2015 - 2019 Jorge Araya
- 2019 - 2023 Cristian Rudloff

== See also ==
- Rugby union in Chile
- Chile national rugby union team
- Chile national rugby sevens team
- Chile national under-20 rugby union team
