= 2016 U-19 Asia Rugby Championship =

Tournament details
- Host: Malaysia
- Date: 11 – 17 December 2016
- Countries: 4

Final positions
- Champions: Hong Kong
- Relegated: Malaysia

Tournament statistics
- Matches played: 6

The 2016 U-19 Asia Rugby Championship is an international rugby union competition for Under 20 national teams in Asia. The winners will secure a berth at the 2017 World Rugby Under 20 Trophy.

== Top division ==
The top division will be hosted by Malaysia from 11–17 December 2016.

Champions and qualification
for the 2017 World Rugby Under 20 Trophy.
Relegated

Position	Nation	Games				Points			Bonus		Point
Position	Nation	Played	Won	Drawn	Lost	For	Against	Difference	Tries	Losing	Point
1	Hong Kong	3	3	0	0	182	18	164	3	0	15
2	Chinese Taipei	3	1	0	2	70	117	-47	2	1	7
3	Sri Lanka	3	1	0	2	52	119	-67	1	2	7
4	Malaysia	3	1	0	2	75	125	-50	1	1	6
Source: ThePapare.com (Participants only, excluding results)

== Division 1 ==
2016 U-19 Asia Rugby Championship division 1
Tournament details
- Host: Philippines
- Date: 14 – 17 December 2016
- Countries: 4

Final positions
- Champions: South Korea

Tournament statistics
- Matches played: 4

Division 1 was hosted by the Philippines at the International School Manila in Taguig from 14–17 December 2016. The winner was promoted to the top division.

Semi-finals
14 December 2016
Philippines	10
South Korea	26
14 December 2016
Singapore	10
United Arab Emirates	14

Final
17 December 2016
South Korea	14
United Arab Emirates	13
Third place play-off
17 December 2016
Singapore	35
Philippines	15

14 December 2016

Philippines	10–26	South Korea
	Report

International School Manila, Taguig

14 December 2016

Singapore	10–14	United Arab Emirates
	Report

International School Manila, Taguig

17 December 2016

Singapore	35–15	Philippines
	Report

International School Manila, Taguig

17 December 2016

South Korea	14–13	United Arab Emirates
	Report

International School Manila, Taguig
