= 2014 IRB Junior World Rugby Trophy =

Tournament details
- Host: Hong Kong
- Date: 7 – 19 April 2014
- Teams: 8

Final positions
- Champions: Japan
- Runner-up: Tonga
- Third place: United States

Tournament statistics
- Matches played: 16
- Top scorer(s): (Georgia (country)) Rezi Jinchvelashvili (63)
- Most tries: (Georgia (country)) Vakhtang Amiranashvili (4) (Uruguay) German Kessler (4)

The 2014 IRB Junior World Rugby Trophy was the seventh IRB Junior World Rugby Trophy, an annual international rugby union competition for Under-20 national teams, second-tier world championship.

The event was held in Hong Kong and was organized by rugby's governing body, the International Rugby Board.

== Teams ==
Pool	Team	Number of Tournaments	Position Last Year	Best Position
B	Canada	4	2	
A	Georgia	4	3	
A	Hong Kong	0	N/A	
B	Japan	4	4	
B	Namibia	3	8	
A	Tonga	2	5	
A	United States	4	Relegated from 2013 IRB JWC	Won the Trophy in 2012
B	Uruguay	4	7	Won the Trophy in 2008

== Pool Stage ==
=== Pool A ===
Team	Pld	W	D	L	TF	PF	PA	PD	BP	Pts
Tonga	3	2	0	1	10	77	72	+5	2	10
United States	3	2	0	1	7	72	40	+32	2	10
Georgia	3	2	0	1	6	67	31	+36	1	9
Hong Kong	3	0	0	3	2	24	97	-73	0	0

==== Fixtures ====
7 April 2014
17:00

Tonga	10 – 37	Georgia

Hong Kong Football Club Stadium, Hong Kong

7 April 2014
19:00

United States	37 – 0	Hong Kong

Hong Kong Football Club Stadium, Hong Kong

11 April 2014
15:00

United States	13 – 12	Georgia

Hong Kong Football Club Stadium, Hong Kong

11 April 2014
17:00

Tonga	39 – 16	Hong Kong

Hong Kong Football Club Stadium, Hong Kong

15 April 2014
13:00

Georgia	21 – 8	Hong Kong

Hong Kong Football Club Stadium, Hong Kong

15 April 2014
15:00

United States	22 – 28	Tonga

Hong Kong Football Club Stadium, Hong Kong

=== Pool B ===
Team	Pld	W	D	L	TF	PF	PA	PD	BP	Pts
Japan	3	2	0	1	15	99	73	+26	4	12
Uruguay	3	2	1	0	6	67	59	+8	0	10
Namibia	3	1	0	2	8	78	75	+3	3	7
Canada	3	0	1	2	6	55	92	-37	0	2

==== Fixtures ====
7 April 2014
13:00

Japan	28 – 33	Uruguay

Hong Kong Football Club Stadium, Hong Kong

7 April 2014
15:00

Canada	25 – 37	Namibia

Hong Kong Football Club Stadium, Hong Kong

11 April 2014
13:00

Japan	34 – 28	Namibia

Hong Kong Football Club Stadium, Hong Kong

11 April 2014
19:00

Canada	18 – 18	Uruguay

Hong Kong Football Club Stadium, Hong Kong

15 April 2014
17:00

Uruguay	16 – 13	Namibia

Hong Kong Football Club Stadium, Hong Kong

15 April 2014
19:00

Canada	12 – 37	Japan

Hong Kong Football Club Stadium, Hong Kong

== Knockout stage ==
=== 7th place game ===
19 April 2014
13:00

Hong Kong	30 – 33	Canada

Hong Kong Football Club Stadium, Hong Kong

=== 5th place game ===
19 April 2014
15:00

Georgia	46 – 17	Namibia

Hong Kong Football Club Stadium, Hong Kong

=== Third place game ===
19 April 2014
17:00

United States	26 – 25	Uruguay

Hong Kong Football Club Stadium, Hong Kong

=== Final ===
19 April 2014
19:00

Tonga	10 – 35	Japan

Hong Kong Football Club Stadium, Hong Kong
