= 2021 U20 Barthés Trophy =

Tournament details
- Host: Kenya
- Date: 24 June – 11 July
- Countries: Kenya; Madagascar; Senegal

Final positions
- Champions: Kenya
- Runner-up: Madagascar
- Third place: Senegal

Tournament statistics
- Matches played: 3
- Tries scored: 19 (6.33 per match)
- Website: www.rugbyafrique.com

The 2021 U20 Barthés Trophy was the 2021 edition of the U20 Barthés Trophy, a rugby union competition for African U20 teams. The tournament was held from 24 June to 11 July 2021 in Nairobi, Kenya. Only three nations participated in the event, hosts Kenya competed against Senegal and Madagascar. Kenya eventually won the tournament.

== Standings ==
2021 U20 Barthés Trophy Champions

Pos	Nation	Games				Points			Bonus points	Total points
Pos	Nation	Played	Won	Lost	Drawn	For	Against	Diff	Bonus points	Total points
1	Kenya	2	2	0	0	71	23	+48	1	9
2	Madagascar	2	1	1	0	54	24	+30	2	6
3	Senegal	2	0	2	0	6	84	-78	0	0

== Fixtures ==
26 June 2021
04:00 PM EAT (UTC+03:00)

Kenya	50–3	Senegal
	Report

Nyayo National Stadium
Attendance: N/A
Referee: Precious Pazani

3 July 2021
01:30 PM EAT (UTC+03:00)

Madagascar	34–3	Senegal
	Report

Nyayo National Stadium
Attendance: N/A
Referee: Victor Odour

11 July 2021
01:30 PM EAT (UTC+03:00)

Kenya	21–20	Madagascar
	Report

Nyayo National Stadium
Attendance: N/A
Referee: Saudah Adiru
