= Sharjah Wanderers =

Sporting club based in Sharjah, United Arab Emirates

Sharjah Wanderers Sports Club is a sporting club based in the Samnan suburb of Sharjah in the United Arab Emirates. It has long been popular with the Western expatriate community in Sharjah, and is the centre for a range of sporting and community events including rugby, cricket, football and swimming. Sharjah Wanderers also has a golf club. It was for many years co-located with the Sharjah English School.

Wanderers takes its name from one of the two football teams which originated with the RAF and Trucial Oman Scouts (TOS) playing at RAF Sharjah in the 1960s, the other being the Canaries. They played in the Trucial States League of the time, which included the TOS; Dubai Union A and B; Sharjah Town; Young Sharjah and BP.

== History ==
Sharjah Wanderers came into existence in 1976 when a group of expatriates living in Sharjah and working for construction companies Halcrow and Tarmac wanted to establish a rugby pitch. The group, many of whom played for the Dubai Exiles rugby team, approached the ruler of Sharjah, HH Dr Sheikh Sultan bin Muhammad Al-Qasimi, and asked if he would allow them to build such a pitch. The ruler granted the land, at the time in a site far removed from the city and only accessible by 4X4 vehicles. A community effort resulted in the construction of the pitch and a clubhouse which has evolved to become a community centre, with an eponymous rugby team.

The Sharjah Wanderers Rugby Club has been claimed to be one of the UAE’s most popular and oldest rugby clubs. It hosts a number of national rugby tournaments, including the 'Sharjah 10s'. It is a members only club, where alcohol can be legally sold and consumed in otherwise 'dry' Sharjah. Wanderers maintains sporting facilities in Samnan and an 18-hole sand golf course off the Sharjah Airport Road. It is also home to the Sharjah Wanderers British Sub-Aqua Club (BSAC).
