= Rugby union in Chile =

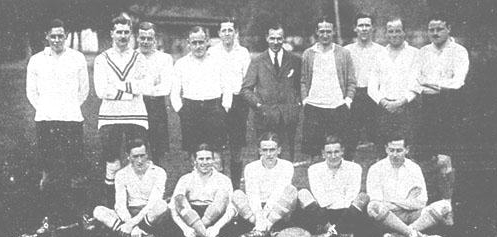
- An English rugby union team in Valparaíso 1925.
- Country: Chile
- Governing body: Chilean Rugby Federation
- National team: Chile
- First played: Late 19th century
- Registered players: 18,755
- Clubs: 99

National competitions
- Rugby World Cup; Rugby World Cup Sevens; IRB Sevens World Series

Rugby union in Chile is a fairly popular sport.

The Chilean Rugby Federation was founded on 4 May 1953 and governs the sport in Chile. Their statutes and regulations were officialized at 16 December 1963. It is affiliated to the Olympic Committee of Chile, the Confederación Sudamericana de Rugby, FIRA and World Rugby. In July 2022 the men's national team defeated the USA to qualify for the 2023 Rugby World Cup in France, the first time the country has qualified for the competition. Following this the team reached an all-time high world ranking of 21.

== History ==
Rugby was first introduced into South America in the late 19th century by British immigrants, but this was mainly in Brazil and neighbouring Argentina.

It was introduced by the British in the 19th century. It is believed that the first people who played it in Chile were the English who worked at the saltmines in Iquique. Rugby was also developed by the English private colleges. For many years it was a sport mostly played by the upper classes in Chile. The first teams appeared in Valparaíso and Santiago de Chile, who later formed the Unión de Rugby de Chile. The British influence can be noticed by the fact that several of the main Chilean teams have English names.

Some rugby did trickle across the border from Argentina, but it was not until the 1920s that the game really became established, around Santiago and Valparaíso.

During the 1950s, Chile was visited by the Irish tour of 1952 and a 1954 French tour.

Chilean delegates were amongst those who went to the centenary congress of the International Rugby Football Board in 1986.

In South America, with the dominance of Argentina, Chile used to consider itself the best of the rest. This was confirmed in many people's minds when Chile won the second place in the 1981 South American Championship in the absence of Argentina. However, of the other South American nations only Uruguay The Only One That Had qualified for the Rugby World Cup Until 2022 When Chile Qualified To Its First Rugby World Cup by beating USA Rugby 52-51 .

In the late 1980s, former French coach Jean-Pierre Juanchich became national administrator of the sport, lending it some extra credibility. During the 1980s, Chilean rugby participation increased by 400%, and whereas it was previously confined to the cities of Santiago and Valparaíso, it began to spread throughout the country.

=== Flight 571 and "Alive" ===
The tragic crash of Uruguayan Air Force Flight 571, and the resulting books and films, Alive: The Story of the Andes Survivors and Alive brought Uruguayan and Chilean rugby into the global limelight. The Uruguayans were on tour, and had played several games in Argentina, and were due to play some return matches in Chile.

Alive tells the story of a Uruguayan Rugby team (who were alumni of Stella Maris College (Montevideo)) and their friends and family who were involved in the airplane crash of Uruguayan Air Force Flight 571 which crashed into the Andes Mountains on October 13, 1972. It was published two years after survivors of the crash were rescued.

== National team ==
The Chile national rugby union team, known as "Los Condores" ("The Condors") it is currently ranked 25th in the World Rugby Rankings, and it is the third best team from South America, after Argentina and Uruguay.

== Women's rugby ==
Although Chile's women have not yet played test match rugby, they have been playing international sevens rugby since 2004. (Current playing record).

== Domestic organisation ==
Chile National Rugby Championship started in 1948, and its first winner was Prince of Wales Country Club.
