= Cook Islands national under-20 rugby union team =

Cook Islands Under 20
- Union: Cook Islands Rugby Union
- Nickname: Cookies
Team kit

The Cook Islands national Under 20 rugby team is for Cook Islands rugby union players aged 20 or under on January 1 of the year during which they are selected. The team has played at the World Rugby U20 Trophy and also competes at the Oceania U20 Championship.

Under 20 age grade rugby came into existence as a result of the IRB combining the Under 19 Rugby World Championship and Under 21 Rugby World Championship into a single IRB Junior World Championship tournament.

== 2008 Junior World Trophy ==
In April 2008, Chile hosted the 2008 IRB Junior World Rugby Trophy. The Cook Islands lost their three pool matches against Chile, Romania, and Namibia before winning the 7th place play-off against Jamaica by 55–15.
