= Woodburn Stadium =

Multi-purpose stadium in Pietermaritzburg, South Africa

Coordinates: 29°36′40″S 30°23′28″E

Woodburn Rugby Stadium
- Interactive map of Woodburn Rugby Stadium
- Location: Pietermaritzburg, South Africa
- Capacity: 12,000

Tenants
- Midlands Rugby, KwaZulu-Natal Rugby Union

Woodburn Rugby Stadium is a multi-purpose stadium in Pietermaritzburg, South Africa.

It is sometimes used by the Sharks rugby team in the Currie Cup.

The stadium was also used for the opening of the KwaZulu-Natal Legislature in November 2025.
