= Under 19 Rugby World Championship =

Rugby competition

- Sport: Rugby union
- Instituted: 2004
- Ceased: 2007; 19 years ago
- Regional: International (World Rugby)
- Holders: New Zealand (2007)
- Most titles: New Zealand (2 titles)

The IRB under 19 Rugby World Cup was the premier tournament for male rugby union players under the age of 19 organized by the sports governing body (the International Rugby Board (IRB) )annually from 2004 to 2007. Both under 19 Rugby world cup and the Under 21 Rugby World Championship were replaced by the IRB Junior World Championship for under-20 players which started in 2008.

== Format ==
Twenty-four teams took part in each tournament. They were placed into two divisions (A and B) based on rankings. Each division was split into four pools (labeled A-D) of three according to their past performance. Each team played three matches against three teams of a specific pool (i.e. pool A played against pool D and pool B played against pool C). Four points were awarded for a win, two for a draw, and none for a loss. One bonus point was awarded for scoring 4 tries or more, and one bonus point was awarded for loss by 7 points or less.

After all the pool matches, the teams were ranked by total match points. The top four teams qualified for the semifinals (1st against 4th and 2nd against 3rd). Similarly, other teams entered play-offs for positions 5-8 and 9-12.

The winning semi-finalists met in the final and the losing semi-finalists played to decide third place. The division A winning team won the tournament outright and the division B winning team earned the right to move up to division A the following year at the expense of the team which came 12th in division A, which fell to division B.

== Results ==
Ed.	Year	Host	Final			Third place match		
Ed.	Year	Host	Winner	Score	Runner-up	3rd place	Score	4th place
1	2004	South Africa	New Zealand	34–11	France	South Africa	38–31	England
2	2005	South Africa	South Africa	20–15	New Zealand	Australia	29–21	England
3	2006	United Arab Emirates	Australia	17–13	New Zealand	England (Note: Won on number of tries scored.)	12–12	France
4	2007	Ireland	New Zealand	31–7	South Africa	Australia	25–21	Wales
