= United States national under-19 rugby union team =

United States U-19
- Union: USA Rugby
- Nickname(s): Boys High School All-Americans
- Coach(es): Salty Thompson
Team kit	Change kit

The United States Boys High School All-American Team is the United States' U-19 rugby team at the national level. The Boys' High School All-Americans, sponsored by Aircraft Charter Solutions, are the best Junior Varsity (U17) and Varsity (U19) male rugby players from across the country, and compete as both 15s and Sevens squads.

== Recent results ==
The following table shows the results of the U.S. Boys High School All-American Team in official matches during the previous 24 months, as well as upcoming fixtures.

Date	Opponent	Result	Location	Event	Top U.S. Scorer
2017-04-07	Portugal under-19		QUIMPER - CREAC'H GWEN, France	2017 U18 Rugby Europe Championship	
2016-07-16	BC under-19	W (54–3)	British Columbia, Canada	2016 British Columbia Tour	
2016-07-13	BC under-19	W (48–0)	British Columbia, Canada	2016 British Columbia Tour	
2016-07-02	Ontario Blues under-19	W (38–5)	Oakville, Canada	2016 Ontario Tour	Reid Brandt
2016-06-30	Ontario Blues under-19	W (27–14)	Oakville, Canada	2016 Ontario Tour	Ruben de Haas

=== Management ===
- Salty Thompson - Head Coach
- Brendan Keane - Assistant
- Scott Bracken - Assistant
- JD Stephenson - Assistant

=== Roster ===
The following is the Roster for the 2016 Ontario Tour and the 2016 BC Tour.

Name	Position	HS Year	Rugby Club	RCT	Tour
Andrew Baldado	Centre	Senior	St. Ignacious	South	2016 Ontario Tour
Steven Benson	Lock	Junior	Little Rock Junior Stormers	South	2016 Ontario Tour
Luke Bienstock	Wing	Senior	Greenwich High School	Northeast	2016 Ontario Tour
Zachary Biggs	Hooker	Senior	Penn Boys Rugby	South	2016 Ontario Tour
Brandon Boon	Fly half	Senior	Unionville Rugby Club	Northeast	2016 Ontario Tour
John Bradfield	Full back	Junior	St Edward High School	South	2016 Ontario Tour
Reid Brandt	Lock	Junior	Charlotte Catholic School	South	2016 Ontario Tour
Grant Broeder	Full back	Senior	Eureka Rugby	West	2016 Ontario Tour
Satchel Carnine	Prop	Senior	Penn High School	South	2016 Ontario Tour
Ruben de Haas	Scrum half	Junior	Little Rock Junior Stormers	South	2016 Ontario Tour
Jayden Demmy	Centre	Senior	West Shore United	Northeast	2016 Ontario Tour
Austin Rozelle	Centre	Junior	St Pete Rugby Club	South	2016 Ontario Tour
Jake Hedge	Hooker	Senior	Shore School, Sydney	-	2016 Ontario Tour
Zach Heisterkamp	Flanker	Senior	St Edward Rugby	Northeast	2016 Ontario Tour
Mike Jennings	Centre	Junior	Staples	Northeast	2016 Ontario Tour
Jack Miller	Flanker	Senior	Brookline	Northeast	2016 Ontario Tour
Eric Naposki-Abdalah	Wing	Junior	Fairfield Pegasi	Northeast	2016 Ontario Tour
Karem Odeh	Prop	Senior	Brunswick	Northeast	2016 Ontario Tour
Luke Persanis	Scrum half	Junior	Pelham High School	Northeast	2016 Ontario Tour
Jonas Petrakopoulos	Prop	Junior	Royal Irish	West	2016 Ontario Tour
Joe Rusert-Cuddy	Flanker	Junior	Palmer Terrors	West	2016 Ontario Tour
Joshua Schnell	Lock	Junior	Katy Rugby Club	West	2016 Ontario Tour
Bronson Teles	Eight	Senior	Katy Rugby Club	West	2016 Ontario Tour
Nathan Watts	Prop	Senior	Dallas Harlequin Colts	West	2016 Ontario Tour
Bailey Wilson	Eight	Sophomore	United Varsity Rugby (UT)	West	2016 Ontario Tour
Marcos Young	Fly half	Junior	Key Biscayne	South	2016 Ontario Tour
David Ainu'u	Prop	Junior	Liberty	Northwest	2016 BC Tour
Ben Broselle	Centre	Junior	Chuckanut	Northwest	2016 BC Tour
Brendon Curle	Flyhalf	Senior	Union	Northwest	2016 BC Tour
Taylor Damron	Utility back	Senior	Back Bay Sharks	West	2016 BC Tour
James Downey	Scrum half	Junior	San Diego Mustangs	West and Northwest	2016 BC Tour
Owen Duvall	Prop	Senior	Cathedral Catholic	West	2016 BC Tour
Carlos Gomez	Wing	Junior	Danville Oaks	Northwest	2016 BC Tour
Benny Gonda	Prop	Senior	Santa Monica	West	2016 BC Tour
Anton Grigoriou	Flyhalf	Senior	Back Bay Sharks	West	2016 BC Tour
Ryan James	Wing	Junior	Young Aztecs	West	2016 BC Tour
Justin Johnson	Flanker	Senior	Mira Costa High School	West and Northwest	2016 BC Tour
Sean Lumkong	Centre	Junior	La Costa Canyon	West and Northwest	2016 BC Tour
Nafitalai Maafu	Lock	Senior	Tempe	West	2016 BC Tour
Patrick Madden	Full back	Junior	Young Aztecs	West	2016 BC Tour
Sosefo Mailangi-Ray	Eight	Senior	Back Bay Sharks	West	2016 BC Tour
Sim Mander	Centre	Senior	St. Paul's, London	-	2016 BC Tour
Lia Monis	Lock	Senior	Rainier Junior Highlanders	Northwest	2016 BC Tour
Jeremy Ockomichalak	Prop	Junior	Santa Monica	West	2016 BC Tour
Oscar Ockomichalek	Hooker	Senior	Santa Monica	West	2016 BC Tour
Justin Oles	Flanker	Senior	Granite Bay Grizzlies	Northwest	2016 BC Tour
Cutler Pons	Scrum half	Junior	Peninsula Green	Northwest	2016 BC Tour
Kevin Saunders	Centre	Junior	Danville Oaks	Northwest	2016 BC Tour
Devin Short	Lock	Senior	Blackhawks	West	2016 BC Tour
Elijah Tafao-Braganza	Flanker	Junior	Danville Oaks	Northwest	2016 BC Tour
Halleluiah Tiauli	Hooker	Senior	Rainier Junior Highlanders	Northwest	2016 BC Tour
Joshua Warnock	Lock	Senior	Peninsula Green	Northwest	2016 BC Tour
