= Chile national under-20 rugby union team =

Chile
- Union: Chilean Rugby Federation
- Coach: Eduardo Etcheto
Team kit

First international
- Chile 33–10 Cook Islands (15 April 2008)

Largest win
- Chile 80–7 Brazil (12 October 2026)

Largest defeat
- South Africa 97–0 Chile (21 May 2026)

World Cup
- Appearances: 0

The Chile national under-20 rugby union team participates in the IRB Junior World Rugby Trophy. Chile has finished among the top three teams several times in the IRB JWRT, and has twice hosted the event.

== Current squad ==
=== 2026 World Rugby Under 20 Challenger Cup ===
Forwards: Maximiliano Abumohor; Mateo Alcaide; Lucca Baglietto; Cristóbal Barrera; Gianfranco De Giorgis; Benjamín Díaz; Cristóbal Escobar; Stefano Maino; Cristián Olmos; Cristián Riquelme; Clemente Rodríguez; Max Schlesinger; Rafael Silva; Cristóbal Soto; Ignacio Valdés; Lukas Vega	Backs: Marco Alvano; Thomas Baguley; Sebastián Benavente; José Tomás Bonilla; José Pablo Fernández; Agustín Infante; Lucas Pizarro; Tomás Queirolo; Claudio Roa; Cristóbal Serrano; Jaime Soler; Nicolás Weitzel; Luka Winkler; Santiago Wood

== Management ==
- Eduardo Etcheto - Team Manager

== See also ==
- Rugby union in Chile
- Chilean Rugby Federation
- Chile national rugby union team
