= New Zealand national under-19 rugby union team =

New Zealand
- Union: New Zealand Rugby Union
- Coach: (New Zealand)
- Captain: (New Zealand)
- Most caps: (-)
- Top scorer: (-)
Team kit	Change kit

World Cup
- Best result: Champions 1999, 2001, 2002, 2004, 2007

The New Zealand Under 19's rugby team was a team for players aged under 19 as a platform to the All Blacks. The New Zealand Under 19's have joined forces with the New Zealand Under 21s to make the new team New Zealand Under 20s for the all new IRB Junior World Championship, which commenced in 2008.

== History ==
New Zealand Under 19 was selected for the first time in 1987, and were strong contenders during their time, having won the IRB Under 19 Rugby World Championship in:

- 1999
- 2001
- 2002
- 2004
- 2007 (Last IRB Under 19 World Championship)

== 2007 Squad ==
Forwards: Ash Dixon; Ben Afeaki; Chris Smith; John Hardie; Josh Townsend; Nasi Manu; Luke Braid; Nick Barrett; Paea Faʻanunu; Peter Saili; Quentin MacDonald; Rodney Ah You; Sam Whitelock; Thomas Crowley	Backs: Daniel Kirkpatrick; Israel Dagg; Jackson Willison; Kade Poki; Matthew Cameron; Robbie Fruean; Ryan Crotty; Sean Maitland; Trent Renata; Wayne Ngaluafe; Winston Stanley; Zac Guildford

== See also ==
- New Zealand national schoolboy rugby union team
- New Zealand national under-20 rugby union team
- New Zealand national under-21 rugby union team
- Junior All Blacks
