= South Africa national under-19 rugby union team =

National under-19 rugby union team

South Africa
- Union: SA Rugby
- Nickname(s): U19 Boks; South Africa U19
- Emblem: Springbok
- Founded: 1994
- Disbanded: IRB in 2007
- Location: South Africa
- Coach: Kevin Foote
- Captain: Riley Norton
- Most appearances: 14 (First in 1994)
- League: U19 World Championship
Team kit	Change kit

First international
- South Africa 48–11 Poland (France, 29 March 1994)

Largest win
- South Africa 93–03 Poland (France, 04 April, 1998)

Largest defeat
- South Africa 03–42 France (United Arab Emirates, 05 April, 2006)

World Cup
- Appearances: 14 (first in 1994)
- Best result: Champions (1994, 2003, 2005)

Union website
- www.sarugby.co.za

== South Africa national under-19 rugby union team ==
The South Africa national under-19 rugby union team (often referred to as South Africa U19) is an age-grade representative rugby union side composed of South African players aged under 19. The team forms part of South Africa's elite player development pathway and serves as a transitional step between school-level rugby and the national under-20 team, known as the Junior Springboks. Players selected for the U19 programme are drawn primarily from domestic youth competitions such as the SA Rugby Under-19 Cup and provincial age-grade structures, and take part in training camps and international tours designed to prepare them for higher levels of competition.

Unlike some other rugby nations, South Africa does not operate a permanently competing under-19 national team. Instead, SA Rugby assembles under-19 academy squads periodically as part of its broader age-grade and high-performance development system.

== History ==
Following World Rugby's restructuring of age-grade competitions in 2008, the former standalone under-19 world championship was discontinued and replaced by a consolidated under-20 international competition. As a result, South Africa no longer maintained a continuously competing under-19 international side. Instead, SA Rugby retained the under-19 level as a developmental and preparatory stage within its national pathway system.

Since that time, under-19 squads have been assembled periodically for specialised training programmes and international tours. These initiatives provide selected players with exposure to international rugby environments and serve as preparation for progression to under-20 competition and professional rugby structures.

In 2025, SA Rugby named a 36-man under-19 academy training group drawn from domestic age-grade competitions. The squad participated in a European development tour, playing fixtures against under-19 teams from France and Ireland. The programme focused on tactical development, squad cohesion, and adapting to international playing styles under the guidance of national high-performance staff.

=== Purpose and pathway ===
The primary purpose of the South Africa under-19 team is developmental. The programme is designed to identify, monitor, and prepare promising young players for progression to the national under-20 team, which competes in the World Rugby Under 20 Championship and the U20 Rugby Championship. Players in the U19 setup typically advance from provincial under-19 competitions and national under-18 school rugby, with standout performers invited to national training camps and academy programmes coordinated by SA Rugby.

=== Selection and notable activities ===
Selection for the South Africa U19 squad is based primarily on performances in domestic age-grade competitions, particularly the SA Rugby Under-19 Cup. The competition features provincial teams such as the Vodacom Bulls, DHL Western Province, Fidelity ADT Lions, Hollywoodbets Sharks, Toyota Cheetahs, and the Leopards. Strong performances at provincial and academy level are a key factor in national under-19 selection.

== 2025 European programme ==
During the latter part of 2025, South Africa's under-19 group undertook a European tour as part of its development programme. The squad played against a French under-19 invitational side and an Ireland under-19 team. The tour was coached by Kevin Foote and included several players who had previously trained within Junior Springbok structures. The programme was regarded as a key preparatory step for players aiming to progress to under-20 international rugby.

=== Relationship to other national teams ===
The South Africa under-19 team sits directly below the national under-20 side, the Junior Springboks, which has competed in international age-grade competitions since 2008 and has won world titles in 2012 and 2025. The under-20 team serves as South Africa's formal representative in global age-grade rugby following the restructuring of international youth competitions.

The under-19 programme also maintains strong links with South Africa's under-18 representative teams, commonly known as the South African Schools. These teams compete in international school-level fixtures and act as a primary feeder system for the national under-19 pathway.

== Rugby World Championship U19 Division A Results ==
=== SA U19 Rugby World Championship ===
*Stats correct as of 9 February 2026

South Africa – U19 Division A record
Year	Host nation	P	W	D	L	PF	PA	Semi-final	Final	Placing
1994	France	3	3	0	0	114	50	Won	Won	Champions
1995	Romania	4	3	0	1	173	56	Lost	Won	Third place
1996	Italy	4	2	0	2	74	47	—	—	Fifth place
1997	Argentina	4	3	1	0	130	53	—	—	Fifth place
1998	France	4	3	1	0	233	48	—	—	Fifth place
1999	Wales	4	3	1	0	101	54	Lost	Won	Third place
2000	France	4	2	0	2	100	104	—	—	Fifth place
2001	Chile	4	3	0	1	144	56	—	—	Fifth place
2002	Italy	4	3	0	1	129	71	Lost	Won	Third place
2003	France	4	4	0	0	111	36	Won	Won	Champions
2004	South Africa	5	3	0	2	161	88	Won	Lost	Third place
2005	South Africa	5	5	0	0	146	61	Won	Won	Champions
2006	United Arab Emirates	5	1	0	4	93	146	—	—	Eighth place
2007	Ireland	5	3	0	2	76	38	Won	Lost	Runner-up
Total		59	41	3	15	1,823	946	—		

Champions
Runners-up
Third place
Home venue

=== SA U19 Division A Head to Head ===
*Stats correct as of 9 February 2026

Opposition	P	W	D	L	% W
France	8	3	0	5	38%
New Zealand	6	2	0	4	33%
England	6	5	0	1	83%
Argentina	6	4	0	2	67%
Ireland	5	3	1	1	70%
Italy	5	5	0	0	100%
Wales	3	0	2	1	33%
Scotland	3	2	0	1	67%
Poland	3	3	0	0	100%
Australia	2	2	0	0	100%
Chile	2	2	0	0	100%
Uruguay	2	2	0	0	100%
Spain	2	2	0	0	100%
Fiji	1	1	0	0	100%
Samoa	1	1	0	0	100%
South Korea	1	1	0	0	100%
Japan	1	1	0	0	100%
Russia	1	1	0	0	100%
Romania	1	1	0	0	100%
Total	59	41	3	15	72%

=== 1994 ===
29 March 1994 (group stage)

South Africa	48 - 11	Poland

France

31 March 1994 (semi final)

South Africa	25 - 21	Italy

France

02 April 1994 (final)

South Africa	41 - 18	Italy

France

=== 1995 ===
10 April 1995 (group stage)

South Africa	61 - 06	Poland

Romania

12 April 1995 (group stage)

South Africa	36 - 14	Spain

Romania

14 April 1995 (semi final)

South Africa	13 - 20	Argentina

Romania

16 April 1995 (3rd place final)

South Africa	63 - 16	Italy

Romania

=== 1996 ===
30 March 1996 (group stage)

South Africa	18 - 09	Chile

Italy

03 April 1996 (group stage)

South Africa	15 - 18	Scotland

Italy

05 April 1996 (5th/8th semi final)

South Africa	34 - 12	Spain

Italy

07 April 1996 (5th place final)

South Africa	07 - 08	France

Italy

=== 1997 ===
24 March 1997 (group stage)

South Africa	46 - 11	Russia

Argentina

26 March 1997 (group stage)

South Africa	16 - 16	Wales

Argentina

28 March 1997 (5th/8th semi final)

South Africa	25 - 15	Romania

Argentina

30 March 1997 (5th place final)

South Africa	43 - 11	Scotland

Argentina

=== 1998 ===
04 April 1998 (group stage)

South Africa	93 - 03	Poland

France

07 April 1998 (quarter finals)

South Africa	17 - 17	Ireland

France

10 April 1998 (5th/8th semi final)

South Africa	71 - 10	Uruguay

France

12 April 1998 (5th place final)

South Africa	52 - 18	Italy

France

=== 1999 ===
26 March 1999 (group stage)

South Africa	31 - 00	Uruguay

Wales

29 March 1999 (quarter finals)

South Africa	33 - 24	France

Wales

01 April 1999 (semi final)

South Africa	10 - 10	Wales

Wales

04 April 1999 (3rd place final)

South Africa	27 - 20	Ireland

Wales

=== 2000 ===
14 April 2000 (group stage)

South Africa	48 - 22	Japan

France

17 April 2000 (quarter finals)

South Africa	05 - 25	France

France

20 April 2000 (5th/8th semi final)

South Africa	32 - 26	Scotland

France

23 April 2000 (5th place final)

South Africa	15 - 31	Ireland

France

=== 2001 ===
06 April 2001 (group stage)

South Africa	53 - 00	Italy

Chile

09 April 2001 (group stage)

South Africa	20 - 34	New Zealand

Chile

12 April 2001 (5th/8th semi final)

South Africa	26 - 10	Argentina

Chile

15 April 2001 (5th place final)

South Africa	45 - 12	England

Chile

=== 2002 ===
21 March 2002 (group stage)

South Africa	48 - 03	Chile

Italy

24 March 2002 (quarter finals)

South Africa	17 - 08	England

Italy

27 March 2002 (semi final)

South Africa	09 - 41	New Zealand

Italy

30 March 2002 (3rd place final)

South Africa	55 - 19	Australia

Italy

=== 2003 ===
10 April 2003 (group stage)

South Africa	50 - 00	South Korea

France

13 April 2003 (quarter finals)

South Africa	19 - 03	England

France

16 April 2003 (semi final)

South Africa	20 - 15	France

France

20 April 2003 (final)

South Africa	22 - 18	New Zealand

France

=== 2004 ===
27 March 2004 (group stage)

South Africa	29 - 06	Argentina

South Africa

31 March 2004 (group stage)

South Africa	59 - 03	Italy

South Africa

04 April 2004 (group stage)

South Africa	12 - 18	France

South Africa

08 April 2004 (semi final)

South Africa	23 - 30	New Zealand

South Africa

12 April 2004 (3rd place final)

South Africa	38 - 31	England

South Africa

=== 2005 ===
01 April 2005 (group stage)

South Africa	62 - 18	Argentina

South Africa

05 April 2005 (group stage)

South Africa	32 - 07	Ireland

South Africa

09 April 2005 (group stage)

South Africa	15 - 09	France

South Africa

13 April 2005 (semi final)

South Africa	17 - 12	England

South Africa

17 April 2005 (final)

South Africa	20 - 15	New Zealand

South Africa

=== 2006 ===
05 April 2006 (group stage)

South Africa	03 - 42	France

UAE

09 April 2006 (group stage)

South Africa	44 - 00	Samoa

UAE

12 April 2006 (group stage)

South Africa	18 - 45	England

UAE

17 April 2006 (5th/8th semi final)

South Africa	21 - 33	Wales

UAE

21 April 2006 (7th place final)

South Africa	07 - 26	Argentina

UAE

=== 2007 ===
05 April 2007 (group stage)

South Africa	36 - 05	Fiji

Ireland

09 April 2007 (group stage)

South Africa	08 - 17	France

Ireland

12 April 2007 (group stage)

South Africa	31 - 05	Ireland

Ireland

17 April 2007 (semi final)

South Africa	32 - 18	Australia

Ireland

21 April 2007 (final)

South Africa	07 - 31	New Zealand

Ireland

== SA U19 International Results ==
=== SA U19 Internationals Head to Head ===
*Stats correct as of 8 February 2026

Opposition	P	W	D	L	% W
France	2	1	0	1	50%
Georgia	2	2	0	0	100%
England	1	1	0	0	100%
Ireland	1	1	0	0	100%
Namibia	1	1	0	0	100%
Total	8	5	0	3	63%

=== 2010 International Series ===
16 July 2010	South Africa	25 - 05	France

20 July 2010	South Africa	27 - 16	Namibia

23 July 2010	South Africa	23 - 17	England

=== 2019 Georgia Tour ===
02 December 2019	Georgia	21 - 28	South Africa

05 December 2019	Georgia	33 - 40	South Africa

=== 2025 Ireland Tour ===
08 November 2025	South Africa	12 - 20	France	Châteauroux, France
	Try: Siphosethu Mnebelele, Kebotile Maake; Con: Vusi Moyo(1)	Report	Try: Edouard Jabea Njocke, Quentin Valentino, Conversions; Con: Luka Keletaona(2); Pen: Luka Keletaona(2)

14 November 2025	Ireland	22 - 32	South Africa	Virgin Media Park, Cork, Ireland
	Try: James O’Leary, Dylan McNeice, Sean Walsh; Con: Conor O’Shauhnessy(2); Pen: Tom Wood(1)	Report	Try: Siphosethu Mnebelele, Mahle Sithole, Penalty Try, Phiwayinkosi Kubheka; Con: Vusi Moyo(2); Pen: Vusi Moyo(2)	Attendance: 8,000

== Players ==
=== Current Squad ===
The following players were named in the South Africa Under-19 squads for 2025:

South Africa Under–19 rugby union team 2025
Name	FRA	IRE	App	Try	Con	Pen	DG	Pts
Oliver Reid	1	1	2	0	0	0	0	0
Siphosethu Mnebelele	2	2	2	2	0	0	0	10
Danie Kruger	3	3	2	0	0	0	0	0
Heinrich Theron	4	4	2	0	0	0	0	0
Riley Norton (c)	5	7	2	0	0	0	0	0
Kebotile Maake	6		1	1	0	0	0	5
Aiden de Costa	7		1	0	0	0	0	0
Reuben Kruger	8		1	0	0	0	0	0
Luan Giliomee	22 (substituted on)	9	2	0	0	0	0	0
Vusi Moyo	10	10	2	0	3	2	0	12
Dylan Miller	11	15	2	0	0	0	0	0
Pieter van der Merwe (vc)	12	12	2	0	0	0	0	0
Khuthadzo Rasivhaga	13	14	2	0	0	0	0	0
Lindsey Jansen	14	11	2	0	0	0	0	0
Akahluwa Boqwana	15	23 (substituted on)	2	0	0	0	0	0
Mahle Sithole	16 (substituted on)	16 (substituted on)	2	1	0	0	0	5
Phiwayinkosi “Rambo” Kubheka	17 (substituted on)	17 (substituted on)	2	1	0	0	0	5
Ulrich van der Merwe	18 (substituted on)	18 (substituted on)	2	0	0	0	0	0
JD Hattingh	19 (substituted on)	5	2	0	0	0	0	0
Tom Barnard	20 (substituted on)	19 (substituted on)	2	0	0	0	0	0
Elgernon Meyer	9		1	0	0	0	0	0
Vuyo Gwiji	21 (substituted on)	8	2	0	0	0	0	0
Brooklyn Newman	25 (substituted on)	22 (substituted on)	2	0	0	0	0	0
Unathi Mlotshwa	26 (substituted on)	20 (substituted on)	2	0	0	0	0	0
Junior Rasima		6	1	0	0	0	0	0

(c) denotes the team captain. Starting players are numbered 1 to 15, while the replacements are numbered 16+. If a replacement made an appearance in the match, it is indicated by (substituted on) . "App" refers to appearances made by the player, "Try" to tries scored, "Con" to conversions, "Pen" to penalties, "DG" to drop goals, and "Pts" to total points scored.

== See also ==
- South Africa national under-20 rugby union team
- South Africa national under-18 rugby union team
- SA Rugby Under-19 Cup
- South African Rugby Union
