= Zimbabwe national under-20 rugby union team =

Zimbabwe
- Union: Zimbabwe Rugby Union
- Coach: Bright Chivandire
- League: IRB Junior World Rugby Trophy
- 2012: 7th

The Zimbabwe national under-20 rugby union team is a junior national side. They finished in 7th place at the 2012 IRB Junior World Rugby Trophy.

== Squad ==
Squad to 2012 IRB Junior World Rugby Trophy

Props: Tyran Fagan; Kuda Makuvire; Ian Muza; Thabani Ndaba; Daleroy Sibanda; Hooker: Gerald Zaina; Locks: Matthew Lawson; Graham Logan; Michael Sinclair; Joshua Smallbones Nigel Furusa	Loose forwards: Tonderai Chigumbura; Tawanda Chowe; Daniel Rorke; Tapiwa Tsomondo; Scrum-halves: Dylan Coetzee; Michael MacIntosh; Robert Sargeant; Fly-halves: James Forrester; Sean Linfield; Tanaka Kangoni	Centres: Taku Chieza; Richard Morkel; Mclean Muhambi; Wings: Joshua Broomberg; Justin Coles; Brian Ndudzo Trevor Chirango; Fullback: Victor Mushoriwa

Jethro Kanogwere

- Team Manager

- Godwin Murambiwa - Assistant Coach
- Gary Hewitt - Assistant Coach
- Margie Gibson - Physiotherapist
- Austin Jeans - Team Doctor
