= Namibia national under-20 rugby union team =

Namibia
- Union: Namibia Rugby Union
- Nickname: Welwitschias
- Emblem: African fish eagle
- Coach: Jood Opperman
Team kit	Change kit

The Namibia'n national under-20 rugby union team represents Namibia at a junior national level.

Namibia participated at the 2014 Junior World Rugby Trophy and finished in 6th place. They qualified for the 2015 Under 20 Trophy after they defeated Kenya 52-17, at the finals of Rugby Africa's Under 19 Championship.

== Current squad ==
Squad to 2014 IRB Junior World Rugby Trophy.

Forwards: Graham April; Stefan De Kerk; Quintin Esterhuizen; G-D Orlam; Thorsten Stahn; Desmond Stramis; Louis van der Westhuizen; DG Wiese; Corne Agenbag; Johan Retief; Janco Venter; Wian Conradie; Immo Dresselhaus; Awie Thompson	Backs: Ascher Coetzee; Wicus Swiegers; JC Winckler; Chris Arries; Malan Kruger; Ethan Beukes; Handre Bezuidenhout; Justin Newman; Reinold Benade; Louis Grobbelaar; Donovan Kandjii; Rudi Pieters

=== Management ===
- Jood Opperman - Head Coach
- Desiré Coetzee - Team Manager
- Roger Thompson - Assistant Coach
- Corne Ferreira - Physiotherapist
- Vernon Morkel - Team Doctor
- Charl Botha - Biomechanist
