= 2018 National Rugby Championship =

- Countries: Australia; Fiji
- Date: 1 September – 27 October
- Champions: Fijian Drua (1st title)
- Runners-up: Queensland Country
- Matches played: 31
- Attendance: 79,400 (average 2,561 per match)
- Highest attendance: 6,000 (Fijian Drua 66-5 Brisbane City) & (Fijian Drua 34-26 Queensland Country)

Official website
- www.rugby.com.au/competitions/nrc

The 2018 National Rugby Championship was the fifth season of the top flight of Australian domestic rugby union. The competition began on 1 September and concluded on 27 October. Matches were broadcast on Fox Sports and the championship featured eight professional teams, seven from Australia and one from Fiji.

The Fijian Drua won their first NRC title, defeating reigning champion side Queensland Country by 36–26 in the grand final held at Churchill Park in Lautoka. The Drua secured home ground advantage in the final by winning the minor premiership for the regular season and then beating Canberra Vikings in their semifinal. Queensland Country defeated the Western Force in the other semifinal to progress to the grand final. Fijian Drua also finished the season as winners of the Horan-Little Shield for 2018.

== Teams ==
There were two major changes for the 2018 season. The Greater Sydney Rams team was removed from the competition, leaving New South Wales with two participating sides in the NRC, one Sydney team and one Country team. In Perth, the Western Force replaced Perth Spirit as the team in Western Australia, following the removal of the Force from the Super Rugby competition in 2018. The eight teams for the 2018 NRC season include two from New South Wales, two from Queensland, and one each from Australian Capital Territory, Victoria, Western Australia, and Fiji:

| Region | Team | Coach | Captain | Ref |
|---|---|---|---|---|
| Australian Capital Territory | Canberra Vikings | Nick Scrivener | Ben Hyne | |
| Fiji | Fijian Drua | Senirusi Seruvakula | Mosese Voka | |
| New South Wales | NSW Country Eagles | Darren Coleman | Paddy Ryan | |
| New South Wales | Sydney Rays | Chris Whitaker | Damien Fitzpatrick | |
| Queensland | Brisbane City | Mick Heenan | Adam Korczyk | |
| Queensland | Queensland Country | Rod Seib | Duncan Paia'aua | |
| Victoria | Melbourne Rising | Eoin Toolan | Angus Cottrell | |
| Western Australia | Western Force | Tim Sampson | Ian Prior | |

== Television coverage and streaming ==
Two of the NRC matches each weekend are broadcast live via Fox Sports, with the remaining matches shown live on the Fox Sports streaming platform. Discussion of the NRC competition is included on the Fox Sports review show NRC Extra Time on Monday nights, and the Kick & Chase program on Wednesday evenings.

== Experimental Law Variations ==
World Rugby adopted all global law variations being trialled as of May 2018 into the rugby law book with immediate effect. As such, the NRC 2017 trial changes to Laws 15, 16 and 20 (renumbered as 14, 15 and 19 in the simplified 2018 laws) were officially incorporated by World Rugby and thus became variations no more. The other law variations used for the NRC in 2017 were retained for the 2018 season.

NRC Law Variations 2018

| Existing Law of the Game | Variation |
|---|---|
| Television Match Official / Global law trial: Law 5: 15. A match organiser may appoint a television match official (TMO), who uses technological devices to clarify situations relating to: 1. The grounding of the ball in in-goal.; 2. Touch or touch-in-goal in the act of grounding the ball or the ball being made dead.; 3. Where there is doubt as to whether a kick at goal has been successful.; 4. Where match officials believe an infringement may have occurred in the playing area leading to a try or preventing a try.; 5. Foul play, including sanctions.; 16. Any of the match officials, including the TMO, may recommend a review by the TMO. The reviews will take place in accordance with the TMO protocol. | Television match official to only be consulted about tries and in-goal plays. |
| Conversion: Law 8: 8. (d) [The kicker] takes the kick within 90 seconds (playing time) from the time the try was awarded, even if the ball rolls over and has to be placed again.; Sanction: Kick is disallowed. | Time limit reduced to 60 seconds for conversion kicks. |
| Penalty goal: Law 8: 21. The kick must be taken within 60 seconds (playing time) from the time the team indicated their intention to do so, even if the ball rolls over and has to be placed again.; Sanction: Kick is disallowed and a scrum is awarded. | Time limit reduced to 45 seconds for penalty kicks. |
| During a maul: Law 16: 8. The ball-carrier in a maul may go to ground provided that player makes the ball available immediately. Sanction: Scrum.; 9. All other players in a maul must endeavour to stay on their feet.; 10. All players in a maul must be caught in or bound to it and not just alongside it.; 11. Players must not: 1. Intentionally collapse a maul or jump on top of it.; 2. Attempt to drag an opponent out of a maul.; Sanction: Penalty. | Greater policing of this law, in order to discourage "hold up tackles", by ensuring that the tackler, who holds up a ball carrier in an effort to form a maul, does not collapse the maul as soon as it has formed. |
| Quick throw: Law 18: 5. A quick throw is disallowed and a lineout is awarded to the same team if: 1. A lineout had already been formed; or 2. The ball had been touched after it went into touch by anyone other than the player throwing in or the player who carried the ball into touch; or 3. A different ball is used from the one that originally went into touch. | Players will be allowed to take quick throw-ins regardless of whether someone else has touched the ball |
| Location of a penalty or free kick: Law 20: 2. A penalty or free-kick is taken from where it is awarded or anywhere behind it on a line through the mark and parallel to the touchlines. When a penalty or free-kick is taken at the wrong place, it must be re-taken. | Increased latitude will be given to where penalty and free kicks are to be taken |
| Competition rule - Bonus point awarded for scoring 4 tries | Bonus point awarded if a winning team scores at least 3 more tries than its opponent. This particular system was first used in the French professional leagues during the 2007–08 northern hemisphere season. |

== Regular season ==
The eight teams competed in a round-robin tournament for the regular season. During this section of the competition, teams also played for the Horan-Little Shield, a challenge trophy put on the line when a challenge is accepted by the holders or mandated by the terms of competition for the shield.

Points for the regular season standings were accumulated by the same method as for The Rugby Championship and Super Rugby. A slightly modified version of the standard competition points system was used, with a bonus point awarded to a winning team scoring at least 3 tries more than their opponent; and a bonus point awarded to a losing team defeated by a margin of 7 points or under. Four points were awarded for a win and none for a loss; two points were awarded to each team if a match was drawn.

Each team's placement was based on its cumulative points total, including any bonus points earned. For teams level on table points, tiebreakers apply in the following order:

1. Difference between points for and against during the season.
2. Head-to-head match result(s) between the tied teams.
3. Total number tries scored during the season.

The top four teams at the end of the regular season qualified for the title play-offs in the form of semi-finals followed by a final to determine the champion team.

=== Standings ===
National Rugby Championship
| # | Team | P | W | D | L | PF | PA | PD | TB | LB | Pts |
|---|---|---|---|---|---|---|---|---|---|---|---|
| 1 | Fijian Drua HL | 7 | 6 | 0 | 1 | 283 | 175 | +108 | 3 | 0 | 27 |
| 2 | Queensland Country | 7 | 5 | 0 | 2 | 299 | 211 | +88 | 3 | 1 | 24 |
| 3 | Western Force | 7 | 5 | 0 | 2 | 284 | 202 | +82 | 2 | 1 | 23 |
| 4 | Canberra Vikings | 7 | 5 | 0 | 2 | 221 | 169 | +52 | 1 | 1 | 22 |
| 5 | Brisbane City | 7 | 4 | 0 | 3 | 205 | 245 | −40 | 1 | 1 | 18 |
| 6 | Melbourne Rising | 7 | 2 | 0 | 5 | 239 | 192 | +47 | 2 | 3 | 13 |
| 7 | NSW Country Eagles | 7 | 1 | 0 | 6 | 140 | 280 | −140 | 0 | 2 | 6 |
| 8 | Sydney Rays | 7 | 0 | 0 | 7 | 167 | 364 | −197 | 0 | 1 | 1 |
Updated: 14 October 2018 Source: rugbyarchive.net • Teams 1 to 4 (Green background) at the end of the regular season rounds qualify for the title playoffs. HL denotes the holder of the Horan-Little Shield.

=== Team progression ===
National Rugby Championship progression
| Team | Round 1 | Round 2 | Round 3 | NSW Derby (Note: Round 1 match for NSW teams played at a later date due to Shute Shield Final.) | Round 4 | Round 5 | Round 6 | Round 7 |
|---|---|---|---|---|---|---|---|---|
| Brisbane City | 0 (7th) | 0 (8th) | 5 (6th) | 5 (6th) | 9 (5th) | 13 (5th) | 17 (5th) | 18 (5th) |
| Canberra Vikings | 0 (6th) | 5 (4th) | 9 (3rd) | 9 (3rd) | 13 (3rd) | 17 (3rd) | 18 (4th) | 22 (4th) |
| Fijian Drua | 5 (1st) | 10 (1st) | 10 (2nd) | 10 (2nd) | 14 (1st) | 19 (1st) | 23 (1st) | 27 (1st) |
| Melbourne Rising | 0 (8th) | 1 (5th) | 6 (5th) | 6 (5th) | 7 (6th) | 7 (6th) | 8 (6th) | 13 (6th) |
| NSW Country Eagles | 0 (4th) | 0 (6th) | 0 (8th) | 4 (7th) | 5 (7th) | 5 (7th) | 6 (7th) | 6 (7th) |
| Queensland Country | 4 (3rd) | 8 (3rd) | 13 (1st) | 13 (1st) | 14 (2nd) | 14 (4th) | 19 (3rd) | 24 (2nd) |
| Sydney Rays | 0 (4th) | 0 (7th) | 0 (7th) | 0 (8th) | 1 (8th) | 1 (8th) | 1 (8th) | 1 (8th) |
| Western Force | 4 (2nd) | 9 (2nd) | 9 (4th) | 9 (4th) | 13 (4th) | 18 (2nd) | 22 (2nd) | 23 (3rd) |
The table above shows a team's progression throughout the season. For each round, their cumulative points total is shown with the overall log position in brackets.
| Key: | win | draw | loss | bye | | | | |

=== Competition rounds ===
All times are local (and subject to change).

==== Round 1 ====
| 1 September | Fijian Drua | 40–17 | Melbourne Rising | Ratu Cakobau Park, Nausori |
| 3.00 pm FJT | Try: Kurumudu 29' c Veitokani 34' c Waqatabu 41', Vularika 60' c Dyer 62' c, Daveta 76' c Con: Waqatabu (5/6) 30', 36', 61', 63', 77' | | Try: English (2) 27' c, 80+2'; Marsters 55'; Con: Goddard (1/1) 28'; King (0/1); K. Valetini (0/1) | Attendance: 5,000; Referee: Damon Murphy |

| 1 September | Canberra Vikings | 35–45 | Queensland Country | Viking Park, Canberra |
| 5.00 pm AEST | Try: F. Fainga'a (3) 16' c, 62' c, 72' c, Taliauli 21' c Muirhead 45' c Con: Hawera (2/2) 18', 22'; Jackson-Hope (3/3) 46', 63', 72' | | Try: Casey (2) 5' c, 40+1'; Campbell (2) 12' c, 32' c Blyth 48' c, Timu 59' c Puli'uvea 75' c Con: Tuttle (3/5) 6', 34', 49'; Stewart (2/2) 60', 76' | Attendance: 1,000; Referee: Nic Berry |

| 2 September | Brisbane City | 29–47 | Western Force | Norths Rugby Club, Brisbane |
| 3.00 pm AEST | Try: Foley 7' c Thompson-Te Muunu 16'; Morret 28', Cooper 51' c Ngamanu 62'; Con: Cooper (2/6) 8', 52'; Cards: Waqavulagi (YC) 34'; Sooaemalelagi (YC) 68' | | Try: Davies (2) 4', 44' c Kaitu'u (2) 57' c, 69' c Thrush 11' c McGregor 32' c, C. Orr 37' c Con: Prior (6/7) 12', 33', 38', 45', 58', 70' | Attendance: 4,500; Referee: Jordan Way |

| 19 September | Sydney Rays | 19–33 | NSW Country Eagles | Leichhardt Oval, Sydney |
| 7.00 pm AEST | Try: Rona 20', Vui 36' c Sinclair 76' c Con: Harrison (1/2) 37'; Burey (1/1) 77'; Cards: C. Betham (YC) 10' | | Try: Gordon (3) 11' c, 63' c, 71'; Newsome 18' c, Latu 34' c Con: Mason (4/5) 12', 19', 34', 64'; Cards: Meafou (YC) 25'; C. Talakai (YC) 80' | Attendance: 1,100; Referee: Angus Gardner |

==== Round 2 ====
| 8 September | Fijian Drua | 66–5 | Brisbane City | Churchill Park, Lautoka |
| 3.00 pm FJT | Try: Kurumudu (3); 13' c, 39' c, 57' c Lomani (2) 21' c, 48' c Radrodro 10' c Waqatabu 23' c Reece 51' c, Voka 77'; Naqali 80+1'; Con: Waqatabu (8/10) 12', 14', 21', 24', 40', 49', 52', 58' | | Try: Ngamanu 68'; Con: Cooper (0/1) | Attendance: 6,000; Referee: Jordan Way |

| 8 September | Sydney Rays | 17–54 | Canberra Vikings | Concord Oval, Sydney |
| 3.00 pm AEST | Try: Latunipulu 18' c Duffy 69'; Burey 76'; Con: Harrison (1/1) 20'; Duffy (0/2) | | Try: McInerney (2) 1' c, 6' c Taliauli (2) 14' c, 60'; Penalty Try 32'; Lonergan 43' c, Hansen 51' c Jackson-Hope 80' c Con: Hawera (6/7) 2', 8', 16', 45', 53', 80+2'; Cards: M. Oakman-Hunt (YC) 70' | Attendance: 750; Referee: Damon Murphy |

| Horan-Little Challenge | 9 September | Western Force | 54–28 | NSW Country Eagles | UWA Sports Park, Perth |
| | 1.00 pm AWST | Try: Brache (2) 1' c, 17' c Dakuwaqa (2) 25' c, 40' c Alcock 38' c, H. Orr 74'; Penalty Try 77'; Davies 80+4'; Con: Prior (5/6) 3', 18', 27, 40', 41', P. Grant (1/1) 80+5' | | Try: Newsome 30' c Ryan 44' c Latunipulu 61' c Holloway 70' c Con: Mason (4/4) 31', 44', 62', 71'; Cards: Mason (YC) 78' | Attendance: 5,000; Referee: James Quinn |

| 9 September | Queensland Country | 29–28 | Melbourne Rising | Hugh Street Rugby Grounds, Townsville |
| 3.00 pm AEST | Try: Tuttle 4', Blyth 34' c, Campbell 43'; Fittock 51', Maafu 62' c Con: Tuttle (1/3) 35'; Stewart (1/2) 62' | | Try: Ruru (2) 24' c, 29' c King 49' c Naisarani 77'; Con: King (3/3) 26', 30', 50'; K. Valetini (1/1) 78' | Attendance: 2,000; Referee: Aaron Pook |

==== Round 3 ====
| 15 September | NSW Country Eagles | 7–62 | Melbourne Rising | Glen Willow Regional Sports Stadium, Mudgee |
| 1.00 pm AEST | Try: Snowden 77' c Con: Mason (1/1) 77'; Cards: Graham (YC) 41'; A. Latunipulu (YC) 48' | | Try: English (5) 13' c, 23', 29' c, 46' c, 48'; Ratu (2) 33', 69' c Ruru 38' c, Marsters 58' c Meakes 67'; Con: King (6/10) 14', 14', 30', 39', 47', 58', 70' | Attendance: 1,700; Referee: Will Houston |

| 15 September | Queensland Country | 52–22 | Fijian Drua | BB Print Stadium, Mackay |
| 1.00 pm AEST | Try: Petaia (3) 9' c, 24', 32' c Campbell (2) 21' c, 28'; Paia'aua 14' c Daugunu 51' c, Wilson 80' c Con: Stewart (6/8) 10', 15', 22', 33', 52', 80+1' | | Try: Daveta 2'; Penalty Try 38'; Waqatabu 49'; Nauma 72'; Con: Veitokani (0/2); Waqatabu (0/1) | Attendance: 1,200; Referee: Craig Maxwell-Keys |

| 15 September | Sydney Rays | 40–61 | Brisbane City | Woollahra Oval, Sydney |
| 3.00 pm AEST | Try: Vui 17' c Fitzpatrick 29'; Palmer 47' c, Short 73' c Clements 78' c Harrison 80+2' c Con: Kane (5/6), 18', 48', 74', 79' 80+2'; Cards: Vui (YC) 27' | | Try: Maranta (2), 8' c, 22' c Wallis (2), 34' c, 42' c Gordon (2) 36' c, 75'; Cooper 14' c, Penalty Try 27'; McReight 63'; Con: Cooper (6/8), 9', 16', 24', 35', 37', 43', 77'; Cards: Cooper (YC) 50' | Attendance: 500; Referee: Graham Cooper |

| 16 September | Canberra Vikings | 29–19 | Western Force | Viking Park, Canberra |
| 3.00 pm AEST | Try: Muirhead (2) 4' c, 61'; Jackson-Hope 21' c Hawera 66' c Con: Hawera (3/4) 6', 23', 67'; Pen: Hawera (1/1) 32' | | Try: Alcock 19' c Taefu 36' c Stander 40'; Con: Prior (2/3) 20', 38' | Attendance: 2,000; Referee: Jordan Way |

==== Round 4 ====
| 22 September | Melbourne Rising | 28–33 | Brisbane City | AA Bailey Reserve, Adelaide |
| 12.30 pm ACST | Try: King 5' c Meakes 13' c S. Tuipulotu 23' c Ruru 54' c Con: King (4/4) 6' 13' 23' 54'; Cards: Noa (YC) 40+3' | | Try: Tasi (2) 43' c, 62'; Foley 18' c Thompson-Te Muunu 51' c Hunt 59' c Con: Cooper (4/5) 19' 44' 52' 60'; Pen: Cooper (0/1) | Attendance: 2,250; Referee: Graham Cooper |

| 22 September | Queensland Country | 40–42 | Western Force | Bond University, Gold Coast, Gold Coast |
| 3.00 pm AEST | Try: Paia'aua 15'; McDermott 36' c, Campbell 40' c Finefueaki 43' c Petaia 54' c, Kibble 70' c Con: Stewart (5/6) 36' 40+2'; 44' 55' 71'; Cards: Slipper (YC) 20' | | Con: Davies (2) 11' c, 63' c Brache (2) 22' c, 30' c Dakuwaqa 51' c McGregor 75' c Pen: Prior (6/6) 12' 23' 31'; 51' 63' 76' | Attendance: 2,000; Referee: Nic Berry |

| 23 September | NSW Country Eagles | 17–24 | Canberra Vikings | Bellevue Oval, Armidale |
| 1.00 pm AEST | Try: Penalty Try 13', Newsome 35' c Con: Mason (1/1) 36'; Pen: Mason (1/1) 65' | | Try: Valetini 52' c, Taliauli 60' c, Jackson-Hope 80+2' c, Con: Hawera (3/3) 54' 61' 80+3'; Pen: Hawera (1/1) 79'; Cards: Taula (YC) 10' | Attendance: 2,000; Referee: Damon Murphy |

| 23 September | Sydney Rays | 31–34 | Fijian Drua | Concord Oval, Sydney |
| 3.00 pm AEST | Try: Rona (2) 28' c, 80+1' c Vest 5'; Davis 12' c Buaserau 43'; Con: Burey (3/5) 13', 29', 80+2 | | Try: Veitokani (2) 35', 74' c Waqatabu (2) 56', 76' c Reece 50', Tuisue 64'; Con: Waqatabu (2/3) 75', 77'; Vularika (0/2); Cards: Daveta (YC) 42' | Attendance: 3,500; Referee: Craig Maxwell-Keys |

==== Round 5 ====
| 29 September | Fijian Drua | 48–7 | NSW Country Eagles | Ratu Cakobau Park, Nausori |
| 3.00 pm FJT | | | | Attendance: 2,500 |

| 29 September | Canberra Vikings | 31–21 | Melbourne Rising | Viking Park, Canberra |
| 7.00 pm AEST | | | | Attendance: 600 |

| 30 September | Brisbane City | 39–24 | Queensland Country | Sci Fleet Stadium, Brisbane |
| 3.00 pm AEST | | | | Attendance: 3,000 |

| Horan-Little Challenge | 30 September | Western Force | 63–15 | Sydney Rays | UWA Sports Park, Perth |
| | 3.00 pm AWST | | | | Attendance: 2,500 |

==== Round 6 ====
| 6 October | Fijian Drua | 40–35 | Canberra Vikings | Churchill Park, Lautoka |
| 3.00 pm FJT | | | | Attendance: 5,000 |

| 6 October | Queensland Country | 64–24 | Sydney Rays | Bond University, Gold Coast |
| 3.00 pm AEST | | | | Attendance: 1,000 |

| Horan-Little Challenge | 7 October | Melbourne Rising | 28–31 | Western Force | GMHBA Stadium, Geelong |
| | 2.30 pm AEDT | | | | Attendance: 1,500 |

| 7 October | NSW Country Eagles | 27–28 | Brisbane City | Camden Rugby Club, Camden |
| 3.00 pm AEDT | | | | Attendance: 1,000 |

==== Round 7 ====
| 13 October | NSW Country Eagles | 21–45 | Queensland Country | Scully Park, Tamworth |
| 3.00 pm AEDT | | | | Attendance: 1,300 |

| Horan-Little Challenge | 13 October | Western Force | 28–33 | Fijian Drua | UWA Sports Park, Perth |
| | 2.00 pm AWST | | | | Attendance: 4,500 |

| 14 October | Melbourne Rising | 55-21 | Sydney Rays | St Patrick's College Main Oval, Ballarat |
| 1.00 pm AEDT | | | | Attendance: 500 |

| 14 October | Brisbane City | 10-13 | Canberra Vikings | Bottomley Park, Brisbane |
| 2.00 pm AEST | | | | Attendance: 2,500 |

== Title playoffs ==
Semi-finals
1 | Fijian Drua | 35
4 | Canberra Vikings | 28
2 | Queensland Country | 45
3 | Western Force | 24

Final
1 | Fijian Drua | 36
2 | Queensland Country | 26

=== Semi-finals ===
| 20 October | Fijian Drua | 35–28 | Canberra Vikings | Churchill Park, Lautoka |
| 3.00 pm FJT | | | | Attendance: 5,000 |

| 21 October | Queensland Country | 45–24 | Western Force | Bond University, Gold Coast, Gold Coast |
| 3.00 pm AEST | | | | Attendance: 2,000 |

=== Final ===
| Horan-Little Challenge | 27 October | Fijian Drua | 36–26 | Queensland Country | Churchill Park, Lautoka |
| | 2.30 pm FJT | Try: Tuisue (2) 33' c, 50' c Radrodro 10' c Naulago 20'; Veitokani 60' c Con: Waqatabu (4/5) 11', 34', 51', 61'; Pen: Veitokani (1/1) 79'; Malele (0/1) | | Try: Feauai-Sautia 4'; Petaia 29' c Daugunu 52' c Maafu 68' c Con: Stewart (3/4) 30', 53, 70' | Attendance: 6,000; Referee: Nic Berry (Australia) |

| Fijian Drua | Queensland Country |

Team details

| FB | 15 | Apisalome Waqatabu | (substituted off) 62' |
| RW | 14 | Levani Kurumudu |
| OC | 13 | Apisalome Vota |
| IC | 12 | Cyril Reece |
| LW | 11 | Aporosa Tabulawaki | (substituted off) 57' |
| FH | 10 | Alivereti Veitokani |
| SH | 9 | Frank Lomani | (substituted off) 72' |
| N8 | 8 | Eremasi Radrodro |
| OF | 7 | Jone Navori | (substituted off) 54' |
| BF | 6 | Mosese Voka (c) |
| RL | 5 | Albert Tuisue |
| LL | 4 | Peni Naulago | (substituted off) 55' |
| TP | 3 | Benji Makutu | (substituted off) 43' |
| HK | 2 | Mesulame Dolokoto | (substituted off) 58' |
| LP | 1 | Joeli Veitayaki Jr | (substituted off) 55' |
Replacements:
| HK | 16 | Ratunaisa Navuma | (substituted on) 58' |
| PR | 17 | Eroni Mawi | (substituted on) 55' |
| PR | 18 | Luke Tagi | (substituted on) 43' |
| LK | 19 | Tevita Naqali | (substituted on) 55' |
| FL | 20 | Johnny Dyer | (substituted on) 54' |
| SH | 21 | Peni Matawalu | (substituted on) 72' |
| FH | 22 | Enele Malele | (substituted on) 62' |
| OB | 23 | Avete Daveta | (substituted on) 58' |
Coach:
Senirusi Seruvakula

| FB | 15 | Jock Campbell |
| RW | 14 | Filipo Daugunu |
| OC | 13 | Jordan Petaia |
| IC | 12 | Duncan Paia'aua |
| LW | 11 | Chris Feauai-Sautia | (substituted off) 73' |
| FH | 10 | Hamish Stewart |
| SH | 9 | Tate McDermott | (substituted off) 75' |
| N8 | 8 | Caleb Timu |
| OF | 7 | Tom Kibble | (substituted off) 64' |
| BF | 6 | Angus Scott-Young |
| RL | 5 | Angus Blyth | (substituted off) 77' |
| LL | 4 | Harry Hockings |
| TP | 3 | Kirwan Sanday | (substituted off) 63' |
| HK | 2 | Efi Ma'afu | (substituted off) 75' |
| LP | 1 | James Slipper | (substituted off) 41' |
Replacements:
| HK | 16 | Richie Asiata | (substituted on) 75' |
| PR | 17 | Harry Hoopert | (substituted on) 41' |
| PR | 18 | Jake Simeon | (substituted on) 63' |
| LK | 19 | Rob Puli'uvea | (substituted on) 77' |
| LF | 20 | Harry Wilson | (substituted on) 64' |
| SH | 21 | Harry Nucifora | (substituted on) 75' |
| FH | 22 | Tom Lucas | (substituted on) 73' |
| OB | 23 | Patrick James |
Coach:
Rod Seib

Man of the Match:
TBC

Assistant Referees:
Jordan Way (Australia)
Aaron Pook (Australia)
Television match official:
Tevita Rokovereni (Fiji)

== Statistics ==
=== Leading point scorers ===
| No. | Player | Team | Points | Average | Details |
|---|---|---|---|---|---|
| 1 | Apisalome Waqatabu | Fijian Drua | 91 | 10.11 | 7 T, 28 C, 0 P, 0 D |
| 2 | Ian Prior | Western Force | 78 | 9.75 | 1 T, 35 C, 1 P, 0 D |
| 3 | Hamish Stewart | Queensland Country | 71 | 7.89 | 1 T, 30 C, 2 P, 0 D |
| 4 | Quade Cooper | Brisbane City | 63 | 9.00 | 3 T, 21 C, 2 P, 0 D |
| 4 | Archie King | Melbourne Rising | 63 | 9.00 | 3 T, 24 C, 0 P, 0 D |

=== Leading try scorers ===
| No. | Player | Team | Tries | Average |
|---|---|---|---|---|
| 1 | Jordan Petaia | Queensland Country | 10 | 1.11 |
| 2 | Tom English | Melbourne Rising | 9 | 1.29 |
| 3 | Levani Kurumudu | Fijian Drua | 8 | 0.89 |
| 4 | Jock Campbell | Queensland Country | 7 | 0.78 |
| 4 | Apisalome Waqatabu | Fijian Drua | 7 | 0.78 |

== 2018 Emerging States Championship ==
From 2018 an additional competition was formed for teams from so-called "Emerging States", featuring the Adelaide Black Falcons, Victoria Country Barbarians, Northern Territory Mosquitoes and Tasmania Jack Jumpers. The first Competition was held in Adelaide in September 2018, and the Black Falcons were the inaugural winners.
