= 2017 National Rugby Championship =

- Date: 2 September – 11 November
- Champions: Queensland Country (1st title)
- Runners-up: Canberra Vikings
- Matches played: 39
- Attendance: 78,500 (average 2,013 per match)
- Highest attendance: 8,000 (Fijian Drua vs. Perth Spirit)

Official website
- www.rugby.com.au/competitions/nrc

The 2017 National Rugby Championship was the fourth season of Australia's National Rugby Championship. It involved nine professional rugby union teams, one more than the previous year, with eight teams from Australia and one team from Fiji.

The two leading teams in the regular season, Canberra Vikings and Queensland Country, went on to play in the championship final. The deciding match, played at Viking Park in Canberra, was won 42–28 by Queensland Country to claim their first NRC title.

== Teams ==
A major change made for the 2017 season was the inclusion of the Fijian Drua in the competition. Fijian Prime Minister Frank Bainimarama met with the Australian Rugby Union, and World Rugby earlier in the year about establishing a pathway for developing Fijian rugby players. World Rugby financed the Fijian Drua.

The nine teams for the season included three from New South Wales, two from Queensland, and one each from Australian Capital Territory, Victoria, Western Australia, and Fiji:

Region	Team	Coach(es)	Captain(s)	Refs
FJI	Fijian Drua	(Fiji) Senirusi Seruvakula	(Fiji) John Stewart	
ACT	Canberra Vikings	(Australia) Tim Sampson	(Australia) Tom Cusack	
NSW	NSW Country Eagles	(Australia) Darren Coleman	(Australia) Paddy Ryan	
NSW	Greater Sydney Rams	(Australia) John Manenti	(Australia) Jed Holloway	
NSW	Sydney Rays	(Australia) Julian Huxley	(Australia) Damien Fitzpatrick	
QLD	Brisbane City	(Australia) Mick Heenan	(Australia) Andrew Ready	
QLD	Queensland Country	(New Zealand) Brad Thorn	(Australia) Duncan Paia'aua	
VIC	Melbourne Rising	(Australia) Zane Hilton	(Australia) Steve Cummins	
WA	Perth Spirit	(South Africa) Kevin Foote	(New Zealand) Michael Ruru	

Home match venues scheduled for the 2017 NRC season:

Region	Team	Match Venue	Capacity	City
FJI	Fijian Drua	Churchill Park	18,000	Lautoka
FJI	Fijian Drua	Lawaqa Park	12,000	Sigatoka
FJI	Fijian Drua	National Stadium	15,000	Suva
ACT	Canberra Vikings	Viking Park	8,000	Canberra
NSW	NSW Country Eagles	Bellevue Oval	3,000	Armidale
NSW	NSW Country Eagles	Simon Poidevin Oval	3,000	Goulburn
NSW	NSW Country Eagles	Wade Park	8,000	Orange
NSW	NSW Country Eagles	Scully Park	11,000	Tamworth
NSW	Greater Sydney Rams	TG Millner Field	8,000	Sydney
NSW	Sydney Rays	Macquarie University	3,000	Sydney
NSW	Sydney Rays	Pittwater Park	10,000	Sydney
QLD	Brisbane City	Ballymore	18,000	Brisbane
QLD	Brisbane City	UQ Rugby Club	3,000	Brisbane
QLD	Brisbane City	Wests Bulldogs	3,000	Brisbane
QLD	Queensland Country	Bond University, Gold Coast	5,000	Gold Coast
QLD	Queensland Country	North Ipswich Reserve	5,500	Ipswich
QLD	Queensland Country	Noosa Dolphins Club	3,000	Noosa
QLD	Queensland Country	Sports Ground	9,000	Toowoomba
VIC	Melbourne Rising	Holmesglen Reserve	3,000	Melbourne
VIC	Melbourne Rising	Frankston Park	8,000	Melbourne
WA	Perth Spirit	UWA Rugby Club	4,000	Perth

== Television coverage and streaming ==
Two of the NRC matches each weekend were broadcast live via Fox Sports, with the remaining matches shown on the Fox Sports streaming platform. Discussion of the NRC competition was included on Fox Sports' review show NRC Extra Time on Monday nights, and the Kick & Chase program on Tuesday evenings.

== Experimental Law Variations ==
The trialed changes to the point scoring system adopted in previous years were not continued for the 2017 NRC season, and scoring reverted to the standard values of five points for a try, two for a conversion and three for a penalty or drop goal.

The remaining law variations used in 2016 were retained for the 2017 season. Also adopted were World Rugby's six amendments to the program of trial laws for 2017, relating to the tackle/ruck (Law 15.4 (c), 16, and 16.4 variations) and scrum (Law 20, 20.5 (d), and 20.9 (b) variations).

NRC Law Variations 2017

Existing Law of the Game	Variation
Law 5.7(e); If time expires and the ball is not dead, or an awarded scrum or lineout has not been completed, the referee allows play to continue until the next time that the ball becomes dead. The ball becomes dead when the referee would have awarded a scrum, lineout, an option to the non-infringing team, drop out or after a conversion or successful penalty kick at goal. If a scrum has to be reset, the scrum has not been completed. If time expires and a mark, free kick or penalty kick is then awarded, the referee allows play to continue.	Non-offending team is allowed to kick the ball into touch after being awarded a penalty kick, which has been blown after time expires, and the lineout will take place.
Law 9.B.1(e); The kicker must take the kick within one minute and thirty seconds (ninety seconds) from the time a try has been awarded. The player must take the kick within one minute and thirty seconds even if the ball rolls over and has to be placed again.	Time limit reduced to 60 seconds for conversion kicks, and 45 seconds for penalty kicks.
Law 15.4 (c); The tackler must get up before playing the ball and then may play the ball from any direction. Sanction: Penalty kick	The tackler must get up before playing the ball and then can only play from their own side of the tackle "gate". Rationale: To make the tackle/ruck simpler for players and referees and more consistent with the rest of that law.
Law 16; Definitions; A ruck is a phase of play where one or more players from each team, who are on their feet, in physical contact, close around the ball on the ground. Open play has ended. Players are rucking when they are in a ruck and using their feet to try to win or keep possession of the ball, without being guilty of foul play.	A ruck commences when at least one player is on their feet and over the ball which is on the ground (tackled player, tackler). At this point the offside lines are created. Players on their feet may use their hands to pick up the ball as long as this is immediate. As soon as an opposition player arrives, no hands can be used.
Law 16.4; Other ruck offences	A player must not kick the ball out of a ruck. The player can only hook it in a backwards motion.
Law 17.2(d); Keeping players on their feet. Players in a maul must endeavour to stay on their feet. The ball carrier in a maul may go to ground providing the ball is available immediately and play continues.	Greater policing of this law, in order to discourage "hold up tackles", by ensuring that the tackler, who holds up a ball carrier in an effort to form a maul, does not collapse the maul as soon as it has formed.
Law 19.2(d); For a quick throw-in, the player must use the ball that went into touch. A quick throw-in is not permitted if another person has touched the ball apart from the player throwing it in and an opponent who carried it into touch. The same team throws into the lineout.	Players will be allowed to take quick throw-ins regardless of whether someone else has touched the ball
Law 19.6; The player taking the throw-in must stand at the correct place. The player must not step into the field of play when the ball is thrown. The ball must be thrown straight, so that it travels at least 5 metres along the line of touch before it first touches the ground or touches or is touched by a player.	Latitude will be given to the throwing team if the opposing team does not compete for the ball near where the ball is received
Law 20; Definitions... A scrum is formed in the field of play when eight players from each team, bound together in three rows for each team, close up with their opponents so that the heads of the front rows are interlocked. This creates a tunnel into which a scrum half throws the ball so that front row players can compete for possession by hooking the ball with either of their feet ...	Once the ball touches the ground in the tunnel, any front-row player may use either foot to try to win possession of the ball. One player from the team who put the ball in must strike for the ball. Rationale: To promote a fair contest for possession. Sanction: Free-kick
Law 20.5(d); Throwing the ball into the scrum No Delay. As soon as the front rows have come together, the scrum half must throw in the ball without delay. The scrum half must throw in the ball when told to do so by the referee. The scrum half must throw in the ball from the side of the scrum first chosen. Sanction: Free Kick	No signal from referee. The scrum-half must throw the ball in straight, but is allowed to align their shoulder on the middle line of the scrum, therefore allowing them to stand a shoulder width towards their own side of the middle line. Rationale: To promote scrum stability, a fair contest for possession while also giving the advantage to the team throwing in.
Law 20.9 (b); All players: Handling in the scrum. Players must not handle the ball in the scrum or pick it up with their legs. Sanction: Penalty kick	The number eight shall be allowed to pick the ball from the feet of the second-rows. Rationale: To promote continuity.
Law 21.2(a); The kicker must take the penalty or free kick at the mark or anywhere behind it on a line through the mark.	Increased latitude will be given to where penalty and free kicks are to be taken
Competition rule - Bonus point awarded for scoring 4 tries	Bonus point awarded if winning team scores 3 or more tries than their opponents. This particular system has been used in France's professional leagues since the 2007–08 northern hemisphere season.
Television match official protocols	Television match official to only be consulted about tries and in-goal plays.

== Regular season ==
The nine teams played in a round-robin for the regular season, each team having four matches at home and four away. The top four teams qualified for the semi-finals with the respective winner meeting in the final.

During this section of the competition, teams also played for the Horan-Little Shield, a challenge trophy put on the line when a challenge is accepted by the holders or mandated by the terms of competition for the shield.

Points for the regular season standings were accumulated by the same method as for The Rugby Championship and Super Rugby. A slightly modified version of the standard competition points system was used, with a bonus point awarded to a winning team scoring at least 3 tries more than their opponent; and a bonus point awarded to a losing team defeated by a margin of 7 points or under. Four points were awarded for a win and none for a loss; two points were awarded to each team if a match was drawn.

Each team's placement was based on its cumulative points total, including any bonus points earned. For teams level on table points, tiebreakers apply in the following order:

1. Difference between points for and against during the season.
2. Head-to-head match result(s) between the tied teams.
3. Total number tries scored during the season.

The top four teams at the end of the regular season qualified for the title play-offs in the form of semi-finals followed by a final to determine the champion team.

=== Standings ===
National Rugby Championship
Pos	Team	P	W	D	L	PF	PA	PD	TB	LB	Pts
1	Canberra Vikings	8	6	0	2	353	186	+167	3	2	29
2	Queensland Country	8	6	0	2	316	204	+112	4	1	29
3	Fijian Drua	8	4	0	4	261	245	+16	4	2	22
4	Perth Spirit HL	8	4	0	4	269	237	+32	2	2	20
5	NSW Country Eagles	8	4	1	3	219	217	+2	1	1	20
6	Brisbane City	8	4	1	3	281	291	–10	2	0	20
7	Greater Sydney Rams	8	3	0	5	248	319	–71	1	0	13
8	Sydney Rays	8	3	0	5	238	322	–84	1	0	13
9	Melbourne Rising	8	1	0	7	193	357	–164	0	0	4
Updated: 29 October 2017 Source: rugbyarchive.net • Teams 1 to 4 (Green background) at the end of the preliminary competition rounds qualify for the Title play-offs. HL denotes the holder of the Horan-Little Shield.

=== Competition rounds ===
All kick-offs listed are in local time.

==== Round 1 ====
2 September 2017	Canberra Vikings	48–40	Queensland Country	Viking Park, Canberra
15:00 AEST	Try: Robinson, Banks, Muirhead, Abel, Hyne, Powell, Penders; Con: Hawera 4 Pen: Hawera		Try: Paia’aua 2, Timu, Tuttle, Scott-Young, Faagase; Con: Tuttle 4	Attendance: 1,500; Referee: Graham Cooper

2 September 2017	Brisbane City	45–36	Fijian Drua	Ballymore, Brisbane
15:00 AEST	Try: Ready, Fidow 3, Tui, Gunn, Kerevi; Con: Cooper 4, Alatimu		Try: Nacebe 2, Voka, Sau, Cavuilati, Reece; Con: Douglas 2, Nacebe; Cards: Yellow Cards: Mudu, Tawake	Attendance: 3,200; Referee: Damon Murphy

Horan-Little Challenge	3 September 2017	Greater Sydney Rams	44–23	NSW Country Eagles	TG Millner Field, Sydney
	15:00 AEST	Try: Grant, Ale, Pili-Gaitau, Tuisue, Naiyaravoro, Fuavao; Con: Mason 4 Pen: Mason 2		Try: Adams 2, Kagiassis; Con: Adams; Pen: Adams 2	Attendance: 1,000; Referee: Angus Gardner

3 September 2017	Perth Spirit	45–33	Melbourne Rising	UWA Rugby Club, Perth
15:00 AWST	Try: Naisarani, Faulkner 2, Cowan, Peni, Brache, Verity-Amm; Con: Lance 5		Try: Tuipulotu, Koroibete 2, McGregor, Maddocks; Con: McGregor 4	Attendance: 4,000; Referee: Will Houston

Bye/s: Sydney Rays

==== Round 2 ====
9 September 2017	Queensland Country	31–12	Brisbane City	Dolphins RU Club, Noosa
13:00 AEST				Attendance: 2,000

9 September 2017	Melbourne Rising	24–45	Fijian Drua	Harlequin Oval, Melbourne
15:00 AEST				Attendance: 2,000

10 September 2017	Canberra Vikings	33–26	Perth Spirit	Viking Park, Canberra
13:00 AEST				Attendance: 500

Horan-Little Challenge	10 September 2017	Sydney Rays	26–41	Greater Sydney Rams	Macquarie Uni, Sydney
	15:00 AEST				Attendance: 1,500

Bye/s: NSW Country Eagles

==== Round 3 ====
16 September 2017	Fijian Drua	31–14	NSW Country Eagles	Lawaqa Park, Sigatoka
15:00 FJT				Attendance: 4,000+

16 September 2017	Sydney Rays	48–28	Melbourne Rising	Pittwater Park, Sydney
15:00 AEST				Attendance: 500

17 September 2017	Brisbane City	42–40	Canberra Vikings	UQ Rugby Club, Brisbane
13:00 AEST				Attendance: 2,300

17 September 2017	Perth Spirit	61–17	Greater Sydney Rams	UWA Rugby Club, Perth
13:00 AWST				Attendance: 2,000

Bye/s: Queensland Country

==== Round 4 ====
23 September 2017	NSW Country Eagles	25–24	Canberra Vikings	Bellevue Oval, Armidale
13:00 AEST				Attendance: 2,200

23 September 2017	Fijian Drua	41–5	Perth Spirit	ANZ Stadium, Suva
17:00 FJT				Attendance: 8,000+

24 September 2017	Sydney Rays	24–50	Queensland Country	Pittwater Park, Sydney
13:00 AEST				Attendance: 700

24 September 2017	Melbourne Rising	41–31	Greater Sydney Rams	Harlequin Oval, Melbourne
15:00 AEST				Attendance: 1,000

Bye/s: Brisbane City

==== Round 5 ====
29 September 2017	Canberra Vikings	66–5	Fijian Drua	Viking Park, Canberra
19:30 AEST				Attendance: 2,000

30 September 2017	Queensland Country	54–12	Melbourne Rising	Bond University, Gold Coast, Gold Coast
15:00 AEST				Attendance: 1,200

1 October 2017	Perth Spirit	62–28	Brisbane City	UWA Rugby Club, Perth
14:00 AWST				Attendance: 2,000

2 October 2017	NSW Country Eagles	26–17	Sydney Rays	Simon Poidevin Oval, Goulburn
15:00 AEDT				Attendance: 1,000

Bye/s: Greater Sydney Rams

==== Round 6 ====
Pasifika Round

Horan-Little Challenge	7 October 2017	Greater Sydney Rams	31–57	Fijian Drua	TG Millner Field, Sydney
	15:00 AEDT				Attendance: 4,000

7 October 2017	Queensland Country	34–31	NSW Country Eagles	Bond University, Gold Coast, Gold Coast
16:00 AEST				Attendance: 1,000

8 October 2017	Melbourne Rising	12–36	Canberra Vikings	Frankston Park, Frankston
13:00 AEDT				Attendance: 1,000

8 October 2017	Sydney Rays	29–46	Brisbane City	Pittwater Park, Sydney
15:00 AEDT				Attendance: 1,500

Bye/s: Perth Spirit

==== Round 7 ====
14 October 2017	Greater Sydney Rams	31–57	Queensland Country	TG Millner Field, Sydney
13:00 AEDT				Attendance: 500

14 October 2017	NSW Country Eagles	15–10	Perth Spirit	Scully Park, Tamworth
15:00 AEDT				Attendance: 500

15 October 2017	Canberra Vikings	71–14	Sydney Rays	Viking Park, Canberra
14:30 AEDT				Attendance: 1,700

15 October 2017	Brisbane City	51–24	Melbourne Rising	Wests Bulldogs, Brisbane
16:00 AEST				Attendance: 1,000

Bye/s: Fijian Drua

==== Round 8 ====
Horan-Little Challenge	21 October 2017	Fijian Drua	17–24	Queensland Country	Churchill Park, Lautoka
	14:00 FJT		Report		Attendance: 6,000; Referee: Graham Cooper

21 October 2017	Brisbane City	19–31	Greater Sydney Rams	Ballymore Stadium, Brisbane
14:00 AEST		Report		Attendance: 1,100; Referee: Nic Berry

21 October 2017	Perth Spirit	31–44	Sydney Rays	UWA Rugby Club, Perth
14:00 AWST		Report		Attendance: 2,100; Referee: Angus Gardner

22 October 2017	Melbourne Rising	19–47	NSW Country Eagles	Harlequin Oval, Melbourne
14:30 AEDT	Try: Ratu, Hutchison, Maddocks; Con: McGregor 2	Report	Try: Gibbon 3, Freier, Gordon, Wileman, Gibbon, Paenga-Amosa; Con: Adams 6	Attendance: 1,000; Referee: Will Houston

Bye/s: Canberra Vikings

==== Round 9 ====
28 October 2017	NSW Country Eagles	38–38	Brisbane City	Wade Park, Orange
13:00 AEDT				Attendance: 1,500

28 October 2017	Fijian Drua	29–36	Sydney Rays	ANZ Stadium, Suva
16:00 FJT				Attendance: 3,000

29 October 2017	Greater Sydney Rams	22–35	Canberra Vikings	TG Millner Field, Sydney
15:00 AEDT				Attendance: 500

Horan-Little Challenge	29 October 2017	Queensland Country	26–29	Perth Spirit	Qld Group Stadium, Ipswich
	16:00 AEST				Attendance: 1,000

Bye/s: Melbourne Rising

== Finals ==
The top four sides in the regular season advanced to the semifinals of the knock-out stage, which was followed by the final to decide the National Rugby Championship title.

Semi-finals
1	(Australian Capital Territory) Canberra Vikings	40
4	(Western Australia) Perth Spirit	35
2	Queensland Country	57
3	(Fiji) Fijian Drua	21

Final
(Australian Capital Territory) Canberra Vikings	28
Queensland Country	42

=== Semi-finals ===
4 November 2017	Canberra Vikings	40–35	Perth Spirit	Viking Park, Canberra
16:00 AEDT	Try: Valetini 24' c Sione 31' c, Muirhead 34' c Lloyd 56' c, Banks 67' m Hawera 71' c Con: Hawera (5/6) 25', 32', 36', 57', 72'	Report	Try: Arnold (3) 3' c, 28' c, 40+2' c Rangi 46' c Malolo 74' c Con: Grant (5/5) 4', 29', 40+3', 47', 74'; Cards: Koteka (yellow card) 69' to 79'	Attendance: 1,500; Referee: Damon Murphy

5 November 2017	Queensland Country	57–21	Fijian Drua	Sports Ground, Toowoomba
14:00 AEST	Try: Timu (2) 5' c, 28' c Paia'aua (2) 17' c, 72' m Tupou (2) 37' m, 59' c Feauai-Sautia 43' c James 49' m, Nabuli 78' c Con: Tuttle (5/8) 6', 18', 29', 44', 60'; Daugunu (1/1) 79'	Report	Try: Rarawa (3) 34' c, 36' c, 53' c Con: Waqatabu (3/3) 35', 47, 54'; Cards: Tawake (yellow card) 26' to 36'; Mawi (yellow card) 65' to 75'	Attendance: 3,000; Referee: Will Houston

=== Final ===
11 November 2017	Canberra Vikings	28–42	Queensland Country	Viking Park, Canberra
19:30 AEDT	Try: Dargaville 25' c, Lloyd 33' c, Valetini 37' c, Taliauli 67' c Con: Hawera (4/4) 25', 34', 38', 68'	Details; Report	Try: Tuttle 20' c, Daugunu (3) 43' c, 53' c, 77' c, Paia'aua (2) 57' c, 75' c Con: Tuttle (6/6) 21', 44', 54', 58', 76', 78'; Cards: Paia'aua (yellow card) 65' to 75'	Attendance: 4,000; Referee: Will Houston

Canberra Vikings	Queensland Country

Team details

FB	15	Tom Banks
RW	14	Ben Johnston
OC	13	Len Ikitau	(substituted off) 64'
IC	12	James Dargaville
LW	11	Andy Muirhead
FH	10	Wharenui Hawera
SH	9	Ryan Lonergan	(substituted off) 64'
N8	8	Lolo Fakaosilea
OF	7	Tom Cusack
BF	6	Rob Valetini
RL	5	Darcy Swain
LL	4	Dean Oakman-Hunt
TP	3	Leslie Leulua’iali’i-Makin	(substituted off) 79'
HK	2	Folau Fainga'a	(substituted off) 68'
LP	1	Harrison Lloyd	(substituted off) 61'
Replacements:
HK	16	Robbie Abel	(substituted on) 68'
PR	17	Faalelei Sione	(substituted on) 61'
PR	18	Max Bode	(substituted on) 79'
LK	19	Michael Oakman-Hunt
FL	20	Angus Allen
SH	21	Pedro Rolando	(substituted on) 64'
FH	22	Liam Moseley
OB	23	Lausii Taliauli	(substituted on) 64'
Coach:
Tim Sampson

FB	15	Patrick James
RW	14	Filipo Daugunu
OC	13	Chris Feauai-Sautia
IC	12	Duncan Paia'aua
LW	11	Eto Nabuli
FH	10	Hamish Stewart
SH	9	James Tuttle
N8	8	Caleb Timu
OF	7	Tainui Ford	(substituted off) 66'
BF	6	Angus Scott-Young
RL	5	Angus Blyth
LL	4	Harry Hockings
TP	3	Taniela Tupou
HK	2	Alex Mafi
LP	1	Richie Asiata
Replacements:
HK	16	Alex Casey
PR	17	Gareth Ryan
PR	18	Gavin Luka
LK	19	Phil Potgieter
LF	20	Ted Postal	(substituted on) 66'
SH	21	Tate McDermott
FH	22	Teti Tela
OB	23	Tony Hunt
Coach:
Brad Thorn

Man of the Match:
Duncan Paia'aua

Assistant Referees:
Damon Murphy (Australia)
Jordan Way (Australia)
Television match official:
Ian Smith (Australia)
