= Brad Thorn =

Australia rugby league & NZ rugby union international footballer

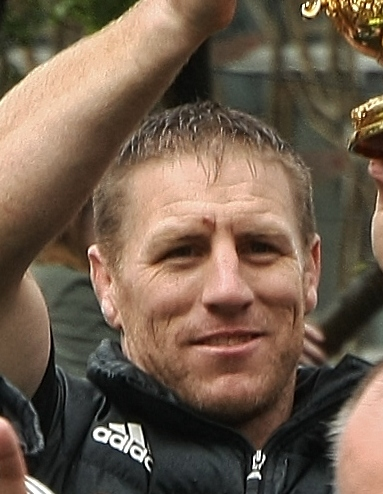

Personal information
- Full name: Bradley Carnegie Thorn
- Born: 3 February 1975 (age 51) Mosgiel, Otago, New Zealand

Playing information
- Height: 195 cm (6 ft 5 in)
- Weight: 114 kg (251 lb; 17 st 13 lb)

Rugby league
- Position: Second-row, Prop
Club
Years	Team	Pld	T	G	FG	P
1994–00	Brisbane Broncos	130	22	0	0	88
2005–07	Brisbane Broncos	71	10	0	0	40
	Total	201	32	0	0	128
Representative
Years	Team	Pld	T	G	FG	P
1996–05	Queensland	11	1	0	0	4
1997	Queensland (SL)	3	0	0	0	0
1997	Australia (SL)	5	1	0	0	4
1998	Australia	3	2	0	0	8

Rugby union
- Position: Lock
Club
Years	Team	Pld	T	G	FG	P
2001–04, 08–11	Crusaders	92	11	0	0	55
2001–04, 08–10	Canterbury	30	4	0	0	20
2008	Tasman	1	0	0	0	0
2011–12	Sanix Blues	10	0	0	0	0
2012	Leinster	8	0	0	0	0
2013–14	Highlanders	16	1	0	0	5
2014–15	Leicester	12	1	0	0	5
2016	Queensland Country	2	0	0	0	0
	Total	171	17	0	0	85
Representative
Years	Team	Pld	T	G	FG	P
2003–11	New Zealand	59	4	0	0	20

Coaching information
Club
Years	Team	Gms	W	D	L	W%
2017–2018	Queensland Country	10	8	0	2	80
2018–2023	Queensland Reds	93	42	1	50	45
	Total	103	50	1	52	49

Bradley Carnegie Thorn (born 3 February 1975) is an Australian and New Zealand rugby union coach and former rugby league and rugby union player. Born in New Zealand, he represented Australia in rugby league and New Zealand in rugby union in a twenty-two year career as a player, starting at age nineteen and finishing at age forty-one. He was the head coach of the Queensland Reds in Super Rugby Pacific.

Thorn played rugby league for the Brisbane Broncos in the National Rugby League (NRL) and Super League for ten seasons across two spells, winning four grand finals, and represented Queensland in the State of Origin series. He played eight times for Australia – five for the Kangaroos, and three for the Super League Australia team. His usual position in rugby league was in the second-row, and he sometimes played as a prop. In 2000 Thorn was awarded the Australian Sports Medal for his contribution to Australia's international standing in rugby league.

He first moved to rugby union in 2001, in his mid-twenties, and played as a lock. Over two spells in the sport, he became the first player to win a World Cup, a Super Rugby title and the Heineken Cup. He won 59 international caps for New Zealand, and was part of the team that won the 2011 Rugby World Cup. Thorn is the oldest player to play in the final of a World Cup and win it, aged 36 years, 262 days.

== Early and personal life ==
Thorn was born in Mosgiel, just outside Dunedin in south-eastern Otago. When Thorn was five years old, his family moved to south-central Otago (Cromwell/Bannockburn). (Note: Sources differ as to whether Thorn resided in Bannockburn or Cromwell, which are roughly five kilometres apart. However, Thorn's family did reside in that area and Thorn was educated in the same locations.) Moving again, Thorn’s family left for Brisbane, Queensland, Australia when he was nine years old, and he was educated at Aspley East State School and Aspley State High School.

Growing up in the northern suburbs of Brisbane, Thorn played junior rugby league for Norths Aspley and Wests Arana Panthers. By the age of 12, Thorn had stopped playing rugby league in favour of pursuing a career in Australian rules football (AFL) and was showing promising signs when he was selected to represent the Queensland under-12 state team before a chance meeting with Wayne Bennett at 13 years of age convinced him to return to rugby league.

With the help of Kangaroos teammate Jason Stevens, Thorn became a born-again Christian in 1998. Thorn stated to The Times: “I do feel now I have purpose, believe there is a God that loves me. I want be a good father and husband and in a footy context give my best.” In 2011, Thorn said “I had money, a car, a house – I thought these things would make me happy. But once I got there and got all these things, I still felt unfulfilled. I felt empty ... it was only when I put my faith in Jesus that life changed for me.”

== Rugby league career ==
=== Brisbane Broncos ===
==== 1994–2000 ====
Thorn made his first grade debut in the NSWRL for the Brisbane Broncos, who were then defending premiers, in the 1994 Winfield Cup season's 12th round against the Canterbury Bulldogs. At season's end he won the club's rookie of the year award.

At the outbreak of the Super League war in 1995 Thorn, along with the rest of his Broncos teammates and players of several other clubs, was aligned with Super League and so ineligible for selection in the Australian Rugby League's 1995 State of Origin series or post-season 1995 Rugby League World Cup. The following year, when all players were again allowed to be selected for representative football, Thorn's debut for the Queensland Maroons came in Game I of the 1996 State of Origin series. He held his place at second-row forward for all three games of that series.

In the 1997 Super League season Thorn played in all three games for Queensland in that year's Super League Tri-series. He also made his international debut for Australia against New Zealand. Thorn won his first premiership with the Broncos when they defeated the Cronulla Sharks in the 1997 Super League grand final in Brisbane. In the 1997 post season, Thorn was selected to travel to England and play for Australia at prop forward in all three matches of the Super League Test series against Great Britain, scoring a try in the third and deciding test victory. It was on this tour that his front-row partner Jason Stevens helped convince Thorn to convert to Christianity.

Following the sport's re-unification under the National Rugby League, Thorn was selected in Game II of the 1998 State of Origin series. He also continued to represent Australia in all three Tests of the 1998 international series against New Zealand. Thorn also played at second-row forward in the Broncos' victory at the 1998 NRL Grand Final, winning his second premiership ring.

Thorn was selected to play for Queensland again in Game III of 1999 State of Origin series and all three matches of the 2000 State of Origin series. He then played at second-row forward for the Broncos in their 2000 NRL Grand Final win over the Sydney Roosters, claiming a third premiership.

==== 2005–2007 ====
In 2005 Thorn moved back to Brisbane and the National Rugby League, again playing with the Broncos for another three years. He enjoyed further representative selection for Queensland in all three games of the 2005 State of Origin series, scoring a try in Game II.

Thorn claimed another premiership ring when he played at second-row in the Broncos' 2006 NRL Grand Final victory over the Melbourne Storm. As 2006 NRL Premiers, the Broncos travelled to England to face 2006 Super League champions, St Helens in the 2007 World Club Challenge. Thorn played at second-row forward in the Broncos' 14–18 loss.

During the 2007 NRL season at the Broncos' 20-year anniversary celebration, the club announced a list of the 20 best players to play for them to date which included Thorn. At the close of the 2007 NRL season Thorn switched codes once again, moving back to New Zealand to continue his rugby union career.

== Rugby union career ==
=== 2001–2004 ===
In 2001 Thorn moved to New Zealand and switched to rugby union, playing for the Crusaders in the Super 12 and Canterbury in the National Provincial Championship. He was part of the Canterbury squad that won the NPC in 2001. He had initially been picked for the end of year All Black tour in 2001 but he pulled out due to his own uncertainty of commitment to the 15-man game. In 2003, Thorn went on to play for New Zealand's All Blacks, appearing in 12 tests, including the 2003 Rugby Union World Cup. He thus became a dual rugby-code international, the second man in history (after Bill Hardcastle) to have represented Australia in league and New Zealand in union. In 2004 Thorn won the NPC with Canterbury. He also won the Tri-Nations with NZ in 2003.

=== 2008–2016 ===
Thorn signed with Tasman Rugby Union in October, 2007, making him again eligible for the Crusaders. He won the Super 14 competition with the Crusaders in 2008 against the Waratahs in superb style with a 20–12 win. He thus became the second person to win both a Super Rugby title and an NRL title. This feat was first achieved by Peter Ryan for the Brisbane Broncos in 1998 and the Brumbies in 2001, and since Thorn, only by former Crusaders teammate Sonny Bill Williams and Queensland Reds/Melbourne Storm player Will Chambers in 2012. After his contribution to the Crusaders, Thorn was selected for the All Blacks to play the first test of 2008 against Ireland in Wellington. He won a second Tri-Nations with New Zealand in 2008 and a third in 2010.

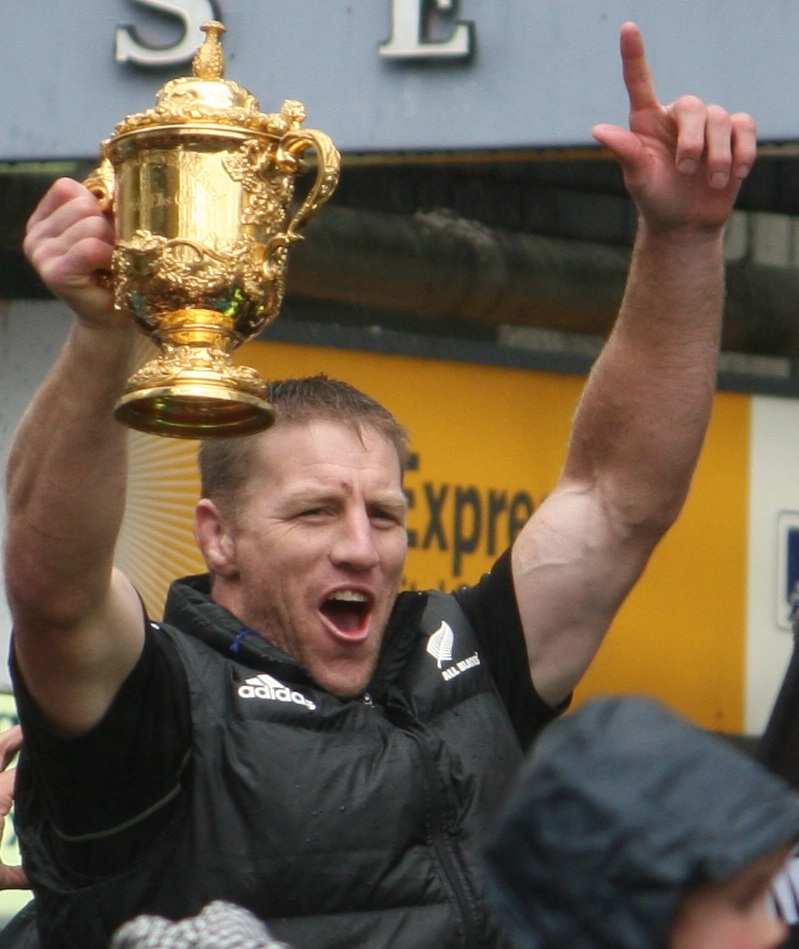
Thorn with the William Webb Ellis Cup

During the 2011 Super Rugby season, Thorn signed a deal to join Japanese club Fukuoka Sanix Blues in the Japanese Top League after the Rugby World Cup. On 23 October 2011, Thorn was part of the All Blacks team which won the Rugby World Cup 2011, beating France 8–7 in the Final.

In March 2012, during the Japanese off season, Thorn signed a 3-month short-term contract with European champions Leinster. Leinster went on to win the 2012 Heineken Cup and Thorn started at lock in the final. Achieving this title meant Thorn was the first player to win a World Cup, a Super Rugby title and the Heineken Cup. He has since been joined in this feat by Bakkies Botha, Danie Rossouw and Bryan Habana.

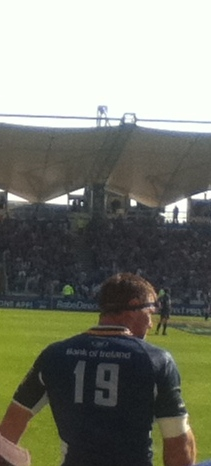
Brad Thorn appearing as a substitute for Leinster during the 2012 Pro12 Final

In October 2012, it was reported that Thorn has agreed in principle to join the Highlanders Super rugby franchise for the 2013 season. Thorn would be joining the Dunedin-based franchise with incoming World Cup final teammates Ma'a Nonu and Tony Woodcock both of whom were joining from the Blues in Auckland.

On 4 May 2013 against the Sharks in Dunedin Thorn played his 100th Super rugby game.

In 2014 a bicep injury which required surgery ended his season and called into question whether Thorn would be able to reach his stated goal of playing rugby union professionally until age 40. However, in August 2014, Thorn decided to extend his career once again, signing a deal with English club Leicester Tigers.

On 8 April 2015, Thorn announced that he would retire at the end of the 2014–15 season.

In 2016, Thorn came out of retirement, aged 41, and played for Queensland Country in Australia's National Rugby Championship.

=== Playing longevity ===
Thorn's extended playing career - 22 seasons as a professional - has been attributed to his professional approach, including focuses on stretching, listening to his body, and doing only light weights when he felt that was right for him. Thorn is known for his strength and his dedication to weight training throughout his career.

== Coaching career ==
=== Queensland ===
In May 2015 Thorn was revealed to be a newly appointed “Development/Forwards coach” of the Australian Super Rugby team, the Queensland Reds, starting in late 2015. His appointment was scheduled in preparation for the following season (2016). Following his appointment, Thorn held that he wasn't actually retired from playing and that if the Queensland Reds needed him to play, he'd be available: “There's always an urge. I didn't actually retire – I'm just playing less now ... If things were like dire straits, I'm happy to help out any way I can, but I think things are under control at the moment.” In 2016 it was also revealed that Thorn would be the assistant of one of the Queensland-based National Rugby Championship (NRC) teams, Queensland Country. While in the role with Queensland Country, Thorn was selected and played in two of their matches (round five, round six).

Before the start to the 2017 National Rugby Championship season, Thorn was announced as the new head coach of Queensland Country. Thorn's first season as the head coach of a rugby union team was very successful. With Queensland Country finishing the regular season second on the ladder, gaining a finals spot, the seasons success included a six win-streak from rounds two to round eight. The regular season also included Queensland Country winning the Horan-Little Shield for the first time. The team only held the trophy for one round however, as they lost at home to Perth Spirit the following week. In the first week of finals, the Queensland Country were placed against the Fijian Drua, whom were playing in their first NRC season. The Queensland Country had beaten the Drua just 15 days prior to their finals encounter. Queensland Country dominated the fixture overwhelmingly (winning 57–21), and, it stands as the second-largest finals victory by margin in the NRC's history.

==== 2018–2019 ====
With the Queensland Reds finishing fourteenth (of eighteen), and Brad Thorn having won his first trophy as a coach (and the first NRC title for Queensland Country), Thorn was appointed coach of the Queensland Reds in October 2017. Thorn was joined by Paul Carozza as second-in-command one month later, his assistant at Queensland Country. Scott Higginbotham was named team captain.

Thorn's first season as coach of the Reds (2018), although an improvement compared to prior seasons, was mediocre and inadequate. The Reds finished thirteenth on the overall standings (in front of only the Blues and the Sunwolves) and was the lowest-placed Australian team. Although Thorn's debut match as coach was a thumping loss to the Melbourne Rebels (45–19), Thorn's Reds went on a three-match win-streak beating the Brumbies 18–10 at home, the Bulls 20–14 at home, and the Jaguares 7–18 away. This initial successive start to the season under Thorn was a stark difference from previous years under the likes of Richard Graham, Matt O'Connor and Nick Stiles. Indeed, not since April 2013 did the Reds manage to string three consecutive wins together. Following the Reds' stoic win over the Jaguares in Buenos Aires, they were sitting fourth on the overall standings. Unfortunately that brief success to the start of the season was overturned as the Reds lost four-straight matches, sitting thirteenth overall after ten rounds. For the remainder of the season the Reds won three and lost five to finish the season in thirteenth with six wins and ten losses. The Queensland Reds were not the only Australian side to have a poor season. In fact, the 2018 Super Rugby season saw the New South Wales Waratahs as the only Australian team to finish in a finals position.

The following season (2019) saw better defence from the Reds, however they finished with the same points total and wins than the previous season. The Reds' win record was sporadic and often inconsistent. Throughout the entire season the Reds never finished above ninth.

==== 2020–2021 ====
After the break-up of the Super Rugby competition following-on from the COVID-19 pandemic in 2020, the Reds were competing in the newly created Super Rugby AU for the 2020 and 2021 seasons. With two highly successful seasons in the new competition, Thorn coached the Reds to runner-up in the 2020 season, and to the 2021 championship, defeating the ACT Brumbies. This was Thorn's second trophy as a rugby union coach, the trophies being 3 years, 178 days between each other. The Reds were back to normalcy after resuming in the re-arranged Super Rugby Pacific for 2022.

==== 2022–2023 ====
The 2022 season has been the most successful season for Brad Thorn in a multi-country style Super Rugby competition. And the Reds were going in as Super Rugby AU champions. Indeed, the first four rounds were victorious for the Reds, beating all Australian other than the Brumbies in round five. The Reds won the next three matches and by the conclusion of the tenth round the Reds were sitting fourth overall (second-placed Australian team overall). The Reds won one match for the remainder of the season, finishing seventh overall. In the first finals series fixture the Reds lost to the Crusaders 37–15.

In April 2023, Thorn confirmed he will finish as coach of the Queensland Reds at the conclusion of the 2023 Super Rugby Pacific season.

==== 2024 ====
Thorn was appointed as an assistant head coach of the Brisbane Boys' College 1st XV.

==== 2025 ====
Thorn was announced as the new forwards coach of the Malta National Team on 15th September 2025.

=== Coaching statistics ===
Coaching stats as head coach
Team	Comp.	Season	Matches				
Team	Comp.	Season	P	W	D	L	%
Queensland Country	National Rugby Championship	2017	10	8	0	2	80.00
Queensland Reds	Super Rugby (Note: Includes seasons in the Super Rugby AU and the Super Rugby Trans-Tasman.)	2018	16	6	0	10	37.50
Queensland Reds	Super Rugby	2019	16	6	0	10	37.50
Queensland Reds	Super Rugby	2020 (AU)	17	8	1	8	47.06
Queensland Reds	Super Rugby	2021 (TT)	14	9	0	5	64.29
Queensland Reds	Super Rugby	2022	15	8	0	7	53.33
Queensland Reds	Super Rugby	2023	15	5	0	10	33.33
Queensland Reds Total			93	42	1	50	45.16

== Honours ==
=== Rugby league ===
Brisbane Broncos

- Super League title 1997
- 1997 World Club Championship
- NRL titles in 1998, 2000, and 2006

State of Origin

- 14 appearances for Queensland
- State of Origin titles with Queensland, 1998 and 1999

Kangaroos

- Eight Tests Matches for Australia

=== Rugby union ===
Canterbury

- NPC titles 2001 and 2004
- Ranfurly Shield holder

Crusaders

- 2008 Super Rugby title
- Combined 100 Super Rugby appearances with the Crusaders and Highlanders

New Zealand

- Bledisloe Cup 2003, 2008, 2009, 2010 and 2011
- Tri-Nations titles 2003, 2008 and 2010 (Undefeated in 2003 and 2010)
- Grand Slam 2008 and 2010
- 2011 Rugby World Cup champion
- 59 Test Matches for the All Blacks with a winning ratio of 86.44%

Leinster

- 2012 Heineken Cup title

=== Awards ===
- Brisbane Broncos, 1994 Rookie of the Year
- Brisbane Broncos award for Best Forward, 1997, 2000 and 2006
- Brisbane Broncos award for Most Consistent, 2005
- Brisbane Broncos award for Defence Play of the Year, 2007
- Identified as one of the Broncos' 20 best players to play for the club
- Australian Sports Medal for his contribution to Australia's international standing in rugby league
- Nominee for the 2010 New Zealand Rugby Player of the Year (the Kelvin R Tremain Memorial Trophy)
