= Marley Brown Oval =

Playing field in Clinton, Queensland

- Interactive map of Marley Brown Oval
- Location: 1 Harvey Road, Clinton, QLD (Gladstone)
- Coordinates: 23.8782927°S 151.2220835°E
- Capacity: 6,000 total (1,000 seated)
- Surface: Grass

Marley Brown Oval is a playing field located in the suburb of Clinton in the regional Queensland city of Gladstone. The field was named in honour of local rugby league identity Marley Brown who had died a year before the venue opened, with the first rugby league game played at Marley Brown Oval in 1976.

The Gladstone Leagues Club located at the ground opened in 1988, and a 1000-seat grandstand was constructed in 1995.

In 2017, it was announced Marley Brown Oval would benefit from state government funding, as part of the Works 4 Queensland program. The funding will be used to expand the amenities, make it more inclusive for female rugby league players and upgrade the venue to an NRL standard.

Marley Brown Oval was chosen to host its first NRL game in April 2018. The decision to host an NRL game in Gladstone came about due to the Gold Coast Titans needing to temporarily relocate their home games, including the Round 5 match against the Manly Warringah Sea Eagles, due to the 2018 Commonwealth Games being held on the Gold Coast.

Queensland Country hosted Brisbane City at Marley Brown Oval for the National Rugby Championship annual City-Country match in September 2019.
