= Tim Sampson =

Australian rugby union player & coach

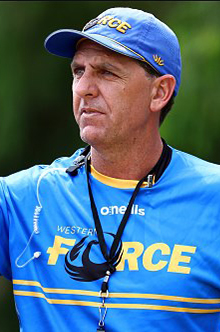
- Full name: Fijian Drua
- Born: May 23, 1976 (age 50) Sydney, Australia

Rugby union career
- Position: Assistant coach
- Current team: Fijian Drua
Senior career
Years	Team	Apps	(Points)
1997–2007	Sunnybank	150	
2003–2004	Wanderers F.C.		
2007	Tornadoes	8	(5)
Provincial / State sides
Years	Team	Apps	(Points)
1999–2003	Queensland	4	
Coaching career
- Years: Team
- 2011-2015: Easts Tigers (Assistant Coach/Head Coach)
- 2015–2017: Tuggeranong Vikings (Director of Rugby/Head Coach)
- 2017–2018: Canberra Vikings (Head Coach)
- 2018–2022: Western Force (Head Coach)
- 2022-2024: Melbourne Rebels (Assistant Coach)
- 2024-: Fijian Drua (Assistant Coach)

Tim Sampson (born 23 May 1976) is an Australian professional rugby union football coach. He is currently an assistant coach of the Fijian Drua team that plays in the Super Rugby Pacific competition, and was previously the head coach of the Western Force.

As a player, Sampson represented Queensland and won two premierships with Sunnybank in Brisbane playing as a fly-half or inside centre.

== Rugby career ==
Sampson played for the Sunnybank club for more than a decade. He represented Queensland on four occasions including a match against the touring England team in 1999 with a young Jonny Wilkinson in their lineup. He also played for the Dublin-based club Wanderers F.C. in Ireland.

Sunnybank won the Queensland Premier Rugby title for the first time in 2005. That season Sampson won the XXXX Medal for Queensland Premier Rugby player of the year, jointly with his Sunnybank teammate James Sua. He captained Sunnybank to their second premiership two years later in 2007.

Sampson was recruited to the Ballymore Tornadoes for the Australian Rugby Championship in 2007 where he played all eight of the team's matches. He retired from playing at the end of that season to take up an assistant coaching position with Sunnybank.

== Coaching career ==
=== Queensland Premier Rugby ===
After retiring as a player in 2007, Sampson swiftly entered coaching by becoming an Assistant Coach at Sunnybank Rugby Club from 2008-2010. During this period, Sampson also travelled to Japan as a coaching consultant for the Kamaishi Seawaves throughout the 2008 and 2009 seasons.

In 2011, Sampson then joined Easts Rugby Club in the Queensland Premier Rugby competition as an Assistant Coach, winning the Premiership in 2013. In 2014 Sampson worked as Assistant Coach for Queensland Country in the National Rugby Championship before being named Head Coach of Easts Tigers in 2015 where they went on to become Minor Premiers before losing to Souths Rugby Club in the Grand Final.

=== Australian Capital Territory ===
A move to the Australian Capital Territory followed, with Sampson joining Tuggeranong Vikings as Director of Rugby/Head Coach in the ACTRU Premier Grade competition. Having experienced a successful spell in charge of the Tuggeranong Vikings from 2015-2017, Sampson earned a national call-up, joining the Australian U20s (Junior Wallabies) as an Assistant Coach.

He also coached the Canberra Vikings in the National Rugby Championship where they became Minor Premiers before losing to eventual champions Queensland Country in the Grand Final.

=== Western Force ===
Sampson’s stocks continued to rise within the Australian rugby landscape when he was hired as Head Coach of the Western Force in February 2018, where he would spend five seasons at the Western Australian club. Sampson led the Force to a maiden National Rugby Championship win in 2019, with a commanding 41-3 result over former side Canberra Vikings at UWA Sports Park.

Sampson then guided the Western Force through a rebuilding phase in the World Series Rugby and Global Rapid Rugby competitions, before the club was reinstated back into Super Rugby in 2020. Sampson signed a two-year contract extension in September 2020.

The Western Force enjoyed a historic return to Super Rugby, with Sampson leading the club to their first ever finals series appearance in 2021 following a memorable 30-27 win over the previously unbeaten Queensland Reds in front a packed crowd at HBF Park.

In 2022, the Western Force claimed their first win in New Zealand since 2014 with a 48-28 win over Moana Pasifika at Mt Smart Stadium in Auckland in Round 15 of Super Rugby Pacific. A week later, Sampson’s side won their first Super Rugby match over the Wellington Hurricanes since 2007, with an unforgettable 27-22 win in the final round of the season.

=== Melbourne Rebels ===
https://www.rugby.com.au/news/former-force-coach-tim-sampson-joins-melbourne-rebels-2022817

=== Fijian Drua ===
https://www.rugby.com.au/news/former-rebels-assistant-force-coach-sampson-links-up-with-fijian-drua-202486

https://drua.rugby/content/tim-sampson-named-attack-coach-for-drua-men

== Sources ==
- "Annual Report 2007" (PDF). Queensland Rugby. 2007. Archived from the original (PDF 3.2 MB) on 2 May 2014.
