= Lolo Fakaosilea =

Australian rugby union player

- Born: Lolo Fakaosilea; 10 June 1995 (age 31) Auckland, New Zealand
- Height: 190 cm (6 ft 3 in)
- Weight: 111 kg (17 st 7 lb)
- School: St Patrick's, Shorncliffe; Brisbane Boys College; Marist College Emerald
- Notable relative(s): Jonah Lomu, Seiana Fakaosilea
- Occupation: Professional Rugby Player

Rugby union career
- Position: Blindside Flanker / Number 8
- Current team: Kintetsu Liners
Senior career
Years	Team	Apps	(Points)
2014–16	Queensland Country	2	(0)
2017	Canberra Vikings	9	(5)
2018–	Kintetsu Liners	10	(30)
- Correct as of 22 February 2021
Super Rugby
Years	Team	Apps	(Points)
2015–16	Reds	4	(0)
2017–2018	Brumbies	36	(0)
- Correct as of 22 February 2021
International career
Years	Team	Apps	(Points)
2012–13	Australian Schoolboys	11	(25)
2014–15	Australia U20	4	

Lolo Fakaosilea (born 10 June 1995) is an Australian rugby union player. He currently plays as a flanker for Kintetsu Liners in the Top Challenge League in Japan.

== Family and early life ==
Lolo Fakaosilea was born in Auckland, New Zealand but moved to Brisbane, Queensland with his family as a young boy. His father Seiana Fakaosilea had played for the Auckland Blues and also represented the inaugural New Zealand Tongan first XV that played trial matches against the Pacific Islanders.

Fakaosilea started his rugby at the age of five, playing for the Sunnybank Rugby junior club until he was twelve. He then moved to Emerald where he attended Marist College from 2009 to 2011. While playing rugby for Marist College he was selected in the Central Queensland Bushrangers team to play in the Queensland Junior State Championships. He returned to Brisbane for his senior high school years at Brisbane Boys College and St Patrick's College, Shorncliffe. Fakaosilea was selected for the Australian Schoolboys rugby team in 2012 and 2013.

Fakaosilea is also a nephew of the former All Black rugby star Jonah Lomu, and he is briefly mentioned in Lomu's autobiography.

== Career ==
Fakaosilea played premier grade rugby for the Sunnybank club. He was selected for the Australian Men's Youth Sevens team to play at the Youth Olympic Festival held at Sydney in 2013, before signing a one-year contract for the 2014 season, and then later on signing a further two-year contract with the Queensland Reds for the 2015 and 2016 seasons.

In 2014, he played for the Reds A team in the Pacific Rugby Cup, and was selected for the Australia U20 team to play at the 2014 IRB Junior World Championship held in New Zealand. Later that year Fakaosilea was named in the Queensland Country squad for the National Rugby Championship, but was sadly side lined, after sustaining a torn meniscus which resulted in needing surgery.

Fakaosilea made his Super Rugby debut for the Reds during the 2015 Super Rugby season, coming off the bench against the Hurricanes at Lang Park. He was selected again for the Australian Under 20 team in 2015.
