= James Tuttle (rugby union) =

Australian rugby union player

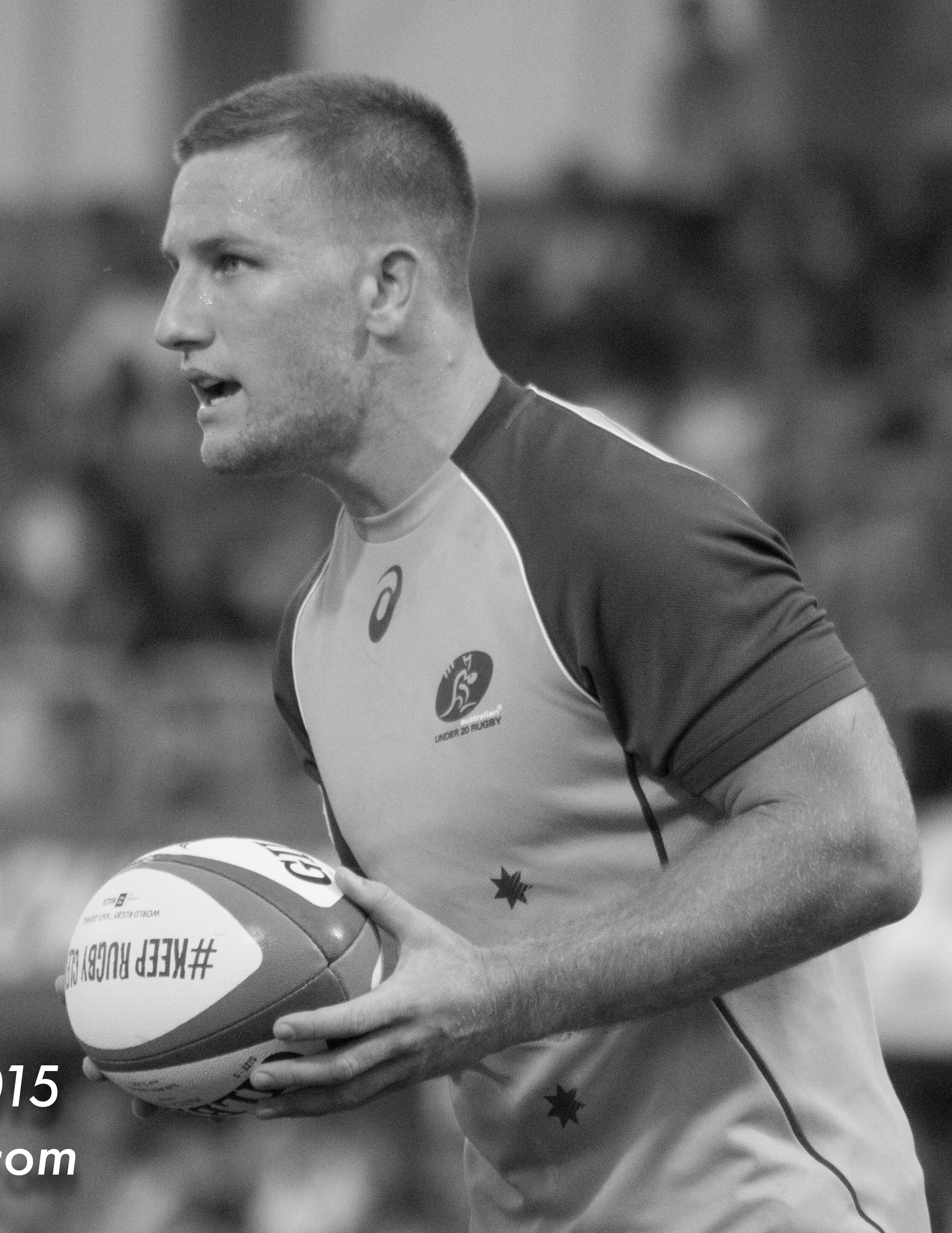
- Tuttle with Australia U20s in 2015
- Born: James Tuttle; 13 May 1996 (age 30) Brisbane, Queensland, Australia
- Height: 1.76 m (5 ft 9 in)
- Weight: 84 kg (13 st 3 lb)
- School: St Joseph's College, Nudgee

Rugby union career
- Position: Scrum-half
Senior career
Years	Team	Apps	(Points)
2014–	GPS		
2014–2018	Queensland Country	39	(153)
- Correct as of 3 September 2019
Super Rugby
Years	Team	Apps	(Points)
2016–2019	Reds	24	(50)
2020–2024	Rebels	45	(3)
- Correct as of 8 June 2024
International career
Years	Team	Apps	(Points)
2013	Australian Schoolboys	4	
2015–2016	Australia U20	11	(7)
2022	Australia A	5	(10)

James Tuttle (born 13 May 1996) is an Australian rugby union player. He last played for Melbourne Rebels after previously playing for the Queensland Reds.

Tuttle attended St Joseph's College, Nudgee and represented Queensland and Australia at schoolboy rugby in 2013. He joined Queensland club side GPS, and his performances in the Queensland Premier Rugby competition led to his signing with the Queensland Country team for the inaugural season of the National Rugby Championship (NRC) in 2014.

In 2015, Tuttle was selected for the Australia Under-20 team to play at the World Rugby Under 20 Championship in Italy. He signed a three-year Super Rugby contract with the Brisbane-based Reds in 2015, and toured with the team to South Africa but did not play. After Queensland Country's captain Anthony Fainga'a was forced to withdraw from the 2015 NRC season due to injury, Tuttle was appointed as the new captain of the side.

Tuttle currently studies a Bachelor of Commerce at Deakin University as of 2024.

In 2022, Tuttle was selected for the Australia ‘A’ Rugby Union Team to play at the Pacific Nations Cup in Fiji. Later that year, he toured again with Australia ‘A’ to Japan to play the Japan XV side in a three-match series. Tuttle was appointed as captain for the team’s final match in Osaka.

In 2023, Tuttle again toured with the Australia A rugby union side to France to play against Portugal in a RWC warm up match. He later joined the Barbarian FC for a 6 week tour of the UK playing against English Premiership sides Northampton, Bristol, Gloucester, Harlequins and against URC side Scarlets.

== Super Rugby statistics ==
As of 3 June 2023

Season	Team	Games	Starts	Sub	Mins	Tries	Cons	Pens	Drops	Points	Yel	Red
2016	Reds	5	2	3	183	0	0	0	0	0	1	0
2017	Reds	13	9	4	742	1	1	1	0	10	0	0
2018	Reds	6	5	1	365	0	5	10	0	40	0	0
2019	Reds	0	0	0	0	0	0	0	0	0	0	0
2020	Rebels	0	0	0	0	0	0	0	0	0	0	0
2020 AU	Rebels	4	1	3	79	0	0	0	0	0	0	0
2021 AU	Rebels	5	0	5	40	0	0	0	0	0	0	0
2021 TT	Rebels	4	0	4	70	0	0	1	0	3	0	0
2022	Rebels	12	8	4	540	0	0	0	0	0	0	0
2023	Rebels	12	0	12	211	0	0	0	0	0	0	0
Total		61	25	36	2,230	1	6	12	0	53	1	0
