= Ian Seib =

Australian cricketer (born 1946)

Personal information
- Full name: Ian Martin Seib
- Born: 15 September 1946 (age 80); Herston, Brisbane, Queensland, Australia
- Batting: Right-handed
- Relatives: Rod Seib (son)

Domestic team information
- Years: Team
- 1969-70 to 1974-75: Queensland

Career statistics
Competition	FC	List A
Matches	33	7
Runs scored	1303	143
Batting average	22.08	23.83
100s/50s	1/5	0/1
Top score	101	64*
Balls bowled	3	0
Wickets	0	–
Bowling average	–	–
5 wickets in innings	–	–
10 wickets in match	–	–
Best bowling	–	–
Catches/stumpings	35/–	5/–
- Source: Cricinfo, 16 January 2020

Ian Martin Seib (born 15 September 1946) is a former cricketer who played first-class cricket for Queensland from 1969 to 1975.

== Early life ==
Seib was born and raised in Brisbane, Queensland, Australia. He attended Brisbane State High School.

== Career ==
Ian Seib was a solid opening batsman whose only century in 63 first-class innings was 101, the highest score in the match, when Queensland defeated Western Australia in the Sheffield Shield in 1973-74. He won the man of the match award in his first List A match when he scored 64 not out off 146 balls to steer Queensland to victory over New South Wales in 1970-71.

His son Rod is a rugby union coach and a former rugby player for Queensland.
