= Horan–Little Shield =

Australian rugby union trophy

- Sport: Rugby union
- Presented by: Rugby Australia
- Type: Challenge trophy
- First contested: 2015
- Current holder: NSW Country
- Official website: rugby.com.au

The Horan–Little Shield is a trophy in Australia's domestic rugby union competition. Proposed to the Australian Rugby Union, now known as Rugby Australia, by members of the Green and Gold Rugby supporters website, it was first played for in 2015.

The Shield is modelled on New Zealand's Ranfurly Shield, in which the holding union must defend the shield in challenge matches, and a successful challenger becomes the new holder of the Shield. The team who holds the Shield at the conclusion of the National Rugby Championship is considered to have won the Shield for that year, and are the only team to have their name engraved on it.

The Shield is named for former Wallaby players Tim Horan and Jason Little to symbolise friendship and community. Horan and Little played together and against each other from junior club level all the way up to become Australia's centre field partnership in winning the Rugby World Cup.

The Shield was first won by Melbourne Rising before the 2015 season, by virtue of their undefeated record in the inaugural NRC regular season.

== Challenges ==
Terms of competition for the Horan–Little Shield are:

A team that holds the Shield is required to put it up for challenge at every home fixture. They are not obliged to accept challenges for away fixtures, though they may choose to do so.^{a}

If a team has successfully defended two challenge matches since becoming the Shield holder, then that team's subsequent matches, home or away, become automatic challenges. The Shield holder at the end of the regular season (or after a finals match where the holder chose to put the Shield up for challenge) becomes the only team whose name is engraved on the Shield as winner for that season.

== Shield record ==
Shield season winners
Year	Team
2014	Melbourne Rising
2015	Brisbane City
2016	NSW Country Eagles
2017	Perth Spirit
2018	Fijian Drua
2019	NSW Country Eagles

Holders of the Horan–Little Shield
Year	Team	Became the holder	Successful defences
2014	Melbourne Rising	18 October 2014	1
2015	Brisbane City	29 August 2015	5
2016	Canberra Vikings	11 September 2016	1
2016	Melbourne Rising	25 September 2016	0
2016	Western Sydney Rams	2 October 2016	0
2016	NSW Country Eagles	8 October 2016	0
2017	Greater Sydney Rams	3 September 2017	1
2017	Fijian Drua	7 October 2017	0
2017	Queensland Country	21 October 2017	0
2017	Perth Spirit	29 October 2017	0
2018	Force^{b}	1 September 2018	3
2018	Fijian Drua	13 October 2018	1
2019	Force	7 September 2019	2
2019	NSW Country	29 September 2019	0

== See also ==
- History of rugby union in Australia

== Notes ==
^^{a} Melbourne Rising notably defended the shield for the first time in an away fixture against Queensland Country.

^^{b} Western Force inherited the shield when they replaced Perth Spirit as Western Australia's team in the NRC for the 2018 season. Spirit had won it in the final round of the 2017 regular season.
