= Hugh Street Rugby Grounds =

Sports ground in Queensland, Australia

Mike Carney Toyota Park
- Interactive map of Mike Carney Toyota Park
- Former names: Hugh Street Rugby Grounds
- Location: 165 Hugh St, Currajong, Townsville, Queensland
- Coordinates: 19°16′25″S 146°46′59″E
- Owner: Townsville and Districts Rugby Union
- Capacity: 5,000 total (2,000 seated)
- Surface: Grass

Construction
- Opened: 1979

Tenant
- Queensland Country (2014, 2018)

Hugh Street Rugby Grounds, known also as Mike Carney Toyota Park is a sports venue located in the suburb of Currajong in Townsville, Queensland, Australia. The venue is owned by the Townsville and Districts Rugby Union (TDRU) and was officially opened on 11 March 1979.

The main ground has lighting and a grandstand with a seating capacity of approximately 2,000. As well being used for local rugby union matches, it is also one of the home grounds for the Queensland Country team that plays in the National Rugby Championship.

A redevelopment of the site was proposed in 2014 with the possibility of the TDRU moving to a new venue.
