= Dallan Murphy =

Australian rugby union player

- Born: Dallan Murphy; 22 July 1988 (age 38) Brisbane, Australia
- Height: 1.81 m (5 ft 11 1/2 in)
- Weight: 87 kg (192 lb; 13 st 10 lb)
- Notable relative: Damon Murphy (brother)

Rugby union career
- Position: Fly-half
- Current team: Rotherham Titans
Amateur team(s)
Years	Team	Apps	(Points)
1998 - 2013	Brothers Old Boys		
Senior career
Years	Team	Apps	(Points)
2012–13	Pays d'Aix		
2013–14	Rotherham Titans	21	(20)
2015−16	Canon Eagles	1	(0)
- Correct as of 21 July 2016
Super Rugby
Years	Team	Apps	(Points)
2011–12	Queensland Reds	2	(4)

Dallan Murphy (born 22 July 1988) is an Australian professional rugby union footballer. His regular playing position is fly-half

Murphy won a Queensland Premier Rugby title playing for Brothers in 2009. He played for the Queensland Reds in the Super Rugby competition in 2011 and 2012. He made his debut for the Reds during the 2011 Super Rugby season against the Chiefs in Hamilton.

He joined English club Rotherham Titans in 2013.
