= Tom Kibble (rugby union) =

Australian rugby union player

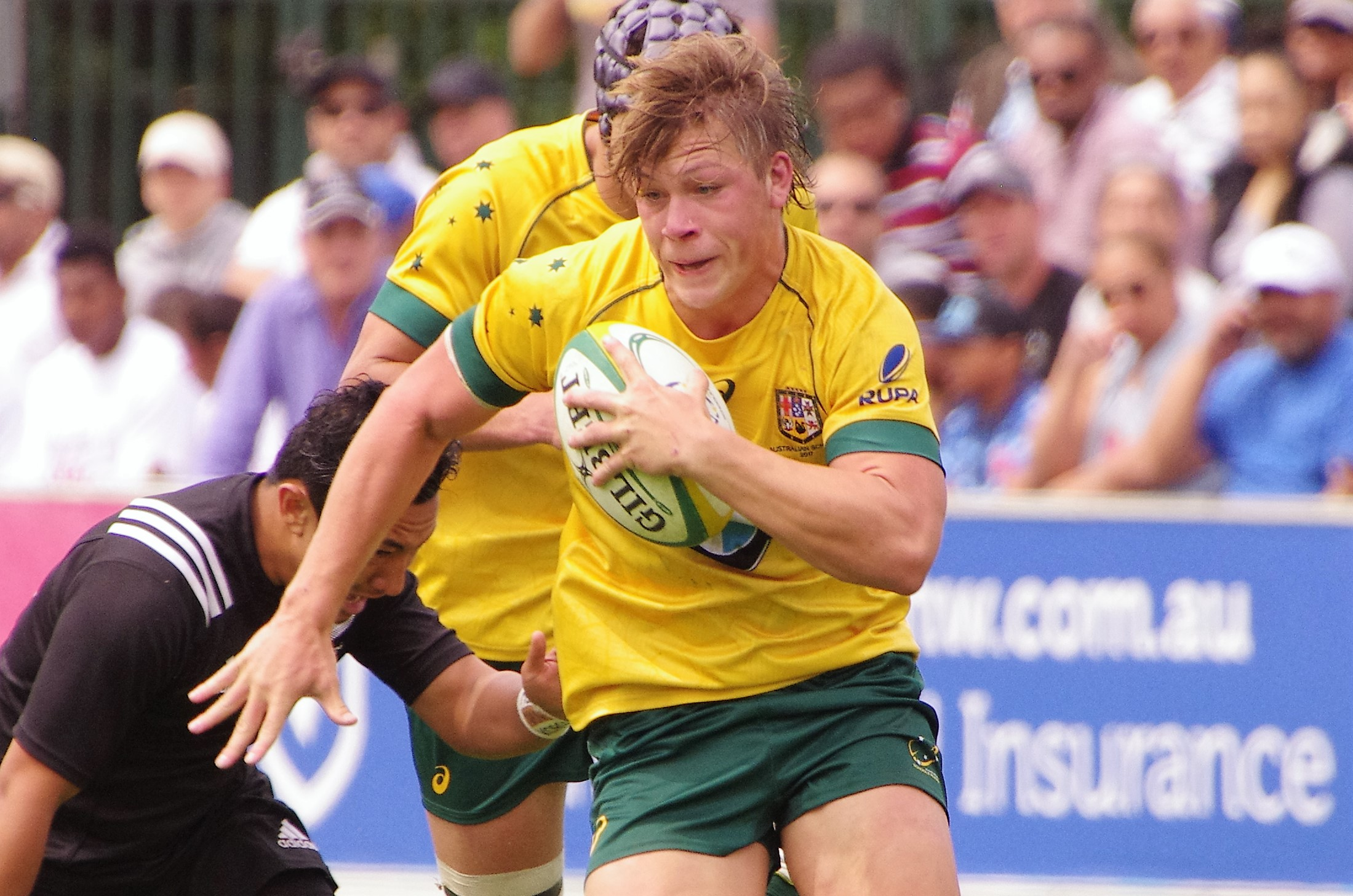
- Born: 3 June 2000 (age 26) Australia
- Height: 182 cm (6 ft 0 in)
- Weight: 100 kg (220 lb; 15 st 10 lb)

Rugby union career
- Position: Flanker
Senior career
Years	Team	Apps	(Points)
2018–	Queensland Country	7	(10)
- Correct as of 4 November 2019
Super Rugby
Years	Team	Apps	(Points)
2020–	Reds	0	(0)
- Correct as of 4 November 2019

Tom Kibble (born 3 June 2000 in Australia) is an Australian rugby union player who plays for the Queensland Reds in Super Rugby. His playing position is flanker. He has signed for the Reds squad in 2020.
