= Damon Murphy =

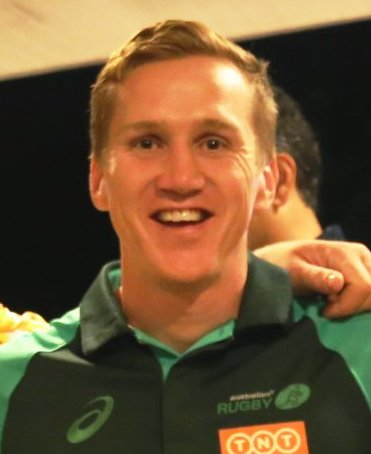
- Born: Damon Murphy; 15 December 1984 (age 41) Brisbane, Australia
- Height: 1.75 m (5 ft 9 in)
- Weight: 85 kg (13 st 5 lb; 187 lb)
- School: Nudgee College
- Notable relative: Dallan Murphy (brother)

Rugby union career
- Position(s): Referee, Wing
Senior career
Years	Team	Apps	(Points)
2003–2013	Brothers Old Boys	155	
2007	Rebels (ARC)	8	(20)
Provincial / State sides
Years	Team	Apps	(Points)
2012	Queensland	1	(0)
National sevens team
Years	Team		Comps
2004–2010	Australia 7s		
Refereeing career
Years	Competition		Apps
2016–pres.	World Rugby Sevens		11
2016–pres.	NRC		5
- Correct as of 28 January 2018

Damon Murphy (born 15 December 1984) is an Australian professional rugby union referee and a former national captain for Australia in rugby sevens. His usual position was on the wing.

== Family and early life ==
Damon Murphy was born in Brisbane and educated at Nudgee College. His younger brother Dallan Murphy also became a professional rugby union player.

== Rugby career ==
Murphy played club rugby for Brothers Old Boys, where, playing mainly at fullback, he was the club's all-time leading try scorer with 96 tries during his career there spanning eleven seasons. He was selected for the Australian 7s team in 2004. After three seasons, including representing his country at the 2006 Commonwealth Games in Melbourne, he refocused on fifteen-a-side rugby and signed with the Melbourne Rebels to play in the Australian Rugby Championship.

Resuming his career with the national sevens team, Murphy was Australia's leading points scorer in the 2007–08 World Series. He played in the 2009 Rugby World Cup Sevens. He also captained the side.

Murphy played for the Queensland Reds in 2012, although was not selected for Super Rugby.

== Refereeing career ==
Murphy made a rapid rise up the refereeing ranks in 2016, making his debut with the whistle in both Queensland Premier Rugby and Australia's National Rugby Championship in that year. He joined the World Rugby Sevens Series referees panel for the 2016–17 season.
