= Queensland Country (NRC team) =

Australian rugby union team

- Founded: 2014
- Disbanded: 2020 (competition disbanded)
- Region: Queensland Regions, excluding Brisbane
- Ground(s): Marley Brown Oval, Gladstone (Cap: 5,000) Bond Field No. 1, Robina (Cap: 6,000)
- Coach: Rod Seib
- Captain: Angus Scott-Young
- League: National Rugby Championship
- 2018: Runner-up (finals); 2nd placed (regular season)
Team kit

Queensland Country was an Australian rugby union football team that competed in the National Rugby Championship (NRC). The team is one of two Queensland sides in the competition, the other being Brisbane City. Queensland Country is organised and managed by the Queensland Rugby Union (QRU), with the coaching and training programs used at the Queensland Reds extended to players joining the team from the Reds, Premier and Country rugby teams.

The Queensland Country team in the NRC draws its identity from the Queensland Country representative team that has played in regular City-Country fixtures in Queensland since 1902. The same colours have been adopted for the team in the NRC competition and, while the Heelers' Australian Cattle Dog logo is not used, an emblem based on the traditional Cooktown Orchid logo of the Queensland Country Rugby Union has been adopted. The Queensland Country uniform is blue and white, with a crest of the orchid logo inside Queensland Rugby's traditional 'Q' on the jersey's chest.

The NRC was launched in 2014, reinstating the national competition after the Australian Rugby Championship (ARC) was discontinued following the first season in 2007. The Queensland Country NRC team plays in various Queensland regional centres. Existing QRU staffing roles and infrastructure are utilised, and the training base for the team is at QRU's headquarters at Ballymore.

== History ==
Rugby within Country Queensland began to gain significant popular support after the first intercolonial match between New South Wales and Queensland in 1882. Prior to this, Melbourne rules (Australian football) was more often played. Regional centres such as Toowoomba, Rockhampton, Maryborough and Charters Towers established their own rugby unions in the 1880s and 1890s.

=== Representative team ===
The first City-Country match between Brisbane and Queensland Country (selected from the rest of Queensland) was held at the inaugural Country Week carnival hosted by the QRU in 1902. Despite several successful seasons, the Country Week carnivals ceased following the rise of rugby league after 1909. The start of the First World War brought rugby union to a halt in Queensland after 1914. Although the QRU was eventually revived in 1928–29, rugby languished in country regions of the state for many decades.

City-Country matches were resumed in 1965. From 1968 until 1982, annual Country Carnival competitions were held from which the Country team was selected to play Brisbane and other representative sides. The Country Carnival was discontinued in favour of State Championships in 1983. While the format of competition has varied over time, City-Country matches between the Brisbane and Queensland Country representative teams have remained regular fixtures since.

=== East Coast Aces (ARC team) ===
East Coast Aces logo.

In 2006, after setting up a consultative process culminating in a working session of some 70 delegates from around the country, the Australian Rugby Union announced that a new, eight-team national competition would commence in 2007 to compete for the Australian Rugby Championship (ARC).

The East Coast Aces, based on the Gold Coast, was formed as one of two Queensland teams supported by the QRU in the ARC, alongside the Ballymore Tornadoes. The Chairman of the Steering Committee for the Aces said that the team had selected a name that would embrace the various stakeholders at club level. He added:

Our team will draw on players and supporters from Cairns to Coolangatta—and possibly even rugby fans in northern NSW—in what is an exciting development for the code in Queensland.

— Peter Murdoch, Steering Committee Chairman, 2007.

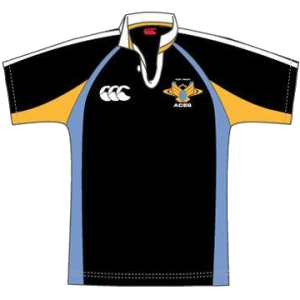
The East Coast Aces jersey in the ARC.

Queensland's two teams in the ARC were aligned with existing clubs and regions. The East Coast Aces team was aligned with Queensland Country and the Queensland Premier Rugby clubs south of the Brisbane River – Souths, Easts, Sunnybank, and Gold Coast. The Aces played home matches at Carrara Stadium on the Gold Coast. The QRU had initially considered basing the team out of Ballymore, before settling on the Gold Coast. The Aces' colours were black, blue and gold.

The head coach of the Aces was John Boe, who was also head coach of the Gold Coast Breakers - one of the Ace's feeder teams. Boe was a former All Black and World Cup coach (leading Samoa at the 2003 tournament) and a previous assistant coach at both the Chiefs and the Highlanders. The assistant coach for the Aces was former Wallaby Garrick Morgan.

The Australian Rugby Championship was terminated at the end of 2007 after only one season of competition, with the Australian Rugby Union citing higher costs than budgeted and further projected financial losses. The Aces team was disbanded at the end of the ARC. The team had incurred significant financial losses, with an average home attendance for the season of just 1,428, the lowest in the ARC.

=== National Rugby Championship ===
Qld Country main and alternate kits 2016.

In December 2013, the ARU announced that the national competition was to be relaunched, with the National Rugby Championship (NRC) commencing in 2014. Expressions of interest were open to any interested parties, with the accepted bids finalised in early 2014. There was initial interest from Queensland clubs and regions in forming NRC teams themselves, but to eliminate the risks to sub-unions and clubs, the Queensland Rugby Union decided to organise and manage two teams centrally in the early years of the competition. On 24 March 2014, it was announced that the Queensland Country and Brisbane City teams would play in the NRC competition.

Anthony Fainga'a was Queensland Country's captain for the inaugural season in 2014. Fainga'a was initially named as captain again for the following season but he was forced out through injury and James Tuttle became the captain for 2015.

== Sponsors ==
Queensland Country secured Bond University as principal partner in 2014, with the team officially known as Bond University Queensland Country.

== Home grounds ==
Location of Queensland Country's home venues for 2019

The Queensland Country team has its training base at Ballymore in Brisbane, the traditional home of Queensland Rugby. The team has scheduled home matches at the following locations:

City	Venue	Capacity
Home venues for the current season
Gold Coast	Bond Rugby Field	5,000
Gladstone	Marley Brown Oval	6,000
Home venues for previous seasons
Brisbane	Ballymore	24,000
Gold Coast	Cbus Super Stadium	27,000
Ipswich	North Ipswich Reserve	5,500
Mackay	Stadium Mackay	12,000
Rockhampton	Rugby Park	5,000
Sunshine Coast	Noosa Dolphins Club	3,000
Sunshine Coast	Stockland Park	12,000
Toowoomba	Sports Ground	9,000
Townsville	Hugh Street Grounds	5,000

== Current squad ==
The squad for the 2019 NRC season:

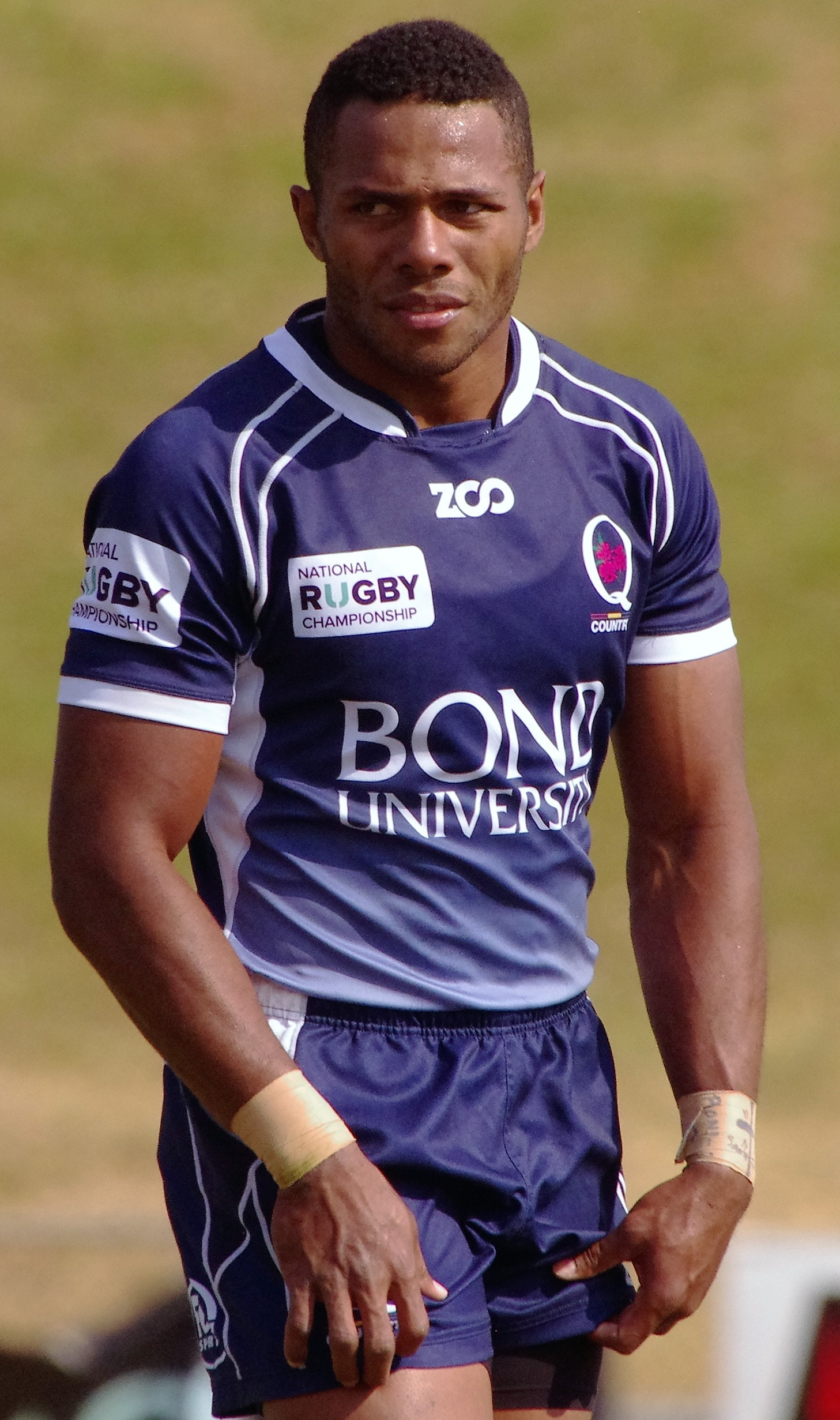
Winger Filipo Daugunu

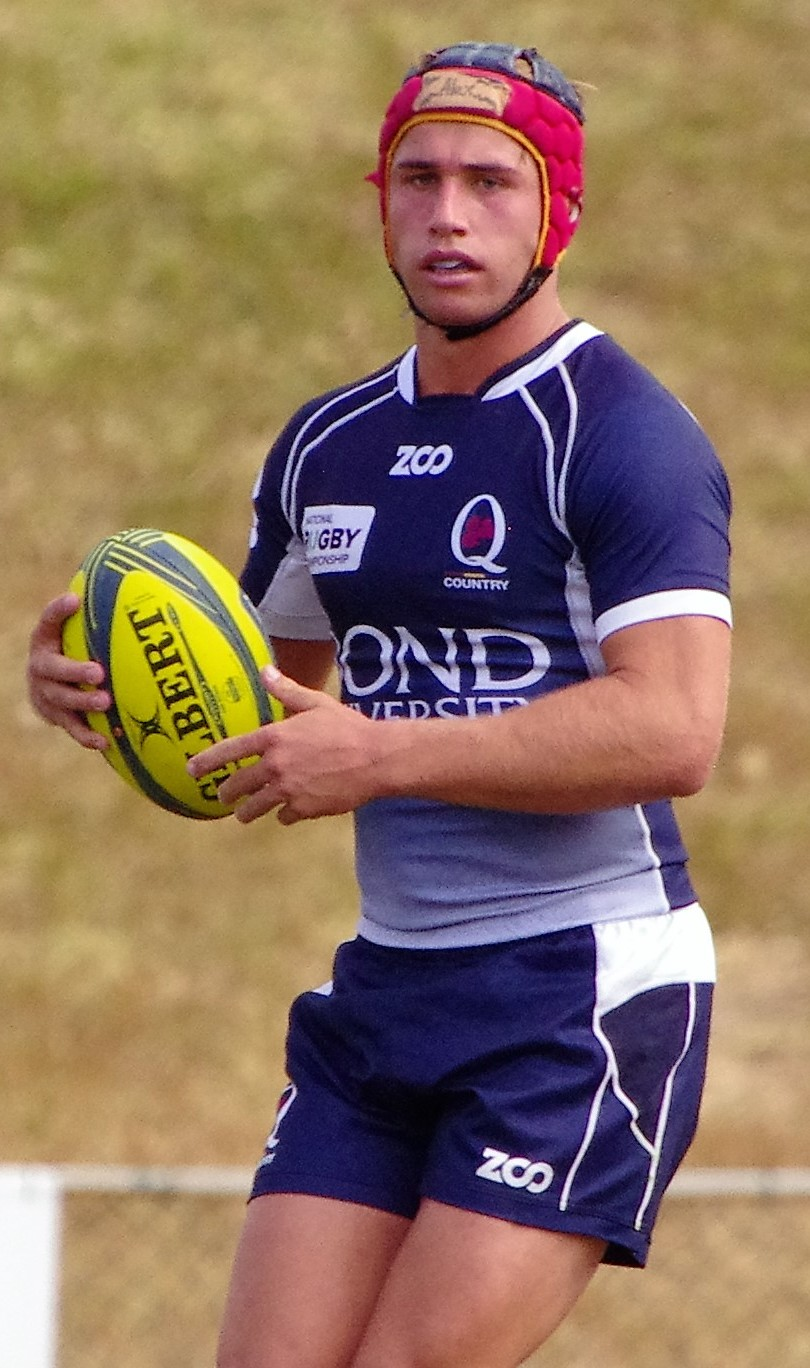
Fly-half Hamish Stewart

Queensland Country squad – NRC 2019 (Note: Initial squad was named in late August.)
Prop: (Australia) Harry Hoopert; (New Zealand) Jethro Felemi; (Australia) George Francis (Note: Francis and Pritchard weren't in the original squad but were named in the team for Round 1.); (Australia) Gavin Luka; (Australia) Carter Ozanne; (Samoa) **Bronson Tauakipulu**; Hooker: (Australia) Matt Faessler; (Australia) Efi Ma'afu; (Australia) Alex Mafi; Lock: (Australia) Angus Blyth; (Australia) Will Dearden; (Australia) Harry Hockings; (Australia) Zac Moi Moi; Backrow: (Australia) Tom Kibble; (Australia) Jeremiah Lynch; (Zimbabwe) **Connor Pritchard**; (Australia) Angus Scott-Young (c); (New Zealand) Dillon Wihongi; (Australia) Harry Wilson; (Australia) **Liam Wright**^{1}	Scrum-half: (Australia) Liam Dillon; (Australia) Tate McDermott; (Australia) Reuben Wall; Fly-half: (Australia) Carter Gordon; (Australia) Rohan Saifoloi; (Australia) Hamish Stewart; Centre: (Australia) Daniel Boardman; (Australia) Patrick James; (Australia) **Chris Feauai-Sautia**; Wing: (Australia) Jock Campbell; (Australia) Connor Chittenden; (Fiji) Filipo Daugunu; (Australia) Joey Fittock; (Australia) Jonathan Kent; Fullback: (Australia) Tom Lucas; Notes:
**Bold** denotes player is internationally capped. (c) Denotes team captain. ^{1} denotes marquee player.

== Records ==
=== Honours ===
- **National Rugby Championship**
  - Champions: 2017
  - Runners-up: 2018

=== Season standings ===
National Rugby Championship

Year	Pos	Pld	W	D	L	F	A	+/-	BP	Pts	Play-offs
2018	**2nd**	7	5	0	2	299	211	+88	4	**24**	Grand final loss to Fijian Drua by 36–26
2017	**2nd**	8	6	0	2	316	204	+112	5	**29**	Grand final win over Canberra Vikings by 42–28
2016	**8th**	7	1	0	6	248	346	−98	3	**7**	Did not compete
2015	**8th**	8	2	0	6	230	336	−106	1	**9**	Did not compete
2014	**8th**	8	2	0	6	208	281	−73	3	**11**	Did not compete

Australian Rugby Championship (Aces)

Year	Pos	Pld	W	D	L	F	A	+/-	BP	Pts	Play-offs
2007	**8th**	8	2	0	6	163	343	−180	3	**11**	Did not compete

=== Head coaches ===
- Rod Seib (2018–present)
- Brad Thorn (2017)
- Toutai Kefu (2016)
- Jason Gilmore (2015)
- Steve Meehan (2014)

=== Captains ===
- Angus Scott-Young (2019–present)
- Duncan Paia'aua (2017–2018)
- James Tuttle (2015–2016)
- Anthony Fainga'a (2014)

=== Squads ===
2016 Queensland Country squad – NRC
The squad for the 2016 National Rugby Championship season:
**Props**: Richie Asiata; **Ben Daley**; Sef Fa'agase; Kirwan Sanday; **James Slipper**^{1}; Taniela Tupou; **Hookers**: Alex Casey; **Saia Fainga'a**; Feleti Kaitu’u; **Stephen Moore**^{1}; **Locks**: Tyrell Barker; Phil Potgieter; Izack Rodda; **Rob Simmons**^{1}; **Brad Thorn**	**Loose forwards**: Jack Cornelsen; Lolo Fakaosilea; Maclean Jones; Conor Mitchell; Apisai Naiyabo; Angus Scott-Young; **Scrum-halves**: Issak Fines-Leleiwasa; Scott Malolua; James Tuttle (c); **Fly-halves**: Mack Mason; Mitch Third	**Centres**: Joshua Birch; Matt Gordon; Campbell Magnay; Duncan Paia'aua; **Wingers**: Tyrone Lefau; Eto Nabuli; Izaia Perese; Tom Pincus; **Fullbacks**: Tom Banks; Liam McNamara; Notes: (c) Team captain **Bold** denotes internationally capped players at the time^{1} National player additional to contracted squad.

2015 Queensland Country squad – NRC
The squad for the 2015 National Rugby Championship season:
**Props**: Sef Fa'agase; Haydn Hirsimaki; Taniela Tupou; **Greg Holmes**; Andrew Parker; **James Slipper**^{1}; **Hookers**: **Saia Fainga'a**; Alex Mafi; Tonga Ma’afu; Campbell Wakely; **Locks**: Lukhan Tui; Richie Arnold; Phil Potgieter; Cameron Bracewell; **Rob Simmons**^{1}	**Loose forwards**: Jack Cornelson; James Turner; Conor Mitchell; Ed Quirk; **Radike Samo**; Lolo Fakaosilea; **Scrum-halves**: Scott Gale; Harry Nucifora; James Tuttle (c); **Fly-halves**: Sam Greene; Duncan Paia'aua; Dion Taumata	**Centres**: **Anthony Fainga'a**; Campbell Magnay; Stephan van der Walt; **Wingers**: Matt Gordon; Izaia Perese; **Chris Feauai-Sautia**; Elliot Hagen; **Fullbacks**: Tom Banks; Jamie-Jerry Taulagi; Notes: (c) Team captain **Bold** denotes internationally capped players at the time^{1} National player additional to contracted squad.

2014 Queensland Country squad – NRC
The squad for the 2014 National Rugby Championship season:
**Props**: Fred Burke; Haydn Hirsimaki; **Greg Holmes**; Kirwan Sanday; James Slipper; **Hookers**: **Saia Fainga'a**; Ryan Freney; Tonga Ma’afu; **Locks**: Cameron Bracewell; Blake Enever; Sam Fattal; Rubin Fuimaono; Jack Payne; **Rob Simmons**	**Loose forwards**: Ben Adams; Jack de Guingand; Lolo Fakasilea; Mitch King; **Beau Robinson**; James Turner; **Scrum-halves**: Scott Gale; Sam Grasso; **Fly-halves**: Matt Brandon; **Mike Harris**; James Tuttle	**Centres**: **Anthony Fainga'a** (c); Sam Johnson; Clynton Knox; Campbell Magnay; Uarotafu Setu; **Wingers**: Giles Beveridge; Pierce Fitzgerald; Todd Winkley; **Fullbacks**: Ben Lucas; Tom Pincus; Jamie-Jerry Taulagi; Notes: (c) Team captain **Bold** denotes internationally capped players at the time^{1} National player additional to contracted squad.

2007 East Coast Aces squad – ARC
**Props**: Lloyd Campbell-McBride; Tama Tuirirangi; Ben Coutts; Joe Tufuga; **Hookers**: Jade Ingham; Ole Avei; **Locks**: Will Munsie; Luke Caughley; Rob Simmons	**Back row**: Ben Mowen; Daniel Ese; A.J. Gilbert; Josh Afu; **Halfbacks**: Nic Berry; Sam Batty; **Flyhalves**: Ben Lucas; Quade Cooper	**Centres**: **Lloyd Johansson**; Waitai Walker; Charlie Fetoai; **Henari Veratau**; **Wings**: Caleb Brown; **Brett Stapleton**; **Fullbacks**: **Chris Latham**; **Andrew Walker**; Marshall Milroy; John Dart; Notes: (c) Team captain **Bold** denotes internationally capped players at the time

== See also ==
- Queensland Reds
- Queensland Premier Rugby
- Rugby union in Queensland
- Combined New South Wales–Queensland Country

== Sources ==
- Purcell, Andy (2002). "120 Years of Country Rugby 1882-2002" (PDF). Queensland Rugby0.2 MB. Archived (PDF) from the original on 20 May 2014.
- "Annual Report 2013" (PDF). Queensland Rugby. 2013. Archived from the original (PDF) on 8 July 2014.
