= Rod Seib =

Australian rugby union player & coach

- Born: Rodney Seib; 1975 (age 50–51) Australia
- School: Brisbane State High School

Rugby union career
- Position: Centre / Full Back
Amateur team(s)
Years	Team	Apps	(Points)
1996–2000	Sunnybank		
2001–2011	Aberdeen GSFP		
Senior career
Years	Team	Apps	(Points)
2002–2004	Glasgow Warriors		
Provincial / State sides
Years	Team	Apps	(Points)
1999–2000	Queensland	3	(0)
National sevens team
Years	Team		Comps
1998	Australia 7s		
Coaching career
- Years: Team
- 2011–2012: Aberdeen GSFP
- 2012–2016: Sunnybank
- 2016: Brisbane City
- 2018: Queensland Country
- 2019-2020: Queensland Reds Academy
- 2020–2025: ACT Brumbies
- 2024: Australia XV
- 2025-present: Connacht Rugby

Rodney Seib (born 1975) is an Australian professional rugby union coach and a former player for Queensland Reds and Glasgow Warriors. He also played for Australia in rugby sevens.

== Family and early life ==
Rod Seib attended Brisbane State High School, graduating in 1992. His father, Ian Seib, played first-class cricket for Queensland in the 1970s.

== Rugby career ==
=== Australian Sevens and Queensland ===
Seib joined the Sunnybank rugby club in Brisbane. He played for the Queensland Under-21 team in 1995, and was capped for the Australia 7s side, touring in 1999 to Uruguay and Argentina.

Later that year, after a standout season with Sunnybank for which he was awarded Queensland Rugby Union's XXXX Medal for player of the year (shared with Richard Graham of Easts), Seib was selected to play for the Queensland Reds in the Ricoh National championship. He was capped three times for Queensland, including a match against Argentina on their 2000 tour.

=== Aberdeen and Glasgow ===
Seib moved to Scotland the following year. Signing in 2001, he played for Aberdeen GSFP. Seib captained the Aberdeen side from 2002–06. He was also included in Aberdeen's Sevens squad.

In season 2002–03, Seib was called up to Glasgow Warriors back up squad. Such was his form for club side Aberdeen, there was much talk of Seib's move to the provincial Glasgow side being made permanent, however, work commitments prevented him joining Glasgow full-time. He played in the Warriors' match against Harlequins on 9 August 2002.

Seib won the Player's player of the year for the BT Premiership in 2003–04.

== Coaching career ==
Seib was made Head Coach of Aberdeen in 2011. From 2012 he coached Sunnybank Rugby. He later became an Assistant Coach at Brisbane City with responsibility for the team's attack. In 2016 he was promoted to Brisbane City's Head Coach position. Seib became head coach of Queensland Country in 2018.

In 2019, Seib returned to full time coaching as head coach of the Queensland Reds Academy. Since 2020 he has been assistant coach at the ACT Brumbies.

In November 2024 Seib coached the Australia XV on their UK Tour, with matches against Bristol and England A.

In March 2025 Seib signed with Connacht Rugby in Ireland as Senior Assistant Coach with responsibility for team attack

== Outside rugby ==
Away from rugby, Seib was a physical education teacher. He started teaching at Saint Stephen's College, Upper Coomera. While in Aberdeen he taught at Bridge of Don Academy.
