= Mick Heenan =

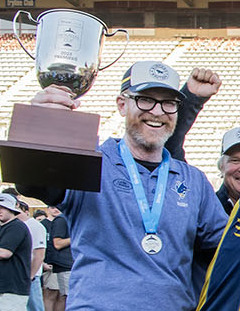
- Heenan with Bond University in 2025
- Born: Australia
- School: Marist College Ashgrove
- University: The University of Queensland
- Notable relative: Daniel Heenan (brother)

Rugby union career
- Position: Head coach
- Current team: Brisbane City
Coaching career
- Years: Team
- 2002–2009: GPS
- 2009–2022: University of Queensland
- 2017–2018: Brisbane City
- 2024–pres.: Bond University

Mick Heenan is an Australian professional rugby union coach. He was the head coach of the Brisbane City team that played in the defunct National Rugby Championship competition. He was the head coach at the University of Queensland, winning the Hospital Cup in 2010, 2012, 2014, 2017, 2019 and 2021. After stint as an assistant coach with the Queensland Reds, Heenan joined Bond University Rugby Club ahead of the 2024 season. He took Bond to the premiership title in 2025, winning his seventh Hospital Cup as head coach.
