= Duncan Paia'aua =

Samoa international rugby union player

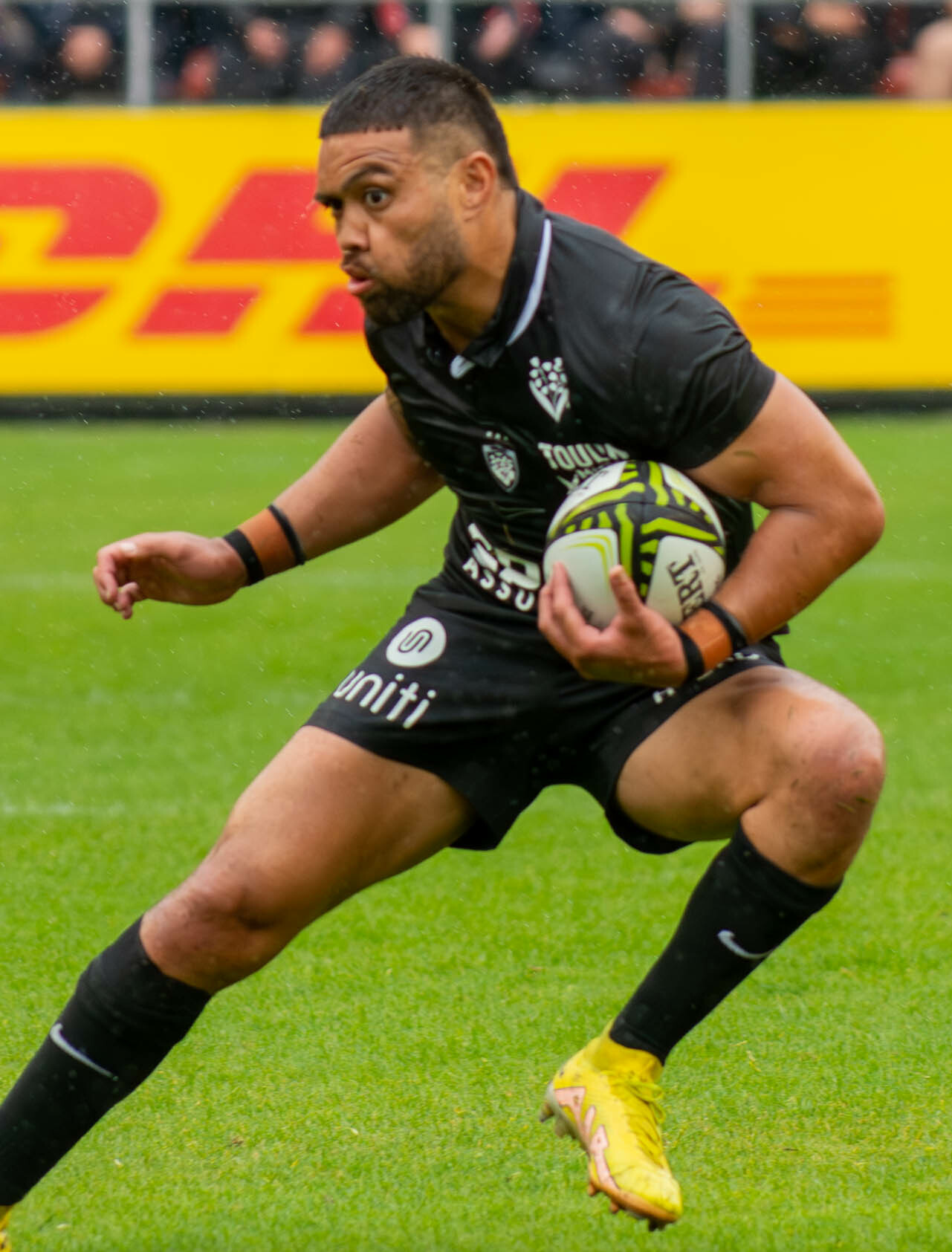
- Paia'aua representing Toulon during the EPCR Challenge Cup
- Born: 20 January 1995 (age 31) Porirua, New Zealand
- Height: 1.80 m (5 ft 11 in)
- Weight: 91 kg (201 lb; 14 st 5 lb)
- School: Emmaus College

Rugby union career
- Position: Centre Fullback
- Current team: Toulon
Senior career
Years	Team	Apps	(Points)
2014−2018	Queensland Country	27	(105)
2015–2019	Queensland Reds	48	(35)
2019–	Toulon	80	(95)
- Correct as of 28 August 2023
International career
Years	Team	Apps	(Points)
2015	Australia U20	5	(5)
2022–	Samoa	12	(43)
- Correct as of 28 August 2023

Duncan Paia'aua (born 20 January 1995) is a professional rugby union player who plays as a centre for Top 14 club Toulon. Born in New Zealand, he represents Samoa at international level.

== Early life ==
Paia'aua was born in Porirua, New Zealand but moved to Melbourne with his family at three years of age, and then settling in Rockhampton in 2002 playing junior league for Rockhampton Brothers. He played rugby at high school in Rockhampton and was twice selected for the Queensland Under 16 team.

He was chosen in the under 20 Junior Wallabies and competed in the Junior World Cup in Italy, June 2015, scoring 5 points for Australia.

== Club career ==
Paia'aua initially came through the Queensland Rugby Union's youth structures before switching to rugby league and linking up with the Brisbane Broncos where he represented their under-20s in the National Youth Competition. However, in August 2014 it was announced that he had switched back to rugby union and signed a 2-year contract with the Queensland Reds ahead of the 2015 Super Rugby season. He subsequently played 1 game for Queensland Country in the first ever National Rugby Championship, leading them to victory in 2018 and runner-up in 2019 as captain. He made his debut for the Queensland Reds in round 1, 2015 against the Brumbies in Canberra. His outstanding performance caught the eyes of major international recruiters. Paia'aua currently plays 10 or 12 at RC Toulon.

== International career ==
On 28 October 2017, Paia'aua started for the Wallabies against the Barbarians at Allianz Stadium, Sydney. He represented Australia at the Wallabies v Barbarians game in 2017 where he scored 16 of the 31 points although it was not officially designated a test match.

He finally made his international debut – for Samoa, his parents’ birthplace – against Italy in the 2022 end of year internationals. His second cap, against Georgia, ended in a red card for a dangerous tackle. He was suspended for four matches.

He represented Samoa at the 2023 Rugby World Cup scoring tries against Chile and Japan.
