= Chris Feauai-Sautia =

- Born: Christopher Feauai-Sautia; 17 November 1993 (age 32) Auckland, New Zealand
- Height: 181 cm (5 ft 11 in)
- Weight: 101 kg (223 lb; 15.9 st)
- School: Brisbane State High School

Rugby union career
- Position: Wing / Outside Centre
Senior career
Years	Team	Apps	(Points)
2015	Queensland Country	18	(45)
2016−2017	Kintetsu Liners	1	(0)
2020-2021	Oyonnax	7	(15)
- Correct as of 4 November 2015
Super Rugby
Years	Team	Apps	(Points)
2012–2020	Queensland Reds	81	(110)
2022–2023	Brumbies	3	(0)
- Correct as of 11 March 2022
International career
Years	Team	Apps	(Points)
2009–2011	Australian Schoolboys	11	
2012	Australia U20	4	(10)
2013	Australia	2	(10)
- Correct as of 24 November 2013

Chris Feauai-Sautia (born 17 November 1993) is an Australian professional rugby union footballer. He plays for the Queensland Reds in Super Rugby and his usual position is Wing, but can also play in the Centre.

== Early life ==
Of Samoan heritage, Feauai-Sautia was born in Auckland but moved to Brisbane with his family as a youngster.

Feauai-Sautia was educated at Brisbane State High School, finishing in 2011. He played rugby for the Australian Schoolboys three years in a row from 2009 to 2011.

Currently he is tied with Hugh Roach as the most capped Australian Schools player, with two more caps than the next highest, Quade Cooper and Kurtley Beale.

Feauai-Sautia was selected for the Australian U-20 team to play in the 2012 Junior World Cup in South Africa.

== Super Rugby ==
In 2012 Feauai-Sautia was promoted to the 30-man playing roster for the Reds. He made his Super Rugby debut for the Reds against the Lions at Lang Park on 19 May 2012, coming off the bench five minutes after half time and scoring a try four minutes later.

In the following fixture against the Rebels he made his run-on debut in place of the injured Digby Ioane, scoring the game's opening try.

Feauai-Sautia has joined the ACT Brumbies for the 2022 Super Rugby Pacific season after a short term switch to French side Oyonnax.
