= Angus Scott-Young =

Australian rugby union player

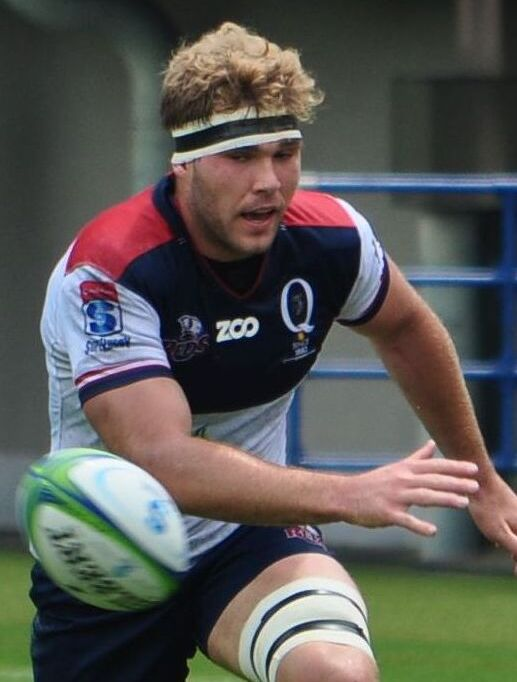
- Scott-Young with the Reds in 2018
- Born: 23 April 1997 (age 29) Brisbane, Queensland, Australia
- Height: 194 cm (6 ft 4 in)
- Weight: 108 kg (17 st 0 lb; 238 lb)
- School: Anglican Church Grammar School

Rugby union career
- Position: Loose forward
- Current team: NSW Waratahs
Amateur team(s)
Years	Team	Apps	(Points)
2015	University of Queensland		
2026	Western Sydney Two Blues	2	(0)
- Correct as of 21 June 2026
Senior career
Years	Team	Apps	(Points)
2016–2022	Queensland Country	30	(27)
2022–2025	Northampton Saints	77	(20)
- Correct as of 21 June 2026
Provincial / State sides
Years	Team	Apps	(Points)
2020	Bay of Plenty	7	(0)
Super Rugby
Years	Team	Apps	(Points)
2017–2022	Reds	61	(10)
2026–	Waratahs	9	(5)
- Correct as of 21 June 2026
International career
Years	Team	Apps	(Points)
2016–2017	Australia U20		

Angus Scott-Young (born 23 April 1997) is an Australian rugby union player who plays for the Waratahs in the Super Rugby competition. He previously played for Northampton Saints in Premiership Rugby and the Reds in Super Rugby. He also played for Bay of Plenty in New Zealand's National Provincial Championship. His position of choice is loose forward. He is the son of former Wallaby Sam Scott-Young.
