= UWA Sports Park =

Sporting and recreation reserve in Mount Claremont, Western Australia

- McGillivray Oval
- Interactive map of UWA Sports Park
- Location: McGillivray Road, Mount Claremont, Western Australia
- Coordinates: 31.951686°S 115.785644°E
- Owner: University of Western Australia
- Capacity: 4,000
- Surface: Grass

Tenants
- Western Force; UWAAC Athletics Club; UBSC University Baseball and Softball Club; UWA Hockey Club; UWA Rugby Club; UWA Tennis Club; UWA Football Club (PFL); UWA Nedlands Football Club; UWA Torpedoes

UWA Sports Park is a multi-purpose sporting and recreation reserve in Mount Claremont, Western Australia. It is located on 56 hectares (140 acres) of land approximately 10 kilometres (6.2 mi) west of Perth and is owned by the University of Western Australia.

The park provides sporting facilities for Australian rules football, Rugby union, soccer, and field hockey as well as baseball, softball and tennis. The park has clubhouse and changing room facilities and the fields have lighting suitable for hosting night time sports events.

The land that UWA Sports Park is situated on was gifted to the university by the Government of Western Australia in 1904.

Clubs based at UWA Sports Park as of 2014 include:

- UWAAC Athletics Club (founded 1928)
- UBSC University Baseball and Softball Club (founded 1947)
- UWA Hockey Club (est. 1924)
- UWA Rugby Club (founded 1929)
- UWA Tennis Club (est. 1914)
- UWA Football Club (founded 1911, Australian rules football - PFL)
- UWA Nedlands Football Club (founded 1949, Association football)

UWA Sports Park was also the main home ground in Perth to host National Rugby Championship matches; for the Perth Spirit (2014–2017) and Western Force (2018–2019).
