= National Rugby Championship =

Australian national rugby union competition

- Most recent season or competition: 2019 National Rugby Championship
- Sport: Rugby union
- Founded: 2014; 12 years ago
- First season: 2014
- Organising body: Rugby Australia
- No. of teams: 8 (2019)
- Country: Australia; Fiji
- Most recent champion: Western Force (2019)
- Most titles: Brisbane City (2 titles)
- Broadcaster: Fox Sports Australia
- Related competitions: Super Rugby

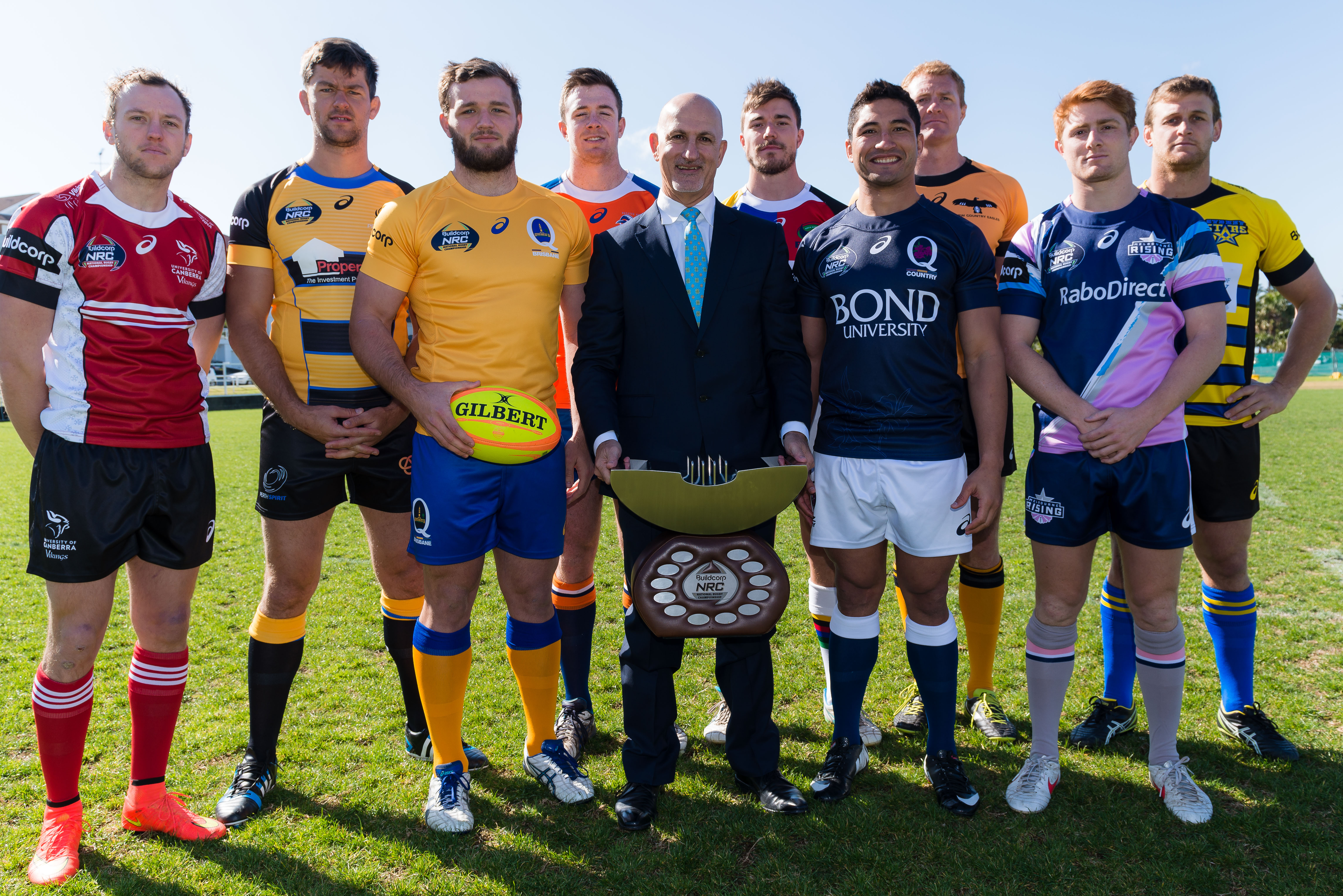
Competition launch in 2014.

The National Rugby Championship (NRC) was an Australian rugby union competition. It was contested by eight teams, seven from Australia and one from Fiji. The tournament ran from 2014 until 2019 before being disbanded in 2020 following the change of the Australian rugby TV broadcasting deal from Fox Sports, who had funded the competition, to Stan Sport. The 2020 competition was cancelled due to the COVID-19 pandemic.

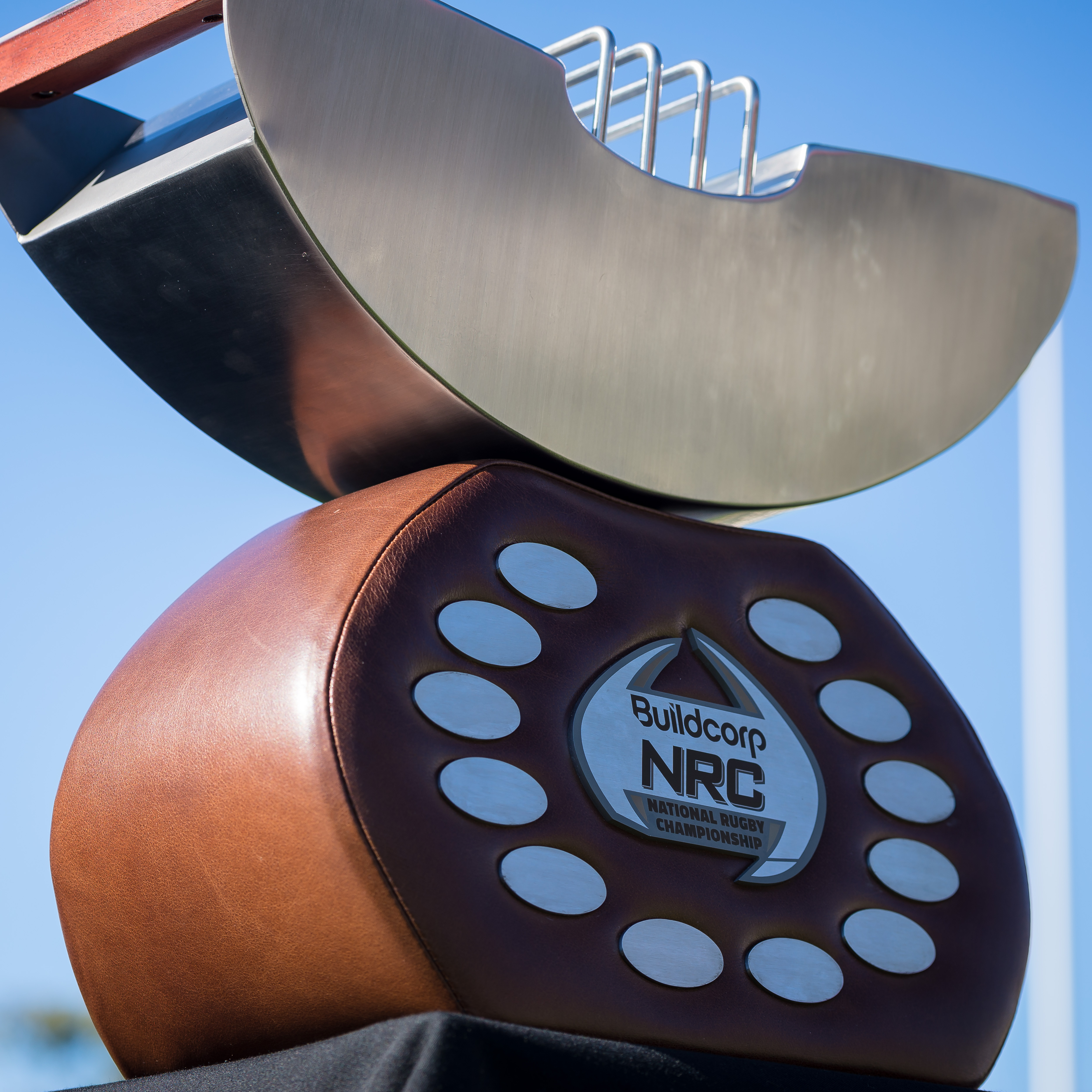
NRC trophy

== Background and history ==
Buildcorp NRC logo used 2014–2016.

In December 2013, the ARU announced that Australia would get another tier of competition under Super Rugby in line with South Africa’s Currie Cup and New Zealand's National Provincial Championship (NPC). Eleven bids were tendered from teams wanting to participate in the tournament, with nine being accepted. Applicants that were not successful were advised that they could bid again as the competition matured, as early as 2015.

The National Rugby Championship followed a previous national competition, the Australian Rugby Championship, that was abandoned after the first season in 2007 due to financial losses.

The construction company Buildcorp was the inaugural naming rights sponsor for the NRC competition, with other partners including Intercontinental Hotels, Qantas, and Allianz also signed. ASICS was the official apparel supplier for the first two seasons. Matches were played under approved law variations, intended to increase the speed of the game.

A new broadcasting deal agreed in 2015 secured the funding and future of the competition until the end of the 2020 season. The competition was reduced from nine teams to eight when the ARU did not renew the NRC licence for the Sydney Stars in 2016, citing insufficient player talent to support four competitive teams in New South Wales.

A team from Fiji, the Fijian Drua, joined the competition for the 2017 season. For the 2018 season, the Greater Sydney Rams were dropped from the competition, leaving Sydney with just one team, the Rays.

Following the onset of the COVID-19 pandemic, the competition was cancelled for the 2020 season, with the Australian Super Rugby sides playing out the Super Rugby AU competition in 2020–2021. However, once Super Rugby Pacific commenced in 2023, calls for a replacement 'third-tier' competition in Australian rugby grew.

In 2023, Force CEO Tony Lewis told The Sydney Morning Herald that an Australian third-tier competition was a necessity, stating: "All the Super coaches [in Australia] who participated in that third-tier comp [the NRC] that was running before COVID... all waxed lyrical about how good a competition it was and the number of coaches that come through it, and the number of S+C coaches [strength and conditioning], the number of analysts, the number of players. So it's just not about players, it's about coaches, about analysts, about physios. If you're not preparing them for the next level, the jump is horrendous. The first time you do economics, they do needs and wants."

Following reports of several revived concepts in 2024, a new domestic competition was officially confirmed to be in the works by Rugby Australia CEO Phil Waugh in December that year. Subsequently, in June 2025 Super Rugby AUS was announced as the new domestic competition between the four Australian Super Rugby sides, with its first season commencing in September that year following the conclusion of the premier grade club season.

=== Format ===
The National Rugby Championship was usually held between late August and early November. A round-robin tournament was scheduled first where each team played all others once. The top four teams progressed to the championship playoffs consisting of two semi-final knockout matches and a grand final to determine the champion team and winner of the NRC Trophy, nicknamed 'The Toast Rack'.

During the round-robin section of the tournament, teams would also play for the Horan-Little Shield, a challenge trophy put on the line by the holders when a challenge match was accepted or mandated according to the Shield rules.

== Teams ==
The teams that competed in the National Rugby Championship were.

Region	Team	Seasons	Associated union / teams
Australian Capital Territory	Canberra Vikings (Note: Known as University of Canberra Vikings from 2014–2016.)	2014–2019	ACT and Southern NSW Rugby / Brumbies, Tuggeranong Vikings
Fiji	Fijian Drua	2017–2019	Fiji Rugby Union
New South Wales	Greater Sydney Rams (Note: Known as the Western Sydney Rams for 2016.)	2014–2017	New South Wales Rugby / Eastwood, Parramatta, Penrith, Southern Districts, West Harbour
New South Wales	New South Wales Country Eagles	2014–2019	New South Wales Country Rugby / Sydney University, (Note: Sydney University, previously with Sydney Stars before their license was cancelled, formed a partnership with New South Wales Country Eagles in 2016.) Waratahs
New South Wales	Sydney (Note: Known as North Harbour Rays from 2014–2015 and Sydney Rays from 2016–2018.)	2014–2019	New South Wales Rugby / Waratahs
New South Wales	Sydney Stars	2014–2015	New South Wales Rugby / Balmain, Sydney University
Queensland	Brisbane City	2014–2019	Queensland Rugby / Reds
Queensland	Queensland Country	2014–2019	Queensland Rugby / Reds
Victoria	Melbourne Rising	2014–2019	Rugby Victoria / Rebels
Western Australia	Perth Spirit	2014–2017	RugbyWA / Force
Western Australia	Western Force	2018–2019	RugbyWA / Force

== Seasons ==
=== Results ===
Ed.	Year	Final			Semi-finalists		No. teams
Ed.	Year	Winner	Score / Venue	Runner-up			No. teams
1	2014	Brisbane City	37–26; Ballymore Stadium	Perth Spirit	NSW Country Eagles	Melbourne Rising	9
2	2015	Brisbane City	21–10; Ballymore Stadium	Canberra Vikings	Melbourne Rising	Sydney Stars	9
3	2016	Perth Spirit	20–16; Scully Park	NSW Country Eagles	Melbourne Rising	Sydney Rays	8
4	2017	Queensland Country	42–28; Viking Park	Canberra Vikings	Perth Spirit	Fijian Drua	9
5	2018	Fijian Drua	36–26; Churchill Park	Queensland Country	Canberra Vikings	Western Force	8
6	2019	Western Force	41–3; UWA Sports Park	Canberra Vikings	Brisbane City	Fijian Drua	8
—N/a	2020	Cancelled due to impacts of the COVID-19 pandemic.					8

=== Results summary ===
Team	Champion	Runner-up	Semi-finalist
Brisbane City	2 (2014, 2015)	—N/a	1 (2019)
Perth Spirit	1 (2016)	1 (2014)	1 (2017)
Queensland Country	1 (2017)	1 (2018)	—N/a
Fijian Drua	1 (2018)	—N/a	2 (2017, 2019)
Western Force	1 (2019)	—N/a	1 (2018)
Canberra Vikings	—N/a	3 (2015, 2017, 2019)	1 (2018)
NSW Country Eagles	—N/a	1 (2016)	1 (2014)
Melbourne Rising	—N/a	—N/a	3 (2014, 2015, 2016)
Sydney Stars	—N/a	—N/a	1 (2015)
Sydney Rays	—N/a	—N/a	1 (2016)

=== Results summary by region ===
Region	Champion	Runner-up	Semi-finalist
Queensland	3 (2014, 2015, 2017)	1 (2018)	1 (2019)
Western Australia	2 (2016, 2019)	1 (2014)	2 (2017, 2018)
Fiji	1 (2018)	—N/a	2 (2017, 2019)
Australian Capital Territory	—N/a	3 (2015, 2017, 2019)	1 (2018)
New South Wales	—N/a	1 (2016)	3 (2014, 2015, 2016)
Victoria	—N/a	—N/a	3 (2014, 2015, 2016)

== Sponsorship and broadcasting ==
The tournament is run by Rugby Australia with the sponsorship of Foxtel which provides television coverage on its Fox Sports channels. Gilbert is the official supplier of all rugby balls.

Two of the NRC matches each weekend were broadcast live via Fox Sports, with the remaining matches shown on the Fox Sports streaming platform. Discussion of the NRC competition was included on Fox Sports' review show NRC Extra Time on Monday nights, and the Kick & Chase program on Tuesday evenings.

== See also ==
- Australian Rugby Championship (predecessor competition)
- Super Rugby AUS (successor competition)
- Australian Rugby Shield (defunct)
- Super Rugby
- Super W
