= Scrivener (disambiguation) =

A scrivener is a professional scribe.

Scrivener may also refer to:

- Scrivener (surname)
- Scrivener Dam, a dam in Canberra, Australia
- Scrivener Glacier, a glacier in Antarctica
- Scrivener (software), a text-editing application
- Worshipful Company of Scriveners, a livery company or Guild of the City of London

== See also ==
- "Bartleby, the Scrivener", 1853 short story by Herman Melville
