= History of Lake Burley Griffin =

Notable events in the history of the artificial water body in Canberra

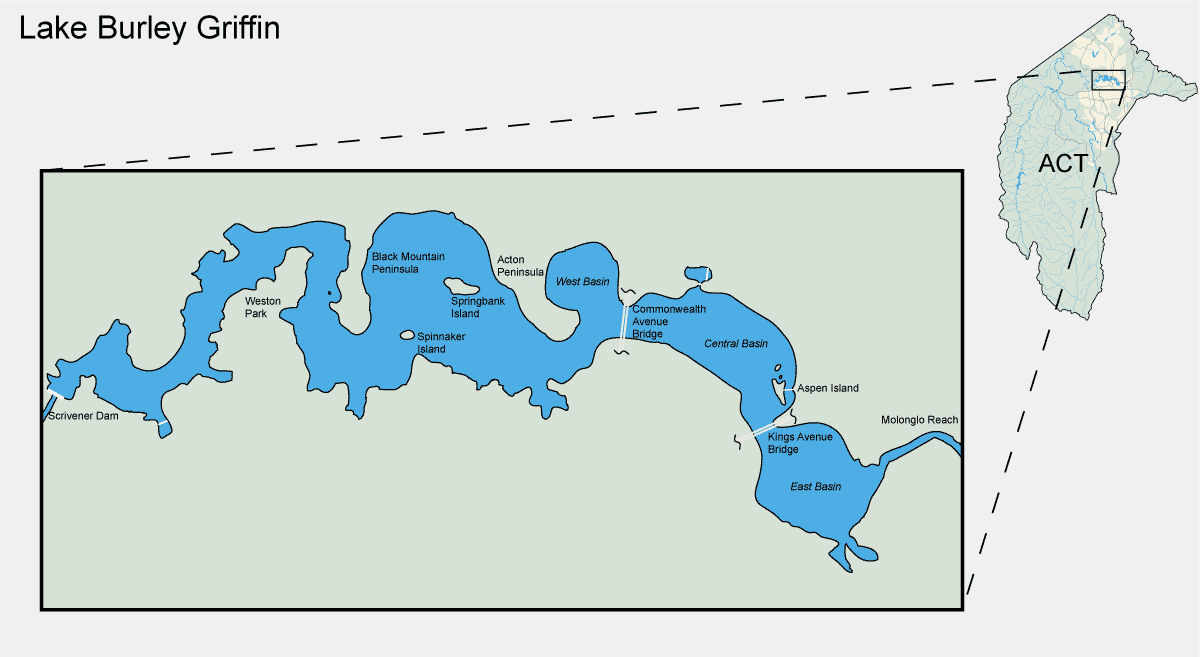
Map of Lake Burley Griffin

The history of Lake Burley Griffin, an artificial body of water in Canberra, the capital of Australia, is highly complex. Following its initial design in the 1910s, extensive political disputes occurred until it was finally built in the 1960s.

== History ==
Charles Scrivener (1855–1923) recommended the site for Canberra in 1909, which was to be a planned capital city for the country. One of the reasons for the location's selection was its ability to store water "for ornamental purposes at reasonable cost".

In 1911, a competition for the design of Canberra was launched, Scrivener's detailed survey of the area was supplied to the competing architects. The Molonglo River flowed through the site, which was a flood plain, and most of the proposals included artificial bodies of water.

=== Walter Burley Griffin's design ===
The American architect Walter Burley Griffin (1876–1937) won the contest and was invited to Australia to oversee the construction of the nation's new capital. Griffin's proposal, which had an abundance of geometric patterns, incorporated concentric hexagonal and octagonal streets emanating from several radii.

His lake design was at the heart of the city and consisted of a central basin in the shape of circular segment, a western and eastern basin, which were approximately circular, and a western and eastern lake, which were much larger and irregularly shaped, at either side of the system.

The lakes were deliberately designed so that their orientation was related to various topographical landmarks in Canberra. The lakes stretched from east to west and divided the city in two; a land axis perpendicular to the central basin stretched from Capital Hill—the future location of the new Parliament House on a mound on the southern side—north northeast across the central basin to the northern banks along Anzac Avenue to the Australian War Memorial . This was designed so that looking from Capital Hill, the War Memorial stood directly at the foot of Mount Ainslie. At the southwestern end of the land axis was Bimberi Peak.

The straight edge of the circular segment that formed the central basin was designated the water axis, and it extended northwest towards Black Mountain, the highest point in Canberra. A line parallel to the water axis, on the northern side of the city, was designated the municipal axis. The municipal axis became the location of Constitution Avenue, which linked City Hill in Civic Centre and Market Centre. Commonwealth Avenue and Kings Avenue were to run from the southern side from Capital Hill to City Hill and Market Centre on the north respectively, and they formed the western and eastern edges of the central basin. The area enclosed by the three avenues was known as the Parliamentary Triangle, and was to form the centrepiece of Griffin's work.

Later, Scrivener, as part of a government design committee, was responsible for modifying Griffin's winning design. He recommended changing the shape of the lake from Griffin's very geometric shapes to a much more organic one using a single dam, unlike Griffin's series of weirs. The new design included elements from several of the best design submissions and was widely criticised as being ugly. The new plan for the lake retained Griffin's three formal basins: east, central, and west, though in a more relaxed form.

Griffin entered into correspondence with the government over the plan and its alternatives, and he was invited to Canberra to discuss the matter. Griffin arrived in August 1913 and was appointed Federal Capital Director of Design and Construction for three years.

The plans were varied again in the following years, but the design of Lake Burley Griffin remained based largely on the original committee's plan. It was later gazetted and legally protected by the federal parliament in 1926. However, Griffin had a strained working relationship with the Australian authorities and a lack of federal government meant that by the time he left in 1920, little significant work had been done on the city.

=== Political disputes and modifications ===
With the onset of the Great Depression, followed by World War II, development of the new capital was slow, and in the decade after the end of the war, Canberra was criticised for resembling a village, and its disorganised collection of buildings were deemed ugly.

During this time, the Molonglo flowed through the flood basin, with only a small fraction of the water envisaged in Griffin's plan. The centre of his capital city mostly consisted of farmland, with small settlements—mostly wooden, temporary and ad hoc—on either side. There was little evidence that Canberra was planned, and the lake and Parliamentary Triangle at the heart of Griffin's plan was but a paddock. Royal Canberra Golf Course, and Acton Racecourse and a sports ground were located on the pastoral land, and people had to disperse the livestock before playing sport. A rubbish dump stood on the northern banks of the location of central basin, and no earth had been moved since Griffin's departure three decades earlier.

In 1950, the eastern lake—the largest component—was eliminated upon the advice of the National Capital Planning and Development Committee (NCPDC). The rationale given was that around 1,700 acres (6.9 km^{2}) of farmland would be submerged and that the Molonglo would have insufficient water to keep the lake filled.

In 1953, the NCPDC excised the western lake from its plans and replaced it with a winding stream, which was 110 m wide and covered around a fifth of the original area. As the NCPDC had only advisory powers, this change was attributed to the influence of senior officials in the Ministry of the Interior who felt that Griffin's plan was too grandiose. Advocates of watered-down scheme thought it was more economical and saved 350 hectares of land for development. However, according to engineering reports that were ignored, the smaller plan would actually cost more money and require a more complicated structure of dams that would in any case be less able to prevent flooding.

Initially, there was little opposition during the consultation period before the alterations were made. However, opposition to the reduction of the water area grew. The process that resulted in the alteration was criticised for being non-transparent and sneaky. Some organizations complained that they were not given an opportunity to express their opinion before the change was gazetted, and many politicians and the chief town planner were not informed. Critics bitterly insinuated that politically influential members of the Royal Canberra Golf Club, whose course was situated on the location of the proposed western lake, were responsible for the change in policy.

The Parliamentary Public Works Committee advised the Parliament to restore the western lake. After an inquiry in late 1954, it concluded that

The West Lake is desirable and practicable. It was eliminated from the Canberra plan by the Department of the Interior without adequate investigation by the National Capital Planning and Development Committee and replaced by a ribbon of water scheme involving a capitalised cost or nearly L3 million more. The lake should be restored to the plan, and the necessary Ministerial action is recommended as soon as possible.

Prime Minister Robert Menzies, the longest serving, and regarded as the most powerful head of government in Australian history, regarded the state of the national capital as an embarrassment. Over time his attitude changed from one of contempt to that of championing its development. He fired two ministers charged with the development of the city, feeling that their performance lacked intensity.

In 1958, the newly created National Capital Development Commission (NCDC), which had been given more power by Menzies, restored the western lake to their plans, and it was formally gazetted in October 1959. The NCDC also blocked a plan by the Department of Works to build a bridge across the lake along the land axis between Parliament House and the War Memorial contrary to Griffin's plans.

A powerful Senate Select Committee oversaw the NCDC and renowned British architect William Holford was brought in to fine-tune Griffin's original plans. He changed the central basin's geometry so that it was no longer a segment of circle; he converted the southern straight edge into a polygonal shape with three edges and inserted a gulf on the northern shore. The result was closer to Scrivener's modified design some decades earlier.

== Construction ==
In 1958, engineers conducted studies into the hydrology and structural requirements needed for the building of the dam. Modelling based on the data collection suggested that the water level could be kept within a metre of the intended level of 556 m above sea level in the case of a flood.

In February 1959, formal authority to begin construction was granted. However, while Menzies was on holidays, some officials from the Department of Treasury convinced ministers to withhold money needed for the lake, so the start of the construction was delayed. Once it started, progress was fast. At its peak, the personnel physically working on the construction in the lakes were in the 400–500 range. John Overall, the commissioner of the NCDC promised Menzies that the work would be finished within four years, and he succeeded, despite the prime minister's scepticism. Equipment was quickly requisitioned.

After the lengthy political wrangling over the design had passed, the criticism of the scheme died down. Menzies strongly denounced the "moaning" by opponents of the lake. Most critics decried the project as a waste of money that should have been spent on essential services across Australia. Less strident concerns centred on the potentially negative effects of the lake, such as mosquitoes and ecological degeneration.

=== Lakes, islands and foreshore ===
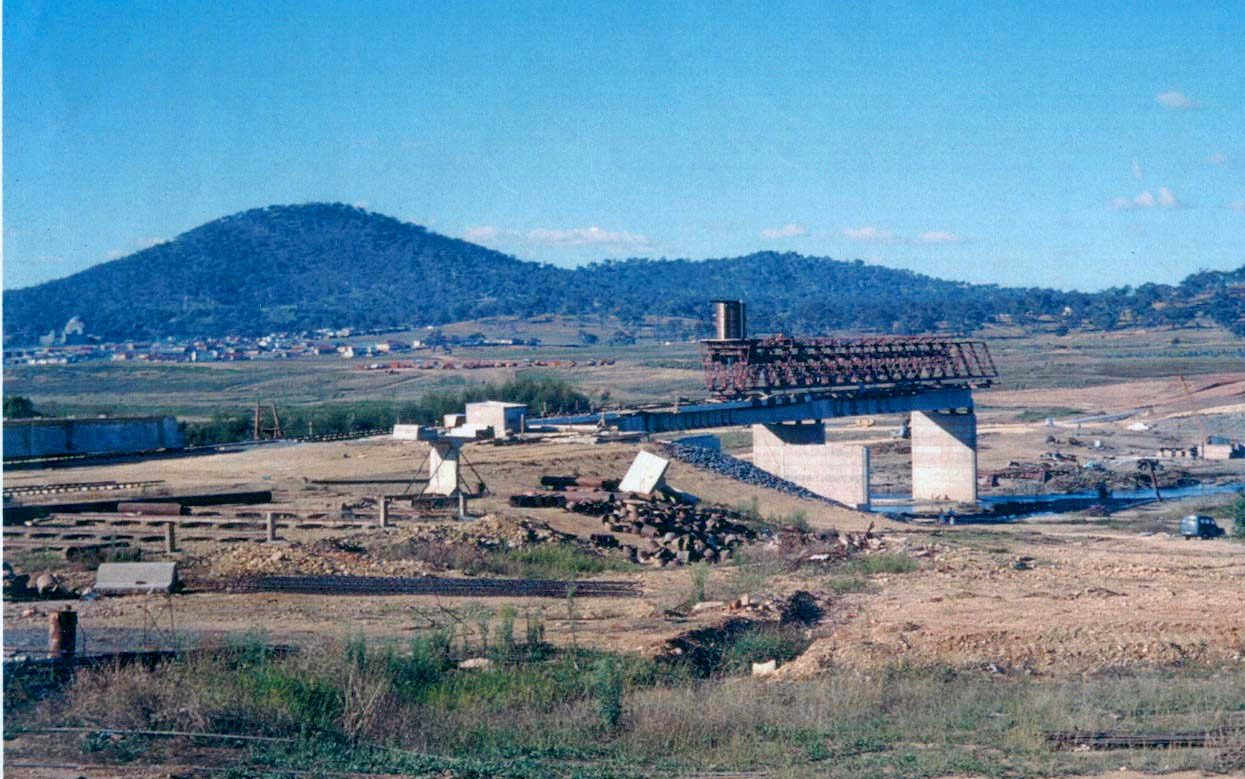
Southern end of Kings Avenue Bridge under construction with the Australian War Memorial at far left c. 1961

The excavation of Lake Burley Griffin began in 1960 with the clearing of vegetation from the floodplain of the Molonglo River. The trees on the golf course and along the river were pulled up, along with the various sports grounds and houses.

During major earthworks, at least 382,000 cubic metres of topsoil excavated. it was collected for use at several public parks and gardens, including the future Commonwealth Park on the northern shore. It was also used to create the six artificial islands including Springbank Island. The island was named after the former Springbank Farm that was situated there. Land excavated to create a sailing course at Yarralumla was used to create the thematically-named Spinnaker Island to its north, while excavated stone was moved beside the Kings Avenue Bridge at the eastern edge of the central basin to form Aspen Island.

Care was taken to excavate the entire lake floor to a depth of at least two metres to provide sufficient clearance for boat keels. Another reason given for this was that mosquitoes would not breed nor would weeds grow at such a depth.

During the following phase of work, four types of lake margin were constructed:

- Low reinforced concrete retaining walls can be seen on the southern side of the Central Basin.
- Grouted rock wall can be seen on the eastern side of Central Basin nearest Commonwealth Park, as well as much of the Eastern Basin.
- Sand and gravel beaches are designed to cater for lakeside recreational pursuits. These are mostly prevalent on the western half of the lake complex.
- Rocky outcrops, steeply sloping stable shores with water vegetation such as bullrushes. This treatment is evident in the Western Lake in Yarralumla.

=== Bridges ===
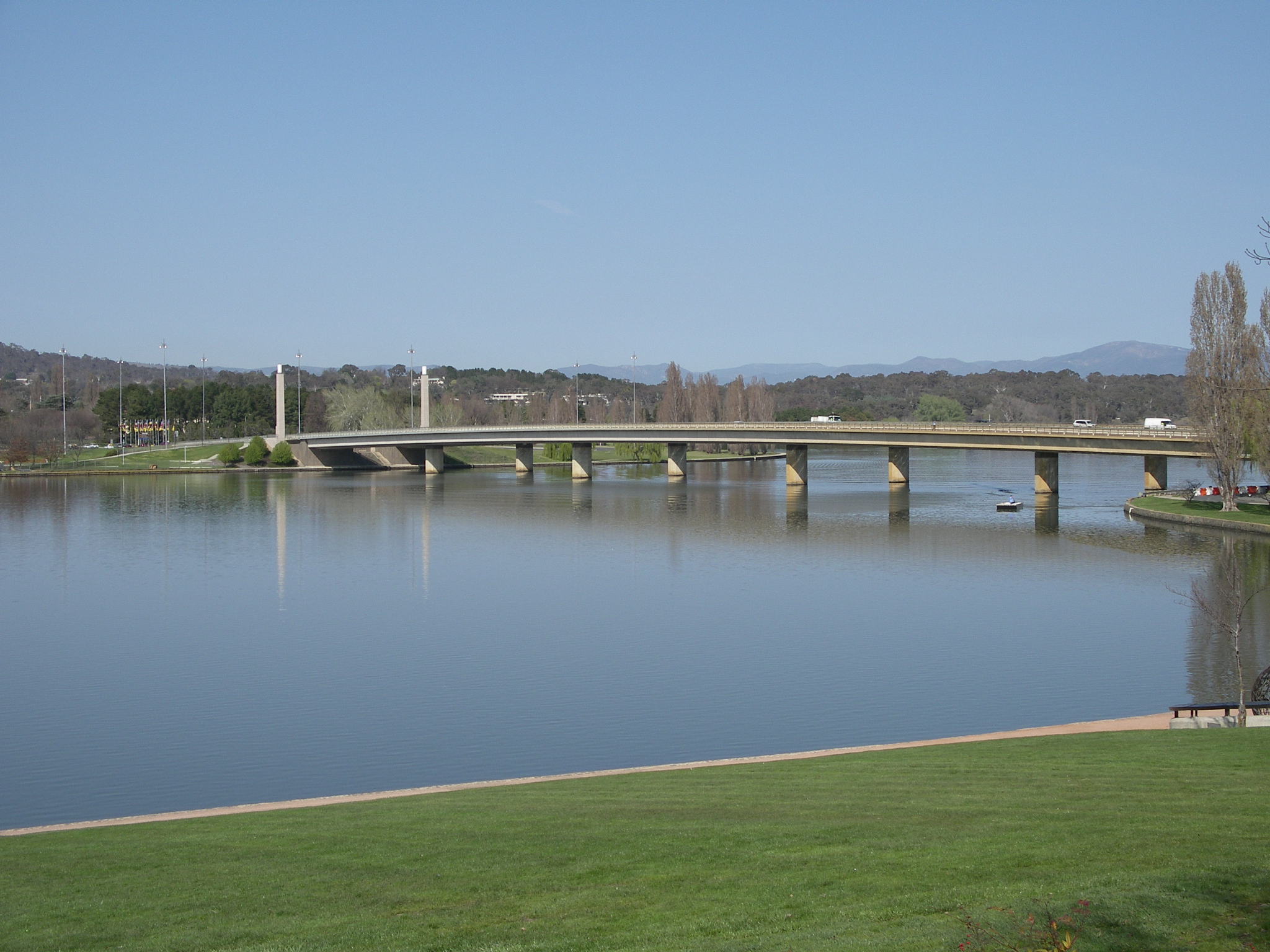
Commonwealth Avenue Bridge, 2005

Lake Burley Griffin is crossed by Commonwealth Avenue Bridge (310 m), Kings Avenue Bridge (270 m) and a roadway over Scrivener Dam. The two bridges were constructed before the lake was filled, and replaced wooden structures. They are designed to allow the passage of recreational sailing boats with tall masts.

Site testing for both the Commonwealth Avenue and Kings Avenue bridges took place during late 1959 to early 1960. The construction of the Kings Avenue Bridge began in 1960, followed by Commonwealth Avenue Bridge the year after. Luckily for the builders, Canberra was in a drought and the ground remained dry during construction.

Both bridges are made of concrete and steel and are dual-carriageway; Commonwealth Avenue has three lanes in each direction while Kings Avenue has two.

Kings Avenue Bridge opened on 10 March 1962. Prime Minister Menzies unlocked a ceremonial change before the motorcade and pageant crossed the lake in front of a large crowd. Commonwealth Avenue Bridge opened in 1963 without an official ceremony. Menzies called it "the finest building in the national capital".

=== Dam ===
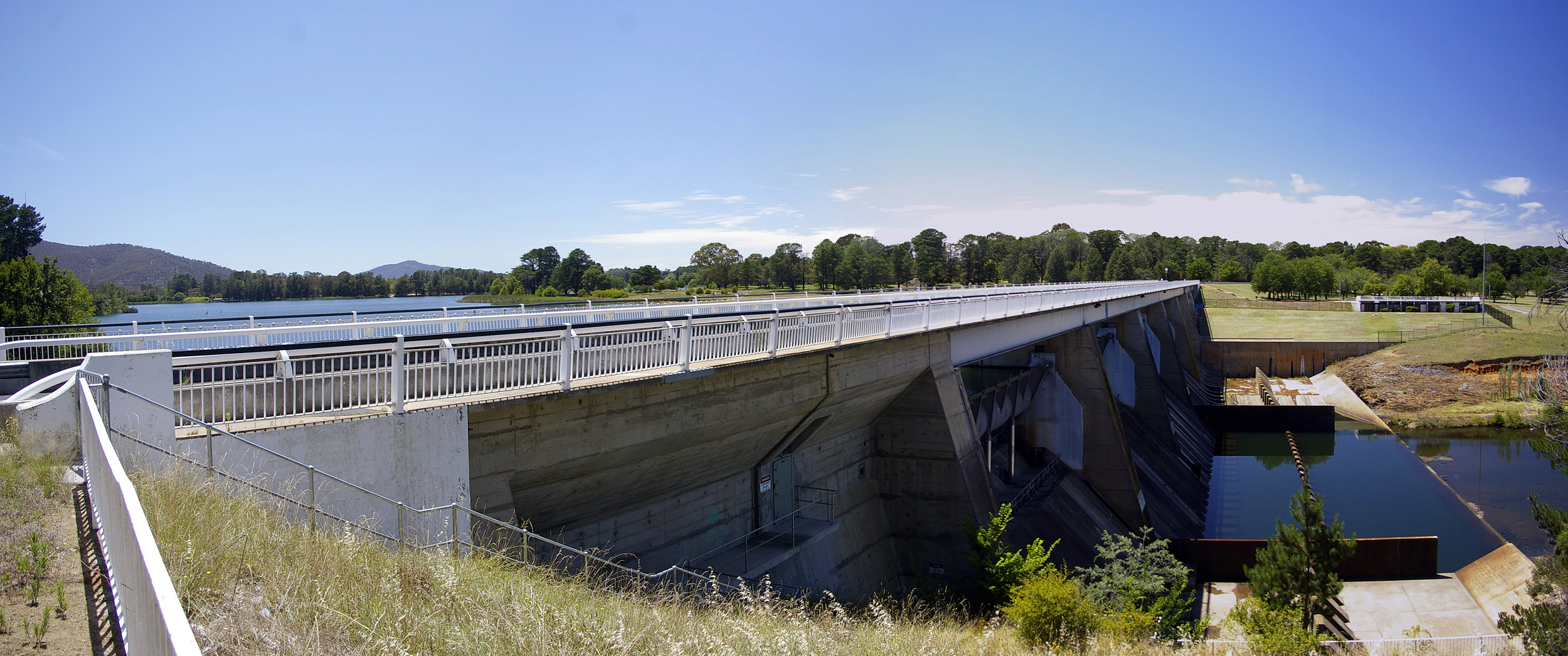
Scrivener Dam, near the National Zoo & Aquarium in Yarralumla, 2009

The dam that holds back the waters of Lake Burley Griffin was named Scrivener Dam after Charles Scrivener. The dam was designed in Germany. About 55,000 cubic metres (1,900,000 cu ft) of concrete was used in its construction. The dam is 33 metres (108 ft) high and 319 metres (1,047 ft) long with a maximum wall thickness of 19.7 metres (65 ft). The dam is designed to handle a once in 5,000-year flood event.

It utilised state-of-the-art post-tensioning techniques to cope with any problems or movements in the riverbed.

The dam has five bay spillway controlled by 30.5 metres (100 ft) wide, hydraulically operated fish-belly flap gates. The fish-belly gates allow for a precise control of water level, reducing the dead area on the banks between high and low water levels. As at November 2010, the five gates have only been opened simultaneously once in the dam's history, during heavy flooding in 1976.

Lady Denman Drive, a roadway atop the dam wall provides a third road crossing for the lake. It consists of a roadway and a bicycle path. This was possible because the dam gates are closed by pushing up from below, unlike most previous designs that wherein the gates were lifted from above.

=== Lake filling ===
A prolonged drought coincided with and eased work on the lake's construction. The valves on the Scrivener Dam were closed on 20 September 1963 by Interior Minister Gordon Freeth; Menzies was absent due to ill health. Several months on, with no rain in sight, mosquito-infested pools of water were the only visible sign of the lake filling. With the eventual breaking of the drought and several days of heavy rain, the lake filled, and reached the planned level on 29 April 1964.

On 17 October 1964, Menzies commemorated the filling of the lake and the completion of stage one with an opening ceremony amid the backdrop of sailing craft. This was accompanied by fireworks display, and Griffin's lake had finally come to fruition after five decades, at the cost of $5 million.

Freeth suggested that Menzies had "been in a material sense the father of the lake" and that the lake should be named after him. Menzies insisted that the lake should be named after Griffin, who had no existing monument in Canberra. (Griffin usually referred to himself as Walter Griffin, but the form "Walter Burley Griffin" has become established in Australia.)

In times of severe drought, Lake Burley Griffin's water level can fall unacceptably low and when this happens, a release of water from Googong Dam located upstream could be scheduled to top up and restore the lake water level.

The Googong Dam is located on the Queanbeyan River which is a tributary of the Molonglo River. The dam whose construction was finished in 1979 is one of four dams—the Cotter, Bendora, and Corin Dams are the others—that meet the water supply needs of the Canberra and Queanbeyan region. The Googong dam's water carrying capacity is 124,500 million litres.
