= Scrivener (surname) =

- Anthony Scrivener (1935–2015), English barrister
- Charles Scrivener (1855–1923), Australian surveyor
- Christiane Scrivener (1925–2024), French politician
- Chuck Scrivener (born 1947), American Major League Baseball shortstop
- Colin Scrivener (born 1970), Canadian football player
- Frederick Henry Ambrose Scrivener (1813–1891), English scholar of the New Testament
- Glen Scrivener (born 1967), Canadian former football player
- Jeremy Scrivener (born 1965), Australian actor
- Karen Scrivener (born 1958), English scientist
- Margaret Scrivener (1922–1997), Canadian politician
- Matthew Scrivener (1580–1609), English colonist
- Nick Scrivener (born 1970), Australian professional rugby union coach and former player
