= Leslie Leuluaʻialiʻi-Makin =

Australian rugby union player

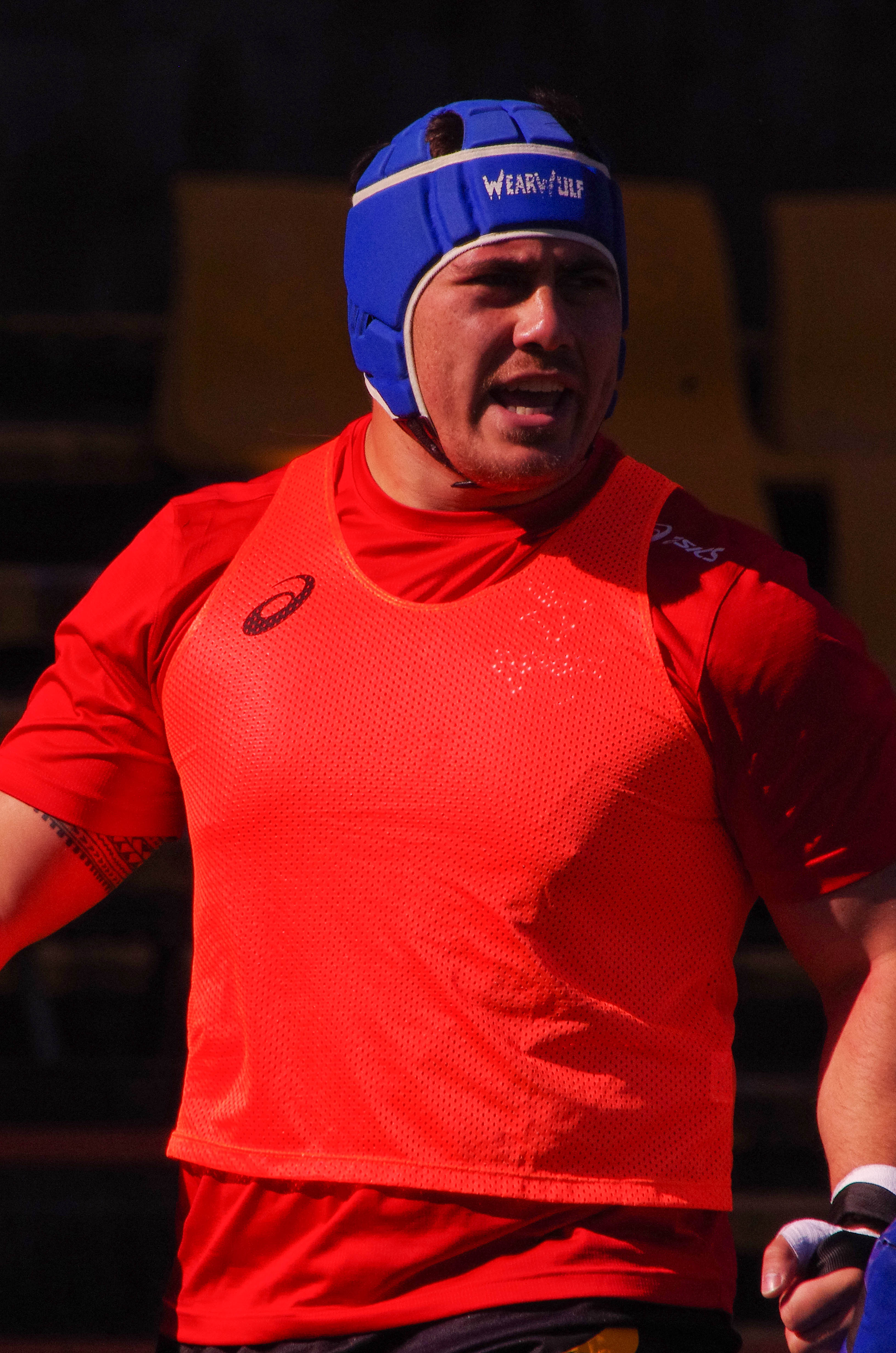
- Full name: Leslie Leuluaʻialiʻi-Makin
- Born: 2 January 1992 (age 34) Canberra, Australia
- Height: 1.74 m (5 ft 9 in)
- Weight: 112 kg (17 st 9 lb; 247 lb)

Rugby union career
- Position: Loosehead Prop
- Current team: LA Giltinis
Amateur team(s)
| Years | Team | Apps | (Points) |
| 2012− | Queanbeyan Whites | | |
Senior career
| Years | Team | Apps | (Points) |
| 2014–2019 | Canberra Vikings | 32 | (15) |
| 2015–2019 | Brumbies | 50 | (0) |
| 2020– | Kurita Water Gush | 6 | (5) |
- Correct as of 22 February 2021
International career
| Years | Team | Apps | (Points) |
| 2012 | Australia Under-20 | 4 | (0) |
- Correct as of 22 February 2021

Leslie Leuluaʻialiʻi-Makin (born 2 January 1992) is an Australian rugby union player who currently plays as a prop for the LA Giltinis in Major League Rugby (MLR). He previously played for the Brumbies in Super Rugby. He also represented the Canberra Vikings in the inaugural National Rugby Championship.

== Career ==
Makin has come all the way through the ranks in the ACT, representing the region at Under 16, Schools, Under 20, State (ACT XV) and 10s level. He was a member of the newly founded Canberra Vikings squad for the first ever National Rugby Championship season in 2014 and his performances anchoring the scrum for the Vikings earned him a Super Rugby contract with the Brumbies for 2015.

== International career ==
Makin was a member of the Australia Under-20 side which competed in the 2012 IRB Junior World Championship in South Africa.

== Personal life ==
Makin was born in Canberra to a Canadian father and a Samoan mother.

== Super Rugby statistics ==
As of 25 July 2016

| Season | Team | Games | Starts | Sub | Mins | Tries | Cons | Pens | Drops | Points | Yel | Red |
|---|---|---|---|---|---|---|---|---|---|---|---|---|
| 2015 | Brumbies | 0 | 0 | 0 | 0 | 0 | 0 | 0 | 0 | 0 | 0 | 0 |
| 2016 | Brumbies | 10 | 0 | 10 | 332 | 0 | 0 | 0 | 0 | 0 | 0 | 0 |
| Total | | 10 | 0 | 10 | 332 | 0 | 0 | 0 | 0 | 0 | 0 | 0 |
