= Karen Scrivener =

Material scientist specialised in cement and concrete

Karen Louise Scrivener
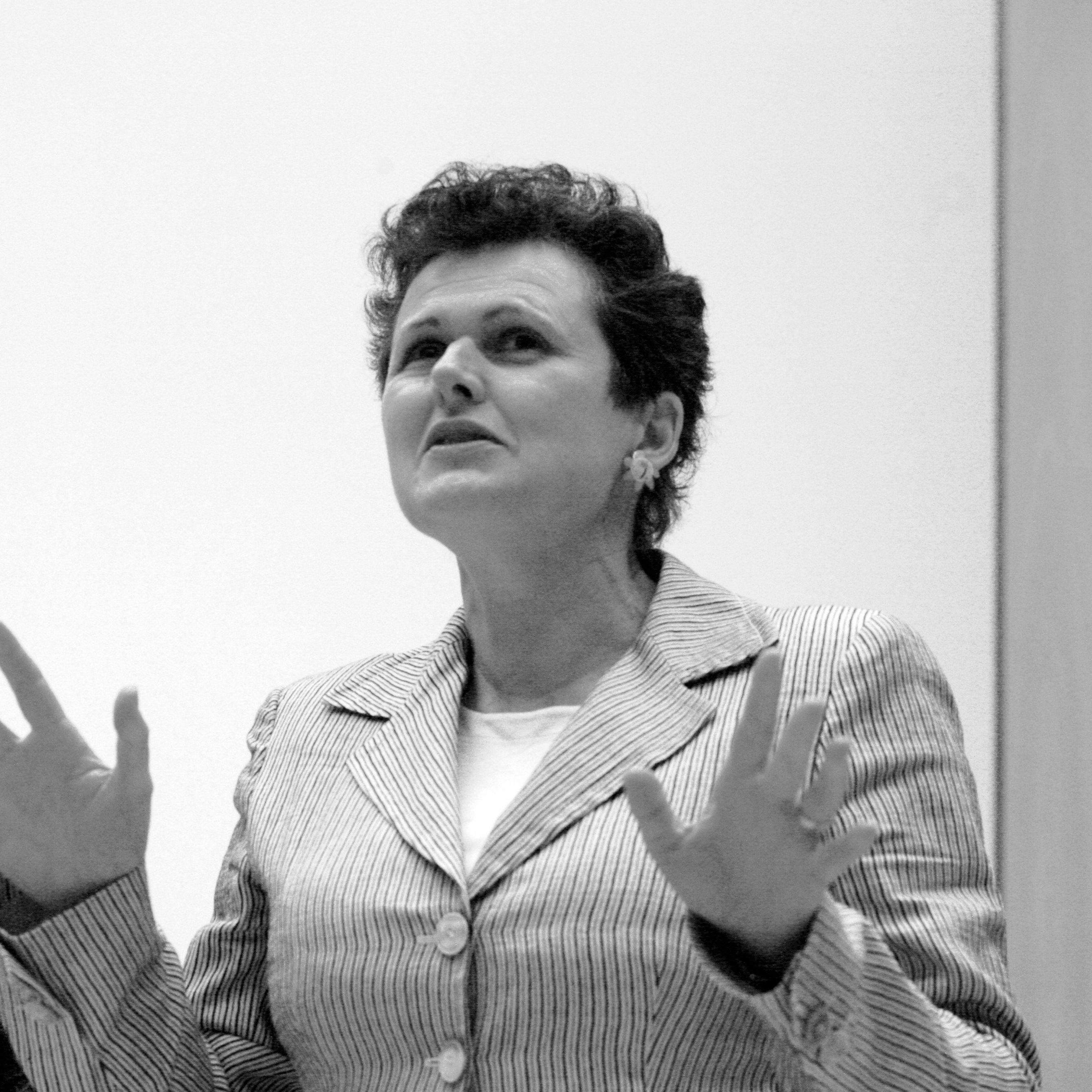
- Born: 21 August 1958 (age 68); England
- Education: Cambridge University, Imperial College London
- Known for: Cement, Construction Materials
- Awards: Klaus Dyckerhoff Prize (2007) (2007); Kroll Medal (2010); Della Roy Lecture (2011)
- Scientific career
- Fields: Construction Materials, Cement Sustainability
- Workplaces: École Polytechnique Fédérale de Lausanne
- Website: people.epfl.ch/karen.scrivener

Karen Louise Scrivener is a material chemist known for her pioneering works in cementitious materials. She is the head of Laboratory of Construction Materials at Ecole Polytechnique Fédérale de Lausanne and served as the editor-in-chief of the Cement and Concrete Research journal for 15 years.

== Early life and education ==
In 1980, she graduated from the Cambridge University in Material Sciences. She earned her PhD in Materials Science from the Imperial College London in 1983 on the development of microstructure during the hydration of Portland cement under the supervision of Professor P. L. Pratt.

== Career ==
Scrivener worked at the Imperial College of London in the Department of Materials science until 1995 as a post-doctoral research assistant, Warren research fellow of the Royal Society and lecturer. In 1995 she decided to leave academia and joined the Central Research Laboratory of Lafarge near Lyon in France where she was a Senior Scientist and then Head of Calcium Aluminates Department. Since 2001 she has been a Full Professor and head of the Laboratory of Construction Materials in the Institute of Materials Science and Engineering at EPFL, Ecole Polytechnique Fédérale de Lausanne, Switzerland.

In 2005, she became the editor in chief of the peer-reviewed journal Cement and Concrete Research, and has since become a member of its Honorary Editorial Board. Karen Scrivener was elected Fellow of the Royal Academy of Engineering in 2014.

Scrivener plays an active role in promoting sustainable cements, in the form of blended cements. She co-authored with Vanderley M. John and Ellis M. Gartner with the support of the UNEP-SBCI (The United Nations Environment Programme - Sustainable Building and Climate Initiative), a reference report summarizing the main conclusions on the most viable low-CO_{2}, eco-efficient cement-based materials for the future of construction.

In 2004, she founded Nanocem, a consortium of 23 academic and 10 industrial partners interested in fundamental research of cement and concrete and still serves as the principal coordinator. In collaboration with the Universidad Las Villas of Santa Clara, IIT Delhi, the Swiss Development and Cooperation and many international cement producers, she developed the LC3 project (Limestone Calcined Clay Cement) to produce a new type of low cost and low carbon cement

== Honours and awards ==
- 1991: Leslie Holiday prize of the Institute of Materials
- 2007: Klaus Dyckerhoff Prize (2007) for outstanding lifetime contribution to the field of cement and concrete research
- 2010: Doctor Honoris Causa, Czech Technical University
- 2010: "Concrete Ambassador" of UK Concrete Society
- 2010: Kroll Medal and Prize of UK Institute of Materials, Minerals and Mining
- 2011: Della Roy Lecture award, American Ceramic Society
- 2014: Fellow of the Royal Academy of Engineering (UK)
- 2017: Honorary Fellow of the Institute of Concrete Technology
- 2022: Member of Council of Engineers for Energy Transition (CEET), United Nations
- 2024: Appointed as part of the 10-Member Group to Promote Science, Technology and Innovation for Sustainable Development Goals, United Nations
- 2024: Honorary Doctorate, Eindhoven University of Technology (NL)
