= John Ross (rugby union) =

Australian rugby union player & coach

John Ross (born 6 March 1967) is an Australian former rugby union footballer and coach.

== Career ==
Ross played for the Wallabies, the Brumbies, the ACT Kookaburras and the Australian A team.

He went to Scotland to coach the Peebles team. In 2006 he was coach of the Brumbies.

== Credentials ==
=== Playing career ===
- Royals (Canberra)
- ARFU President's XV
- ACT Kookaburra
- ACT Brumbies
- Australia A
- Wallabies (toured but not capped)

=== Coaching career ===
- Peebles, Scotland
- ACT Academy
- ACT brumbie Runners
- Australia U19
- Canberra Vikings ARC
- Easts Rugby Club Canberra
