= Commonwealth Avenue Bridge =

Parallel bridges in Canberra, Australia

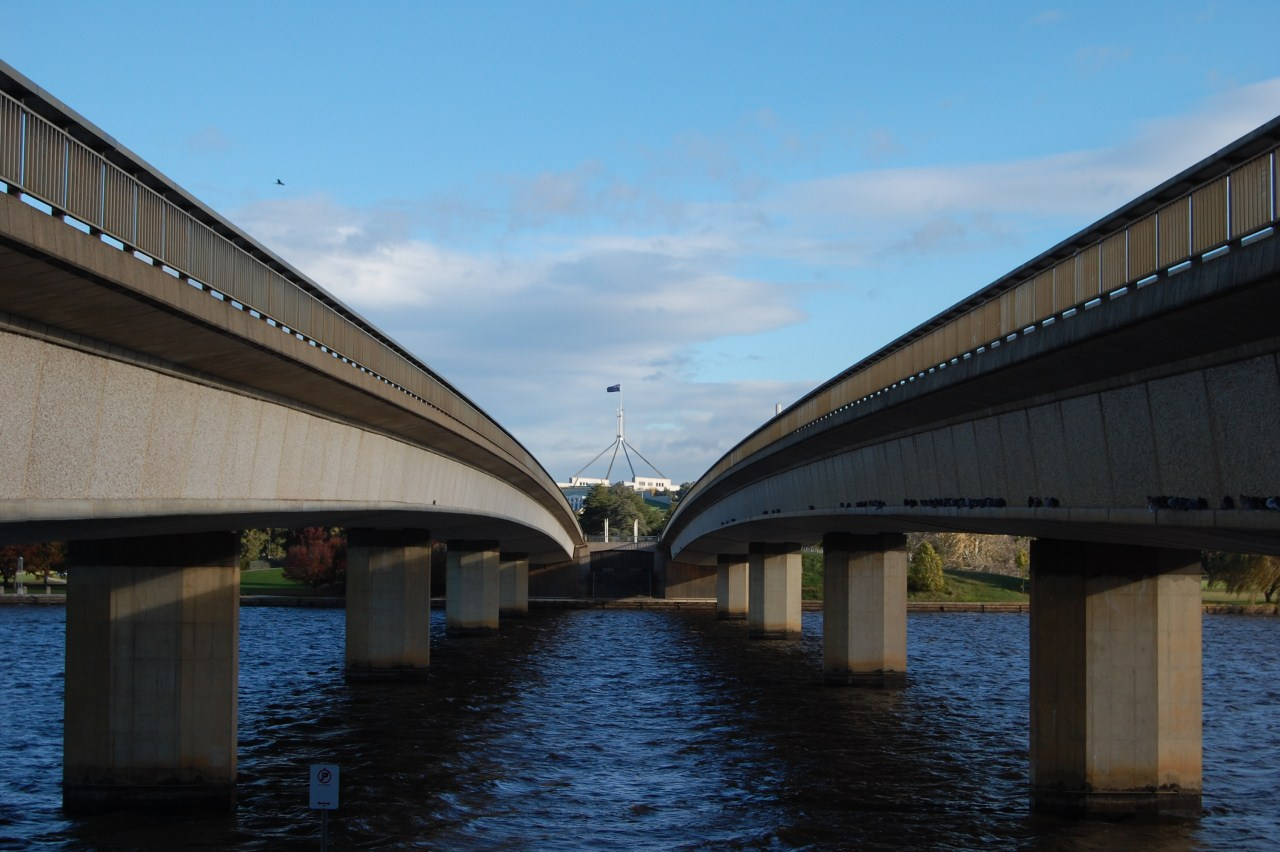
- Commonwealth Avenue Bridge over Lake Burley Griffin, with Parliament House, Canberra in the background
- Coordinates: 35°17′30″S 149°07′37″E
- Carries: Commonwealth Avenue
- Crosses: Lake Burley Griffin
- Locale: Canberra, Australian Capital Territory
- Begins: Parkes (south end)
- Ends: City (north end)
- Other name(s): Commonwealth Bridge
- Owner: National Capital Authority
- Preceded by: Kings Avenue Bridge
- Followed by: Scrivener Dam

Characteristics
- Material: Concrete
- Trough construction: Steel
- Total length: 310 metres (1,017 ft)
- Longest span: 73 metres (240 ft)
- No. of spans: 5
- Piers in water: 4
- No. of lanes: 6 traffic (3 north / 3 southbound); Shared footway / bicycle path

History
- Designer: Maunsell & Partners
- Constructed by: Hornibrook
- Construction start: March 1961
- Opened: November 1963

The Commonwealth Avenue Bridge is two parallel box girder road bridges, made of pre-stressed concrete, that carry Commonwealth Avenue across Lake Burley Griffin, and connect Parkes and City in Canberra, Australia.

== History ==
The current bridge is the fourth crossing over the Molonglo River. The first Commonwealth Avenue Bridge, completed 1916, was damaged in the 1922 flood. The second, using three Leychester-type trusses, was completed in 1924 and damaged in floods a year later. The third bridge, completed in 1927, was a modification of the 1924 bridge, by raising the bridge by one metre (three feet) and adding a fourth truss. At that time, Molonglo River was not dammed to form Lake Burley Griffin. Building on the plan developed by Walter Burley Griffin, in 1957 William Holford proposed to the federal government that the Molonglo be dammed near Yarralumla and that Canberra's 'two halves' should be joined via a lake.

Construction of the Commonwealth Avenue Bridge began in March 1961 and the bridge was opened in November 1963. Concurrently, the Kings Avenue Bridge was opened in March 1962; and Scrivener Dam was completed in September 1963. Both bridges were built over a dry riverbed as Canberra was in the grip of drought. It took some time for the lake to fill; finally filled for the first time on 29 April 1964.

== Description ==
Designed by Maunsell & Partners and built by Hornibrook, the Commonwealth Avenue Bridge comprises five spans of continually pre-stressed concrete, totalling 310 metres (1,020 ft). The provide an entry and exit clover leaf layout, on the bridges southern approaches, operate structures were constructed totalling 49 metres (161 ft) each, in four approximately equal spans. The main superstructure is of multi-web box section shape, continuous over the five spans, ranging from 56 to 73 metres (185 to 240 ft). The central piers, octagonal in shape, are carried on 2-metre (6 ft) diameter reinforced concrete cylinders. Each of the pre-cast concrete box girder sections are 3 metres (10 ft) each.

The bridge abutments incorporate two large stones from the now-demolished 1817 iteration of Waterloo Bridge, London, which were gifted by the British government.

In 2019 a detailed analysis for the strengthening and widening of Commonwealth Avenue Bridge was presented in a business case for the project. In late 2020 the project was evaluated and accepted by Infrastructure Australia and in January 2021, the Federal Government announced funding to renew the Bridge.

The ACT Government also proposes to extend the Canberra light rail network from Civic to Woden via the bridge.
