= Canberra Vikings =

Australian rugby union team

(Australia) Canberra Vikings
- Vikings logo adopted in season 1999
- Founded: 1994 (as Canberra Kookaburras) re-formed as Vikings 1998
- Disbanded: 2020 (competition disbanded)
- Location: Canberra, Australia
- Region: Australian Capital Territory and Southern New South Wales
- Ground: Viking Park (Capacity: 10,000)
- Captain: Darcy Swain
- League: National Rugby Championship
- 2019: Runner-up; 2nd placed (regular season)
Team kit

Official website
- vikingsrugby.com.au

The Canberra Vikings, formerly the Canberra Kookaburras, was an Australian rugby union football team that competed in the National Rugby Championship (NRC) until 2019. The team was based at Viking Park in Wanniassa, and is backed by the Tuggeranong Vikings Group as the licence holder, with the Brumbies and University of Canberra as non-financial partners.

The coaching and training programs used by the Brumbies for Super Rugby are extended to players joining the NRC team from the Brumbies, the local ACTRU Premier Division club competition, and the ACT and Southern NSW Rugby Union catchment area.

The present NRC team is descended from the ACT representative side known as the Canberra Kookaburras. That name was adopted by the Canberra Kookaburra Rugby Club for the ACT Rugby Union's entry into the NSW Premiership in 1995. Ownership of the Kookaburras was transferred to the Tuggeranong Vikings RUC for the 1999 season and the team was renamed the Canberra Vikings.

The Vikings played in the QRU Premiership (2001 to 2003, winning three titles), Tooheys New Cup (2004 and 2005) and Australian Rugby Shield (winning in 2006), before entering the Australian Rugby Championship (2007). That competition did not continue after the inaugural season and the Canberra Vikings team was disbanded at the end of 2007. After a six-year absence, the team was revived as the University of Canberra Vikings for the national competition relaunch as the NRC in 2014.

== History ==
The late 19th century was when rugby began to be played in the region around what is now Canberra. Goulburn Rugby Union Club became a founding member of the Southern Rugby Union in 1874, and Queanbeyan played Yass in 1878. Teams from Hall and the Royal Military College, Duntroon played rugby union matches prior to the First World War. The Federal Capital Territory Rugby Union was established and re-established several times in the 1920s and 30s, before the First Grade competition was finally started in 1938 with four clubs playing in the inaugural season.

=== ACT representative team ===
The Territory's representative team hosted the All Blacks at Manuka Oval in the winter of 1938. The Canberra side managed to score a try before the interval and trailed the visitors at half time by 24–5 before the New Zealanders went on to win by 57–5. Coached by Frank O'Rourke, the home team had played its inaugural match only three months earlier.

The team's original strip featured an all gold jersey with two green bands. They defeated the Hawkesbury College at the Country Carnival earlier in 1938, and later that season won against the Bathurst side. Three players from the Territory team were selected for NSW Combined Country to play Sydney that year. The Australian Capital Territory team, often referred to simply as "Canberra", grew in stature in the decades following the Second World War. ACT won the Caldwell Cup for the Country Championship for the first time in 1964 and retained it for the following two seasons.

1990s Kookaburras rep team kit and logo.

Rugby in Canberra came of age in the 1970s. ACT scored a 17–11 away win over Queensland in 1972, and then had their first win over a national side, defeating Tonga by 17–6 in 1973. In 1975, ACT won promotion for the following season to the top division of the Wallaby Trophy, Australia's provincial championship at that time. The triumph was short-lived, however, because the planned tournament for 1976 was officially cancelled.

When Wales toured Australia in 1978, the ACT defeated them in a rousing 21–20 come-from-behind victory. The win over the reigning Five Nations champions showed that ACT could compete against the top tier of rugby players in the world.

The name "Canberra Kookaburras" was used for the ACT representative team from 1989, but it was to be a further five years before the Canberra Kookaburra club was officially founded. When the ACT comprehensively beat New South Wales by 44–28 in 1994, an invitation was issued for a Canberra club to play in the expanded 14-team NSWRU Premiership sponsored by AAMI for the following season.

=== Canberra Kookaburras: AAMI Cup ===

1995 Kookaburras AAMI Cup kit and logo.

The ACT Rugby Union formed the Canberra Kookaburra Rugby Club in August 1994, with Tuggeranong Vikings RUC as underwriter. For the 1995 AAMI Cup, the Canberra Kookaburras played their home games at Manuka Oval and had to travel to Sydney on most other weekends. The club fielded teams in first grade, reserve grade and colts. The Canberra Kookaburras played in a white and black strip, separated by bands of blue and gold (ACT's traditional colours) around the centre of the jersey. White and black were the colours of the first Canberra team formed in 1927.

Canberra's reserve grade team won their grand final in the first season. The first grade team, coached by Geoff Stokes, also made the grand final in their first season but lost to Gordon by 24–11 to finish as runner-up in 1995. The advent of the ACT Brumbies and Super 12 in 1996 affected the Kookaburras' playing strength, with only one man from the previous grand final team available for the start of the 1996 season. Canberra were placed fifth in the regular season that year, and lost to Randwick in the elimination final.

The Kookaburras were coached by Kim Thurbon in 1997, and by Ian Snook in 1998. The first grade team did not make the finals in either year. Travelling had caused a heavy financial drain on the club by 1998. Ownership of the Canberra Kookaburras was transferred to Tuggerannong Vikings RUC in 1998 and the team's name was changed to Canberra Vikings for the 1999 season.

=== Canberra Vikings ===
Canberra Vikings team kit in 2000.

The Canberra Vikings adopted the red and white colours of Tuggeranong Vikings RUC with black detailing on the jersey and black shorts.

==== NSW Premiership ====
Ian Snook was retained as the team's first grade coach after the club's changeover of colours and name to the Canberra Vikings. The NSW Premiership was sponsored as the Citibank MasterCard Cup in 1999, and Canberra just missed out on making the finals. Despite the Vikings playing in the semi-finals in 2000, both Canberra and Newcastle were dropped from the competition for the 2001 season. The Vikings then made arrangements to play in Queensland.

==== Queensland Premiership ====
The Canberra Vikings played in the QRU's Premiership from 2001 to 2003 and won the grand final each year to take three consecutive titles. Canberra's entry increased the number of clubs from nine to ten and brought an added professionalism to the competition that was sponsored as the XXXX Premiership in 2001. With Terry Burkett as coach, the Vikings finished second in the 18-round regular season behind GPS Old Boys, but comfortably beat the Gold Coast Breakers by 32–10 in the grand final to win the Hospitals Cup.

The Queensland Premier Rugby competition was introduced in 2002, using additional funding from an ARU program to strengthen the top tier of Australian clubs in a transition to semi-pro rugby. Played in the second half of the season to allow Super 12 players to compete, the Premier Rugby competition spanned nine rounds followed by a finals series for the Hospitals Cup. For the first half of the season the clubs played for the Welsby Cup, which was won by Sunnybank in 2002.

Laurie Fisher stepped up from the assistant coaching role the previous season to become the Vikings' head coach and his team took out the double in the 2002 Premier Rugby competition. The Vikings won the minor premiership with an 8–1 season before defeating Easts Tigers in the grand final, avenging a regular round loss to the Tigers with a 45–3 win. Fisher was the head coach again in 2003 when Canberra finished second behind University of Queensland in the minor premiership, but his team went on to beat the Gold Coast Breakers in the grand final by 29–16 to win their third title in a row.

==== NSW Premiership: Tooheys New Cup ====
After nine seasons of Canberra teams playing in interstate competitions, the Vikings' relations with the premier clubs in Sydney and Brisbane had become strained. This was reportedly due to a view that the Vikings were being given the opportunity every week of poaching talented young players and that the team was being run as a shadow ACT Brumbies development side. Nevertheless, possibly due to the ARU's intervention, Canberra was granted approval to play in Sydney or Brisbane for 2004. The Vikings took the option closer to home and went to Sydney for their tenth season on the road.

Nick Scrivener was the coach of the Canberra Vikings in the Tooheys New Cup for 2004. He led the team to a qualifying final after they had finished fourth in the regular season and won seven matches from twelve. The Vikings lost to Sydney University in the qualifier by 44–14. In 2005, the team was coached by John Ross. He also guided the side to seven wins from twelve matches in the regular season, but the Vikings finished sixth that year and did not play in the finals. Canberra was kicked out of the NSW Premiership for a second time ahead of the 2006 season, ostensibly to streamline the Sydney competition and allow the NSWRU to make more room in their calendar for the proposed Australian Provincial Championship.

==== Australian Rugby Shield ====
The Vikings entered the Australian Rugby Shield in 2006, playing as the "ACT & Southern NSW Vikings" following the renaming of the ACT Rugby Union after its expansion into Southern New South Wales the previous season. The team had two close matches against NSW Country and Perth Gold during the season, but managed to progress undefeated through the three pool games, semi-final and final to win the competition and take the shield. The Vikings played the Melbourne Axemen in the grand final at Viking Park and never looked back after the third minute when inside centre Josh Staniforth scored the first of the side's five tries for the match in a 36–10 win.

==== Australian Rugby Championship ====
The Canberra Vikings played in the Australian Rugby Championship, known as the ARC, in 2007. Nick Scrivener returned as coach. The Vikings failed to progress beyond the robin-round stages after just three wins from eight matches; 17–8 against Perth Spirit, 53–8 over the Ballymore Tornadoes and a 29–6 win away against Sydney Fleet. The ARC was terminated at the end of 2007 after only one season of competition, with the Australian Rugby Union citing higher costs than budgeted and further projected financial losses. The Canberra Vikings team was disbanded with the end of the ARC competition.

==== National Rugby Championship ====
UC Vikings logo used from 2014 to 2016

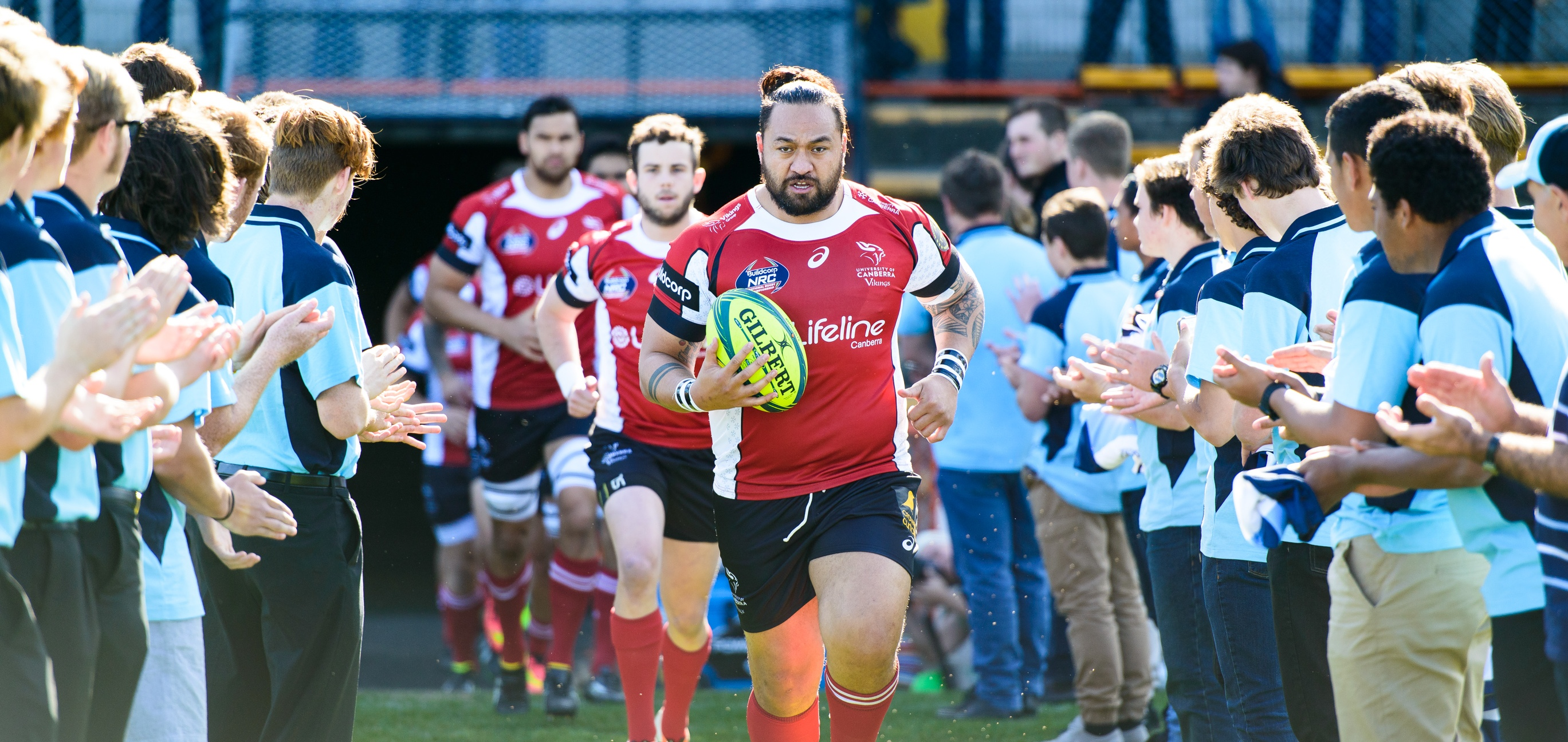
The Vikings led by Fotu Auelua in 2014

In late 2013, the ARU announced the national competition would be relaunched as the National Rugby Championship in 2014. The expressions of interest were open to all parties and tenders were finalised in early 2014. A three-way partnership between the Brumbies, Tuggeranong Vikings and University of Canberra was granted a licence for a revived Canberra Vikings team, named as the University of Canberra Vikings.

Dan McKellar was appointed as head coach for 2014, and the University of Canberra Vikings (UC Vikings) played their home matches at Viking Park. The team finished sixth in the regular season and did not compete in the finals.

Prior to the 2016 NRC season, the Brumbies chief executive, Michael Jones, had suggested that the "Canberra Kookaburras" name might be reinstated. Reverting to the ACT's traditional blue and gold colours was also canvassed, but it was likely that a voting process would be used for any change. A decision was postponed due to financial considerations until 2017, when the plan was revoked after the Vikings Group took sole ownership of the team licence. However, the team adopted a heritage-style blue, gold, black and white jersey for their first game of the season in 2017, coinciding with a Kookaburras team reunion as part of the NRC's heritage round.

| 2014–15 | 2017 | Heritage | 2018–19 |

== Stadium ==
The Vikings currently play at Viking Park. Many rugby union matches have been played at the stadium including two women's tests for Australia against New Zealand.

In the 2007 Australian Rugby Championship, the Canberra Vikings played at two locations; Manuka Oval and Canberra Stadium. Manuka Oval was constructed in 1929 and hosts the annual Prime Minister's XI cricket match, as well as senior club AFL and cricket. Originally Manuka Oval was not just a cricket ground, but was also used for international rugby matches, mainly between a Canberra team and the touring international side. Canberra Stadium (originally Bruce Stadium) was constructed in 1977 and is the home of the ACT Brumbies and Canberra Raiders.

== Current squad ==
The squad for the 2019 NRC season:

Canberra Vikings squad – NRC 2019
| Prop: (Australia) Bo Abra; (Australia) Max Bode (Note: Bode (Rd 5).); (Australia) Nick Dobson; (Australia) Fred Kaihea; (Australia) Tom Ross; (Australia) Jake Simeon; (Australia) Angus Wagner; Hooker: (Australia) Lachlan Lonergan; (Australia) TP Luteru; (Australia) Connal McInerney; (Australia) Alex Small (Note: Small and Sankey (semi-final), and Lincoln Smith (final).); Lock: (Australia) **Blake Enever**; (Australia) Nick Frost; (Australia) Will Sankey; (Australia) Darcy Swain (c); Backrow: (Australia) Angus Allen; (Australia) Luke Gersekowski; (Australia) Jake Helgesen; (Australia) Will Miller; (Australia) **Pete Samu**^{1}; (Australia) Levi Shaw; (Australia) **Rob Valetini** | Scrum-half: (Australia) Ryan Lonergan; (Australia) **Joe Powell**^{1}; (Australia) Seamus Smith; Fly-half: (Australia) Bayley Kuenzle; (Australia) Noah Lolesio; Centre: (Australia) Len Ikitau; (New Zealand) Irae Simone; (Australia) Tom Wright; Wing: (Australia) George Morseu; (Australia) Andy Muirhead; (Niue) Toni Pulu; (Australia) Andrew Robinson; (Australia) Lincoln Smith; Fullback: (Australia) **Tom Banks**^{1}; (Australia) Mack Hansen; **Bold** denotes player is internationally capped; (c) denotes team captain; ^{1} denotes marquee player |
Notes: The initial squad was named in late August. Players joining in subsequent rounds were:

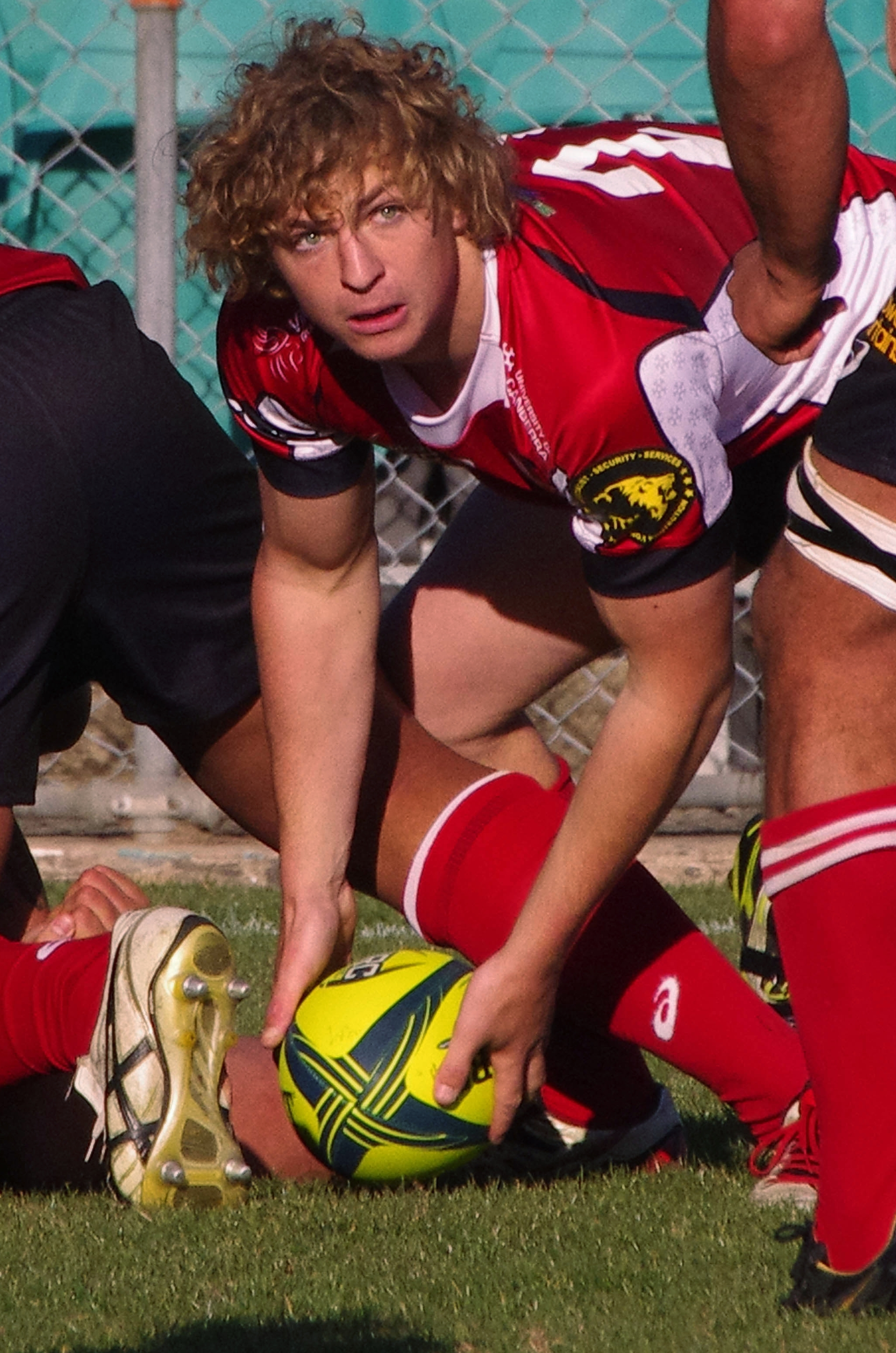
Scrum-half Joe Powell.

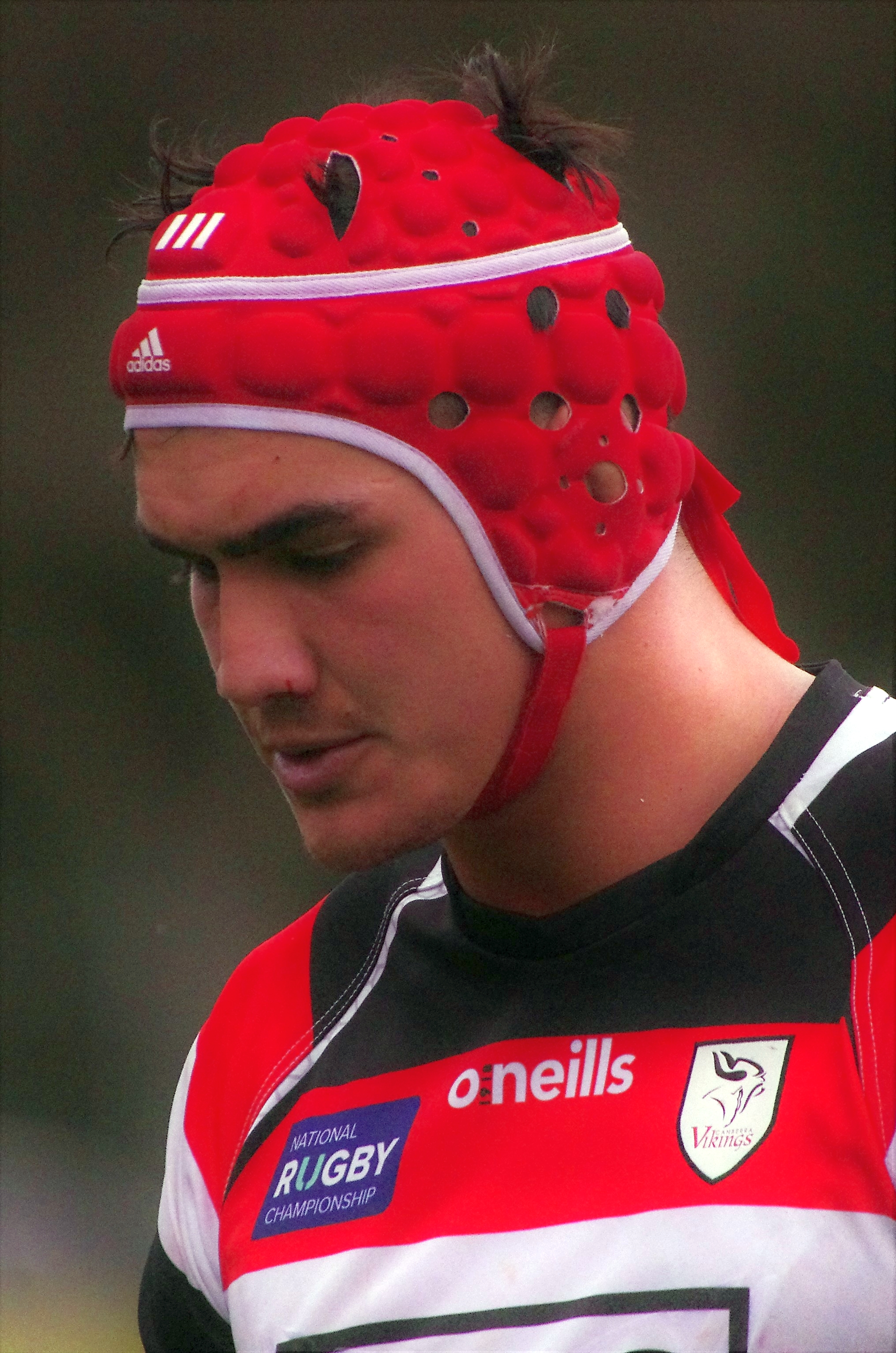
Darcy Swain in 2018.

== Records ==
=== Honours ===
- **National Rugby Championship**
  - Runner-up: 2015, 2017
  - Playoff appearance: 2018
- **Australian Rugby Shield**
  - Winner: 2006
- **Queensland Premiership**
  - Winner: 2001, 2002, 2003
- **New South Wales Premiership**
  - Runner-up: 1995 (as Canberra Kookaburras)

=== Season standings ===
National Rugby Championship

| Year | Pos | Pld | W | D | L | F | A | +/- | BP | Pts | Play-offs |
|---|---|---|---|---|---|---|---|---|---|---|---|
| 2018 | **4th** | 7 | 5 | 0 | 2 | 221 | 169 | +52 | 2 | **22** | Semi-final loss to Fijian Drua by 35–28 |
| 2017 | **1st** | 8 | 6 | 0 | 2 | 353 | 186 | +167 | 5 | **29** | Grand final loss to Queensland Country by 42–28 |
| 2016 | **5th** | 7 | 3 | 0 | 4 | 254 | 276 | −22 | 3 | **15** | Did not compete |
| 2015 | **2nd** | 8 | 7 | 0 | 1 | 375 | 176 | +199 | 7 | **35** | Grand final loss to Brisbane City by 21–10 |
| 2014 | **6th** | 8 | 2 | 2 | 4 | 210 | 238 | −28 | 2 | **14** | Did not compete |

Australian Rugby Championship

| Year | Pos | Pld | W | D | L | F | A | +/- | BP | Pts | Play-offs |
|---|---|---|---|---|---|---|---|---|---|---|---|
| 2007 | **6th** | 8 | 3 | 0 | 5 | 217 | 191 | +26 | 7 | **19** | Did not compete |

=== Head coaches ===
- Ryan Schultz (2024-present)
- Nick Scrivener (2018–2023)
- Tim Sampson (2017)
- Wayne Southwell (2016)
- Brad Harris (2015)
- Dan McKellar (2014)
- Nick Scrivener (2007)
- Tom Morrison (2006)
- John Ross (2005)
- Nick Scrivener (2004)
- Laurie Fisher (2002–2003)
- Terry Burkett (2001)
- Ian Snook (1998–2000)
- Kim Thurbon (1997)
- Geoff Stokes (1995–1996)

=== Captains ===
- Darcy Swain 2019
- Ben Hyne 2018
- Tom Cusack 2017
- Jarrad Butler (2015–2016)
- Fotu Auelua (2014)
- Alister Campbell (2007)

=== Squads ===
2016 University of Canberra Vikings – NRC
The squad for the 2016 National Rugby Championship season:
| **Props**: **Allan Alaalatoa**; Nick Dobson; Ray Dobson; Leslie Leulua’iali’i-Makin; **Scott Sio**^{1}; Fa'alelei Sione; Sione Taula; **Hookers**: Robbie Abel; **Joshua Mann-Rea**; Connal McInerney; **Locks**: **Rory Arnold**^{1}; **Sam Carter**; Blake Enever; Tom Staniforth; Darcy Swain | **Loose forwards**: Jarrad Butler (c); OJ Noa; Dean Oakman-Hunt; Dan Penca; Jordan Smiler; **Scrum-halves**: Brent Hamlin; Joe Powell; **Fly-halves**: Jordan Jackson-Hope; Nick Jooste | **Centres**: **Tevita Kuridrani**^{1}; Jake Rakic; Andrew Robinson; Andrew Smith; **Wingers**: James Dargaville; Jamie Kotz; Eli Sinoti; **Henry Speight**^{1}; Lausii Taliauli; Edan Campbell-O'Brien; **Fullbacks**: Robbie Coleman; Isaac Thompson; Notes: (c) Team captain **Bold** denotes international capped players at that time^{1} National player additional to contracted squad |

2015 University of Canberra Vikings – NRC
The squad for the 2015 National Rugby Championship season:
| **Props**: Allan Alaalatoa; **Ben Alexander**; Phil Kite; Tyrel Lomax; Leslie Leulua’iali’i-Makin; Sione Taula; **Hookers**: Albert Anae; Robbie Abel; Connal McInerney; **Locks**: Rory Arnold; Blake Enever; Gareth Clouston; Dave McKern | **Loose forwards**: Jarrad Butler (c); Dean Oakman-Hunt; Dan Penca; Rowan Perry; Jordan Smiler; Ita Vaea; **Scrum-halves**: Joe Powell; Brent Hamlin; **Fly-halves**: Rodney Iona; **Christian Lealiifano**^{1}; Mitch Third | **Centres**: Nigel Ah Wong; James Dargaville; Francis Fainifo; Jake Rakic; **Wingers**: Jake Knight; Jerome Nuimata; **Henry Speight**^{1}; Peni Tagive; Lausii Taliauli; **Joe Tomane**^{1}; **Fullbacks**: Isaac Thompson; Aidan Toua; Notes: (c) Team captain **Bold** denotes international capped players at that time^{1} National player additional to contracted squad |

2014 University of Canberra Vikings – NRC
The squad for the 2014 National Rugby Championship season:
| **Props**: Allan Alaalatoa; Leslie Leulua’iali’i-Makin; **Scott Sio**^{1}; JP Smith; Ruan Smith; Sione Taula; **Hookers**: Seilala Lam; Siliva Siliva; Mitch Wade; **Locks**: **Sam Carter**^{1}; Gareth Clouston; Dave McKern; Tom Staniforth | **Loose forwards**: Fotu Auelua (c); Jarrad Butler; Tim Cree; Sean Doyle; Rowan Perry; Jordan Smiler; **Scrum-halves**: Michael Dowsett; Joe Powell; **Fly-halves**: Rodney Iona; Isaac Thompson | **Centres**: Nigel Ah Wong; Matt Hawke; Jake Rakic; **Christian Lealiifano**^{1}; **Pat McCabe**^{1}; **Wingers**: **Henry Speight**; **Joe Tomane**; Jerome Nuimata; Drew Southwell; Liam Slater; **Fullbacks**: Robbie Coleman; **Jesse Mogg**; Brendon Taueki; Notes: (c) Team captain **Bold** denotes international capped players at that time^{1} National player additional to contracted squad |

2007 Canberra Vikings – ARC
| **Props**: **Nic Henderson**; Jack Kennedy; Pauliasi Tomoepeau; John Ulugia; **Hookers**: Saia Fainga'a; Anthony Hegarty; Dan Raymond; **Locks**: **Alister Campbell** (c); Peter Kimlin; Leon Power; Adam Wallace-Harrison | **Back row**: Jarred Barry; **Mark Chisholm**; Dan Guinness; Julian Salvi; Jone Tawake; Henry Vanderglas; **Halfbacks**: Beau Mokotupu; Nick Haydon; Patrick Phibbs; **Flyhalves**: Christian Lealiifano | **Centres**: Tim Cornforth; Matthew Carraro; Anthony Fainga'a; Gene Fairbanks; Rowan Kellam; **Wings**: Francis Fainifo; Solomona Fainifo; Eddie Mclaughlin; **Fullbacks**: Tim Wright; Notes: (c) Team captain **Bold** denotes international capped players at that time |

== Gallery ==
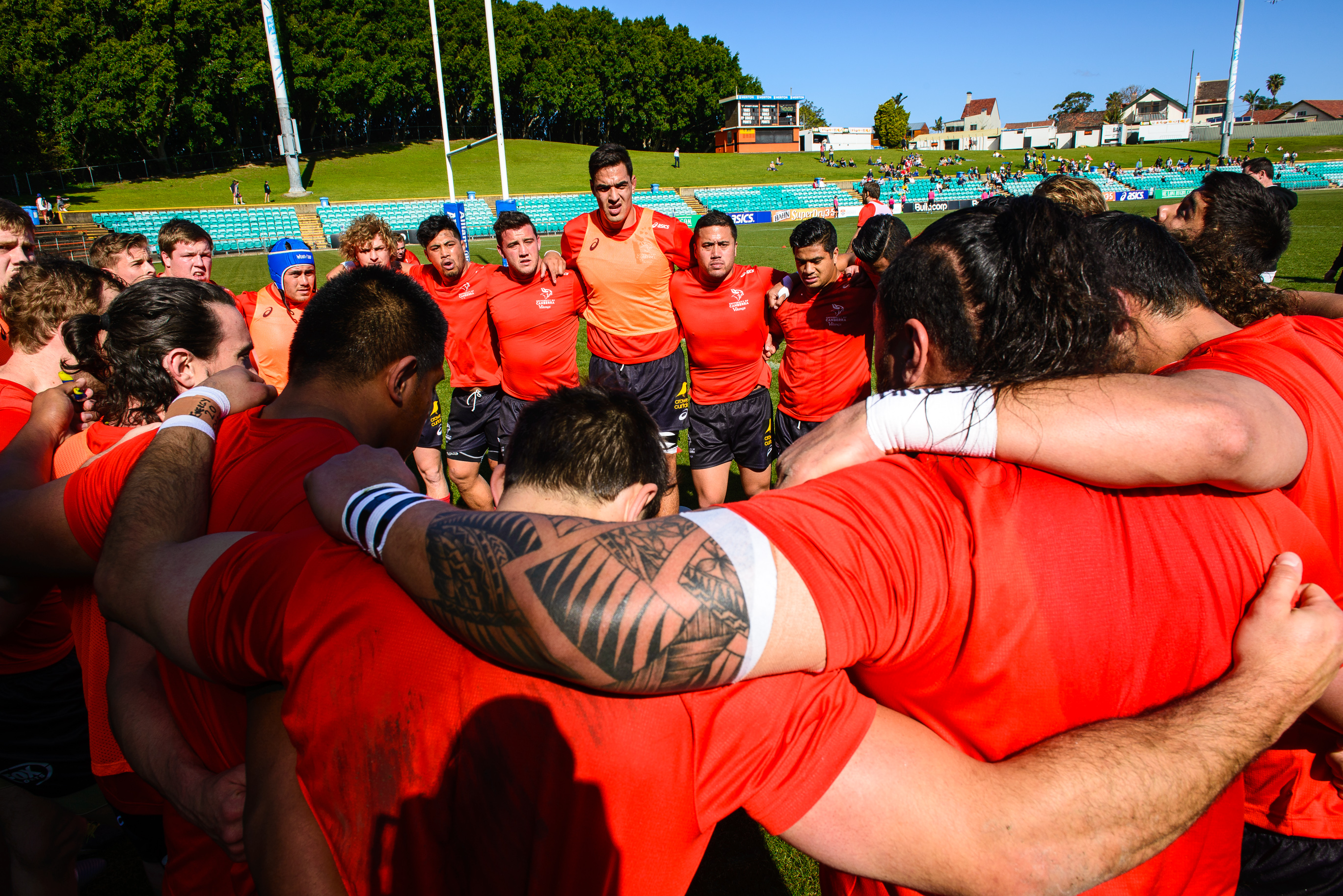
Canberra Vikings pre-game

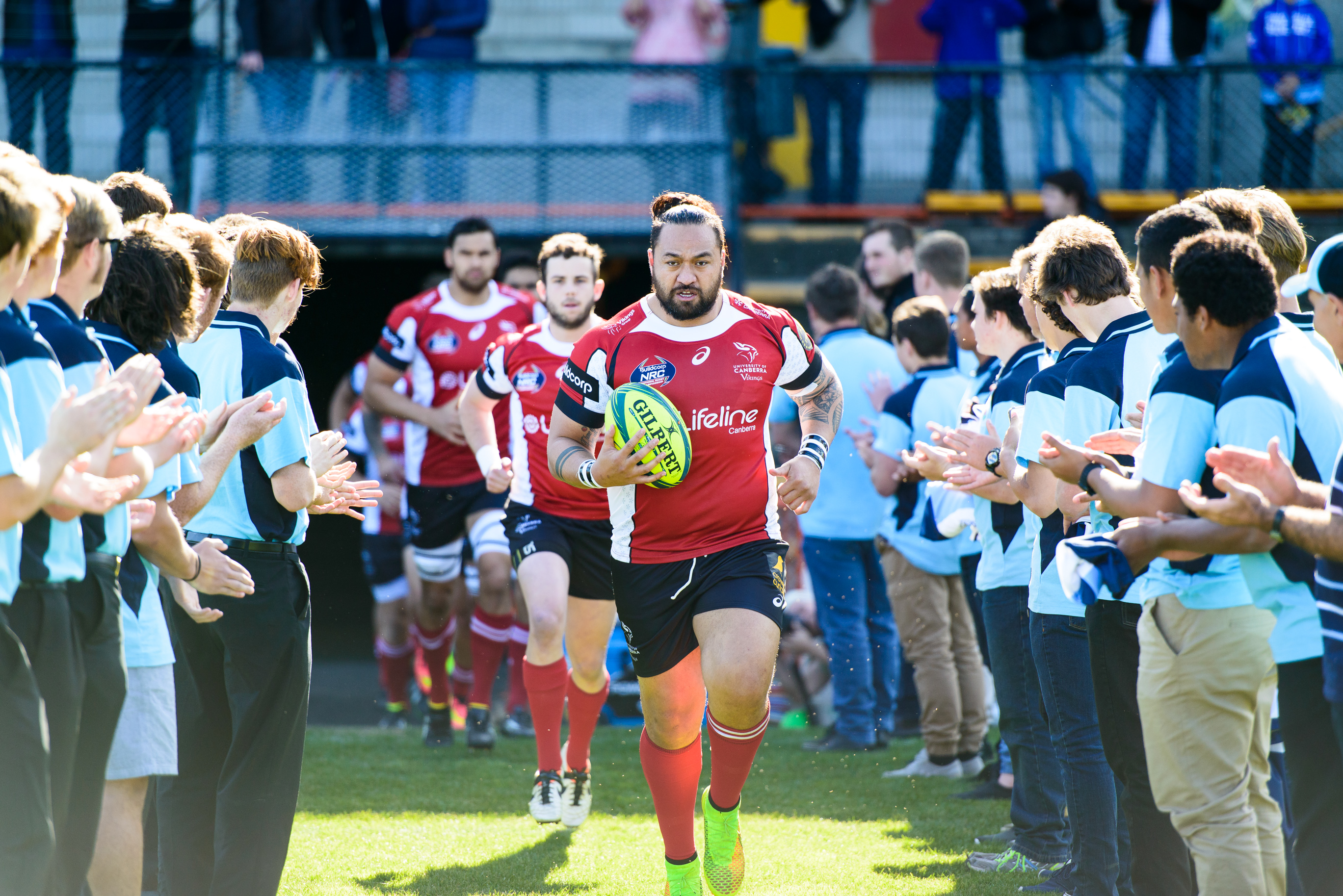
Canberra Vikings charge out

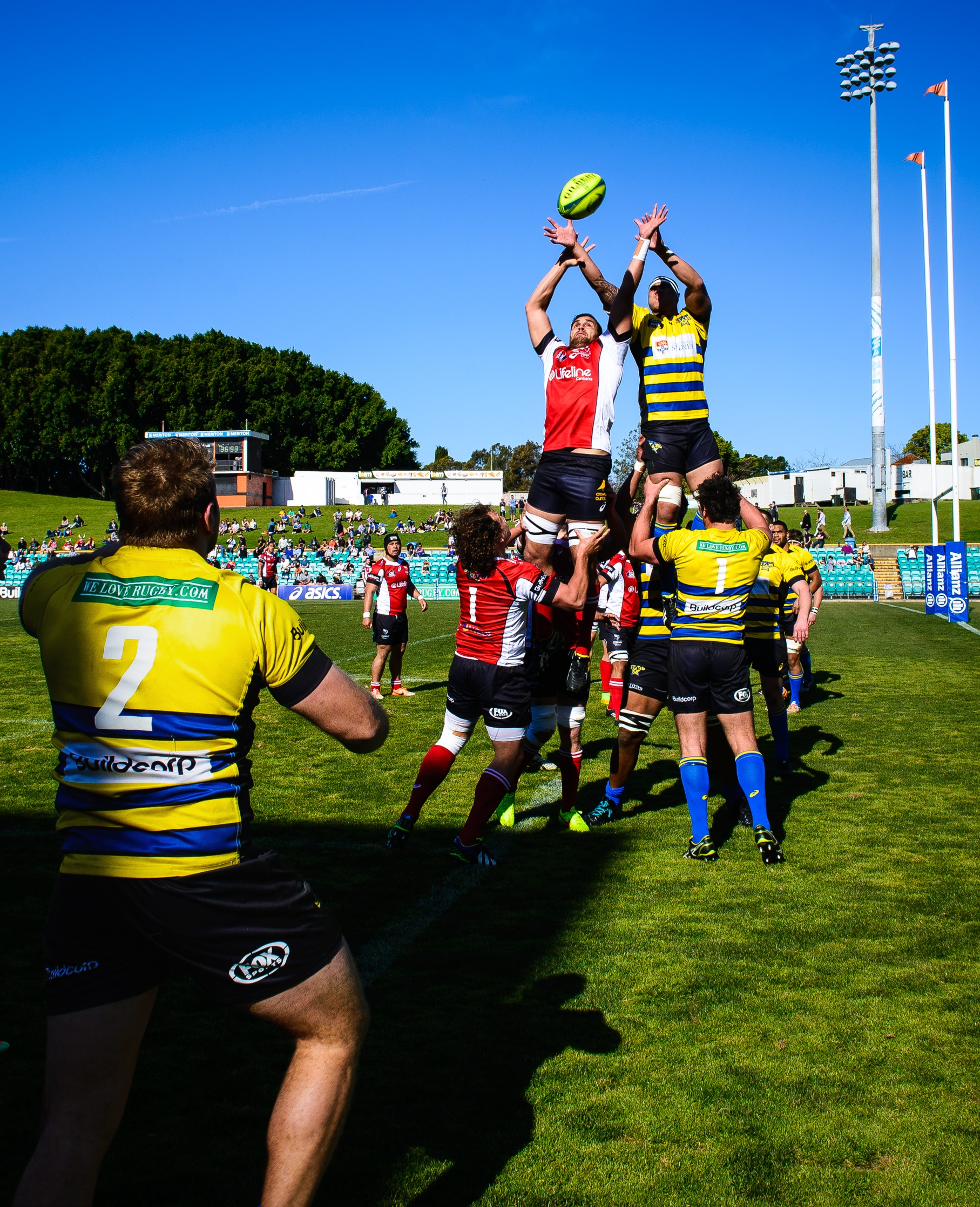
Canberra Vikings fight for possession

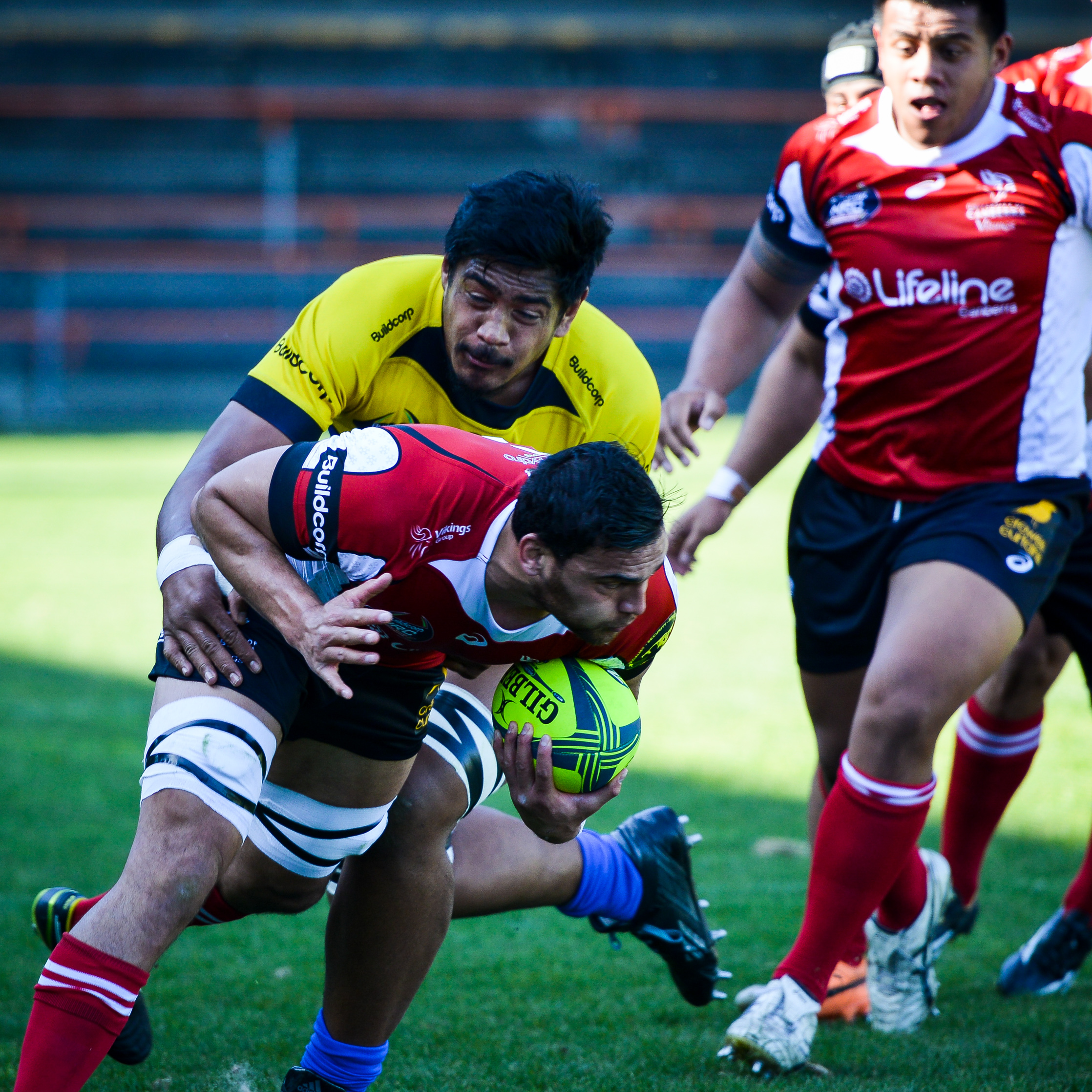
Canberra Vikings under pressure

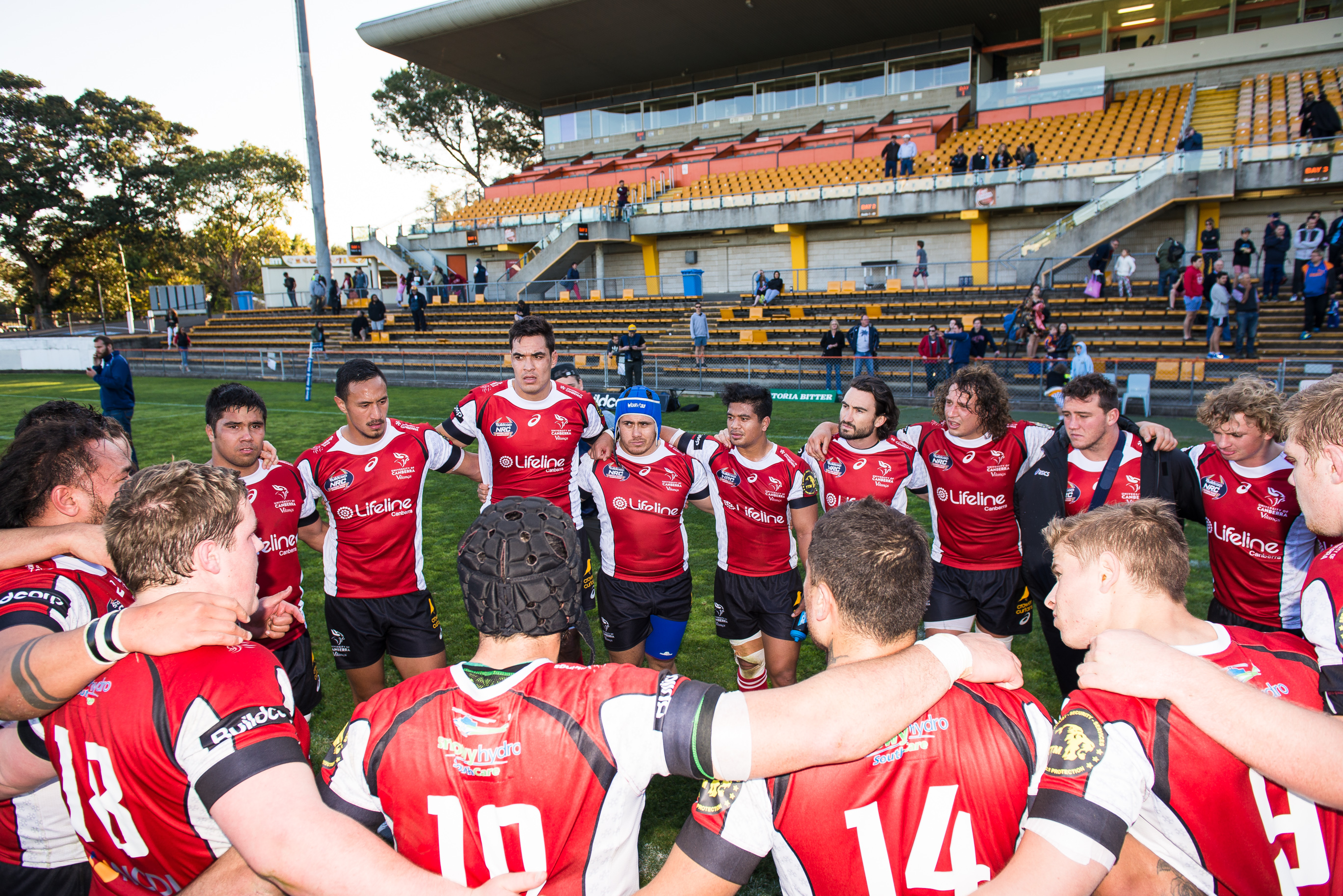
Canberra Vikings post game huddle

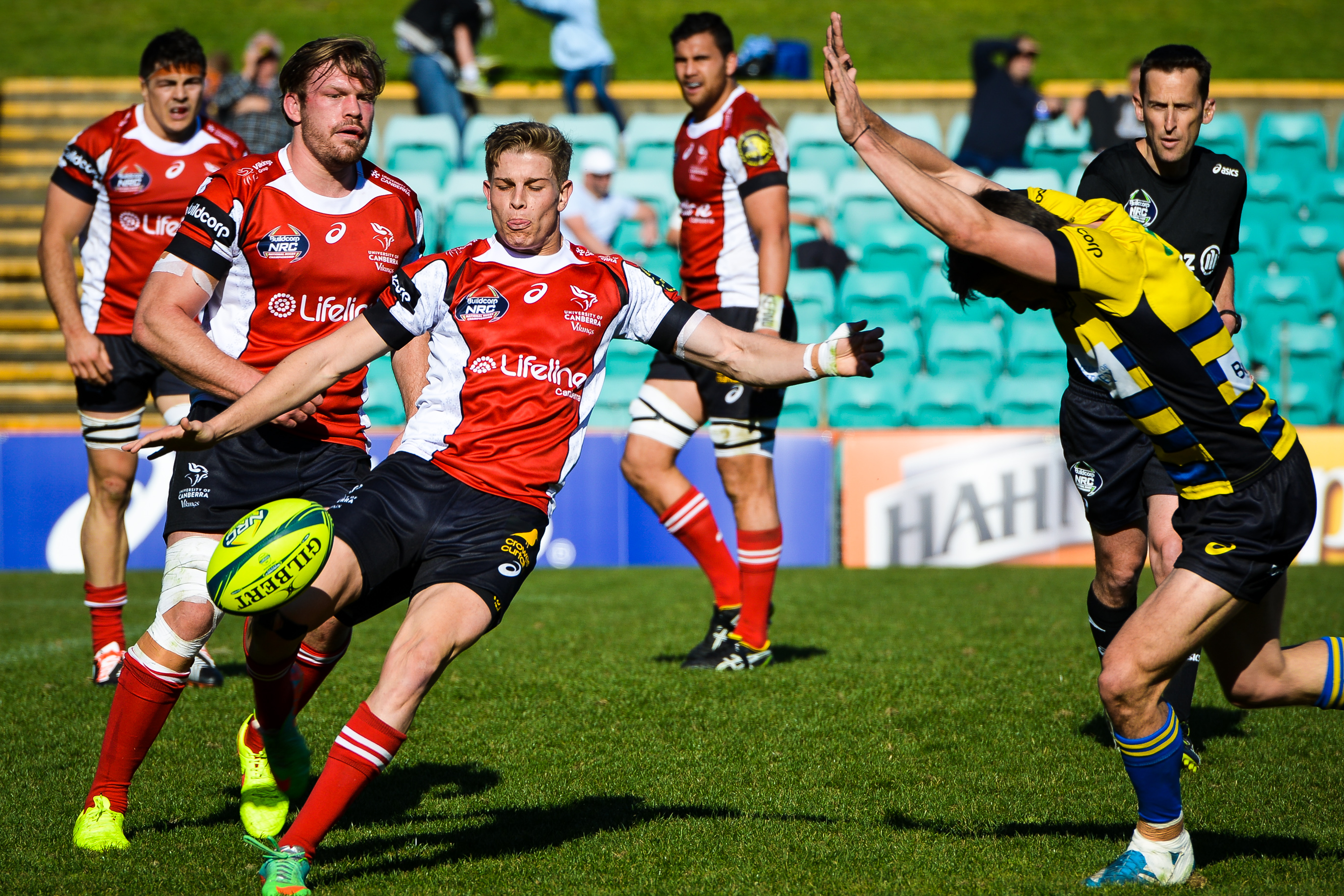
Canberra Vikings clear the ball

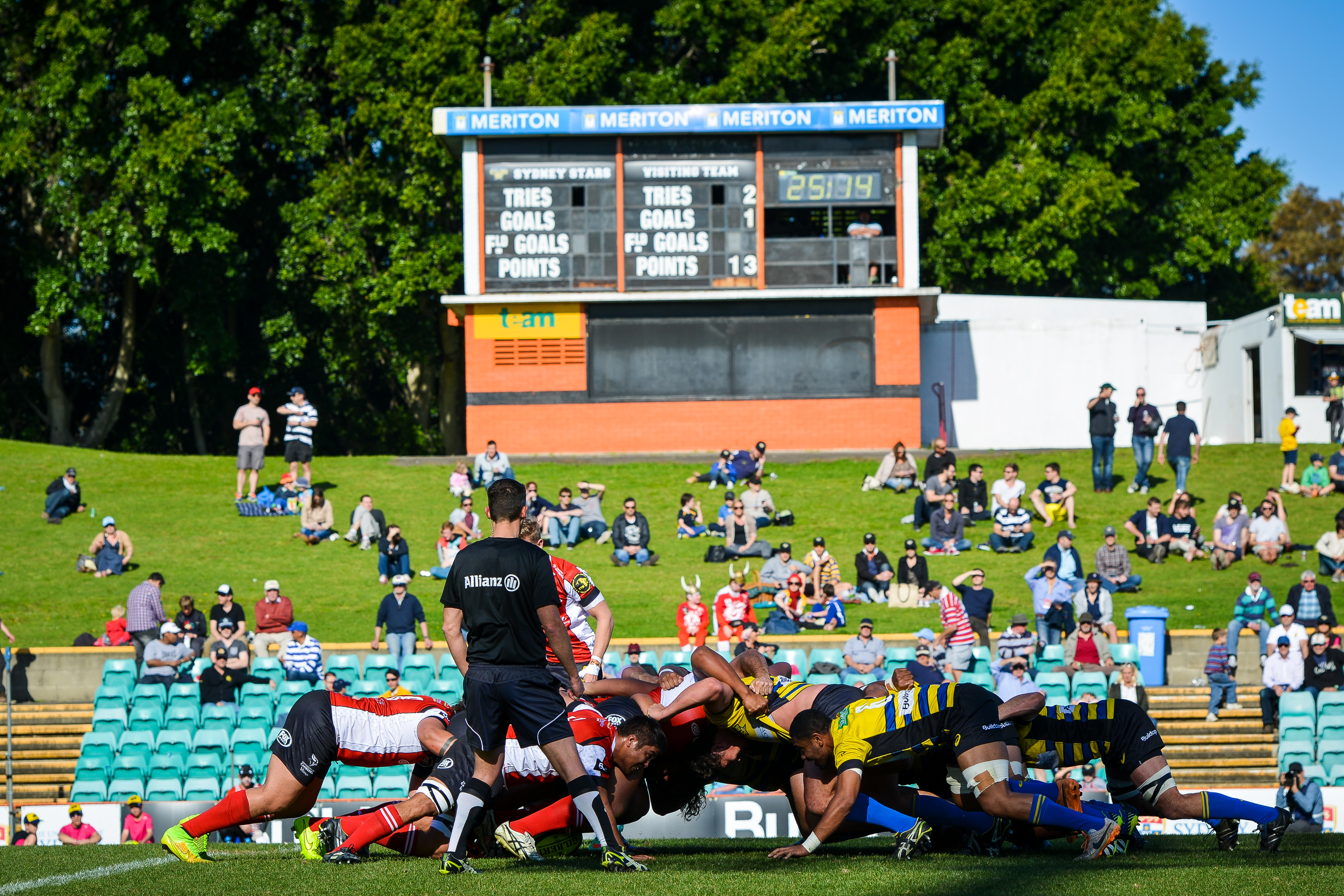
Canberra Vikings scrum down under the Scoreboard

== See also ==
- Brumbies Rugby
- ACT and Southern NSW Rugby Union
- Rugby union in the Australian Capital Territory
- Canberra Raiders

== Sources ==
- "Annual Report 2001" (PDF 4.1 MB). Queensland Rugby. Archived (PDF) from the original on 24 February 2014.
- "Annual Report 2002" (PDF 3.5 MB). Queensland Rugby. Archived (PDF) from the original on 24 February 2014.
- "Annual Report 2003" (PDF 5.6 MB). Queensland Rugby. Archived (PDF) from the original on 4 April 2015.
- "Annual Report 2014". Australian Rugby.
