= Peni Tagive =

Australian rugby footballer (born 1988)

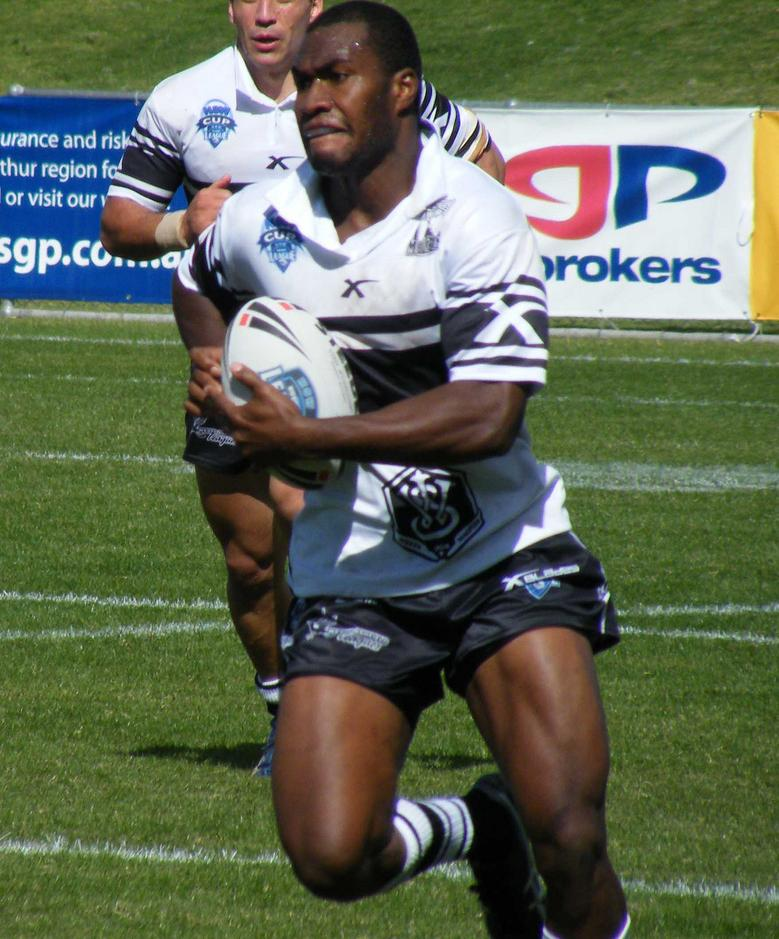
- Tagive with the Newton Jets

Personal information
- Full name: Ratu Peni Tagive
- Born: 3 October 1988 (age 38) Campbelltown, New South Wales, Australia
- Height: 192 cm (6 ft 4 in)
- Weight: 99 kg (15 st 8 lb)

Playing information

Rugby league
- Position: Wing
Club
Years	Team	Pld	T	G	FG	P
2008–09	Wests Tigers	8	3	0	0	12
2010–11	St. George Illawarra	5	3	0	0	12
2012	Sydney Roosters	5	0	0	0	0
	Total	18	6	0	0	24

Rugby union
Club
Years	Team	Pld	T	G	FG	P
2015	Wests Rugby
2015	Canberra Vikings
2019	Austin Elite
	Total	0	0	0	0	0
- Relatives: Ratu Tagive (brother)

Ratu Peni Tagive (born 3 October 1988) is an Australian former professional rugby league footballer who played for the Sydney Roosters in the Australian National Rugby League (NRL) competition. Tagive primarily played on the wing. Although a large winger, Tagive was a speedy athlete, recording 6.79 seconds over 60 metres. Tagive's parents are Fijian and African-American.

He is the older brother of rugby league & union player Ratu Tagive.

== Early life ==
Tagive was born in Campbelltown, New South Wales. Tagive played junior football with the East Campbelltown Eagles. He played S.G.Ball and Jersey Flegg for Western Suburbs Magpies before selection on the undefeated 2006 Australian Schoolboy tour alongside Tiger's teammate Chris Lawrence. Tagive was side-lined during 2007 following a shoulder reconstruction.

== Rugby League career ==
Tagive made his first-grade debut in round 1 of the 2008 season, playing for Wests Tigers against St George Illawarra Dragons.

Tagive was named in the Fiji training squad for the 2008 Rugby League World Cup, but was not selected to play.

In July, 2009 it was announced that Tagive had signed with the Dragons for two years from 2010 onwards. In his first trial match for the Dragons, he suffered an injury to his knee that was to rule him out for the season. By the time Tagive made his debut for his new club, in round 9 of 2011, he had undergone 5 major surgeries, including 2 shoulder reconstructions.

It was revealed on 3 August 2011 that Tagive had signed a two-year deal with the Sydney Roosters after the Dragons had released him from the final year of his contract. He played five games in first grade, for one win, in the middle of the 2012 season before injuring his hamstring. He ended the year playing for feeder team Newtown Jets that won the NSW Cup grand final.

At the end of 2012, Tagive retired, stating a desire to focus on his studies. "I want to thank everyone at the club for their support through the year and for supporting the decision I have made for my future, as I look ahead to life after footy," he said.

== American football ==
Tagive later moved to the United States to play collegiate American football at Baylor University. He was a defensive-end for the Baylor Bears.

== Rugby Union ==
Since returning to Australia, he has been playing rugby union for Wests in Canberra. In August 2015, he was named in the Canberra Vikings for the 2015 National Rugby Championship.
