= Campbelltown Harlequins RFC =

Australian rugby union club

Campbelltown Harlequins
- Full name: Campbelltown Harlequins Rugby Football Club
- Nickname(s): Quins
- Founded: 1972; 53 years ago
- Location: Campbelltown, Sydney, Australia
- Ground(s): Showgrounds, King St, Campbelltown
- League(s): Illawarra R.U.
Team kit

Official website
- www.campbelltownharlequins.com.au

The Campbelltown Harlequins Rugby Football Club, known as Campbelltown, is a rugby union club based in Campbelltown, in Sydney, Australia. The club was founded in 1972 and currently plays in the Illawarra Rugby Union competition, after previously competing in the First Division of the NSWSRU.

== History ==
=== Expansion: 1972 to 2002 ===
The Campbelltown Harlequin club was founded in 1972, initially playing with one team in the Sydney Suburban competition. The club transferred to the Illawarra competition for three seasons from 1974 to 1976, fielding first and second grade teams, and won the premiership in second grade and the Club Championship in 1974.

For the next eleven seasons Campbelltown played in Sydney. The club was in the District second division competition, winning premierships in first grade and fourth grade in 1978, before returning to Subbies in 1979. The club played most of the 1980s in Subbies divisions two and three.

In 1988 the Harlequins returned again to the Illawarra competition. In 1997, the club's 25th anniversary year, Campbelltown won the first grade premiership and club championship. After fourteen seasons, and with an expanded player base, the club went back to Sydney Subbies.

=== Recent events: 2003 onwards ===
Campbelltown won the Reliance Shield as club champions of the Subbbies second division in 2005 and were promoted to first division in 2006. After another twelve seasons in Subbies, Campbelltown decided to return once again to Illawarra for the 2015 season to allow the club to be more competitive.

== Colours and home ground ==
Campbelltown plays in a Harlequin-style jersey with red, green, black, and gold quarters and black shorts. The club's home grounds are at the Showgrounds on King St in Campbelltown, opposite the Campbelltown RSL club.

== Notable players ==
- Fotu Auelua - Campbelltown until 2003, Australia squad (2013)
