= Fotunu'upule Auelua =

NZ rugby union player

Fotu Auelua
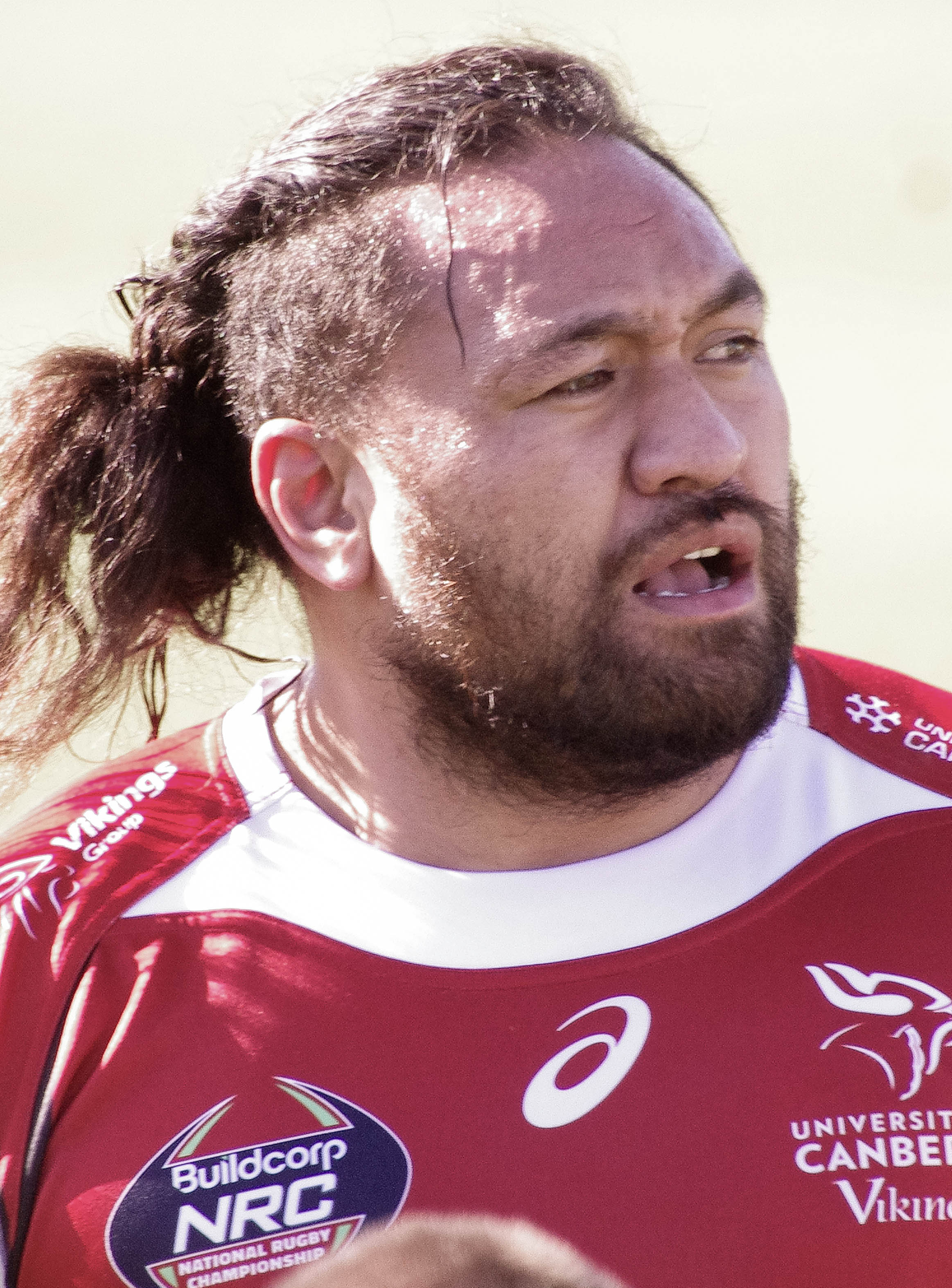
- Born: Fotunu'upule Auelua; 29 January 1984 (age 42) Wellington, New Zealand
- Height: 1.89 m (6 ft 2 1/2 in)
- Weight: 115 kg (18 st 2 lb)
- School: Trinity Grammar (NSW)

Rugby union career
- Position: Flanker / Number Eight
Amateur team(s)
Years	Team	Apps	(Points)
2003	Campbelltown Harlequins		
Senior career
Years	Team	Apps	(Points)
2003–2005	West Harbour		
2006−2007	Dax	50	(75)
2007–2010	Toulon	51	(35)
2011–2012	NTT Com Shining Arcs	9	(5)
2014	Canberra Vikings	8	(5)
2016−2017	Canon Eagles	1	(0)
- Correct as of 15 January 2017
Provincial / State sides
Years	Team	Apps	(Points)
2006	New South Wales		
Super Rugby
Years	Team	Apps	(Points)
2012–2015	Brumbies	33	(5)
- Correct as of 27 July 2014
International career
Years	Team	Apps	(Points)
2001–02	Australian Schoolboys		

Fotunu'upule Auelua (known as Fotu) is an Australian former rugby union player. He played at Number 8. He previously played for Brumbies in Super Rugby, Dax, Toulon and NTT Communications Shining Arcs.

== Early life ==
Auelua is of Samoan descent. He was born in Wellington but moved with his family to Campbelltown in Sydney at a young age, where he played most of his junior rugby for the Campbelltown Harlequins Rugby Club. He attended Trinity Grammar and played rugby for the Australian Schoolboys in 2001 and 2002.

== Career ==
Auelua played for West Harbour between 2003 and 2005.

In March 2010 he signed a two-year deal to join the Brumbies in 2012, with the Australian Rugby Union to pay part of his salary. In the interim, he rejoined his former West Harbour coach and mentor Joe Barakat at Tokyo-based NTT Communications club side from July 2011 to February 2012.

Auelua was named as captain of the Canberra Vikings for the inaugural season of Australia's National Rugby Championship in 2014.

=== Club ===
- Until 2003 : Campbelltown Harlequins (Australia)
- 2003–2005 : West Harbour (Australia)
- 2006–2007 : US Dax (France)
- 2007–2010 : RC Toulon (France)

== Honours ==
- Pro D2 Champions : 2008
- Winner of the Pro D2 finals: 2007

== Super Rugby statistics ==
As of 24 December 2014

Season	Team	Games	Starts	Sub	Mins	Tries	Cons	Pens	Drops	Points	Yel	Red
2012	Brumbies	8	6	2	381	1	0	0	0	5	0	0
2013	Brumbies	17	6	11	573	0	0	0	0	0	0	0
2014	Brumbies	8	3	5	299	0	0	0	0	0	1	0
Total		33	15	18	1253	1	0	0	0	5	1	0
