= Nick Scrivener =

Australian rugby union player & coach

- Born: Nicholas Scrivener; 1970 (age 55–56) Canberra, ACT
- School: Marist College Canberra

Rugby union career
- Position: Centre
Senior career
| Years | Team | Apps | (Points) |
| 1989–1996 | Tuggeranong | | |
| 1995 | Canberra Kookaburras | | |
Provincial / State sides
| Years | Team | Apps | (Points) |
| 1995 | Australian Capital Territory | | |
Super Rugby
| Years | Team | Apps | (Points) |
| 1996 | ACT Brumbies | | |
Coaching career
- Years: Team
- 2018–pres.: Canberra Vikings
- 2011–2012: ARU National Rugby Academy
- 2011: Edinburgh
- 2010–2011: Scotland A
- 2004, 2007: Canberra Vikings

Nick Scrivener (born 1970) is an Australian professional rugby union coach and former player for the ACT Brumbies. As of 2018, he is head coach of Australian National Rugby Championship team the Canberra Vikings, a team he coached previously in 2014 and 2007.

Scrivener was previously head coach at Edinburgh and for Scotland A. He was also an assistant coach for the Australian national team for three seasons from 2012 to 2014.

== Early life ==
Scrivener grew up in the Australian Capital Territory. He attended Marist College Canberra and played club rugby for Tuggeranong.

== Rugby career ==
Scrivener toured with the ACT representative side to New Zealand in 1995, before playing for the Canberra Kookaburras team in the NSW AAMI Cup that finished runner-up later that year. He was a foundation team member of the ACT Brumbies in the inaugural year of the Super 12 competition in 1996.

== Coaching career ==
In 1996, Scrivener began coaching with the ACT Rugby Union in Canberra schools. He became head coach of the ACT Rugby Academy, before joining the Brumbies as an assistant coach in 2000. Scrivener was head coach of the Canberra Vikings team for the Tooheys New Cup in 2004, and again for the Australian Rugby Championship in 2007. He was an assistant coach for Australia A in 2004, and also during the 2008 Pacific Nations Cup.

In 2009, after eight seasons at the Brumbies, Scrivener moved to Scotland where he had been signed by Edinburgh; initially as an assistant coach before taking over as head coach in 2011. He was also the head coach of the Scotland A team in 2010–11.

Scrivener returned to Australia to take up the head coaching position at the ARU's National Rugby Academy program in 2011. He was recruited by Wallabies coach Robbie Deans as an assistant coach for Australia in 2012 and continued as the defence coach with the Wallabies under new head coach Ewen McKenzie until October 2014. Scrivener moved to Japan in 2015 to take up a position as backs coach of Top League team Toyota Verblitz.

He was appointed head coach of the Canberra Vikings for the 2018 season of Australia's National Rugby Championship.
