= Nanocem =

Nanocem was a consortium of academic and private industry groups, founded in 2004 and headquartered in Lausanne, Switzerland. The consortium researched the properties of cement and concrete on the nano- and micro-scales, with a particular focus on reducing carbon dioxide emissions at all stages of production. In 2018, Nanocem included 34 organizations and supported more than 120 researchers. There were some 60 doctoral and postdoctoral research projects in the area of fundamental research that have been supported by Nanocem. The consortium ended its activities in at the end of 2022 and was absorbed into Innovandi.

== Description ==
The research is conducted at a fundamental level, though high levels of industry involvement allows for focus on solutions that can work in practice and not just in theory. This model of cooperation between industry and the academic community has led to the identification of common issues, shared knowledge, and clear benefits for all those involved. For instance, Nanocem has been able to help map the research needs for lower carbon concrete. This guidance helped focus research by companies and third parties.

== History ==
Nanocem was founded as an independent consortium in 2004 after a rejection of a 2002 bid to the Network of Excellence (European Framework Programme).

Nanocem's eleven completed core projects have included studies of interactions between admixtures and cement, concrete durability, the kinetics of cement hydration, and the use of magnetic resonance imaging techniques in concrete analysis. Recent Nanocem-sponsored projects have included the use of nanotechnology in cementitious materials, the effects of sulfate on concrete, the development of a bipolar mineral organic composite that can bond with Portland cement on one pole and polymerize with the other, and studies of cement hydration at the molecular level. Its research has led to more than one hundred published papers and conference papers.

The Nanocem consortium ended its activities in at the end of 2022 and was absorbed into Innovandi.

== Participating organizations ==
Nanocem consisted of 34 academic and private industry partners. The members of Nanocem collectively had access to a large range of state of the art equipment for the study of cementitious materials.

=== Academic ===
- Aarhus University
- Bauhaus-Universität Weimar
- Czech Technical University in Prague
- Danish Technological Institute
- École polytechnique fédérale de Lausanne
- ETH Zurich
- Eduardo Torroja Institute for Construction Science
- French Alternative Energies and Atomic Energy Commission
- French institute of science and technology for transport, spatial planning, development and networks
- Imperial College London
- Lund University
- Norwegian University of Science and Technology
- Polytechnic University of Catalonia
- Slovenian National Building and Civil Engineering Institute
- Swiss Federal Laboratories for Materials Science and Technology
- Technical University of Denmark
- Technical University of Munich
- University of Aberdeen
- University of Burgundy
- University of Leeds
- University of Sheffield
- University of Surrey
- vdz gGmbH
- Vienna University of Technology

=== Industrial ===
- Aalborg Portland
- BASF
- CHRYSO
- CRH
- HeidelbergCement
- GCP Applied Technologies
- LafargeHolcim
- Siam Cement
- Sika AG
- Titan Cement
