= Charles Scrivener =

Australian surveyor (1855–1923)

Charles Scrivener ISO
- Born: November 2, 1855; Windsor, New South Wales
- Died: September 26, 1923 (aged 67); Killara, New South Wales
- Occupations: Public servant, surveyor
- Board member of: Commonwealth Lands and Surveys
- Spouses: Eugenie Emmeline Rogers (m. 1878–1883) Mary Beatrice Harding (m. 1885–1886) Annie Margaret Pike (m. 1889)
- Children: Eight (five sons and three daughters)

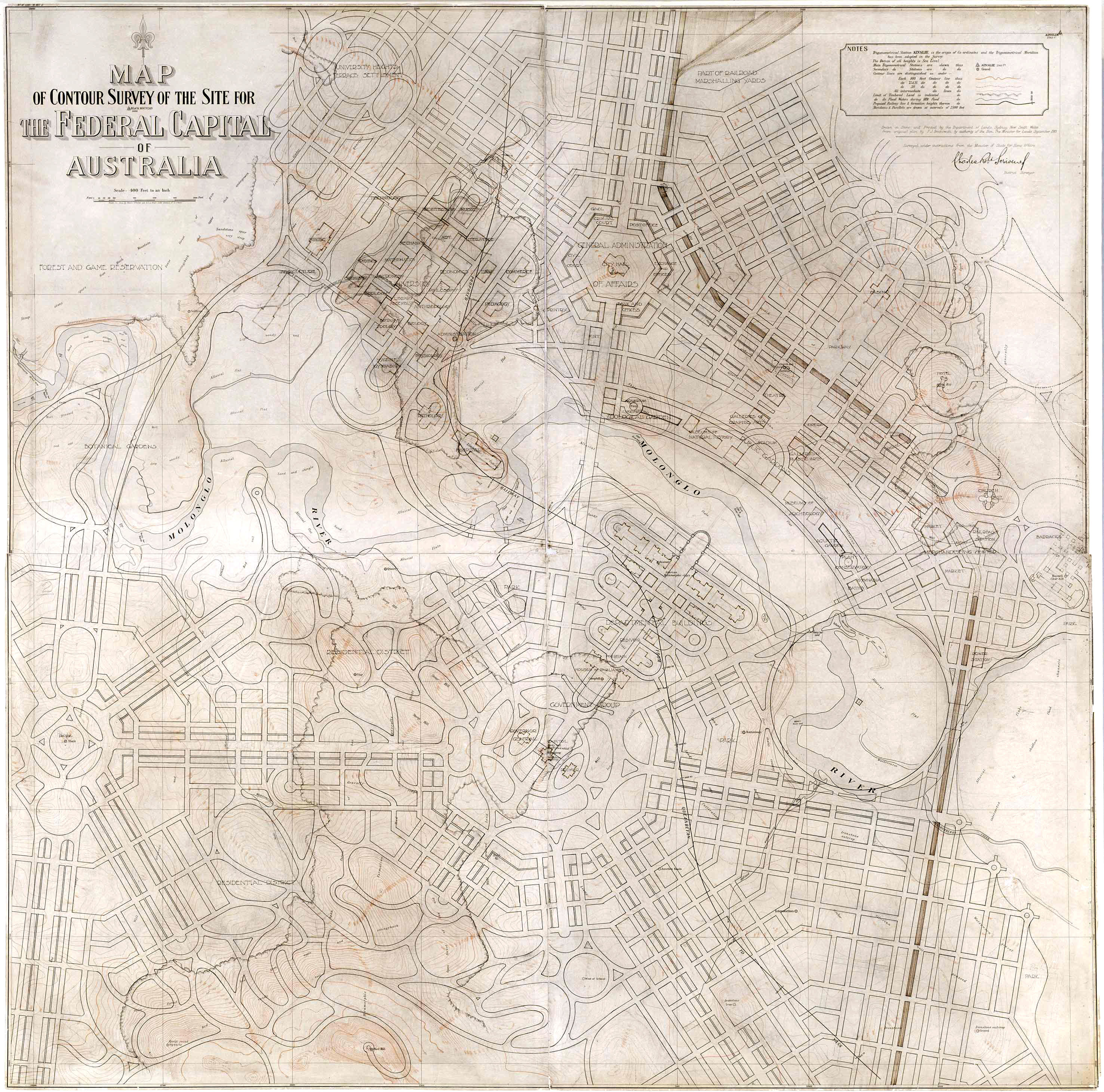
Griffin's plan for Canberra drawn on top of Scrivener's contour map of the area

Charles Robert Scrivener ISO (2 November 1855 – 26 September 1923) was an Australian surveyor, and the person who surveyed numerous sites in New South Wales for the selection of a site for the Australian Capital Territory and Australia's capital city, Canberra.

Scrivener was born in Windsor, New South Wales. In 1876, he was employed by the New South Wales Department of Lands. He was apprenticed as a surveyor between 1877 and 1879. On 9 July 1880, the government gazette announced that he had been licensed as a surveyor by the Surveyor-General. In 1888, Scrivener was appointed Surveyor in Maitland, New South Wales, by 1896 he was appointed as an Acting District Surveyor in Wagga Wagga and District Surveyor for Hay in 1906. He surveyed numerous sites for the construction of Australia's capital, including Buckley's Crossing, the Hay district, and lastly the Yass-Canberra district. Scrivener's contour map of the selected site was used as the basis for entries in the Canberra design competition. He was appointed first director of Commonwealth lands and surveys in 1910 and retired in 1915. He died aged 67 in Killara, New South Wales.

The Scrivener Dam impounding Lake Burley Griffin is named in his honour.
