= Scrivener Dam =

Dam in Canberra, Australia

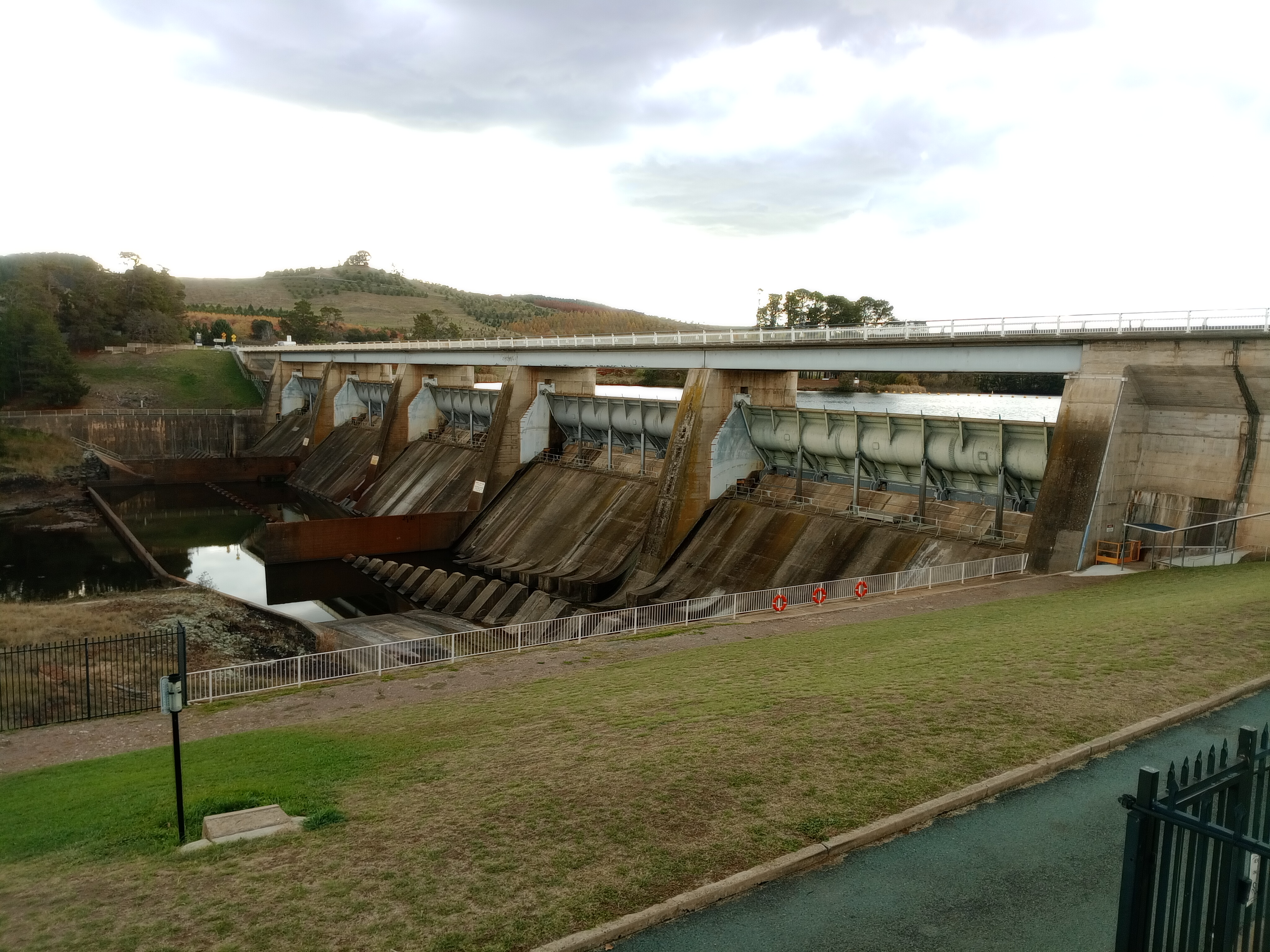
- The dam viewed from its lookout, 2025

- Location of the dam in the ACT
- Interactive map of Scrivener Dam
- Country: Australia
- Location: Canberra, ACT
- Coordinates: 35°17′58″S 149°04′19″E
- Purpose: Recreational and ornamental
- Status: Operational
- Construction began: September 1960
- Opening date: 20 September 1964
- Construction cost: A$5,039,050
- Owner: National Capital Authority

Dam and spillways
- Type of dam: Gravity dam
- Impounds: Molonglo River
- Height: 33 m (108 ft)
- Length: 235 m (771 ft)
- Width (crest): 19.7 m (65 ft)
- Width (base): 30.5 m (100 ft)
- Dam volume: 54×10^{3} m^{3} (1.9×10^{6} cu ft)
- Spillways: 5
- Spillway type: Hydraulic; fish-belly flap gates
- Spillway capacity: 8,500 m^{3}/s (300,000 cu ft/s)

Reservoir
- Creates: Lake Burley Griffin
- Total capacity: 330,000 ML (270,000 acre⋅ft)
- Active capacity: 27,740 ML (22,490 acre⋅ft)
- Catchment area: 1,880 km^{2} (730 sq mi)
- Surface area: 720 ha (1,800 acres)
- Maximum length: 11 km (6.8 mi)
- Maximum width: 1.2 km (0.75 mi)
- Maximum water depth: 18 m (59 ft)
- Normal elevation: 547 m (1,795 ft) AHD

Commonwealth Heritage List
- Official name: Lake Burley Griffin and Adjacent Lands
- Type: Historic
- Designated: 8 April 2022
- Reference no.: 105230

The Scrivener Dam is a concrete gravity dam across the Molonglo River in Canberra, in the Australian Capital Territory. The dam impounds Lake Burley Griffin, an artificial lake created for recreational and ornamental purposes. Named in honour of surveyor Charles Scrivener, the dam was officially inaugurated on 20 September 1963 and the filling of the lake was commemorated on 17 October 1964 by the Prime Minister, Robert Menzies.

The heritage-listed dam wall is located on Lady Denman Drive and is adjacent to the National Zoo & Aquarium and a viewing area for the official residence of the Governor-General of Australia.

== Technical details ==
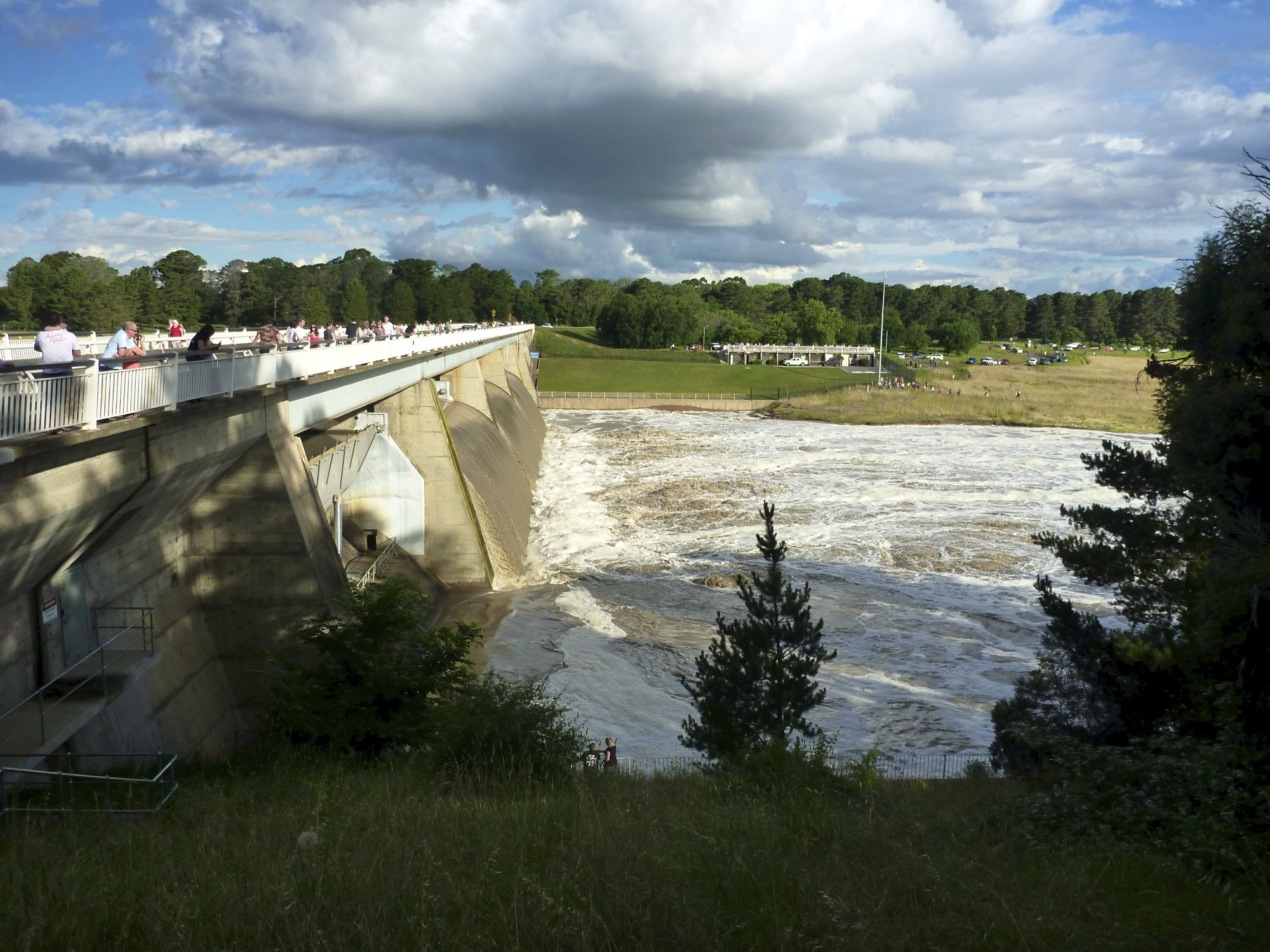
Scrivener Dam with three open fish belly floodgates, 2010

Scrivener Dam, designed in Germany, holds back the waters of the Molonglo River within Lake Burley Griffin. About 55,000 cubic metres (1,900,000 cu ft) of concrete was used in the construction of the dam wall. The dam is 33 metres (108 ft) high and 235 metres (771 ft) long with a maximum wall thickness of 19.7 metres (65 ft). The dam is designed to handle a once in 5,000 year flood event.

It utilised state-of-the-art post-tensioning techniques to cope with any problems or movements in the riverbed.

The dam has five bay spillways controlled by 30.5-metre-wide (100 ft) hydraulically operated fish-belly flap gates. Hinge anchors support the flap gates; with six hinges per gate, and four anchors per hinge. The fish-belly gates allow for a precise control of water level, reducing the dead area on the banks between high and low water levels. As at November 2010, the five gates have only been opened simultaneously once in the dam's history, during heavy flooding in 1976.

The dam wall provides a crossing for the lake and consists of a roadway, called Lady Denman Drive, and a bicycle path. The roadway was possible because the dam gates are closed by pushing up from below, unlike most previous designs that wherein the gates were lifted from above.

=== Dam maintenance ===
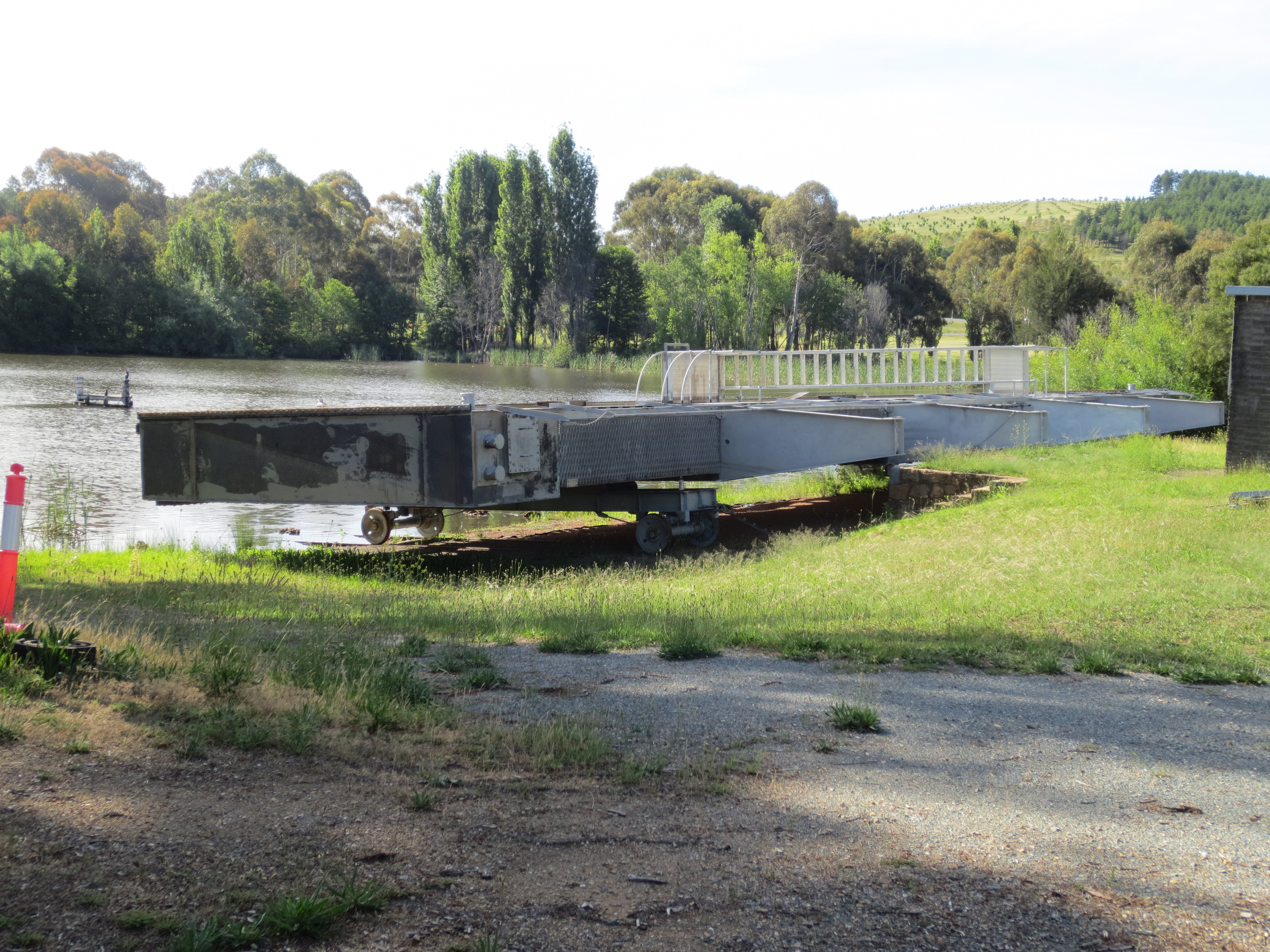
Floating maintenance barrier for the dam stored at Yarramundi Reach, 2015

The National Capital Authority, a statutory authority of the Australian Government, is responsible for the administration and oversight of Scrivener Dam, as the dam lies within the Designated Area, under the Australian Capital Territory (Planning and Land Management) Act, 1988 (Cth). The Authority manages external contractors to deliver services that are competitively tendered.

A 2011 routine annual audit of the dam wall revealed that the anchor bolts, which are part of the flap gate hinge mechanism, showed signs of corrosion. These bolts, of which there are 120 in total, are each 50 millimetres (2.0 in) in diameter and 2 metres (6 ft 7 in) long. It was anticipated that work would be completed by the end of 2013, and cost A$20 million.

Further repairs were initiated in 2025 to strengthen the dissipator that was at risk of failure during flooding events. As of April 2026, the work was ongoing.

=== Flood mitigation ===
The Scrivener Dam is operated in an environment that minimises flooding of the environs of Lake Burley Griffin. Flows of 2,000 cubic metres per second (71,000 cu ft/s) and above at the dam spillway are achieved with all five flap gates open and are able to maintain the normal level of the Lake at 555.93 metres (1,823.9 ft), measured at the East Basin. With three sluice valves open, outflows of 55 m^{3}/s (1,900 cu ft/s) can be achieved through either automatic or manual operation of the dam. A minimum base flow of 0.03 m^{3}/s (1.1 cu ft/s) is required in the Molonglo River, downstream of Scrivener Dam at the gauging station below Coppins Crossing.

== History ==
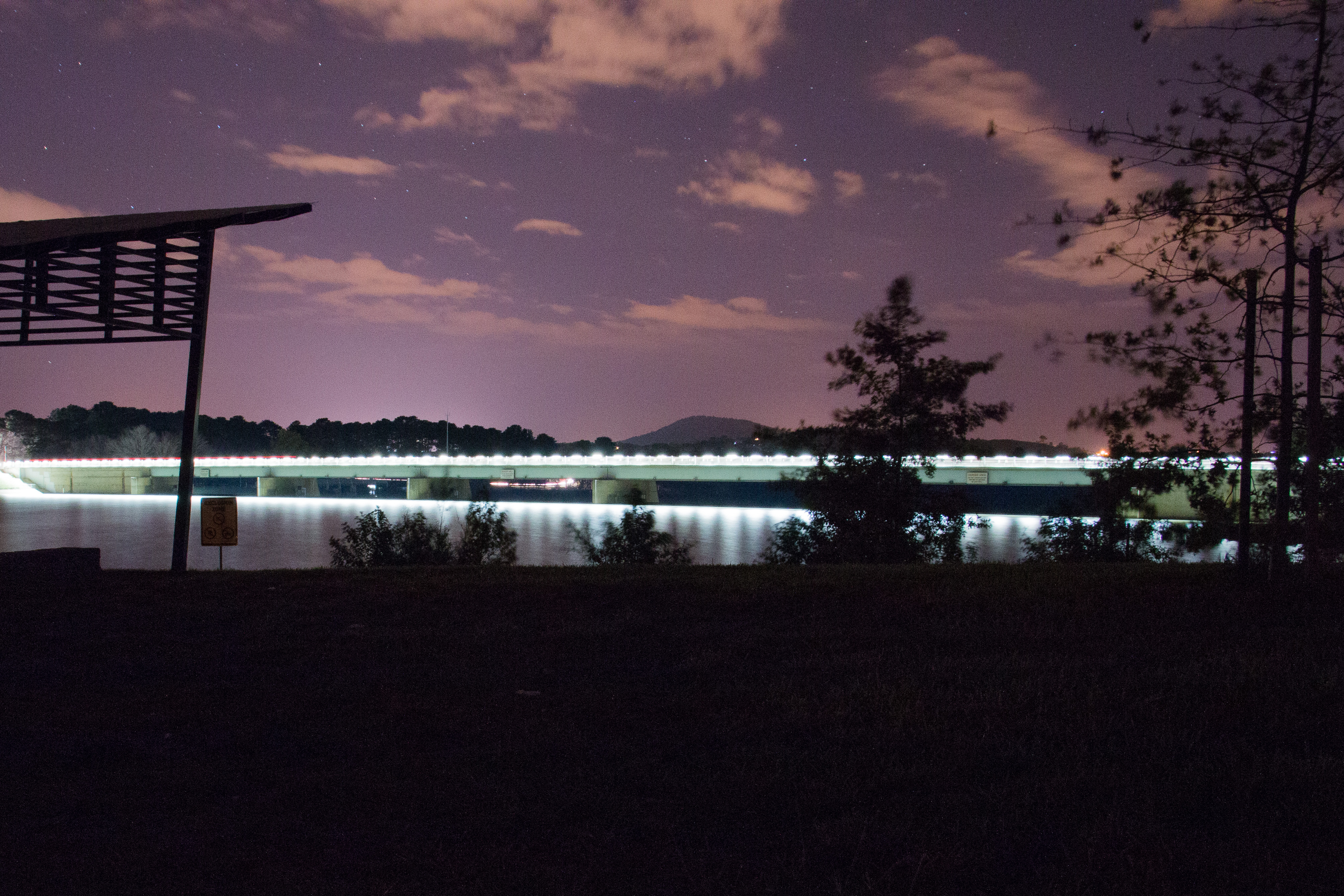
Lights of the dam at night

=== Lake filling ===
A prolonged drought coincided with and eased work on the lake's construction. The valves on the Scrivener Dam were closed on 20 September 1963 by Interior Minister Gordon Freeth; Prime Minister Menzies was absent due to ill health. Several months on, with no rain in sight, mosquito-infested pools of water were the only visible sign of the lake filling. With the eventual breaking of the drought and several days of heavy rain, the lake filled, and reached the planned level on 29 April 1964.

On 17 October 1964, Menzies commemorated the filling of the lake and the completion of stage one with an opening ceremony amid the backdrop of sailing craft. This was accompanied by fireworks display, and Griffin's lake had finally come to fruition after five decades, at the cost of A$5,039,050.

== Heritage status ==
The dam, together with Lake Burley Griffin and adjacent lands, was listed on the former Register of the National Estate, a defunct register, frozen in 2012, that listed places of significant natural and cultural heritage. In 2022, the dam was included on the Commonwealth Heritage List as part of the listing for Lake Burley Griffin and adjacent lands.

== See also ==
- History of Canberra
- History of Lake Burley Griffin
