= 2018 Queensland Reds season =

Queensland Reds
- 2018 season
- Coach: Brad Thorn
- Chairman: Jeff Miller
- Super Rugby: 4th (Australian conference); 13th (Overall)
- Top try scorer: League: Filipo Daugunu (6 tries)
- Top points scorer: League: Jono Lance (101 points)
Home colours	Away colours

The 2018 Queensland Reds season was the club's 22nd season since the inception of Super Rugby in 1996.

== Squad ==
=== Current squad ===
The Queensland Reds squad for the 2018 season: (Note: Quade Cooper, Nick Frisby and Markus Vanzati were initially named in the squad, but later excluded and not required to train with the rest of the squad. Frisby was subsequently loaned out to Bordeaux.) (Note: Teti Tela, Aidan Toua and Ruan Smith were not initially included in the squad, but was subsequently added.) (Note: Karmichael Hunt was included in the Reds' squad, but subsequently voluntarily stood down after he was arrested and pleaded guilty to the possession of alprazolam.) (Note: Jordan Petaia was not initially included in the squad, but was named in the matchday squad for their match against the Brumbies.) (Note: Jayden Ngamanu was not initially included in the squad, but was named as a late replacement for their match against the Brumbies.)

Reds Super Rugby squad
**Props**: (Australia) Sef Fa'agase; (Australia) Harry Hoopert; (Australia) **James Slipper**; (South Africa) JP Smith; (South Africa) Ruan Smith; (Australia) **Taniela Tupou**; (Australia) Markus Vanzati; **Hookers**: (Australia) Alex Mafi; (Australia) **Brandon Paenga-Amosa**; (Australia) Andrew Ready; **Locks**: (Australia) Angus Blyth; (Australia) **Kane Douglas**; (Australia) Harry Hockings; (Australia) **Izack Rodda**; (Australia) **Lukhan Tui**	**Loose forwards**: (Australia) Michael Gunn; (Australia) Reece Hewat; (Australia) **Scott Higginbotham** (c); (Australia) Adam Korczyk; (Australia) Angus Scott-Young; (Australia) **George Smith**; (Australia) **Caleb Timu**; (Australia) Liam Wright; **Scrum-halves**: (Australia) Tate McDermott; (Australia) Moses Sorovi; (Australia) James Tuttle; **Fly-halves**: (Australia) **Quade Cooper**; (Australia) Jono Lance; (Australia) Ben Lucas; (Australia) Hamish Stewart; (Fiji) Teti Tela	**Centres**: (Australia) **Chris Feauai-Sautia**; (Australia) **Samu Kerevi**; (Australia) Duncan Paia'aua; (Australia) Jordan Petaia; **Wingers**: (Fiji) Filipo Daugunu; (Australia) Lachlan Maranta; (Australia) **Eto Nabuli**; (Australia) Jayden Ngamanu; (Australia) Izaia Perese; **Fullbacks**: (Australia) **Karmichael Hunt**; (Australia) Aidan Toua
(c) Denotes team captain and **Bold** denotes internationally capped.

=== Transfers ===
In:

Player	Position	Previous club	Notes
Harry Hoopert	Prop	Brothers	
JP Smith	Prop	University of the Sunshine Coast	
Ruan Smith	Prop	Toyota Verblitz	
Brandon Paenga-Amosa	Hooker	NSW Country Eagles	
Angus Blyth	Lock	Bond University	
Harry Hockings	Lock	University of Queensland	
Angus Scott-Young	Flanker	Queensland Country	
Liam Wright	Flanker	Queensland Country	
Tate McDermott	Scrum-half	Queensland Country	
Jono Lance	Fly-half	Western Force	
Ben Lucas	Fly-half	Toyota Verblitz	
Teti Tela	Fly-half	Queensland Country	
Jordan Petaia	Centre	Brisbane State High School	
Filipo Daugunu	Wing	Queensland Country	
Aidan Toua	Fullback	Brumbies	

Out:

Player	Position	Previous club	Notes
Phil Kite	Prop	Vannes	
Kirwan Sanday	Prop	Queensland Country	
Sam Talakai	Prop	Rebels	
David McDuling	Lock	Sydney Rays	
Stephen Moore	Hooker		Retired
Cadeyrn Neville	Lock	Toyota Jido Shokki	
Rob Simmons	Lock	Waratahs	
Leroy Houston	Flanker	Bordeaux	
Hendrik Tui	Number eight	Suntory Sungoliath	
Nick Frisby	Scrum-half	Bordeaux	
Jake McIntyre	Fly-half	Agen	
Campbell Magnay	Centre	Suntory Sungoliath	
Henry Taefu	Centre	Colomiers	
Chris Kuridrani	Wing	Brisbane City	

== Season summary ==
=== Season results ===
Rnd	Date & local time		Team	Score	Venue	Attendance	Ref.
1	Bye						
2	Friday, 23 February (7:45 pm)	A	Rebels	45–19	AAMI Park, Melbourne, Victoria, Australia	10,021	
3	Saturday, 2 March (7:00 pm)	H	Brumbies	18–10	Suncorp Stadium, Brisbane, Queensland, Australia	11,034	
4	Saturday, 10 March (6:45 pm)	H	Bulls	20–14	Suncorp Stadium, Brisbane, Queensland, Australia	11,827	
5	Saturday, 17 March (6:40 pm)	A	Jaguares	7–19	Estadio José Amalfitani, Buenos Aires, Argentina		
6	Saturday, 24 March (5:15 pm)	A	Stormers	25–19	Newlands Stadium, Cape Town, Western Cape, South Africa		
7	Bye						
8	Saturday, 7 April (7:45 pm)	A	Brumbies	45–21	Canberra Stadium, Canberra, Australian Capital Territory, Australia	7,598	
9	Saturday, 14 April (7:45 pm)	A	Waratahs	37–16	Sydney Cricket Ground, Sydney, New South Wales, Australia	15,648	
10	Saturday, 21 April (7:45 pm)	H	Chiefs	12–36	Suncorp Stadium, Brisbane, Queensland, Australia	14,002	
11	Saturday, 28 April (3:05 pm)	H	Lions	27–22	Suncorp Stadium, Brisbane, Queensland, Australia	12,368	
12	Bye						
13	Saturday, 12 May (12:05 pm)	A	Sunwolves	63–28	Prince Chichibu Memorial Stadium, Tokyo, Kantō, Japan		
14	Friday, 18 May (7:35 pm)	A	Hurricanes	38–34	Westpac Stadium, Wellington, New Zealand		
15	Saturday, 26 May (7:45 pm)	H	Highlanders	15–18	Suncorp Stadium, Brisbane, Queensland, Australia	11,729	
16	Saturday, 2 June (7:45 pm)	H	Waratahs	41–52	Suncorp Stadium, Brisbane, Queensland, Australia	14,452	
17	Friday, 29 June (7:35 pm)	A	Blues	39–16	Eden Park, Auckland, New Zealand		
18	Friday, 6 July (7:45 pm)	H	Rebels	37–23	Suncorp Stadium, Brisbane, Queensland, Australia	10,340	
19	Friday, 13 July (7:45 pm)	H	Sunwolves	48–27	Suncorp Stadium, Brisbane, Queensland, Australia	11,057	

=== Standings ===
Australian Conference
Pos	Team	P	W	D	L	PF	PA	PD	TF	TA	TB	LB	Pts
3	(Australia) Brumbies	16	7	0	9	393	422	–29	56	52	2	4	34
4	(Australia) Reds	16	6	0	10	389	501	−112	49	66	1	3	28
5	(Japan) Sunwolves	16	3	0	13	404	664	−260	48	99	0	2	14

Overall standings
Pos	Team	P	W	D	L	PF	PA	PD	TF	TA	TB	LB	Pts
12	(South Africa) Bulls	16	6	0	10	441	502	−61	59	66	2	3	29
13	(Australia) Reds	16	6	0	10	389	501	−112	49	66	1	3	28
14	(New Zealand) Blues	16	4	0	12	378	509	−131	50	66	2	4	22

== Statistics ==
Top point scorer
No.	Player	Pos.	T	Pen	Con	Pts
1	Jono Lance	Fly-half	2	15	23	101
2	James Tuttle	Scrum-half	0	10	5	40
3	Filipo Daugunu	Wing	6	1	2	37
4	Caleb Timu	Number eight	5	0	0	25
5	Brandon Paenga-Amosa	Hooker	4	0	0	20
5	Taniela Tupou	Prop	4	0	0	20
5	Samu Kerevi	Centre	4	0	0	20
8	Duncan Paia'aua	Centre	3	0	0	15
8	Alex Mafi	Hooker	3	0	0	15

Top try scorer
No.	Player	Pos.	T
1	Filipo Daugunu	Wing	6
2	Caleb Timu	Number eight	5
3	Brandon Paenga-Amosa	Hooker	4
3	Taniela Tupou	Prop	4
3	Samu Kerevi	Centre	4
6	Duncan Paia'aua	Centre	3
6	Alex Mafi	Hooker	3
8	Chris Feauai-Sautia	Centre	2
8	Jono Lance	Fly-half	2
8	Eto Nabuli	Wing	2
8	Jordan Petaia	Centre	2
