= 2018 New South Wales Waratahs season =

New South Wales Waratahs
- 2018 season
- Coach: Daryl Gibson
- Chairman: Roger Davis
- Super Rugby: 1st (Australian conference); 3rd (Overall)
- Super Rugby finals: Semi-finals
- Top try scorer: League: Taqele Naiyaravoro (15 tries)
- Top points scorer: League: Bernard Foley (223 points)
Home colours	Away colours

The 2018 New South Wales Waratahs season was the club's 22nd season since the inception of Super Rugby in 1996.

== Squad ==
=== Current squad ===
The squad for the 2018 season: (Note: Duffy was not included in the original squad, but was named in their matchday squad for their match against the Jaguares.) (Note: Snowden was not included in the original squad, but was named in their matchday squad for their match against the Rebels.) (Note: Tawake was not included in the original squad, but was named in their matchday squad for their match against the Sharks.)

Waratahs Super Rugby squad
**Props**: (Australia) Harry Johnson-Holmes; (Australia) **Sekope Kepu**; (Australia) **Tom Robertson**; (Australia) **Paddy Ryan**; (Australia) Matt Sandell; (Australia) Shambeckler Vui; (Australia) Cody Walker; (Fiji) **Kalivati Tawake** ^{ST}; **Hookers**: (Australia) Damien Fitzpatrick; (Australia) **Tolu Latu**; (Australia) Hugh Roach; (Australia) JP Sauni; **Locks**: (Australia) **Ned Hanigan**; (Australia) Ryan McCauley; (Australia) Nick Palmer; (Australia) **Rob Simmons**; (Australia) Tom Staniforth	**Loose forwards**: (Australia) **Jack Dempsey**; (Australia) Jed Holloway; (Australia) **Michael Hooper**; (Australia) Maclean Jones; (Samoa) Kelly Meafua; (Australia) Will Miller; (Australia) Lachlan Swinton; (Australia) Michael Wells; (Australia) Brad Wilkin; **Scrum-halves**: (Australia) Jake Gordon; (Australia) **Nick Phipps**; (Australia) Nick Duffy ^{ST}; (Australia) Mitch Short ^{ST}; (Australia) Michael Snowden ^{ST}; **Fly-halves**: (Australia) **Bernard Foley**; (Australia) Bryce Hegarty; (Australia) Mack Mason	**Centres**: (Australia) **Kurtley Beale**; (Australia) Lalakai Foketi; (Australia) Alex Newsome; (Australia) Irae Simone; **Wingers**: (Australia) Cameron Clark; (Australia) Andrew Kellaway; (Australia) **Taqele Naiyaravoro**; (Australia) **Curtis Rona**; **Fullbacks**: (Australia) **Israel Folau**
(c) Denotes team captain, **Bold** denotes internationally capped and ^{ST} indicated short-term cover.

=== Transfers ===
In:

Player	Position	Previous club	Notes
Harry Johnson-Holmes	Prop	New South Wales Country Eagles	
Kalivati Tawake	Prop	Fijian Drua	Short-term contract
Shambeckler Vui	Prop	Western Force	
Cody Walker	Prop	Sydney Rays	
JP Sauni	Hooker	Auckland	
Nick Palmer	Lock	Hawke's Bay	
Rob Simmons	Lock	Queensland Reds	
Tom Staniforth	Lock	Brumbies	
Kelly Meafua	Flanker	Greater Sydney Rams	
Will Miller	Flanker	Rebels	
Lachlan Swinton	Flanker	New South Wales Country Eagles	
Nick Duffy	Scrum-half	Sydney Rays	Short-term contract
Mitch Short	Scrum-half	Western Force	Short-term contract
Michael Snowden	Scrum-half	Rebels	Short-term contract
Kurtley Beale	Centre	Wasps	
Lalakai Foketi	Centre	Bay of Plenty	
Alex Newsome	Centre	Western Force	
Curtis Rona	Centre	Western Force	

Out:

Player	Position	Previous club	Notes
Dave Lolohea	Prop	Sydney Rays	
Sam Needs	Prop	New South Wales Country Eagles	
Angus Ta'avao	Prop	Chiefs	
David McDuling	Lock	Sydney Rays	
Dean Mumm	Lock		Retired
Will Skelton	Lock	Saracens	
Senio Toleafoa	Lock	Nevers	
Matt Lucas	Scrum-half	Brumbies	
Andrew Deegan	Fly-half	Connacht	
Rob Horne	Centre	Northampton Saints	
Dave Horwitz	Centre	Rebels	
Reece Robinson	Wing	Sydney Roosters (NRL)	
Harry Jones	Fullback	Toyota Jido Shokki	

== Season summary ==
=== Season results ===
Rnd	Date & local time		Team	Score	Venue	Attendance	Ref.
1	Bye						
2	Saturday, 24 February (7:45 pm)	H	Stormers	34–27	Allianz Stadium, Sydney, New South Wales, Australia	11,087	
3	Saturday, 3 March (3:03 pm)	A	Sharks	24–24	Kings Park Stadium, Durban, KwaZulu-Natal, South Africa	14,143	
4	Saturday, 10 March (6:40 pm)	A	Jaguares	38–28	José Amalfitani Stadium, Buenos Aires, Argentina	5,203	
5	Sunday, 18 March (4:05 pm)	H	Rebels	51–27	Allianz Stadium, Sydney, New South Wales, Australia	11,652	
6	Bye						
7	Saturday, 31 March (7:45 pm)	A	Brumbies	17–24	GIO Stadium, Canberra, Australian Capital Territory, Australia	13,515	
8	Saturday, 7 April (2:15 pm)	A	Sunwolves	29–50	Prince Chichibu Memorial Stadium, Tokyo, Kantō, Japan	9,707	
9	Saturday, 14 April (7:45 pm)	H	Reds	37–16	Sydney Cricket Ground, Sydney, New South Wales, Australia	15,648	
10	Friday, 20 April (7:45 pm)	H	Lions	0–29	Allianz Stadium, Sydney, New South Wales, Australia	10,614	
11	Bye						
12	Saturday, 5 May (7:45 pm)	H	Blues	21–24	Brookvale Oval, Brookvale, New South Wales, Australia	13,013	
13	Saturday, 12 May (5:15 pm)	A	Crusaders	31–29	AMI Stadium, Christchurch, Canterbury, New Zealand	11,597	
14	Saturday, 19 May (7:45 pm)	H	Highlanders	41–12	Allianz Stadium, Sydney, New South Wales, Australia	12,308	
15	Saturday, 26 May (7:35 pm)	A	Chiefs	39–27	FMG Stadium Waikato, Hamilton, Waikato, New Zealand	10,747	
16	Saturday, 2 June (7:45 pm)	A	Reds	41–52	Suncorp Stadium, Brisbane, Queensland, Australia	14,452	
17	Friday, 29 June (7:45 pm)	A	Rebels	26–31	AAMI Park, Melbourne, Victoria, Australia	9,208	
18	Saturday, 7 July (7:45 pm)	H	Sunwolves	77–25	Allianz Stadium, Sydney, New South Wales, Australia	18,059	
19	Saturday, 14 July (7:45 pm)	H	Brumbies	31–40	Allianz Stadium, Sydney, New South Wales, Australia	17,155	
QF	Saturday, 21 July (8:05 pm)	H	Highlanders	30–23	Allianz Stadium, Sydney, New South Wales, Australia	12,067	
SF	Saturday, 28 July	A	Lions	44–26	Ellis Park Stadium, Johannesburg, Gauteng, South Africa		

=== Standings ===
Australian Conference
Pos	Team	P	W	D	L	PF	PA	PD	TF	TA	TB	LB	Pts
1	(Australia) Waratahs	16	9	1	6	557	445	+112	74	59	4	2	44
2	(Australia) Rebels	16	7	0	9	440	461	–21	57	60	5	3	36
3	(Australia) Brumbies	16	7	0	9	393	422	–29	56	52	2	4	34

Overall standings
Pos	Team	P	W	D	L	PF	PA	PD	TF	TA	TB	LB	Pts
2	(South Africa) Lions	16	9	0	7	519	435	+84	77	55	6	4	46
3	(Australia) Waratahs	16	9	1	6	557	445	+112	74	59	4	2	44
4	(New Zealand) Hurricanes	16	11	0	5	474	343	+131	66	43	5	2	51

=== Finals ===
Qualifiers
21 July – Christchurch
Crusaders	40
Sharks	10
20 July – Wellington
Hurricanes	32
Chiefs	31
21 July – Johannesburg
Lions	40
Jaguares	23
21 July – Sydney
Waratahs	30
Highlanders	23

Semi-finals
28 July – Christchurch
Crusaders	30
Hurricanes	12
28 July – Johannesburg
Lions	44
Waratahs	26

Final
4 August – Christchurch
Crusaders	37
Lions	18

== Statistics ==
Top point scorer
No.	Player	Pos.	Tries	Pen	Con	Pts
1	Bernard Foley	Fly-half	4	24	68	223
2	Taqele Naiyaravoro	Wing	15	0	0	75
3	Israel Folau	Fullback	11	0	0	55
4	Curtis Rona	Wing	7	0	0	35
5	Jake Gordon	Scrum-half	6	0	0	30
6	Michael Hooper	Flanker	4	0	0	20
6	Ned Hanigan	Lock	4	0	0	20
6	Cameron Clark	Wing	4	0	0	20
6	Will Miller	Flanker	4	0	0	20

Top try scorer
No.	Player	Pos.	Tries
1	Taqele Naiyaravoro	Wing	15
2	Israel Folau	Fullback	11
3	Curtis Rona	Wing	7
4	Jake Gordon	Scrum-half	6
5	Bernard Foley	Fly-half	4
5	Michael Hooper	Flanker	4
5	Ned Hanigan	Lock	4
5	Cameron Clark	Wing	4
5	Will Miller	Flanker	4
