= List of 2018 Super Rugby matches =

This article contains a list of all matches played during the 2018 Super Rugby regular season.

== Round 1 ==
Round 1 consisted of matches in the South African Conference only.

17 February 2018
15:05

Stormers	28–20	Jaguares
Try: Damian de Allende 19'; Siya Kolisi 32'; Raymond Rhule 41'; Con: Damian Willemse 20', 42'; Pen: Damian Willemse 28', 57', 80'; Cards: Ramone Samuels (yellow card) 65' to 75'	Report; Scoreboard	Try: Emiliano Boffelli 46' penalty try 68'; Con: Nicolás Sánchez 47'; Pen: Nicolás Sánchez 5'; Emiliano Boffelli 22'; Cards: Joaquín Tuculet (yellow card) 27' to 37'

DHL Newlands, Cape Town
Attendance: 18,093
Referee: Jaco Peyper

17 February 2018
17:15

Lions	26–19	Sharks
Try: Lionel Mapoe 17', 52'; Aphiwe Dyantyi 22'; Kwagga Smith 59'; Con: Elton Jantjies 18', 24', 53'	Report; Scoreboard	Try: Robert du Preez 8'; S'busiso Nkosi 42'; Makazole Mapimpi 55'; Con: Robert du Preez 9', 56'

Emirates Airline Park, Johannesburg
Attendance: 25,739
Referee: Glen Jackson

Bye/s: Bulls

== Round 2 ==
23 February 2018
19:35

Highlanders	41–34	Blues
Try: Rob Thompson 20', 31'; Siate Tokolahi 44'; Teihorangi Walden 57', 61'; Con: Lima Sopoaga 22', 32', 45', 58', 62'; Pen: Lima Sopoaga 10'; Fletcher Smith 69'	Report; Scoreboard	Try: Bryn Gatland 15'; Matt Duffie 24'; Akira Ioane 39', 46'; Con: Bryn Gatland 16', 26', 39', 47'; Pen: Bryn Gatland 40', 67'; Cards: Antonio Kiri Kiri (yellow card) 54' to 64'

Forsyth Barr Stadium, Dunedin
Attendance: 16,687
Referee: Jamie Nutbrown

23 February 2018
19:45

Rebels	45–19	Reds
Try: Sefa Naivalu 25', 34'; Tom English 31'; Dane Haylett-Petty 38', 47'; Jack Debreczeni 42', 56'; Con: Jack Debreczeni 25', 31', 39', 43', 57'	Report; Scoreboard	Try: Duncan Paia'aua 20'; Samu Kerevi 28'; Chris Feauai-Sautia 67'; Con: James Tuttle 20', 28'; Cards: Scott Higginbotham (red card) 10'; Lukhan Tui (yellow card) 23' to 33'

AAMI Park, Melbourne
Attendance: 10,021
Referee: Brendon Pickerill

24 February 2018
13:15

Sunwolves	25–32	Brumbies
Try: Hosea Saumaki 9', 29'; Timothy Lafaele 19'; Con: Ryoto Nakamura 10'; Hayden Parker 20'; Pen: Hayden Parker 65', 80'	Report; Scoreboard	Try: Lachlan McCaffrey 24'; Kyle Godwin 35'; Tevita Kuridrani 42'; Joshua Mann-Rea 53'; Tom Banks 68'; Con: Christian Lealiifano 36', 43'; Pen: Christian Lealiifano 6'

Prince Chichibu Memorial Stadium, Tokyo
Attendance: 14,614
Referee: Paul Williams

24 February 2018
19:35

Crusaders	45–23	Chiefs
Try: Matt Todd 5'; Richie Mo'unga 13'; Jordan Taufua 30'; Sam Whitelock 62' penalty try 71'; George Bridge 75'; Manasa Mataele 77'; Con: Richie Mo'unga 14', 63', 76'; David Havili 31'; Cards: Richie Mo'unga (yellow card) 20' to 30'; Michael Alaalatoa (yellow card) 35' to 45'	Report; Scoreboard	Try: Sam Cane 33'; Solomon Alaimalo 40'; Con: Damian McKenzie 34', 40'; Pen: Damian McKenzie 18', 57', 67'; Cards: Lachlan Boshier (yellow card) 71'

AMI Stadium, Christchurch
Referee: Ben O'Keeffe

24 February 2018
19:45

Waratahs	34–27	Stormers
Try: Israel Folau 18'; Michael Hooper 29'; Damien Fitzpatrick 43'; Ned Hanigan 80'; Con: Bernard Foley 19', 30', 44', 80'; Pen: Bernard Foley 15', 65'; Cards: Rob Simmons (yellow card) 57' to 67'	Report; Scoreboard	Try: Steven Kitshoff 15'; Kobus van Dyk 36'; SP Marais 51'; Con: SP Marais 17', 37', 52'; Pen: SP Marais 22', 67'

Allianz Stadium, Sydney
Attendance: 11,087
Referee: Angus Gardner

24 February 2018
15:05

Lions	47–27	Jaguares
Try: Aphiwe Dyantyi 27', 52' penalty try 33'; Andries Coetzee 39'; Sylvian Mahuza 47'; Rohan Janse van Rensburg 64'; Warren Whiteley 79'; Con: Elton Jantjies 40', 48', 53', 65', 80'	Report; Scoreboard	Try: Emiliano Boffelli 3'; Bautista Delguy 72', 76'; Con: Nicolás Sánchez 4', 72', 76'; Pen: Emiliano Boffelli 18'; Nicolás Sánchez 51'; Cards: Bautista Delguy (yellow card) 33' to 43'; Julián Montoya (yellow card) 71'

Emirates Airline Park, Johannesburg
Attendance: 10,060
Referee: Jaco Peyper

24 February 2018
17:15

Bulls	21–19	Hurricanes
Try: Johnny Kôtze 4'; Lood de Jager 33'; Pierre Schoeman 72'; Pen: Handré Pollard 7', 40'; Cards: Pierre Schoeman (yellow card) 25' to 35'	Report; Scoreboard	Try: Ricky Riccitelli 12'; Wes Goosen 18'; Beauden Barrett 59'; Con: Ihaia West 19', 60'

Loftus Versfeld, Pretoria
Attendance: 9,506
Referee: Rasta Rasivhenge

Bye/s: Sharks

== Round 3 ==
2 March 2018
19:35

Blues	21–27	Chiefs
Try: Augustine Pulu 8'; Akira Ioane 22'; Bryn Gatland 61'; Con: Bryn Gatland 8', 23', 62'	Report; Scoreboard	Try: Taleni Seu 13'; Sean Wainui 26'; Sam Cane 48'; Brad Weber 50'; Con: Damian McKenzie 49', 51'; Pen: Damian McKenzie 56'

Eden Park, Auckland
Attendance: 17,050
Referee: Ben O'Keeffe

2 March 2018
19:00

Reds	18–10	Brumbies
Pen: James Tuttle 10', 25', 58'; Jono Lance 66', 72', 80'; Cards: Caleb Timu (yellow card) 35' to 45'	Report; Scoreboard	Try: Joe Powell 30'; Isi Naisarani 75'

Suncorp Stadium, Brisbane
Attendance: 11,034
Referee: Angus Gardner

3 March 2018
13:15

Sunwolves	17–37	Rebels
Try: Will Tupou 35'; Ed Quirk 78'; Con: Ryoto Nakamura 37', 79'; Pen: Ryoto Nakamura 26'; Cards: Ed Quirk (yellow card) 80'	Report; Scoreboard	Try: Jack Maddocks 9', 48', 52'; Amanaki Mafi 12'; Sefa Naivalu 45' penalty try 80'; Con: Reece Hodge 50'; Pen: Jack Debreczeni 42'; Cards: Dane Haylett-Petty (yellow card) 76'

Prince Chichibu Memorial Stadium, Tokyo
Attendance: 11,181
Referee: Egon Seconds

3 March 2018
19:35

Crusaders	45–28	Stormers
Try: George Bridge 7', 40'; Codie Taylor 11'; Billy Harmon 17'; Bryn Hall 19'; Seta Tamanivalu 62'; Richie Mo'unga 69'; Con: Richie Mo'unga 12', 18', 20', 63', 70'; Cards: Billy Harmon (yellow card) 80'	Report; Scoreboard	Try: JC Janse van Rensburg 33'; Wilco Louw 41'; JD Schickerling 54'; Steven Kitshoff 76'; Con: SP Marais 34', 43', 55'; George Whitehead 77'

AMI Stadium, Christchurch
Referee: Nic Berry

3 March 2018
15:05

Sharks	24–24	Waratahs
Try: Lukhanyo Am 18', 46'; Robert du Preez 71'; Con: Robert du Preez 19', 47', 72'; Pen: Robert du Preez 12'	Report; Scoreboard	Try: Jake Gordon 4'; Michael Hooper 56'; Mitch Short 76'; Con: Bernard Foley 6', 57', 78'; Pen: Bernard Foley 31'

Kings Park Stadium, Durban
Attendance: 14,143
Referee: Jaco Peyper

3 March 2018
17:15

Bulls	35–49	Lions
Try: Johnny Kôtze 35'; Handré Pollard 41'; Lizo Gqoboka 76'; Travis Ismaiel 78'; Con: Marnitz Boshoff 42'; Francois Brummer 77', 79'; Pen: Marnitz Boshoff 6', 23', 28'; Cards: Conraad van Vuuren (yellow card) 54' to 64'; Nick de Jager (yellow card) 55' to 65'	Report; Scoreboard	Try: Ruan Dreyer 14'; Jacques van Rooyen 18'; Marvin Orie 32'; Malcolm Marx 51' penalty try 55'; Sylvian Mahuza 56'; Ross Cronjé 71'; Con: Elton Jantjies 15', 19', 33', 52', 57', 72'

Loftus Versfeld, Pretoria
Attendance: 20,789
Referee: Marius van der Westhuizen

3 March 2018
18:40

Jaguares	9–34	Hurricanes
Pen: Nicolás Sánchez 17', 40', 47'	Report; Scoreboard	Try: Ben Lam 9'; Ngani Laumape 26'; Matt Proctor 53'; Vince Aso 64'; Blade Thomson 79'; Con: Beauden Barrett 10', 55', 66'; Pen: Jackson Garden-Bachop 79'; Cards: Ben May (yellow card) 57' to 67'

José Amalfitani Stadium, Buenos Aires
Attendance: 7,025
Referee: Nick Briant

Bye/s: Highlanders

== Round 4 ==
9 March 2018
19:35

Highlanders	33–15	Stormers
Try: Liam Squire 4'; Aaron Smith 20', 78'; Waisake Naholo 33'; Luke Whitelock 48'; Con: Lima Sopoaga 21', 34', 49', 80'	Report; Scoreboard	Try: Chris van Zyl 11'; Damian Willemse 16'; Con: SP Marais 17'; Pen: SP Marais 32'

Forsyth Barr Stadium, Dunedin
Attendance: 12,900
Referee: Glen Jackson

9 March 2018
19:45

Rebels	33–10	Brumbies
Try: Amanaki Mafi 29'; Reece Hodge 33', 64'; Jack Maddocks 67'; Michael Ruru 71'; Con: Reece Hodge 30', 34', 66', 68'; Cards: Jordan Uelese (yellow card) 9' to 19'	Report; Scoreboard	Try: Chance Peni 9'; Henry Speight 55'; Cards: Leslie Leulua’iali’i-Makin (yellow card) 62' to 72'

AAMI Park, Melbourne
Attendance: 10,061
Referee: Will Houston

10 March 2018
19:35

Hurricanes	29–19	Crusaders
Try: Chris Eves 5'; TJ Perenara 13'; Ben Lam 22'; Matt Proctor 32'; Con: Beauden Barrett 5', 15', 24'; Pen: Jordie Barrett 67'	Report; Scoreboard	Try: Manasa Mataele 30'; Jordan Taufua 37'; Michael Alaalatoa 55'; Con: Mitchell Hunt 38', 56'

Westpac Stadium, Wellington
Attendance: 20,306
Referee: Brendon Pickerill

10 March 2018
18:45

Reds	20–14	Bulls
Try: Caleb Timu 36'; Aidan Toua 46'; Con: James Tuttle 38', 47'; Pen: James Tuttle 24'; Jono Lance 76'	Report; Scoreboard	Try: Warrick Gelant 5'; André Warner 25'; Con: Handré Pollard 6', 26'

Suncorp Stadium, Brisbane
Attendance: 11,827
Referee: Jamie Nutbrown

10 March 2018
15:05

Sharks	50–22	Sunwolves
Try: Makazole Mapimpi 9', 49'; Akker van der Merwe 29'; Tera Mtembu 36'; Jacques Vermeulen 55'; S'busiso Nkosi 68'; Cameron Wright 75'; Con: Robert du Preez 10', 30', 37', 56', 69'; Curwin Bosch 76'; Pen: Robert du Preez 2'	Report; Scoreboard	Try: Lomano Lemeki 45'; Wimpie van der Walt 59'; Will Tupou 78'; Con: Kotaro Matsushima 61'; Ryoto Nakamura 79'; Pen: Harumichi Tatekawa 25'

Kings Park Stadium, Durban
Referee: Federico Anselmi

10 March 2018
17:15

Lions	35–38	Blues
Try: Sylvian Mahuza 2'; Rohan Janse van Rensburg 15'; Elton Jantjies 37'; Aphiwe Dyantyi 55'; Dylan Smith 73'; Con: Elton Jantjies 4', 17', 39', 56', 74'	Report; Scoreboard	Try: Akira Ioane 39'; Rieko Ioane 63', 69'; Jimmy Tupou 75'; Murphy Taramai 80'; Con: Bryn Gatland 40'; Stephen Perofeta 64', 70', 76', 80'; Pen: Bryn Gatland 22'

Emirates Airline Park, Johannesburg
Attendance: 14,032
Referee: Nic Berry

10 March 2018
18:40

Jaguares	38–28	Waratahs
Try: Emiliano Boffelli 1', 11'; Joaquín Tuculet 16'; Nicolás Sánchez 19'; Bautista Delguy 40'; Matías Orlando 73'; Con: Nicolás Sánchez 2', 12', 17', 40'	Report; Scoreboard	Try: Jed Holloway 35'; Curtis Rona 47'; Nick Palmer 80'; Israel Folau 80'; Con: Bernard Foley 36', 48', 80', 80'

José Amalfitani Stadium, Buenos Aires
Attendance: 5,203
Referee: Mike Fraser

Bye/s: Chiefs

== Round 5 ==
16 March 2018
19:35

Chiefs	41–28	Bulls
Try: Johnny Fa'auli 9'; Brodie Retallick 36', 56'; Mitchell Brown 43'; Solomon Alaimalo 74'; Anton Lienert-Brown 80'; Con: Damian McKenzie 10', 38', 45', 80'; Pen: Damian McKenzie 63'	Report; Scoreboard	Try: Warrick Gelant 3'; Divan Rossouw 16', 23'; Handré Pollard 38'; Con: Handré Pollard 5', 16', 24', 40'; Cards: Conraad van Vuuren (yellow card) 68' to 78'

FMG Stadium Waikato, Hamilton
Attendance: 12,451
Referee: Shuhei Kubo

17 March 2018
19:35

Highlanders	25–17	Crusaders
Try: Liam Coltman 10'; Lima Sopoaga 15'; Elliot Dixon 50'; Con: Lima Sopoaga 11', 15'; Pen: Lima Sopoaga 66', 70'; Cards: Waisake Naholo (yellow card) 42' to 52'	Report; Scoreboard	Try: George Bridge 6'; Bryn Hall 55'; Con: Mitchell Hunt 8', 56'; Pen: Mitchell Hunt 20'

Forsyth Barr Stadium, Dunedin
Referee: Nick Briant

17 March 2018
19:45

Brumbies	24–17	Sharks
Try: Lausii Taliauli 18'; Henry Speight 47'; Con: Wharenui Hawera 19'; Pen: Wharenui Hawera 7', 62', 65', 72'; Cards: Lachlan McCaffrey (yellow card) 36' to 46'; Allan Alaalatoa (yellow card) 53' to 63'	Report; Scoreboard	Try: Thomas du Toit 57'; Curwin Bosch 77'; Con: Robert du Preez 58', 78'; Pen: Robert du Preez 31'

GIO Stadium, Canberra
Attendance: 8,122
Referee: Glen Jackson

17 March 2018
15:05

Stormers	37–20	Blues
Try: EW Viljoen 2', 50'; Raymond Rhule 13'; Dewaldt Duvenage 36'; Con: Damian Willemse 3', 15', 36', 51'; Pen: Damian Willemse 30', 65', 72'	Report; Scoreboard	Try: Akira Ioane 46'; Michael Collins 57'; Rieko Ioane 69'; Con: Stephen Perofeta 58'; Pen: Bryn Gatland 17'

DHL Newlands, Cape Town
Referee: Nic Berry

17 March 2018
17:15

Lions	40–38	Sunwolves
Try: Andries Coetzee 8'; Marvin Orie 19'; Malcolm Marx 27', 62'; Aphiwe Dyantyi 41'; Rohan Janse van Rensburg 72'; Con: Elton Jantjies 10', 20', 42', 63', 72'	Report; Scoreboard	Try: Kotaro Matsushima 22'; Craig Millar 31'; Hosea Saumaki 51'; Kazuki Himeno 59'; Atsushi Sakate 80'; Con: Will Tupou 23', 32', 52'; Ryoto Nakamura 60', 80'; Pen: Will Tupou 2'

Emirates Airline Park, Johannesburg
Attendance: 7,764
Referee: Rasta Rasivhenge

17 March 2018
18:40

Jaguares	7–18	Reds
Try: Bautista Delguy 7'; Con: Nicolás Sánchez 8'	Report; Scoreboard	Try: Brandon Paenga-Amosa 28'; Filipo Daugunu 47'; Con: James Tuttle 49'; Pen: James Tuttle 4', 36'

José Amalfitani Stadium, Buenos Aires
Referee: Paul Williams

18 March 2018
16:05

Waratahs	51–27	Rebels
Try: Lalakai Foketi 39'; Rob Simmons 43'; Mitch Short 49'; Bryce Hegarty 55'; Taqele Naiyaravoro 58', 79'; Con: Bernard Foley 40', 44', 50', 57', 60', 80'; Pen: Bernard Foley 16', 53', 73'	Report; Scoreboard	Try: Tom English 5'; Amanaki Mafi 27'; Jack Maddocks 37'; Matt Philip 63'; Con: Reece Hodge 29', 64'; Pen: Reece Hodge 23'

Allianz Stadium, Sydney
Attendance: 11,652
Referee: Brendon Pickerill

Bye/s: Hurricanes

== Round 6 ==
23 March 2018
19:35

Crusaders	33–14	Bulls
Try: Scott Barrett 15'; Codie Taylor 28'; Jack Goodhue 39', 49'; George Bridge 73'; Con: Mitchell Hunt 16', 29', 40', 49'; Cards: Tim Perry (yellow card) 26' to 36'	Report; Scoreboard	Try: Travis Ismaiel 31'; Marco van Staden 69'; Con: Handré Pollard 33', 69'

AMI Stadium, Christchurch
Referee: Federico Anselmi

23 March 2018
19:45

Rebels	46–14	Sharks
Try: Anaru Rangi 11'; Amanaki Mafi 38'; Will Genia 56'; Bill Meakes 64'; Ross Haylett-Petty 68'; Fereti Sa'aga 80'; Con: Reece Hodge 12'; Jack Debreczeni 57', 64', 69', 80'; Pen: Reece Hodge 2'; Jack Debreczeni 45'; Cards: Jack Maddocks (yellow card) 72'	Report; Scoreboard	Try: Lwazi Mvovo 28'; Marius Louw 78'; Con: Robert du Preez 30'; Curwin Bosch 78'; Cards: Curwin Bosch (yellow card) 18' to 28'

AAMI Park, Melbourne
Attendance: 8,393
Referee: Shuhei Kubo

24 March 2018
13:15

Sunwolves	10–61	Chiefs
Try: Semisi Masirewa 36'; Hosea Saumaki 42'	Report; Scoreboard	Try: Tyler Ardron 4'; Brodie Retallick 12'; Nathan Harris 17'; Solomon Alaimalo 20', 53'; Damian McKenzie 45', 65'; Liam Polwart 74'; Sean Wainui 78'; Con: Damian McKenzie 6', 14', 18', 21', 54', 67', 75', 79'

Prince Chichibu Memorial Stadium, Tokyo
Attendance: 13,464
Referee: Will Houston

24 March 2018
19:35

Hurricanes	29–12	Highlanders
Try: Beauden Barrett 6'; Ben Lam 38', 73'; Vince Aso 65'; Con: Beauden Barrett 7', 66', 75'; Pen: Jordie Barrett 49'	Report; Scoreboard	Try: Waisake Naholo 20', 43'; Con: Lima Sopoaga 44'

Westpac Stadium, Wellington
Attendance: 15,075
Referee: Mike Fraser

24 March 2018
17:15

Stormers	25–19	Reds
Try: Dewaldt Duvenage 15'; Wilco Louw 26'; Raymond Rhule 53'; Con: Damian Willemse 27', 55'; Pen: Damian Willemse 3', 32'	Report; Scoreboard	Try: Caleb Timu 37'; Alex Mafi 42'; Filipo Daugunu 80'; Con: Jono Lance 38', 42'

DHL Newlands, Cape Town
Referee: Marius van der Westhuizen

24 March 2018
16:40

Jaguares	49–35	Lions
Try: Bautista Delguy 1'; Emiliano Boffelli 28', 47'; Javier Ortega Desio 40', 72'; Bautista Ezcurra 65'; Con: Nicolás Sánchez 2', 40', 48', 66', 73'; Pen: Nicolás Sánchez 11', 37', 75'	Report; Scoreboard	Try: Marvin Orie 17'; Sylvian Mahuza 22'; Malcolm Marx 56', 67'; Lourens Erasmus 62'; Con: Elton Jantjies 18', 23', 58', 63', 68'

José Amalfitani Stadium, Buenos Aires
Referee: Jamie Nutbrown

Bye/s: Blues, Brumbies, Waratahs

== Round 7 ==
30 March 2018
19:35

Chiefs	27–22	Highlanders
Try: Solomon Alaimalo 39'; Nathan Harris 44'; Sean Wainui 68'; Con: Damian McKenzie 40', 45', 70'; Pen: Damian McKenzie 11', 20'	Report; Scoreboard	Try: Waisake Naholo 23'; Tevita Li 51'; Sio Tomkinson 63'; Con: Fletcher Smith 25', 64'; Pen: Fletcher Smith 59'

FMG Stadium Waikato, Hamilton
Referee: Glen Jackson

30 March 2018
19:45

Rebels	19–50	Hurricanes
Try: Matt Philip 30'; Con: Jack Debreczeni 30'; Pen: Jack Debreczeni 5', 15', 22', 26'; Cards: Bill Meakes (yellow card) 66' to 76'	Report; Scoreboard	Try: Ben Lam 11', 34', 70', 80'; Beauden Barrett 40'; Gareth Evans 49'; Ngani Laumape 61'; Con: Beauden Barrett 35', 40', 63'; Pen: Beauden Barrett 3', 34', 45'

AAMI Park, Melbourne
Attendance: 16,135
Referee: Angus Gardner

31 March 2018
19:35

Blues	40–63	Sharks
Try: Michael Collins 22'; Akira Ioane 45'; Patrick Tuipulotu 51'; Stephen Perofeta 53'; Rieko Ioane 75'; George Moala 80'; Con: Stephen Perofeta 23', 46', 52', 53'; Bryn Gatland 76'; Cards: Jordan Trainor (yellow card) 65' to 75'	Report; Scoreboard	Try: Ruan Botha 11'; Jean-Luc du Preez 34'; Tera Mtembu 57'; Robert du Preez 60'; Kobus van Wyk 72'; Curwin Bosch 80'; Con: Robert du Preez 11', 34', 58', 61', 72', 80'; Pen: Robert du Preez 4', 16', 26', 39', 64', 70', 78'; Cards: S'busiso Nkosi (yellow card) 44' to 54'

Eden Park, Auckland
Attendance: 10,450
Referee: Nick Briant

31 March 2018
19:45

Brumbies	17–24	Waratahs
Try: Lausii Taliauli 26'; Pen: Wharenui Hawera 10', 20', 49', 71'	Report; Scoreboard	Try: Taqele Naiyaravoro 40', 43'; Con: Bernard Foley 40'; Pen: Bernard Foley 5', 25', 65', 77'

GIO Stadium, Canberra
Attendance: 13,515
Referee: Paul Williams

31 March 2018
17:15

Bulls	33–23	Stormers
Try: Adriaan Strauss 6', 17', 46'; Johnny Kôtze 31'; Jesse Kriel 70'; Con: Handré Pollard 8', 32', 47', 70'; Cards: Lizo Gqoboka (yellow card) 80'	Report; Scoreboard	Try: Jan de Klerk 37'; Damian de Allende 40'; Siya Kolisi 66'; Con: Damian Willemse 40'; Pen: Damian Willemse 15', 24'; Cards: Damian de Allende (yellow card) 16' to 26'; Pieter-Steph du Toit (yellow card) 42' to 52'

Loftus Versfeld, Pretoria
Attendance: 23,245
Referee: Marius van der Westhuizen

1 April 2018
14:30

Lions	8–14	Crusaders
Try: Madosh Tambwe 14'; Pen: Elton Jantjies 77'	Report; Scoreboard	Try: Sam Whitelock 50'; Jack Goodhue 53'; Con: Mitchell Hunt 51', 54'

Emirates Airline Park, Johannesburg
Attendance: 15,002
Referee: Jaco Peyper

Bye/s: Jaguares, Reds, Sunwolves

== Round 8 ==
6 April 2018
19:35

Hurricanes	38–37	Sharks
Try: Jordie Barrett 8'; Ngani Laumape 16', 80'; Vince Aso 31'; Con: Ihaia West 18', 32', 80'; Pen: Ihaia West 45', 51', 72', 78'	Report; Scoreboard	Try: Lukhanyo Am 21', 36'; Louis Schreuder 25'; Tyler Paul 73'; Con: Robert du Preez 22', 26', 37', 75'; Pen: Robert du Preez 5', 34', 55'; Cards: Franco Marais (yellow card) 80'

McLean Park, Napier
Attendance: 12,902
Referee: Nic Berry

7 April 2018
14:15

Sunwolves	29–50	Waratahs
Try: Michael Little 11'; Sam Wykes 23'; Semisi Masirewa 53'; Kazuki Himeno 66'; Con: Yu Tamura 12', 25'; Hayden Parker 67'; Pen: Yu Tamura 28'	Report; Scoreboard	Try: Jake Gordon 6', 35'; Curtis Rona 16'; Will Miller 19'; Bryce Hegarty 40'; Michael Hooper 45'; Taqele Naiyaravoro 72'; Con: Bernard Foley 7', 17', 21', 36', 40', 74'; Pen: Bernard Foley 14'; Cards: Michael Hooper (yellow card) 65' to 75'

Prince Chichibu Memorial Stadium, Tokyo
Attendance: 9,707
Referee: Angus Gardner

7 April 2018
19:35

Chiefs	21–19	Blues
Try: Sean Wainui 12' penalty try 74'; Pen: Damian McKenzie 9', 19', 31'	Report; Scoreboard	Try: James Parsons 36'; Con: Stephen Perofeta 37'; Pen: Stephen Perofeta 2', 5', 29', 40'; Cards: Josh Goodhue (yellow card) 68' to 78'

FMG Stadium Waikato, Hamilton
Referee: Paul Williams

7 April 2018
19:45

Brumbies	45–21	Reds
Try: Folau Fainga'a 27'; Isi Naisarani 33', 71'; Chance Peni 47'; Rory Arnold 49'; Sam Carter 67'; David Pocock 76'; Con: Wharenui Hawera 28'; Christian Lealiifano 51', 68', 73', 77'	Report; Scoreboard	Try: Taniela Tupou 6'; Chris Feauai-Sautia 22'; Con: Jono Lance 7'; Pen: Jono Lance 18', 31'; James Tuttle 61'; Cards: Chris Feauai-Sautia (yellow card) 39' to 49'

GIO Stadium, Canberra
Attendance: 7,598
Referee: Ben O'Keeffe

7 April 2018
17:15

Lions	52–31	Stormers
Try: Madosh Tambwe 1', 9', 13', 52'; Lionel Mapoe 26'; Kwagga Smith 40'; Franco Mostert 46'; Ruan Combrinck 62'; Con: Elton Jantjies 2', 14', 40', 47', 53', 63'; Cards: Marvin Orie (yellow card) 77'	Report; Scoreboard	Try: Wilco Louw 21'; Damian Willemse 59'; Paul de Wet 73' penalty try 80'; Con: SP Marais 22', 60'; Damian Willemse 73'; Pen: SP Marais 36'

Emirates Airline Park, Johannesburg
Attendance: 22,308
Referee: Jaco Peyper

7 April 2018
18:40

Jaguares	14–40	Crusaders
Try: Joaquín Tuculet 44'; Emiliano Boffelli 52'; Con: Nicolás Sánchez 45', 53'	Report; Scoreboard	Try: George Bridge 6', 14'; Manasa Mataele 33', 69'; Mitchell Hunt 49'; Ryan Crotty 67'; Con: Mitchell Hunt 15', 33', 50', 68'; Mike Delany 70'

José Amalfitani Stadium, Buenos Aires
Referee: Marius van der Westhuizen

Bye/s: Bulls, Highlanders, Rebels

== Round 9 ==
13 April 2018
19:35

Hurricanes	25–13	Chiefs
Try: Ben Lam 7'; Beauden Barrett 42'; Ngani Laumape 46'; Con: Jordie Barrett 8', 43'; Pen: Jordie Barrett 15', 80'	Report; Scoreboard	Try: Lachlan Boshier 59'; Con: Damian McKenzie 60'; Pen: Damian McKenzie 11', 40'

Westpac Stadium, Wellington
Attendance: 19,212
Referee: Jamie Nutbrown

14 April 2018
12:05

Sunwolves	10–24	Blues
Try: Timothy Lafaele 21'; Con: Hayden Parker 23'; Pen: Yu Tamura 4'	Report; Scoreboard	Try: Jordan Hyland 28', 76'; Akira Ioane 50'; Dalton Papalii 55'; Con: Stephen Perofeta 51', 56'; Cards: Patrick Tuipulotu (yellow card) 3' to 13'

Prince Chichibu Memorial Stadium, Tokyo
Attendance: 9,562
Referee: Nick Briant

14 April 2018
15:15

Rebels	22–25	Jaguares
Try: Bill Meakes 10'; Marika Koroibete 18'; Dane Haylett-Petty 49'; Con: Jack Debreczeni 11', 20'; Pen: Jack Debreczeni 65'; Cards: Tetera Faulkner (yellow card) 56' to 66'	Report; Scoreboard	Try: Sebastián Cancelliere 51'; Ramiro Moyano 57'; Bautista Ezcurra 74'; Con: Nicolás Sánchez 51', 76'; Pen: Nicolás Sánchez 8', 45'

AAMI Park, Melbourne
Attendance: 5,538
Referee: Nic Berry

14 April 2018
19:35

Highlanders	43–17	Brumbies
Try: Lima Sopoaga 7'; Ben Smith 25', 68'; Waisake Naholo 60'; Shannon Frizell 70'; Fletcher Smith 80'; Con: Lima Sopoaga 26', 69', 71', 80'; Ben Smith 61'; Pen: Lima Sopoaga 48'; Cards: Lima Sopoaga (yellow card) 52' to 62'	Report; Scoreboard	Try: Isi Naisarani 34'; Joe Powell 74'; Con: Wharenui Hawera 35', 75'; Pen: Wharenui Hawera 16'

Forsyth Barr Stadium, Dunedin
Referee: Mike Fraser

14 April 2018
19:45

Waratahs	37–16	Reds
Try: Jake Gordon 36'; Taqele Naiyaravoro 48', 72'; Harry Johnson-Holmes 80'; Con: Bernard Foley 37', 50', 72', 80'; Pen: Bernard Foley 3', 18', 55'	Report; Scoreboard	Try: Filipo Daugunu 59'; Con: Jono Lance 60'; Pen: James Tuttle 25', 40', 45'

Sydney Cricket Ground, Sydney
Attendance: 15,648
Referee: Angus Gardner

14 April 2018
17:15

Sharks	10–40	Bulls
Try: André Esterhuizen 39'; Con: Robert du Preez 40'; Pen: Robert du Preez 3'; Cards: Thomas du Toit (yellow card) 48' to 58'	Report; Scoreboard	Try: Warrick Gelant 5', 8', 78'; Adriaan Strauss 25' penalty try 47'; Johnny Kôtze 80'; Con: Handré Pollard 6', 10', 26'; Manie Libbok 79'

Kings Park Stadium, Durban
Referee: Egon Seconds

Bye/s: Crusaders, Lions, Stormers

== Round 10 ==
20 April 2018
19:35

Blues	16–34	Highlanders
Try: Jonathan Ruru 9'; Tumua Manu 70'; Pen: Bryn Gatland 14', 22'	Report; Scoreboard	Try: Dillon Hunt 1'; Shannon Frizell 5', 34', 57'; Kayne Hammington 44'; Con: Lima Sopoaga 6', 45', 58'; Pen: Lima Sopoaga 39'

Eden Park, Auckland
Attendance: 11,200
Referee: Marius van der Westhuizen

20 April 2018
19:45

Waratahs	0–29	Lions
	Report; Scoreboard	Try: Madosh Tambwe 22'; Kwagga Smith 44'; Harold Vorster 50'; Marnus Schoeman 77'; Con: Elton Jantjies 23', 51', 78'; Pen: Elton Jantjies 71'

Allianz Stadium, Sydney
Attendance: 10,614
Referee: Mike Fraser

21 April 2018
19:35

Crusaders	33–11	Sunwolves
Try: Ryan Crotty 1', 57'; Matt Todd 9'; Manasa Mataele 62'; Jack Stratton 80'; Con: Mike Delany 3', 10', 58'; Mitchell Hunt 80'	Report; Scoreboard	Try: Michael Little 12'; Pen: Hayden Parker 43', 51'

AMI Stadium, Christchurch
Referee: Brendon Pickerill

21 April 2018
19:45

Reds	12–36	Chiefs
Try: Samu Kerevi 48', 75'; Con: Jono Lance 49'	Report; Scoreboard	Try: Tyler Ardron 13'; Charlie Ngatai 17'; Brodie Retallick 29'; Liam Polwart 43'; Samisoni Taukei'aho 80'; Con: Damian McKenzie 14', 18'; Marty McKenzie 30', 44'; Pen: Damian McKenzie 7'

Suncorp Stadium, Brisbane
Attendance: 14,002
Referee: Jaco Peyper

21 April 2018
15:05

Bulls	28–10	Rebels
Try: Adriaan Strauss 6'; Jesse Kriel 23'; Divan Rossouw 40'; André Warner 72'; Con: Handré Pollard 7', 24', 40', 74'	Report; Scoreboard	Try: Michael Ruru 46'; Con: Jack Debreczeni 47'; Pen: Jack Debreczeni 20'

Loftus Versfeld, Pretoria
Referee: Ben O'Keeffe

21 April 2018
17:15

Sharks	24–17	Stormers
Try: Lukhanyo Am 42'; Jean-Luc du Preez 64'; Thomas du Toit 73'; Con: Robert du Preez 43', 65', 74'; Pen: Robert du Preez 19'	Report; Scoreboard	Try: Raymond Rhule 39'; Ramone Samuels 52'; Con: Damian Willemse 40', 53'; Pen: Damian Willemse 50'; Cards: Dewaldt Duvenage (yellow card) 59' to 69'

Kings Park Stadium, Durban
Referee: Glen Jackson

22 April 2018
16:05

Brumbies	20–25	Jaguares
Try: Tom Banks 35', 40'; Chance Peni 66'; Con: Wharenui Hawera 67'; Pen: Wharenui Hawera 80'	Report; Scoreboard	Try: Matías Orlando 5'; Jerónimo de la Fuente 59'; Emiliano Boffelli 71'; Con: Nicolás Sánchez 6', 60'; Pen: Nicolás Sánchez 13', 16'; Cards: Emiliano Boffelli (yellow card) 48' to 58'

GIO Stadium, Canberra
Attendance: 8,053
Referee: Angus Gardner

Bye/s: Hurricanes

== Round 11 ==
27 April 2018
19:35

Hurricanes	43–15	Sunwolves
Try: Julian Savea 15'; Finlay Christie 28'; Reed Prinsep 39'; Jordie Barrett 42'; Vince Aso 74', 79'; Brad Shields 77'; Con: Beauden Barrett 16', 29', 40'; Jordie Barrett 78'	Report; Scoreboard	Try: Lappies Labuschagné 9'; Kenki Fukuoka 69'; Con: Hayden Parker 10'; Pen: Hayden Parker 18'

Westpac Stadium, Wellington
Attendance: 12,506
Referee: Jamie Nutbrown

27 April 2018
19:10

Stormers	34–18	Rebels
Try: Damian de Allende 16'; JJ Engelbrecht 33', 80'; Dillyn Leyds 44'; Con: Damian Willemse 17', 35', 46', 80'; Pen: Damian Willemse 11', 56'	Report; Scoreboard	Try: Sefa Naivalu 53', 76'; Con: Jack Debreczeni 54'; Pen: Jack Debreczeni 6', 13'

DHL Newlands, Cape Town
Referee: Ben O'Keeffe

28 April 2018
15:05

Reds	27–22	Lions
Try: JP Smith 2'; Caleb Timu 11'; Brandon Paenga-Amosa 27'; George Smith 40'; Con: Filipo Daugunu 28', 40'; Pen: Filipo Daugunu 48'	Report; Scoreboard	Try: Malcolm Marx 55', 61'; Marnus Schoeman 79', 80'; Con: Elton Jantjies 62'

Suncorp Stadium
Attendance: 12,369
Referee: Angus Gardner

28 April 2018
19:35

Blues	13–20	Jaguares
Try: Tumua Manu 17'; Matt Duffie 28'; Pen: Stephen Perofeta 36'; Cards: Akira Ioane (yellow card) 13' to 23'	Report; Scoreboard	Try: Agustín Creevy 14'; Emiliano Boffelli 54'; Tomás Lezana 62'; Con: Nicolás Sánchez 63'; Pen: Nicolás Sánchez 67'

Eden Park, Auckland
Attendance: 5,000
Referee: Paul Williams

28 April 2018
19:45

Brumbies	8–21	Crusaders
Try: Henry Speight 2'; Pen: Wharenui Hawera 36'; Cards: Chance Peni (yellow card) 20' to 30'	Report; Scoreboard	Try: Tim Bateman 17'; Manasa Mataele 26', 31'; Con: Mike Delany 18', 27', 32'; Cards: Scott Barrett (yellow card) 59' to 69'; Ryan Crotty (yellow card) 62' to 72'

GIO Stadium, Canberra
Attendance: 8,215
Referee: Jaco Peyper

28 April 2018
17:15

Bulls	28–29	Highlanders
Try: penalty try 21'; Handré Pollard 30'; Jason Jenkins 57'; Jesse Kriel 75'; Con: Handré Pollard 31', 58', 76'	Report; Scoreboard	Try: Aaron Smith 3'; Fletcher Smith 43'; Con: Lima Sopoaga 5', 44'; Pen: Lima Sopoaga 34', 43', 53', 63', 80'; Cards: Fletcher Smith (yellow card) 23' to 33'

Loftus Versfeld, Pretoria
Referee: Glen Jackson

Bye/s: Chiefs, Sharks, Waratahs

== Round 12 ==
4 May 2018
19:35

Chiefs	19–23	Jaguares
Try: Jesse Parete 80'; Con: Damian McKenzie 80'; Pen: Damian McKenzie 8', 24', 39', 40'; Cards: Michael Allardice (yellow card) 50' to 60'; Liam Messam (yellow card) 51' to 61'	Report; Scoreboard	Try: Ramiro Moyano 26' penalty try 51'; Con: Nicolás Sánchez 28'; Pen: Emiliano Boffelli 20'; Nicolás Sánchez 43', 71'

Rotorua International Stadium, Rotorua
Referee: Mike Fraser

4 May 2018
19:45

Rebels	10–55	Crusaders
Try: Reece Hodge 33'; Con: Jack Debreczeni 33'; Pen: Jack Debreczeni 4'; Cards: Reece Hodge (yellow card) 15' to 25'	Report; Scoreboard	Try: Seta Tamanivalu 8'; Andrew Makalio 19', 45'; Jack Goodhue 52'; Pete Samu 64'; Bryn Hall 66'; Wyatt Crockett 78'; Manasa Mataele 80'; Con: Richie Mo'unga 46', 53'; Mitchell Hunt 65', 67', 79', 80'; Pen: Richie Mo'unga 40'; Cards: Matt Todd (yellow card) 23' to 33'; David Havili (yellow card) 34' to 44'

AAMI Park, Melbourne
Attendance: 11,357
Referee: Nick Briant

5 May 2018
19:35

Hurricanes	28–19	Lions
Try: Ben Lam 8', 45', 54'; Ardie Savea 25'; Con: Beauden Barrett 9', 27', 47', 56'	Report; Scoreboard	Try: Nic Groom 40'; Marnus Schoeman 57'; Sylvian Mahuza 75'; Con: Elton Jantjies 40', 76'

Westpac Stadium, Wellington
Attendance: 13,802
Referee: Nic Berry

5 May 2018
19:45

Waratahs	21–24	Blues
Try: Damien Fitzpatrick 25'; Sekope Kepu 33'; Michael Hooper 71'; Con: Bernard Foley 26', 35', 72'	Report; Scoreboard	Try: Rieko Ioane 7'; Tumua Manu 30'; Con: Stephen Perofeta 8'; Pen: Stephen Perofeta 18', 39', 62', 69'; Cards: Dalton Papalii (yellow card) 24' to 34'

Brookvale Oval, Sydney
Attendance: 13,013
Referee: Jaco Peyper

5 May 2018
15:05

Stormers	29–17	Bulls
Try: Damian Willemse 5'; Wilco Louw 11'; SP Marais 50'; Ramone Samuels 62'; Con: Damian Willemse 7', 51', 63'; Pen: SP Marais 53'; Cards: Ramone Samuels (yellow card) 33' to 43'	Report; Scoreboard	Try: Lood de Jager 20'; Jason Jenkins 48'; Con: Handré Pollard 21', 49'; Pen: Handré Pollard 34'

DHL Newlands, Cape Town
Referee: Glen Jackson

5 May 2018
17:15

Sharks	38–12	Highlanders
Try: Akker van der Merwe 1'; Makazole Mapimpi 7'; Dan du Preez 45'; S'busiso Nkosi 62'; Robert du Preez 68'; Con: Robert du Preez 2', 9', 46', 63', 68'; Pen: Robert du Preez 33'	Report; Scoreboard	Try: Dillon Hunt 27'; Teihorangi Walden 74'; Con: Lima Sopoaga 29'

Kings Park Stadium, Durban
Referee: Marius van der Westhuizen

Bye/s: Brumbies, Reds, Sunwolves

== Round 13 ==
11 May 2018
19:35

Blues	15–36	Hurricanes
Try: Orbyn Leger 26'; Ofa Tu'ungafasi 49'; Con: Stephen Perofeta 50'; Pen: Stephen Perofeta 15'	Report; Scoreboard	Try: Ricky Riccitelli 6'; Gareth Evans 32'; Nehe Milner-Skudder 53'; Sam Lousi 61'; Matt Proctor 79'; Con: Beauden Barrett 7', 33', 55', 62'; Pen: Beauden Barrett 71'

Eden Park, Auckland
Attendance: 12,200
Referee: Jaco Peyper

12 May 2018
12:05

Sunwolves	63–28	Reds
Try: Grant Hattingh 30'; Hayden Parker 33'; Hosea Saumaki 54', 78', 80' penalty try 69'; Con: Hayden Parker 30', 35', 55', 80', 80'; Pen: Hayden Parker 2', 7', 15', 28', 40', 43', 61'	Report; Scoreboard	Try: Brandon Paenga-Amosa 10'; Ben Lucas 21'; Angus Scott-Young 66'; Filipo Daugunu 74'; Con: Jono Lance 11', 22', 67', 74'; Cards: Duncan Paia'aua (yellow card) 69' to 79'

Prince Chichibu Memorial Stadium, Tokyo
Attendance: 12,386
Referee: Egon Seconds

12 May 2018
17:15

Crusaders	31–29	Waratahs
Try: Joe Moody 35'; Codie Taylor 39'; Seta Tamanivalu 40'; Braydon Ennor 56' penalty try 68'; Con: Richie Mo'unga 36', 40'	Report; Scoreboard	Try: Cameron Clark 4'; Taqele Naiyaravoro 17'; Israel Folau 23'; Curtis Rona 28'; Con: Bernard Foley 18', 24', 29'; Pen: Bernard Foley 13'; Cards: Nick Phipps (yellow card) 40' to 50'; Taqele Naiyaravoro (yellow card) 53' to 63'

AMI Stadium, Christchurch
Attendance: 11,597
Referee: Ben O'Keeffe

12 May 2018
19:35

Highlanders	39–27	Lions
Try: Lima Sopoaga 4'; Liam Coltman 14'; Luke Whitelock 34'; Waisake Naholo 44'; Teihorangi Walden 64'; Con: Lima Sopoaga 6', 15', 45', 65'; Pen: Lima Sopoaga 77', 80'	Report; Scoreboard	Try: Harold Vorster 39'; Robbie Coetzee 40', 49'; Marnus Schoeman 73'; Con: Elton Jantjies 40', 73'; Pen: Elton Jantjies 10'

Forsyth Barr Stadium, Dunedin
Attendance: 13,170
Referee: Angus Gardner

12 May 2018
19:45

Brumbies	24–27	Rebels
Try: Tom Cusack 16'; Faalelei Sione 24'; Rob Valetini 31'; Con: Wharenui Hawera 17', 25', 32'; Pen: Wharenui Hawera 56'	Report; Scoreboard	Try: Tom English 7', 40'; Jack Maddocks 61'; Semisi Tupou 65'; Con: Reece Hodge 62', 66'; Pen: Reece Hodge 79'; Cards: Amanaki Mafi (yellow card) 22' to 32'

GIO Stadium, Canberra
Attendance: 5,283
Referee: Nic Berry

12 May 2018
15:05

Stormers	9–15	Chiefs
Pen: Damian Willemse 15', 54'; SP Marais 78'	Report; Scoreboard	Try: Anton Lienert-Brown 22' penalty try 67'; Pen: Damian McKenzie 75'

DHL Newlands, Cape Town
Referee: Mike Fraser

12 May 2018
17:15

Bulls	39–33	Sharks
Try: Warrick Gelant 11'; Jesse Kriel 15'; Roelof Smit 27'; Johnny Kôtze 54'; Lood de Jager 65'; Con: Handré Pollard 16', 27', 55', 67'; Pen: Handré Pollard 38', 69'; Cards: RG Snyman (yellow card) 34' to 44'	Report; Scoreboard	Try: Curwin Bosch 23'; Jacques Vermeulen 34'; Jean-Luc du Preez 70'; Con: Robert du Preez 23', 35', 71'; Pen: Curwin Bosch 40'; Robert du Preez 46', 52', 80'; Cards: Curwin Bosch (yellow card) 10' to 20'; Lukhanyo Am (yellow card) 69' to 79'

Loftus Versfeld, Pretoria
Referee: Rasta Rasivhenge

Bye/s: Jaguares

== Round 14 ==
18 May 2018
19:35

Hurricanes	38–34	Reds
Try: Beauden Barrett 7'; Ben Lam 14', 49'; Blade Thomson 36'; Sam Lousi 68'; Con: Beauden Barrett 8', 15', 37', 50', 69'; Pen: Beauden Barrett 40'	Report; Scoreboard	Try: Taniela Tupou 20'; Filipo Daugunu 26'; Jordan Petaia 53'; Samu Kerevi 74'; Con: Jono Lance 22', 27', 54', 75'; Pen: Jono Lance 3', 11'

Westpac Stadium, Wellington
Attendance: 15,991
Referee: Ben O'Keeffe

19 May 2018
13:15

Sunwolves	26–23	Stormers
Try: Hayden Parker 24'; Grant Hattingh 57'; Con: Hayden Parker 25', 58'; Pen: Hayden Parker 38', 65', 80'; Drop: Hayden Parker 80'	Report; Scoreboard	Try: Dillyn Leyds 6', 33'; JJ Engelbrecht 21'; Con: Jean-Luc du Plessis 22'; Pen: SP Marais 71', 74'

Mong Kok Stadium, Hong Kong
Attendance: 4,832
Referee: Nic Berry

19 May 2018
19:35

Blues	24–32	Crusaders
Try: Matt Duffie 7'; Rieko Ioane 38', 48'; Michael Collins 64'; Con: Stephen Perofeta 39', 50'	Report; Scoreboard	Try: George Bridge 3'; Quinten Strange 22'; Matt Todd 31'; Bryn Hall 40'; Con: Richie Mo'unga 5', 23', 40'; Pen: Richie Mo'unga 16', 54'; Cards: Quinten Strange (yellow card) 46' to 56'

Eden Park, Auckland
Attendance: 9,700
Referee: Glen Jackson

19 May 2018
19:45

Waratahs	41–12	Highlanders
Try: Taqele Naiyaravoro 15', 24'; Israel Folau 43', 55'; Lalakai Foketi 65'; Curtis Rona 68'; Con: Bernard Foley 25', 44', 56', 66'; Pen: Bernard Foley 7'	Report; Scoreboard	Try: Elliot Dixon 45'; Ash Dixon 58'; Con: Lima Sopoaga 47'; Cards: Tevita Nabura (red card) 19'; Aaron Smith (yellow card) 21' to 31'

Allianz Stadium, Sydney
Attendance: 12,308
Referee: Brendon Pickerill

19 May 2018
15:05

Sharks	28–24	Chiefs
Try: Robert du Preez 10'; Lwazi Mvovo 42'; Cameron Wright 58'; Con: Robert du Preez 11', 58'; Pen: Robert du Preez 5', 51', 67'	Report; Scoreboard	Try: Tyler Ardron 18'; Charlie Ngatai 47'; Solomon Alaimalo 80'; Con: Marty McKenzie 19', 48', 80'; Pen: Marty McKenzie 37'

Kings Park Stadium, Durban
Referee: Mike Fraser

19 May 2018
17:15

Lions	42–24	Brumbies
Try: Rohan Janse van Rensburg 9'; Robbie Coetzee 30'; Ruan Dreyer 40'; Marnus Schoeman 63'; Shaun Reynolds 74'; Lourens Erasmus 76'; Con: Elton Jantjies 11', 31', 40', 64', 74', 76'	Report; Scoreboard	Try: Tom Banks 2', 52'; Tevita Kuridrani 17'; Con: Christian Lealiifano 3', 17', 53'; Pen: Christian Lealiifano 37'; Cards: Rory Arnold (yellow card) 30' to 40' (red card) 61'; Sam Carter (yellow card) 62' to 72'

Emirates Airline Park, Johannesburg
Attendance: 14,469
Referee: Nick Briant

19 May 2018
18:40

Jaguares	54–24	Bulls
Try: Nicolás Sánchez 7'; Bautista Delguy 40', 55'; Marcos Kremer 48'; Matías Orlando 62'; Sebastián Cancelliere 74'; Emiliano Boffelli 80'; Con: Nicolás Sánchez 8', 40', 49', 56', 80'; Pen: Nicolás Sánchez 14', 18', 46'; Cards: Juan Cruz Mallia (yellow card) 77'	Report; Scoreboard	Try: Warrick Gelant 12'; Nick de Jager 70'; André Warner 78'; Con: Handré Pollard 13'; Manie Libbok 71', 79'; Pen: Handré Pollard 37'

José Amalfitani Stadium, Buenos Aires
Attendance: 11,352
Referee: Federico Anselmi

Bye/s: Rebels

== Round 15 ==
25 May 2018
19:35

Crusaders	24–13	Hurricanes
Try: Scott Barrett 24'; Michael Alaalatoa 52'; Heiden Bedwell-Curtis 65'; Con: Richie Mo'unga 25', 53', 66'; Pen: Richie Mo'unga 49'	Report; Scoreboard	Try: Reed Prinsep 72'; Con: Beauden Barrett 73'; Pen: Jordie Barrett 28'; Beauden Barrett 38'

AMI Stadium, Christchurch
Referee: Angus Gardner

25 May 2018
19:45

Rebels	40–13	Sunwolves
Try: Marika Koroibete 6', 68', 71'; Jack Maddocks 17', 48'; Amanaki Mafi 21'; Con: Reece Hodge 6', 17', 23', 49', 72'	Report; Scoreboard	Try: Lomano Lemeki 3'; Con: Hayden Parker 4'; Pen: Hayden Parker 32', 38'; Cards: Hosea Saumaki (yellow card) 63' to 73'

AAMI Park, Melbourne
Attendance: 7,853
Referee: Federico Anselmi

25 May 2018
16:40

Jaguares	29–13	Sharks
Try: Ramiro Moyano 29', 32', 80'; Bautista Delguy 71'; Con: Nicolás Sánchez 30', 34', 72'; Pen: Nicolás Sánchez 13'	Report; Scoreboard	Try: Ruan Botha 40'; Con: Robert du Preez 40'; Pen: Robert du Preez 50', 54'; Cards: Ruan Botha (red card) 74'

José Amalfitani Stadium, Buenos Aires
Attendance: 19,214
Referee: Paul Williams

26 May 2018
19:35

Chiefs	39–27	Waratahs
Try: Brodie Retallick 17'; Nathan Harris 29'; Damian McKenzie 33', 80'; Toni Pulu 49', 57'; Con: Damian McKenzie 18', 34', 80'; Pen: Damian McKenzie 74'	Report; Scoreboard	Try: Cameron Clark 5'; Curtis Rona 13'; Kurtley Beale 52'; Con: Bernard Foley 7', 14', 54'; Pen: Bernard Foley 46', 65'

FMG Stadium Waikato, Hamilton
Attendance: 10,747
Referee: Glen Jackson

26 May 2018
19:45

Reds	15–18	Highlanders
Try: Brandon Paenga-Amosa 39'; Hamish Stewart 45'; Con: Jono Lance 40'; Pen: Jono Lance 24'	Report; Scoreboard	Try: Tevita Li 27'; Liam Squire 58'; Con: Lima Sopoaga 58'; Pen: Lima Sopoaga 19', 78'

Suncorp Stadium, Brisbane
Attendance: 11,729
Referee: Rasta Rasivhenge

26 May 2018
15:05

Bulls	28–38	Brumbies
Try: Handré Pollard 5'; Roelof Smit 19'; Johnny Kôtze 50'; Con: Handré Pollard 6', 20'; Pen: Handré Pollard 47', 54', 64'	Report; Scoreboard	Try: Kyle Godwin 7'; Lachlan McCaffrey 43'; Folau Fainga'a 57'; Tom Banks 71'; Andy Muirhead 76'; Con: Christian Lealiifano 8', 44', 58'; Wharenui Hawera 73', 78'; Pen: Christian Lealiifano 17'; Cards: Folau Fainga'a (red card) 62'

Loftus Versfeld, Pretoria
Attendance: 8,189
Referee: Marius van der Westhuizen

26 May 2018
17:15

Stormers	23–26	Lions
Try: Dewaldt Duvenage 4'; Raymond Rhule 30'; Con: Jean-Luc du Plessis 5', 32'; Pen: Jean-Luc du Plessis 19', 67', 71'; Cards: JJ Engelbrecht (yellow card) 37' to 47'; Raymond Rhule (red card) 51'; Jaco Coetzee (yellow card) 60' to 70'	Report; Scoreboard	Try: Nic Groom 21'; Corné Fourie 54', 59'; Madosh Tambwe 76'; Con: Elton Jantjies 22', 61', 77'

DHL Newlands, Cape Town
Referee: Nick Briant

Bye/s: Blues

== Round 16 ==
Round 16 consisted of matches in the Australian and New Zealand Conferences only.

1 June 2018
19:35

Highlanders	30–14	Hurricanes
Try: Tevita Li 40'; Aaron Smith 44'; Tyrel Lomax 60'; Waisake Naholo 68'; Con: Lima Sopoaga 61', 70'; Pen: Lima Sopoaga 11', 73'; Cards: Liam Squire (yellow card) 38' to 48'	Report; Scoreboard	Try: Jordie Barrett 23'; Jeffery Toomaga-Allen 49'; Con: Beauden Barrett 24', 51'

Forsyth Barr Stadium, Dunedin
Referee: Ben O'Keeffe

2 June 2018
17:15

Blues	10–20	Rebels
Try: Terrence Hepetema 35'; Con: Stephen Perofeta 37'; Pen: Stephen Perofeta 6'	Report; Scoreboard	Try: Bill Meakes 12', 43'; Dane Haylett-Petty 39'; Con: Reece Hodge 13'; Pen: Reece Hodge 59'

Eden Park, Auckland
Attendance: 6,150
Referee: Nick Briant

2 June 2018
19:35

Chiefs	20–34	Crusaders
Try: Sean Wainui 20'; Luke Jacobson 23', 51'; Con: Damian McKenzie 51'; Pen: Damian McKenzie 11'	Report; Scoreboard	Try: Heiden Bedwell-Curtis 5'; Matt Todd 35'; George Bridge 45'; Luke Romano 77'; Con: Richie Mo'unga 6', 36', 47'; Mitchell Hunt 78'; Pen: Richie Mo'unga 18', 40'

FMG Stadium Waikato, Hamilton
Referee: Nic Berry

2 June 2018
19:45

Reds	41–52	Waratahs
Try: Izaia Perese 2'; Scott Higginbotham 14'; Taniela Tupou 32'; Alex Mafi 55'; Caleb Timu 59'; Jordan Petaia 72'; Sef Fa'agase 77'; Con: Hamish Stewart 3', 33'; Ben Lucas 77'; Cards: Kane Douglas (yellow card) 48' to 58'	Report; Scoreboard	Try: Curtis Rona 5'; Michael Wells 18'; Taqele Naiyaravoro 29'; Israel Folau 40', 51'; Nick Phipps 42'; Jake Gordon 63'; Cameron Clark 70'; Con: Bernard Foley 7', 20', 30', 40', 44', 64'

Suncorp Stadium, Brisbane
Attendance: 14,452
Referee: Angus Gardner

3 June 2018
16:05

Brumbies	41–31	Sunwolves
Try: David Pocock 7'; Lachlan McCaffrey 12'; Tom Banks 26'; Andy Muirhead 45'; Henry Speight 54', 74'; Tom Cusack 58'; Con: Christian Lealiifano 8', 28'; Wharenui Hawera 75'; Cards: Matt Lucas (yellow card) 80'	Report; Scoreboard	Try: Jason Emery 35'; Hencus van Wyk 42'; Ed Quirk 70'; Kai Ishii 80'; Con: Hayden Parker 36', 43', 71', 80'; Pen: Hayden Parker 24'

GIO Stadium, Canberra
Attendance: 9,521
Referee: Rasta Rasivhenge

== Round 17 ==
29 June 2018
19:35

Blues	39–16	Reds
Try: Melani Nanai 20'; Rieko Ioane 29'; Matt Moulds 31'; Stephen Perofeta 54'; Caleb Clarke 79'; Con: Stephen Perofeta 55'; Pen: Stephen Perofeta 12', 25', 46'; Cards: Matiaha Martin (yellow card) 62' to 72'; Sione Mafileo (yellow card) 68' to 78'	Report; Scoreboard	Try: Duncan Paia'aua 62'; Alex Mafi 72'; Pen: Jono Lance 3', 15'; Cards: Jordan Petaia (yellow card) 23' to 33'; Taniela Tupou (yellow card) 25' to 35'

Eden Park, Auckland
Attendance: 5,450
Referee: Egon Seconds

29 June 2018
19:45

Rebels	26–31	Waratahs
Try: Dane Haylett-Petty 36'; Michael Ruru 44'; Con: Reece Hodge 37', 45'; Pen: Reece Hodge 3', 47', 54', 59'; Cards: Bill Meakes (yellow card) 16' to 26'	Report; Scoreboard	Try: Taqele Naiyaravoro 18'; Will Miller 39'; Ned Hanigan 69'; Bernard Foley 72'; Con: Bernard Foley 20', 40', 70', 74'; Pen: Bernard Foley 32'

AAMI Park, Melbourne
Attendance: 9,208
Referee: Nic Berry

30 June 2018
19:35

Highlanders	22–45	Chiefs
Try: Teihorangi Walden 46', 53'; Aki Seiuli 64'; Shannon Frizell 78'; Con: Lima Sopoaga 47'; Cards: Luke Whitelock (yellow card) 34' to 44'	Report; Scoreboard	Try: Solomon Alaimalo 2'; Toni Pulu 10', 40'; Karl Tu’inukuafe 14'; Luke Jacobson 26'; Sean Wainui 35'; Con: Damian McKenzie 3', 12', 15', 27', 36', 40'; Pen: Damian McKenzie 72'; Cards: Michael Allardice (yellow card) 74'

ANZ Stadium, Suva, Fiji
Referee: Paul Williams

30 June 2018
19:45

Brumbies	24–12	Hurricanes
Try: Kyle Godwin 9'; Folau Fainga'a 42'; Rory Arnold 53'; Andy Muirhead 77'; Con: Christian Lealiifano 43'; Matt Lucas 78'	Report; Scoreboard	Try: TJ Perenara 4'; Julian Savea 14'; Con: Jordie Barrett 5'; Cards: Blade Thomson (yellow card) 55' to 65'

GIO Stadium, Canberra
Attendance: 6,821
Referee: Nick Briant

30 June 2018
19:55

Sunwolves	42–37	Bulls
Try: Hayden Parker 2'; Keisuke Uchida 19'; Gerhard van den Heever 46'; Willie Britz 52'; Michael Little 65'; Rahboni Warren-Vosayaco 75'; Con: Hayden Parker 4', 20', 47', 53', 66', 76'; Cards: Willie Britz (yellow card) 38' to 48'	Report; Scoreboard	Try: Jesse Kriel 23', 28'; Handré Pollard 40'; Conraad van Vuuren 49'; Con: Handré Pollard 24', 28', 40', 50'; Pen: Handré Pollard 42', 60', 71'

National Stadium, Singapore
Attendance: 4,862
Referee: Ben O'Keeffe

30 June 2018
17:15

Sharks	31–24	Lions
Try: Dan du Preez 3'; André Esterhuizen 59'; Lwazi Mvovo 68'; Con: Robert du Preez 59', 70'; Pen: Robert du Preez 13', 39', 63', 73'	Report; Scoreboard	Try: Ruan Combrinck 8'; Cyle Brink 17'; Kwagga Smith 40'; Con: Elton Jantjies 9', 18', 40'; Pen: Elton Jantjies 65'

Kings Park Stadium, Durban
Referee: Jaco Peyper

30 June 2018
16:40

Jaguares	25–14	Stormers
Try: Bautista Delguy 12'; Guido Petti 15'; Matías Orlando 41'; Con: Nicolás Sánchez 13', 42'; Pen: Nicolás Sánchez 4', 73'	Report; Scoreboard	Try: Sikhumbuzo Notshe 25'; Dillyn Leyds 60'; Con: Jean-Luc du Plessis 26', 61'

José Amalfitani Stadium, Buenos Aires
Referee: Angus Gardner

Bye/s: Crusaders

== Round 18 ==
6 July 2018
19:35

Crusaders	45–22	Highlanders
Try: George Bridge 3', 69'; David Havili 14'; Scott Barrett 40'; Richie Mo'unga 43'; Con: Richie Mo'unga 15', 40', 44', 70'; Pen: Richie Mo'unga 21', 30', 63', 74'	Report; Scoreboard	Try: Tyrel Lomax 19'; Ben Smith 35'; Waisake Naholo 46'; Con: Lima Sopoaga 19', 36'; Pen: Lima Sopoaga 24'

AMI Stadium, Christchurch
Referee: Brendon Pickerill

6 July 2018
19:45

Reds	37–23	Rebels
Try: penalty try 25'; Izack Rodda 39'; Filipo Daugunu 40'; Jono Lance 74'; Con: Jono Lance 40', 40', 75'; Pen: Jono Lance 14', 71', 80'; Cards: Duncan Paia'aua (yellow card) 57' to 67'	Report; Scoreboard	Try: Angus Cottrell 28'; Jack Maddocks 32'; Con: Reece Hodge 30', 33'; Pen: Reece Hodge 10', 43', 47'; Cards: Tetera Faulkner (yellow card) 40' to 50'

Suncorp Stadium, Brisbane
Attendance: 10,340
Referee: Paul Williams

7 July 2018
17:15

Chiefs	24–19	Brumbies
Try: Nathan Harris 24'; Damian McKenzie 31'; Johnny Fa'auli 61'; Con: Damian McKenzie 25', 33', 62'; Pen: Damian McKenzie 13'; Cards: Jesse Parete (yellow card) 65' to 75'	Report; Scoreboard	Try: Henry Speight 55', 74'; Tom Banks 71'; Con: Wharenui Hawera 72', 75'

FMG Stadium Waikato, Hamilton
Referee: Rasta Rasivhenge

7 July 2018
19:35

Hurricanes	42–24	Blues
Try: Julian Savea 13'; Ngani Laumape 23', 36', 69', 72'; Beauden Barrett 54'; Con: Jordie Barrett 14', 24', 36', 55', 70', 73'	Report; Scoreboard	Try: Rieko Ioane 38', 47'; Akira Ioane 66'; Con: Stephen Perofeta 39', 48', 66'; Pen: Stephen Perofeta 7'

Westpac Stadium, Wellington
Attendance: 10,715
Referee: Ben O'Keeffe

7 July 2018
19:45

Waratahs	77–25	Sunwolves
Try: Sekope Kepu 11'; Israel Folau 25', 39'; Kurtley Beale 34'; Ned Hanigan 44'; Nick Phipps 47'; Taqele Naiyaravoro 52', 73'; Curtis Rona 61'; Michael Wells 65'; Alex Newsome 75', 80'; Con: Bernard Foley 13', 36', 48', 54', 63', 67', 74'; Pen: Bernard Foley 42'	Report; Scoreboard	Try: Akihito Yamada 22', 55'; Michael Leitch 28'; Con: Hayden Parker 23', 56'; Pen: Hayden Parker 10', 20'; Cards: Semisi Masirewa (red card) 40'; Fumiaki Tanaka (yellow card) 70' to 80'

Allianz Stadium, Sydney
Attendance: 18,059
Referee: Federico Anselmi

7 July 2018
15:05

Bulls	43–34	Jaguares
Try: Johnny Kôtze 22'; Embrose Papier 35'; Jesse Kriel 40'; Jamba Ulengo 52', 65'; Marco van Staden 57'; Con: Handré Pollard 22', 36', 40', 57', 66'; Pen: Handré Pollard 44'	Report; Scoreboard	Try: Nicolás Sánchez 3'; Pablo Matera 5', 80'; Gonzalo Bertranou 19', 46'; Con: Nicolás Sánchez 6', 20', 47'; Pen: Emiliano Boffelli 63'

Loftus Versfeld, Pretoria
Referee: Egon Seconds

7 July 2018
17:15

Stormers	27–16	Sharks
Try: Cobus Wiese 7'; EW Viljoen 30'; Raymond Rhule 37'; Con: Joshua Stander 7', 31', 38'; Pen: Joshua Stander 66', 79'	Report; Scoreboard	Try: Kobus van Wyk 43'; Con: Robert du Preez 44'; Pen: Robert du Preez 5', 10', 19'

DHL Newlands, Cape Town
Referee: Jaco Peyper

Bye/s: Lions

== Round 19 ==
13 July 2018
19:35

Chiefs	28–24	Hurricanes
Try: Brodie Retallick 7'; Brad Weber 17'; Solomon Alaimalo 28'; Mitchell Karpik 70'; Con: Marty McKenzie 9', 19', 29', 71'; Cards: Johnny Fa'auli (red card) 63'	Report; Scoreboard	Try: Wes Goosen 51'; Blade Thomson 60'; Ben May 66'; Julian Savea 80'; Con: Jordie Barrett 52', 61'

FMG Stadium Waikato, Hamilton
Attendance: 17,640
Referee: Mike Fraser

13 July 2018
19:45

Reds	48–27	Sunwolves
Try: Liam Wright 5'; Eto Nabuli 23', 51'; Jono Lance 32'; Taniela Tupou 40'; Duncan Paia'aua 57'; Moses Sorovi 64'; Con: Jono Lance 6', 24', 40', 52', 65'; Pen: Jono Lance 30'; Cards: Duncan Paia'aua (yellow card) 28' to 38'; Caleb Timu (yellow card) 45' to 55'	Report; Scoreboard	Try: penalty try 28'; Ryoto Nakamura 72'; Jaba Bregvadze 75'; Con: Hayden Parker 73', 75'; Pen: Hayden Parker 14', 16'; Cards: Ed Quirk (red card) 37'

Suncorp Stadium, Brisbane
Attendance: 11,057
Referee: Ben O'Keeffe

14 July 2018
17:15

Highlanders	43–37	Rebels
Try: Waisake Naholo 26'; Kayne Hammington 33'; Teihorangi Walden 40'; Tevita Li 63'; Greg Pleasants-Tate 66'; Tom Franklin 76'; Con: Lima Sopoaga 28', 34', 65', 67', 77'; Pen: Lima Sopoaga 6'	Report; Scoreboard	Try: Amanaki Mafi 9'; Reece Hodge 18', 36', 52'; Con: Reece Hodge 10', 20', 37', 53'; Pen: Reece Hodge 3', 59'; Jack Debreczeni 80'; Cards: Michael Ruru (yellow card) 23' to 33'

Forsyth Barr Stadium, Dunedin
Referee: Glen Jackson

14 July 2018
19:35

Crusaders	54–17	Blues
Try: Jack Goodhue 4', 44'; George Bridge 23', 64', 73'; Seta Tamanivalu 40'; Sam Whitelock 77'; Bryn Hall 80'; Con: Richie Mo'unga 24', 40', 44', 66'; Mitchell Hunt 75', 78', 80'	Report; Scoreboard	Try: Melani Nanai 31', 55' penalty try 51'

AMI Stadium, Christchurch
Attendance: 12,000
Referee: Federico Anselmi

14 July 2018
19:45

Waratahs	31–40	Brumbies
Try: Damien Fitzpatrick 32'; Taqele Naiyaravoro 52'; Will Miller 73'; Brad Wilkin 80'; Con: Bernard Foley 34', 53', 74', 80'; Pen: Bernard Foley 10'; Cards: Tom Staniforth (yellow card) 70' to 80'	Report; Scoreboard	Try: Tom Banks 3'; Richie Arnold 12'; Isi Naisarani 20'; Andy Muirhead 35'; Kyle Godwin 48'; Lausii Taliauli 76'; Con: Christian Lealiifano 4', 13', 21', 49'; Wharenui Hawera 77'; Cards: Folau Fainga'a (yellow card) 24' to 34'

Allianz Stadium, Sydney
Attendance: 17,155
Referee: Angus Gardner

14 July 2018
15:05

Lions	38–12	Bulls
Try: Ruan Combrinck 18', 65'; Malcolm Marx 31'; Courtnall Skosan 40' penalty try 63'; Aphiwe Dyantyi 80'; Con: Elton Jantjies 19', 40'; Andries Coetzee 80'	Report; Scoreboard	Try: Manie Libbok 7'; Jesse Kriel 12'; Con: Manie Libbok 8'; Cards: Pierre Schoeman (yellow card) 34' to 44'

Emirates Airline Park, Johannesburg
Referee: Marius van der Westhuizen

14 July 2018
17:15

Sharks	20–10	Jaguares
Try: Akker van der Merwe 22'; Kobus van Wyk 53'; Con: Robert du Preez 23', 53'; Pen: Robert du Preez 9', 16'; Cards: Dan du Preez (yellow card) 19' to 29'	Report; Scoreboard	Try: Sebastián Cancelliere 66'; Con: Joaquín Díaz Bonilla 67'; Pen: Joaquín Díaz Bonilla 20'

Kings Park Stadium, Durban
Referee: Rasta Rasivhenge

Bye/s: Stormers

== See also ==
- 2018 Super Rugby season
