= Angus Blyth =

Australia international rugby union player

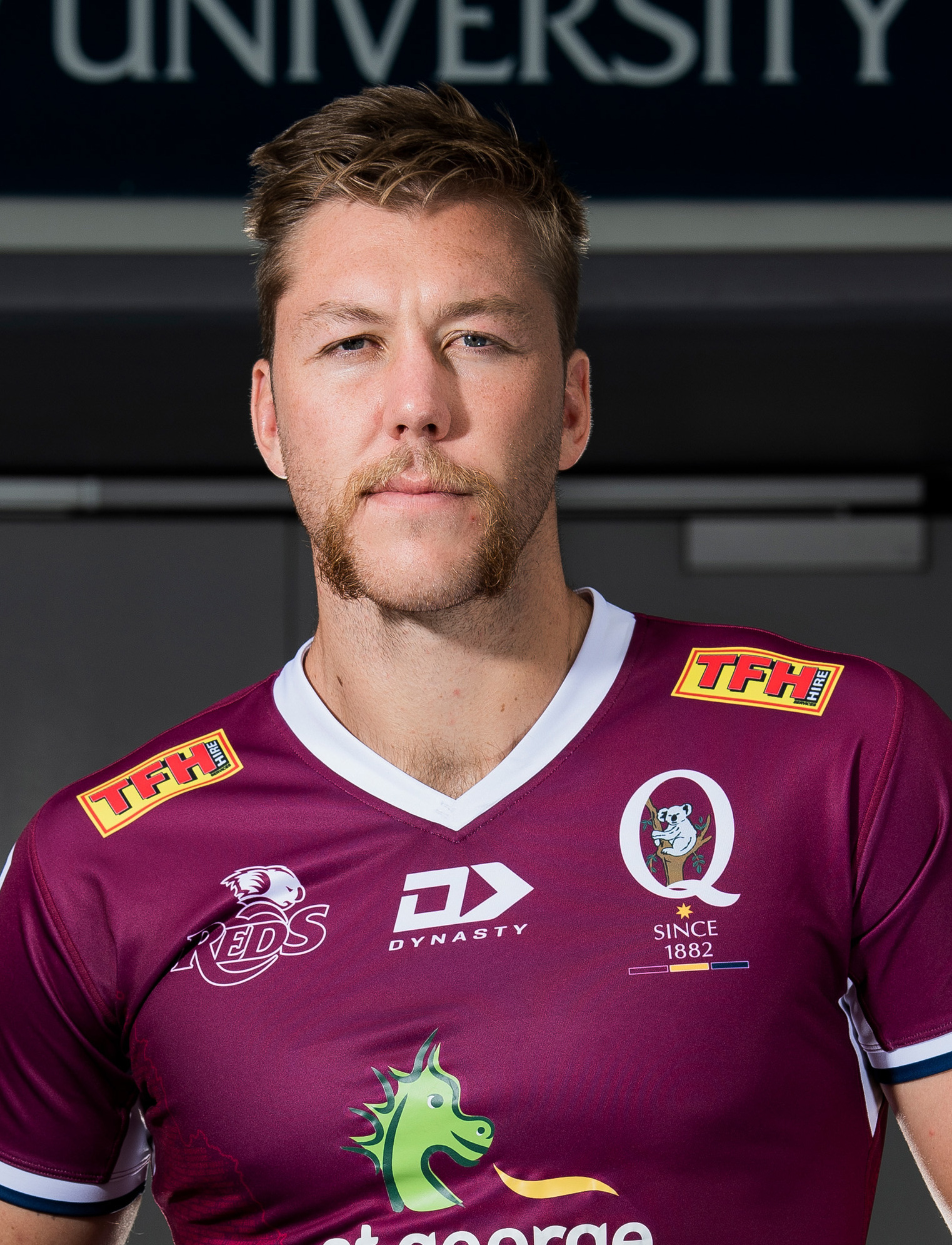
- Born: 4 March 1998 (age 28) Wahroonga, New South Wales, Australia
- Height: 206 cm (6 ft 9 in)
- Weight: 123 kg (271 lb)
- School: The Southport School
- University: Bond University

Rugby union career
- Position: Lock
- Current team: Toyota Industries Shuttles
Youth career
- –2014: Casuarina Beach Rugby Club
- 2014–2016: The Southport School
- –2017: Reds Academy
Amateur team(s)
| Years | Team | Apps | (Points) |
| 2017– | Bond University | | |
Senior career
| Years | Team | Apps | (Points) |
| 2017–2019 | Queensland Country | 23 | (15) |
| 2017–2025 | Reds | 81 | (30) |
| 2026 | Waratahs | 11 | (5) |
| 2026– | Toyota Industries Shuttles | 0 | (0) |
- Correct as of 11 August 2026
International career
| Years | Team | Apps | (Points) |
| 2017–2018 | Australia U20 | 7 | (0) |
| 2024 | Australia A | 1 | (0) |
| 2024 | Australia | 4 | (0) |
| 2025 | ANZAC XV | 1 | (0) |
- Correct as of 27 May 2026

Angus Blyth (born 4 March 1998), nicknamed Gus, is an Australian rugby union player who currently plays as a lock for Japan Rugby League One club Toyota Industries Shuttles.

== Early life and junior career ==
Blyth was born in Wahroonga in Northern Sydney, New South Wales in 1998. He played his junior rugby for the Casuarina Beach Rugby Club in Casuarina in the Northern Rivers region of New South Wales, which is situated 25km from the New South Wales–Queensland border. Blyth was educated at The Southport School (TSS) in Gold Coast, Queensland, and was in the school rugby team's 1st XV for 2015 and 2016, alongside Noah Lolesio and Dylan Riley. Blyth earned a "John Eales Scholarship" to Bond University, and began his schooling there in 2017. During his youth career, Blyth was approached by the Australian rules football team the Gold Coast Suns. He admitted he had never played a game of Australian Football League (AFL) in his life, and that the money they were offering was a lot more than what rugby could, but ultimately rejected the offer.

== Career ==
=== Queensland Country ===
Blyth made his senior professional debut in the first round of Queensland Country's title-winning 2017 season in the National Rugby Championship (NRC) against the Canberra Vikings. He played seven out of ten games for the Queensland Country overall, and started in the teams Grand Final victory.

=== Reds ===
The following year (2018), Blyth made his Super Rugby debut for the Queensland Reds against the Sunwolves in the final round of the regular season. Coming on as a substitute, the Queensland Reds won 48–27 at Lang Park, Brisbane. Despite finishing thirteenth on the overall ladder, and missing finals, the 2018 Queensland Reds season was labelled the most successful in five years. In 2019, Blyth played seven games for the Reds for the Super Rugby. Blyth's most consistent stretch was between rounds thirteen to round seventeen where he started every match. The Reds' 2019 season was poor, however, the team finished second last, only winning six out of sixteen matches.

Following the 2019 Super Rugby season Blyth re-joined the Queensland Country on their 2019 National Rugby Championship campaign. He was an integral part of the teams forward-line, starting every match for the Country and scoring a try in the first round. The Country failed to make the finals, and it was subsequently the teams final season before the National Rugby Championship disbanded due to the COVID-19 pandemic.

In 2020, Blyth had played a total of fifteen games for the Reds in a year disrupted by the COVID-19 pandemic. Initially playing in the first seven games of the 2020 Super Rugby season (which was subsequently disbanded), Blyth played a further seven games in the newly created Super Rugby AU season, and a further two games in the finals series. The Reds finished runners-up to the Brumbies, losing 28–23 at Canberra Stadium. During 2020, Blyth earned up to twenty-three caps for the Reds and became their starting lock. With the Australia national team losing eligible players to overseas clubs, he was touted for a potential Wallabies call-up.

Blyth became a first-team pick for the Reds throughout the 2021 (AU, TT) to the 2023 Super Rugby seasons. Going into the 2024 Super Rugby Pacific season, Blyth had over 50 caps for the Queensland Reds. Although he only played five Super Rugby matches in 2024, he earned a call-up for the Wallabies.

=== Waratahs ===
In July 2025, Blyth signed with the Queensland rivals, the New South Wales Waratahs, for the 2026 season. He played a total of eleven games, starting in three. He scored one try. The Waratahs announced the departure of several payers following the conclusion of the 2026 season, including Blyth.

=== Japan ===
On 3 August 2026, the Toyota Industries Shuttles in the Japan Rugby League One announced the signing of Blyth among six new players joining the squad.

== International career ==
Having been in The Southport School's 1st XV in his youth, Blyth was selected for the Australia U20 (Junior Wallabies) team for the 2017 Oceania Rugby U20 Championship. Playing at least one match for the Junior Wallabies, Blyth was again selected for the team ahead of the 2017 World Rugby U20 Championship that took place in Georgia. The following year Blyth was again selected in the Junior Wallabies' international campaigns, and featured in all five of their 2018 World Rugby U20 Championship fixtures.

In 2024, Blyth was selected for Australia for Wales' 2024 tour of Australia. Blyth made his international debut for Australia against Wales on 6 July 2024, coming on as a substitute in the 41st minute for Jeremy Williams. Upon reflection of his selection, Blyth admitted he was surprised he got the call-up. Blyth had been the longest-serving lock in any Australian Super Rugby team without an Australia cap, having played over sixty games for the Reds.

He played another three games for Australia in 2024, and made an appearances for Australia A on their Spring tour. Australia A lost 17–38 against the England Saxons in Twickenham Stoop, London.

== Career statistics ==
=== Club ===
As of 11 August 2026.

Appearances and tries by club, season and competition
| Club | Season | League | | | |
| Club | Season | Division | Apps | Tries | Points |
|---|---|---|---|---|---|
| Queensland Country | 2017 | National Rugby Championship | 6 | 0 | 0 |
| Queensland Country | 2018 | National Rugby Championship | 9 | 2 | 10 |
| Queensland Country | Total | | 15 | 2 | 10 |
| Reds | 2018 | Super Rugby | 1 | 0 | 0 |
| Queensland Country | 2019 | National Rugby Championship | 6 | 1 | 5 |
| Reds | 2019 | Super Rugby | 7 | 1 | 5 |
| Reds | 2020 | Super Rugby | 6 | 0 | 0 |
| Reds | 2020 | Super Rugby AU | 9 | 1 | 5 |
| Reds | 2021 | Super Rugby AU | 5 | 0 | 0 |
| Reds | 2021 | Super Rugby Trans-Tasman | 3 | 0 | 0 |
| Reds | 2022 | Super Rugby Pacific | 15 | 0 | 0 |
| Reds | 2023 | Super Rugby Pacific | 8 | 0 | 0 |
| Reds | 2024 | Super Rugby Pacific | 5 | 0 | 0 |
| Reds | 2025 | Super Rugby Pacific | 14 | 2 | 10 |
| Reds | Total | | 72 | 4 | 20 |
| Waratahs | 2026 | Super Rugby Pacific | 11 | 1 | 5 |
| Career total | | | 105 | 8 | 40 |

=== International ===
As of 11 August 2026.

Appearances and tries by national team and year
| National team | Year | | | |
| National team | Year | Apps | Tries | Points |
|---|---|---|---|---|
| Australia | 2024 | 4 | 0 | 0 |
| Australia A | 2024 | 1 | 0 | 0 |
| Total | | 5 | 0 | 0 |
