= Liam Polwart =

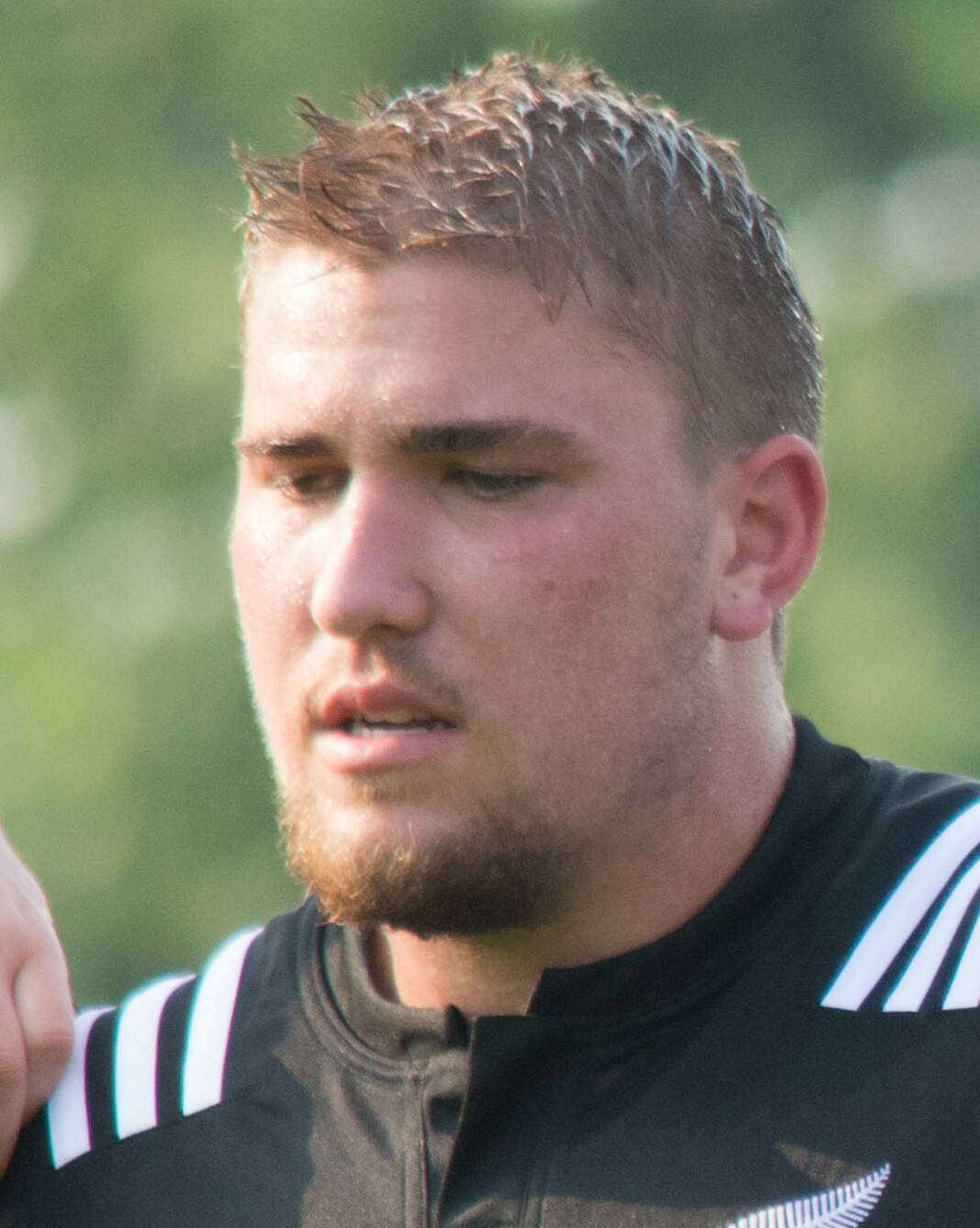
- Born: 1995/04/02
- Height: 1.85 m (6 ft 1 in)
- Weight: 107 kg (16 st 12 lb; 236 lb)
- School: Sacred Heart College, Auckland
- Notable relative: Sean Polwart{Kieran Polwart} (brothers)

Rugby union career
- Position: Hooker
- Current team: Bay of Plenty / Chiefs
Senior career
Years	Team	Apps	(Points)
2016–	BOP	15	(5)
2017–	Chiefs	22	(10)
- Correct as of 28 April 2019
International career
Years	Team	Apps	(Points)
2015	New Zealand U20	8	(0)
2017	Māori All Blacks	2	(0)
- Correct as of 28 April 2019

Liam Polwart (born 2 April 1995) was a New Zealand rugby union player who currently plays as a hooker for Bay of Plenty in New Zealand's domestic Mitre 10 Cup and for the Chiefs in the international Super Rugby competition.

== Youth career ==
Polwart attended Sacred Heart College in Auckland and during that time was a New Zealand secondary schools Barbarians representative, he also went on to captain Auckland at under-19 level before moving to the Bay of Plenty along with New Zealand under-20 team-mates Mitchell Karpik and Henry Stowers in late 2015.

== Senior career ==
Polwart made his senior debut for the Bay of Plenty Steamers during the 2016 Mitre 10 Cup season and went on to make 6 appearances before injury curtailed his campaign.

== Super Rugby ==
Despite having only made 6 senior appearances, Polwart was named in the Chiefs squad ahead of the 2017 Super Rugby season, where he would compete with All Blacks Hika Elliot and Nathan Harris for the number 2 jersey.

== International ==
Polwart was a member of the New Zealand Under-20 side which competed in the 2015 World Rugby Under 20 Championship in Italy, making 5 appearances.
