= Roger Davis (rugby union) =

Australian rugby union international

- Full name: Roger Andrew Davis
- Born: 23 October 1951 (age 75) Sydney, Australia

Rugby union career
- Position: Lock
International career
Years	Team	Apps	(Points)
1974	Australia	3	(0)

Roger Andrew Davis (born 23 October 1951) is an Australian former banking executive and rugby union international.

Davis, born in Sydney, was educated at The King's School, Parramatta.

A lock, Davis was a lineout specialist and played for Sydney University Football Club, where he developed his game under future Wallabies coach David Brockhoff. He featured in all three Tests on New Zealand's 1974 tour of Australia, before taking up a Rhodes Scholarship to study at Pembroke College, Oxford. While at Oxford, Davis earned rugby blues in 1974 and 1975. He later served nine years as chairman of New South Wales Rugby Union.

Davis was Bank of Queensland chairman from 2013 to 2019.

== See also ==
- List of Australia national rugby union players
