= Jordan Petaia =

Australian rugby union & American football player (born 2000)

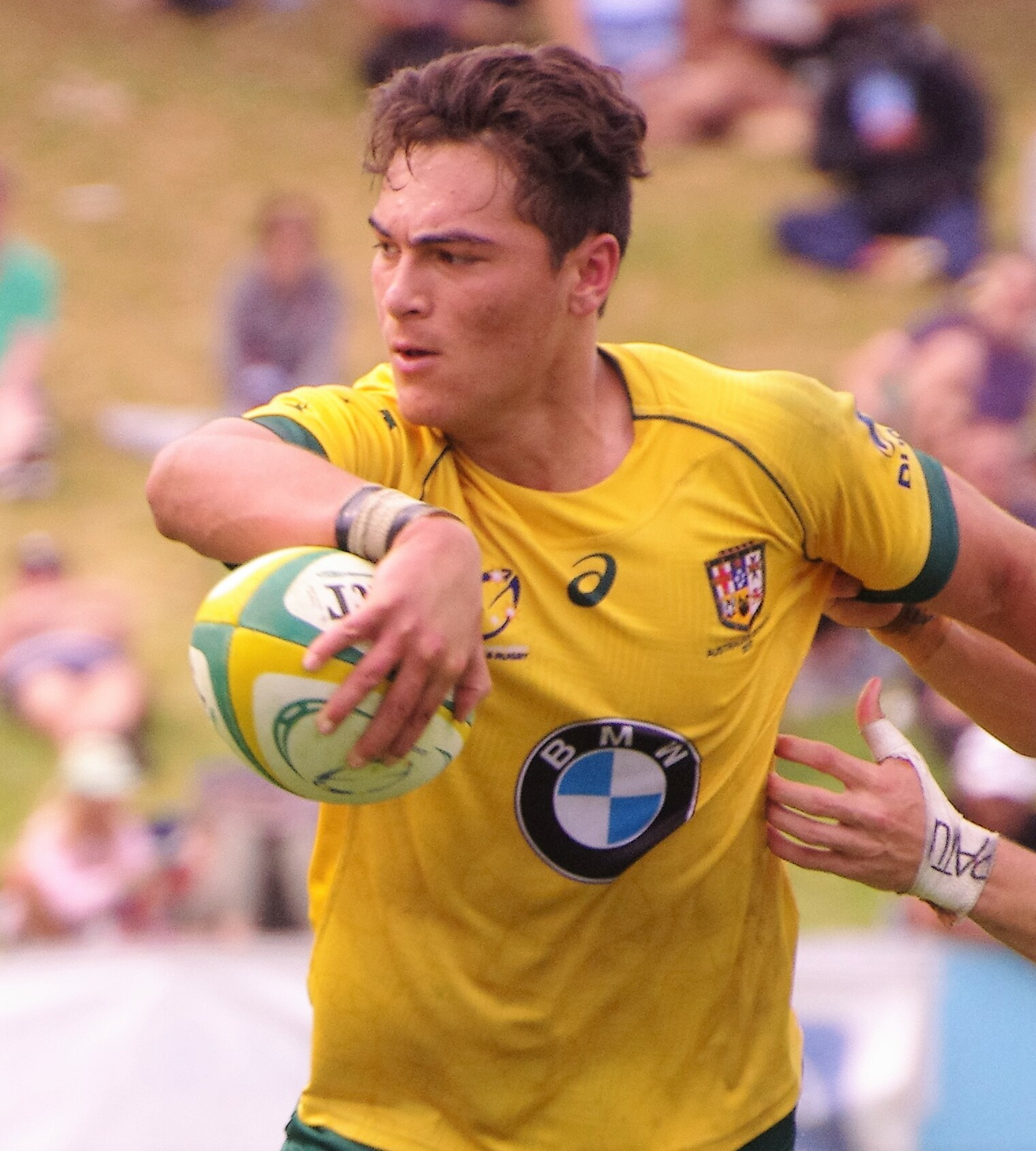
- Born: 14 March 2000 (age 26) Werribee, Victoria, Australia
- Height: 1.90 m (6 ft 3 in)
- Weight: 103 kg (16 st 3 lb; 227 lb)
- School: Brisbane State High School

Rugby union career
- Position(s): Wing, Centre, Fullback
- Current team: Urayasu D-Rocks
Youth career
- 2013–2017: Brisbane State High School
Senior career
Years	Team	Apps	(Points)
2018–2024	Reds	58	(80)
2018	Queensland Country	9	(55)
2025–2026	USA Perpignan	13	(5)
2026–	Urayasu D-Rocks	0	(0)
- Correct as of 7 April 2026
International career
Years	Team	Apps	(Points)
2017	Australia Schoolboys	1	(0)
2018	Australia U20	2	(0)
2019–2023	Australia	31	(35)
- Correct as of 10 April 2026
- Football career

Profile
- Position: Tight end

Career information
- High school: Brisbane State High School
- NFL draft: 2025: undrafted

Career history
- Los Angeles Chargers (2025)*
- * Offseason or practice squad member only

Jordan Petaia (born 14 March 2000) is an Australian professional rugby union player who plays as an outside back for Japan Rugby League One club Urayasu D-Rocks. He began his professional career the Queensland Reds in the Super Rugby and made his Test debut for Australia in 2019. In 2025, Petaia made the switch to American football, playing tight end for the Los Angeles Chargers of the National Football League, before returning to rugby union.

== Early life ==
Petaia was born in the Melbourne suburb of Werribee, and is of Samoan and Australian heritage. He was born in Victoria in 2000, and raised in Brisbane, Queensland.

During his time at Brisbane State High School Petaia spent time playing on the wing for the 2016 1st XV Premiership team and in his final year played fullback. In his final year at the school he was selected in the Australian Schools Rugby Union side that played Fiji and New Zealand. Petaia has cited former Queensland Reds player Will Genia in the 2011 Super Rugby Final as a turning point in his journey in becoming a professional rugby player.

== Career ==
Petaia made his Super Rugby debut on 7 April 2018, round eight, against the Brumbies at Canberra Stadium. The Reds lost 45–21. Petaia scored his first ever try in the Super Rugby and for the Queensland Reds in round 14 against the Hurricanes, losing narrowly, 38–34 in Wellington. Petaia's second try came against southern rivals the Waratahs in round sixteen. The Queensland Reds lost at home, 41–52.

Petaia spent most of 2024, his final season with the Reds before transitioning to American football, plagued by injury. He returned to professional rugby in 2025, signing for French club USA Perpignan in the Top 14. He made 13 appearances for Perpignan throughout the 2025–26 season, scoring one try.

In July 2026, Petaia was announced as the latest international player signing for the Urayasu D-Rocks in the Japan Rugby League One, joining Australian teammate Samu Kerevi ahead of the 2026–27 season.

== International career ==
Being born in Australia to a Samoan parent, Petaia is eligible to represent Australia or Samoa at international level.

Petaia was called up to the Australia squad by coach Michael Cheika in early August 2018, before the first Bledisloe Test in Sydney. However, he did not make the final team to play against New Zealand.

Petaia's international debut was during a pool match against Uruguay in the 2019 Rugby World Cup, scoring a try on his second touch. He set up another try before being rested at half-time.

Petaia was named in Australia's 34-man squad ahead of their September 2026 Test match against South Africa at Perth Stadium. It was the first time in over three years he had been in the Wallabies setup. However, while training with the squad ahead of their Bledisloe Cup series against New Zealand, Petaia suffered an ankle injury and returned to Japan.

=== International tries ===
List of international tries scored by Jordan Petaia
No.	Opponent	Location	Competition	Date	Result	Ref.
1	Uruguay	Ōita Bank Dome, Ōita	2019 Rugby World Cup	5 October 2019	45–10	
2	Japan	Shōwa Denko Dome Ōita, Ōita	2021 Autumn Internationals	23 October 2021	32–23	
3	England	Perth Stadium, Perth	2022 England tour of Australia	2 July 2022	30–28	
4	Argentina	Estadio Malvinas Argentinas, Mendoza	2022 Rugby Championship	6 August 2022	41–26	
5	New Zealand	Eden Park, Auckland	2022 Rugby Championship	24 September 2022	14–40	
6	Ireland	Aviva Stadium, Dublin	2022 Autumn Internationals	19 November 2022	10–13	
7	Georgia	Stade de France, Saint-Denis	2023 Rugby World Cup	9 September 2023	35–15	

== American football career ==
In December 2024, Petaia left the Queensland Reds to pursue an American football career. On 9 December 2024, he was selected for the National Football League's International Player Pathway (IPP) program at the position of tight end.

Petaia signed with the Los Angeles Chargers on 2 April 2025. He was waived/injured on 7 August.
