= Nick Duffy (rugby union) =

Australian rugby union player

- Born: Nicholas Duffy; 16 February 1996 (age 30) Australia

Rugby union career
- Position: Scrum-half
Senior career
| Years | Team | Apps | (Points) |
| 2017– | Sydney Rays | 7 | (5) |
Super Rugby
| Years | Team | Apps | (Points) |
| 2018– | Waratahs | 0 | (0) |

Nick Duffy (born 16 February 1996) is an Australian rugby union player who plays for the Waratahs in the Super Rugby competition. His position of choice is scrum-half.
