= Tom Banks (rugby union, born 1994) =

Australia international rugby union player

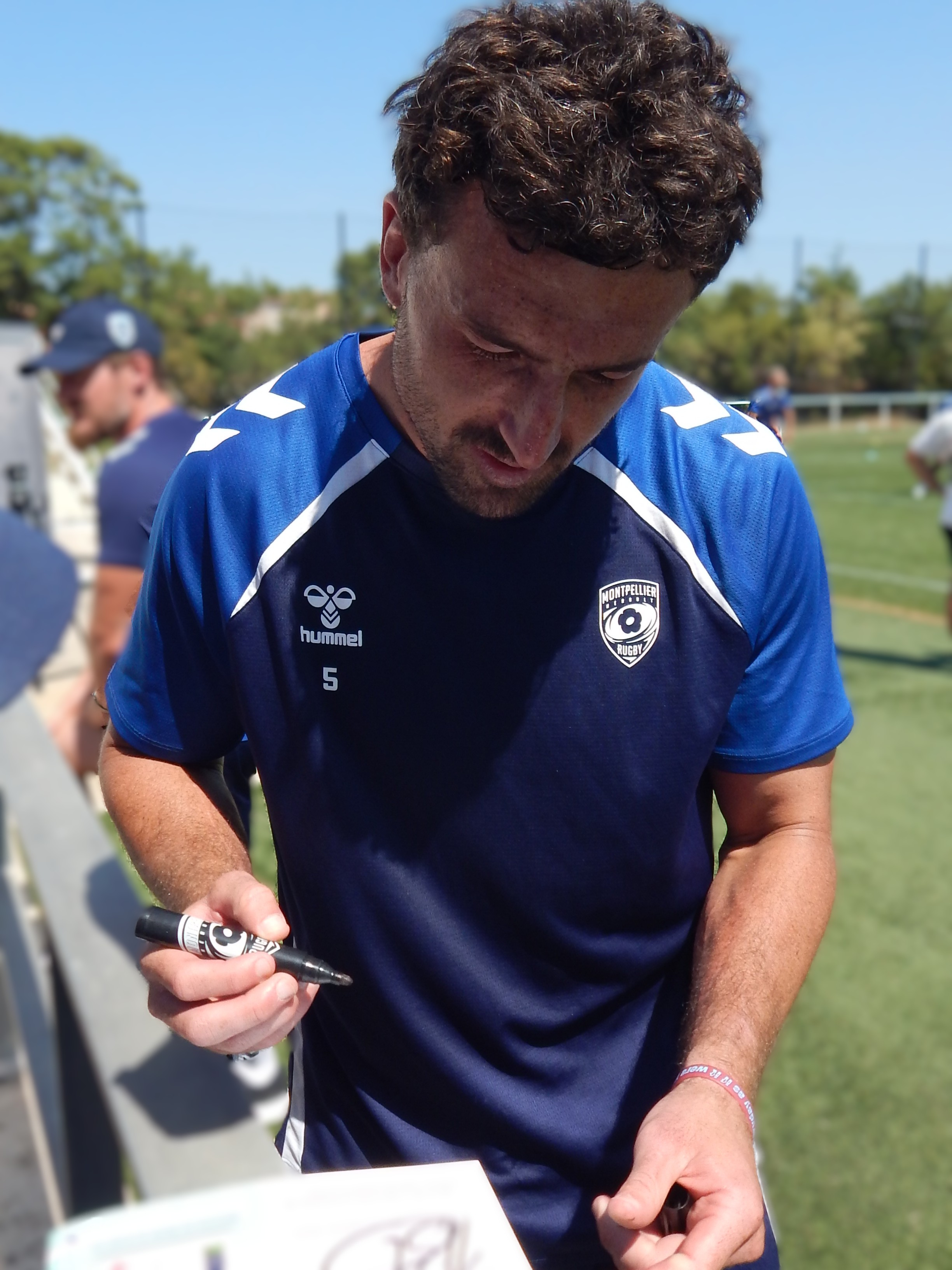
- Tom Banks in 2025
- Full name: Thomas William Banks
- Born: 18 June 1994 (age 32) Brisbane, Queensland, Australia
- Height: 186 cm (6 ft 1 in)
- Weight: 93 kg (205 lb; 14 st 9 lb)
- School: Brisbane Boys' College

Rugby union career
- Position(s): Fullback, Wing
- Current team: Montpellier
Youth career
- 2013–2016: University of Queensland
Senior career
Years	Team	Apps	(Points)
2015–2016	Queensland Reds	2	(0)
2015–2016	Queensland Country	13	(36)
2017–2022	ACT Brumbies	85	(187)
2017–2019	Canberra Vikings	19	(66)
2022–2025	Mie Honda Heat	39	(90)
2025-	Montpellier	24	(20)
- Correct as of 16 May 2026
International career
Years	Team	Apps	(Points)
2018–2022	Australia	22	(15)
- Correct as of 31 October 2022

Thomas Banks (born 18 June 1994) is an Australian professional rugby union player who currently plays for Montpellier in the Top 14. He has represented Australia in international rugby between 2018 and 2022. Banks started his Super Rugby career with the Queensland Reds in 2015. He has played in the National Rugby Championship (NRC) for Queensland Country and the Canberra Vikings. His preferred position is fullback or wing.

== Early years ==
Thomas Banks was born in Brisbane, Queensland. He attended school at Brisbane Boys' College during which time he represented Queensland at schoolboy rugby in 2011 and 2012. He moved on to play for the University of Queensland in the Queensland Premier Rugby competition from 2013.

== Rugby career ==
In 2014, Banks played for the Queensland Reds at under 20 level and was also a member of their wider training squad, He didn't make the senior squad for the following season, but did manage to earn his first cap as a substitute in a match against the Brumbies at Suncorp Stadium. In 2015 and 2016 he played for Queensland Country in the National Rugby Championship.

Banks missed out on selection for the Reds 2016 Super Rugby squad. Despite this, he picked up a second Super Rugby cap in the final match of the 2016 season against the Rebels.

Banks signed a one-year Super Rugby deal with the Brumbies for the 2017 season. After impressing in his first season of play for the Brumbies, Banks was called up to join the Australia national team squad later that year to replace the injured Dane Haylett-Petty. He was also selected by former Grand Slam-winning coach Alan Jones in the Barbarians squad to play the Wallabies at Allianz Stadium in late October 2017.

== Super Rugby statistics ==
As of 14 July 2018

Season	Team	Games	Start	Sub	Mins	T	C	PG	DG	Pts	YC	RC
2015	Reds	1	0	1	6	0	0	0	0	0	0	0
2016	Reds	1	1	0	80	0	0	0	0	0	0	0
2017	Brumbies	10	8	2	675	3	0	0	0	15	1	0
2018	Brumbies	16	14	2	1128	9	0	0	0	45	0	0
Total		28	23	5	1897	12	0	0	0	60	1	0
