= Alex Mafi =

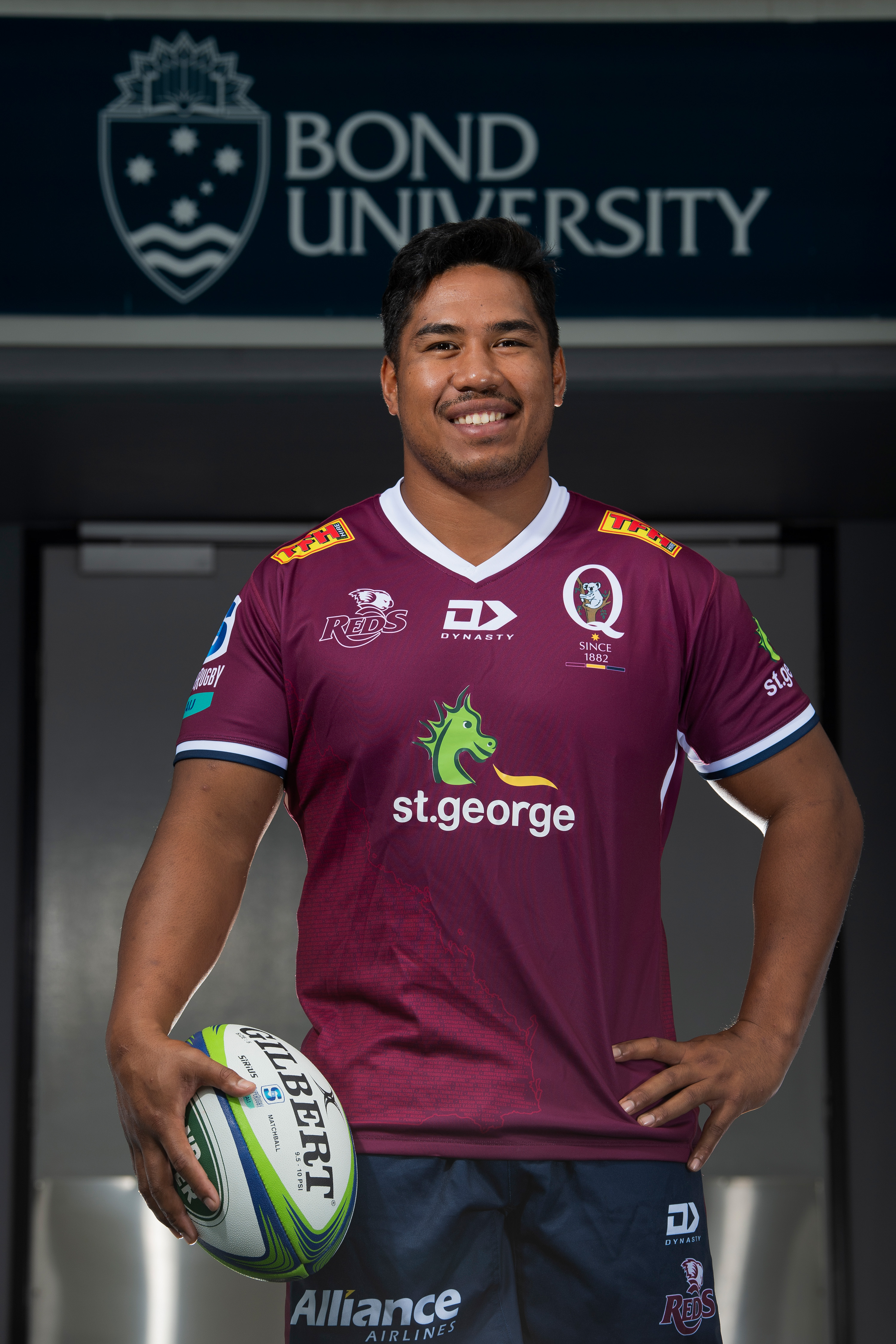
- Mafi in 2021
- Born: Alekisio Joshua Mafi; 7 November 1996 (age 30) Brisbane, Australia
- Height: 177 cm (5 ft 10 in)
- Weight: 107 kg (16 st 12 lb)
- School: St Joseph's College, Nudgee

Rugby union career
- Position: Hooker
Senior career
| Years | Team | Apps | (Points) |
| 2015–2019 | Queensland Country | 16 | (0) |
| 2016–2022 | Reds | 60 | (65) |
| 2018 | NTT Shining Arcs | 6 | (10) |
| 2023–2024 | Rebels | 21 | (20) |
| 2024–2026 | Suntory Sungoliath | 1 | (0) |
- Correct as of 8 June 2024

Joshua Alekisio Mafi born 7 November 1996 in Brisbane, Australia, is an Australian rugby union player who plays at Hooker for Queensland Reds in Super Rugby.

== Career ==
After three years of First XV experience at St. Joseph's Nudgee College from 2012 to 2014, Bond University awarded him the John Eales Rugby Scholarship to help keep him in Gold Coast rugby.

During the 2015 Season playing for Bond University, he signed for Queensland Country for the 2015 National Rugby Championship.

Mafi earned himself a contract with the Queensland Reds for 3 years starting in 2016.

== Super Rugby statistics ==
As of 3 June 2023

| Season | Team | Games | Starts | Sub | Mins | Tries | Cons | Pens | Drops | Points | Yel | Red |
|---|---|---|---|---|---|---|---|---|---|---|---|---|
| 2017 | Reds | 8 | 1 | 7 | 139 | 1 | 0 | 0 | 0 | 5 | 0 | 0 |
| 2018 | Reds | 13 | 1 | 12 | 370 | 3 | 0 | 0 | 0 | 15 | 0 | 0 |
| 2019 | Reds | 16 | 11 | 5 | 790 | 1 | 0 | 0 | 0 | 5 | 0 | 0 |
| 2020 | Reds | 7 | 6 | 1 | 547 | 1 | 0 | 0 | 0 | 5 | 0 | 0 |
| 2020 AU | Reds | 5 | 0 | 5 | 150 | 1 | 0 | 0 | 0 | 5 | 0 | 0 |
| 2021 AU | Reds | 9 | 4 | 5 | 397 | 6 | 0 | 0 | 0 | 30 | 0 | 0 |
| 2021 TT | Reds | 0 | 0 | 0 | 0 | 0 | 0 | 0 | 0 | 0 | 0 | 0 |
| 2022 | Reds | 2 | 2 | 0 | 120 | 0 | 0 | 0 | 0 | 0 | 0 | 0 |
| 2023 | Rebels | 13 | 11 | 2 | 634 | 4 | 0 | 0 | 0 | 20 | 0 | 0 |
| Total | | 73 | 36 | 37 | 3,147 | 17 | 0 | 0 | 0 | 85 | 0 | 0 |
