= Aidan Toua =

- Full name: Aidan Manoa Toua
- Born: 19 January 1990 (age 36) Port Moresby, Papua New Guinea
- Height: 183 cm (6 ft 0 in)
- Weight: 92 kg (203 lb; 14 st 7 lb)
- School: Anglican Church Grammar School

Rugby union career
- Position: Fullback
Senior career
Years	Team	Apps	(Points)
2011–2014, 2018-2019	Reds	24	(10)
2014–2015	Agen	20	(10)
2015	Canberra Vikings	4	(5)
2016–2017	Brumbies	30	(20)
2017–2020	Honda Heat	23	(75)
- Correct as of 22 February 2019
International career
Years	Team	Apps	(Points)
2010	Australia U20	5	(20)
- Correct as of 21 June 2010
National sevens team
Years	Team		Comps
2009	Australia		5
- Correct as of 31 May 2009

Aidan Manoa Toua (born 19 January 1990) is a rugby union player for Japanese team Honda Heat. He previously played Super Rugby for the Queensland Reds and ACT Brumbies. His usual position is fullback.

Toua was educated at the Anglican Church Grammar School.

In February 2013, Toua was named to start at fullback for the Reds against the Hurricanes in Brisbane.

In 2020, he announced his retirement from rugby. But he continues to play for his local club, Easts Tigers, and helps with coaching at his former high school's First XV

In 2022, he was selected in the Papua New Guinea national rugby union team, known as the Pukpuks.
