= Jono Lance =

Australian rugby union player (born 1990)

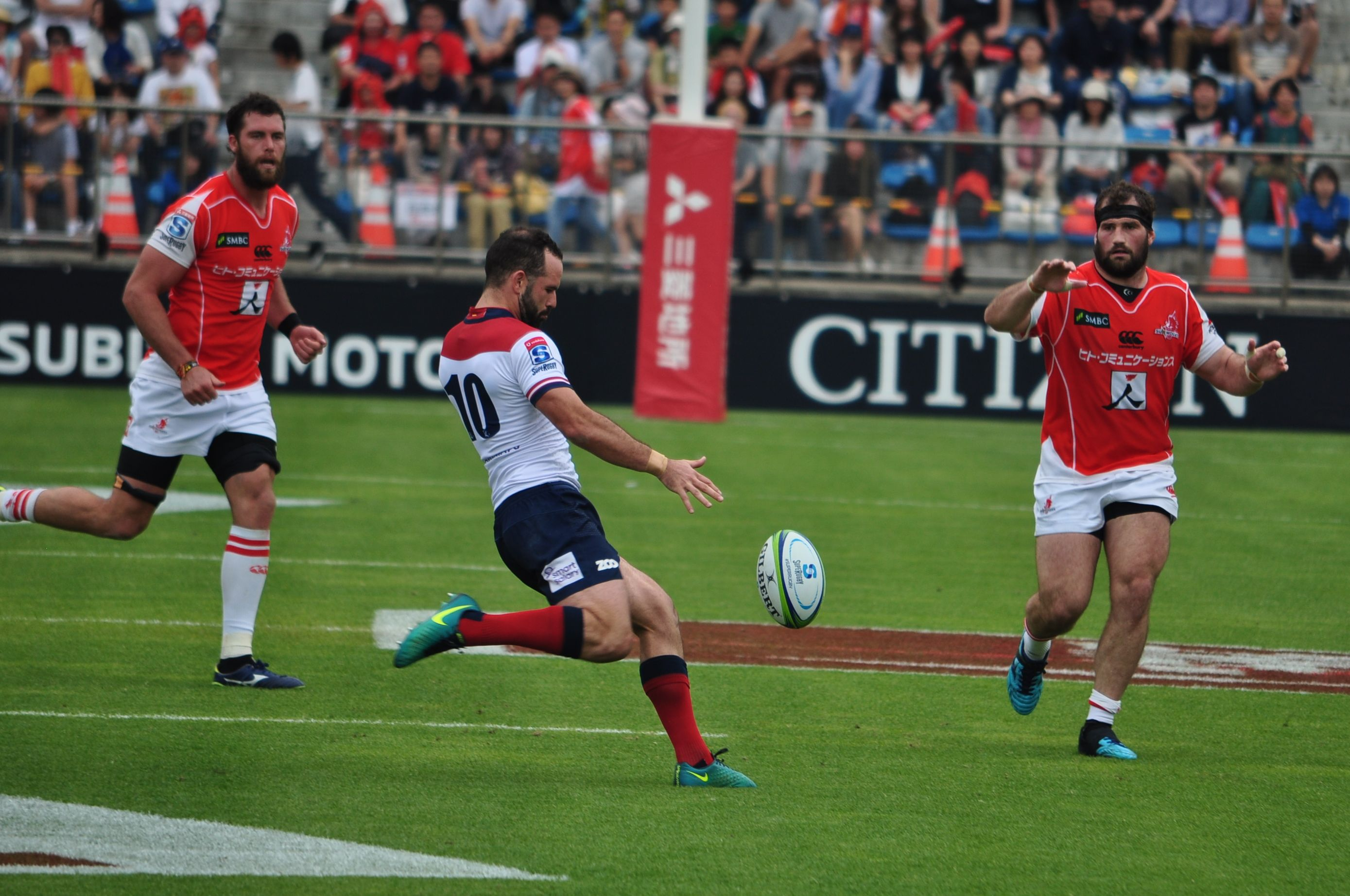
- Lance during a match representing the Reds, May 2018
- Born: 27 June 1990 (age 36) Canberra, Australia
- Height: 183 cm (6 ft 0 in)
- Weight: 91 kg (201 lb; 14 st 5 lb)
- School: The Southport School
- Notable relative: Dean Lance (father)
- Occupation: president

Rugby union career
- Position(s): First five-eighth, fullback
Senior career
Years	Team	Apps	(Points)
2011–2018	Reds	34	(104)
2014–2015	Waratahs	13	(5)
2014–2015	Eastern Suburbs	7	(32)
2015	NSW Country Eagles	8	(82)
2016–2021	Force	28	(116)
2016–2017	Perth Spirit	10	(63)
2017–2020	Worcester Warriors	29	(82)
2022	Mie Honda Heat	11	(61)
- Correct as of 27 May 2022
International career
Years	Team	Apps	(Points)
2010	Australia U20	2	(5)
- Correct as of 27 May 2022
National sevens team
Years	Team		Comps
2010–2011	Australia		8
- Correct as of 20 July 2020

Jono Lance (born 27 June 1990) is a professional rugby union footballer who previously played for Western Force in the Super Rugby AU competition. He usually plays at full-back, fly-half or centre.

== Early life ==
Lance was born in Canberra, Australia.

== Career ==
He made his debut during the 2011 Super Rugby season for the Queensland Reds against the Western Force in Perth. After three years at the Reds he signed with the NSW Waratahs on a two-year deal starting in the 2014 season.

Lance played in the National Rugby Championship for the New South Wales Country Eagles in 2015 before joining the Western Force for the 2016 season.

Following the axing of the Force from the Super Rugby competition from 2018 onwards, Lance signed a short-term deal with English Premiership side Worcester. During this time he also signed with the Melbourne Rebels joining fellow former Force players, Adam Coleman, Dane Haylett-Petty, Richard Hardwick & Bill Meakes. When Lance returned to Australia, the Rebels released him to then sign with the Queensland Reds without making an appearance for the Melbourne franchise. Lance rejoined the Reds following another cocaine-related controversy for Wallaby Karmichael Hunt and head coach Brad Thorn's dismissal of 70-test Wallaby & fellow 2011 Premiership-winner Quade Cooper.

On 1 May 2020, it was announced Lance would travel to Scotland capital Edinburgh in the Pro14 from the 2020-21 season. But, his move to Edinburgh was called off due to failing to get a UK visa.

He has since joined Western Force for the newly formed Super Rugby AU season.

== Super Rugby statistics ==
As of 19 November 2017

Season	Team	Games	Starts	Sub	Mins	Tries	Cons	Pens	Drops	Points	Yel	Red
2011	Reds	4	4	0	320	0	0	0	0	0	0	0
2012	Reds	4	4	0	164	0	0	1	0	3	0	0
2013	Reds	13	11	2	870	1	0	0	0	5	1	0
2014	Waratahs	9	4	5	294	1	0	0	0	5	0	0
2015	Waratahs	4	0	4	31	0	0	0	0	0	0	0
2016	Force	6	6	0	399	1	3	11	0	44	0	0
2017	Force	12	8	4	674	3	9	9	0	60	0	0
Total		51	36	15	2762	6	12	20	0	114	1	0
