= Caleb Timu =

Australia international rugby union footballer

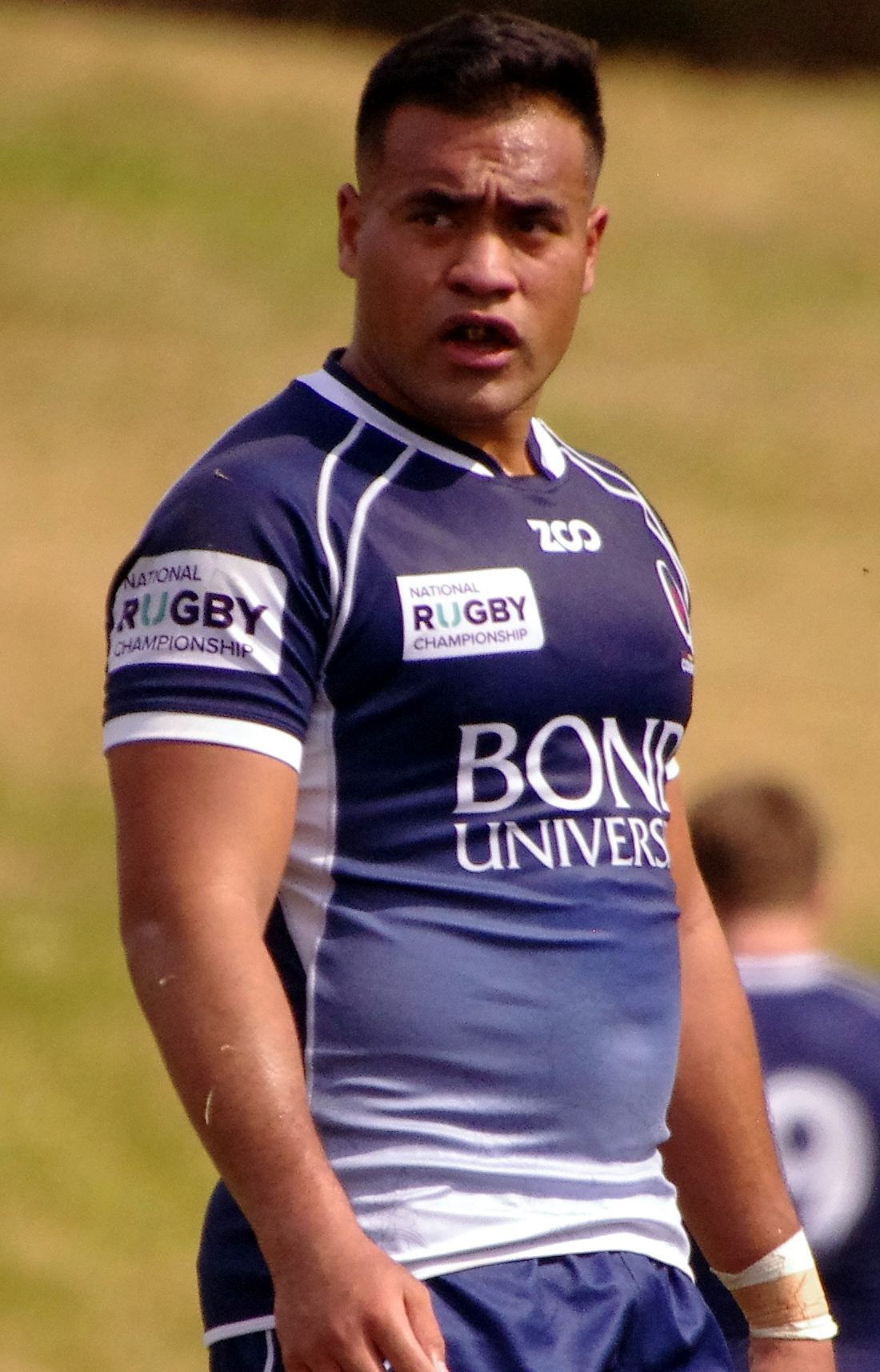
- Born: 22 February 1994 (age 32) Auckland, New Zealand
- Height: 190 cm (6 ft 3 in)
- Weight: 117 kg (18 st 6 lb)
- School: St Joseph's College, Nudgee; Marsden State High School

Rugby union career
- Position: Loose forward
Amateur team(s)
Years	Team	Apps	(Points)
2011, 2018–2019.	Souths		
Senior career
Years	Team	Apps	(Points)
2017-2019	Queensland Country	14	(25)
2019-2021	Montpellier	38	(25)
2022-2023	Bordeaux	17	(5)
2023-2023	Clermont	4	
2024-	Colomiers		
Super Rugby
Years	Team	Apps	(Points)
2016-19	Reds	21	(25)
International career
Years	Team	Apps	(Points)
2011	Australia Schoolboys	1	
2018	Australia	2	(0)

Caleb Timu (born 22 February 1994) is a New Zealand-born Australian rugby footballer of Samoan heritage who played rugby union for the Queensland Reds in the Super Rugby competition and for Montpellier Herault Rugby, Union Bordeaux Begles, ASM Clermont Auvergne Top 14. His position of choice is back row/loose forward.

== Early life ==
Timu was born in Auckland, New Zealand, but his family migrated to Australia when he was five-years-old. Timu attended Marsden State High School and subsequently St Joseph's Nudgee College, where he was part of the Queensland team that won the Australian Schools Championship in 2011. He was selected for the Australian Schoolboys team that year.

== Career ==
=== Rugby league ===
Timu began his rugby league career with the Goodna Eagles in the Ipswich competition. He started his professional career playing rugby league with the Brisbane Broncos in the Australian National Rugby League. He was a second-row in the Broncos Under-20s team in the 2012 and 2013 Holden Cups. He was named in the 2012 Holden Cup team of the year and represented the Queensland under-20s side in 2012 and 2013.

After serving for two years as a missionary for the Church of Jesus Christ of Latter-day Saints in New Zealand and the Cook Islands Timu returned to the Broncos. He played for the Souths Logan Magpies in the Queensland Cup and for the Broncos in the 2016 NRL Auckland Nines.

=== Rugby union ===
Timu signed with the Reds in 2016 and in the 2018 season was under the tutelage of former All Blacks and Kangaroos international Brad Thorn. Timu also won Player of the Year honours for his contributions to Bond University Queensland Country's winning the National Rugby Championship title in 2017.

== Personal life ==
Timu is married to Pamera Paasi and the couple have three children.
