= Nick Palmer (rugby union) =

- Born: 8 October 1991 (age 35) Newcastle, Australia
- Height: 198 cm (6 ft 6 in)
- Weight: 105 kg (16 st 7 lb; 231 lb)
- School: St Joseph's College Hunters Hill
- University: Newcastle University

Rugby union career
- Position: Lock
- Current team: Northern Suburbs Rugby Club - Sydney
Senior career
Years	Team	Apps	(Points)
2015	New South Wales Country Eagles	8	(0)
2016	Sydney Rays	3	(6)
2017	Hawke's Bay	8	(0)
Super Rugby
Years	Team	Apps	(Points)
2018–2019	Waratahs	0	(0)

Nick Palmer (born 8 October 1991) is an Australian rugby union player who played for the Waratahs in the Super Rugby competition. His position of choice is lock.
