= 2016 National Rugby Championship =

- Date: 27 August – 22 October 2016
- Champions: Perth Spirit (1st title)
- Runners-up: NSW Country Eagles
- Matches played: 31

Official website
- buildcorpnrc.com.au

The 2016 National Rugby Championship (known as the Buildcorp National Rugby Championship for sponsorship reasons) was the third season of Australia's National Rugby Championship. It involved eight professional rugby union teams, one team fewer than in the previous two seasons. The competition kicked off on 27 August 2016.

== Teams ==
Location of teams in the 2016 National Rugby Championship

Legend:

BC – Brisbane City
CV – Canberra Vikings
CE – Country Eagles
MR – Melbourne Rising
PS – Perth Spirit
QC – Queensland Country
SR – Sydney Rays
WSR – Western Sydney Rams

A major change was made for the 2016 season with the scrapping of the Sydney Stars team. The Australian Rugby Union did not renew their licence for the competition to consolidate playing strength of the teams in New South Wales. The North Harbour Rays subsequently changed their name to become the Sydney Rays. Prior to the season it was also reported that the Canberra Vikings would be renamed the Canberra Kookaburras in a return to the traditional name of the ACT team, but this change was postponed until at least the 2017 season.

The eight teams for the 2016 NRC season include three from New South Wales, two from Queensland, and one each from Australian Capital Territory, Victoria, and Western Australia:

Region	Team	Coach(es)	Captain(s)	Refs
ACT	Canberra Vikings	(Australia) Wayne Southwell	(Australia) Jarrad Butler	
NSW	NSW Country Eagles	(Australia) Darren Coleman	(Australia) Paddy Ryan	
NSW	Sydney Rays	(Australia) Simon Cron	(Australia) Matt Lucas	
NSW	Western Sydney Rams	(Australia) John Muggleton	(Australia) Paul Asquith	
QLD	Brisbane City	(Australia) Rod Seib	(Australia) Sam Talakai	
QLD	Queensland Country	(Australia) Toutai Kefu	(Australia) James Tuttle	
VIC	Melbourne Rising	(Australia) Zane Hilton	(Australia) Nic Stirzaker	
WA	Perth Spirit	(Australia) Dwayne Nestor	(Australia) Heath Tessmann	

Home match venues scheduled for the 2016 NRC season:

Region	Team	Match Venue	Capacity	City
ACT	Canberra Vikings	Viking Park	8,000	Canberra
NSW	NSW Country Eagles	Endeavour Oval (Note: The venue for the Round 5 fixture between NSW Country Eagles and Perth Spirit was moved from Orange due to heavy rains causing Endeavour Oval to become waterlogged. The match was relocated to Concord Oval in Sydney.)	3,000	Orange
NSW	NSW Country Eagles	Magpies Rugby Park	3,000	Tamworth
NSW	NSW Country Eagles	Scully Park	11,000	Tamworth
NSW	NSW Country Eagles	Sports Ground No. 2	5,000	Newcastle
NSW	NSW Country Eagles	Sydney University	5,000	Sydney
NSW	Sydney Rays	North Sydney Oval	20,000	Sydney
NSW	Sydney Rays	Pittwater Park	10,000	Sydney
NSW	Western Sydney Rams	Concord Oval	20,000	Sydney
QLD	Brisbane City	Ballymore	18,000	Brisbane
QLD	Queensland Country	Bond University, Gold Coast	5,000	Gold Coast
QLD	Queensland Country	Sports Ground	9,000	Toowoomba
VIC	Melbourne Rising	Holmesglen Reserve	3,000	Melbourne
VIC	Melbourne Rising	Frankston Park	8,000	Melbourne
WA	Perth Spirit	UWA Rugby Club	4,000	Perth

== Television coverage and streaming ==
Two of the NRC matches each weekend were broadcast live via Fox Sports, with the other matches shown on the Fox Sports streaming platform. Discussion of the NRC competition was included on Fox Sports' review show NRC Extra Time on Monday nights, and the Rugby 360 program on Wednesday evenings.

== Experimental Law Variations ==
The most significant new law variation adopted for the 2016 season was the further change in point scoring values, with tries made worth six points and any form of goal worth two points.

Two of the scrum law variations trialed since the inaugural season of the National Rugby Championship in 2014 were adopted (along with other minor amendments) into World Rugby's laws in 2016 and were thus no longer law variations. These changes to Law 20.1(d) and Law 20.12(c) sanctioned against delay in forming a scrum, and against a scrum half whose team has not won the ball stepping onto the space between the position flanker and No. 8 while the ball is in the scrum.

The other law variations used in 2014 and 2015, were retained for the 2016 season.

NRC Law Variations 2016

Existing Law of the Game	Variation
Law 5.7(e); If time expires and the ball is not dead, or an awarded scrum or lineout has not been completed, the referee allows play to continue until the next time that the ball becomes dead. The ball becomes dead when the referee would have awarded a scrum, lineout, an option to the non-infringing team, drop out or after a conversion or successful penalty kick at goal. If a scrum has to be reset, the scrum has not been completed. If time expires and a mark, free kick or penalty kick is then awarded, the referee allows play to continue.	Non-offending team is allowed to kick the ball into touch after being awarded a penalty kick, which has been blown after time expires, and the lineout will take place.
Law 9.A.1; Value of a Try - 5 points Value of a Penalty goal - 3 points Value of a Dropped goal - 3 points	Value of a Try - 6 points Value of a Penalty goal - 2 points Value of a Dropped goal - 2 points Also being trialled in New Zealand's Heartland Championship in 2016.
Law 9.B.1(e); The kicker must take the kick within one minute and thirty seconds (ninety seconds) from the time a try has been awarded. The player must take the kick within one minute and thirty seconds even if the ball rolls over and has to be placed again.	Time limit reduced to 60 seconds for conversion kicks, and 45 seconds for penalty kicks.
Law 17.2(d); Keeping players on their feet. Players in a maul must endeavour to stay on their feet. The ball carrier in a maul may go to ground providing the ball is available immediately and play continues.	Greater policing of this law, in order to discourage "hold up tackles", by ensuring that the tackler, who holds up a ball carrier in an effort to form a maul, does not collapse the maul as soon as it has formed.
Law 19.2(d); For a quick throw-in, the player must use the ball that went into touch. A quick throw-in is not permitted if another person has touched the ball apart from the player throwing it in and an opponent who carried it into touch. The same team throws into the lineout.	Players will be allowed to take quick throw-ins regardless of whether someone else has touched the ball
Law 19.6; The player taking the throw-in must stand at the correct place. The player must not step into the field of play when the ball is thrown. The ball must be thrown straight, so that it travels at least 5 metres along the line of touch before it first touches the ground or touches or is touched by a player.	Latitude will be given to the throwing team if the opposing team does not compete for the ball near where the ball is received
Law 21.2(a); The kicker must take the penalty or free kick at the mark or anywhere behind it on a line through the mark.	Increased latitude will be given to where penalty and free kicks are to be taken
Competition rule - Bonus point awarded for scoring 4 tries	Bonus point awarded if winning team scores 3 or more tries than their opponents. This particular system has been used in France's professional leagues since the 2007–08 northern hemisphere season.
Television match official protocols	Television match official to only be consulted about tries and in-goal plays.

== Regular season ==
The eight teams compete in a round-robin tournament for the regular season. Each team has four matches at home and four away. The top four teams qualify for the title play-offs with semi-finals and finals.

During this section of the tournament, teams can also play for the Horan-Little Shield, a challenge trophy that is played for when a challenge is accepted or offered by the holders.

=== Standings ===
National Rugby Championship
Pos	Team	P	W	D	L	PF	PA	PD	TB	LB	Pts
1	NSW Country Eagles HL	7	6	0	1	280	190	+90	3	1	28
2	Sydney Rays	7	6	0	1	258	174	+84	3	0	27
3	Perth Spirit	7	5	0	2	250	210	+40	2	0	22
4	Melbourne Rising	7	3	0	4	260	262	−2	1	3	16
5	Canberra Vikings	7	3	0	4	254	276	−22	2	1	15
6	Western Sydney Rams	7	2	0	5	264	266	−2	1	4	13
7	Brisbane City	7	2	0	5	216	306	−90	0	1	9
8	Queensland Country	7	1	0	6	248	346	−98	0	3	7
Updated: 9 October 2016 Source: rugbyarchive.net • Teams 1 to 4 (Green background) at the end of the preliminary competition rounds qualify for the Title play-offs. HL denotes the holder of the Horan-Little Shield.
Four points for a win, two for a draw, and no points for a bye. One bonus point for the winning team scoring three or more tries than their opponent (TB), one bonus point for losing by eight or less (LB). If teams are level on points in the standings at any stage, tiebreakers are applied in the following order: (Note: McKay, Brett. "NRC tie breaker method". Green and Gold Rugby.) • Difference between points for and against • Match result between tied teams • Total number of tries scored in the competition

=== Competition rounds ===
==== Round 1 ====
27 August 2016	Perth Spirit	20–16	Melbourne Rising BP	McGillivray Oval, Perth
11:00	Try: Morahan (2) 48', 67'; Havili 5'; Con: Lance (1/3) 67'		Try: Jeffries 38'; Reid 56'; Con: Debreczeni (2/2) 39', 57'	Attendance: 600; Referee: Graham Cooper

27 August 2016	NSW Country Eagles	22–12	Brisbane City	Uni Rugby Field, Sydney
15:00	Try: Hanigan 26'; Newsome 40'; Needs 43'; Con: Deegan (2/3) 27', 40'; Cards: Needs (yellow card) 52' to 62'; Hanigan (yellow card) 69' to 79'		Try: Strachan 38'; Beauchamp 52'; Con: Russell (0/1); Strachan (0/1); Cards: Ready (yellow card) 6' to 16'; L. Tui (yellow card) 28' to 38'	Referee: Angus Gardner

28 August 2016	BP Sydney Rays	50–30	Western Sydney Rams	North Sydney Oval, Sydney
13:00	Try: Woolf (2) 4', 80'; Fitzpatrick 11'; Jones 14', Dempsey 32'; Simone 36', Roos 70'; Con: Sinclair (4/7) 5', 12', 15', 33'; Cards: Dempsey (yellow card) 49' to 59' (yellow-red card) 74' to 80'		Try: Paenga-Amosa (2) 17', 28'; Tufui 49'; Allen 58'; Con: Asquith (3/3) 29', 50', 59'; Nikoro (0/1); Cards: Payne (yellow card) 64' to 74'	Referee: Will Houston

28 August 2016	Queensland Country	20–58	Canberra Vikings BP	Bond University, Gold Coast
15:00	Try: Banks (2) 72', 74'; Perese 61'; Con: Mason (1/3) 75'		Try: Dargaville (2) 6', 27'; Arnold (2) 19', 50'; Speight (2) 68', 80'; Abel 30'; Jackson-Hope 76'; Con: Jooste (5/8) 6', 28', 51', 68', 77'	Referee: Nic Berry

==== Round 2 ====
1 September 2016	BP Sydney Rays	28–8	Perth Spirit	North Sydney Oval, Sydney
16:30	Try: Jones 23'; Wileman 49'; Fitzpatrick 64'; Luxton 75'; Con: Lucas (2/4)49', 64'		Try: Louwrens 4'; Con: Lance (1/1) 5'; Cards: Stringer (yellow card) 34' to 44'; Vasukicakau (yellow card) 54' to 64'; May (yellow card) 64' to 74'; Alatimu (yellow card) 80' to 80+1'	Referee: Angus Gardner

Horan-Little Challenge	3 September 2016	Brisbane City	44–36	Western Sydney Rams BP	Ballymore, Brisbane
	15:00	Try: Felsman (2) 61', 71; Gibbon 12', Tui 22'; Talakai 35', Houston 42'; Con: McIntyre (3/4) 23', 35', 43'; Felsman (1/1) 63'; James (0/1); Cards: Gunn (yellow card) 31' to 41'; Houston (yellow card) 51' to 61'; Ready (yellow card) 65' to 75'		Try: Paenga-Amosa 6'; Gale 30'; Smart 40'; Viiga 52'; Kei 66'; Con: Asquith (3/5) 31', 52', 67'; Cards: Skelton (yellow card) 33' to 43'	Referee: Ed Martin

4 September 2016	Melbourne Rising	46–32	Queensland Country	Holmesglen Reserve, Melbourne
13:00	Try: English 5'; Leafa 32'; Meehan 48'; Timani 55'; Tuimalealiifano 58'; Tuipulotu 73'; Con: Meehan (5/5) 5', 32', 49', 56', 75'; Debreczeni (0/1); Cards: Reid (yellow card) 7' to 17'; Toolis (yellow card) 78' to 80+2'		Try: Simmons 9'; Rodda 12'; Perese 17'; Mitchell 40'; Con: Mason (4/4) 10', 13', 18', 40'	Referee: Rohan Hoffmann

4 September 2016	Canberra Vikings	28–60	NSW Country Eagles BP	Viking Park, Canberra
15:00	Try: A. Robinson (2) 67', 75'; Smith 65'; Arnold 80'; Con: Jooste (2/4) 65', 76'; Cards: Coleman (yellow card) 7' to 17'		Try: Newsome (2) 3', 61'; Perry (2) 9', 50'; Ward 23', Hanigan 29'; Godwin 46', R. Robinson 57'; Con: Deegan (5/7) 4', 10', 30' 48', 58'; Adams (1/1) 61'; Cards: Newsome (yellow card) 63' to 73'; Fainga'a (yellow card) 63' to 73'; Perry (yellow card) 80' to 80+1'	Referee: Graham Cooper

==== Round 3 ====
10 September 2016	BP Western Sydney Rams	24–30	Perth Spirit	Concord Oval, Sydney
13:00	Try: Toleafoa 25'; Paenga-Amosa 30'; Payne 65'; Con: Asquith (3/3) 26', 31', 67'; Cards: Toleafoa (yellow card) 11' to 21'		Try: Lance 14'; Matuauto 22', Vasukicakau 32'; Louwrens 40'; Con: Lance (3/4) 14', 33', 40'; Cards: Havilli (yellow card) 74' to 80'	Referee: Ed Martin

10 September 2016	BP Queensland Country	22–30	Sydney Rays	Bond University, Gold Coast
15:00	Try: Perese 27'; Third 65', Banks 78'; Con: Tuttle (1/1) 28'; Third (1/2) 66'		Try: Woolf (2) 35', 47'; Palmer 40', Brown 58'; Con: Lucas (3/4) 37', 40', 59'; Cards: Sinclair (yellow card) 9' to 19'; Bergelin (yellow card) 65' to 75'	Referee: Jordan Way

Horan-Little Challenge	11 September 2016	Brisbane City	20–52	Canberra Vikings BP	Ballymore, Brisbane
	13:00	Try: Naisarani 3'; Frisby 16'; Kuridrani 37'; Con: McIntyre (1/3) 38'; Cards: Kuridrani (yellow card) 66' to 76'		Try: Abel (2) 10', 45'; Noa 22', Robinson 27'; Butler 66', Carter 74'; Speight 78'; Con: Thompson (3/4) 23', 27', 46'; Jooste (2/3) 76' 79'	Referee: Nic Berry

11 September 2016	NSW Country Eagles	32–30	Melbourne Rising BP	Rugby Park, Tamworth
15:00	Try: Latu 20'; Figg 23', Hanigan 31'; Gordon 33'; Con: Deegan (4/4) 21', 24', 31', 34'; Cards: Newsome (yellow card) 74' to 80'		Try: Meehan 27'; Snowden 43'; Silafai-Leaana 63'; R. Leota 78'; Con: Debreczeni (3/4) 27', 44', 79'	Referee: Will Houston

==== Round 4 ====
17 September 2016	Sydney Rays	16–36	NSW Country Eagles BP	Pittwater Park, Sydney
13:00	Try: Vest 4'; Penalty try 57'; Con: Lucas (1/1) 5'; Sinclair (1/1) 57'		Try: Robinson (2) 40', 49'; Latu 20', Cusack 80'; Gordon 81'; Con: Deegan (2/3) 21', 51'; Adams (1/2) 80'; Cards: Latu (yellow card) 55' to 65'; Fainga'a (yellow card) 67' to 77'	Attendance: 1,500; Referee: Rohan Hoffmann

17 September 2016	Melbourne Rising	46–28	Brisbane City	Holmesglen Reserve, Melbourne
15:00	Try: Debreczeni (2) 19', 80'; Tupai 8', Reid 12'; Placid 32', Fox 72'; Con: Debreczeni (1/2) 13'; Meehan (4/4) 20', 33', 73', 80'; Cards: Tupai (yellow card) 37' to 47'; English (yellow card) 53' to 63'		Try: Naisarani (2) 29', 35'; White 58'; James 76'; Con: McIntyre (1/3) 30'; James (1/1) 76'; Cards: James (yellow card) 16' to 26'	Referee: Ed Martin

Horan-Little Challenge	18 September 2016	Canberra Vikings	22–16	Western Sydney Rams BP	Viking Park, Canberra
	13:00	Try: Taliauli 31'; Tuala 40', McInerney 70'; Con: Jooste (2/3) 40', 71		Try: Latunipulu 18'; Toleafoa 36'; Con: Asquith (2/2) 18', 37'	Referee: Amy Perrett

18 September 2016	BP Perth Spirit	66–36	Queensland Country	McGillivray Oval, Perth
13:00	Try: Morahan (3) 31', 70', 75'; R. Haylett-Petty (2) 38', 40'; Vui 26', Louwrens 42'; Brache 46', Matuauto 79; Con: Lance (6/9) 27', 32', 40', 43', 47', 71'. Cards: Stringer (yellow card) 55' to 65'		Try: Kaitu'u 56'; Paia'aua 59'; Cornelsen 62'; Mason 74'; Banks 82'; Con: Third (1/1) 57'; Mason (2/4) 63', 74'	Referee: Jordan Way

==== Round 5 ====
24 September 2016	BP NSW Country Eagles	48–24	Perth Spirit	Concord Oval, Sydney
13:00	Try: Gordon (3) 16', 29', 46'; R. Robinson 19'; Godwin 67', Hanigan 83'; Con: Adams (6/6) 17', 20', 47', 68', 84'; Cards: Fainga'a (yellow card) 10' to 20'; Croke (yellow card) 69' to 79'		Try: Tapuai 26'; Eden 32'; Matuauto 62'; Con: Lance (3/3) 27', 33', 64'	Attendance: 2,000; Referee: Nic Berry

24 September 2016	Western Sydney Rams	50–46	Queensland Country BP	Concord Oval, Sydney
15:00	Try: Smart (2) 22', 80'; Viiga 15', Asquith 37'; Paenga-Amosa 44'; Latunipulu 62'; Penalty Try 87'; Con: Asquith (2/4) 37', 45'; Walton (2/3) 63', 88'		Try: McNamara 5'; Banks 17', Pincus 20'; Casey 31', Scott-Young 33'; Jones 53'; Con: Mason (5/6) 18', 21', 31', 34', 54'; Cards: Jones (yellow card) 80+2' to 80+8'	Attendance: 2,000; Referee: Amy Perrett

Horan-Little Challenge	25 September 2016	Canberra Vikings	44–60	Melbourne Rising BP	Viking Park, Canberra
	13:00	Try: Mann-Rea (3) 36', 40', 51'; Staniforth 47', Carter 56'; Thompson 73'; Con: Thompson (4/6) 47', 52', 56', 73'; Cards: Taliauli (yellow card) 64' to 74'		Try: English (3) 14, 44', 69'; Johansson (2) 53', 59', Jeffries 23'; Debreczeni 32', Toolis 67'; Tuipulotu 80'; Con: Debreczeni(3/9) 33', 60', 70'	Referee: Graham Cooper

25 September 2016	BP Brisbane City	32–38	Sydney Rays	Ballymore, Brisbane
15:00	Try: Sorovi 9'; McIntyre 28'; L. Tui 49'; Lacey 64'; Tupou 71'; Con: McIntyre (1/5) 50'		Try: Simone (2) 22', 33'; Dempsey 38', Turner 55'; Alcock 67'; Con: Lucas (3/4) 23', 33', 39'; Sinclair (1/1) 68'; Cards: Fitzpatrick (yellow card) 69' to 79'	Referee: Will Houston

==== Round 6 ====
1 October 2016	Queensland Country	40–38	NSW Country Eagles BP	Sports Ground, Toowoomba
13:00 AEST	Try: Paia’aua (2) 44', 49'; Scott-Young 4', Postal 25'; Casey 38', Asiata 70'; Con: Mason (2/5) 26', 45'; Third (0/1)		Try: Hill (2) 15', 73'; Kagiassis 17', L. Holmes 54'; Godwin 59'; Con: Deegan (4/5) 17', 55', 60', 74'	Referee: Damon Murphy

1 October 2016	BP Sydney Rays	58–14	Canberra Vikings	Pittwater Park, Sydney
15:00 AEST	Try: Fitzpatrick (2) 20', 25'; Jones (2) 22', 79', Turner (2) 28', 40'; Wells 8', Sinclair 54'; Con: Lucas (5/7) 9', 20', 26', 29', 40'; Sinclair (0/1); Cards: Alcock (yellow card) 71' to 80+1'		Try: Smiler 32'; McInerney 61'; Con: Jooste (1/1) 33'; Horan (0/1)	Attendance: 1,200; Referee: Nic Berry

Horan-Little Challenge	2 October 2016	Melbourne Rising	30–68	Western Sydney Rams BP	Holmesglen Reserve, Melbourne
	15:00 AEDT	Try: Tuipulotu (2) 41', 50'; Snowden 16', Leafa 22'; Con: Debreczeni (3/4) 17', 23', 51'; Cards: Johansson (yellow card) 32' to 42'; Toolis (yellow card) 60' to 70'; Debreczeni (yellow card) 67' to 77'		Try: Viiga (3) 9', 40', 67'; Sopoaga 19', Asquith 30'; Walton 33', Lolohea 45'; Nikoro 62', Taupou 79'; Con: Asquith (7/9) 10', 30', 34', 40', 46', 68', 80'; Cards: Smart (yellow card) 49' to 59'	Referee: Ed Martin

2 October 2016	BP Perth Spirit	60–22	Brisbane City	McGillivray Oval, Perth
14:00 AWST	Try: Hardwick (2) 40', 64'; McCalman (2) 51', 60', Tessmann 15'; Brache 33', Masirewa 55'; Eden 76', R. Haylett-Petty 79'; Con: Prior (1/6) 16'; Eden (1/1) 65'; Alatimu (1/2) 76'; Cards: Louwrens (yellow card) 10' to 20'		Try: McIntyre 11'; Felsman 29', Lacey 67'; Con: McIntyre (2/3) 12', 30'; Cards: Sorovi (yellow card) 39' to 49'; Sooaemalelagi (yellow card) 48' to 58'; L. Tui (yellow card) 51' to 61'	Attendance: 400; Referee: Rohan Hoffmann

==== Round 7 ====
Horan-Little Challenge	8 October 2016	BP Western Sydney Rams	40–44	NSW Country Eagles	Concord Oval, Sydney
	13:00 AEDT	Try: Viiga (2) 8' 26'; Wessels 22', Paenga-Amosa 48'; Smart 64', Minute 72'; Con: Asquith (2/6) 23', 64'; Cards: Viiga (yellow card) 68' to 78'		Try: Gordon (2) 44', 69'; R. Robinson 16', Fainga'a 31'; Ward 33', Ryan 76'; Con: Deegan (2/4) 32', 34'; Adams (2/2) 69', 77'; Cards: Figg (yellow card) 21' to 31'	Attendance: 3,000+ Referee: Graham Cooper

8 October 2016	BP Canberra Vikings	36–42	Perth Spirit	Viking Park, Canberra
15:00 AEDT	Try: Mann-Rae (2) 27', 63'; Taliauli 9', Sinoti 17'; Thompson 78'; Con: Thompson (3/4) 10', 18', 79'; Horan (0/1)		Try: Stander (2) 21', 55'; Vasukicakau 37', Louwrens 48'; Meakes 66'; Con: Lance (1/1) 22'; Prior (3/3) 38', 49', 56'; Alatimu (1/1) 67'; Pen: Alatimu (1/1) 80'	Referee: Will Houston

9 October 2016	BP Melbourne Rising	38–32	Sydney Rays	Frankston Park, Melbourne
13:00 AEDT	Try: Placid 12'; Cummins 17', Lomax 44'; English 76'; Con: Johansson (3/3) 13', 18', 45'; Snowden (1/1) 77'		Try: Dempsey 4'; Foley 6', Roos 19'; Jones 28', Simone 38'; Con: Sinclair (4/5) 5', 20', 29', 39'	Referee: Nic Berry

9 October 2016	Brisbane City	58–52	Queensland Country BP	Ballymore, Brisbane
14:00 AEST	Try: White (2) 4', 12'; Naisarani (2) 46', 56', Gibbon (2) 65', 73'; Beauchamp 17', Kuridrani 21'; Con: McIntyre (5/8) 12', 18', 47', 58', 66'; Cards: Paraka (yellow card) 61' to 71'		Try: Tuttle (2) 36', 62'; Postal 9', Tupou 26'; Perese 60', Lefau 76'; Banks 78'; Con: Third (0/1); Paia’aua (5/6) 27', 37', 61', 63', 79'; Cards: Tupou (yellow card) 49' to 59'	Attendance: 3,000+ Referee: Damon Murphy

== Title play-offs ==
The top four sides in the regular season advanced to the semifinals of the knock-out stage, which was followed by the final to decide the National Rugby Championship title.

=== Semi-finals ===
15 October 2016	NSW Country Eagles	50–24	Melbourne Rising	Sports Ground No. 2, Newcastle
15:00 AEDT	Try: Figg (2) 12', 37'; Robinson (2) 28', 31'; Gordon (2) 60', 80'; O'Regan 50'; Con: Deegan (3/6) 13', 29', 50, Adams (1/1) 80'		Try: Naivalu 2'; Leafa 7'; Reid 64'; Con: Debreczeni (3/3) 3', 8', 65'	Referee: Graham Cooper

16 October 2016	Sydney Rays	24–42	Perth Spirit	Pittwater Park, Sydney
15:00 AEDT	Try: Fitzpatrick 8'; Jones 10'; Woolf 71; Con: Lucas (2/2) 9', 11'; Sinclair (1/1) 72'; Cards: Dempsey (yellow card) 51' to 61'		Try: Prior (2) 33', 43'; Masirewa 15', Brache 21'; Tessmann 51', Rangi 75'; Con: Prior (3/6) 22', 43', 53'; Cards: Meakes (yellow card) 48' to 58'	Referee: Will Houston

=== Final ===
22 October 2016	NSW Country Eagles	16–20	Perth Spirit	Scully Park, Tamworth
19:45 AEDT	Try: Figg 37'; Hill 75'; Con: Deegan (1/1) 37'; Adams (1/1) 75'; Cards: Perry (yellow card) 43' to 53'		Try: Louwrens (2) 33', 44'; Morahan 31'; Con: Tapuai (1/1) 45'; Lance (0/2); Cards: Cowan (yellow card) 48' to 58'; Stander (yellow card) 64' to 74'	Referee: Nic Berry

NSW Country	Perth Spirit

== Players ==
The leading scorers in 2016 over the regular season and finals combined were:

== See also ==
- Australian Rugby Championship (predecessor tournament)
- Super Rugby
