= Andrew Deegan =

Australian rugby union footballer

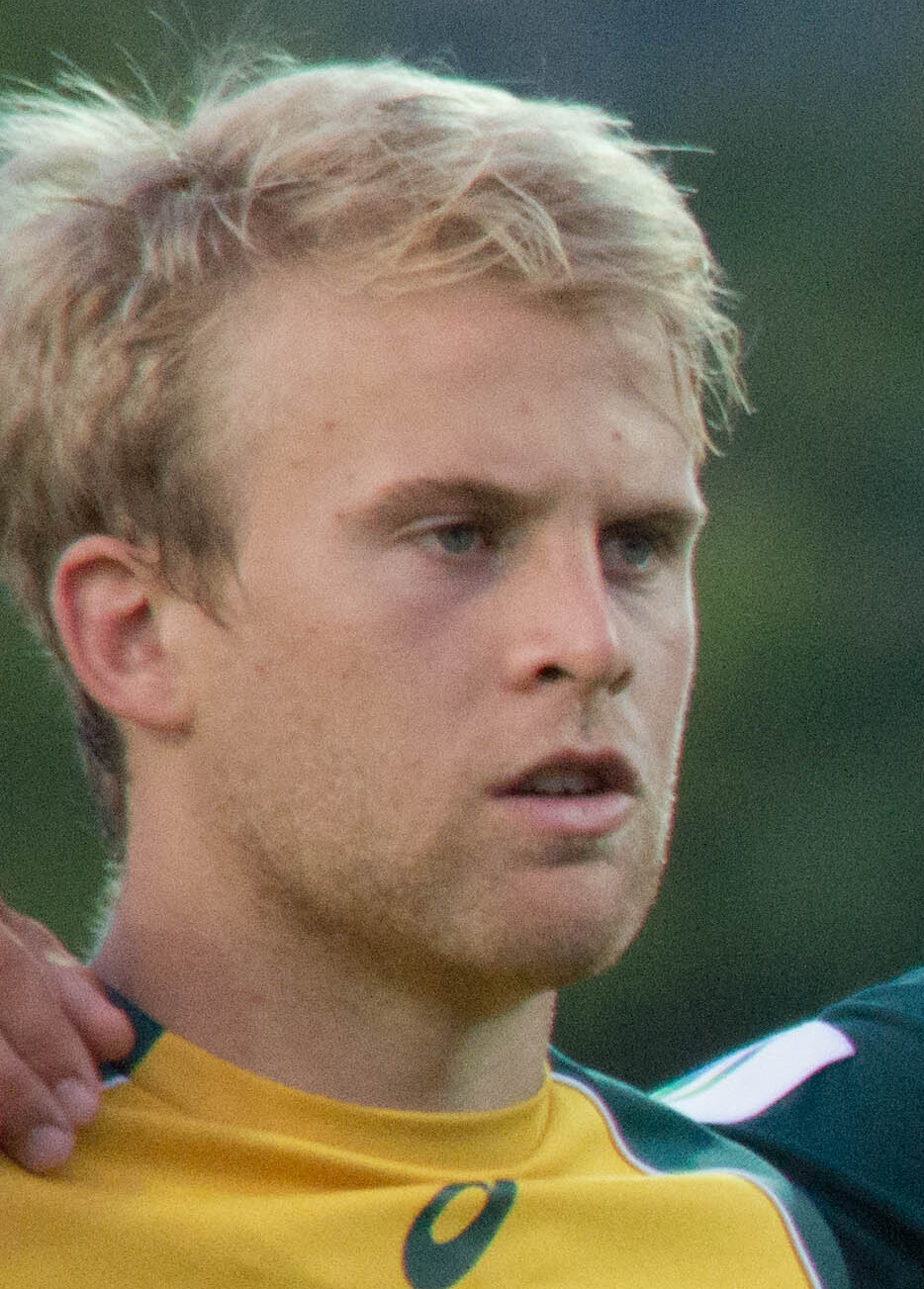
- Deegan in 2015
- Born: Andrew Deegan; 23 March 1995 (age 31) St Leonards, New South Wales, Australia
- Height: 1.77 m (5 ft 9 1/2 in)
- Weight: 86 kg (13 st 8 lb)
- School: St Joseph's College, Hunters Hill

Rugby union career
- Position: Fly-half
Senior career
Years	Team	Apps	(Points)
2017–2018	Connacht	2	(18)
2021–2023	Kurita Water Gush	26	(223)
2023	Tokyo gas rugby club	6	(0)
- Correct as of 29 September 2020
Provincial / State sides
Years	Team	Apps	(Points)
2014−2017	Randwick	45	(418)
2016	NSW Country Eagles	9	(56)
2018–2019	Western Force	16	(76)
- Correct as of 29 September 2020
Super Rugby
Years	Team	Apps	(Points)
2016–2017	Waratahs	0	(0)
2020	Rebels	9	(14)
- Correct as of 29 September 2020
International career
Years	Team	Apps	(Points)
2013	Australia Schoolboys		
2015	Australia U20		

Andrew Deegan (born 23 March 1995) is an Australian rugby union footballer who plays for Global Rapid Rugby side Western Force. He plays as a fly-half.

== Career ==
Deegan made his Shute Shield for Randwick in 2014. The previous year, he had represented the Australia Schoolboys national team and, in 2015, he gained further international honours when selected for the Australia Under-20s team. In 2016, he scored 194 points, including 5 tries, in 18 games for Randwick, winning the Roscoe Fay Trophy for highest points scorer. Deegan was also part of the NSW Country Eagles team that finished as runners-up in the 2016 National Rugby Championship. In 2016, he was added as a supplementary squad player to the Waratahs Super Rugby squad.

In August 2017, Irish provincial team Connacht announced that they had signed Deegan ahead of the 2017–18 Pro14 season.

== Super Rugby statistics ==
As of 12 September 2020

Season	Team	Games	Starts	Sub	Mins	Tries	Cons	Pens	Drops	Points	Yel	Red
2016	Waratahs	0	0	0	0	0	0	0	0	0	0	0
2017	Waratahs	0	0	0	0	0	0	0	0	0	0	0
2020	Rebels	3	1	2	92	1	3	1	0	14	0	0
2020 AU	Rebels	6	3	3	314	0	0	0	0	0	0	0
Total		9	4	5	406	1	3	1	0	14	0	0
