= Thierry Kounga Kuaté =

- Full name: Thierry Marcial Kounga Kuaté
- Born: 15 June 1994 (age 32) Bandjoun, Cameroon
- Height: 1.76 m (5 ft 9 1/2 in)

Rugby union career
- Position: Prop
Amateur team(s)
Years	Team	Apps	(Points)
2013	Raiders	4	(0)
Senior career
Years	Team	Apps	(Points)
2014	Falcons	2	(0)
2015	Waratahs	0	(0)
2015	NSW Country Eagles	5	(0)
2016–2017	Carcassonne	0	(0)
2017	Sharks XV	5	(0)
2017	Sharks	1	(0)
- Correct as of 8 April 2018
International career
Years	Team	Apps	(Points)
2010	Cameroon	1	(0)
- Correct as of 8 April 2018

Thierry Marcial Kounga Kuaté (born 15 June 1994) is a Cameroonian rugby union player who most recently played for the Sharks in the Currie Cup. His regular position is prop.

In 2013 and 2014, he played club rugby and provincial rugby in South Africa, where he was generally known as David Kuate. He was then contracted to the Waratahs in Australia, where he was nicknamed Darche, Darcheville or Dashville after French Guianan footballer Jean-Claude Darcheville, before signing with French club Carcassonne for 2016 and 2017.

== Professional career ==
=== Raiders / Falcons ===
Kounga Kuaté was born in Bandjoun, Cameroon. He left Cameroon in 2012 to journey to South Africa, where he settled in Johannesburg, where he joined club side Raiders. He represented them in the 2013 SARU Community Cup, making four appearances as they finished third in Pool C of the competition.

In 2014, he had a trial at Nelspruit-based side the Pumas and featured for them in a pre-season friendly, but instead joined Kempton Park-based side the Falcons. He made his first class debut for the Falcons against the Pumas, playing off the bench in a 6–26 defeat in the opening round of the 2014 Vodacom Cup, and also started their next home match of the competition, a 29–40 defeat to the Leopards.

=== Waratahs / Eagles ===
When Australian Super Rugby side the Waratahs toured South Africa in March 2014 during the 2014 Super Rugby season, Kounga Kuaté was invited to train with the side and joined the team for the remainder of their South African tour in Durban and Cape Town. Waratahs coach Michael Cheika offered Kounga Kuaté a contract to play with the Waratahs and, despite a difficult visa application process and a contract offer from the Sharks, he accepted the offer and made the move to Sydney, joining the Randwick club for the Shute Shield competition.

He appeared for the Waratahs' Gen Blue side during the 2014 Pacific Rugby Cup in their match against Argentine side Pampas XV.

=== Carcassonne ===
He agreed a two-year deal in 2016 to play for French club Carcassonne.

== Cameroon ==
Kounga Kuaté has represented Cameroon, playing for them in a match against Gabon.
