= Sam Figg =

Australian rugby union player

- Born: May 7, 1992 (age 34) Johannesburg, South Africa
- Height: 6 ft 4 in (1.93 m)
- Weight: 220 lb (100 kg)
- School: Barker College, Sydney

Rugby union career
- Position(s): Flanker, No. 8
Amateur team(s)
Years	Team	Apps	(Points)
2013	Northern Suburbs	12	(0)
2014–2017	Randwick	31	(55)
Senior career
Years	Team	Apps	(Points)
2015–2018	NSW Country Eagles	22	(44)
2017	Mazda Blue Zoomers	8	(30)
2018	Glendale Raptors	9	(15)
National sevens team
Years	Team		Comps
2013–2018	Australia		7

Sam Figg (born 7 May 1992) is a South African born Australian professional rugby union player. He plays as a back row for the Glendale Raptors in Major League Rugby.
