= Robert Taylor (rugby union coach) =

Australian rugby union coach

- Born: Auckland, New Zealand

Rugby union career
- Position: Assistant coach
- Current team: Melbourne Rebels
Coaching career
- Years: Team
- 2009–2016: Auckland University RFC
- 2016–2020: Sydney University
- 2019–2020: NSW Country Eagles
- 2020-2021: Leicester Tigers
- 2021–2023: NEC Green Rockets
- 2023–2024: Melbourne Rebels

Robert Taylor is a professionalRugby unioncoach from New Zealand, who has coached in three different competitions; English Premiership, Japan Rugby League One and Super Rugby. His most recent role was as an Assistant Coach at Super Rugby team Melbourne Rebels for the 2024 Season. He has also been a Head Coach of NEC Green Rockets in the Japan Rugby League One competition under Director of Rugby Michael Cheika. He was an Assistant coach at Leicester Tigers under now England coach Steve Borthwick.

In Australia he was head coach of the Sydney University Football Club winning back to back Shute Shield championships in 2018 & 2019 as well as the Australian Club Championship in 2020 before leaving to Leicester Tigers He was the head coach of the 2019 NSW Country Eagles team that played in the NRC competition. Robert was the Director of Rugby at Auckland University RFC and coached the Auckland NPC B team Auckland.
