= Nick Jooste =

Australian rugby union player

- Full name: Nicholas Jooste
- Born: 7 July 1997 (age 29) Perth, Western Australia
- Height: 1.94 m (6 ft 4 in)
- Weight: 98 kg (15 st 6 lb; 216 lb)
- School: Hale School

Rugby union career
- Position(s): Fly-half, Inside Centre, Fullback
- Current team: Red Hurricanes Osaka
Senior career
Years	Team	Apps	(Points)
2015 2017	Perth Spirit	9	(10)
2016	Canberra Vikings	7	(0)
2018	Kamaishi Seawaves	8	(8)
2024	Tokyo Gas Rugby Club	6	(88)
2025	San Diego Legion		
2025-	Red Hurricanes Osaka	11	(16)
- Correct as of 8 June 2024
Super Rugby
Years	Team	Apps	(Points)
2016–2017	Brumbies	0	(0)
2019-2020	Force	9	(15)
2022-2024	Rebels	27	(26)
International career
Years	Team	Apps	(Points)
2015	Australia Schoolboys		
2016–2017	Australia U20	7	(7)
- Correct as of 2 March 2022

Nick Jooste (born 7 July 1997) is an Australian Rugby Union player who currently plays for the San Diego Legion in Major League Rugby. He previously played for Rebels, Force and Brumbies in the Super Rugby competition, and also the UC Vikings. His regular playing position is fly-half.

== Rugby career ==
Jooste turned out for both Australian Schools Barbarians and Australia Schoolboys in 2015 and later in the year became just the sixth Australian player to earn a Super Rugby contract whilst still in high school. The others were Kurtley Beale, Quade Cooper, James O'Connor, Luke Jones and Chris Feauai-Sautia.

He did not make a competitive appearance for the Brumbies in Super Rugby and joined Western Force in 2019 and later joined Melbourne Rebels.

Jooste signed with San Diego Legion for the 2025 Major League Rugby season.

== Super Rugby statistics ==
As of 3 June 2023

Season	Team	Games	Starts	Sub	Mins	Tries	Cons	Pens	Drops	Points	Yel	Red
2016	Brumbies	0	0	0	0	0	0	0	0	0	0	0
2017	Brumbies	0	0	0	0	0	0	0	0	0	0	0
2020 AU	Force	2	2	0	118	0	0	0	0	0	0	0
2022	Rebels	5	1	4	131	1	0	0	0	5	0	0
2023	Rebels	10	4	6	356	2	0	0	0	10	0	0
Total		17	7	10	605	3	0	0	0	15	0	0
