= Ned Hanigan =

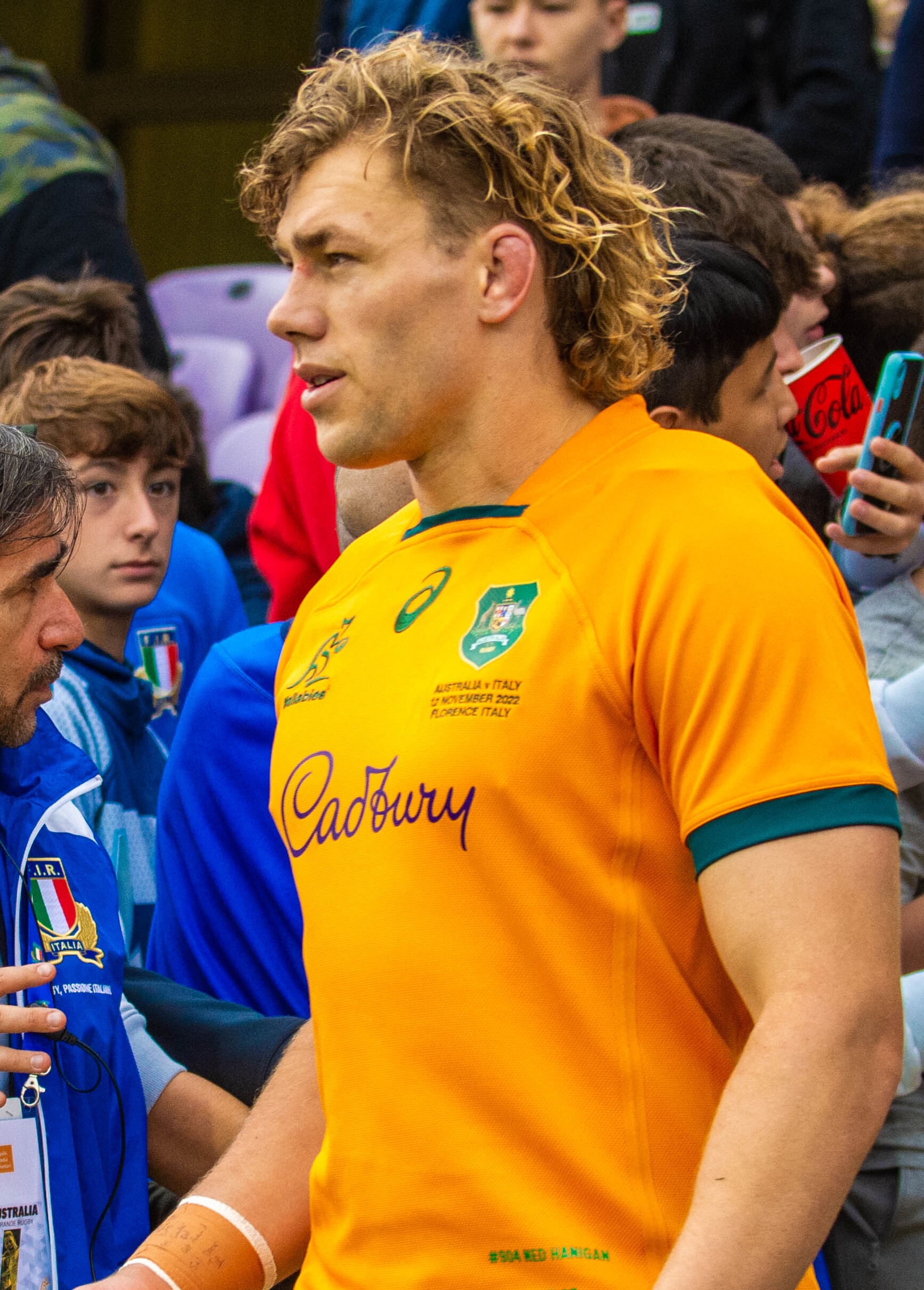
- Hanigan with Australia in 2022
- Full name: Ned Michael Hanigan
- Born: 11 April 1995 (age 31) Dubbo, New South Wales, Australia
- Height: 1.96 m (6 ft 5 in)
- Weight: 114.3 kg (18 st 0 lb; 252 lb)
- School: St Joseph's College, Hunters Hill
- University: University of New South Wales

Rugby union career
- Position(s): Flanker, No. 8, Lock
- Current team: Provence
Amateur team(s)
Years	Team	Apps	(Points)
2013−	Randwick	25	(35)
Senior career
Years	Team	Apps	(Points)
2015–2019	NSW Country Eagles	15	(24)
2016–2020	Waratahs	68	(40)
2021–2022	Kurita Water Gush	8	(10)
2022–2024	Waratahs	18	(5)
2024–	Provence	6	(10)
- Correct as of 14 February 2025
International career
Years	Team	Apps	(Points)
2013	Australia Schoolboys		
2015	Australia U20	5	(0)
2017–	Australia	34	(0)
2023	Australia A	2	(5)
- Correct as of 26 August 2023

Ned Hanigan (born 11 April 1996) is an Australian retired professional rugby union player who most recently played for Provence in the French Pro D2 competition. He mostly played as a blindside flanker or lock.

== Early life and career ==
Hanigan was born in Dubbo, Central New South Wales and raised in Coonamble in the Central West of New South Wales. After high school, he began studying science at University of New South Wales (UNSW) alongside Shute Shield rugby with Randwick, winning Premiership Rugby title with their Colts side before progressing on to their first team. During this time, he also represented New South Wales at Under-20 level in 2014 and 2015 and played for the New South Wales Country Eagles during the 2015 National Rugby Championship.

== Professional career ==
Hanigan trained with the Waratahs wider training group in 2015 and then made the full squad ahead of the 2016 Super Rugby season. As a youngster competing against Wallaby internationals such as Dean Mumm, Will Skelton and Dave Dennis for a starting place, Hanigan's game time was limited to just 3 substitute appearances in his debut season.

== International ==
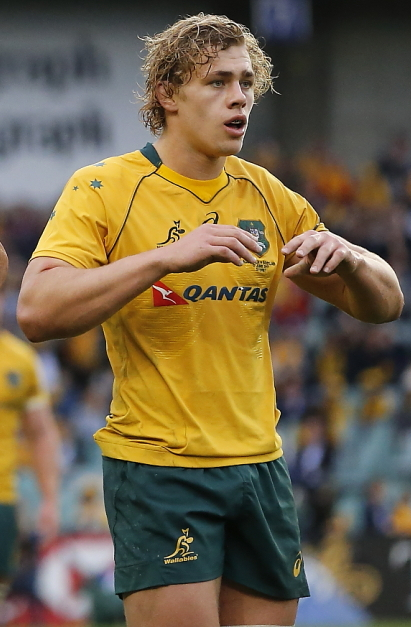
Hanigan with Australia in 2017

Hanigan represented Australia at schoolboy level and was an important member of the side on their grand-slam European tour in 2013. He was also a member of the Australia Under-20 which competed at the 2015 World Rugby Under 20 Championship in Italy after which he was named his side's MVP for the tournament. Hanigan made his debut for the Australian Wallabies in 2017 against Fiji.

== Super Rugby statistics ==
As of 29 August 2020

Season	Team	Apps	Start	Sub	Mins	T	C	PG	DG	Pts	YC	RC
2016	Waratahs	3	0	3	41	0	0	0	0	0	0	0
2017	Waratahs	12	11	1	902	3	0	0	0	15	2	0
2018	Waratahs	15	15	0	1085	4	0	0	0	20	0	0
2019	Waratahs	13	13	0	849	1	0	0	0	5	0	0
2020 AU	Waratahs	8	7	1	498	0	0	0	0	0	1	0
Total		51	46	5	3375	8	0	0	0	40	3	0
