= Rugby 360 =

Proposed international rugby union competition

Rugby 360, known as R360, is a proposed breakaway global franchised based rugby union competition, headed by former England 2003 Rugby World Cup winner, and British Royal family member, Mike Tindall, scheduled to begin in 2028. The competition is set to feature eight men's teams and four women's teams and will tour the globe in a Formula 1 Grand Prix style league system. 885 Capital is a major funder of the proposed competition.

The competition, not sanctioned by World Rugby, has met strong opposition. On 7 October 2025, eight leading unions (England, New Zealand, Ireland, France, Scotland, Australia, South Africa, and Italy) jointly announced that any men's or women's player joining the competition would be banned from selection for their respective national teams. The following week, Australia's National Rugby League announced any defecting players would receive a ten-year ban from playing in the competition.

In October, Rowena Samarasinhe, former Chief Executive of the failed World 12s competition, claimed in an interview with BBC Sport's Mike Henson that a disruptor to the domestic club game was inevitable.

In November, a number of top players renewed their contracts amid threats of player poaching for the new competition. Further, Sale Sharks owner Michelle Orange warned R360 would be "the death of club rugby around the world" if it was to be launched. Also in November, the British & Irish Lions said they will ban any player who signs up for the proposed R360 competition from the first ever Lions women's tour in 2027, the statement did not explicitly mention men's players but it said they "fully support" the unions' move, which covers both genders. It is the first time the Lions have restricted its playing pool.

The Rugby Football Union chief executive Bill Sweeney says he does not know of any England player, male or female, who is planning to sacrifice their international career for an R360 contract.

In November 2025, it was announced that the commencement of the competition would be delayed from 2026 to 2028. Shortly before this announcement, some players had withdrawn from the competition.
