= Tyrone Vi'iga =

Cook Islands international rugby league & union player

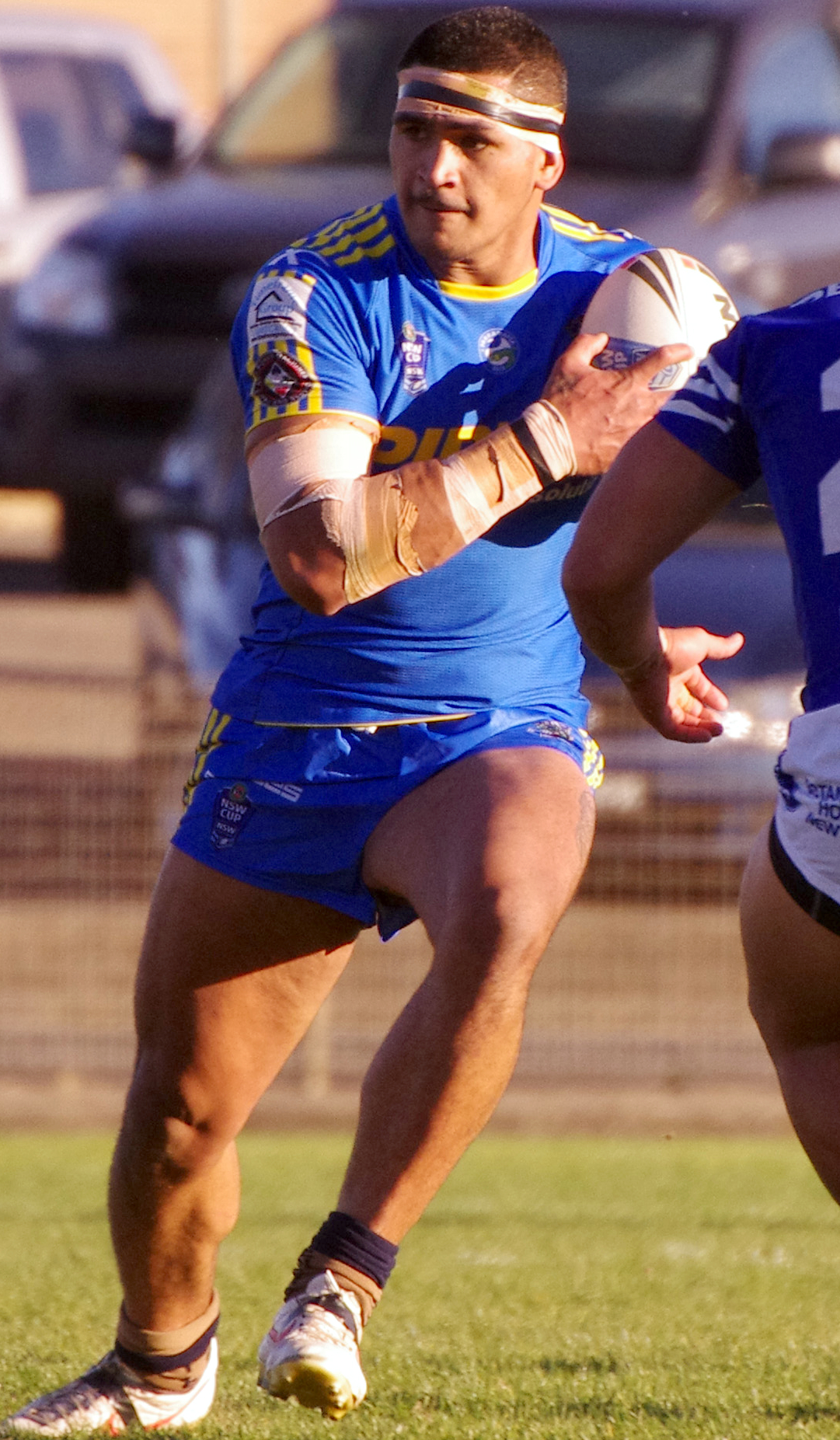

Personal information
- Born: Tyrone Vi'iga; 9 June 1992 (age 34) Sydney, Australia
- Height: 190 cm (6 ft 3 in)
- Weight: 117 kg (18 st 6 lb)

Playing information
- Position: Prop
Club
Years	Team	Pld	T	G	FG	P
	Cronulla-Sutherland Sharks
	Wentworthville Magpies
	Total	0	0	0	0	0
Representative
Years	Team	Pld	T	G	FG	P
2012	Cook Islands	1	0	0	0	0

Rugby union career
- Position: Backrow
Senior career
Years	Team	Apps	(Points)
2014	Penrith Emus	5	(0)
2015	Eastern Suburbs	11	(0)
2015	NSW Country Eagles	0	(0)
2016–2017	Parramatta Two Blues	28	(35)
2016	Greater Sydney Rams	6	(42)
2017–2020	AS Béziers	48	(35)
2020-2022	Provence Rugby	37	(10)
2022-	US Montauban	46	(15)
- Correct as of 10 June 2025
International career
Years	Team	Apps	(Points)
2018-	Cook Islands	2	(0)

Tyrone Vi'iga (born 9 June 1992) is an Australian professional rugby footballer of Cook Islands & Samoan heritage. He plays for AS Béziers Hérault. He previously played for the NSW Country Eagles, and Sydney RAMS and also represented the Cook Islands. He has played both 'codes' but is currently a Rugby Union professional.

== Career ==
=== Rugby league ===
Vi'iga played as a prop in rugby league. He was a member of the Cronulla-Sutherland Sharks under 20s side in 2012, before joining the Wentworthville Magpies in the NSW Cup competition.

In October 2012, he represented the Cook Islands in their 28–24 win over Lebanon. He was selected in the Cook Islands squad for the 2013 Rugby League World Cup, but did not make any appearances during the tournament.

=== Rugby union ===
Vi'iga switched to rugby union to play in the Shute Shield competition as a backrower with the Penrith club in 2014 and then Eastern Suburbs in 2015. He was signed by the New South Wales Country Eagles team for the 2015 National Rugby Championship. Joined Two Blue (Parramatta) 2016, Western Sydney Rams NRC 2016
