= Jack Payne (rugby union) =

Australian rugby union player

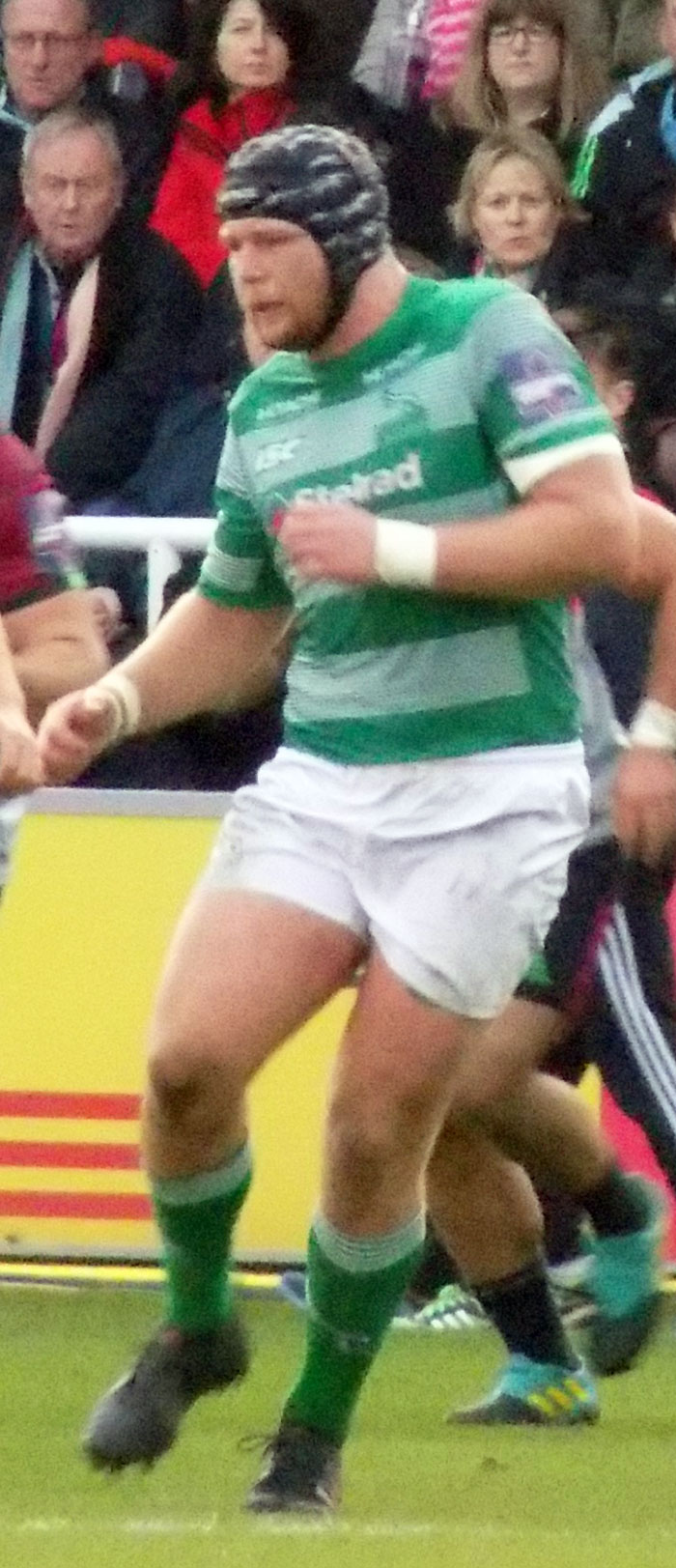
- Payne playing for Newcastle, 2018.
- Born: Jack Robbie Payne; 13 September 1994 (age 32) Darwin, Northern Territory, Australia
- Height: 195 cm (6 ft 5 in)
- Weight: 128 kg (20 st 2 lb; 282 lb)
- School: St. Columban's College

Rugby union career
- Position: Prop
- Current team: Newcastle Falcons
Senior career
Years	Team	Apps	(Points)
2014–2016	Scarlets	11	(0)
2016	Western Sydney Rams	10	(12)
2016–2017	Darlington Mowden Park	35	(35)
2017–	Newcastle Falcons	26	(25)
- Correct as of 02 September 2020
International career
Years	Team	Apps	(Points)
2014	Australia U20	8	(5)
- Correct as of 27 January 2016

Jack Payne (born 13 September 1994) is an Australian rugby union player. Now retired, he finished his career playing for Newcastle Falcons in the English Premiership Rugby.

Payne previously played for the Scarlets regional team in Wales and is Welsh qualified. He also previously represented the Australia U20s rugby team. He started his career at flaker / second row. and moved to tighthead prop in 2016, where he eventually finished his career.

Payne made his debut for the Scarlets regional team in 2014 having played for Brothers Old Boys and Queensland Reds U20s side.

He joined Darlington Mowden Park in 2016 and caught the eye of Dean Richards. Payne then joined Newcastle Falcons at the beginning of the 2017–18 season.

He retired from professional rugby in 2019 due to head injuries.
