= Ted Postal =

- Born: 16 May 1991 (age 35)
- Height: 190 cm (6 ft 3 in)
- Weight: 100 kg (220 lb)
- School: Nudgee College

Rugby union career
- Position: Flanker
Senior career
Years	Team	Apps	(Points)
2013–15	RC Narbonne	56	(5)
Super Rugby
Years	Team	Apps	(Points)
2010	Force	1	(0)

Ted Postal (born 16 May 1991), formerly Terterani Erasito, is an Australian former professional rugby union player.

A native of Queensland, Postal was educated at Nudgee College. He has been known as "Ted" since childhood as his given name was hard to pronounce and he adopted his mother's maiden name when his parents separated.

Postal, a flanker, spent some time in Perth with the Western Force and made one Super 14 appearance, against the Bulls at Perth Stadium during their 2010 campaign. He represented the Australia under-20s at the 2011 Junior World Championship in Italy. After playing for RC Narbonne in France between 2013 and 2015, Postal returned to Brisbane and featured in the 2016 Brothers premiership-winning team.
