= New South Wales Country Eagles =

Australian rugby union club

(Australia) New South Wales Country Eagles
- NSW Country Eagles
- Union: NSW Country Rugby
- Founded: 2014
- Disbanded: 2020 (competition disbanded)
- Region: NSW Regions, excl. Sydney & Southern NSW
- Ground(s): (Dubbo) Caltex Park (Port Macquarie) Regional Stadium (Wollongong) WIN Stadium
- Coach: Robert Taylor
- Captain: Ned Hanigan
- League: National Rugby Championship
- 2018: 7th
1st kit	2nd kit

The New South Wales Country Eagles is an Australian rugby union football team competes in the National Rugby Championship (NRC). The team was founded by a group of patrons associated with country rugby in New South Wales. The Eagles team plays home matches in regional centres of New South Wales including Armidale, Goulburn, Orange, and Tamworth.

== History ==
The ARU announced in December 2013 that the National Rugby Championship (NRC) would commence in 2014. Expressions of interest were open to all parties, with the accepted bids announced in early 2014. A group of rugby patrons headed by businessmen Rick Hutchinson and Peter Tonkin (son of former Wallaby Arthur Tonkin) founded the bid for a New South Wales Country team. On 24 March 2014, it was announced that New South Wales Country would be in the new competition.

The first general manager of the NSW Country Eagles, former Wallabies player James Grant, stated in 2014 that the team would be based in Sydney but travel to regional centres in New South Wales to play home games. Cities including Orange, Dubbo, Mudgee, Lismore, Tamworth, Moree, Armidale and Newcastle expressed an interest in staging matches.

Originally it was thought that the NSW Country team for the NRC would be wholly composed of city-based players of country origin, but a goal of recruiting between four and eight players that were country-based was announced. In the early years of the competition. Sydney clubs Easts and Randwick had a direct link as feeder clubs for the NSW Country team in the NRC. Ahead of the 2016 season, the Sydney University club took a 25% stake in the team and provided many Eagles players from that season onwards.

Darren Coleman was appointed as the first head coach of NSW Country team in 2014. Coleman had previously guided Japanese team Toyota Shokki to Top League promotion for the 2013–14 season. Prior to that, he was also the assistant coach of the Central Coast Rays team which won the ARC in 2007. Coleman continued as head coach through to 2018.

== Name and colours ==

2014–2015 NSW Country Eagles kit and logo

The Country Eagles are named for the wedge-tailed eagle, the largest bird of prey found in Australia. The team logo features a wedge-tailed eagle and, as the bird's feathers are mainly black with deep golden coloured highlights on the neck and wings, black and gold were adopted as the team's original colours. The logo and mascot, "Wedgie", were chosen in consultation with the NSW Country Rugby Union to differentiate the team from the existing Cockatoos representative side. The Eagles colours, however, remain similar to the traditional black and gold (amber) colours worn by NSW Country.

== Sponsorship ==
Elders Limited formed a partnership with NSW Country Eagles in 2015, and has been the team's main front-of-jersey sponsor since 2016. The major naming sponsor of the Country Eagles for the 2014 and 2015 seasons was Charles Sturt University (CSU).

== Grounds ==
Location of NSW Country's home venues for 2019

The NSW Country team plays its home matches in regional centres of New South Wales. In previous seasons, the team has also hosted some games in Sydney. The team has its training base at the University of NSW in Sydney's eastern suburbs, the same facility used by the Waratahs.

The team has scheduled home matches at the following locations:

City	Venue	Capacity
Home venues for the current season
Dubbo	Caltex Park	12,000
Port Macquarie	Regional Stadium	10,000
Wollongong	WIN Stadium	23,000
Home venues for previous seasons
Armidale	Bellevue Oval	3,000
Bathurst	Ann Ashwood Park	3,000
Camden	Camden Rugby Park	3,000
Gosford	Central Coast Stadium	20,059
Goulburn	Simon Poidevin Oval	3,000
Lismore	Oakes Oval	10,000
Mudgee	Glen Willow Stadium	10,000
Newcastle	Sports Ground No. 2	5,000
Orange	Wade Park	8,000
Tamworth	Chillingworth Oval	3,000
Tamworth	Scully Park	11,000
Tamworth	Magpies Rugby Park	3,000
Sydney	Concord Oval	20,000
Sydney	Coogee Oval	5,000
Sydney	University Oval No. 2	5,000
Sydney	Woollahra Oval	5,000

== Current squad ==
The squad for the 2019 NRC season:

NSW Country squad – NRC 2019
Prop: (Australia) Angus Bell; (Australia) Archer Hall (Note: Den Hoedt, Walker, Nowlan (Rd 1), Ah Wong, Manuofetoa (Rd 2), and Hall (Rd 3).); (Australia) **Harry Johnson-Holmes**; (Australia) Rob Lagudi; (Australia) **Tom Robertson** (Note: Robertson and Tuala (Rd 4).); (Australia) Matt Sandell; (Australia) Chris Talakai; (Australia) Cody Walker; Hooker: (Australia) Aaron Blacklock; (Australia) Tom Horton; (Australia) Andrew Tuala; (Australia) David Vea; Lock: (Australia) Nathan Den Hoedt; (Australia) Jed Holloway; (Australia) Tom Nowlan; (Australia) Tom Staniforth; (Australia) Connor Vest; Backrow: (Australia) Nick Champion de Crespigny; (Australia) **Ned Hanigan** (c); (Australia) Will Harris; (Australia) Michael Icely; (Australia) Maclean Jones; (Australia) Patrick Tafa	Scrum-half: (Australia) **Jake Gordon**; (Australia) Jack Grant; (Australia) Henry Robertson; Fly-half: (Australia) Mack Mason; (Australia) Connor O'Shea; Centre: (Australia) Nigel Ah Wong; (New Zealand) Ofa Manuofetoa; (Australia) Joey Walton; (Australia) Ben Woollett; Wing: (Australia) James Dargaville; (Australia) James Kane; (Australia) Mark Nawaqanitawase; (Australia) Triston Reilly; Fullback: (Australia) Tim Clements; (Australia) James Turner; **Bold** denotes player is internationally capped; (c) denotes team captain; ^{1} denotes marquee player
Notes: The initial squad was named in late August. Players joining in subsequent rounds were:

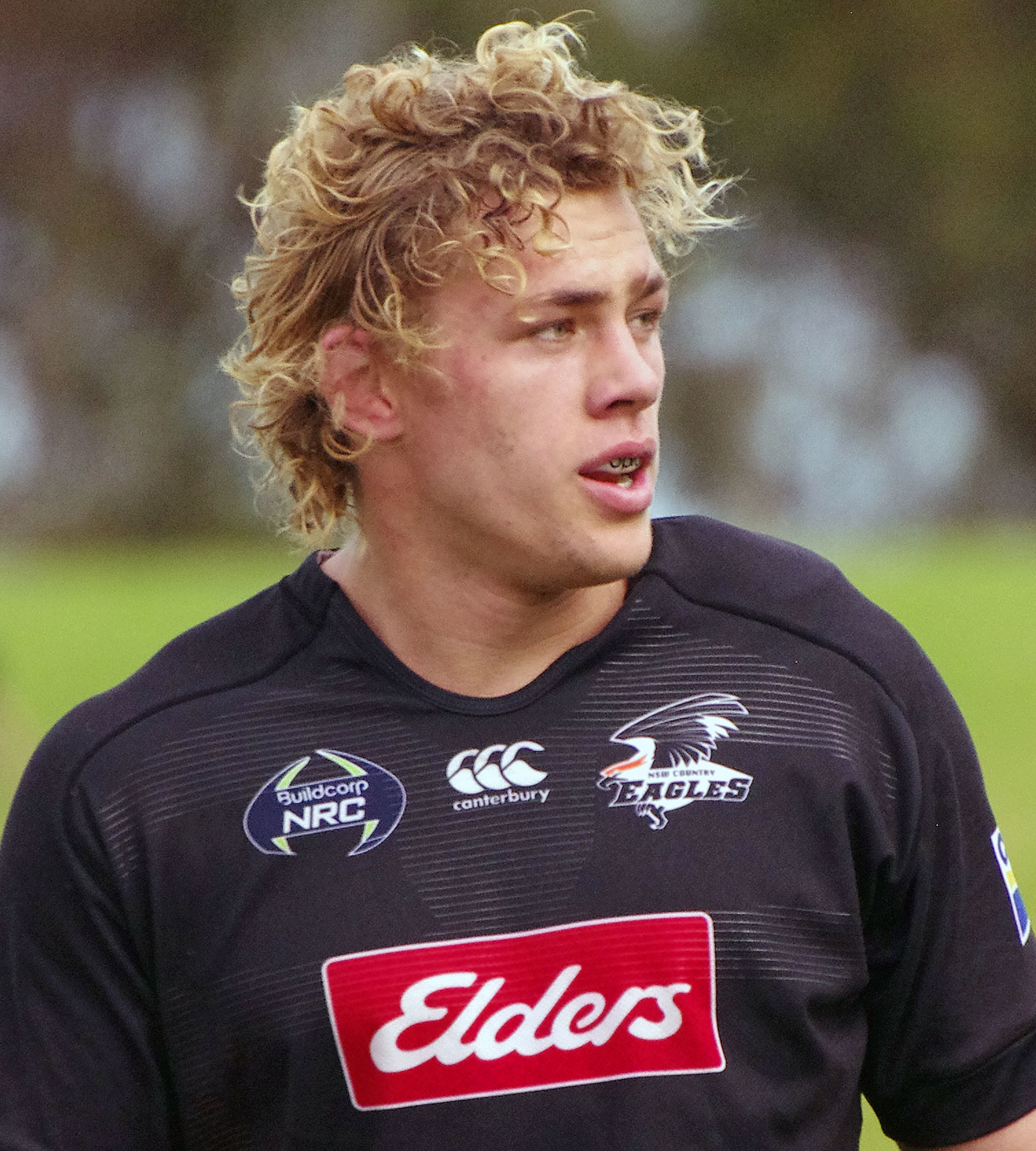
Flanker Ned Hanigan.

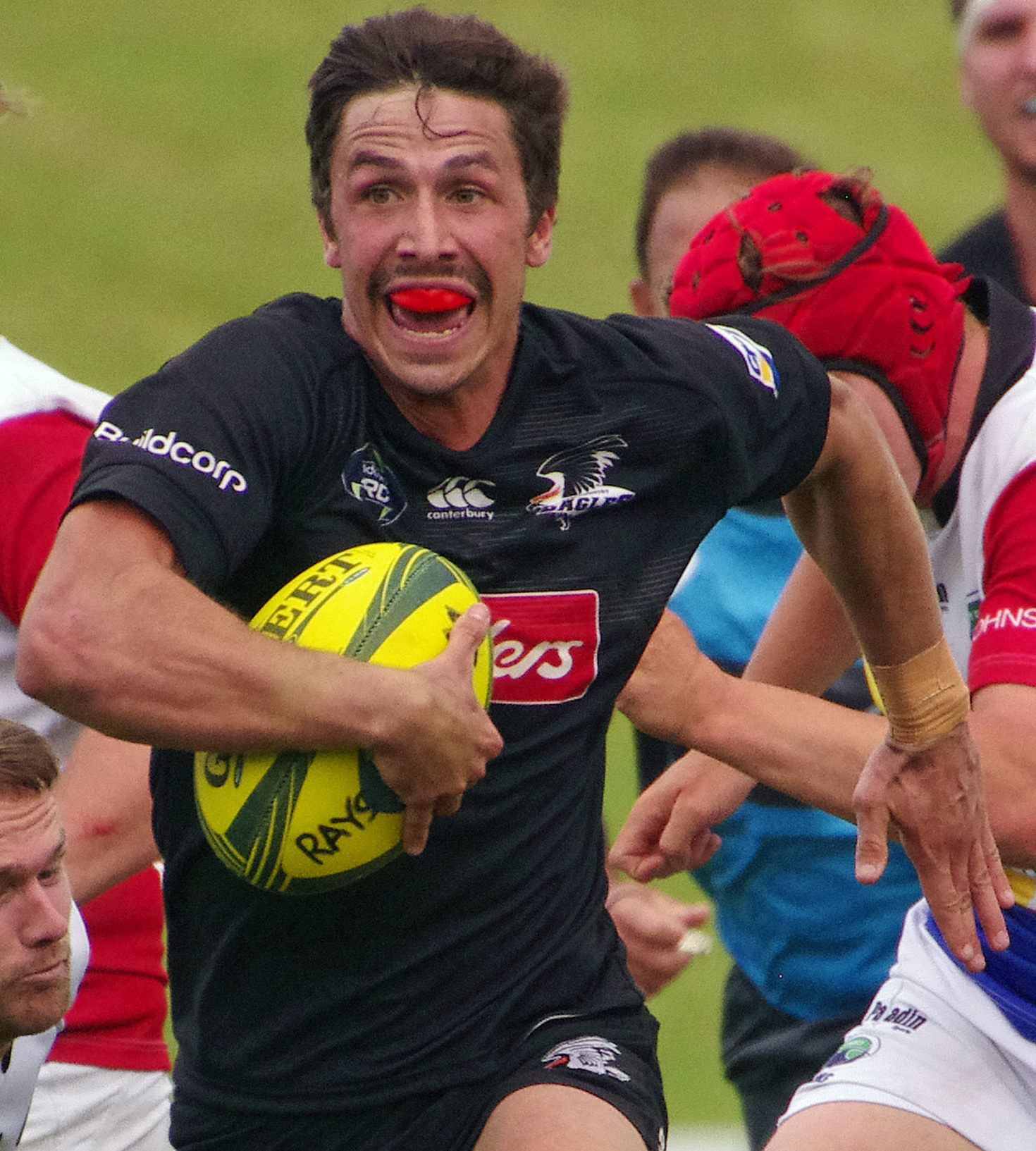
Scrum-half Jake Gordon.

== Records ==
=== Honours ===
- **National Rugby Championship**
  - Runners-up: 2016
  - Playoff appearances: 2014
- **Horan-Little Shield**
  - Season winners: 2016

=== Season standings ===
National Rugby Championship

Year	Pos	Pld	W	D	L	F	A	+/-	BP	Pts	Play-offs
2018	**7th**	7	1	0	6	140	280	−140	2	**6**	Did not compete
2017	**5th**	8	4	1	3	219	217	+2	2	**20**	Did not compete
2016	**1st**	7	6	0	1	280	190	+90	4	**28**	Grand final loss to Perth Spirit by 20–16.
2015	**5th**	8	4	0	4	225	260	−35	3	**19**	Did not compete
2014	**2nd**	8	6	0	2	251	202	+49	3	**27**	Semi-final loss to Brisbane City by 26–32.

=== Head coaches ===
- Robert Taylor (2019)
- Darren Coleman (2014–2018)

=== Captains ===
- Ned Hanigan (2019)
- Paddy Ryan (2016–2018)
- Jono Lance (2015)
- Matthew Carraro, Cameron Treloar (2014)

=== Squads ===
2016 NSW Country Eagles squad – NRC
The squad for the 2016 National Rugby Championship season:
**Props**: Cam Betham; Jed Gillespie; Samuel Needs; **Tom Robertson**; **Paddy Ryan** (c); Sonny Suatala; **Hookers**: Folau Fainga'a; Tolu Latu; **Locks**: Tim Buchanan; Ned Hanigan; Ryan McCauley; **Dean Mumm**^{1}; Will Munro	**Loose forwards**: Mark Baldwin; Sam Croke; Tom Cusack; Rohan O’Regan; Rowan Perry; Jake Wainwright; Sam Ward; **Scrum-halves**: Jake Gordon; **Nick Phipps**^{1}; Mitchell Short; **Fly-halves**: Tayler Adams; Andrew Deegan; **Bernard Foley**^{1}	**Centres**: Samuel Figg; Kyle Godwin; Tom Hill; David Horwitz; **Apakuki Ma’afu**; **Wingers**: Charlie Clifton; Christian Kagiassis; Andrew Kellaway; Reece Robinson; Ernest Suavua; Joel Brooks; Jarome McKenzie; Tom Merritt; **Fullbacks**: Alex Newsome; Angus Roberts; (c) Team captain **Bold** denotes internationally capped players at the time^{1} Allocated national player additional to the contracted squad.

2015 NSW Country Eagles squad – NRC
The squad for the 2015 National Rugby Championship season:
**Props**: Andrew Collins; David Feao; Dashville Kuate; Dane Maraki; Jerome Vaai; **Hookers**: Ryan Dalziel; Peter Nau; Tom Sexton; **Locks**: Jock Armstrong; **Sam Carter**^{1}; BJ Edwards; Tom Staniforth; Ned Hanigan; Nicholas Palmer	**Loose forwards**: Mark Baldwin; Sam Croke; Sam Lousi; Will Miller (vc); **Beau Robinson**; Pauli Tuala; Tyrone Viiga; **Scrum-halves**: Michael Dowsett; Jock Merriman; **Fly-halves**: David Horwitz; Jono Lance (c); **Matt To'omua**^{1}	**Centres**: Samuel Figg; Brogan Roods; Ed Stubbs; **Wingers**: Joel Brooks; Charlie Clifton; Andrew Kellaway; Jarome McKenzie; Tom Merritt; **Fullbacks**: David Harvey; Will Fay; (c) Team captain **Bold** denotes internationally capped players at the time^{1} Allocated national player additional to the contracted squad.

2014 NSW Country Eagles squad – NRC
The squad for the 2014 National Rugby Championship season:
**Props**: Michael Alaalatoa; Duncan Chubb; **Jake Ilnicki**; **Sekope Kepu**^{1}; Max Lahiff; Tim Metcher; Ben Suisala; **Hookers**: Ryan Dalziel; Billy Johnston; **Josh Mann-Rea**; Will Weeks; **Locks**: Mitchell Chapman; **Kane Douglas**; Ben Matwijow; Cameron Treloar	**Loose forwards**: Sam Croke; Tala Gray; **Stephen Hoiles**; Will Miller; Pauli Tuala; Ita Vaea; **Scrum-halves**: Darcy Etrich; Brendan McKibbin; Michael Snowden; **Nic White**^{1}; **Fly-halves**: David Horwitz; **Matt To'omua**^{1}; Sam Windsor	**Centres**: **Adam Ashley-Cooper**^{1}; Matthew Carraro (c); Apakuki Ma’afu; Ed Stubbs; Chris Tuatara-Morrison; Samu Wara; **Wingers**: Ethan Ford; John Grant; Andrew Kellaway; Misieli Sinoti; Malakai Watene-Zelezniak; **Fullbacks**: Patrick Dellit; (c) Team captain **Bold** denotes internationally capped players at the time^{1} Allocated national player additional to the contracted squad.

== Gallery ==
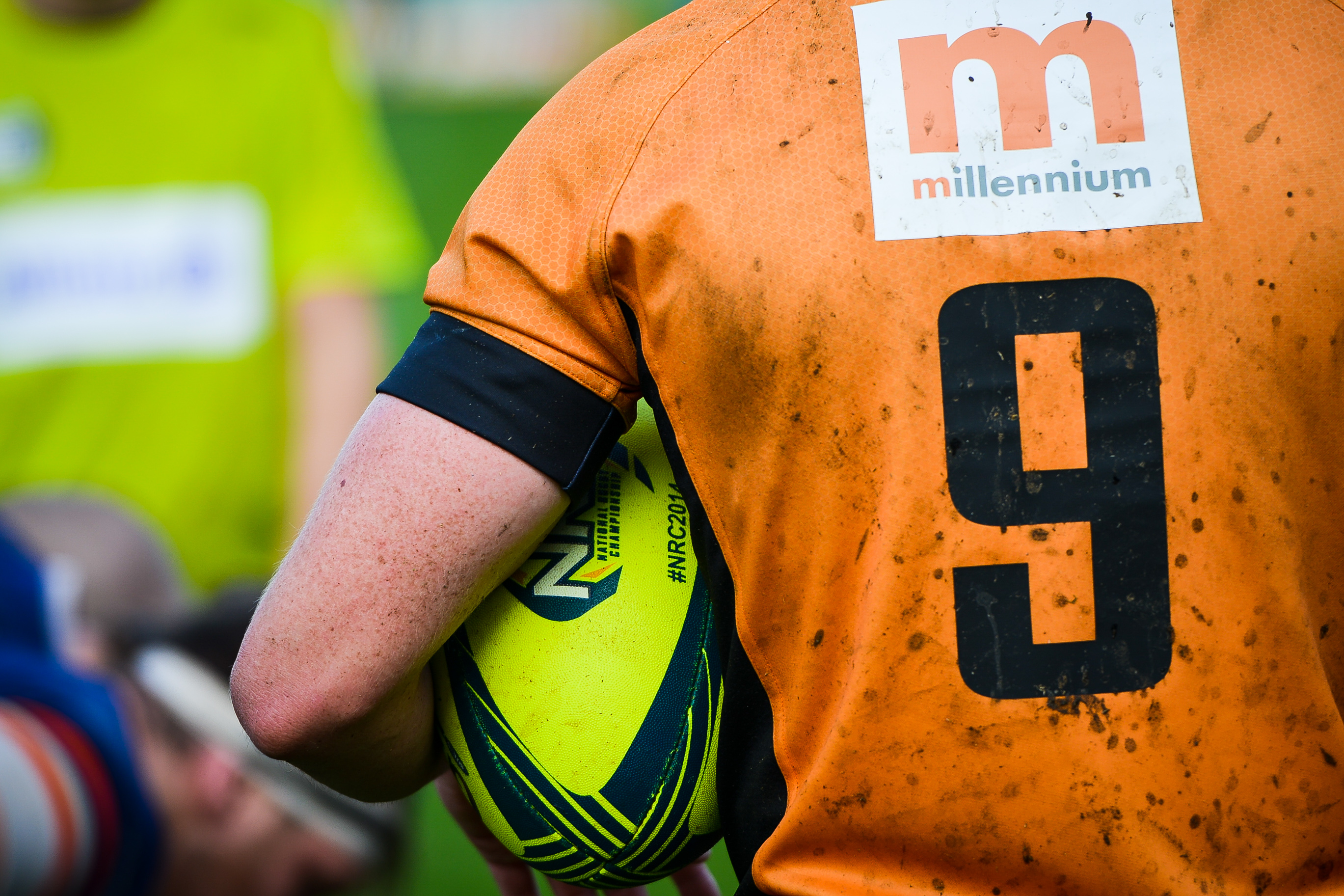
NSW Country Eagles Round 1

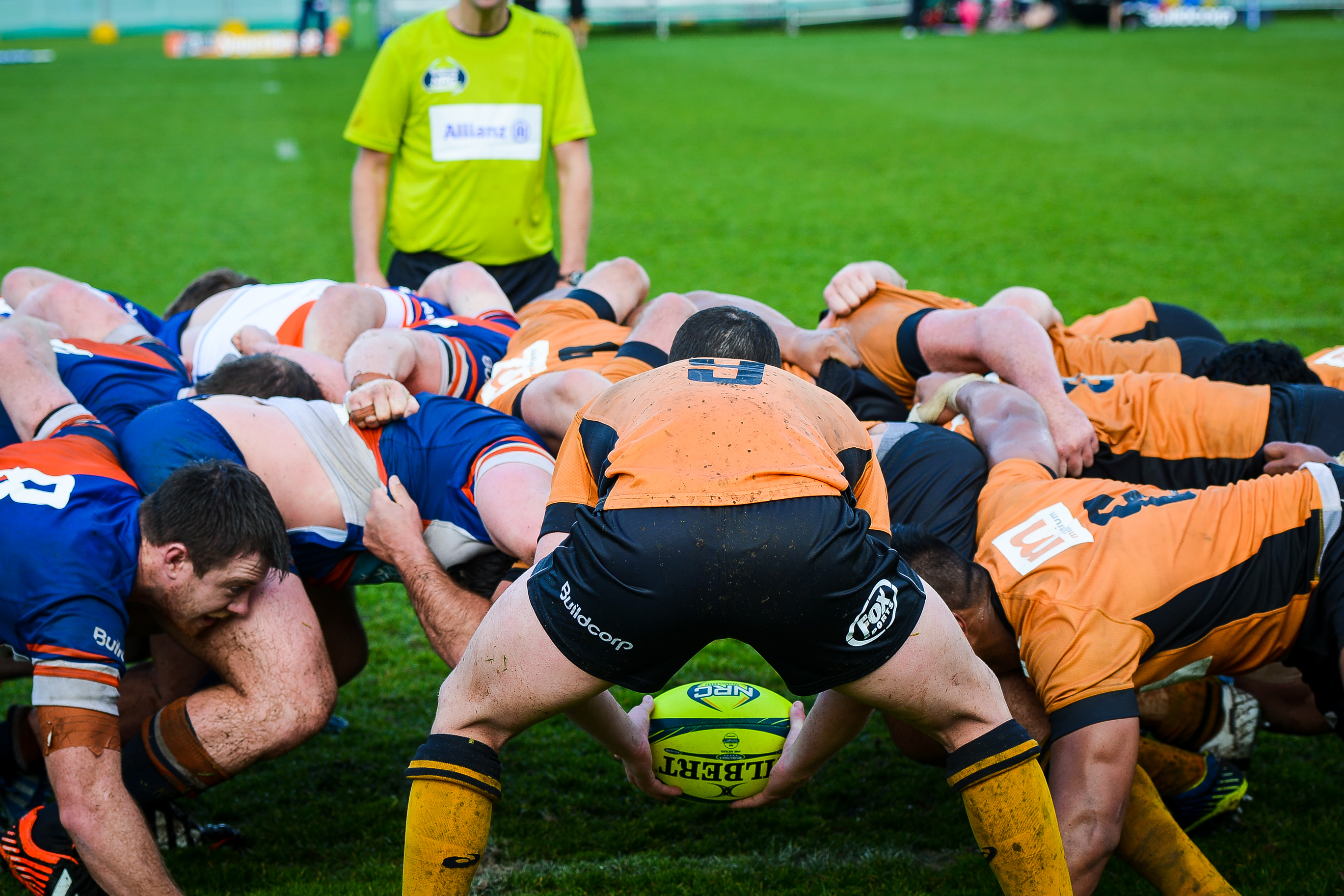
NSW Country Eagles Coogee Oval

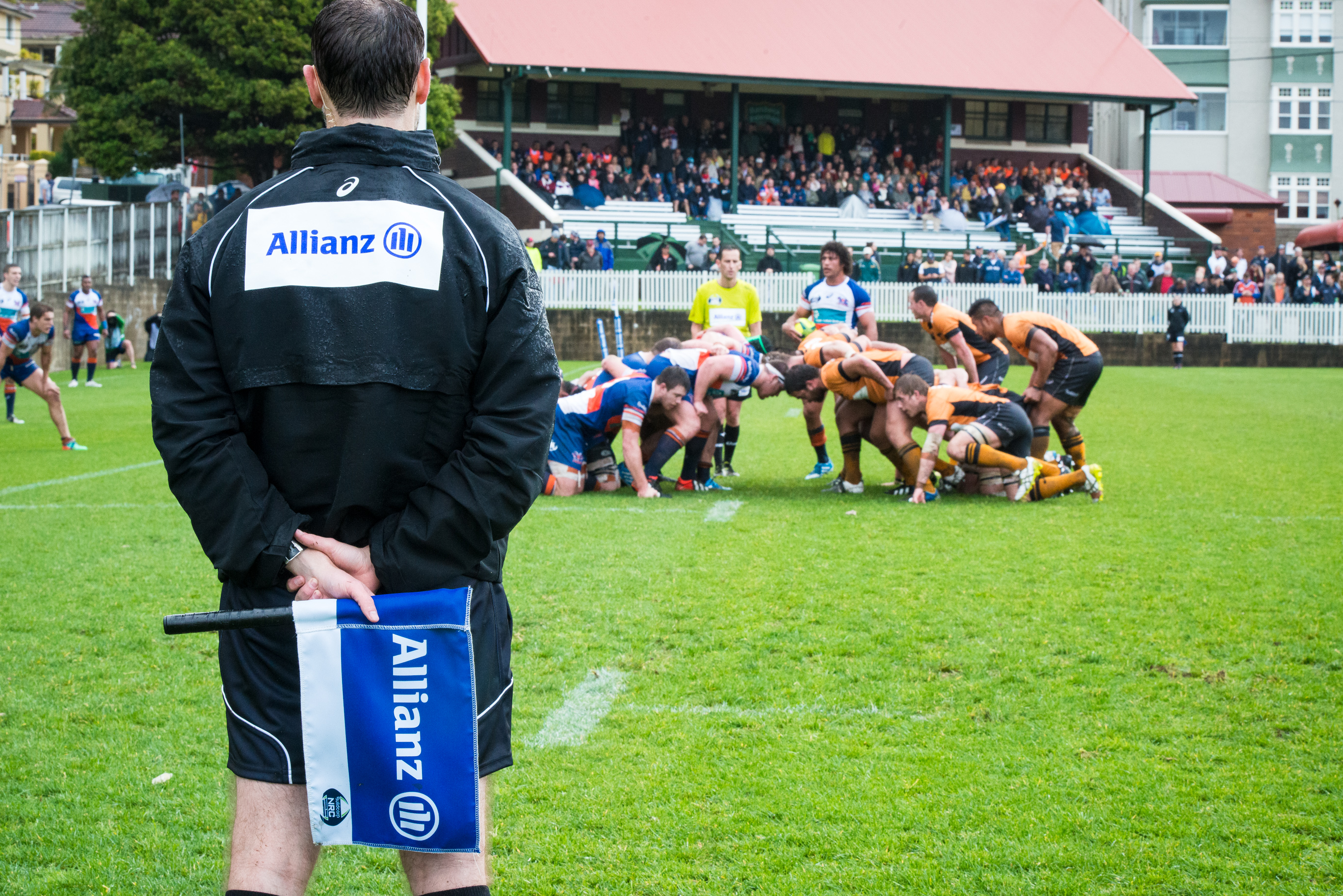
NSW Country Eagles Coogee Oval

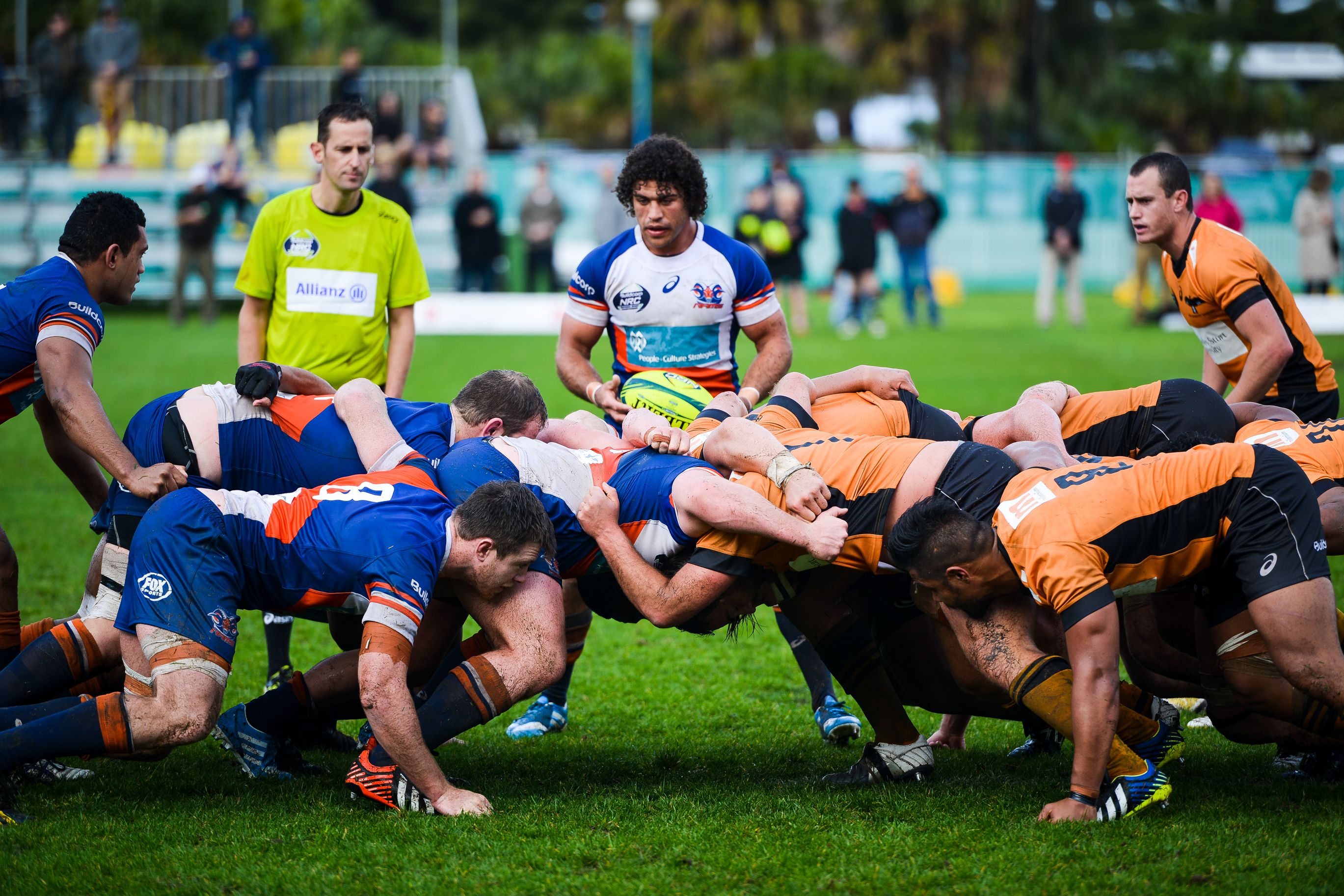
NSW Country Eagles Coogee Oval

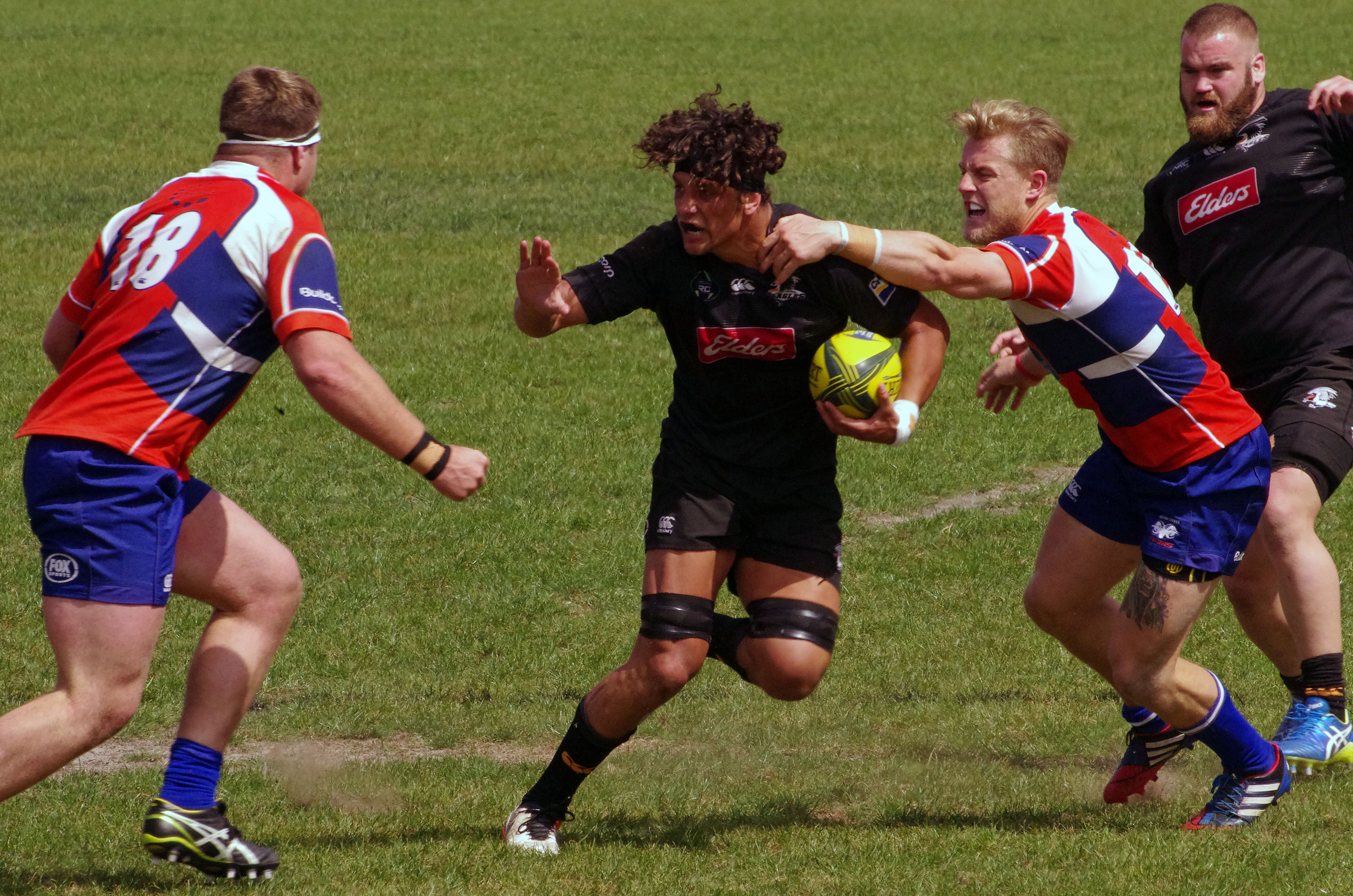
Sam Figg runs the ball against the Rams in 2016

== See also ==
- New South Wales Rugby Union (NSWRU)
- New South Wales Country Cockatoos
- Combined New South Wales–Queensland Country
