= 2013 Australia rugby union tour of Great Britain, Ireland and Italy =

- Coach: Ewen McKenzie
- Tour captain: Ben Mowen
- Top point scorer: Quade Cooper (51)
- Top try scorer(s): Nick Cummins (3); Israel Folau (3)
Summary
P	W	D	L
Total
6	4	0	2
Test match
6	4	0	2
Opponent
P	W	D	L
New Zealand
1	0	0	1
England
1	0	0	1
Italy
1	1	0	0
Ireland
1	1	0	0
Scotland
1	1	0	0
Wales
1	1	0	0

Tour chronology
- ← 2010 Asia & Europe Japan 2026 →

The 2013 Australia rugby union tour of Great Britain, Ireland and Italy was a rugby union tour involving the visiting Australian team and the home teams of England, Ireland, Italy, Scotland and Wales. They also played an additional Test match against New Zealand, which served as the third and final Bledisloe Cup match for 2013.

As part of the tour, Australia attempted their first Grand Slam tour of the Home Nations since 2009, following their 2–1 defeat to the British & Irish Lions in June 2013. However, their first Grand Slam since 1984 was not possible after a 20–13 loss to England in the opening week of the tour, which also meant they were unable to retain the Cook Cup.

The Wallabies became the first team to score 33 points against New Zealand in New Zealand during the third Bledisloe Cup match, and also retained the Lansdowne Cup against Ireland. They reclaimed the Hopetoun Cup for the first time since 2006, after losing it in 2009 and failing to regain it in 2012. Australia also won the James Bevan Trophy for the eighth time, and for the sixth consecutive time, in the closing match of the tour.

== Schedule ==
Date	Home team	Score	Away team	Venue
19 October	New Zealand	41–33	Australia	Forsyth Barr Stadium, Dunedin
2 November	England	20–13	Australia	Twickenham, London
9 November	Italy	20–50	Australia	Stadio Olimpico di Torino, Turin
16 November	Ireland	15–32	Australia	Aviva Stadium, Dublin
23 November	Scotland	15–21	Australia	Murrayfield Stadium, Edinburgh
30 November	Wales	26–30	Australia	Millennium Stadium, Cardiff

== Matches ==
=== New Zealand ===
19 October 2013
19:35 NZST (UTC+12)

New Zealand	41–33	Australia
Try: Savea 9' c Cane 29' c Cruden 36' c Read 53' m Con: Cruden (3/4) 10', 30', 37'; Pen: Cruden (4/6) 18', 22', 34', 43'; Barrett (1/1) 69'	Report	Try: Ashley-Cooper 39' c To'omua 47' c Kuridrani 76' c Con: Cooper (3/3) 40', 48', 77'; Pen: Cooper (3/3) 3', 24', 32; Drop: Cooper 15'

Forsyth Barr Stadium, Dunedin
Attendance: 28,973
Referee: Craig Joubert (South Africa)

FB	15	Israel Dagg
RW	14	Charles Piutau
OC	13	Ben Smith	(substituted off) 72'
IC	12	Ma'a Nonu
LW	11	Julian Savea
FH	10	Aaron Cruden	(substituted off) 59'
SH	9	Aaron Smith	(substituted off) 67'
N8	8	Kieran Read (c)
OF	7	Sam Cane
BF	6	Liam Messam	(substituted off) 72'
RL	5	Sam Whitelock
LL	4	Jeremy Thrush	(substituted off) 43'
TP	3	Charlie Faumuina	(substituted off) 67'
HK	2	Keven Mealamu	(substituted off) 59'
LP	1	Tony Woodcock	(substituted off) 67'
Replacements:
HK	16	Dane Coles	(substituted on) 59'
PR	17	Wyatt Crockett	(substituted on) 67'
PR	18	Ben Franks	(substituted on) 67'
LK	19	Brodie Retallick	(substituted on) 43'
FL	20	Steve Luatua	(substituted on) 72'
SH	21	Tawera Kerr-Barlow	(substituted on) 67'
FH	22	Beauden Barrett	(substituted on) 59'
FH	23	Tom Taylor	(substituted on) 72'
Coach:
(New Zealand) Steve Hansen

FB	15	Israel Folau
RW	14	Adam Ashley-Cooper
OC	13	Tevita Kuridrani
IC	12	Matt To'omua
LW	11	Peter Betham	(substituted off) 67'
FH	10	Quade Cooper
SH	9	Will Genia
N8	8	Ben McCalman	(substituted off) 67'
OF	7	Michael Hooper
BF	6	Ben Mowen
RL	5	James Horwill (c)	(substituted off) 64'
LL	4	Rob Simmons
TP	3	Ben Alexander	(substituted off) 48'
HK	2	Stephen Moore	(substituted off) 59'
LP	1	James Slipper	(substituted off) 61'
Replacements:
HK	16	Saia Fainga'a	(substituted on) 59'
PR	17	Benn Robinson	(substituted on) 48'
PR	18	Sekope Kepu	(substituted on) 61'
LK	19	Sitaleki Timani	(substituted on) 64'
FL	20	Dave Dennis	(substituted on) 67'
SH	21	Nic White
CE	22	Mike Harris
FB	23	Bernard Foley	(substituted on) 67'
Coach:
(Australia) Ewen McKenzie

Touch judges:
Jaco Peyper (South Africa)
Stuart Berry (South Africa)
Television match official:
Vinny Munro (New Zealand)

Notes:

- Australia became the first team to score 33 points against New Zealand in New Zealand.
- Will Genia became just the third Australian scrum-half and the 39th Wallaby player to reach 50 test caps.
- Peter Betham made his international debut for Australia.

=== England ===
2 November 2013
14:30 GMT (UTC+0)

England	20–13	Australia
Try: Robshaw 50' c Farrell 58' c Con: Farrell (2/2) 31', 57'; Pen: Farrell (2/5) 3', 28',	Report	Try: To'omua 31' c Con: Cooper (1/1) 31'; Pen: Cooper (2/4) 9', 34'

Twickenham, London
Attendance: 80,691
Referee: George Clancy (Ireland)

FB	15	Mike Brown
RW	14	Chris Ashton
OC	13	Joel Tomkins
IC	12	Billy Twelvetrees	(substituted off) 66'
LW	11	Marland Yarde
FH	10	Owen Farrell
SH	9	Lee Dickson	(substituted off) 55'
N8	8	Billy Vunipola	(substituted off) 66'
OF	7	Chris Robshaw (c)
BF	6	Tom Wood
RL	5	Courtney Lawes
LL	4	Joe Launchbury	(substituted off) 75'
TP	3	Dan Cole	(substituted off) 66'
HK	2	Tom Youngs	(substituted off) 54'
LP	1	Mako Vunipola	(substituted off) 54'
Replacements:
HK	16	Dylan Hartley	(substituted on) 54'
PR	17	Joe Marler	(substituted on) 54'
PR	18	David Wilson	(substituted on) 66'
LK	19	Dave Attwood	(substituted on) 75'
N8	20	Ben Morgan	(substituted on) 66'
SH	21	Ben Youngs	(substituted on) 55'
FH	22	Toby Flood	(substituted on) 66'
FB	23	Ben Foden
Coach:
(England) Stuart Lancaster

FB	15	Israel Folau
RW	14	Adam Ashley-Cooper	49' to 54'
OC	13	Tevita Kuridrani
IC	12	Matt To'omua
LW	11	Nick Cummins
FH	10	Quade Cooper
SH	9	Will Genia	(substituted off) 66'
N8	8	Ben Mowen (c)
OF	7	Michael Hooper
BF	6	Scott Fardy	(substituted off) 49'
RL	5	James Horwill
LL	4	Sitaleki Timani	(substituted off) 62'
TP	3	Ben Alexander	(substituted off) 49'
HK	2	Stephen Moore	(substituted off) 68'
LP	1	James Slipper	(substituted off) 61'
Replacements:
HK	16	Saia Fainga'a	(substituted on) 68'
PR	17	Benn Robinson	(substituted on) 61'
PR	18	Sekope Kepu	(substituted on) 49'
LK	19	Kane Douglas	(substituted on) 62'
FL	20	Ben McCalman	(substituted on) 49'
SH	21	Nic White	(substituted on) 66'
CE	22	Christian Lealiifano
FB	23	Bernard Foley	(substituted on) 49'	(substituted off) 54'
Coach:
(Australia) Ewen McKenzie

Man of the Match:
Mike Brown (England)

Touch judges:
Romain Poite (France)
Dudley Phillips (Ireland)
Television match official:
Marshall Kilgore (Ireland)

Notes:

- England reclaim the Cook Cup.
- Joel Tomkins made his international debut for England.

=== Italy ===
9 November 2013
15:00 CET (UTC+1)

Italy	20–50	Australia
Try: McLean 11' c Cittadini 62' m Allan 78' m Con: Di Bernardo (1/1) 13'; Pen: Di Bernardo (1/3) 4'	Report	Try: Mowen 15' c Kuridrani 21' c Cummins (2) 31' m, 50' c Ashley-Cooper 58' c Tomane 66' c Folau 68' c Con: Cooper (4/4) 17', 22', 50', 58'; Lealiifano (2/2) 67', 70'; Pen: Lealiifano (1/1) 65'

Stadio Olimpico di Torino, Turin
Attendance: 25,177
Referee: Glen Jackson (New Zealand)

FB	15	Luke McLean
RW	14	Tommaso Benvenuti	(substituted off) 60'
OC	13	Luca Morisi
IC	12	Alberto Sgarbi
LW	11	Leonardo Sarto
FH	10	Alberto Di Bernardo	(substituted off) 60'
SH	9	Edoardo Gori	(substituted off) 70'
N8	8	Sergio Parisse (c)
OF	7	Robert Barbieri
BF	6	Alessandro Zanni
RL	5	Marco Bortolami	(substituted off) 64'
LL	4	Antonio Pavanello	(substituted off) 51'
TP	3	Martin Castrogiovanni	(substituted off) 59'
HK	2	Davide Giazzon	(substituted off) 51'
LP	1	Michele Rizzo	(substituted off) 51'
Replacements:
HK	16	Leonardo Ghiraldini	(substituted on) 51'
PR	17	Matías Agüero	(substituted on) 51'
PR	18	Lorenzo Cittadini	(substituted on) 59'
LK	19	Quintin Geldenhuys	(substituted on) 51'
LK	20	Joshua Furno	(substituted on) 64'
SH	21	Tobias Botes	(substituted on) 70'
FH	22	Tommaso Allan	(substituted on) 60'
WG	23	Tommaso Iannone	(substituted on) 60'
Coach:
(France) Jacques Brunel

FB	15	Israel Folau
RW	14	Adam Ashley-Cooper	(substituted off) 65'
OC	13	Tevita Kuridrani
IC	12	Matt To'omua
LW	11	Nick Cummins
FH	10	Quade Cooper	(substituted off) 59'
SH	9	Will Genia	(substituted off) 70'
N8	8	Ben Mowen (c)
OF	7	Michael Hooper	(substituted off) 65'
BF	6	Rob Simmons
RL	5	James Horwill
LL	4	Sitaleki Timani	(substituted off) 57'
TP	3	Ben Alexander	(substituted off) 51'
HK	2	Stephen Moore	(substituted off) 67'
LP	1	James Slipper	(substituted off) 60'
Replacements:
HK	16	Saia Fainga'a	(substituted on) 67'
PR	17	Benn Robinson	(substituted on) 60'
PR	18	Sekope Kepu	(substituted on) 51'
FL	19	Dave Dennis	(substituted on) 57'
FL	20	Liam Gill	(substituted on) 65'
SH	21	Nic White	(substituted on) 70'
CE	22	Christian Lealiifano	(substituted on) 59'
WG	23	Joe Tomane	(substituted on) 65'
Coach:
(Australia) Ewen McKenzie

Man of the Match:
Nick Cummins (Australia)

Touch judges:
Romain Poite (France)
John Lacey (Ireland)
Television match official:
Graham Hughes (England)

Notes:

- Luke McLean earned his 50th cap for Italy.
- Tommaso Allan made his international debut for Italy and scored his first test try.

=== Ireland ===
16 November 2013
17:45 WET (UTC+0)

Ireland	15–32	Australia
Pen: Sexton (4/5) 12', 29', 33', 39'; Madigan (1/1) 56'	Report	Try: Cummins 17' c Hooper (2) 23' m, 66' c Cooper 45' c Con: Cooper (3/4) 18', 47', 68'; Pen: Cooper (2/3) 8', 49'

Aviva Stadium, Dublin
Attendance: 46,000
Referee: Chris Pollock (New Zealand)

FB	15	Rob Kearney			(substituted off) 73'
RW	14	Tommy Bowe
OC	13	Brian O'Driscoll	22' to 29'
IC	12	Luke Marshall
LW	11	Fergus McFadden
FH	10	Johnny Sexton	(substituted off) 40'
SH	9	Eoin Reddan	(substituted off) 56'
N8	8	Jamie Heaslip
OF	7	Seán O'Brien	(substituted off) 70'
BF	6	Peter O'Mahony
RL	5	Paul O'Connell (c)
LL	4	Devin Toner	(substituted off) 68'
TP	3	Mike Ross	(substituted off) 65'
HK	2	Rory Best	(substituted off) 65'
LP	1	Cian Healy	(substituted off) 68'
Replacements:
HK	16	Seán Cronin	(substituted on) 65'
PR	17	Jack McGrath	(substituted on) 68'
PR	18	Stephen Archer	(substituted on) 65'
LK	19	Mike McCarthy	(substituted on) 68'
FL	20	Kevin McLaughlin	(substituted on) 70'
SH	21	Conor Murray	(substituted on) 56'
FH	22	Ian Madigan	(substituted on) 40'
CE	23	Robbie Henshaw	(substituted on) 22'	(substituted off) 29'	(substituted on) 73'
Coach:
(New Zealand) Joe Schmidt

FB	15	Israel Folau
RW	14	Adam Ashley-Cooper		(substituted off) 57'
OC	13	Tevita Kuridrani	(red card) 72'
IC	12	Matt To'omua
LW	11	Nick Cummins
FH	10	Quade Cooper		(substituted off) 68'
SH	9	Will Genia		(substituted off) 65'
N8	8	Ben Mowen (c)
OF	7	Michael Hooper	(yellow card) 32' to 42'	(substituted off) 72'
BF	6	Scott Fardy
RL	5	James Horwill		(substituted off) 56'
LL	4	Rob Simmons
TP	3	Sekope Kepu		(substituted off) 65'
HK	2	Stephen Moore		(substituted off) 68'
LP	1	James Slipper		(substituted off) 68'
Replacements:
HK	16	Tatafu Polota-Nau		(substituted on) 68'
PR	17	Benn Robinson		(substituted on) 68'
PR	18	Paddy Ryan		(substituted on) 65'
LK	19	Sitaleki Timani		(substituted on) 56'
FL	20	Liam Gill		(substituted on) 72'
SH	21	Nic White		(substituted on) 65'
CE	22	Christian Lealiifano		(substituted on) 68'
WG	23	Joe Tomane		(substituted on) 57'
Coach:
(Australia) Ewen McKenzie

Man of the Match:
Michael Hooper (Australia)

Touch judges:
Romain Poite (France)
Stuart Berry (South Africa)
Television match official:
Geoff Warren (England)

Notes:

- Australia retain the Lansdowne Cup.

=== Scotland ===
23 November 2013
18:00 GMT (UTC+0)

Scotland	15–21	Australia
Pen: Laidlaw (5/6) 5', 10', 29', 36', 48'	Report	Try: Folau 26' c Feauai-Sautia 43' m Con: Lealiifano (1/2) 27'; Pen: Lealiifano (3/7) 2', 22', 50'

Murrayfield Stadium, Edinburgh
Attendance: 56,732
Referee: Jaco Peyper (South Africa)

FB	15	Sean Maitland
RW	14	Tommy Seymour
OC	13	Nick De Luca
IC	12	Duncan Taylor	(substituted off) 65'
LW	11	Sean Lamont
FH	10	Duncan Weir
SH	9	Greig Laidlaw	(substituted off) 58'
N8	8	David Denton	(substituted off) 60'
OF	7	Kelly Brown (c)
BF	6	Johnnie Beattie
RL	5	Jim Hamilton
LL	4	Grant Gilchrist	(substituted off) 65'
TP	3	Moray Low	(substituted off) 50'
HK	2	Ross Ford	(substituted off) 20'
LP	1	Ryan Grant	(substituted off) 46'
Replacements:
HK	16	Pat MacArthur	(substituted on) 20'
PR	17	Alasdair Dickinson	(substituted on) 46'
PR	18	Euan Murray	(substituted on) 50'
LK	19	Jonny Gray	(substituted on) 65'
FL	20	Kieran Low	(substituted on) 60'
SH	21	Chris Cusiter	(substituted on) 58'
FH	22	Ruaridh Jackson
WG	23	Max Evans	(substituted on) 65'
Coach:
(Australia) Scott Johnson

FB	15	Israel Folau
RW	14	Joe Tomane
OC	13	Christian Lealiifano
IC	12	Mike Harris
LW	11	Chris Feauai-Sautia
FH	10	Quade Cooper
SH	9	Will Genia		(substituted off) 65'
N8	8	Ben Mowen (c)
OF	7	Michael Hooper
BF	6	Scott Fardy		(substituted off) 75'
RL	5	James Horwill		(substituted off) 58'
LL	4	Rob Simmons	(yellow card) 47' to 57'
TP	3	Sekope Kepu		(substituted off) 58'
HK	2	Stephen Moore		(substituted off) 76'
LP	1	James Slipper
Replacements:
HK	16	Saia Fainga'a		(substituted on) 76'
PR	17	Ben Alexander		(substituted on) 58'
PR	18	Paddy Ryan
LK	19	Sitaleki Timani		(substituted on) 58'
FL	20	Ben McCalman		(substituted on) 75'
SH	21	Nic White		(substituted on) 65'
SH	22	Nick Phipps
FB	23	Bernard Foley
Coach:
(Australia) Ewen McKenzie

Man of the Match:
Israel Folau (Australia)

Touch judges:
Pascal Gauzère (France)
Francisco Pastrana (Argentina)
Television match official:
Geoff Warren (England)

Notes:

- Kieran Low made his international debut for Scotland.
- Jim Hamilton earned his 50th test cap for Scotland.
- Australia reclaimed the Hopetoun Cup for the first time since 2006 after losing it in 2009 and having been unable to reclaim it in 2012.

=== Wales ===
30 November 2013
17:00 GMT (UTC+0)

Wales	26–30	Australia
Try: North (2) 1' c, 58' c Con: Halfpenny (1/1) 2'; Biggar (1/1) 59'; Pen: Halfpenny (2/3) 11', 17'; Biggar (1/1) 30'; Priestland (1/1) 68'	Report	Try: Lealiifano 18' c Folau 36' c Tomane 48' c Con: Lealiifano (3/3) 20', 37', 49'; Pen: Lealiifano (3/3) 13', 42', 52'

Millennium Stadium, Cardiff
Attendance: 67,436
Referee: Wayne Barnes (England)

FB	15	Leigh Halfpenny
RW	14	Alex Cuthbert
OC	13	Owen Williams		(substituted off) 50'
IC	12	Scott Williams
LW	11	George North
FH	10	Dan Biggar	(yellow card) 35' to 45'	(substituted off) 63'
SH	9	Mike Phillips		(substituted off) 71'
N8	8	Taulupe Faletau
OF	7	Sam Warburton (c)
BF	6	Dan Lydiate		(substituted off) 63'
RL	5	Ian Evans
LL	4	Alun Wyn Jones
TP	3	Rhodri Jones		(substituted off) 66'
HK	2	Richard Hibbard		(substituted off) 63'
LP	1	Gethin Jenkins		(substituted off) 40'
Replacements:
HK	16	Ken Owens		(substituted on) 63'
PR	17	Ryan Bevington		(substituted on) 40'
PR	18	Samson Lee		(substituted on) 66'
FL	19	Ryan Jones
FL	20	Justin Tipuric		(substituted on) 63'
SH	21	Rhodri Williams		(substituted on) 71'
FH	22	Rhys Priestland		(substituted on) 63'
FB	23	Liam Williams		(substituted on) 50'
Coach:
(New Zealand) Warren Gatland

FB	15	Israel Folau
RW	14	Joe Tomane		(substituted off) 74'
OC	13	Adam Ashley-Cooper
IC	12	Christian Lealiifano		(substituted off) 62'
LW	11	Nick Cummins
FH	10	Quade Cooper	(yellow card) 74' to 80'
SH	9	Will Genia
N8	8	Ben Mowen (c)		(substituted off) 70'
OF	7	Michael Hooper
BF	6	Scott Fardy
RL	5	James Horwill		(substituted off) 60'
LL	4	Rob Simmons
TP	3	Sekope Kepu		(substituted off) 55'
HK	2	Stephen Moore		(substituted off) 70'
LP	1	James Slipper		(substituted off) 63'
Replacements:
HK	16	Tatafu Polota-Nau		(substituted on) 70'
PR	17	Benn Robinson		(substituted on) 63'
PR	18	Ben Alexander		(substituted on) 55'
LK	19	Kane Douglas		(substituted on) 60'
FL	20	Dave Dennis		(substituted on) 70'
SH	21	Nic White
CE	22	Mike Harris		(substituted on) 62'
FB	23	Bernard Foley		(substituted on) 74'
Coach:
(Australia) Ewen McKenzie

Man of the Match:
Quade Cooper (Australia)

Touch judges:
Alain Rolland (Ireland)
John Lacey (Ireland)
Television match official:
Jim Yuille (Scotland)

Notes:

- Quade Cooper earned his 50th test cap for Australia.
- Australia won the James Bevan Trophy for the eighth time and for the sixth time in a row.
- Israel Folau scored his 10th international try of the year in this match, equalling the Australian record set by Lote Tuqiri in 2002.

== Squad ==
Head Coach Ewen McKenzie named a 32-man squad on 11 October 2013.

On 15 October, Peter Betham was added to the squad for the Bledisloe Cup match on 19 October to cover the injured Chris Feauai-Sautia and Joe Tomane, who were ruled out of that test – Betham will not tour Europe. On 20 November, Peter Betham was re-added to the squad following the 5-week ban Tevita Kuridrani received after he was red carded against Ireland.

Note: Caps and date of ages are to opening tour match on 19 October 2013.

Note: Flags indicate national union for the club/province as defined by World Rugby.

Player	Position	Date of birth (age)	Caps	Club/province
Saia Fainga'a	Hooker	2 February 1987 (aged 26)	25	Reds
Stephen Moore	Hooker	20 January 1983 (aged 30)	85	Brumbies
Tatafu Polota-Nau	Hooker	26 July 1985 (aged 28)	44	Waratahs
Ben Alexander	Prop	13 November 1984 (aged 28)	57	Brumbies
Sekope Kepu	Prop	5 February 1986 (aged 27)	32	Waratahs
Benn Robinson	Prop	19 July 1984 (aged 29)	61	Waratahs
Paddy Ryan	Prop	9 August 1988 (aged 25)	1	Waratahs
James Slipper	Prop	6 June 1989 (aged 24)	43	Reds
Kane Douglas	Lock	1 June 1989 (aged 24)	12	Waratahs
James Horwill	Lock	29 May 1985 (aged 28)	42	Reds
Rob Simmons	Lock	19 April 1989 (aged 24)	32	Reds
Sitaleki Timani	Lock	19 September 1986 (aged 27)	13	Waratahs
Dave Dennis	Flanker	10 January 1986 (aged 27)	15	Waratahs
Scott Fardy	Flanker	5 July 1984 (aged 29)	6	Brumbies
Liam Gill	Flanker	8 June 1992 (aged 21)	13	Reds
Michael Hooper	Flanker	29 October 1991 (aged 21)	22	Waratahs
Ben McCalman	Flanker	18 March 1988 (aged 25)	26	Force
Ben Mowen (c)	Number 8	1 December 1984 (aged 28)	9	Brumbies
Will Genia	Scrum-half	17 January 1988 (aged 25)	49	Reds
Nick Phipps	Scrum-half	9 January 1989 (aged 24)	14	Waratahs
Nic White	Scrum-half	13 June 1990 (aged 23)	6	Brumbies
Quade Cooper (vc)	Fly-half	5 April 1988 (aged 25)	44	Reds
Matt To'omua	Fly-half	2 January 1990 (aged 23)	6	Brumbies
Adam Ashley-Cooper	Centre	27 March 1984 (aged 29)	86	Waratahs
Mike Harris	Centre	8 July 1988 (age 38)	8	Reds
Tevita Kuridrani	Centre	31 March 1991 (aged 22)	4	Brumbies
Christian Lealiifano	Centre	24 September 1987 (aged 26)	9	Brumbies
Peter Betham	Wing	6 January 1989 (aged 24)	0	Waratahs
Nick Cummins	Wing	5 October 1987 (aged 26)	8	Force
Chris Feauai-Sautia	Wing	17 November 1993 (aged 19)	1	Reds
Joe Tomane	Wing	2 February 1990 (aged 23)	5	Brumbies
Israel Folau	Fullback	3 April 1989 (aged 24)	9	Waratahs
Bernard Foley	Fullback	8 September 1989 (aged 24)	1	Waratahs

=== Coach staff ===
Head Coach – Ewen McKenzie

Attack Coach – Jim McKay

Defense Coach – Nick Scrivener

Set-piece Coach – Andrew Blades

=== Player statistics ===
Key

- Con: Conversions
- Pen: Penalties
- DG: Drop goals
- Pts: Points

Name	Overall						Cards	
Name	Played	Tries	Con	Pen	DG	Pts	Temporarily suspended	Red card
Quade Cooper	6	1	11	7	1	51	1	0
Christian Lealiifano	4	1	6	7	0	38	0	0
Israel Folau	6	3	0	0	0	15	0	0
Nick Cummins	4	3	0	0	0	15	0	0
Michael Hooper	6	2	0	0	0	10	1	0
Adam Ashley-Cooper	5	2	0	0	0	10	0	0
Tevita Kuridrani	4	2	0	0	0	10	0	1
Joe Tomane	4	2	0	0	0	10	0	0
Matt To'omua	4	2	0	0	0	10	0	0
Ben Mowen	6	1	0	0	0	5	0	0
Chris Feauai-Sautia	1	1	0	0	0	5	0	0
Will Genia	6	0	0	0	0	0	0	0
James Horwill	6	0	0	0	0	0	0	0
Sekope Kepu	6	0	0	0	0	0	0	0
Stephen Moore	6	0	0	0	0	0	0	0
James Slipper	6	0	0	0	0	0	0	0
Ben Alexander	5	0	0	0	0	0	0	0
Benn Robinson	5	0	0	0	0	0	0	0
Rob Simmons	5	0	0	0	0	0	1	0
Sitaleki Timani	5	0	0	0	0	0	0	0
Saia Fainga'a	4	0	0	0	0	0	0	0
Scott Fardy	4	0	0	0	0	0	0	0
Nic White	4	0	0	0	0	0	0	0
Dave Dennis	3	0	0	0	0	0	0	0
Bernard Foley	3	0	0	0	0	0	0	0
Ben McCalman	3	0	0	0	0	0	0	0
Kane Douglas	2	0	0	0	0	0	0	0
Liam Gill	2	0	0	0	0	0	0	0
Mike Harris	2	0	0	0	0	0	0	0
Tatafu Polota-Nau	2	0	0	0	0	0	0	0
Peter Betham	1	0	0	0	0	0	0	0
Paddy Ryan	1	0	0	0	0	0	0	0
Nick Phipps	–	–	–	–	–	0	–	–

=== Team statistics ===
- Scored 179 Points
- Conceded 137 Points
- Scores 20 tries (17 converted)
- Conceded 11 tries
- Conceded 61 penalties

== See also ==
- 2013 end-of-year rugby union tests
