= Australia at the Rugby World Cup =

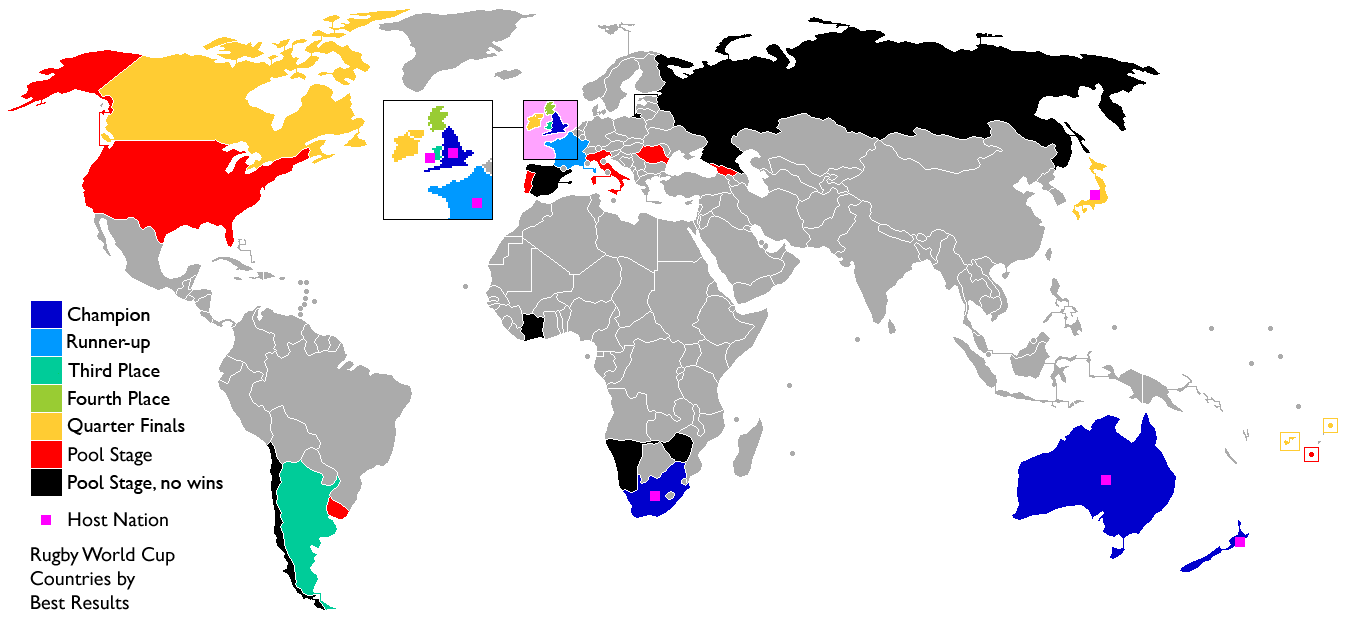
Map of nations best results, excluding nations which unsuccessfully participated in qualifying tournaments

The Australia national rugby union team, known as the Wallabies, has played in all ten Rugby World Cup tournaments. They have won the World Cup on two occasions; only New Zealand and South Africa have won more. Australia has hosted or co-hosted the tournament twice – in 1987 and 2003, and is scheduled to host it in 2027.

== By position ==
Rugby World Cup record									Qualification						
Year	Round	Pld	W	D	L	PF	PA	Squad	Pos	Pld	W	D	L	PF	PA
(New Zealand) (Australia) 1987	Fourth place	6	4	0	2	186	108	Squad	Invited						
(England) (France) (Ireland) (Scotland) (Wales) 1991	Champions	6	6	0	0	126	55	Squad	Automatically qualified						
(South Africa) 1995	Quarter-finals	4	2	0	2	109	66	Squad	Automatically qualified						
(Wales) 1999	Champions	6	6	0	0	221	73	Squad	1st	3	3	0	0	165	33
(Australia) 2003	Runners-up	7	6	0	1	345	78	Squad	Automatically qualified						
(France) 2007	Quarter-finals	5	4	0	1	225	53	Squad	Automatically qualified						
(New Zealand) 2011	Third place	7	5	0	2	211	95	Squad	Automatically qualified						
(England) 2015	Runners-up	7	6	0	1	222	118	Squad	Automatically qualified						
(Japan) 2019	Quarter-finals	5	3	0	2	152	108	Squad	Automatically qualified						
(France) 2023	Pool stage	4	2	0	2	90	91	Squad	Automatically qualified						
(Australia) 2027	Qualified as hosts								Automatically qualified						
(United States) 2031	To be determined								To be determined						
Total	—	57	44	0	13	1887	845	—	—	3	3	0	0	165	33
Champions; Runners–up; Third place; Fourth place; Home venue

== By tournament ==
=== 1987 New Zealand & Australia ===
Pool 1

Team	Pld	W	D	L	PF	PA	PD	T	Pts	Qualification
Australia	3	3	0	0	108	41	+67	18	6	Knockout stage
England	3	2	0	1	100	32	+68	15	4	Knockout stage
United States	3	1	0	2	39	99	−60	5	2	
Japan	3	0	0	3	48	123	−75	7	0	

23 May 1987

Australia	19–6	England
Try: Campese; Poidevin; Con: Lynagh; Pen: Lynagh (3)	Report	Try: Harrison; Con: Webb

Concord Oval, Sydney
Attendance: 17,896
Referee: Keith Lawrence (New Zealand)

31 May 1987

Australia	47–12	United States
Try: Leeds (2) 43'; Penalty try Campese; Smith 24'; Slack 40'; Papworth; Codey; Con: Lynagh (6) 25', 41'; Pen: Lynagh 2'	Report	Try: Nelson 53'; Con: Nelson 54'; Pen: Nelson 32'; Drop: Horton 75'

Ballymore, Brisbane
Attendance: 10,855
Referee: Brian Anderson (Scotland)

3 June 1987

Australia	42–23	Japan
Try: Slack (2); Burke (2); Tuynman; Grigg; Hartill; Campese; Con: Lynagh (5)	Report	Try: Kutsuki (2); Fujita; Con: Okidoi; Pen: Okidoi (2); Drop: Okidoi

Concord Oval, Sydney
Attendance: 8,785
Referee: Jim Fleming (Scotland)

Quarter-final

7 June 1987

Australia	30–24	Ireland
Try: Burke; McIntyre; Smith; Con: Lynagh (4); Pen: Lynagh (3)		Try: Kiernan; MacNeil; Con: Kiernan (2); Pen: Kiernan

Concord Oval, Sydney
Referee: Brian Anderson (New Zealand)

Semi-final

13 June 1987

Australia	24–30	France
Try: Campese; Codey; Con: Lynagh (2); Pen: Lynagh (3); Drop: Lynagh		Try: Lorieux; Sella; Lagisquet; Blanco; Con: Camberabero (4); Pen: Camberabero (2)

Concord Oval, Sydney
Attendance: 17,768
Referee: Brian Anderson (Scotland)

Third place play-off

18 June 1987

Australia	21–22	Wales
Try: Burke; Grigg; Con: Lynagh (2); Pen: Lynagh (2); Drop: Lynagh		Try: Roberts; Moriarty; Hadley; Con: Thorburn (2); Pen: Thorburn (2)

Rotorua International Stadium, Rotorua
Referee: Fred Howard (England)

=== 1991 UK, Ireland and France ===
Pool 3

Team	Pld	W	D	L	PF	PA	PD	Pts
Australia	3	3	0	0	79	25	+54	6
Western Samoa	3	2	0	1	54	34	+20	4
Wales	3	1	0	2	32	61	−29	2
Argentina	3	0	0	3	38	83	−45	0

4 October 1991

Argentina	19–32	Australia
Try: Teran (2); Con: Del Castillo; Pen: Del Castillo; Drop: Arbizu (2)		Try: Campese (2); Horan (2); Kearns; Con: Lynagh (3); Pen: Lynagh (2)

Stradey Park, Llanelli
Referee: Dave Bishop (New Zealand)

9 October 1991

Australia	9–3	Western Samoa
Pen: Lynagh (3)		Pen: Vaea

Pontypool Park, Pontypool
Referee: Ed Morrison (England)

12 October 1991

Wales	3–38	Australia
Pen: Ring		Try: Roebuck (2); Slattery; Campese; Horan; Lynagh; Con: Lynagh (4); Pen: Lynagh (2)

Cardiff Arms Park, Cardiff
Referee: Keith Lawrence (New Zealand)

Quarter-final

20 October 1991

Ireland	18–19	Australia
Try: Hamilton; Con: Keyes; Pen: Keyes (3); Drop: Keyes		Try: Campese (2); Lynagh; Con: Lynagh (2); Pen: Lynagh

Lansdowne Road, Dublin
Referee: Jim Fleming (Scotland)

Semi-final

27 October 1991

Australia	16–6	New Zealand
Try: Campese; Horan; Con: Lynagh; Pen: Lynagh (2)		Pen: Fox (2)

Lansdowne Road, Dublin
Referee: Jim Fleming (Scotland)

Final

27 October 1991

Australia	12–6	England
Try: Daly; Con: Lynagh; Pen: Lynagh (2)		Pen: Webb (2)

Twickenham Stadium, London
Referee: Derek Bevan (Wales)

=== 1995 South Africa ===
Pool A

Team	Pld	W	D	L	PF	PA	PD	Pts
South Africa	3	3	0	0	68	26	+42	9
Australia	3	2	0	1	87	41	+46	7
Canada	3	1	0	2	45	50	−5	5
Romania	3	0	0	3	14	97	−83	3

25 May 1995

South Africa	27–18	Australia
Try: Hendriks; Stransky; Con: Stransky; Pen: Stransky (4); Drop: Stransky		Try: Kearns; Lynagh; Con: Lynagh; Pen: Lynagh

Newlands Stadium, Cape Town
Attendance: 51,000
Referee: Derek Bevan (Wales)

31 May 1995

Australia	27–11	Canada
Try: Lynagh; Tabua; Roff; Con: Lynagh (3); Pen: Lynagh (2)		Try: Charron; Pen: Rees (2)

Boet Erasmus Stadium, Port Elizabeth
Attendance: 15,000
Referee: Patrick Robin (France)

3 June 1995

Australia	42–3	Romania
Try: Smith; Wilson; Roff; Foley; Burke; Con: Burke (2); Eales (4)		Pen: Ivanciuc

Danie Craven Stadium, Stellenbosch
Attendance: 15,000
Referee: Naoki Saito (Japan)

Quarter-final

Australia	22–25	England
Try: Smith; Con: Lynagh; Pen: Lynagh (5)		Try: T. Underwood; Con: Andrew; Pen: Andrew (5); Drop: Andrew

Newlands Stadium, Cape Town
Referee: Dave Bishop (New Zealand)

=== 1999 Wales ===
Pool E

Team	Pld	W	D	L	PF	PA	PD	Pts
Australia	3	3	0	0	135	31	+104	9
Ireland	3	2	0	1	100	45	+55	7
Romania	3	1	0	2	50	126	−76	5
United States	3	0	0	3	52	135	−83	3

3 October 1999

Australia	57–9	Romania
Try: Kefu (3); Roff (2); Kafer; Burke; Little; Horan; Con: Burke (5); Eales		Pen: Mitu (3)

Ravenhill Stadium, Belfast
Referee: Paul Honiss (New Zealand)

10 October 1999

Ireland	3–23	Australia
Pen: Humphreys		Try: Tune; Horan; Con: Burke (2); Pen: Burke (2); Eales

Lansdowne Road, Dublin
Referee: Clayton Thomas (Wales)

14 October 1999

Australia	55–19	United States
Try: Staniforth (2); Latham; Whitaker; Foley; Burke; Larkham; Strauss; Con: Burke (5); Roff; Pen: Burke		Try: Grobler; Con: Dalzell; Pen: Dalzell (4)

Thomond Park, Limerick
Referee: André Watson (South Africa)

Quarter-final

23 October 1999

Wales	9–24	Australia
Pen: Jenkins (3)		Try: Gregan (2); Tune; Con: Burke (3); Pen: Burke

Millennium Stadium, Cardiff
Attendance: 74,499
Referee: Colin Hawke (New Zealand)

Semi-final

30 October 1999

South Africa	21–27 (a.e.t.)	Australia
Pen: De Beer (6); Drop: De Beer		Pen: Burke (8); Drop: Larkham

Twickenham Stadium, London
Attendance: 75,000
Referee: Derek Bevan (Wales)

Final

6 November 1999

Australia	35–12	France
Try: Tune; Finegan; Con: Burke (2); Pen: Burke (7)		Pen: Lamaison (4)

Millennium Stadium, Cardiff
Attendance: 74,500
Referee: André Watson (South Africa)

=== 2003 Australia ===
Pool A

Team	Pld	W	D	L	PF	PA	PD	BP	Pts	Qualification
Australia	4	4	0	0	273	32	+241	2	18	Quarter-finals
Ireland	4	3	0	1	141	56	+85	3	15	Quarter-finals
Argentina	4	2	0	2	140	57	+83	3	11	
Romania	4	1	0	3	65	192	−127	1	5	
Namibia	4	0	0	4	28	310	−282	0	0	

10 October 2003

Australia	24–8	Argentina
Try: Sailor 20'; Roff 74'; Con: Flatley; Pen: Flatley (4)		Try: Corleto 72'; Pen: M. Contepomi

Stadium Australia, Sydney
Attendance: 81,350
Referee: Paul Honiss (New Zealand)

18 October 2003

Australia	90–8	Romania
Try: Flatley; Rogers (3); Burke (2); Larkham (2); Mortlock; Roff; Giteau; Tuqiri; Smith; Con: Flatley (11); Pen: Flatley		Try: Toderașc; Pen: Tofan

Lang Park, Brisbane
Attendance: 48,778
Referee: Pablo De Luca (Argentina)

25 October 2003

Australia	142–0	Namibia
Try: Latham (5); Lyons; Mortlock; Tuqiri (3); Penalty try Rogers (2); Paul; Giteau (3); Grey; Turinui (2); Burke; Roe; Con: Rogers (16)

Adelaide Oval, Adelaide
Attendance: 33,000
Referee: Joël Jutge (France)

1 November 2003

Australia	17–16	Ireland
Try: Smith; Pen: Flatley (3); Drop: Gregan		Try: O'Driscoll; Con: O'Gara; Pen: O'Gara (2); Drop: O'Driscoll

Docklands Stadium, Melbourne
Attendance: 54,206
Referee: Paddy O'Brien (New Zealand)

Quarter-final

8 November 2003

Australia	33–16	Scotland
Try: Gregan; Lyons; Mortlock; Con: Flatley (3); Pen: Flatley (4)		Try: Russell; Con: Paterson; Pen: Paterson (2); Drop: Paterson

Lang Park, Brisbane
Referee: Steve Walsh (New Zealand)

Semi-final

November 2003

Australia	22–10	New Zealand
Try: Mortlock 9' c Con: Flatley; Pen: Flatley (5)		Try: Thorne 35' c Con: MacDonald; Pen: MacDonald

Stadium Australia, Sydney
Attendance: 82,444
Referee: Chris White (England)

Final

22 November 2003

Australia	17–20 (a.e.t.)	England
Try: Tuqiri; Pen: Elton Flatley (4)		Try: Robinson; Pen: Wilkinson (4); Drop: Wilkinson

Stadium Australia, Sydney
Attendance: 82,957
Referee: André Watson (South Africa)

=== 2007 France ===
Pos	Team	Pld	W	D	L	PF	PA	PD	B	Pts	Qualification
1	Australia	4	4	0	0	215	41	+174	4	20	Qualified for the quarter-finals
2	Fiji	4	3	0	1	114	136	−22	3	15	Qualified for the quarter-finals
3	Wales	4	2	0	2	168	105	+63	4	12	Eliminated, automatic qualification for RWC 2011
4	Japan	4	0	1	3	64	210	−146	1	3	
5	Canada	4	0	1	3	51	120	−69	0	2	

8 September 2007

Australia	91–3	Japan
Try: Elsom (3); Latham (2); Barnes (2); Mitchell; Smith; Ashley-Cooper; Sharpe; Freier; Con: Mortlock (7); Giteau (3); Pen: Mortlock		Pen: Ono

Stade de Gerland, Lyon
Referee: Alan Lewis (Ireland)

15 September 2007

Australia	32–20	Wales
Try: Latham (2); Giteau; Mortlock; Con: Mortlock (2); Giteau; Pen: Mortlock (2); Drop: Barnes		Try: J. Thomas; S. Williams; Con: Hook; Pen: S. Jones; Hook (2)

Millennium Stadium, Cardiff
Referee: Steve Walsh (New Zealand)

23 September 2007

Australia	55–12	Fiji
Try: Mitchell (3); Giteau (2); Ashley-Cooper; Hoiles; Con: Giteau (4); Pen: Giteau (3); Drop: Barnes		Try: Neivua; Ratuva; Con: Bai

Stade de la Mosson, Montpellier
Referee: Nigel Owens (Wales)

29 September 2007

Australia	37–6	Canada
Try: Mitchell (2); Baxter; Freier; Smith; Latham; Con: Shepherd (2); Pen: Huxley		Pen: Pritchard (2)

Stade Chaban-Delmas, Bordeaux
Referee: Chris White (England)

Quarter-final

6 October 2007

Australia	10–12	England
Try: Tuqiri; Con: Mortlock; Pen: Mortlock		Pen: Wilkinson (4)

Stade Vélodrome, Marseille
Referee: Alain Rolland (Ireland)

=== 2011 New Zealand ===
Pool C

Pos	Team	Pld	W	D	L	PF	PA	PD	T	B	Pts	Qualification
1	Ireland	4	4	0	0	135	34	+101	15	1	17	Advanced to the quarter-finals and qualified for the 2015 Rugby World Cup
2	Australia	4	3	0	1	173	48	+125	25	3	15	Advanced to the quarter-finals and qualified for the 2015 Rugby World Cup
3	Italy	4	2	0	2	92	95	−3	13	2	10	Eliminated but qualified for 2015 Rugby World Cup
4	United States	4	1	0	3	38	122	−84	4	0	4	
5	Russia	4	0	0	4	57	196	−139	8	1	1	

11 September 2011
15:30

Australia	32–6	Italy
Try: Alexander 50' m Ashley-Cooper 55' c O'Connor 58' c Ioane 66' c Con: O'Connor (3/4); Pen: Cooper (2/3) 19', 30'	Report	Pen: Mi. Bergamasco (2/3) 38', 40+'

North Harbour Stadium, Auckland
Attendance: 25,731
Referee: Alain Rolland (Ireland)

17 September 2011
20:30

Australia	6–15	Ireland
Pen: O'Connor (2/4) 11', 23'	Report	Pen: Sexton (2/5) 17', 49'; O'Gara (2/2) 62', 71'; Drop: Sexton 19'

Eden Park, Auckland
Attendance: 58,678
Referee: Bryce Lawrence (New Zealand)

23 September 2011
20:30

Australia	67–5	United States
Try: Horne 8' m Elsom 11' m Beale 31' c Fainga'a (2) 35' m, 71' m Mitchell 45'c McCabe 48' m Ashley-Cooper (3) 59' c, 64' c, 66' c Samo 78' c Con: Cooper (2/5); Barnes (4/5)	Report	Try: Gagiano 23' m

Wellington Regional Stadium, Wellington
Attendance: 33,824
Referee: Nigel Owens (Wales)

1 October 2011
15:30

Australia	68–22	Russia
Try: Barnes (2) 7' m, 79' c Mitchell (2) 9' c, 49' c McCalman 12' c Pocock (2) 15' c, 22' c Moore 36' c Ashley-Cooper 39' c Ma'afu 42' c Con: O'Connor (9/10)	Report	Try: Ostroushko 33' m Simplikevich 60' c Rachkov 68' c Con: Rachkov (2/2); Drop: Rachkov (1/1) 47'

Trafalgar Park, Nelson
Attendance: 16,307
Referee: Bryce Lawrence (New Zealand)

Quarter-final

9 October 2011
18:00 NZDT (UTC+13)

South Africa	9–11	Australia
Pen: Steyn (2/4) 39', 56'; Drop: Steyn (1/1) 60'	Report	Try: Horwill 11' m Pen: O'Connor (2/2) 17', 72'

Wellington Regional Stadium, Wellington
Referee: Bryce Lawrence (New Zealand)

Semi-final

16 October 2011
20:30

New Zealand	20–6	Australia
Try: Nonu; Pen: Weepu; Drop: Cruden		Pen: O'Connor; Drop: Cooper

Eden Park, Auckland
Referee: Craig Joubert (South Africa)

Third place play-off

21 October 2011
20:30 NZDT (UTC+13)

Wales	18–21	Australia
Try: Shane Williams 50' m Halfpenny 80+' c Con: S. Jones (1/1); Pen: Hook (1/2) 20'; S. Jones (1/1) 71'	Tracker	Try: Barnes 12' c McCalman 76' m Con: O'Connor (1/2); Pen: O'Connor (2/4) 54', 58'; Drop: Barnes (1/1) 68'

Eden Park, Auckland
Attendance: 53,014
Referee: Wayne Barnes (England)

=== 2015 England ===
Pool A

Pos	Team	Pld	W	D	L	PF	PA	PD	T	B	Pts	Qualification
1	Australia	4	4	0	0	141	35	+106	17	1	17	Advanced to the quarter-finals and qualified for the 2019 Rugby World Cup
2	Wales	4	3	0	1	111	62	+49	11	1	13	Advanced to the quarter-finals and qualified for the 2019 Rugby World Cup
3	England	4	2	0	2	133	75	+58	16	3	11	Eliminated but qualified for 2019 Rugby World Cup
4	Fiji	4	1	0	3	84	101	−17	10	1	5	
5	Uruguay	4	0	0	4	30	226	−196	2	0	0	

23 September 2015
16:45

Australia	28–13	Fiji
Try: Pocock (2) 26' c, 31' m Kepu 43' c Con: Foley (2/3) 28', 44'; Pen: Foley (3/3) 10', 38', 70'	Report	Try: Volavola 60' c Con: Nadolo (1/1) 61'; Pen: Nadolo (2/2) 21', 47'

Millennium Stadium, Cardiff
Attendance: 67,253
Referee: Glen Jackson (New Zealand)

27 September 2015
12:00

Australia	65–3	Uruguay
Try: McMahon (2) 7' m, 69' m Tomane 9' c Mumm 26' m Speight 31' c McCalman (2) 36' c, 61' c Mitchell (2) 47' m, 52' m To'omua 71' m Kuridrani 80' c Con: Cooper (5/11) 10', 32', 36', 62', 80'	Report	Pen: Berchesi (1/1) 24'

Villa Park, Birmingham
Attendance: 39,605
Referee: Pascal Gaüzère (France)

3 October 2015
20:00

England	13–33	Australia
Try: Watson 56' c Con: Farrell (1/1) 57'; Pen: Farrell (2/2) 13', 65'	Report	Try: Foley (2) 20' c, 35' c Giteau 80' c Con: Foley (3/3) 22', 36', 80'; Pen: Foley (4/4) 8', 50', 72', 76'

Twickenham Stadium, London
Attendance: 81,010
Referee: Romain Poite (France)

10 October 2015
16:45

Australia	15–6	Wales
Pen: Foley (5/6) 25', 31', 37', 51', 73'	Report	Pen: Biggar (2/3) 5', 34'

Twickenham Stadium, London
Attendance: 80,863
Referee: Craig Joubert (South Africa)

Quarter-final

18 October 2015
16:00 BST (UTC+01)

Australia	35–34	Scotland
Try: Ashley-Cooper 9' m Mitchell (2) 30' m, 43' c Hooper 40' m Kuridrani 64' c Con: Foley (2/5) 44', 65'; Pen: Foley (2/2) 54', 80'	Report	Try: Horne 18' c Seymour 59' m Bennett 74' c Con: Laidlaw (2/3) 19', 75'; Pen: Laidlaw (5/5) 14', 21', 34', 47', 69'

Twickenham Stadium, London
Attendance: 77,110
Referee: Craig Joubert (South Africa)

Semi-final

25 October 2015
16:00 GMT (UTC+00)

Argentina	15–29	Australia
Pen: Sánchez (5/5) 7', 24', 36', 45', 55'	Report	Try: Simmons 2' c Ashley-Cooper (3) 10' c, 32' m, 72' c Con: Foley (3/4) 3', 11', 73'; Pen: Foley (1/2) 48'

Twickenham Stadium, London
Attendance: 80,025
Referee: Wayne Barnes (England)

Final

31 October 2015
16:00 GMT (UTC+00)

New Zealand	34–17	Australia
Try: Milner-Skudder 39' c Nonu 42' m Barrett 79' c Con: Carter (2/3) 40', 80'; Pen: Carter (4/4) 8', 27', 36', 75'; Drop: Carter 70'	Report	Try: Pocock 53'; Kuridrani 64' c Con: Foley (2/2) 54', 65'; Pen: Foley (1/1) 14'

Twickenham Stadium, London
Attendance: 80,125
Referee: Nigel Owens (Wales)

=== 2019 Japan ===
Pos	Team	Pld	W	D	L	PF	PA	PD	T	B	Pts	Qualification
1	Wales	4	4	0	0	136	69	+67	17	3	19	Advanced to the quarter-finals and qualified for the 2023 Rugby World Cup
2	Australia	4	3	0	1	136	68	+68	20	4	16	Advanced to the quarter-finals and qualified for the 2023 Rugby World Cup
3	Fiji	4	1	0	3	110	108	+2	17	3	7	Eliminated but qualified for 2023 Rugby World Cup
4	Georgia	4	1	0	3	65	122	−57	9	1	5	
5	Uruguay	4	1	0	3	60	140	−80	6	0	4	

21 September 2019
13:45 JST (UTC+09)

(1 BP) Australia	39–21	Fiji
Try: Hooper 18' c Hodge 36' m Latu (2) 57' m, 62' m Kerevi 69' c Koroibete 73' c Con: Lealiifano (1/2) 19'; To'omua (2/3) 70', 74'; Pen: Hodge (1/1) 51'	Report	Try: Yato 9' m Nayacalevu 44' c Con: Volavola (1/2) 46'; Pen: Volavola (3/3) 5', 23', 31'

Sapporo Dome, Sapporo
Attendance: 36,482
Referee: Ben O'Keeffe (New Zealand)

29 September 2019
16:45 JST (UTC+09)

(1 BP) Australia	25–29	Wales
Try: Ashley-Cooper 21' m Haylett-Petty 46' c Hooper 62' c Con: To'omua (2/2) 48', 63'; Pen: Foley (1/1) 29'; To'omua (1/1) 68'	Report	Try: Parkes 13' c G. Davies 38' c Con: Biggar (1/1) 14'; Patchell (1/1) 39'; Pen: Patchell (3/3) 33', 37', 72'; Drop: Biggar (1/2) 1'; Patchell (1/1) 44'

Ajinomoto Stadium, Chōfu
Attendance: 47,885
Referee: Romain Poite (France)

5 October 2019
14:15 JST (UTC+09)

(1 BP) Australia	45–10	Uruguay
Try: Haylett-Petty (2) 6' c, 68' m Petaia 24' c Kuridrani (2) 31' m, 46' c Genia 53' c Slipper 61' c Con: Lealiifano (5/7) 7', 25', 48', 55', 63'	Report	Try: Diana 79' c Con: Berchesi (1/1) 79'; Pen: Berchesi (1/1) 13'

Oita Stadium, Ōita
Attendance: 33,781
Referee: Mathieu Raynal (France)

11 October 2019
19:15 JST (UTC+09)

(1 BP) Australia	27–8	Georgia
Try: White 23' c Koroibete 60' c Dempsey 75' m Genia 79' m Con: To'omua (2/4) 24', 61'; Pen: To'omua (1/1) 37'	Report	Try: Todua 70' m Pen: Matiashvili (1/1) 28'

Shizuoka Stadium, Fukuroi
Attendance: 39,802
Referee: Pascal Gaüzère (France)

Quarter-final

19 October 2019
16:15 JST (UTC+09)

England	40–16	Australia
Try: May (2) 18' c, 21' c Sinckler 46' c Watson 76' c Con: Farrell (4/4) 19', 23', 47', 77'; Pen: Farrell (4/4) 30', 51', 66', 73'	Report	Try: Koroibete 43' c Con: Lealiifano (1/1) 44'; Pen: Lealiifano (3/3) 12', 26', 41'

Ōita Stadium, Ōita
Attendance: 36,954
Referee: Jérôme Garcès (France)

== Hosting ==
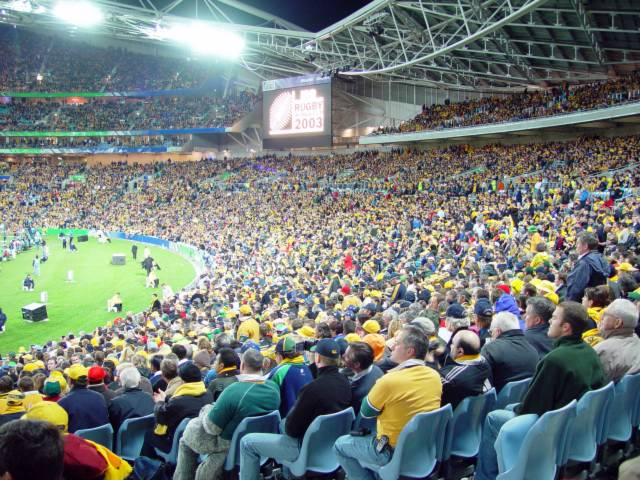
The opening game at Stadium Australia between Australia and Argentina in 2003.

=== 1987 ===
Australia hosted the first Rugby World Cup in 1987 along with New Zealand. Two stadiums in Australia were used.

City	Stadium	Capacity
Brisbane	Ballymore Stadium	24,000
Sydney	Concord Oval	20,000

Most of the pool games were in New Zealand, but the semi-finals, and one of the quarter-finals, were played in Australia.

=== 2003 ===
Australia won the right to host the World Cup in 2003 without the involvement of New Zealand after a contractual dispute over ground signage rights between the New Zealand Rugby Football Union and Rugby World Cup Limited. The overall stadium capacity was reduced from the 1999 Rugby World Cup in Wales.

The Adelaide Oval underwent a A$20 million redevelopment for the 2003 Rugby World Cup, financed entirely by the South Australian Cricket Association, with two new grandstands built adjacent to the Victor Richardson Gates. Lang Park in Brisbane was a new venue designed specifically for rugby, built at a cost of A$280 million, and was opened just before the start of the 2003 World Cup. The Central Coast Stadium was also a newly built venue, and opened in February 2000 at a cost of A$30 million.

The Sydney Football Stadium was one of two venues in Sydney that were used for football during the 2000 Olympic Games. The other venue in Sydney was the Stadium Australia which was the centrepiece of the 2000 Olympic Games. Also known as Stadium Australia, Telstra Stadium was built at a cost of over A$600 million and was the biggest stadium used in the 2003 World Cup. The only stadium with a retractable roof used was the Docklands Stadium in Melbourne.

Stadium	Games	City	State	Capacity	Highest attendance
Stadium Australia	7	Sydney	New South Wales	83,500	82,957 (Final: Australia vs England)
Sydney Football Stadium	5	Sydney	New South Wales	41,159	37,137 (Scotland vs. Fiji)
Central Coast Stadium	3	Gosford	New South Wales	20,119	19,653 (Japan vs. United States)
Wollongong Showground	2	Wollongong	New South Wales	18,484	17,833 (France vs. United States)
Lang Park	9	Brisbane	Queensland	52,500	48,778 (Australia vs. Romania)
Willows Sports Complex	3	Townsville	Queensland	24,843	21,309 (France vs. Japan)
Docklands Stadium	7	Melbourne	Victoria	53,371	54,206 (Australia vs. Ireland)
Subiaco Oval	5	Perth	Western Australia	42,922	38,834 (South Africa vs. England)
Canberra Stadium	4	Canberra	Australian Capital Territory	24,647	22,641 (Italy vs. Wales)
Adelaide Oval	2	Adelaide	South Australia	33,597	33,000 (Australia vs. Namibia)
York Park	1	Launceston	Tasmania	19,891	15,457 (Namibia vs. Romania)

Australia intended to bid for the 2015 and 2019 Rugby World Cups, but withdrew from the bidding. The bids were awarded to England and Japan respectively.

=== 2027 ===
Australia won their bid to host the 2027 Rugby World Cup on 12 May 2022. The tournament will take place between 10 September and 27 October, 2027.

== Overall record ==
Opponent	Played	Win	Draw	Lost	Win %
Argentina	3	3	0	0	100%
Canada	2	2	0	0	100%
England	7	3	0	4	43%
Fiji	4	3	0	1	75%
France	2	1	0	1	50%
Georgia	2	2	0	0	100%
Ireland	5	4	0	1	80%
Italy	1	1	0	0	100%
Japan	2	2	0	0	100%
Namibia	1	1	0	0	100%
New Zealand	4	2	0	2	50%
Portugal	1	1	0	0	100%
Romania	3	3	0	0	100%
Russia	1	1	0	0	100%
Samoa	1	1	0	0	100%
Scotland	2	2	0	0	100%
South Africa	3	2	0	1	67%
United States	3	3	0	0	100%
Uruguay	2	2	0	0	100%
Wales	8	5	0	3	71%
Overall	57	44	0	13	79%

== Team records ==
Most points in a tournament

- 345 – 2003
- 225 – 2007
- 222 – 2015
- 221 – 1999
- 211 – 2011

Most points in a game

- 142 – vs Namibia, 2003
- 91 – vs Japan, 2007
- 90 – vs Romania, 2003
- 68 – vs Russia, 2011
- 67 – vs United States, 2011
- 66 – vs Namibia, 2015
- 57 – vs Romania, 1999
- 55 – vs United States, 1999
- 55 – vs Fiji, 2007

== Individual records ==
Most World Cup matches

- 21 – James Slipper (2011, 2015, 2019, 2023)
- 20 – George Gregan (1995, 1999, 2003, 2007)
- 19 – Adam Ashley-Cooper (2007, 2011, 2015, 2019)

Most points overall

- 195 – Michael Lynagh (1987, 1991, 1995)
- 125 – Matt Burke (1995, 1999)
- 100 – Elton Flatley (2003)
- 85 – Bernard Foley (2015, 2019)
- 70 – Drew Mitchell (2007, 2011, 2015)
- 65 – Matt Giteau (2003, 2007, 2011, 2015)
- 60 – Adam Ashley-Cooper (2007, 2011, 2015, 2019)

Most individual points in a game

- 42 – Mat Rogers vs Namibia, 2003
- 30 – Elton Flatley vs Romania, 2003
- 28 – Bernard Foley vs England, 2015
- 27 – Matt Giteau vs Fiji, 2007
- 25 – Matt Burke vs France, 1999
- 25 – Chris Latham vs Namibia, 2003
- 25 – Ben Donaldson vs Georgia, 2023

Most tries overall

- 14 – Drew Mitchell (2007, 2011, 2015)
- 12 – Adam Ashley-Cooper (2007, 2011, 2015, 2019)
- 11 – Chris Latham (1999, 2003, 2007)
- 10 – David Campese (1987, 1991, 1995)
- 8 – Matt Giteau (2003, 2007, 2011, 2015)
- 7 – Joe Roff (1995, 1999)

Most tries in a game

- 5 – Chris Latham vs Namibia, 2003
- 3 – Toutai Kefu vs Romania, 1999
- 3 – Mat Rogers vs Romania, 2003
- 3 – Lote Tuqiri vs Namibia, 2003
- 3 – Matt Giteau vs Namibia, 2003
- 3 – Rocky Elsom vs Japan, 2003
- 3 – Drew Mitchell vs Fiji, 2007
- 3 – Adam Ashley-Cooper vs United States, 2011
- 3 – Adam Ashley-Cooper vs Argentina, 2015

Most penalty goals overall

- 33 – Michael Lynagh (1987, 1991, 1995)
- 21 – Elton Flatley (1999, 2003)
- 19 – Matt Burke (1995, 1999)
- 17 – Bernard Foley (2015, 2019)
- 7 – James O'Connor (2011)
- 7 – Ben Donaldson (2023)

Most penalty goals in a game

- 8 – Matt Burke vs South Africa, 1999
- 7 – Matt Burke vs France, 1999
- 5 – Michael Lynagh vs England, 1995
- 5 – Elton Flatley vs New Zealand, 2003

Most drop goals

- 3 – Berrick Barnes (2007, 2011)
- 2 – Michael Lynagh (1987, 1991, 1995)
- 1 – George Gregan (1995, 1999, 2003, 2007)
- 1 – Stephen Larkham (1999, 2003, 2007)
- 1 – Quade Cooper (2011)

== Portrayal on screen ==
Australia can be seen playing South Africa in the feature film Invictus based on the 1995 Rugby World Cup.
