= Ewen McKenzie =

Australia international rugby union player

- Born: Ewen James McKenzie; 21 June 1965 (age 61) Melbourne, Victoria, Australia
- School: Scotch College, Melbourne
- University: University of New South Wales

Rugby union career
- Position: Prop
Senior career
Years	Team	Apps	(Points)
1987–1995	Randwick		
–	Melbourne Harlequins		
–	Paris Université Club		
Provincial / State sides
Years	Team	Apps	(Points)
1996–1997	Brumbies	36	
1987–1995	Waratahs	37	
Super Rugby
Years	Team	Apps	(Points)
1996–1997	Brumbies	36	
International career
Years	Team	Apps	(Points)
1990–1997	Australia	51	(9)
Coaching career
- Years: Team
- 2005: Australia A
- 2003–2008: Waratahs
- 2008–2009: Stade Français
- 2010–2013: Queensland Reds
- 2013–2014: Australia

Ewen James Andrew McKenzie (born 21 June 1965) is an Australian professional rugby union coach and a former player. A prop, he played for Australia's World Cup winning team in 1991 and earned 51 caps for the Wallabies during his test career. He played nine seasons for the NSW Waratahs and two for the ACT Brumbies.

McKenzie was head coach of the Australia team from 2013 to 2014. He has coached in Super Rugby for the Waratahs and Reds, and in France at Top 14 side Stade Français.

== Early life ==
Born in Melbourne, McKenzie was educated at Scotch College, Melbourne and at the University of New South Wales.

== Playing career ==
=== Waratahs and Brumbies ===
McKenzie played prop for the New South Wales Waratahs 37 times between 1987 and 1995, before joining the Brumbies in 1996, for the inaugural Super 12 season. He played 36 times for the Canberra-based team until 1997, playing in the 1997 Super 12 final against the Auckland Blues, who won that match 23–7 at Eden Park.

=== Australia ===
McKenzie was the second Victorian born and bred player to represent Australia after the great Sir Edward "Weary" Dunlop. He played for the Wallabies 51 times, earning his first cap in 21–9 victory over France on 9 June 1990 at the Sydney Football Stadium. He started every match of the 1990 French tour to Australia, winning the test series 2–1. His first major test series was the Bledisloe Cup series in August 1990. The All Blacks won the trophy with a 2–1 series win. McKenzie was part of the Australian side that claimed the 1991 Rugby World Cup, beating the All Blacks in the semi-final with a famous 16–6 victory at Lansdowne Road, before taking the cup with a 12–6 victory over England in the final at Twickenham, where he formed a formidable front row alongside Tony Daly and Phil Kearns.

In 1992, McKenzie travelled to Cape Town with the Wallabies to play the Springboks for the first time in 22 years. Australia defeated South Africa convincingly by 26–3. The previous month, McKenzie had won his first Bledisloe Cup series, beating the All Blacks 2–1 with a 19–17 victory at Ballymore, and a 16–15 victory at the Sydney Football Stadium. In the space of twelve months, the Australians won the World Cup and beaten the four home nations and South Africa and New Zealand.

The Wallabies were unable to retain the Bledisloe a year later after a 25–10 loss at Carisbrook. However, McKenzie was part of the team that beat South Africa for just the second time in a series on Australian soil with a 2–1 win over the Springboks during their 1993 tour of Australia. In 1994, the Wallabies won all 6 games they played in that year, with McKenzie starting in all 6 games. He was part of the 1995 Rugby World Cup squad, but was unable to retain their 1991 title following a 25–22 loss to England in the Quarter Finals at Cape Town.

In 1996, McKenzie played just two games of the Wallabies season, which were part of the 1996 Welsh tour of Australia. He missed the inaugural series of the Tri nations, but was reselected in 1997 for the 1997 French tour of Australia. 1997 was the year McKenzie retired from international rugby, making his last appearance on 12 July 1997 after a 25–6 victory over England in Sydney. In his entire career of 51 test matches, he only ever played as a substitute once, during a pool game in the 1995 Rugby World Cup.

=== World XV ===
In 1992, played with the World XV to mark the centenary of the New Zealand Rugby Union. New Zealand won the series 2–1, with a 54–26 win at Wellington and a 26–15 win at Auckland. The World XV's only win was the opening match, where they secured a 28–14 win.

=== Honours ===
- Rugby World Cup / Webb Ellis Cup
  - Winner: 1991
- Bledisloe Cup
  - Winner: 1992, 1994
- Trophée des Bicentenaires
  - Winner: 1990, 1993, 1997
- Cook Cup
  - Winner: 1997
- Super 12
  - Runner-up: 1997 (Brumbies)

== Coaching career ==
Following his retirement from playing in 1997, McKenzie has coached at many different levels. He has coached both in the Southern Hemisphere and the Northern Hemisphere, taking on different roles of coaching. He began with the Brumbies in 1998 as a coaching co-ordinator before spending three years with the Wallabies as an assistant coach to Rod Macqueen and Eddie Jones. His success as an assistant landed him a role as head coach of the Waratahs, where his five-year tenure makes him the longest serving coach of the Sydney-based team. During this time he also briefly coached the Australia A side. McKenzie then joined French team Stade Français for the 2008–09 season.

He returned home in 2009 and took up the role as director of rugby for the Queensland Reds. He coached the Reds for four seasons from 2010 to 2013 before stepping down to pursue international opportunities. He was heavily linked with the head coaching positions of Scotland and Ireland, but it was the Wallabies McKenzie wanted to coach. On 8 July 2013, McKenzie was named head coach of the Wallabies succeeding Robbie Deans. After fifteen months in charge, McKenzie resigned as coach of the Wallabies on 18 October 2014.

=== Assistant coach of Australia ===
In 2000, he joined the Wallabies coaching set-up as an assistant coach to Rod Macqueen until 2001, when Macqueen stepped down as head coach, and Eddie Jones took over. During this time, McKenzie and Macqueen led Australia to their first Tri Nations title in 2000. In addition to this, they also helped the national team to their third successive Bledisloe Cup triumph, dating back to 1998. He also helped the Wallabies to a 2–1 series win over the British & Irish Lions, before again retaining the Bledisloe Cup through to 2003. During this time, Jones succeeded Macqueen and joined McKenzie to lead the team to their second Tri Nations title in 2001. McKenzie's last duties as assistant coach was during the 2003 Rugby World Cup, when Australia lost the final to England in extra time.

=== New South Wales Waratahs ===
In November 2003, McKenzie succeeded Bob Dwyer as head coach of the New South Wales Waratahs. He led the team to the 2005 Super 12 final, lost 35–25 to the Crusaders, in his second year at the helm, and to the semi-final in 2006, lost 16–14 to the Hurricanes, before reaching the final again in 2008, where he lost again to the Crusaders 20–12. Despite not coaching the Waratahs at current, he is the Waratahs longest serving coach in history.

=== Stade Français ===
Following a successful 5-year tenure with the NSW Waratahs, McKenzie joined French club Stade Français in 2008, taking the side to the semi-final in the first year in charge – Stade Français lost to Perpignan 25–21 in that semi-final.

=== Queensland Reds ===
On 9 October 2009 it was announced that McKenzie was leaving France to return home to Australia, and that he was taking over the coaching job of the Queensland Reds in the Super 14, succeeding Phil Mooney. He became the club's seventh coach in 11 years. During his first year as Queensland Reds Director of Rugby in 2010, he took the side to 5th in the table, a significant rise from previous positions of the bottom 5 in the table. The 5th-place positioning, was the Reds highest position since 2002.

That success continued into 2011 when the Reds triumphed to win their first Super Rugby Championship in the professional Rugby era, beating the Crusaders 18–13 at Suncorp. Having devised a brand of rugby that received international acclaim, the Reds topped the regular season with 13 victories and just 3 losses. McKenzie then guided the Reds to victory over the Blues in the semi-final and Crusaders in the final to score their first title since 1995.

McKenzie successfully transformed the Reds into the powerhouse rugby province of Australia, with the team's second straight conference title in 2012 coming only a year after guiding the team to their maiden Super Rugby championship. However, the Reds were unable to retain their title, following a heavy home defeat of 30–17 to the Sharks in the Qualifying finals round.

In his first three years at the helm, McKenzie contributed to the Reds winning every major piece of available silverware, with the only trophy to elude the team during his opening two campaigns – the Rod Macqueen Cup – making its way to Queensland for the first time in 2012. Two successive victories over the Brumbies were the catalyst behind the Reds 2012 success as they again dominated their Australian rivals by winning seven of their eight matches against domestic opposition. Among other firsts, the Reds also claimed their maiden win at Eden Park.

Prior to McKenzie's tenure, the Reds had been through several poor seasons. Despite the expansive style of rugby introduced by previous head coach Phil Mooney, the team had remained in the bottom half of the table. The side was transformed under McKenzie, still playing entertaining rugby but with a greatly improved win–loss ratio.

==== Media commentary and succession planning ====
By 2012, McKenzie's coaching had become a regular subject of the Fairfax's Sydney Morning Herald. In February that year Greg Growden outlined McKenzie's plan to "select a faster, more mobile forward pack" for the Super Rugby season opener against the Waratahs in Sydney.

McKenzie, in his own column in the Sydney Morning Herald, shared his coaching insights. In April, he first he discussed the challenges incorporating a new player into an unfamiliar playing environment. A week later he explained, "The decision [by Queensland Rugby] to recruit Richard Graham from the Western Force was a proactive one made ... to ensure we can sustain ongoing success both with the Reds and in the community game." Later he reported being asked about the strengths of the Australian conference relative to the South African and New Zealand conferences. In response he said: "I have found this year's competition to be one of the tightest in memory and this is more of a reflection on the strength of play from all teams as opposed to any perceived weaknesses." In May, he reflected on the coaches' challenges of negotiating player contracts.

On 19 March 2013, McKenzie announced he was to stand down as Queensland Reds head coach at the end of the 2013 Super Rugby season to further his hopes at coaching at international level. Following the announcement, he was linked to the then vacant Ireland job, as well as the vacant Scotland job. However, despite the links and meetings with other unions, it was the Wallabies job he wanted, which he landed on 8 July 2013. Although he wasn't set to take over the Wallabies job until 4 August, his reign at Queensland Reds ended on 20 July following a 38–9 defeat to the Crusaders in the Qualifiers of the 2013 season, allowing him to turn his attention to Australia 2 weeks earlier than expected.

=== Head coach of Australia ===
==== First Season: 2013 ====
On 8 July 2013, following the resignation of Robbie Deans after a test series defeat to the British & Irish Lions, McKenzie was expected to be selected as Wallabies coach. He was officially named Wallabies coach to replace Robbie Deans on 9 July 2013, and said that he would start his duties with Australia as soon as his job was completed at the Queensland Reds.

His first match in charge was a 47–29 loss to New Zealand at ANZ Stadium in the opening fixture of the 2013 Rugby Championship. In this match he gave five debutants their first cap, including Matt To'omua being named at fly-Half ahead of Quade Cooper. To'omua was the first Wallaby to make his debut against New Zealand in the starting XV since Rod Kafer in 1999. The 27–16 loss a week later, meant the Bledisloe Cup would stay with New Zealand for the 11th year in a row.

McKenzie then led the team to a 38–12 defeat by South Africa in Brisbane, which was the Wallabies' largest losing margin to the Springboks in Australia. The next match was a 14–13 win over Argentina in a game hampered by heavy winds and rain in Perth, and it was McKenzie's first taste of victory as an international coach. In the away fixture against South Africa in Cape Town, the Wallabies lost again to the Springboks, 28–8.

Australia's final fixture of the Championship saw the Wallabies earn their first bonus point win of the season with a record 54–17 win. This was the most points Australia had scored in either the Rugby Championship or Tri Nations. During the Championship, McKenzie made several bold moves as a coach. He dropped star player Will Genia for Nic White, who at the time had only 3 caps, and named Ben Mowen as captain in his first year as a test player. In the final Bledisloe Cap match, Australia became the first team to score 33 points against New Zealand in New Zealand, but lost the match 41–33 with New Zealand winning the series 3–0.

On the 2013 end of year tour, McKenzie led the team to 4 consecutive wins (50–20 win over Italy, 32–15 win over Ireland, 21–15 win over Scotland and a 30–26 win over Wales) which was the first time Australia has done this since 2008. The 20–13 loss to England in the opening match of the tour ruled out winning the Grand Slam, but Australia won the tour and retained the Lansdowne Cup, reclaimed the Hopetoun Cup and claimed the James Bevan Trophy for the 6th time in a row.

==== Second season: 2014 ====
Australia under McKenzie built on the results from the 2013 tour, increasing the 4 consecutive wins to 7 for the first time since 2000 with a 3–0 test series win over France during the June International Window. The match results were a 50–23 win in Brisbane, a 6–0 win in Melbourne and a 39–13 win in Sydney. The series win meant Australia regained the Trophée des Bicentenaires after it had been lost in 2012.

The Wallabies's unbeaten run stretched to 8 matches with a 12–all draw with New Zealand, prompting optimism that Australia could end their 28-year losing streak at Eden Park. However, Australia came crashing back to earth, suffering a 51–20 defeat, stretching Australia's Bledisloe Cup drought to a 12 years. Australia managed to bounce back from that defeat, with hard fought 24–23 and 32–25 wins over South Africa and Argentina, with the latter win ensuring that the Wallabies retained the Puma Trophy.

Australia's 28–10 loss away in Cape Town, after conceding 3 tries and a drop goal in the final 11 minutes of the match, led to a one-all test series against South Africa which meant that Australia was unable to reclaim the Mandela Challenge Plate. A week later, Australia suffered a 21–17 loss in Argentina to become the first country to lose to the Pumas in the Rugby Championship since Argentina's admittance in 2012. The result came as a surprise to some as Australia had led 14–0 after scoring two tries in the first twelve minutes, but had but only managed to add one further penalty during the rest of the match.

The Wallabies played the All Blacks in Brisbane for third and final Bledisloe Cup match of 2014. For most of the match Australia was the better side and dominated the New Zealanders. The Wallabies had a 25–15 lead with fifteen minutes remaining, but conceded two late tries, the second being converted in over-time, for the All Blacks to win by 29–28. This was McKenzie's last match as Australia's head coach.

==== Resignation as Wallabies coach ====
McKenzie announced the end of his tenure as Australian head coach in the press conference after the final Bledisloe Cup test of 2014, explaining that he had submitted his resignation on the morning of the match against the All Blacks, effective regardless of whether the result was a win, loss or draw. It was just six days before the team left Australia for their 2014 Spring Tour.

This came after a turbulent three weeks in the Australian camp. On 29 September, the ARU had announced that Kurtley Beale would be investigated over a heated argument between Beale and the Wallabies business manager Di Patston, on a 10-hour flight from Johannesburg to São Paulo. The incident led to Patston leaving the tour early and she resigned from her position shortly afterwards under stress.

As the fall-out continued it was reported that Beale had distributed offensive texts and images referring to Patston some months earlier. Patston had not escalated this to the ARU to give Beale a second chance but had told him that she would reveal the contents of the texts if another incident arose. Beale later admitted to sending an offensive photo and was eventually fined $45,000 by an independent tribunal. – See Kurtley Beale § Di Patston text controversy.

On 10 October at the announcement of the 32-man squad for the Bledisloe Cup match, it took 17 minutes for the press to ask anything about the squad, while McKenzie came under fire over the off-field issues leading to Beale's suspension from the team and upcoming tribunal appearance, and was questioned about Patston's role and whether he had lost the confidence of the players. McKenzie was even forced to deny being in an extramarital affair with Patston.

McKenzie was appalled at the vitriolic attacks against Patston and the insinuations about his relationship with her. Team captain Michael Hooper backed Beale while Christian Lealiifano and Quade Cooper joined McKenzie in backing Patston. It was reported that some players had become uneasy with Patston's role in the team, and with how much power McKenzie had given her following the revelation that Patston had input into the player disciplinary measures that occurred on the 2013 Spring Tour.

==== Record ====
McKenzie coached the Wallabies to 11 wins and one draw in 22 tests coached, a winning percentage of 50%. He had a good winning record against European teams, 7 of 8 tests played – the lone loss was against England in November 2013 – and a good record against Argentina, a 3–1 win–loss record. However, he ended with a losing record against other Rugby Championship opponents, with only a draw to show for in six matches against New Zealand and a 1–3 win–loss record against South Africa.

== Coaching statistics ==
=== Australia ===
==== Overview ====
Opponent	Played	Won	Lost	Drew	Win ratio (%)
Argentina	4	3	1	0	75
England	1	0	1	0	0
France	3	3	0	0	100
Ireland	1	1	0	0	100
Italy	1	1	0	0	100
New Zealand	6	0	5	1	0
South Africa	4	1	3	0	25
Scotland	1	1	0	0	100
Wales	1	1	0	0	100
TOTAL	22	11	10	1	50

==== International matches as head coach ====
Note: World Rankings Column shows the World Ranking Australia was placed at on the following Monday after each of their matches

Matches (2013–2014)
Matches	Date	Opposition	Venue	Score (Aus–Opponent)	Competition	Captain	World Ranking
2013
1	17 August	New Zealand	ANZ Stadium, Sydney	29–47	Rugby Championship	James Horwill	4th
2	24 August	New Zealand	Westpac Stadium, Wellington	16–27	Rugby Championship	James Horwill	4th
3	7 September	South Africa	Suncorp Stadium, Brisbane	12–38	Rugby Championship	Will Genia	4th
4	14 September	Argentina	Subiaco Oval, Perth	14–13	Rugby Championship	Ben Mowen	4th
5	28 September	South Africa	Newlands Stadium, Cape Town	8–28	Rugby Championship	James Horwill	4th
6	5 October	Argentina	Estadio Gigante de Arroyito, Rosario	54–17	Rugby Championship	James Horwill	4th
7	19 October	New Zealand	Forsyth Barr Stadium, Dunedin	33–41	End of year tour	James Horwill	4th
8	2 November	England	Twickenham Stadium, London	13–20	End of year tour	Ben Mowen	4th
9	9 November	Italy	Stadio Olimpico di Torino, Turin	50–20	End of year tour	Ben Mowen	4th
10	16 November	Ireland	Aviva Stadium, Dublin	32–15	End of year tour	Ben Mowen	4th
11	23 November	Scotland	Murrayfield Stadium, Edinburgh	21–15	End of year tour	Ben Mowen	3rd
12	30 November	Wales	Millennium Stadium, Cardiff	30–26	End of year tour	Ben Mowen	3rd
2014
13	7 June	France	Suncorp Stadium, Brisbane	50–23	French Test Series	Stephen Moore	3rd
14	14 June	France	Etihad Stadium, Melbourne	6–0	French Test Series	Michael Hooper	3rd
15	21 June	France	Allianz Stadium, Sydney	39–13	French Test Series	Michael Hooper	3rd
16	16 August	New Zealand	ANZ Stadium, Sydney	12–12	Rugby Championship	Michael Hooper	3rd
17	23 August	New Zealand	Eden Park, Auckland	20–51	Rugby Championship	Michael Hooper	3rd
18	6 September	South Africa	Patersons Stadium, Perth	24–23	Rugby Championship	Michael Hooper	3rd
19	13 September	Argentina	Cbus Super Stadium, Gold Coast	32–25	Rugby Championship	Michael Hooper	3rd
20	27 September	South Africa	DHL Newlands, Cape Town	10–28	Rugby Championship	Michael Hooper	3rd
21	4 October	Argentina	Estadio Malvinas Argentinas, Mendoza	17–21	Rugby Championship	Michael Hooper	4th
22	18 October	New Zealand	Suncorp Stadium, Brisbane	28–29	Bledisloe three	Michael Hooper	4th

=== Honours ===
- Puma Trophy
  - Winner: 2013, 2014
- Trophée des Bicentenaires
  - Winner: June 2014
- Hopetoun Cup
  - Winner: 2013
- Lansdowne Cup
  - Winner: 2013
- James Bevan Trophy
  - Winner: 2013

=== Club honours ===
- Super Rugby
  - Winner: 2011 (Queensland Reds)
  - Runner-up: 2005, 2008 (Waratahs) – 2000 (Brumbies)
- Super Rugby Australian Conference
  - Winner: 2011, 2012 (Queensland Reds)
- Australian Conference – Coach of the year
  - Winner: 2011, 2012

=== Other honours ===
The following achievements were picked up by McKenzie during his time as assistant coach for the Wallabies between 2000 and 2003.

- Rugby World Cup / Webb Ellis Cup
  - Runner-up: 2003
- Tom Richards Cup
  - Winner: 2001
- Tri Nations
  - Winner: 2000, 2001
  - Runner-up: 2003
- Bledisloe Cup
  - Winner: 2000, 2001

Preceded by (New Zealand) Robbie Deans	Australian national rugby union coach 2013–2014	Succeeded by (Australia) Michael Cheika
