= Matt To'omua =

Australia international rugby union player

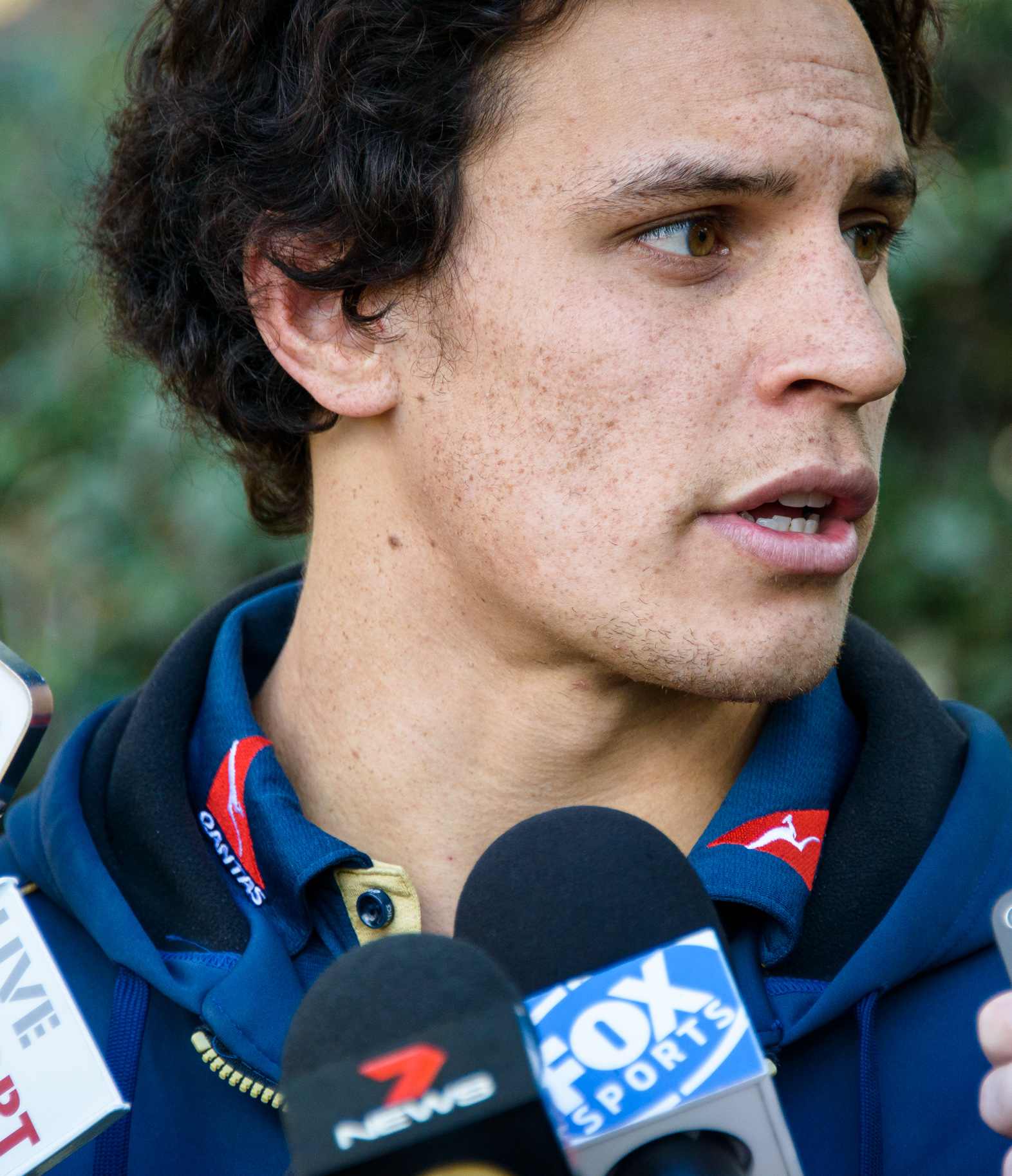
- To'omua in 2014
- Born: Matthew Papali'i To'omua; 2 January 1990 (age 36) Melbourne, Victoria, Australia
- Height: 182 cm (6 ft 0 in)
- Weight: 91 kg (14 st 5 lb)
- School: Brisbane State High School

Rugby union career
- Position(s): Fly-half, centre
Amateur team(s)
Years	Team	Apps	(Points)
2008–2011	Eastern Suburbs	31	(88)
2015	NSW Country Eagles		
Senior career
Years	Team	Apps	(Points)
2008–2016	Brumbies	89	(102)
2009	Western Province	4	(0)
2016–2019	Leicester Tigers	41	(73)
2019–2022	Melbourne Rebels	42	(325)
2022–2024	Mitsubishi DynaBoars	14	(89)
- Correct as of 31 March 2025
International career
Years	Team	Apps	(Points)
2009–2010	Australia U20	10	(74)
2013–2021	Australia	59	(85)
- Correct as of 19 May 2022

Matthew Papali'i To'omua /ˈtuːmuːə/ (born 2 January 1990) is an Australian former professional rugby union player who played 59 Tests for Australia. He last played for the Mitsubishi Dynaboars in the Japanese League One and his usual position is at fly-half or inside centre. He has previously played for the Brumbies in Australia, for Leicester Tigers in England's Premiership Rugby and for Melbourne Rebels in Super Rugby.

== Early life ==
To'omua was born in Melbourne, Victoria to a Samoan father and a New Zealand mother of European origin. To'omua moved to Brisbane where he played his junior football with Logan City and Logan Brothers before attending Brisbane State High School. In 2006 he guided the Queensland II side to their maiden Australian National Schools Championship title, scoring all of his side's points in their 14–13 final win over NSW II in Sydney. Competing against the likes of older flyhalves Kurtley Beale (NSW) and Queensland's Quade Cooper, To'omua was selected in the Australia A side that defeated the Tongan Under 18s, 22–18. Two months later, he captained Queensland Red to the finals of the National Under 16 Championship in Sydney.

== Career ==
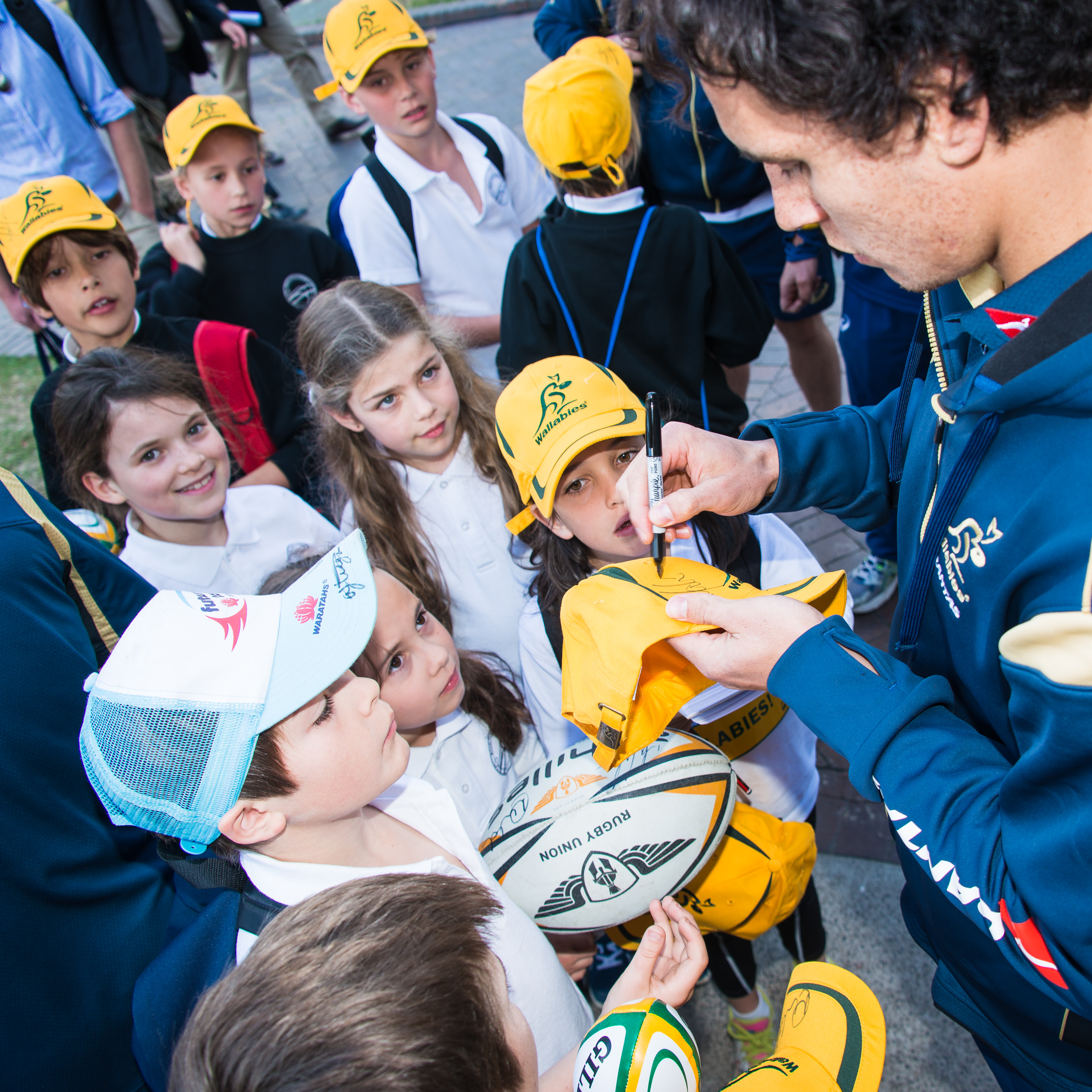
Wallaby Matt To'omua and fans in 2014

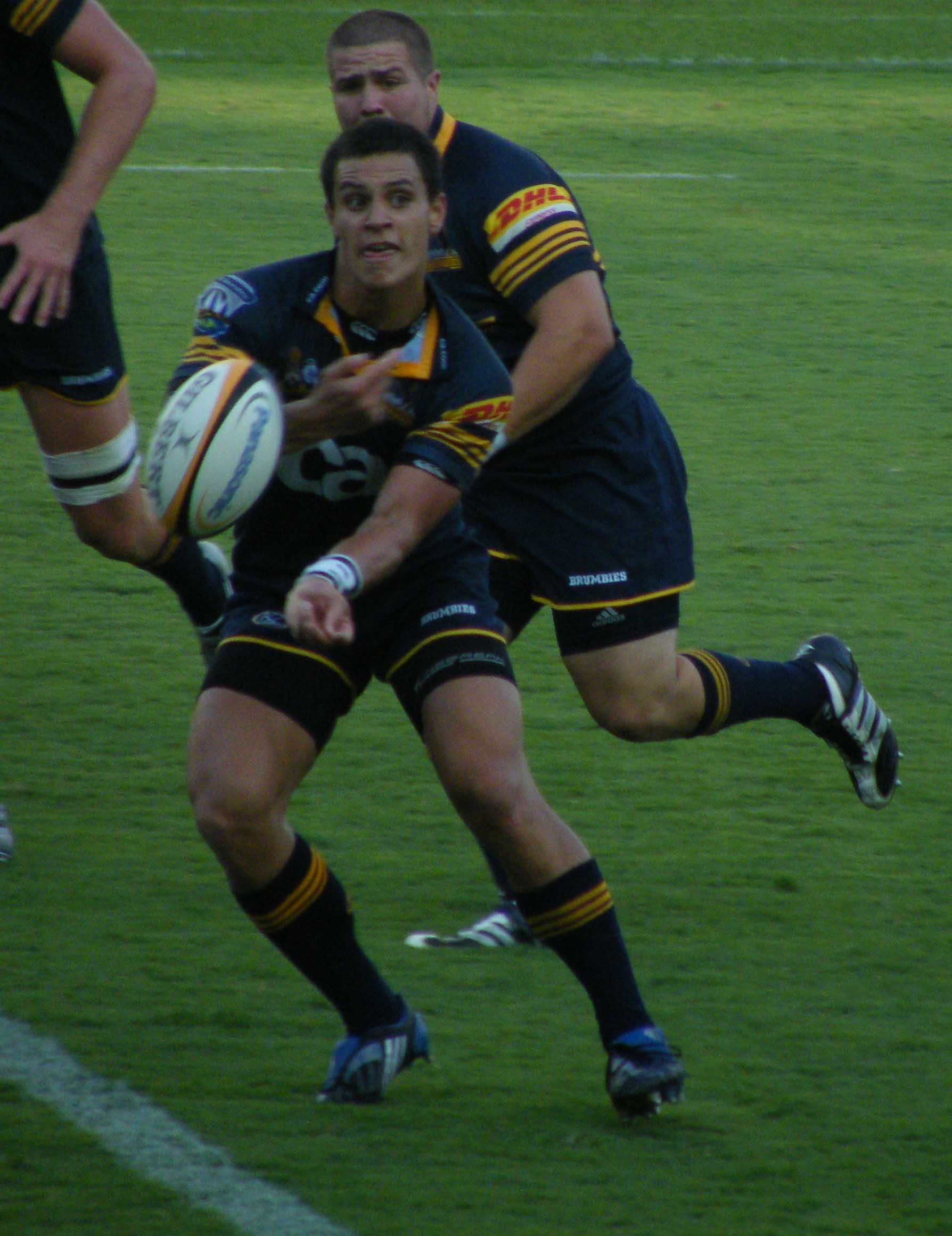
To'omua in 2009

To'omua is a fly-half who headed to Canberra as a potential long-term playmaker prospect for the two-time Super Rugby champions. To'omua is a product of Brisbane State High School.

In July 2007 To'omua won his second Australian Schools Championship, guiding Queensland I to a come-from-behind 23–17 win over NSW I in Canberra. His performance during the tournament earned him the pivot's role for the Australian Schoolboys where he helped guide the side to wins over the England Under 18s (11–3), Samoan Schools (50–9) and a 23–17 win over New Zealand Schools in Sydney, the side's first win over their trans-Tasman rivals since 1997.

From 2008-2011 To'omua represented Eastern Suburbs. Playing 31 games, scoring 10 tries and 88 points in the Shute shield.

In 2013, the Brumbies selected To'omua at fly half. In the Brumbies first game of the 2013 Super Rugby season, Lealiifano moved to inside centre; and both To'omua and Lealiifano played the full 80 minutes to help the Brumbies defeat the Reds. During the semi-final clash against the South African team the Bulls at Loftus Versfeld in Pretoria, To'omua help set-up the match-winning try to outside-centre Tevita Kuridrani in the final minutes of the game, helping the Brumbies to win 26–23 which had also guided the team to the Grand Final match against the Chiefs.

After an outstanding Super Rugby season with the Brumbies in 2013, To'omua was selected in the Wallabies 2013 Rugby Championship Squad. On 18 August, he made his Test debut for the Wallabies at Sydney's ANZ Stadium facing the current World Champion All Blacks in the 1st Bledisloe Cup Test (of 2013). He became the first Wallaby debutant player to make his Test debut against the All Blacks in the Wallabies starting XV since Rod Kafer. He was on the field for 60 minutes before being substituted by Quade Cooper.

Following the Sydney Bledisloe Cup game loss, Ewen McKenzie stuck with him at fly-half for the second Bledisloe Cup Test at Westpac Stadium in the New Zealand national capital, Wellington. However, the Wallabies ended-up losing 16–27, and the All Blacks won the Bledisloe Cup (for 2013). The following that game To'omua was benched for the rest of the 2013 Rugby Championship and Quade Cooper claimed the No. 10 fly-half jersey.

On 19 October, To'omua was selected at inside centre for the third Bledisloe Cup clash at Forsyth Barr Stadium in Dunedin. He scored a try at Test level in the game's second half. The Wallabies lost 33–41.

On the Wallabies European spring tour, coach Ewen McKenzie selected him at inside centre for the clashes against England (where he scored the only try for the Wallabies in that game), Italy and Ireland. In the lead-up to the clash against Scotland, To'omua injured his hamstring at training which ruled him out of the rest of the Wallabies final two Spring Tour games.

On 15 November 2015 Leicester Tigers announced the signing of To'omua from the summer of 2016. He made his debut for Leicester on 14 October 2016 in a 42–13 defeat to Glasgow Warriors, To'omua was sent to the sin bin after 13 minutes for a spear tackle. To'omua then suffered a serious knee injury in the next game, his first game at Welford Road, which ruled him out for six months.

In August 2018, it was announced that To'omua would return to his hometown to join the Melbourne Rebels after the 2018–19 Premiership Rugby season. Following a disappointing season where Leicester had to fight relegation To'ouma was released early on 13 May 2019 to join the Rebels with immediate effect.

== Personal life ==
To'omua married international cricket and soccer star Ellyse Perry in December 2015. In July 2020, they announced they had separated earlier that year.

== Career statistics ==
As of 30 May 2022

Season	Team	Games	Starts	Sub	Mins	Tries	Cons	Pens	Drops	Points	Yel	Red
2008	Brumbies	3	0	3	18	0	0	0	0	0	0	0
2009	Brumbies	9	4	5	323	0	1	0	1	5	0	0
2010	Brumbies	7	5	2	415	3	0	0	0	15	0	0
2011	Brumbies	6	4	2	321	0	0	0	0	0	0	0
2012	Brumbies	3	3	0	210	0	0	0	0	0	0	0
2013	Brumbies	18	18	0	1402	2	1	0	0	12	0	0
2014	Brumbies	17	17	0	1284	7	2	0	0	39	2	0
2015	Brumbies	12	11	1	815	2	0	0	0	10	0	0
2016	Brumbies	13	13	0	989	3	3	0	0	21	2	0
2019	Rebels	5	2	3	173	0	0	0	0	0	0	0
2020	Rebels	5	5	0	349	0	9	6	0	36	0	0
2020 AU	Rebels	9	9	0	660	1	17	19	0	96	0	0
2021 AU	Rebels	8	8	0	597	1	8	27	0	102	0	0
2021 TT	Rebels	4	4	0	319	0	5	1	0	13	0	0
2022	Rebels	11	11	0	760	0	18	14	0	78	0	0
Super Rugby		130	114	16	8,635	19	64	67	1	427	4	0
2016–17	Leicester	0	0	0	0	0	0	0	0	0	0	0
2017–18	Leicester	17	17	0	1280	4	10	6	0	58	0	0
2018–19	Leicester	12	10	2	753	0	2	2	0	10	1	0
English Premiership		29	27	2	2,033	4	12	8	0	68	1	0
Total		159	141	18	10,668	23	76	75	1	495	5	0
