= Peter Lalor Vocational College =

Coordinates: 37°45′21″S 145°02′21.1″E

Peter Lalor Vocational College is a public, co-educational high school located in Lalor, Victoria, Australia. It was created in 2012 from Peter Lalor Secondary College.

== See also ==
- Peter Lalor
