= Ben Mowen =

Australia international rugby union player

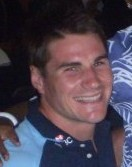
- Born: 1 December 1984 (age 41) Brisbane, Australia
- Height: 195 cm (6 ft 5 in)
- Weight: 110 kg (17 st 5 lb; 243 lb)
- School: Villanova College

Rugby union career
- Position: Flanker / Number 8
Amateur team(s)
Years	Team	Apps	(Points)
2003–06, 2020	Easts Tigers		
Senior career
Years	Team	Apps	(Points)
2014–16	Montpellier	35	(15)
2016–19	Pau	58	(30)
- Correct as of 19 January 2019
Super Rugby
Years	Team	Apps	(Points)
2006	Reds	6	(0)
2008–11	Waratahs	40	(15)
2012–14	Brumbies	50	(30)
- Correct as of 27 JULY 2014
International career
Years	Team	Apps	(Points)
2013	Australia	15	(5)
2005	Australia U-21		
- Correct as of 1 December 2013

Ben Mowen (born 1 December 1984) is an Australian former professional rugby union player. He was the captain of the Australia national team and also the ACT Brumbies team in Super Rugby. He played at blindside flanker or number-eight.

== Early life ==
Mowen was born in Brisbane and educated at Villanova College. He played for the Brisbane Easts club, and captained the Queensland under 19s. At the 2005 Under 21 Rugby World Championship he captained Australia to finish second.

== Rugby career ==
Mowen made his Super Rugby debut in 2006 Super 14 season for the Queensland Reds against the Sharks. He made only other six appearances for Reds during the season, all being in non-competition matches, so he moved to the Waratahs in 2007, joining Randwick in the Shute Shield competition.

Late in the 2011 Super Rugby season Mowen was forced to leave the Waratahs to allow for Rocky Elsom's return from the Brumbies. In July 2011 Mowen signed a two-year contract to play under Jake White at the Brumbies, being made captain for the 2012 season. In June 2013, former Wallaby, Stephen Larkham stated that, after some doubts, Mowen had turned out to be one of the best leaders he has ever encountered.

Mowen made his Wallaby debut on 22 June 2013, against the British and Irish Lions in the position of blindside flanker. He maintained his spot in the team for the entire series. On 31 October 2013, he replaced James Horwill as captain of the Wallabies.

Mowen left Australia at the end of the 2014 Super Rugby season. He has said of his departure from test rugby: "I am probably the first (Wallabies captain to be in this situation), but I'm also probably the first bloke to make his Test debut at 28 and retire at 29."

Preceded by David Pocock	Australian national rugby union captain 2013	Succeeded by Stephen Moore
