= Tevita Kuridrani =

Australian rugby union player

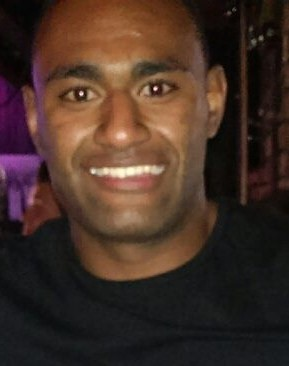
- Born: Ratu Tevita Kuridrani; 31 March 1991 (age 35) Suva, Fiji
- Height: 192 cm (6 ft 4 in)
- Weight: 102 kg (16 st 1 lb; 225 lb)
- School: Corinda State High School; Lelean Memorial School

Rugby union career
- Position(s): Outside-Centre, Wing
Senior career
| Years | Team | Apps | (Points) |
| 2014 | Greater Sydney Rams | 0 | (0) |
| 2021–pres. | Biarritz | 22 | (10) |
- Correct as of 23 September 2022
Super Rugby
| Years | Team | Apps | (Points) |
| 2012–20 | Brumbies | 135 | (140) |
| 2021 | Force | 11 | (5) |
- Correct as of 12 June 2021
International career
| Years | Team | Apps | (Points) |
| 2010 | Fiji U20 | 4 | (0) |
| 2011 | Australia U20 | 1 | (0) |
| 2013– | Australia | 61 | (100) |
- Correct as of 19 September 2019
National sevens team
| Years | Team | | Comps |
| 2010–11 | Australia 7s | | |

Tevita Kuridrani (born 31 March 1991) is a Fijian-born Australian rugby union player. His usual position is outside-centre. He is currently with French club Biarritz and previously played for the Brumbies and Western Force in Super Rugby. Kuridrani won 61 Test caps for Australia in international rugby.

== Family and early life ==
Ratu Tevita Kuridrani was born in Suva, Fiji to Inosi and Litiana Kuridrani, and grew up in the small Fijian village of Namatakula. He began playing rugby while a student at Vatuwaqa Primary School, and was part of the Suva Milo Kaji team playing in the under-12 and 13 grades. He attended Lelean Memorial School in Suva, before moving with his family to Australia in 2007.

Kuridrani attended Corinda State High School, and played rugby league and rugby union in Brisbane. Kuridrani is related to several well-known representative rugby players. He is the nephew of Noa Nadruku, and the cousin of Lote Tuqiri, Samu Wara, Nemani Nadolo, and Chris Kuridrani.

== Rugby career ==
After playing Premier Colts rugby in 2009 for University of Queensland Rugby Club, Kuridrani was chosen for the Brisbane Under-19 team at the end of that year. In 2010, he was selected for the Fiji Under-20 team and played at outside centre in the 2010 IRB Junior World Championship in Argentina. He was a member of University's Premier Rugby team that won the Hospital Cup in 2010, and was chosen for the Brisbane Under-19 team once again.

Kuridrani was selected for the Australia 7s team and played in the 2010–11 IRB Sevens World Series. He joined the Queensland Reds Academy for 2011. Kuridrani played on the wing for the Australia under 20 team at the 2011 IRB Junior World Championship in Italy, before being signed by Jake White to join the Brumbies prior to the 2012 Super Rugby season on a two-year deal.

In 2012, he made his Super Rugby debut for the Brumbies against the Reds off the bench in Brisbane. In his second season at the Brumbies, Kuridrani established himself as the team's first-choice centre, and he was a member of the starting side for the Brumbies which defeated the British and Irish Lions in 2013.

After the Brumbies had played in the Super Rugby final in 2013, Kuridrani was selected for the Wallabies squad by coach Ewen McKenzie. He made his test debut for Australia against New Zealand in Sydney on 17 August 2013. Later that year, Kuridrani was sent-off for a tip-tackle while playing for Australia against Ireland and was suspended from playing for five weeks.

His high work rate has seen him consistently be selected for the Wallabies and he has also won many "Man of the Match" awards.

== Super Rugby statistics ==
As of 22 July 2016

| Season | Team | Games | Starts | Sub | Mins | Tries | Cons | Pens | Drops | Points | Yel | Red |
|---|---|---|---|---|---|---|---|---|---|---|---|---|
| 2012 | Brumbies | 8 | 1 | 7 | 163 | 0 | 0 | 0 | 0 | 0 | 0 | 0 |
| 2013 | Brumbies | 17 | 15 | 2 | 1222 | 3 | 0 | 0 | 0 | 15 | 1 | 0 |
| 2014 | Brumbies | 17 | 16 | 1 | 1239 | 5 | 0 | 0 | 0 | 25 | 0 | 0 |
| 2015 | Brumbies | 15 | 15 | 0 | 1158 | 3 | 0 | 0 | 0 | 15 | 0 | 0 |
| 2016 | Brumbies | 16 | 16 | 0 | 1254 | 2 | 0 | 0 | 0 | 10 | 0 | 0 |
| Total | | 73 | 63 | 10 | 5036 | 13 | 0 | 0 | 0 | 65 | 1 | 0 |
