= Stephen Moore (rugby union) =

Australian rugby union player

Stephen Moore AM
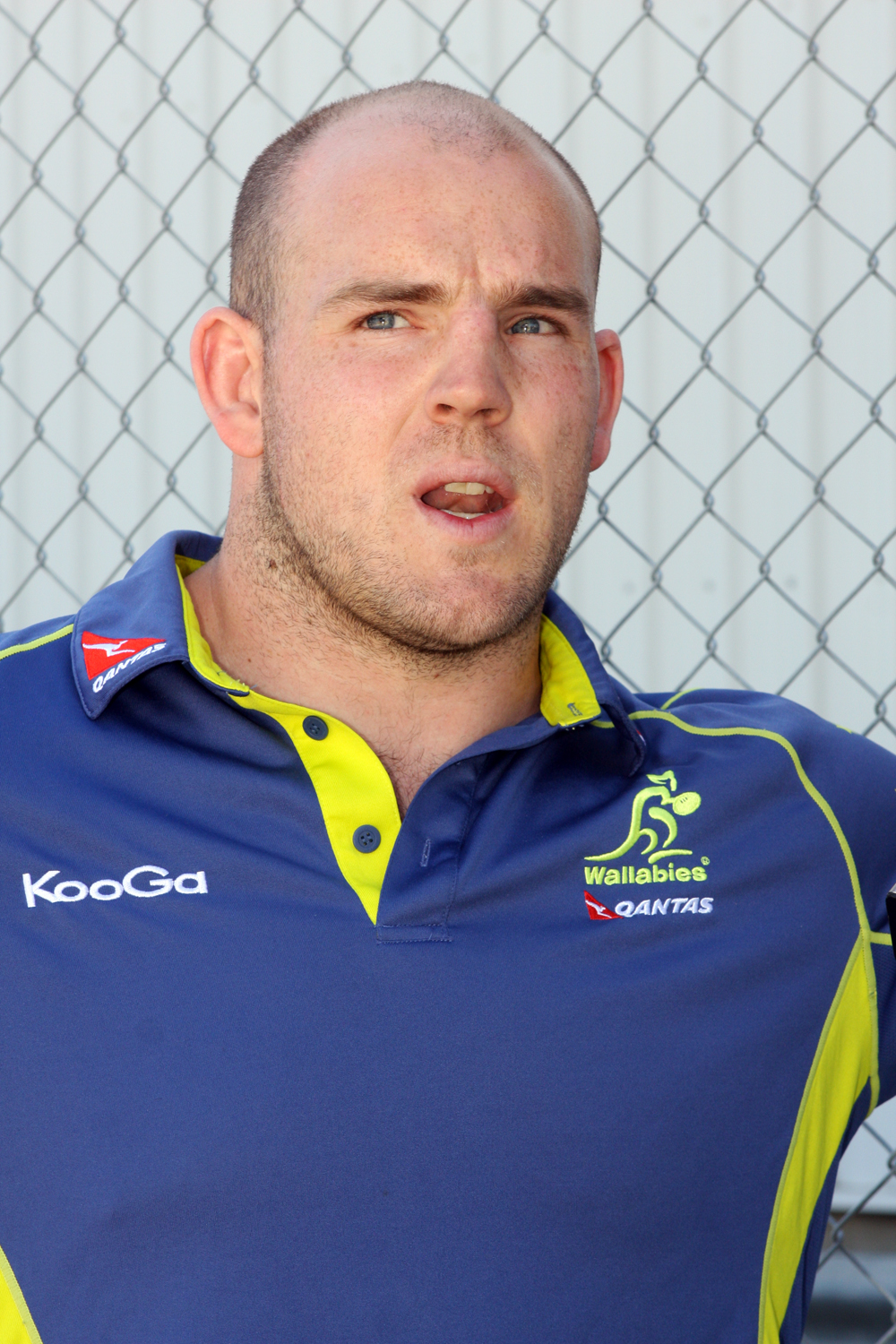
- Moore in 2012
- Born: Stephen Thomas Moore; 20 January 1983 (age 43) Khamis Mushait, Saudi Arabia
- Height: 186 cm (6 ft 1 in)
- Weight: 112 kg (247 lb; 17 st 9 lb)
- School: Brisbane Grammar School
- University: University of Queensland

Rugby union career
- Position: Hooker
- Current team: Queensland University
Senior career
Years	Team	Apps	(Points)
2016–2017	Queensland Country	0	(0)
Super Rugby
Years	Team	Apps	(Points)
2003–2008	Reds	46	(10)
2009–2016	Brumbies	117	(80)
2017	Reds	13	(20)
- Correct as of 22 November 2017
International career
Years	Team	Apps	(Points)
2005–2017	Australia	129	(40)
- Correct as of 22 November 2017
Medal record
Men's rugby union
Representing Australia
Rugby World Cup
Silver medal – second place	2015 England	Squad
Bronze medal – third place	2011 New Zealand	Squad

Stephen Thomas Moore AM (born 20 January 1983) is an Australian former rugby union footballer, who played Super Rugby for the Brumbies and Queensland Reds and earned 129 caps for Australia internationally, including 24 tests as captain.

Moore is the 14th most capped player of all time, has the third most Test appearances for Australia behind George Gregan and James Slipper and is the only Australian hooker to have played 100 Tests. He is also the second most capped Australian Super Rugby player of all time, and is one of only four players in Australian Rugby history, along with Nathan Sharpe, Michael Hooper and James Slipper to have achieved 100 Test and 150 Super Rugby appearances.

== Early years ==
Born in Saudi Arabia to Irish parents, his father Tommy came from Tuam, County Galway and his mother Maureen came from Killasser near Swinford, County Mayo. He and his family moved to Tuam, in the mid-eighties before they emigrated to Mount Morgan, Queensland, Australia in 1988, when he was five years old. His family later moved to Rockhampton, before finally settling in Brisbane.

== Career ==
Moore came up through the junior ranks in Queensland, playing schools rugby with Rockhampton Pioneers and Brisbane Grammar School prior to joining the University of Queensland Rugby Club from where he represented the Australian Under 19s. He made his Super 12 debut in 2003 for the Queensland Reds against the Bulls. He then went on to play for the under-21 Australian team at the 2003 and 2004 under-21 world championships, as well as with Australia A.

He was included in the 2005 Wallabies squad for the mid-year Tests. He debuted with Rocky Elsom against Samoa. He came off the bench in matches against Samoa, Italy and France. He was then capped three times against South Africa. In November he joined the Wallabies in France when fellow hooker Adam Freier sustained an injury. He played in the loss against France on 5 November. After the whirlwind of 2005 where Moore made his debut for the Wallabies and featured in every Queensland Reds Super 12 game, 2006 was a mixed bag which saw him finish the season on the reserves bench. However, his skills and strength as a ball runner brought an extra dimension to the Reds forwards and earned him selection on the Wallabies end of year tour to Europe. In November 2006, Moore travelled to Europe for the Autumn Internationals series. He was used as a replacement in the Australia v Italy game (25–18) in the Stadio Flaminio, Rome. He then played for the Australia A squad that defeated Ireland A mid-week in Thomond Park, Limerick. He then came on as a replacement in the 54th minute of the Ireland vs Australia game, in which Ireland ran out easy winners 21–6, in appalling conditions at Lansdowne Road stadium, Dublin. He made his first full International appearance for Australia the following weekend against Scotland at Murrayfield Stadium in Edinburgh, touching down a pass from Matt Giteau to score his first International try. Australia were easy victors with a scoreline of Australia 44 – Scotland 15.

In 2010, Moore appeared in all 13 matches for the Brumbies until breaking his jaw in the final round of regular season.

Since the 2011 Tri Nations Series, Moore has been named in every squad, usually as first choice hooker. He was a key player in Australia's 2011 winning Tri Nations Series, and 2011 Rugby World Cup campaign, in which Australia finished third. Since Australia's first match against France in the 2012 end-of-year rugby union tests, Moore had played every single match for the Wallabies, including starting every test in 2013 British & Irish Lions tour to Australia. When Robbie Deans resigned following the Lions series and when Ewen McKenzie took over the reins, Moore started at Hooker for the Wallabies for the remainder of the 2013 Test schedule playing very well.

In McKenzie's second year in charge, McKenzie named Stephen Moore as captain for the 2014 three-test June series against France, with Michael Hooper and Adam Ashley-Cooper as vice captains. However, in his first Test as Wallabies captain, Moore picked up a season-ending ACL knee injury as he went down awkwardly when making a tackle in the second minute and he left the field in the 5th minutes of the game in the Wallabies' 50–23 win over France at Brisbane's Suncorp Stadium.

On 6 July 2015, Moore was named as Wallabies' captain for the upcoming World Cup under new coach Michael Cheika. Moore subsequently lead the Wallabies to the final against New Zealand, with the final score 34–17 to New Zealand, the highest overall combined score in a Rugby World Cup final.

Moore broke the record for most Super Rugby tries in a single season scored by a hooker in 2016, crossing the line seven times for the Brumbies that season, including a double in the 43–24 win against his former team the Reds. Moore also announced in late 2015 that he would return to the Reds following the 2016 season.

In 2017 Moore announced that he would retire from international rugby at the end of the year and retire from Super Rugby at the end of 2018. Moore's captaincy was immediately given to Michael Hooper. He last played for Australia on 25 November 2017, in a record 53–24 defeat to Scotland. This match would turn out to be his last match of professional rugby.

Moore was made a Member of the Order of Australia (AM) in the 2019 Queen's Birthday Honours in recognition of his "significant service to rugby union, and to charitable organisations".

== Personal life ==
Moore is married to Courtney, and has three children, Theodore, Darcy, and Lawrence.

== Super Rugby statistics ==
As of 22 July 2016

Season	Team	Games	Starts	Sub	Mins	Tries	Cons	Pens	Drops	Points	Yel	Red
2003	Reds	1	0	1	5	0	0	0	0	0	0	0
2004	Reds	1	0	1	1	0	0	0	0	0	0	0
2005	Reds	10	7	3	520	0	0	0	0	0	0	0
2006	Reds	11	5	6	481	2	0	0	0	10	0	0
2007	Reds	10	6	4	595	0	0	0	0	0	0	0
2008	Reds	13	10	3	700	0	0	0	0	0	0	0
2009	Brumbies	12	12	0	793	0	0	0	0	0	0	0
2010	Brumbies	13	13	0	739	2	0	0	0	10	0	0
2011	Brumbies	12	12	0	846	4	0	0	0	20	0	0
2012	Brumbies	16	16	0	1205	0	0	0	0	0	0	0
2013	Brumbies	18	17	1	1311	0	0	0	0	0	1	0
2014	Brumbies	13	13	0	951	2	0	0	0	10	0	0
2015	Brumbies	18	16	2	1072	1	0	0	0	5	0	0
2016	Brumbies	15	15	0	863	7	0	0	0	35	0	0
2017	Reds	13	12	1	798	4	0	0	0	25	0	0
Total		176	154	22	10880	22	0	0	0	115	1	0

Preceded by Ben Mowen	Australian national rugby union captain 2014	Succeeded by Michael Hooper
