= Christian Leali'ifano =

Australia & Samoa international rugby union player

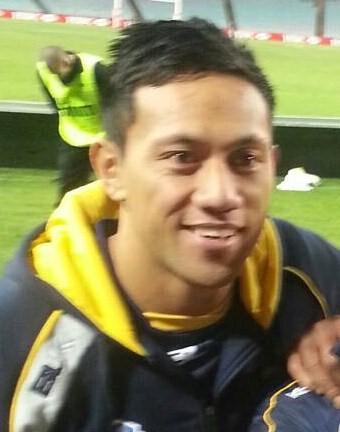
- Leali'ifano representing ACT Brumbies during Super Rugby
- Full name: Christian Pharaoh Leali'ifano
- Born: 24 September 1987 (age 39) Auckland, New Zealand
- Height: 1.81 m (5 ft 11 in)
- Weight: 92 kg (203 lb; 14 st 7 lb)
- School: Peter Lalor Secondary College

Rugby union career
- Position(s): Fly-half, Centre
Senior career
Years	Team	Apps	(Points)
2007	Canberra Vikings	6	(10)
2008–2019	ACT Brumbies	150	(963)
2010	Waikato	11	(5)
2014–2015	Canberra Vikings	10	(90)
2016–2017	→ Ulster (loan)	17	(47)
2018–2019 2025–2026	Toyota Shuttles	13	(5)
2020–2021	NTT Shining Arcs	6	(41)
2022–2023	Moana Pasifika	29	(146)
2024	Auckland	2	(13)
2025	RFCLA	13	(99)
- Correct as of 18 July 2025
International career
Years	Team	Apps	(Points)
2006	Australia U19	5	(10)
2006	Australia U21	4	(3)
2013–2019	Australia	26	(171)
2023–	Samoa	9	(49)
- Correct as of 18 May 2024

Christian Pharaoh Leali'ifano (born 24 September 1987) is a professional rugby union player who most recently played for Japanese team Toyota Shuttles in Japan Rugby League One, Division Two. Born in New Zealand, he represents Samoa at international level after qualifying on ancestry grounds, having previously played over twenty-five times for Australia between 2013 and 2019.

== Early life ==
Leali'ifano was born in Auckland, New Zealand, and moved with his family to Melbourne, Australia when he was seven years old. He attended Epping Primary School and Peter Lalor Secondary College. He played rugby union for the Australian Schoolboys team in 2004 and 2005.

Leali'ifano joined the Brumbies rugby academy program in 2006. Later that year he was selected for the Australian Under 19 and Under 21 rugby teams. He played fly-half for the Australian Under 19 rugby team that won the IRB World Championship in 2006.

== Club career ==
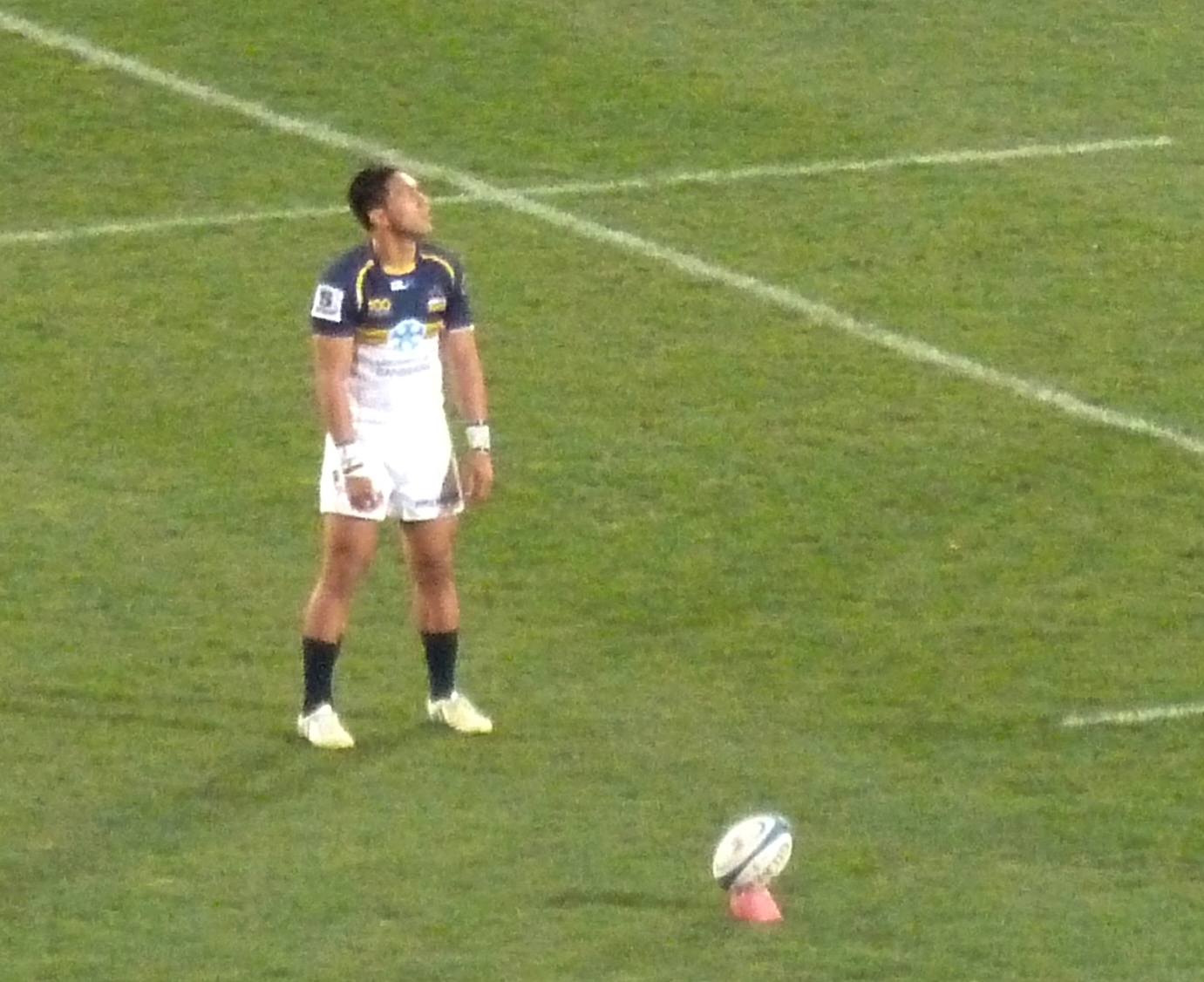
Lealiifano in 2013

In 2007, Leali'ifano signed with the Brumbies on a rookie contract. He played for the Australian Sevens rugby team, and for the Canberra Vikings in the Australian Rugby Championship in 2007.

Leali'ifano made his Super Rugby debut in 2008 against the Crusaders in Christchurch. He played fly-half in 2008 and 2009, before shifting to inside centre when Matt Giteau returned to the Brumbies in 2010. Leali'ifano played six Super 14 games for the Brumbies in 2010 before being sidelined with a knee injury (rupture to his posterior cruciate). He recovered by July to play in the ITM Cup for Waikato in 2010, and he played fourteen matches for the Brumbies in 2011.

In 2012, Leali'ifano was named Man of the Match by Super Rugby officials for eight out of the ten Super Rugby games he played. Unfortunately, he suffered a broken ankle in his tenth game which ended his season and any chance of being selected for the Wallabies in 2012.

In August 2017, after successful treatment for leukaemia, Leali'ifano signed for Irish Pro14 and European Rugby Champions Cup side Ulster on a 5-month loan deal.

For the 2022 Super Rugby Pacific season he has signed with the Moana Pasifika franchise.

On 7 May 2022 in a game against the Waratahs, Leali'ifano became the 7th player to reach 1,000 Super Rugby points.

== International career ==
Leali'ifano's test debut for the Wallabies lasted less than one minute. On 22 June 2013, he was knocked out attempting to tackle the British and Irish Lions centre Jonathan Davies in Brisbane.

In August 2019, Leali'ifano was named in the Wallabies squad for the 2019 Rugby World Cup in Japan. He played in four matches, including the quarter-final loss against England.

In June 2023, Leali'ifano was named in a 40-man Manu Samoa squad in preparation for the World Cup, after eligibility rules set by World Rugby allowed players to switch allegiance.

In August 2023, Leali'ifano was named in the 32-man Manu Samoa squad for the 2023 Rugby World Cup in France.

== Personal life ==
In August 2016, two weeks after the Brumbies were knocked out of the Super Rugby finals, Leali'ifano was diagnosed with leukaemia. He has resumed playing after receiving a bone marrow transplant, and in 2017 signed for Ulster, who play in the Pro14, on loan. He has signed with the Moana Pasifika for the 2022 Super Rugby Pacific season.

== Career statistics ==
=== Club summary ===
As of 22 July 2016

Season	Team	Games	Starts	Sub	Mins	Tries	Cons	Pens	Drops	Points	Yel	Red
2008	Brumbies	13	13	0	1040	2	0	0	0	10	1	0
2009	Brumbies	9	9	0	712	4	0	0	2	26	0	0
2010	Brumbies	6	6	0	466	1	0	0	0	5	0	0
2011	Brumbies	14	12	2	937	2	0	1	0	13	1	0
2012	Brumbies	10	10	0	788	0	17	25	0	109	0	0
2013	Brumbies	18	18	0	1393	4	22	58	0	238	0	0
2014	Brumbies	13	10	3	904	0	12	15	0	69	0	0
2015	Brumbies	18	18	0	1419	4	33	28	0	170	0	0
2016	Brumbies	16	16	0	1267	3	41	22	0	163	0	0
2022	Moana Pasifika	8	7	1	541	0	11	7	0	43	1	0
Total		117	112	5	8926	20	125	149	2	803	3	0
