= Nic White =

Australian rugby union player

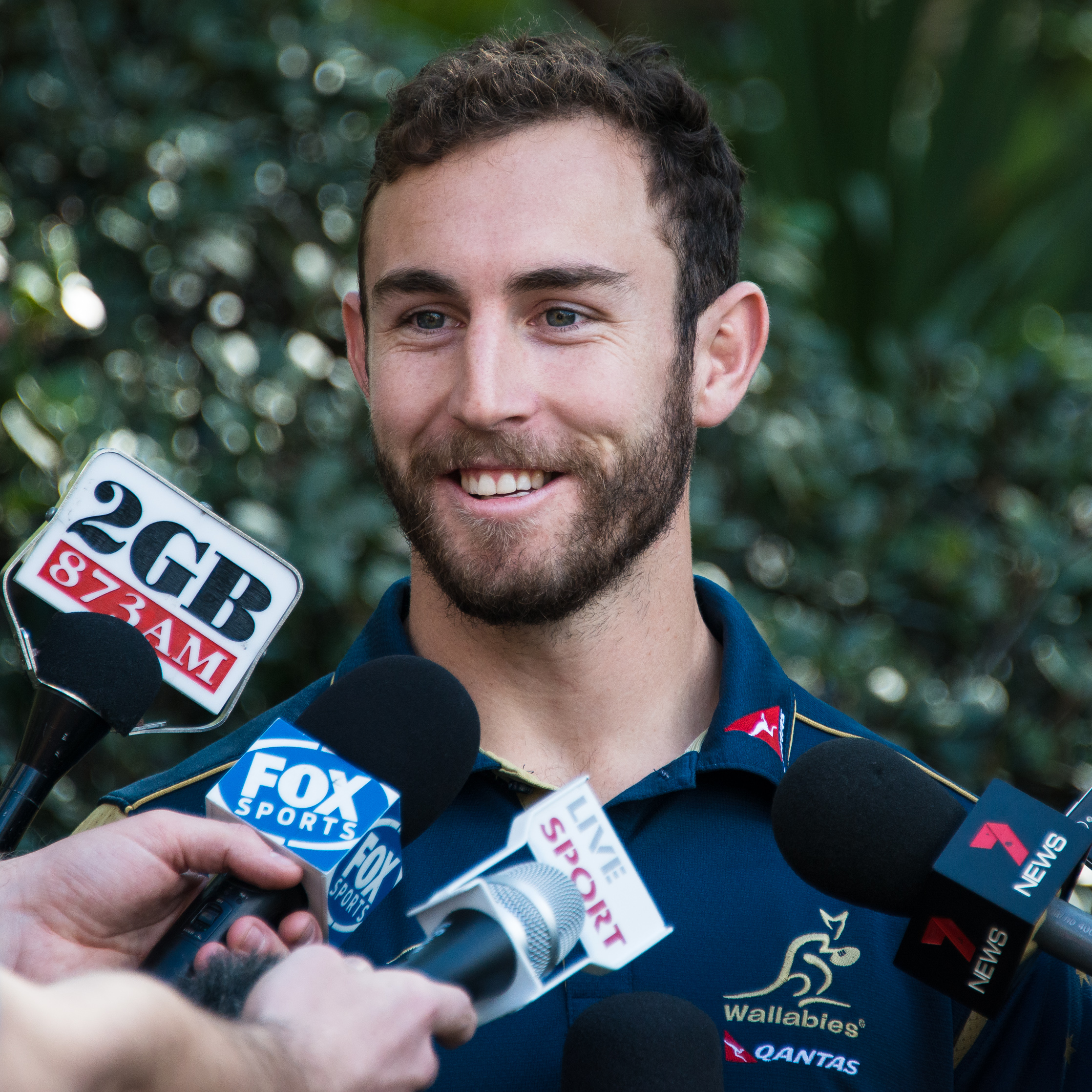
- White representing Australia facing media, October 2014
- Full name: Nicolas William White
- Born: 13 June 1990 (age 36) Scone, New South Wales, Australia
- Height: 1.75 m (5 ft 9 in)
- Weight: 80 kg (176 lb; 12 st 8 lb)
- School: St. Gregory's College

Rugby union career
- Position: Scrum-half
Senior career
Years	Team	Apps	(Points)
2011–2015	ACT Brumbies	67	(162)
2014	NSW Country Eagles	1	(0)
2015–2017	Montpellier	57	(33)
2017–2020	Exeter Chiefs	61	(70)
2020–2023	ACT Brumbies	55	(44)
2024–2025	Western Force	23	(10)
- Correct as of 24 May 2025
International career
Years	Team	Apps	(Points)
2009–2010	Australia U20	8	(33)
2013–2025	Australia	77	(51)
- Correct as of 22 October 2025

Nicolas William White (born 13 June 1990) is an Australian former professional rugby union player who played as a scrum-half for Super Rugby club Western Force and the Australia national team.

== Early life ==
White attended St Gregory's College, Campbelltown representing New South Wales Combined Catholic Colleges. He played for NSW Schools 2nd XV at the Australian Schoolboys Championship in 2007 while in year 11. In 2008 he injured his medial collateral ligament and missed the schoolboy representative season.

== Club career ==
White played in the John I Dent Cup grand final in 2010, kicking a last minute penalty for Queanbeyan to win 30-28 to deny Vikings a fourth grand final victory in a row. In 2011 he joined the Eastwood club in Sydney, playing halfback in their near perfect season, in which they lost only one competition game on the way to defeating Sydney University in the grand final. Nic achieved the rare feat of a hat trick of tries in a finals match in the previous week's final against Randwick, completing his feat in the first 10 minutes of the game.

White made his Brumbies debut during the 2011 Super Rugby season against the Reds in Brisbane. He started 2012 as the starting halfback for the Brumbies as they just failed by a point to make the finals after a poor 2011 season. In 2013 at the age of 23 he was named as the twelfth player to captain the Brumbies when they played the Melbourne Rebels in a Super Rugby game. The Brumbies made the Super Rugby final in 2013 but after an arduous travel schedule, which included beating the Bulls in Pretoria, they faded in the closing stages to lose to the Chiefs in Hamilton. In 2014 they again made the semi-finals, losing to the Waratahs in Sydney and in 2015 lost in the semi-finals to the Hurricanes in Wellington.

White, alongside teammate David Pocock, was named vice-captain of the Brumbies for the 2015 Super Rugby season on 15 January 2015. Nonetheless, he would later that year commit to joining French Top 14 side Montpellier Hérault by signing a contract.

On 16 March 2017, White finalised his move to Exeter Chiefs in the English Premiership starting from the 2017-18 season. He later came back to Australia in October 2019 to reunite with the ACT Brumbies. In May 2023, it was revealed that White would embark on a two-year contract with the Western Force.

== International career ==
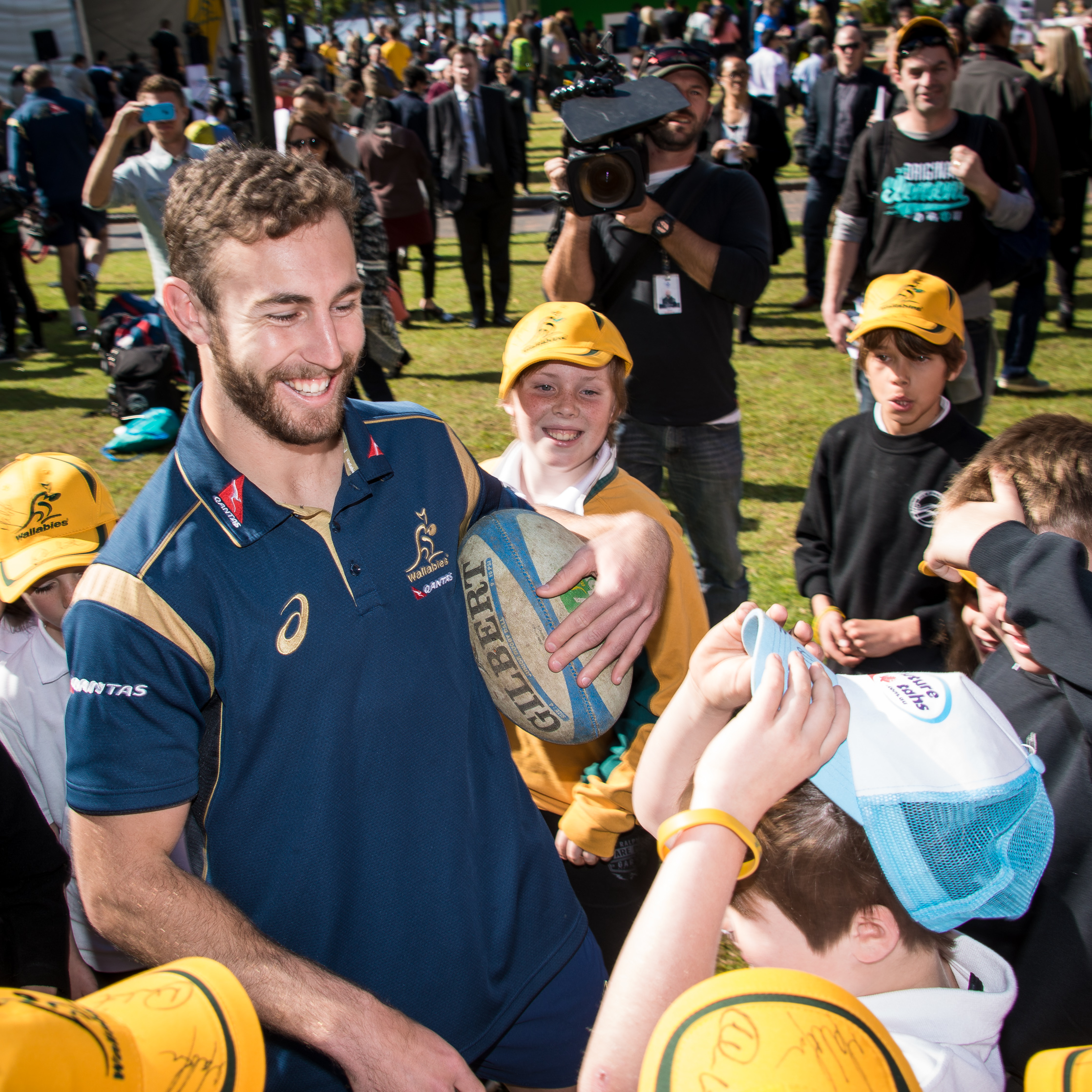
White interacting with fans

Signed by the Brumbies in 2008, he represented Australia at the 2009 World Rugby Under 20 Championship in Japan where Australia made the semi-finals and again represented Australia U20 in the 2010 championship in Argentina where Australia were beaten in the final by New Zealand.

White made his debut for Australia against Argentina in Perth in 2013 a narrow victory for Australia. He started all three tests in the June series against France in 2014, which the Wallabies won 3-0. He came off the bench in 2015 against New Zealand in Sydney, with the Wallabies posting their first win over the All Blacks since 2011.

In August 2025, he retired from international rugby after a 22–12 victory in the third test of the 2025 British & Irish Lions tour. Just two weeks later and ahead of the 2025 Rugby Championship, he reversed his decision after being persuaded to return by head coach Joe Schmidt because of injuries in the wider squad. In the opening fixture of the Rugby Championship, having been 22–0 down to South Africa after 20 minutes, he was part of the side that scored 38 unanswered points coming back to win 38–22. This was also the first time Australia had won at Ellis Park since 1963. In September 2025, he was believed to have retired for a second time mid-way throughout the tournament after a 28–26 defeat to Argentina before reversing the decision again to join the training squad following an injury to Tate McDermott ahead of their second fixture against New Zealand.

== Career statistics ==
=== List of international tries ===
No.	Date	Venue	Opponent	Score	Result	Competition
1	8 August 2015	ANZ Stadium, Sydney, Australia	New Zealand	25–19	27–19	2015 Rugby Championship
2	10 August 2019	Optus Stadium, Perth, Australia	New Zealand	33–12	47–26	2019 Rugby Championship
3	11 October 2019	Shizuoka Stadium Ecopa, Fukuroi, Japan	Georgia	5–0	27–8	2019 Rugby World Cup
4	5 September 2021	Optus Stadium, Perth, Australia	New Zealand	12–28	21–38	2021 Rugby Championship
5	20 November 2021	Principality Stadium, Cardiff, Wales	Wales	18–23	28–29	2021 end-of-year rugby union internationals
6	15 July 2023	Western Sydney Stadium, Sydney, Australia	Argentina	15–17	31–34	2023 Rugby Championship

as of 10 August 2023
