= James Horwill =

Australia international rugby union player

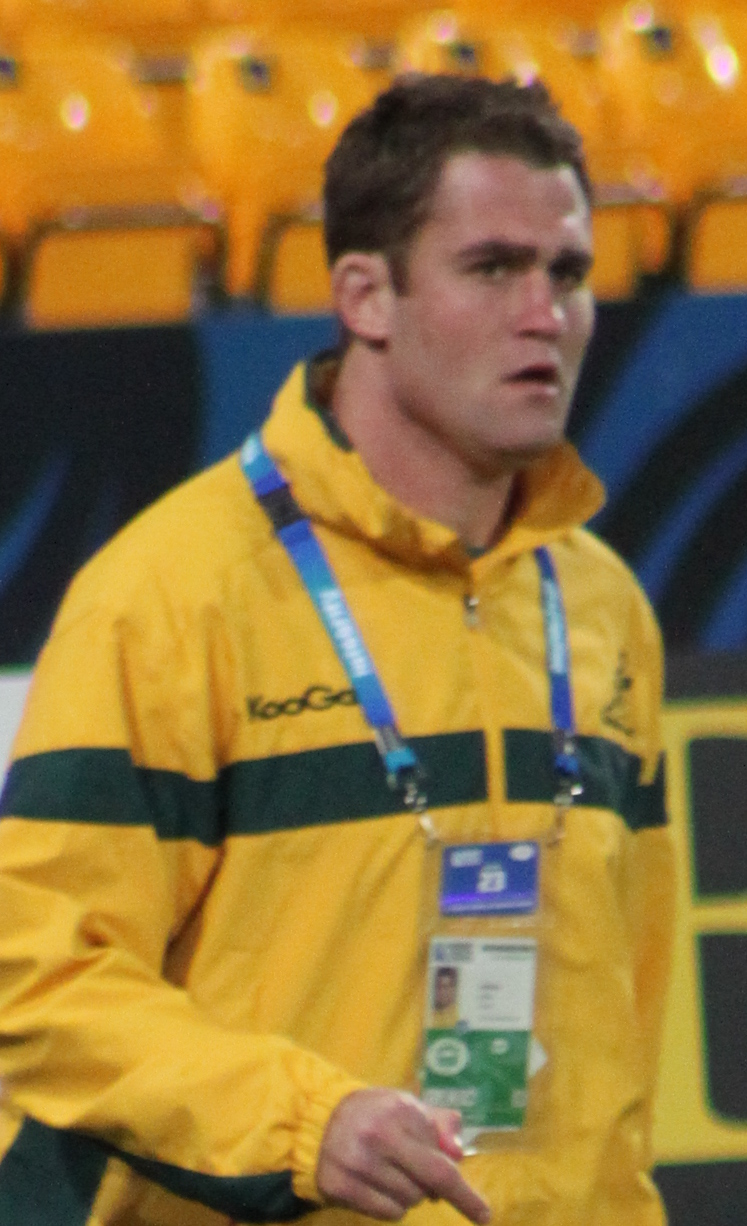
- Born: James Horwill; 29 May 1985 (age 41) Brisbane, Queensland, Australia
- Height: 200 cm (6 ft 7 in)
- Weight: 117 kg (18 st 6 lb)
- School: Brisbane Boys College

Rugby union career
- Position: Lock
Senior career
Years	Team	Apps	(Points)
2007	Ballymore Tornadoes	8	(0)
2014–2015	Brisbane City	1	(0)
2015−2019	Harlequins	66	(25)
- Correct as of 6 May 2017
Super Rugby
Years	Team	Apps	(Points)
2006–2015	Queensland Reds	116	(45)
- Correct as of 14 June 2015
International career
Years	Team	Apps	(Points)
2007–2016	Australia	62	(30)
- Correct as of 11 June 2016
Medal record
Men's rugby union
Representing Australia
Rugby World Cup
Bronze medal – third place	2011 New Zealand	Squad

James Horwill (born 29 May 1985) is an Australian former rugby union player, who has played for the Australian national side, with 61 caps to his name. He captained the Wallabies a number of times, including during the 2011 Rugby World Cup. Horwill played ten seasons in Super Rugby for the Queensland Reds, followed by four seasons with English club Harlequins. His position was second row.

== Personal life ==
Horwill was born in Brisbane, Queensland, and educated at Brisbane Boys College.

As of February 2016, he was living in south west London, with his wife. James has a multimillion-dollar Brisbane property portfolio.

== Club career ==
=== Queensland Reds ===
Horwill made his Super 14 debut against arch rivals the New South Wales Waratahs in the first game of the 2006 season, after not even being included in the Reds original squad.

Horwill captained the Queensland Reds to a season victory in the 2011 in the Super Rugby competition, his sixth season played at that level

Overall, Horwill played more than 129 times for the Queensland Reds, including 116 Super Rugby caps for the Reds. When his departure was announced the Queensland Rugby CEO Jim Carmichael described him as "one of the great modern-day sporting treasures of Queensland."

=== Harlequins ===
On 17 December 2014, it was announced that Horwill had signed a three-year contract with English Premiership side Harlequins. He made his competitive debut in Quins' season opener against Wasps FC on 16 October 2015 and immediately established himself as a first choice in the team. He scored his debut points with a try in the match against Saracens F.C. on 9 January 2016. He also captained the side in the absence of Quins' England players.

Horwill played his last season for Harlequins in 2018-19 before retiring from professional rugby. He then played for Cambridge University R.U.F.C. in the 2019 Varsity match.

== International career ==
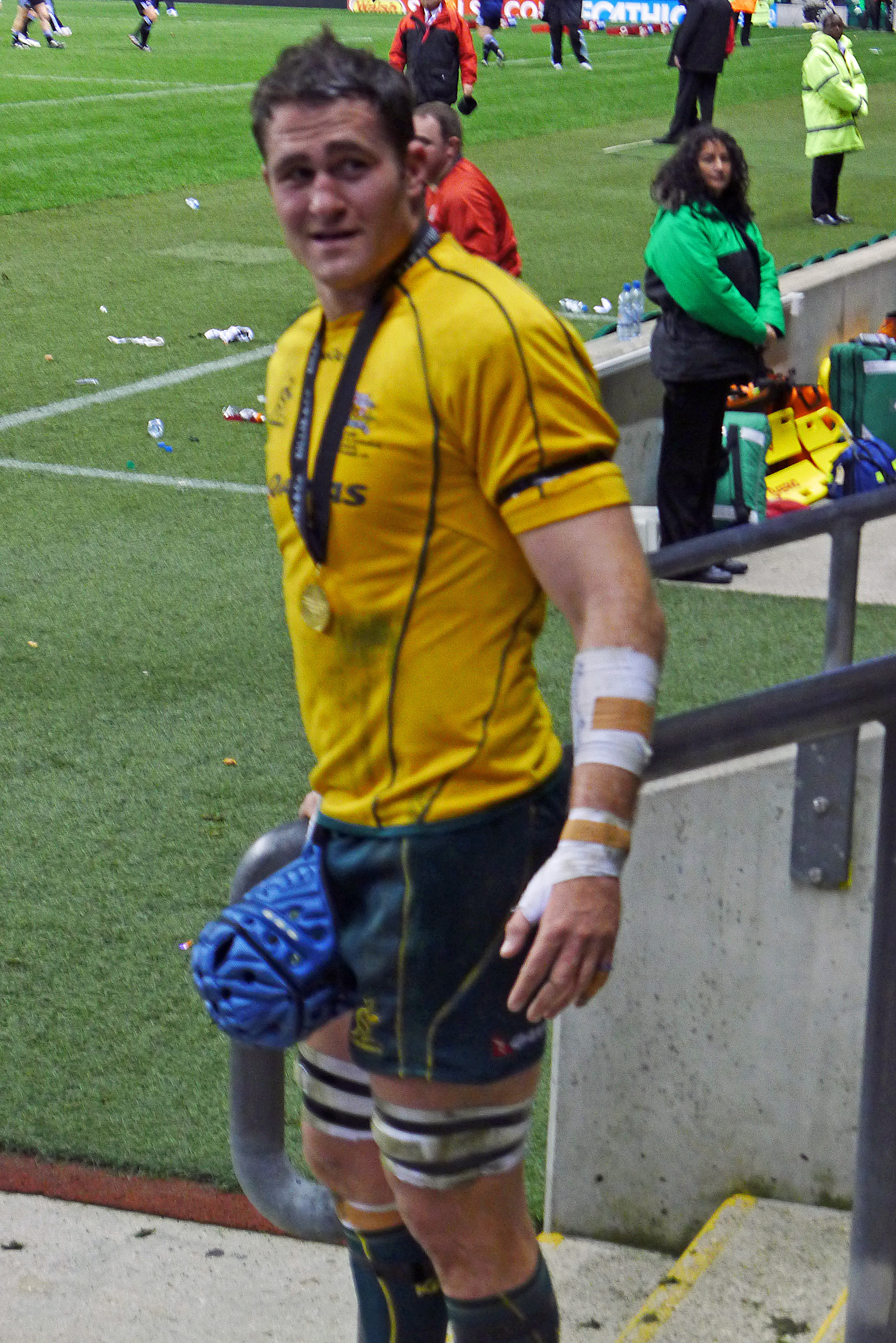
Horwill in 2011

Horwill proved to be the find of the 2006 season, forcing his way into the starting line up and earning a place in the Wallabies spring tour, playing for Australia A in all three of the matches.

In 2007, Horwill made his debut for the Wallabies in a test match against Fiji playing the entire game, and was unlucky to not have been included in the 2007 Rugby World Cup squad. 2008 was a successful year for Horwill, as he broke into the starting Wallabies team and played 9 games in 2008, starting against New Zealand in the Bledisloe Cup.

In August 2011, Robbie Deans named James Horwill as captain for the 2011 Rugby World Cup in New Zealand. He debuted as captain in the deciding match of the 2011 Tri Nations series on 27 August 2011 and led the Wallabies to a series victory.

Horwill was captain of the Wallabies for the British and Irish Lions tour to Australia in 2013. Controversially, after an appeal by the IRB, Horwill was cleared of allegedly stamping on Alun Wyn Jones face during the first test.

He played his final game for the Wallabies in The Rugby Championship game against the All Blacks in Auckland on 15 August 2015. The following week, Australian coach Michael Cheika decided to leave Horwill out of his 31-man squad for the 2015 Rugby World Cup, a move which surprised some observers.

Preceded by Rocky Elsom	Australian national rugby union captain 2011 - 2013	Succeeded by Will Genia
