= Fainga'a =

Fainga'a is a surname of Tongan origin. It may refer to:

- Anthony Fainga'a (born 1987), Australian Rugby Union player, twin brother of Saia Fainga'a
- Saia Fainga'a (born 1987), Australian Rugby Union player, twin brother of Anthony Fainga'a
- Vili Fainga'a (born 1988), Australian Rugby Union player, younger brother of Saia and Anthony Fainga'a
- Colby Fainga'a (born 1991), Australian Rugby Union player, younger brother of Anthony, Saia and Vili Fainga'a
- Folau Fainga'a (born 1995), Australian Rugby Union player
