= 2011 Super Rugby season =

Men's rugby union club competition

- Countries: Australia; New Zealand; South Africa
- Number of teams: 15
- Date: 18 February – 9 July 2011
- Champions: Reds (1st title)
- Runners-up: Crusaders
- Matches played: 125
- Attendance: 2,370,879 (average 18,967 per match)
- Highest attendance: 52,113 (Reds 18–13 Crusaders; 9 July 2011)
- Tries scored: 559 (average 4.5 per match)
- Top point scorer: Quade Cooper, Reds (228)
- Top try scorer: Bjorn Basson, Bulls (9); Sean Maitland, Crusaders (9); Sarel Pretorius, Cheetahs (9)

Official website
- superrugby.com

The 2011 Super Rugby season was the first season of the new 15-team format for the Super Rugby competition, which involved teams from Australia, New Zealand and South Africa. Including its past iterations as Super 12 and Super 14, this was the 16th season for the Southern Hemisphere's premier transnational club competition. The season kicked off in February 2011, with pre-season matches held from mid-January. It finished in early July to allow players a recovery period for the 2011 Rugby World Cup to be held in September and October; in future non-World Cup years, the competition will extend into August.

This season saw the arrival of the Melbourne Rebels, admitted to the competition as Australia's fifth team after entry by the Southern Kings from South Africa was denied. This was also the first season of a revamped competition format, with a greater focus on matches within each participating country and an expanded finals series.

During this season, the first ever Super Rugby game was played outside the SANZAR region, taking place at Twickenham Stadium between the Crusaders and the Sharks. The match was moved to Twickenham because of the February 2011 Christchurch earthquake. Proceeds of the game were also donated to the relief effort.

The final was played at Suncorp Stadium in Brisbane between the Queensland Reds and the Crusaders. The Reds won 18–13 to claim their first Super Rugby title.

== Background ==
=== Competition format ===
Covering 21 weeks, the schedule featured a total of 125 matches. The 15 teams were grouped by geography, labelled the Australian Conference, New Zealand Conference and the South African Conference. With the new format, the regular season consisted of two types of matches:

- Internal Conference Matches – Each team plays the other four teams in the same conference twice, home and away. (See table below for conferences.)
- Cross Conference Matches – Each team plays four teams of the other two conferences away, and four teams of the other two conferences home, thus missing out on two teams (one from each of the other conferences). Each team plays two home and two away games against teams from each of the other countries, making a total of eight cross conference games for each team.

The top team of each conference, plus the next top three teams in table points regardless of conference (wild card teams), moved on to the finals. The top two conference winners, based on table points, receive first-round byes. In the first round of the finals, the third conference winner is the No. 3 seed and hosts the wild card team with the worst record, and the best wild card team hosts the second-best wild card team. In the semi-finals, the No. 2 conference winner hosts the higher surviving seed from the first round, and the No. 1 conference winner hosts the other first-round winner. The final is hosted by the top remaining seed.

== Teams and personnel ==
=== Overview ===
Union	Team	Stadia information			Coach	Captain
Union	Team	Stadia	Capacity	Location	Coach	Captain
Australia	Brumbies	Canberra Stadium	25,011	Bruce, Australian Capital Territory	Tony Rea	Matt Giteau
Australia	Force	Perth Rectangular Stadium	20,500	Perth, Western Australia	Richard Graham	Nathan Sharpe
Australia	Reds	Lang Park	52,500	Milton, Queensland	Ewen McKenzie	James Horwill
Australia	Rebels	Melbourne Rectangular Stadium	30,050	Olympic Park, Victoria	Rod Macqueen	Stirling Mortlock
Australia	Waratahs	Sydney Football Stadium	45,500	Moore Park, New South Wales	Chris Hickey	Phil Waugh
Australia	Waratahs	Stadium Australia	83,000	Sydney Olympic Park, New South Wales	Chris Hickey	Phil Waugh
New Zealand	Blues	Eden Park	50,000	Kingsland, Auckland	Pat Lam	Keven Mealamu
New Zealand	Blues	Okara Park	18,500	Whangārei, Northland	Pat Lam	Keven Mealamu
New Zealand	Blues	North Harbour Stadium	14,000	Albany, Auckland	Pat Lam	Keven Mealamu
New Zealand	Chiefs	Waikato Stadium	25,800	Hamilton, Waikato	Ian Foster	Mils Muliaina
New Zealand	Chiefs	Baypark Stadium	19,800	Tauranga	Ian Foster	Mils Muliaina
New Zealand	Crusaders	Trafalgar Park (Note: Due to the damage caused to the Crusaders' Lancaster Park home ground from the 2011 Christchurch earthquake, they played their entire 2011 season at alternative venues, including one at Twickenham Stadium, London.)	18,000	Nelson	Todd Blackadder	Richie McCaw
New Zealand	Crusaders	Fraser Park	12,500	Timaru, Canterbury	Todd Blackadder	Richie McCaw
New Zealand	Crusaders	McLean Park	19,700	Napier, Hawke's Bay	Todd Blackadder	Richie McCaw
New Zealand	Highlanders	Carisbrook	29,000	Dunedin, Otago	Jamie Joseph	Jamie Mackintosh
New Zealand	Highlanders	Rugby Park Stadium	18,000	Invercargill, Southland	Jamie Joseph	Jamie Mackintosh
New Zealand	Hurricanes	Wellington Regional Stadium	34,500	Pipitea, Wellington	Mark Hammett	Andrew Hore
New Zealand	Hurricanes	McLean Park	19,700	Napier, Hawke's Bay	Mark Hammett	Andrew Hore
New Zealand	Hurricanes	Arena Manawatu	15,000	Palmerston North Central, Manawatū–Whanganui	Mark Hammett	Andrew Hore
South Africa	Bulls	Loftus Versfeld Stadium	51,762	Pretoria, Gauteng	Frans Ludeke	Victor Matfield
South Africa	Cheetahs	Free State Stadium	42,000	Bloemfontein, Free State	Naka Drotské	Juan Smith
South Africa	Lions	Ellis Park Stadium	62,567	Doornfontein, Gauteng	John Mitchell	Franco van der Merwe
South Africa	Sharks	Kings Park Stadium	52,500	Stamford Hill, KwaZulu-Natal	John Plumtree	John Smit
South Africa	Stormers	Newlands Stadium	51,900	Cape Town, Western Cape	Allister Coetzee	Schalk Burger

=== Locations ===
2011 Super Rugby season (Oceania)
Home locations of all the 2011 Super Rugby teams

== Standings ==
=== Conference standings ===
Australian Conference
Pos	Team	Pts
1	Reds	66
2	Waratahs	57
3	Force	37
4	Brumbies	33
5	Rebels	24

New Zealand Conference
Pos	Team	Pts
1	Crusaders	61
2	Blues	60
3	Highlanders	45
4	Hurricanes	42
5	Chiefs	40

South African conference
Pos	Team	Pts
1	Stormers	63
2	Sharks	57
3	Bulls	54
4	Cheetahs	40
5	Lions	29

=== Overall standings ===
Pos	Team	Pld	W	D	L	PF	PA	PD	TF	TA	TB	LB	Pts	Qualification
1	Reds (C)	16	13	0	3	429	309	+120	45	32	5	1	66	Semi-finals
2	Stormers	16	12	0	4	400	257	+143	34	18	4	3	63	Semi-finals
3	Crusaders	16	11	1	4	436	273	+163	46	27	5	2	61	Qualifying finals
4	Blues	16	10	1	5	405	335	+70	43	35	6	4	60	Qualifying finals
5	Waratahs	16	10	0	6	398	252	+146	48	22	6	3	57	Qualifying finals
6	Sharks	16	10	1	5	407	339	+68	41	28	6	1	57	Qualifying finals
7	Bulls	16	10	0	6	416	370	+46	40	37	3	3	54	
8	Highlanders	16	8	0	8	296	343	−47	31	34	2	3	45	
9	Hurricanes	16	5	2	9	328	398	−70	32	41	5	5	42	
10	Chiefs	16	6	1	9	332	348	−16	34	31	2	4	40	
11	Cheetahs	16	5	0	11	435	437	−2	44	48	5	7	40	
12	Force	16	5	2	9	333	416	−83	25	42	0	5	37	
13	Brumbies	16	4	1	11	314	437	−123	32	42	3	4	33	
14	Lions	16	3	1	12	351	477	−126	36	49	2	5	29	
15	Rebels	16	3	0	13	281	570	−289	29	74	2	2	24	

Source: Super Rugby, Super XV

== Fixtures ==
=== Round 1 ===
18 February 2011	Hurricanes	9–14	Highlanders	Westpac Stadium, Wellington
19:35	Pen: Aaron Cruden (3) 12', 29', 61'; Cards: Ma'a Nonu (yellow card) 29' (yellow-red card) 50'	Report	Try: Lima Sopoaga 20'; Pen: Lima Sopoaga 31'; Robbie Robinson 63'; Cards: Brayden Mitchell (yellow card) 70'	Attendance: 11,250; Referee: Stuart Dickinson

18 February 2011	Rebels	0–43	Waratahs	AAMI Park, Melbourne
19:40	Cards: Ged Robinson (yellow card) 43'	Report	Try: Kurtley Beale (2) 25', 52'; Drew Mitchell (2) 32', 47'; Tatafu Polota-Nau 44'; Rob Horne 61'; Phil Waugh 66'; Con: Berrick Barnes (3) 48', 53', 61'; Kurtley Beale 67'	Attendance: 25,524; Referee: Mark Lawrence

19 February 2011	Blues	24–22	Crusaders	Eden Park, Auckland
19:35	Try: Benson Stanley 50'; Tony Woodcock 62'; Keven Mealamu 71'; Pen: Stephen Brett (3) 10', 14', 58'	Report	Try: Sean Maitland 21'; Andy Ellis 39'; Pen: Dan Carter (4) 2', 17', 30', 54'	Attendance: 30,002; Referee: Chris Pollock

19 February 2011	Brumbies	28–20	Chiefs	Canberra Stadium, Canberra
19:40	Try: Robbie Coleman 13'; Francis Fainifo 22'; Salesi Ma'afu 71'; Con: Matt Giteau (2) 14', 72'; Pen: Matt Giteau (3) 3', 10', 60'	Report	Try: Sitiveni Sivivatu 52'; Lelia Masaga 80'; Con: Stephen Donald 53'; Pen: Stephen Donald 38'	Attendance: 13,227; Referee: Jonathan Kaplan

19 February 2011	Sharks	24–9	Cheetahs	Mr Price Kings Park, Durban
17:05	Try: Jacques Botes 3'; Bismarck du Plessis 68'; Con: Patrick Lambie 69'; Pen: Patrick Lambie (3) 10', 49', 52'; Jacques-Louis Potgieter 76'	Report	Pen: Naas Olivier (3) 34', 44', 63'	Attendance: 26,972; Referee: Craig Joubert

19 February 2011	Lions	20–24	Bulls	Coca-Cola Park, Johannesburg
19:10	Try: Waylon Murray 36'; Martin Bezuidenhout 57'; Warren Whiteley 61'; Con: Elton Jantjies 58'; Pen: Elton Jantjies 69'	Report	Try: Zane Kirchner 15'; Gerhard van den Heever 17'; Con: Morné Steyn 18'; Pen: Morné Steyn (4) 21', 28', 39', 40'	Attendance: 42,300; Referee: Marius Jonker

20 February 2011	Reds	21–20	Force	Suncorp Stadium, Brisbane
16:40	Try: Saia Fainga'a 62'; James Hanson 75'; Con: Quade Cooper 76'; Pen: Quade Cooper (3) 4', 24', 46'	Report	Try: James O'Connor 67'; Pen: James O'Connor (5) 8', 12', 17', 40', 57'	Attendance: 26,060; Referee: Ian Smith

Bye/s: Stormers

=== Round 2 ===
25 February 2011	Highlanders	23–13	Chiefs	Carisbrook, Dunedin
19:35	Try: Nasi Manu, Kade Poki; Con: Robbie Robsinson (2); Pen: Lima Sopoaga (2), Robbie Robsinson	Report	Try: Mike Delany; Con: Mike Delany; Pen: Mike Delany (2); Cards: Tawera Kerr-Barlow (yellow card) 58'	Attendance: 10,950; Referee: Mark Lawrence

25 February 2011	Rebels	25–24	Brumbies	AAMI Park, Melbourne
19:40	Try: Stirling Mortlock; Con: Danny Cipriani; Pen: Danny Cipriani (6)	Report	Try: Pat McCabe, Henry Speight; Con: Matt Giteau; Pen: Matt Giteau (3); Drop: Matt Giteau	Attendance: 14,234; Referee: Jonathan Kaplan

25 February 2011	Cheetahs	23–25	Bulls	Free State Stadium, Bloemfontein
19:10	Try: Andries Strauss, Robert Ebersohn, Ashley Johnson; Con: Naas Olivier; Pen: Naas Olivier (2); Cards: Wilhelm Steenkamp (yellow card) 54'	Report	Try: Bakkies Botha, Danie Rossouw, Fourie du Preez; Con: Morné Steyn (2); Pen: Morné Steyn (2)	Attendance: 23,012; Referee: Craig Joubert

26 February 2011	Hurricanes	0–0 (Note: The match was cancelled and called a draw due to the 2011 Christchurch earthquake.)	Crusaders	Westpac Stadium, Wellington
19:35		Report

26 February 2011	Waratahs	30–6	Reds	ANZ Stadium, Sydney
19:40	Try: Drew Mitchell, Dave Dennis, Lachie Turner, Benn Robinson; Con: Kurtley Beale (2); Pen: Berrick Barnes (2)	Report	Pen: Quade Cooper (2)	Attendance: 33,846; Referee: Bryce Lawrence

26 February 2011	Sharks	26–12	Blues	Mr Price Kings Park, Durban
17:05	Try: Patrick Lambie, JP Pietersen; Con: Patrick Lambie (2); Pen: Patrick Lambie (4)	Report	Pen: Stephen Brett (3), Luke McAlister	Attendance: 26,812; Referee: Jaco Peyper

26 February 2011	Stormers	19–16	Lions	DHL Newlands, Cape Town
19:10	Try: Pieter Louw; Con: Peter Grant; Pen: Gary Van Aswegen (3), Peter Grant; Cards: Deon Fourie (yellow card) 23'	Report	Try: Waylon Murray, Jaco Taute; Pen: Elton Jantjies (2)	Attendance: 34,152; Referee: Stuart Dickinson

Byes: Force

=== Round 3 ===
4 March 2011	Crusaders	33–18	Waratahs	Trafalgar Park, Nelson
19:35	Try: Robbie Fruean (2), Sonny Bill Williams; Con: Dan Carter (3); Pen: Dan Carter (4)	Report	Try: Tom Carter, Luke Burgess, Afa Pakalani; Pen: Kurtley Beale	Attendance: 10,988; Referee: Chris Pollock

4 March 2011	Lions	32–41	Blues	Coca-Cola Park, Johannesburg
19:10	Try: Jano Vermaak, Warren Whiteley, Doppies la Grange, Josh Strauss; Con: Elton Jantjies (3); Pen: Elton Jantjies (2)	Report	Try: Joe Rokocoko, Jared Payne, Rene Ranger (2), Alby Mathewson; Con: Luke McAlister (4); Stephen Brett; Pen: Luke McAlister; Drop: Luke McAlister; Cards: Kurtis Haiu (yellow card) 38'	Attendance: 24,687; Referee: Jonathan Kaplan

5 March 2011	Chiefs	38–10	Rebels	Waikato Stadium, Hamilton
19:35	Try: Sitiveni Sivivatu, Lelia Masaga (2), Sona Taumalolo; Con: Stephen Donald (3); Pen: Stephen Donald (3)	Report	Try: Gareth Delve; Con: Danny Cipriani; Pen: Danny Cipriani	Attendance: 5,500; Referee: Vinny Munro

5 March 2011	Brumbies	25–31	Reds	Canberra Stadium, Canberra
19:40	Try: Stephen Moore, Pat McCabe, Ita Vaea, Ben Alexander; Con: Matt Giteau; Pen: Matt Giteau	Report	Try: Scott Higginbotham; Con: Quade Cooper; Pen: Quade Cooper (7); Drop: Quade Cooper; Cards: Ben Daley (yellow card) 37'	Attendance: 16,027; Referee: Mark Lawrence

5 March 2011	Force	12–39	Sharks	nib Stadium, Perth
19:05	Pen: James O'Connor (4); Cards: Rory Sidey (red card) 17'; Nick Cummins (yellow card) 77'	Report	Try: Odwa Ndungane, Bismarck du Plessis, Steven Sykes, Willem Alberts, Patrick Lambie; Con: Patrick Lambie (3); Pen: Patrick Lambie (2)	Attendance: 17,620; Referee: Keith Brown

5 March 2011	Stormers	21–15	Cheetahs	DHL Newlands, Cape Town
17:05	Pen: Peter Grant (7)	Report	Pen: Naas Olivier (4), Riaan Viljoen	Attendance: 31,497; Referee: Pro Legoete

5 March 2011	Bulls	28–35	Highlanders	Loftus Versfeld, Pretoria
19:10	Try: Flip van der Merwe, Fourie du Preez, Bjorn Basson; Con: Morné Steyn (2); Pen: Morné Steyn (3); Cards: Deon Stegmann (yellow card) 39'	Report	Try: Adam Thomson, Josh Bekhuis, Kade Poki (2); Con: Tony Brown (3); Pen: Robbie Robinson (2), Tony Brown; Cards: Alando Soakai (yellow card) 72'	Attendance: 26,852; Referee: Stuart Dickinson

Byes: Hurricanes

=== Round 4 ===
11 March 2011	Crusaders	52–10	Brumbies	Trafalgar Park, Nelson
19:35	Try: Sean Maitland (4), Sonny Bill Williams, Israel Dagg; Con: Dan Carter (4), Matt Berquist; Pen: Dan Carter (4)	Report	Try: Matt Giteau; Con: Matt Giteau; Pen: Matt Giteau; Cards: Matt Giteau (yellow card) 22'	Attendance: 11,000; Referee: Garratt Williamson

11 March 2011	Rebels	32–34	Sharks	AAMI Park, Melbourne
19:40	Try: Cooper Vuna, Julian Huxley, Danny Cipriani, Jarrod Saffy; Con: Danny Cipriani (3); Pen: Danny Cipriani (2); Cards: Cooper Vuna (yellow card) 54'	Report	Try: Bismarck du Plessis, Lwazi Mvovo, Ryan Kankowski, Jacques-Louis Potgieter; Con: Patrick Lambie (4); Pen: Patrick Lambie (2)	Attendance: 15,126; Referee: Chris Pollock

11 March 2011	Stormers	18–6	Highlanders	DHL Newlands, Cape Town
19:10	Pen: Peter Grant (6); Cards: Andries Bekker (yellow card) 35'	Report	Pen: Robbie Robinson (2); Cards: Jarrad Hoeata (yellow card) 35'	Attendance: 32,436; Referee: Steve Walsh

12 March 2011	Hurricanes	29–26	Chiefs	Westpac Stadium, Wellington
19:35	Try: John Schwalger, Tyson Keats; Con: Aaron Cruden, Daniel Kirkpatrick; Pen: Aaron Cruden (3), Daniel Kirkpatrick (2)	Report	Try: Stephen Donald, Scott Waldrom, Tim Nanai-Williams; Con: Stephen Donald; Pen: Stephen Donald (2), Mike Delany	Attendance: 12,872; Referee: Marius Jonker

12 March 2011	Force	22–22	Blues	nib Stadium, Perth
19:05	Try: Nick Cummins; Con: James O'Connor; Pen: James O'Connor (5); Cards: Jono Jenkins (yellow card) 75'	Report	Try: Keven Mealamu; Con: Stephen Brett; Pen: Luke McAlister (4), Stephen Brett	Attendance: 15,931; Referee: Nathan Pearce

12 March 2011	Cheetahs	20–25	Lions	Free State Stadium, Bloemfontein
17:05	Try: Andries Strauss; Pen: Sias Ebersohn (5)	Report	Try: Lionel Mapoe, Derick Minnie; Pen: Elton Jantjies (5); Cards: James Kamana (yellow card) 55'	Attendance: 5,000; Referee: Keith Brown

Byes: Bulls, Reds, Waratahs

=== Round 5 ===
18 March 2011	Chiefs	15–9	Sharks	Waikato Stadium, Hamilton
19:35	Pen: Tim Nanai-Williams, Mike Delany (4)	Report	Pen: Patrick Lambie (3)	Attendance: 8,428; Referee: Garratt Williamson

18 March 2011	Reds	53–3	Rebels	Suncorp Stadium, Brisbane
19:40	Try: Anthony Fainga'a, Adam Wallace-Harrison, Scott Higginbotham, Ben Daley, Mike Harris (2), Luke Morahan; Con: Quade Cooper (5) Mike Harris (1); Pen: Quade Cooper (2)	Report	Pen: Danny Cipriani	Attendance: 22,031; Referee: Stuart Dickinson

19 March 2011	Highlanders	13–44	Crusaders	Carisbrook, Dunedin
17:30	Try: Adam Thomson; Con: Robbie Robinson; Pen: Tony Brown (2)	Report	Try: Robbie Fruean, Kieran Read, Israel Dagg (2), Kahn Fotuali'i, Wyatt Crockett; Con: Dan Carter (3), Matt Berquist; Pen: Dan Carter (3); Cards: Sam Whitelock (yellow card) 34'	Attendance: 20,700; Referee: Marius Jonker

19 March 2011	Blues	41–17	Hurricanes	Eden Park, Auckland
19:35	Try: Rene Ranger, Stephen Brett, Lachie Munro, Alby Mathewson, Jared Payne; Con: Luke McAlister (2), Lachie Munro (3); Pen: Luke McAlister (2)	Report	Try: Neemia Tialata; Pen: Daniel Kirkpatrick (4); Cards: Andrew Hore (yellow card) 64'	Attendance: 22,507; Referee: Vinny Munro

19 March 2011	Waratahs	3–23	Cheetahs	Sydney Football Stadium, Sydney
19:40	Pen: Kurtley Beale	Report	Try: Phillip Snyman, Sarel Pretorius; Con: Sias Ebersohn (2); Pen: Sias Ebersohn (3)	Attendance: 15,849; Referee: Chris Pollock

19 March 2011	Lions	15–27	Force	Coca-Cola Park, Johannesburg
17:05	Pen: Elton Jantjies (4); Drop: Elton Jantjies	Report	Try: Nick Cummins, Alfie Mafi; Con: Cameron Shepherd; Pen: James O'Connor (5); Cards: James O'Connor (yellow card) 51'	Attendance: 13,535; Referee: Mark Lawrence

19 March 2011	Bulls	13–23	Stormers	Loftus Versfeld, Pretoria
19:10	Try: Bjorn Basson; Con: Morné Steyn; Pen: Morne Steyn (2)	Report	Try: Bryan Habana; Pen: Peter Grant (6)	Attendance: 47,101; Referee: Keith Brown

Byes: Brumbies

=== Round 6 ===
25 March 2011	Rebels	42–25	Hurricanes	AAMI Park, Melbourne
19:40	Try: Rodney Blake, Alister Campbell (2), Michael Lipman, Cooper Vuna, Nick Phipps; Con: Danny Cipriani (3); Pen: Danny Cipriani (2)	Report	Try: Chris Eaton, Victor Vito, Daniel Kirkpatrick, Dane Coles; Con: Daniel Kirkpatrick; Pen: Daniel Kirkpatrick	Attendance: 16,809; Referee: Jaco Peyper

26 March 2011	Reds	41–8	Cheetahs	Suncorp Stadium, Brisbane
14:40	Try: Digby Ioane, Rod Davies (2), Saia Fainga'a, Will Genia (2); Con: Quade Cooper (3), Mike Harris; Pen: Quade Cooper	Report	Try: Wilhelm Steenkamp; Pen: Sias Ebersohn	Attendance: 19,579

26 March 2011	Chiefs	13–16	Blues	Waikato Stadium, Hamilton
19:35	Try: Liam Messam, Sona Taumalolo; Pen: Mike Delany	Report	Try: Jared Payne, Con: Luke McAlister; Pen: Luke McAlister (3)	Attendance: 9,098

26 March 2011	Brumbies	22–29	Waratahs	Canberra Stadium, Canberra
19:40	Try: Ben Alexander; Con: Matt Giteau; Pen: Matt Giteau (5)	Report	Try: Ryan Cross, Sitaleki Timani; Con: Kurtley Beale (2); Pen: Kurtley Beale (5)	Attendance: 18,011

26 March 2011	Stormers	51–16	Force	DHL Newlands, Cape Town
15:00	Try: Jaque Fourie (2), Deon Fourie (2), Jean de Villiers, Andries Bekker; Con: Peter Grant (6); Pen: Peter Grant (3)		Try: James O'Connor; Con: James O'Connor; Pen: James O'Connor (3)	Attendance: 31,591; Referee: Pro Legoete

26 March 2011	Bulls	30–23	Lions	Loftus Versfeld, Pretoria
17:05	Try: Dewald Potgieter, Gary Botha, Bjorn Basson; Con: Morné Steyn (3); Pen: Morné Steyn (3)	Report	Try: Deon van Rensburg, Franco van der Merwe; Con: André Pretorius (2); Pen: Elton Jantjies (3)	Attendance: 25,169

27 March 2011	Crusaders	44–28	Sharks	Twickenham, London
16:00	Try: Sean Maitland(2), Dan Carter, Zac Guildford, Israel Dagg; Con: Dan Carter (4), Matt Berquist; Pen: Dan Carter (3)	Report	Try: Willem Alberts, Jacques-Louis Potgieter, Alistair Hargreaves, Odwa Ndungane; Con: Jacques-Louis Potgieter; Pen: Jacques-Louis Potgieter (2)	Attendance: 35,094

Byes: Highlanders

=== Round 7 ===
1 April 2011	Highlanders	26–20	Brumbies	Rugby Park, Invercargill
19:35	Try: Jason Rutledge (2), Jamie Mackintosh; Con: Colin Slade; Pen: Colin Slade, Tony Brown (2)	Report	Try: Matt Giteau, Andrew Smith, Patrick Phibbs; Con: Matt Giteau; Pen: Matt Giteau	Attendance: 6,500; Referee: Stuart Dickinson

1 April 2011	Waratahs	23–16	Chiefs	Sydney Football Stadium, Sydney
19:40	Try: Atieli Pakalani, Penalty try Con: Kurtley Beale (2); Pen: Kurtley Beale (3)	Report	Try: Tim Nanai-Williams; Con: Mike Delany; Pen: Mike Delany (2), Tim Nanai-Williams	Attendance: 20,720; Referee: Jaco Peyper

2 April 2011	Blues	29–22	Cheetahs	Toll Stadium, Whangārei
17:30	Try: Joe Rokocoko, Stephen Brett, Peter Saili, Isaia Toeava; Con: Luke McAlister (3); Pen: Luke McAlister	Report	Try: Sarel Pretorius (2), Coenraad Oosthuizen; Con: Naas Olivier (2); Pen: Sias Ebersohn	Attendance: 9,100; Referee: Bryce Lawrence

2 April 2011	Hurricanes	14–26	Bulls	McLean Park, Napier
19:35	Try: Serge Lilo; Pen: Daniel Kirkpatrick (2), Aaron Cruden	Report	Try: Francois Hougaard; Pen: Morné Steyn (5); Drop: Morné Steyn (2)	Attendance: 10,750; Referee: Steve Walsh

2 April 2011	Force	25–26	Rebels	nib Stadium, Perth
19:05	Try: Sam Wykes, Nathan Charles, Rory Sidey; Con: James O'Connor (2); Pen: James O'Connor (2)	Report	Try: Mark Gerrard, Hugh Pyle, Richard Kingi; Con: Danny Cipriani; Pen: Danny Cipriani (3)	Attendance: 15,118; Referee: Craig Joubert

2 April 2011	Lions	25–30	Reds	Coca-Cola Park, Johannesburg
15:00	Try: Michael Killian, Jaco Taute; Pen: André Pretorius (4), Rory Kockott	Report	Try: Luke Morahan, Quade Cooper, Digby Ioane; Con: Mike Harris (3); Pen: Mike Harris (3)	Attendance: 13,119; Referee: Vinny Munro

2 April 2011	Sharks	6–16	Stormers	Mr Price Kings Park, Durban
17:05	Pen: Jacques-Louis Potgieter (2)	Report	Try: Schalk Burger; Con: Peter Grant; Pen: Peter Grant (3)	Attendance: 34,071; Referee: Jonathan Kaplan

Byes: Crusaders

=== Round 8 ===
8 April 2011	Highlanders	24–21	Cheetahs	Carisbrook, Dunedin
19:35	Try: Adam Thomson (2), Kendrick Lynn; Con: Colin Slade (3); Pen: Colin Slade	Report	Try: W. P. Nel, Robert Ebersohn, Philip Burger; Con: Sias Ebersohn (3)	Attendance: 6,500; Referee: Nathan Pearce

9 April 2011	Crusaders	27–0	Bulls	Fraser Park, Timaru
19:35	Try: Sonny Bill Williams, Israel Dagg, Tom Marshall; Pen: Matt Berquist (4)	Report		Attendance: 11,000; Referee: Jonathon White

9 April 2011	Brumbies	17–16	Hurricanes	Canberra Stadium, Canberra
19:40	Try: Henry Speight; Pen: Matt Giteau (4)	Report	Try: Aaron Cruden; Con: Aaron Cruden; Pen: Aaron Cruden, Daniel Kirkpatrick (2)	Attendance: 12,233; Referee: Craig Joubert

9 April 2011	Force	3–31	Waratahs	nib Stadium, Perth
20:05	Pen: James O'Connor	Report	Try: Tom Carter, Drew Mitchell (2), Kurtley Beale; Con: Kurtley Beale (4); Pen: Kurtley Beale	Attendance: 14,578; Referee: Garratt Williamson

9 April 2011	Stormers	6–19	Reds	DHL Newlands, Cape Town
17:05	Pen: Peter Grant (2)	Report	Try: Mike Harris; Con: Quade Cooper; Pen: Quade Cooper (4)	Attendance: 40,000; Referee: Jaco Peyper

9 April 2011	Sharks	27–3	Lions	Mr Price Kings Park, Durban
19:10	Try: Willem Alberts, JP Pietersen, Charl McLeod, Louis Ludik; Con: Meyer Bosman, Jacques-Louis Potgieter; Pen: Jacques-Louis Potgieter	Report	Pen: Elton Jantjies	Attendance: 25,127; Referee: Jonathan Kaplan

Byes: Blues, Chiefs, Rebels

=== Round 9 ===
15 April 2011	Chiefs	16–34	Crusaders	Baypark Stadium, Mount Maunganui
19:35	Try: Lelia Masaga; Con: Mike Delany; Pen: Mike Delany (3)	Report	Try: Robbie Fruean, Sean Maitland, Andy Ellis, Luke Romano; Con: Matt Berquist (4); Pen: Matt Berquist (2)	Attendance: 16,500; Referee: Craig Joubert

15 April 2011	Rebels	18–40	Highlanders	AAMI Park, Melbourne
19:40	Try: Hugh Pyle, Greg Somerville; Con: Danny Cipriani; Pen: Danny Cipriani (2)	Report	Try: Adam Thomson (2), Alando Soakai, Siale Piutau (2), Kade Poki; Con: Robbie Robinson (2); Pen: Robbie Robinson (2)	Attendance: 18,739; Referee: Garratt Williamson

16 April 2011	Blues	31–17	Waratahs	Eden Park, Auckland
19:35	Try: John Afoa, Tevita Mailau, Jared Payne, Rene Ranger, Alby Mathewson; Con: Luke McAlister (3)	Report	Try: Daniel Halangahu, Drew Mitchell, Ryan Cross; Con: Kurtley Beale	Attendance: 17,200

16 April 2011	Reds	39–30	Bulls	Suncorp Stadium, Brisbane
19:40	Try: Quade Cooper 6'c, Radike Samo 37'c, Luke Morahan (2) 48'm, 56'm Digby Ioane 67'm, James Horwill 72'm Con: Quade Cooper (3); Drop: Quade Cooper 34'c	Report	Try: Bjorn Basson (2) 38'm, 77'm, Danie Rossouw 70'c Con: Morné Steyn (3); Pen: Morné Steyn (3)	Attendance: 26,266

16 April 2011	Lions	19–33	Stormers	Coca-Cola Park, Johannesburg
17:05	Try: Warren Whiteley; Con: Burton Francis; Pen: Burton Francis (3); Drop: Burton Francis	Report	Try: Danie Poolman, Jaque Fourie, Johann Sadie; Con: Dewaldt Duvenage, Lionel Cronjé (2); Pen: Gary van Aswegen, Lionel Cronjé (3)	Attendance: 17,319

16 April 2011	Cheetahs	47–50	Hurricanes	Free State Stadium, Bloemfontein
19:10	Try: Sarel Pretorius (3), Riaan Smit (2); Con: Sias Ebersohn (5); Pen: Sias Ebersohn (2); Drop: Sias Ebersohn (2)	Report	Try: Hosea Gear (2), Jack Lam, Andre Taylor, Alapati Leiua, Jeremy Thrush; Con: Daniel Kirkpatrick (3), Beauden Barrett; Pen: Daniel Kirkpatrick (4)	Attendance: 7,000; Referee: Stuart Dickinson

17 April 2011	Brumbies	19–27	Force	Canberra Stadium, Canberra
16:10	Try: Matt Giteau; Con: Matt Giteau; Pen: Matt Giteau (4)	Report	Try: James O'Connor, David Smith (2); Con: William Ripia, James O'Connor (2); Pen: James O'Connor (2)	Attendance: 13,123; Referee: Keith Brown

Byes: Sharks

=== Round 10 ===
22 April 2011	Blues	40–23	Rebels	North Harbour Stadium, Auckland
19:35	Try: Rene Ranger (2), Joe Rokocoko, Benson Stanley, Jared Payne, Luke Braid; Con: Stephen Brett, Luke McAlister; Pen: Stephen Brett (2)	Report	Try: Cooper Vuna, Lachlan Mitchell; Con: Danny Cipriani (2); Pen: Danny Cipriani (3)	Attendance: 10,100; Referee: Jonathon White

23 April 2011	Crusaders	18–26	Highlanders	Trafalgar Park, Nelson
19:35	Try: Zac Guildford, Adam Whitelock; Con: Matt Berquist; Pen: Matt Berquist; Drop: Matt Berquist	Report	Try: James Paterson (2) Siale Piutau; Con: Tony Brown; Pen: Tony Brown (3)	Attendance: 9,000; Referee: Bryce Lawrence

23 April 2011	Reds	19–15	Waratahs	Suncorp Stadium, Brisbane
19:40	Try: Quade Cooper 37'c Con: Quade Cooper; Pen: Quade Cooper (3); Drop: Quade Cooper 40+1'c	Report	Pen: Kurtley Beale (5)	Attendance: 35,828; Referee: Steve Walsh, replaced by Ian Smith Second half

23 April 2011	Force	26–21	Bulls	nib Stadium, Perth
20:05	Try: Cameron Shepherd; Pen: James O'Connor (6), Willie Ripia	Report	Try: Chiliboy Ralepelle, Bjorn Basson; Con: Morné Steyn; Pen: Morné Steyn (3)	Attendance: 13,780; Referee: Mark Lawrence

23 April 2011	Sharks	40–24	Hurricanes	Mr Price Kings Park, Durban
17:05	Try: John Smit, Lwazi Mvovo (2), Meyer Bosman, Ryan Kankowski; Con: Patrick Lambie (3); Pen: Patrick Lambie (3)	Report	Try: Cory Jane, Faifili Levave; Con: Daniel Kirkpatrick; Pen: Daniel Kirkpatrick (4)	Attendance: 30,899; Referee: Stuart Dickinson

23 April 2011	Lions	30–34	Chiefs	Coca-Cola Park, Johannesburg
19:10	Try: Michael Killian, Joshua Strauss, Cobus Grobbelaar; Con: Burton Francis (2), Rory Kockott; Pen: Burton Francis (3)	Report	Try: Scott Waldrom (2), Romana Graham, Toby Smith, Dwayne Sweeney; Con: Stephen Donald (3); Pen: Stephen Donald	Attendance: 10,128; Referee: Marius Jonker

Byes: Brumbies, Cheetahs, Stormers

=== Round 11 ===
29 April 2011	Highlanders	10–15	Blues	Carisbrook, Dunedin
19:35	Try: Robbie Robinson; Con: Robbie Robinson; Pen: Robbie Robinson	Report	Pen: Luke McAlister (5)	Attendance: 12,277; Referee: Chris Pollock

29 April 2011	Cheetahs	47–36	Brumbies	Free State Stadium, Bloemfontein
19:10	Try: Coenie Oosthuizen, Sarel Pretorius (2), W. P. Nel; Con: Sias Ebersohn (3); Pen: Sias Ebersohn (5); Drop: Riaan Viljoen (2)	Report	Try: Francis Fainifo, Ben Alexander, Michael Hooper, Adam Ashley-Cooper, Robbie Coleman; Con: Matt Giteau (4); Pen: Matt Giteau	Referee: Marius Jonker

30 April 2011	Hurricanes	28–26	Reds	Westpac Stadium, Wellington
19:35	Try: Faifili Levave, Aaron Cruden, Andre Taylor, Neemia Tialata; Con: Aaron Cruden; Pen: Aaron Cruden (2)	Report	Try: Scott Higginbotham, Luke Morahan (2); Con: Quade Cooper; Pen: Quade Cooper (3)	Attendance: 9,101; Referee: Keith Brown

30 April 2011	Waratahs	28–9	Rebels	Sydney Football Stadium, Sydney
19:40	Try: Tatafu Polota-Nau, Dave Dennis, Dean Mumm; Con: Kurtley Beale (2); Pen: Kurtley Beale (3)	Report	Pen: Julian Huxley (3)	Attendance: 20,120; Referee: Jonathan Kaplan

30 April 2011	Force	30–42	Crusaders	nib Stadium, Perth
20:05	Try: Cameron Shepherd (2); Con: James O'Connor; Pen: James O'Connor (5), Willie Ripia	Report	Try: Israel Dagg (2), Sonny Bill Williams, Corey Flynn, Kahn Fotuali'i; Con: Matt Berquist (4); Pen: Matt Berquist (3)	Attendance: 22,000; Referee: Vinny Munro

30 April 2011	Bulls	43–27	Chiefs	Loftus Versfeld, Pretoria
17:05	Try: Wynand Olivier (2), Gerhard van den Heever, Pierre Spies; Con: Morné Steyn (4); Pen: Morné Steyn (4); Drop: Morné Steyn	Report	Try: Mils Muliaina, Brendon Leonard, Fritz Lee; Con: Stephen Donald (3); Pen: Stephen Donald (2)	Attendance: 20,497; Referee: Craig Joubert

30 April 2011	Stormers	32–12	Sharks	DHL Newlands, Cape Town
19:10	Try: Jean de Villiers c, Gio Aplon c, Jaque Fourie m, Deon Fourie c Con: Lionel Cronjé (2), Kurt Coleman; Pen: Lionel Cronjé; Drop: Gio Aplon	Report	Pen: Patrick Lambie (4)	Attendance: 46,018; Referee: Jaco Peyper

Byes: Lions

=== Round 12 ===
6 May 2011	Hurricanes	11–17	Blues	Westpac Stadium, Wellington
19:35	Try: Hosea Gear; Pen: Aaron Cruden (2)	Report	Try: Alby Mathewson; Pen: Lachie Munro (4)	Attendance: 11,016; Referee: Jonathan Kaplan

6 May 2011	Rebels	18–33	Reds	AAMI Park, Melbourne
19:40	Try: James Hilgendorf, Afusipa Taumoepeau, Peter Betham; Pen: Julian Huxley	Report	Try: Scott Higginbotham, Radike Samo, Dom Shipperley, Digby Ioane; Con: Quade Cooper (2); Pen: Quade Cooper (3)	Attendance: 16,593

6 May 2011	Lions	19–53	Cheetahs	Coca-Cola Park, Johannesburg
19:10	Try: Joshua Strauss, Michael Rhodes, Martin Bezuidenhout; Con: Burton Francis (2)	Report	Try: Corne Uys, Riaan Viljoen (3), Robert Ebersohn; Con: Sias Ebersohn (4), Naas Olivier; Pen: Sias Ebersohn (6)	Attendance: 15,403

7 May 2011	Chiefs	20–7	Highlanders	Waikato Stadium, Hamilton
19:35	Try: Brendon Leonard, Liam Messam; Con: Stephen Donald, Dwayne Sweeney; Pen: Stephen Donald (2)	Report	Try: Jason Rutledge; Con: Robbie Robinson

7 May 2011	Waratahs	20–15	Force	Sydney Football Stadium, Sydney
19:40	Try: Ryan Cross, John Ulugia; Con: Kurtley Beale (2); Pen: Kurtley Beale (2)	Report	Pen: James O'Connor (5)	Attendance: 17,532

7 May 2011	Stormers	14–20	Crusaders	DHL Newlands, Cape Town
17:05	Try: Jaque Fourie; Pen: Lionel Cronjé (3)	Report	Try: Wyatt Crockett (2); Con: Matt Berquist (2); Pen: Matt Berquist (2)	Attendance: 48,500

7 May 2011	Sharks	34–16	Brumbies	Mr Price Kings Park, Durban
19:10	Try: JP Pietersen, Steven Sykes, Adrian Jacobs, Anton Bresler; Con: Patrick Lambie (4); Pen: Patrick Lambie (2)	Report	Try: Christian Lealiifano; Con: Matt Giteau; Pen: Matt Giteau (3)	Attendance: 21,773

Byes: Bulls

=== Round 13 ===
13 May 2011	Highlanders	13–6	Hurricanes	Rugby Park, Invercargill
19:35	Try: Ben Smith; Con: Lima Sopoaga; Pen: Lima Sopoaga (2)	Report	Pen: Aaron Cruden (2)	Attendance: 8,000; Referee: Vinny Munro

13 May 2011	Reds	37–31	Blues	Suncorp Stadium, Brisbane
17:00	Try: Quade Cooper, Saia Fainga'a, Scott Higginbotham, James Hanson; Con: Quade Cooper (4); Pen: Quade Cooper (3)	Report	Try: Chris Lowrey, Lachie Munro, Alby Mathewson, Rene Ranger; Con: Luke McAlister (4); Pen: Luke McAlister	Attendance: 30,046; Referee: Jonathan Kaplan

14 May 2011	Chiefs	30–23	Stormers	Waikato Stadium, Hamilton
19:35	Try: Penalty try, Sitiveni Sivivatu, Liam Messam; Con: Stephen Donald (3); Pen: Stephen Donald (3)	Report	Try: Gio Aplon, Schalk Burger; Con: Peter Grant (2); Pen: Peter Grant (3)	Referee: Stuart Dickinson

14 May 2011	Brumbies	20–29	Lions	Canberra Stadium, Canberra
19:40	Try: Stephen Moore, Andrew Smith; Con: Matt Giteau (2); Pen: Matt Giteau (2)	Report	Try: Michael Rhodes, Deon van Rensburg, Alwyn Hollenbach, Jaco Taute; Con: Elton Jantjies (3); Pen: Elton Jantjies	Attendance: 10,122; Referee: Nathan Pearce

14 May 2011	Bulls	47–10	Rebels	Loftus Versfeld, Pretoria
17:05	Try: Wynand Olivier (3), Zane Kirchner (2), Bjorn Basson, Fourie du Preez; Con: Morné Steyn (6)	Report	Try: Cooper Vuna; Con: Julian Huxley; Pen: Julian Huxley	Attendance: 18,833; Referee: Chris Pollock

14 May 2011	Cheetahs	33–20	Crusaders	Free State Stadium, Bloemfontein
19:10	Try: Robert Ebersohn, Sias Ebersohn, Ashley Johnson; Con: Sias Ebersohn (3); Pen: Sias Ebersohn (4)	Report	Try: Zac Guildford, Dan Carter; Con: Dan Carter (2); Pen: Dan Carter, Matthew Berquist	Referee: Bryce Lawrence

Byes: Force, Sharks, Waratahs

=== Round 14 ===
20 May 2011	Blues	26–28	Stormers	Eden Park, Auckland
19:35	Try: Alby Mathewson, Lachie Munro; Con: Luke McAlister (2); Pen: Luke McAlister (4)	Report	Try: Juan de Jongh, Johann Sadie, Schalk Burger; Con: Dewaldt Duvenage (2); Pen: Lionel Cronjé, Dewaldt Duvenage (2)	Attendance: 22,200; Referee: Keith Brown

21 May 2011	Crusaders	25–19	Chiefs	McLean Park, Napier
19:35	Try: Luke Romano; Con: Dan Carter; Pen: Dan Carter (5); Drop: Dan Carter	Report	Try: Liam Messam; Con: Stephen Donald; Pen: Stephen Donald (4)	Attendance: 14,000; Referee: Stuart Dickinson

21 May 2011	Waratahs	29–12	Lions	Sydney Football Stadium, Sydney
19:40	Try: Kurtley Beale, Sosene Anesi (2), Ryan Cross, Tom Kingston; Con: Kurtley Beale (2)	Report	Try: Jaco Taute, Dylan des Fountain; Con: Elton Jantjies	Attendance: 14,130; Referee: Marius Jonker

21 May 2011	Force	13–13	Brumbies	nib Stadium, Perth
10:05	Try: Sam Wykes; Con: James O'Connor; Pen: James O'Connor (2)	Report	Try: Henry Speight; Con: Matt Giteau; Pen: Matt Giteau (2)	Attendance: 14,477; Referee: Ian Smith

21 May 2011	Cheetahs	41–21	Rebels	Free State Stadium, Bloemfontein
17:05	Try: Corne Uys (2), Rayno Benjamin, Adriaan Strauss (2); Con: Sias Ebersohn (4), Naas Olivier; Pen: Sias Ebersohn (2)	Report	Try: Ged Robinson, Mark Gerrard, Penalty try Con: Richard Kingi (3)	Referee: Pro Legoete

21 May 2011	Sharks	23–32	Bulls	Mr Price Kings Park, Durban
19:10	Try: Bismarck du Plessis, Adrian Jacobs; Con: Patrick Lambie (2); Pen: Patrick Lambie (3)	Report	Try: Francois Hougaard, Bakkies Botha; Con: Morné Steyn (2); Pen: Morné Steyn (5); Drop: Morné Steyn	Attendance: 35,143; Referee: Bryce Lawrence

Byes: Highlanders, Hurricanes, Reds

=== Round 15 ===
27 May 2011	Hurricanes	34–28	Force	FMG Stadium, Palmerston North
19:35	Try: Ma'a Nonu (2), James Broadhurst, Cory Jane; Con: Aaron Cruden (4/4); Pen: Aaron Cruden (2)	Report	Try: Rory Sidey, Cameron Shepherd, Ben McCalman; Con: Cameron Shepherd (2/3); Pen: Cameron Shepherd (3)	Attendance: 8,408; Referee: Glen Jackson

28 May 2011	Highlanders	22–26	Lions	Carisbrook, Dunedin
19:35	Try: Shaun Treeby; Con: Lima Sopoaga (1/1); Pen: Lima Sopoaga (5)	Report	Try: Joshua Strauss, Wikus van Heerden; Con: Elton Jantjies (2/2); Pen: Elton Jantjies (4)	Attendance: 5,217; Referee: Jonathon White

28 May 2011	Brumbies	3–16	Stormers	Canberra Stadium, Canberra
19:40	Pen: Christian Lealiifano (1)		Try: Francois Louw; Con: Kurt Coleman (1/1); Pen: Kurt Coleman (2), Gio Aplon (1)	Attendance: 10,311; Referee: Marius Jonker

28 May 2011	Sharks	26–21	Waratahs	Mr Price Kings Park, Durban
17:05	Try: Patrick Lambie, JP Pietersen; Con: Patrick Lambie (2/2); Pen: Patrick Lambie (4)	Report	Try: Lachie Turner, Daniel Halangahu; Con: Daniel Halangahu (1/2); Pen: Kurtley Beale (3)	Attendance: 22,000; Referee: Jonathan Kaplan

28 May 2011	Bulls	32–21	Cheetahs	Loftus Versfeld, Pretoria
19:10	Try: Bjorn Basson, Danie Rossouw (2), Francois Hougaard; Con: Morné Steyn (3/4); Pen: Morné Steyn (2)	Report	Try: Ashley Johnson (2), Sias Ebersohn; Con: Sias Ebersohn (3)	Attendance: 36,411; Referee: Mark Lawrence

29 May 2011	Reds	17–16	Crusaders	Suncorp Stadium, Brisbane
16:10	Try: Ben Tapuai, Will Genia; Con: Quade Cooper (2/2); Pen: Quade Cooper (1/4)	Report	Try: Brent Ward; Con: Dan Carter (1/1); Pen: Dan Carter (3)	Attendance: 48,301; Referee: Stuart Dickinson

Byes: Blues, Chiefs, Rebels

=== Round 16 ===
3 June 2011	Highlanders	14–21	Force	Carisbrook, Dunedin
19:35	Try: Ben Smith; Pen: Lima Sopoaga (3)	Report	Try: David Smith (2); Con: James Stannard; Pen: James Stannard (3)	Attendance: 6,400

3 June 2011	Rebels	3–40	Stormers	AAMI Park, Melbourne
19:40	Pen: Julian Huxley	Report	Try: Bryan Habana, Kurt Coleman, Jaque Fourie, Nick Köster, Jean De Villiers; Con: Kurt Coleman (2), Earl Rose; Pen: Kurt Coleman (3)	Attendance: 15,238

3 June 2011	Bulls	23–17	Waratahs	Loftus Versfeld, Pretoria
19:10	Try: Wynand Olivier, Bjorn Basson; Con: Morné Steyn (2); Pen: Morné Steyn (3)	Report	Try: Afa Pakalani; Pen: Kurtley Beale (4)	Attendance: 23,706

4 June 2011	Hurricanes	38–27	Lions	Westpac Stadium, Wellington
17:30	Try: Hosea Gear (2), Aaron Cruden, Ma'a Nonu; Con: Aaron Cruden (3); Pen: Aaron Cruden (4)	Report	Try: Jaco Taute (2), Doppies La Grange; Con: Elton Jantjies (2), Butch James; Pen: Elton Jantjies (2)	Attendance: 8,667

4 June 2011	Blues	11–16	Chiefs	Eden Park, Auckland
19:35	Try: Jared Payne; Pen: Luke McAlister (2)	Report	Try: Tana Umaga; Con: Stephen Donald; Pen: Stephen Donald (3)	Attendance: 13,000

4 June 2011	Reds	14–22	Brumbies	Suncorp Stadium, Brisbane
19:40	Try: Ben Lucas; Pen: Quade Cooper (3)	Report	Try: Stephen Moore; Con: Matt Giteau; Pen: Matt Giteau (5)	Attendance: 27,374

4 June 2011	Cheetahs	18–23	Sharks	Free State Stadium, Bloemfontein
17:05	Try: Sarel Pretorius, Riaan Viljoen; Con: Sias Ebersohn; Pen: Sias Ebersohn (2)	Report	Try: Lwazi Mvovo, JP Pietersen; Con: Patrick Lambie (2); Pen: Patrick Lambie (3)	Attendance: 23,100

Byes: Crusaders

=== Round 17 ===
10 June 2011	Chiefs	18–18	Hurricanes	Waikato Stadium, Hamilton
19:35	Try: Richard Kahui, Isaac Ross; Con: Stephen Donald (1/2); Pen: Stephen Donald (2)	Report	Try: Andrew Hore, Hosea Gear; Con: Aaron Cruden (1/2); Pen: Aaron Cruden (2)	Referee: Steve Walsh

10 June 2011	Brumbies	32–17	Rebels	Canberra Stadium, Canberra
19:40	Try: Christian Lealiifano, Tyrone Smith, Matt Giteau, Pat McCabe, Stephen Moore; Con: Christian Lealiifano, Matt Giteau; Pen: Matt Giteau	Report	Try: Jarrod Saffy, Afusipa Taumoepeau; Con: Danny Cipriani (2); Pen: Danny Cipriani	Attendance: 11,777; Referee: Glen Jackson

11 June 2011	Crusaders	23–16	Blues	Fraser Park, Timaru
19:35	Try: Matt Todd, Zac Guildford (2); Con: Dan Carter (1/3); Pen: Dan Carter (2)	Report	Try: Rene Ranger, Charlie Faumuina; Pen: Luke McAlister (2)	Attendance: 12,000; Referee: Craig Joubert

11 June 2011	Waratahs	33–7	Highlanders	Sydney Football Stadium, Sydney
19:40	Try: Tom Carter (3), Dave Dennis, Josh Holmes; Con: Kurtley Beale (4/5)	Report	Try: Jason Rutledge; Con: Tony Brown (1/1)	Attendance: 13,474; Referee: Chris Pollock

11 June 2011	Force	21–24	Reds	nib Stadium, Perth
20:05	Try: Rory Sidey (2), David Pocock; Pen: James O'Connor (2)	Report	Try: Quade Cooper, Scott Higginbotham, Dom Shipperley; Con: Quade Cooper (3/3); Pen: Quade Cooper (1)	Attendance: 16,102; Referee: Stuart Dickinson

11 June 2011	Lions	30–30	Sharks	Coca-Cola Park, Johannesburg
16:05	Try: Cobus Grobbelaar (2), Jano Vermaak; Con: Butch James (3/3); Pen: Butch James (3)	Report	Try: Patrick Lambie, JP Pietersen, Lwazi Mvovo; Con: Patrick Lambie (3/3); Pen: Patrick Lambie (3)	Attendance: 35,846; Referee: Marius Jonker

11 June 2011	Stormers	16–19	Bulls	DHL Newlands, Cape Town
18:10	Try: Andries Bekker; Con: Dewaldt Duvenage (1/1); Pen: Kurt Coleman, Dewaldt Duvenage (2)	Report	Try: Francois Hougaard; Con: Morné Steyn (1/1); Pen: Morné Steyn (4)	Attendance: 51,900; Referee: Jonathan Kaplan

Byes: Cheetahs

=== Round 18 ===
17 June 2011	Blues	33–16	Highlanders	Eden Park, Auckland
19:35	Try: Stephen Brett, Luke McAlister, Jared Payne; Con: Lachie Munro (3/3); Pen: Lachie Munro (4)	Report	Try: Matt Saunders (2); Pen: Tony Brown (1); Drop: Tony Brown (1)	Attendance: 12,800; Referee: Bryce Lawrence

17 June 2011	Rebels	24–27	Force	AAMI Park, Melbourne
19:40	Try: Adam Freier, Stirling Mortlock; Con: Stirling Mortlock (1); Pen: Danny Cipriani (4)	Report	Try: David Smith, James Stannard; Con: Willie Ripia (1/2); Pen: James Stannard (4), Willie Ripia	Attendance: 14,861; Referee: Garratt Williamson

18 June 2011	Chiefs	11–19	Reds	Waikato Stadium, Hamilton
17:30	Try: Fritz Lee; Pen: Stephen Donald (2)	Report	Try: Liam Gill; Con: Quade Cooper (1/1); Pen: Quade Cooper (4)	Referee: Keith Brown

18 June 2011	Crusaders	16–9	Hurricanes	Westpac Stadium, Wellington
19:35	Try: Robbie Fruean; Con: Dan Carter (1/1); Pen: Dan Carter (3)	Report	Pen: Aaron Cruden (3)	Attendance: 18,453; Referee: Steve Walsh

18 June 2011	Waratahs	41–7	Brumbies	ANZ Stadium, Sydney
19:40	Try: Lachie Turner, Sitaleki Timani, Chris Alcock, Sosene Anesi, Dave Dennis; Con: Kurtley Beale (5/5); Pen: Kurtley Beale (2)	Report	Try: Francis Fainifo; Con: Matt Giteau (1/1)	Attendance: 28,276; Referee: Craig Joubert

18 June 2011	Bulls	23–26	Sharks	Loftus Versfeld, Pretoria
17:05	Try: Gerhard van den Heever, Francois Hougaard; Con: Morné Steyn (2/2); Pen: Morné Steyn (3)	Report	Try: Stefan Terblanche, Lwazi Mvovo; Con: Patrick Lambie (1/1), Frédéric Michalak (1/1); Pen: Patrick Lambie (2), Frédéric Michalak (1); Drop: Frédéric Michalak (1)	Attendance: 51,762; Referee: Jonathan Kaplan

18 June 2011	Cheetahs	34–44	Stormers	Free State Stadium, Bloemfontein
19:10	Try: Davon Raubenheimer, Rayno Benjamin (3); Con: Sias Ebersohn (4/4); Pen: Sias Ebersohn (2)	Report	Try: Gio Aplon, Juan de Jongh, Nick Köster, Bryan Habana; Con: Peter Grant (3/4); Pen: Peter Grant (6)	Referee: Marius Jonker

Byes: Lions

== Finals ==
Qualifiers
24 June – Auckland
(New Zealand) Blues	26
(Australia) Waratahs	13
25 June – Nelson
(New Zealand) Crusaders	36
(South Africa) Sharks	8

Semi-finals
2 July – Brisbane
(Australia) Reds	30
(New Zealand) Blues	13
2 July – Cape Town
(South Africa) Stormers	10
(New Zealand) Crusaders	29

Final
9 July – Brisbane
(Australia) Reds	18
(New Zealand) Crusaders	13

=== Qualifiers ===
24 June 2011
19:35 NZST (UTC+12)

Blues	26–13	Waratahs
Try: Munro 24' c Williams 63' c Con: McAlister (1/1) 25'; Munro (1/1) 65'; Pen: Munro (3/4) 34', 37', 56'; McAlister (1/1) 78'	Report	Try: Carter 18' m Turner 75' m Con: Beale (0/2); Pen: Beale (1/1) 32'

Eden Park, Auckland
Attendance: 16,100
Referee: Chris Pollock (New Zealand)

25 June 2011
19:35 NZST (UTC+12)

Crusaders	36–8	Sharks
Try: Williams 32' c Read 50' c B. Franks 78' c Con: Carter (2/2) 34', 51'; Berquist (1/1) 79'; Pen: Carter (5/7) 2', 36', 48', 58', 75'	Report	Try: Alberts 11' m Con: Lambie (0/1); Pen: Lambie (1/2) 43'

Trafalgar Park, Nelson
Attendance: 12,000
Referee: Bryce Lawrence (New Zealand)

=== Semi-finals ===
2 July 2011
19:40 AEST (UTC+10)

Reds	30–13	Blues
Try: Davies (3) 12' c, 48' m, 57' c Tapuai 30' m Con: Cooper (2/4) 13', 59'; Pen: Cooper (1/1) 38'; Drop: Cooper (1/1) 75'	Report	Try: Lowrey 41' c Con: Brett (1/1) 41'; Pen: McAlister (2/2) 46', 53'

Lang Park, Brisbane
Attendance: 44,940
Referee: Jonathan Kaplan (South Africa)

2 July 2011
17:05 SAST (UTC+02)

Stormers	10–29	Crusaders
Try: Habana 39' c Con: Grant (1/1) 40'; Pen: Grant (1/1) 7'	Report	Try: Maitland 16' c Fruean 34' c Con: Carter (2/2) 17', 36'; Pen: Carter (5/5) 14', 20', 25', 43', 65'

Newlands Stadium, Cape Town
Attendance: 48,000
Referee: Craig Joubert (South Africa)

=== Final ===
9 July 2011
19:40 AEST (UTC+10)

Reds	18–13	Crusaders
Try: Ioane 51' c Genia 68' m Con: Cooper (1/2) 51'; Pen: Cooper (2/3) 32', 38'	Report	Try: Carter 35' c Con: Carter (1/1) 36'; Pen: Carter (2/3) 49', 56'

Lang Park, Brisbane
Attendance: 52,113
Referee: Bryce Lawrence (New Zealand)

== Player statistics ==
=== Leading try scorers ===
Top 10 try scorers
Pos	Name	Tries	Team
1	Bjorn Basson	9	Bulls
1	Sean Maitland	9	Crusaders
1	Sarel Pretorius	9	Cheetahs
4	Rene Ranger	8	Blues
5	Israel Dagg	7	Crusaders
5	Jared Payne	7	Blues
7	Tom Carter	6	Waratahs
7	Jaque Fourie	6	Stormers
7	Robbie Fruean	6	Crusaders
7	Hosea Gear	6	Hurricanes
7	Scott Higginbotham	6	Reds
7	Alby Mathewson	6	Blues
7	Drew Mitchell	6	Waratahs
7	Luke Morahan	6	Reds
7	Lwazi Mvovo	6	Sharks
7	Wynand Olivier	6	Bulls
7	JP Pietersen	6	Sharks
7	Jaco Taute	6	Lions
7	Adam Thomson	6	Highlanders

Source: South African Rugby Union

=== Leading point scorers ===
Top 10 overall point scorers
Pos	Name	Points	Team
1	Quade Cooper	228	Reds
2	Morné Steyn	216	Bulls
3	Dan Carter	194	Crusaders
4	Patrick Lambie	193	Sharks
5	Sias Ebersohn	179	Cheetahs
6	Matt Giteau	171	Brumbies
7	James O'Connor	170	Force
8	Kurtley Beale	169	Waratahs
9	Peter Grant	142	Stormers
10	Luke McAlister	137	Blues

Source: South African Rugby Union

== Attendances ==
Team	Main stadium	Capacity	Total attendance	Average attendance	% capacity
(New Zealand) Blues	Eden Park	50,000	153,009	17,001	
(New Zealand) Chiefs	Waikato Stadium	25,800			
(New Zealand) Hurricanes	Westpac Stadium	34,500	72,064	10,294	34%
(New Zealand) Crusaders	Trafalgar Park	18,000	133,535	14,837	
(New Zealand) Highlanders	Carisbrook	30,000	76,544	9,568	35%
(Australia) Reds	Suncorp Stadium	52,500	332,538	33,253	63%
(Australia) Brumbies	Canberra Stadium	25,011	104,831	13,103	52%
(Australia) Waratahs	Allianz Stadium	44,000	163,947	20,493	
(Australia) Melbourne Rebels	AAMI Park	29,500	137,124	17,140	58%
(Australia) Western Force	nib Stadium	20,500	129,606	16,200	79%
(South Africa) Sharks	ABSA Stadium	52,000	222,797	27,849	53%
(South Africa) Bulls	Loftus Versfeld	51,792	250,331	31,291	60%
(South Africa) Lions	Ellis Park	62,567	172,337	21,542	34%
(South Africa) Cheetahs	Free State Stadium	46,000			
(South Africa) Stormers	Newlands Stadium	51,900	364,094	40,454	77%

== See also ==
- Super Rugby franchise areas
- List of Super Rugby records
