= 2009 Queensland Reds season =

Queensland Reds 2009 rugby season

Coordinates: 27°27′53″S 153°0′34″E

== Current squad ==
The squad for the 2009 season:

Props: Ben Daley; Dayna Edwards; Greg Holmes; Jack Kennedy; Laurie Weeks; Hookers: Saia Fainga'a; Sean Hardman; Locks: Adam Byrnes; James Horwill (c); Van Humphries; Rob Simmons	Loose forwards: Daniel Braid; Scott Higginbotham; Leroy Houston; Poutasi Luafutu; Hugh McMeniman; Ezra Taylor; Half backs: Will Genia; Ben Lucas; Fly Halves: Berrick Barnes; Quade Cooper	Centres: Blair Connor; Anthony Fainga'a; Charlie Fetoai; Morgan Turinui; Wings: Peter Hynes; Digby Ioane; Brando Va'aulu; Full backs: Rodney Davies; Mark McLinden

== Player Changes ==
=== In ===
Player	Previous Team	League
Anthony Fainga'a	(Australia) Brumbies	Super 14
Saia Fainga'a	(Australia) Brumbies	Super 14
Daniel Braid	(New Zealand) Blues	Super 14
Ezra Taylor	(New Zealand) Highlanders	Super 14
Mark McLinden	(England) Harlequins RL	Super League (Rugby league)
Rodney Davies	(Australia) Brisbane Broncos	National Rugby League (Rugby league)

=== Out ===
Player	New Team	League
Stephen Moore	(Australia) Brumbies	Super 14
Rodney Blake	(France) RC Narbonne	Rugby Pro D2
Sam Cordingley	(France) FC Grenoble	Rugby Pro D2
Clinton Schifcofske	(Republic of Ireland) Ulster	Celtic League
Chris Latham	(England) Worcester Warriors	Guinness Premiership
David Croft	Retired	N/A
John Roe	Retired	N/A

== Table ==
2009 Super 14 table
Pos	Team	Pld	W	D	L	PF	PA	PD	B	Pts	Qualification
1	(South Africa) Bulls	13	10	0	3	338	271	+67	6	46	Advanced to the playoffs
2	(New Zealand) Chiefs	13	9	0	4	338	236	+102	9	45	Advanced to the playoffs
3	(New Zealand) Hurricanes	13	9	0	4	380	279	+101	8	44	Advanced to the playoffs
4	(New Zealand) Crusaders	13	8	1	4	231	198	+33	7	41	Advanced to the playoffs
5	(Australia) Waratahs	13	9	0	4	241	212	+29	5	41	
6	(South Africa) Sharks	13	8	0	5	282	239	+43	6	38	
7	(Australia) Brumbies	13	8	0	5	311	305	+6	6	38	
8	(Australia) Western Force	13	6	1	6	328	275	+53	10	36	
9	(New Zealand) Blues	13	5	0	8	339	369	−30	12	32	
10	(South Africa) Stormers	13	5	0	8	235	249	−14	7	27	
11	(New Zealand) Highlanders	13	4	0	9	254	269	−15	10	26	
12	(South Africa) Lions	13	4	0	9	294	419	−125	9	25	
13	(Australia) Reds	13	3	0	10	258	380	−122	7	19	
14	(South Africa) Cheetahs	13	2	0	11	213	341	−128	4	12	

Updated to match(es) played on 17 May 2009. Source:

== Fixtures ==
=== Week 1 ===
19:10 2009-02-14

Bulls (South Africa)	33–20	(Australia) Reds
Tries: Fourie du Preez, Wynand Olivier, Burton Francis, Pierre Spies; Con: Morné Steyn (2); Pen: Morné Steyn (3)		Tries: Digby Ioane, Peter Hynes; Con: Berrick Barnes (1), Quade Cooper (1); Pen: Ben Lucas (1); DG: Berrick Barnes (1)

Loftus Versfeld, Pretoria
Attendance: ?????????
Referee: (South Africa) Marius Jonker

=== Week 2 ===
19:10 2009-02-20

Stormers (South Africa)	27–24	(Australia) Reds
Tries: Andries Bekker, Tonderai Chavanga, Sireli Naqelevuki; Con: Peter Grant (3); Pen: Peter Grant (2)		Tries: Quade Cooper, Anthony Fainga'a, Scott Higginbotham, Van Humphries; Con: Ben Lucas (2); Pen:

Newlands Stadium, Cape Town
Attendance: 33022
Referee: (New Zealand) Chris Pollock

=== Week 3 ===
- No D/L Savings in Brisbane

16:00 2009-03-01

Reds (Australia)	22–3	(South Africa) Cheetahs
Tries: Mark McLinden, Digby Ioane, Peter Hynes; Con: Ben Lucas (1), Berrick Barnes (1); Pen: Ben Lucas (1)		Tries: Con: Pen: Jacques Louis Potgieter (1)

Suncorp Stadium, Brisbane
Attendance: 16,295
Referee: (Australia) Ian Smith

=== Week 4 ===
19:40 2009-03-06

Waratahs (Australia)	15–11	(Australia) Reds
Tries: Benn Robinson, Timana Tahu; Con:Kurtley Beale (1); Pen: Kurtley Beale (1)		Tries:Peter Hynes; Con: Pen:Ben Lucas (2)

Sydney Football Stadium, Sydney
Attendance: 28,109
Referee: (New Zealand) Bryce Lawrence

=== Week 5 ===
- No D/L Savings in Brisbane

19:05 2009-03-14

Reds (Australia)	25–13	(South Africa) Sharks
Tries: Adam Byrnes, Will Genia, Digby Ioane; Con: Berrick Barnes (2); Pen: Ben Lucas (1), Berrick Barnes (1)		Tries: Ryan Kankowski; Con: Rory Kockott (1); Pen: Rory Kockott (2)

Suncorp Stadium, Brisbane
Attendance: 20,582
Referee: (Australia) James Leckie

=== Week 6 ===
Bye
(Australia) Reds	(South Africa) Stormers

=== Week 7 ===
- No D/L Savings in Brisbane, Sunday 29 March D/L Savings ends in Perth.

19:05 2009-03-28

Reds (Australia)	26–50	(New Zealand) Chiefs
Tries: Con: Pen:		Tries: Con: Pen:

Suncorp Stadium, Brisbane

=== Week 8 ===
- Sunday, 5 April D/L Savings Ends in Australia and New Zealand.

19:05 2009-04-03

Western Force (Australia)	39–7	(Australia) Reds
Tries: Con: Pen:		Tries: Con: Pen:

Subiaco Oval, Perth

=== Week 9 ===
- Easter Weekend

17:30 2009-04-11

Highlanders (New Zealand)	24–19	(Australia) Reds
Tries: Con: Pen:		Tries: Con: Pen:

Rugby Park, Invercargill

=== Week 10 ===
17:35 2009-04-18

Reds (Australia)	20–31	(South Africa) Lions
Tries: Con: Pen:		Tries: Con: Pen:

Suncorp Stadium, Brisbane

=== Week 11 ===
17:30 2009-04-25

Blues (New Zealand)	24–31	(Australia) Reds
Tries: Con: Pen:		Tries: Con: Pen:

North Harbour Stadium, North Shore City

=== Week 12 ===
2 May 2009
19:40

Reds (Australia)	13–52	(Australia) Brumbies
Tries: Will Genia (2); Pen: Quade Cooper		Tries: Gene Fairbanks, Stephen Hoiles (2), Peter Kimlin, Ben Alexander, Adam Ashley-Cooper, Francis Fainifo; Con: Stirling Mortlock (7); Pen: Stirling Mortlock

Suncorp Stadium, Brisbane
Attendance: 19,346
Referee: Ian Smith (Australia)

=== Week 13 ===
19:35 2009-05-08

Crusaders (New Zealand)	32–12	(Australia) Reds
Tries: Thomas Waldrom, Owen Franks, Tim Bateman, Jason Macdonald, Sean Maitland; Con:Leon MacDonald (2); Pen:Leon MacDonald		Tries:Ben Tapuai, Greg Holmes; Con:Quade Cooper br />Cards: Quade Cooper 33' to 43'

AMI Stadium, Christchurch
Referee: Chris Pollock (New Zealand)

=== Week 14 ===
19:40 2009-05-16

Reds (Australia)	28–37	(New Zealand) Hurricanes
Tries: Con: Pen:		Tries: Con: Pen:

Suncorp Stadium, Brisbane

== Statistics ==
=== Leading Try Scorers ===
Top 5

Top 10 try scorers
Pos	Name	Tries	Pld
=1	Digby Ioane	2	3
=1	Peter Hynes	2	3
=3	Scott Higginbotham	1	3
=3	Van Humphries	1	3
=3	Quade Cooper	1	3

=== Leading Points Scorers ===
Top 5
