= Colby Fainga'a =

Australian rugby union player

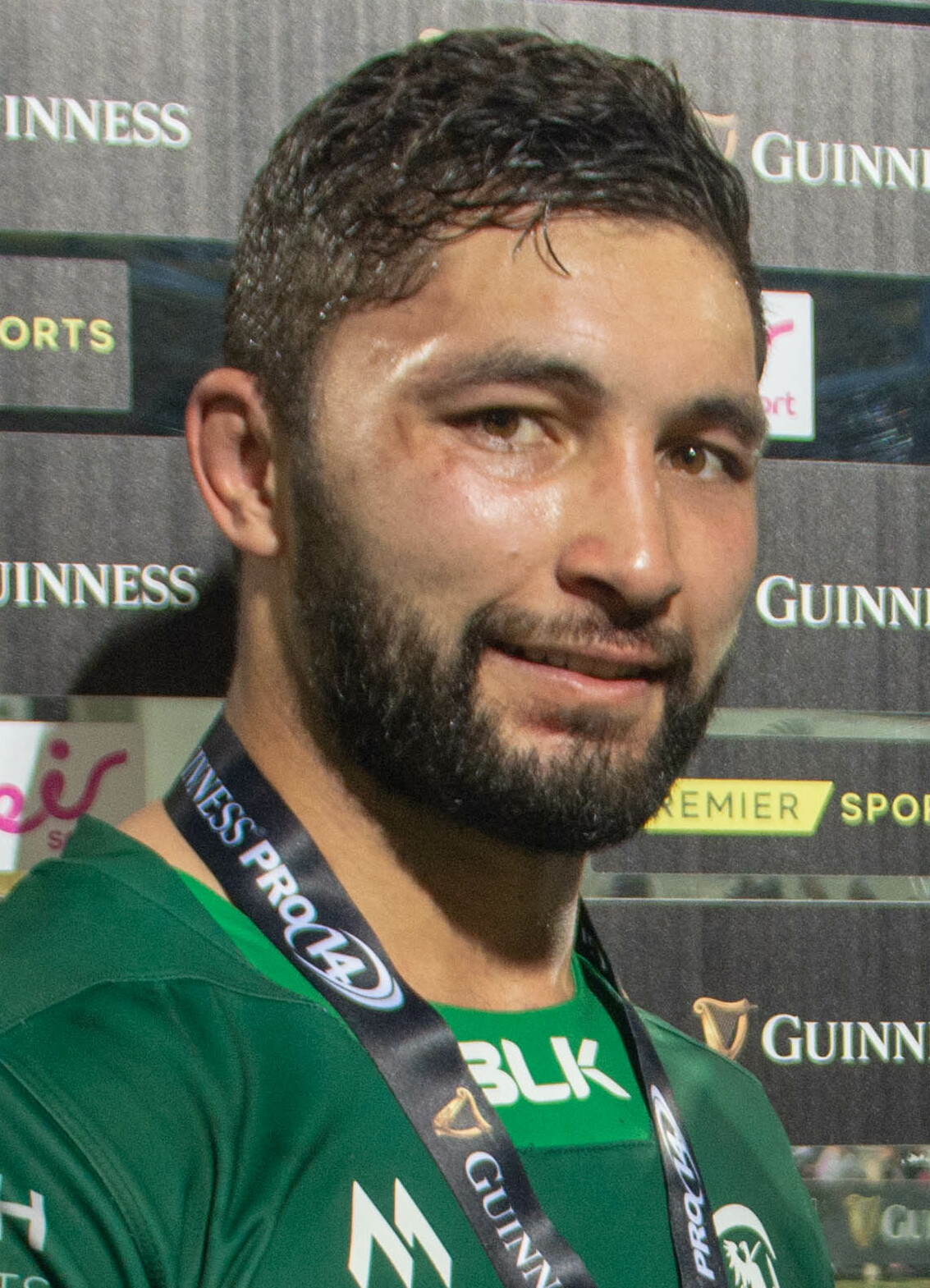
- Fainga'a in 2019
- Born: Colby Fainga'a; 31 March 1991 (age 35) Queanbeyan, New South Wales, Australia
- Height: 1.83 m (6 ft 0 in)
- Weight: 101 kg (15 st 13 lb)
- School: St Edmund's College
- Notable relative(s): Anthony Fainga'a (brother); Saia Fainga'a (brother); Vili Faingaʻa (brother)

Rugby union career
- Position(s): Flanker, Number 8
- Current team: Kyuden Voltex
Senior career
Years	Team	Apps	(Points)
2018–2020	Connacht	35	(10)
2020–2022	Lyon	13	(10)
2022–	Kyuden Voltex	46	(70)
- Correct as of 14 January 2021
Provincial / State sides
Years	Team	Apps	(Points)
2015−2016	Melbourne Rising	10	(25)
- Correct as of 15 October 2016
Super Rugby
Years	Team	Apps	(Points)
2010–2013	Brumbies	35	(5)
2014–2018	Melbourne Rebels	66	(20)
- Correct as of 14 July 2018
International career
Years	Team	Apps	(Points)
2008	Australia Schoolboys	1	(0)
2010–2011	Australia U20	7	(10)
- Correct as of 26 June 2011

Colby Fainga'a (born 31 March 1991) is an Australian professional rugby union player who plays for Lyon in the Top 14.

== Career ==
=== ACT Brumbies ===
Fainga'a made his Super Rugby debut for the Brumbies in 2010 against the Chiefs in Canberra.

=== Melbourne Rebels ===
In April 2013, he signed with the Rebels for the 2014 Super Rugby season. On 7 August 2015, Fainga'a, along with Scott Fuglistaller were appointed co-captains of Melbourne Rising for the 2015 National Rugby Championship season.

=== Connacht ===
On 11 July 2018, Connacht announced the signing of Fainga'a, it was stated he would join up with the squad on the conclusion of the current Rebels Super Rugby season. Connacht Head Coach Andy Friend had previously coached him at former club Brumbies when he signed his first professional contract with the club.

=== Lyon ===
In 2020, Fainga'a would travel to France to join Lyon in the Top 14 from the 2020–21 season.

== Personal life ==
He is the younger brother of twins Saia & Anthony Fainga'a and also Vili Fainga'a.

== Super Rugby statistics ==
As of 15 July 2018

Season	Team	Games	Starts	Sub	Mins	Tries	Cons	Pens	Drops	Points	Yel	Red
2010	Brumbies	6	2	4	212	0	0	0	0	0	0	0
2011	Brumbies	12	7	5	630	0	0	0	0	0	0	0
2012	Brumbies	1	0	1	10	0	0	0	0	0	0	0
2013	Brumbies	16	4	12	425	1	0	0	0	5	0	0
2014	Rebels	15	12	3	987	1	0	0	0	5	0	0
2015	Rebels	16	7	9	669	1	0	0	0	5	0	0
2016	Rebels	9	6	3	509	1	0	0	0	0	0	0
2017	Rebels	12	11	1	857	1	0	0	0	5	2	0
2018	Rebels	14	8	6	748	0	0	0	0	0	0	0
Total		100	57	43	5049	5	0	0	0	25	2	0
