= Laurie Weeks (rugby union) =

Australia international rugby union player

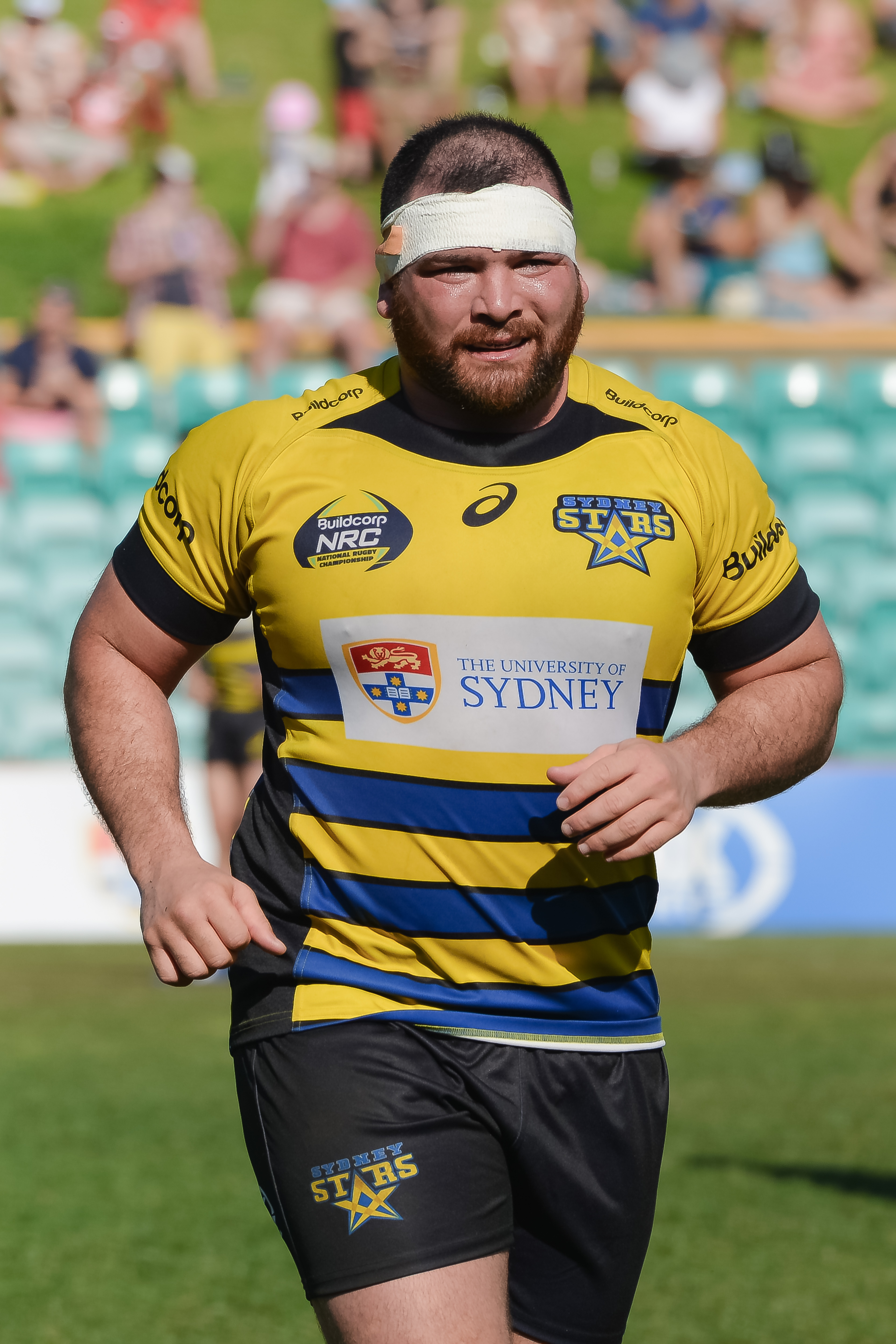
- Weeks playing for Sydney Stars NRC Round 7
- Born: 5 April 1986 (age 40) Sydney, New South Wales, Australia
- Height: 1.84 m (6 ft 1/2 in)
- Weight: 115 kg (18 st 2 lb)
- School: St. Joseph's College, Hunters Hill
- University: Sydney University

Rugby union career
- Position: Tighthead Prop
- Current team: Sydney University
Senior career
Years	Team	Apps	(Points)
2007	Sydney Fleet	1	(5)
2014	Sydney Stars	5	(5)
2018	Melbourne Rising	3	(0)
- Correct as of 27 January 2019
Super Rugby
Years	Team	Apps	(Points)
2009–10	Reds	23	(5)
2011–2018	Rebels	85	(0)
- Correct as of 5 November 2017
International career
Years	Team	Apps	(Points)
2014	Australia	2	(0)
- Correct as of 22 June 2014

Laurie Weeks (born 5 April 1986, Sydney, Australia) is a former professional and national representative rugby union footballer. He played at tighthead prop for the Melbourne Rebels. On 17 March 2017, in a game against the Chiefs, Weeks became the Rebels most capped player.

== Super Rugby ==
Weeks made his Super Rugby debut for the Reds in February 2009 against the Bulls. The Rugby Union Players Association (RUPA) named Weeks 'Newcomer of the Year' for the 2009 season; Weeks played 23 games for the Reds 2009-2010. In 2011, Weeks left Queensland and moved to Victoria to join the Melbourne Rebels.

In 2012, his Rebel teammates included props Nic Henderson, Rodney Blake, 20-year-old Paul Alo-Emile, and new signings Kurtley Beale (fullback) and James O'Connor (inside centre).

Laurie weeks now works as the ticketing and marketing manager at the Melbourne Rebels and has ensured the existence of the Super Rugby franchise for at least another 2 years.

== Super Rugby statistics ==
As of 15 July 2018

Season	Team	Games	Starts	Sub	Mins	Tries	Cons	Pens	Drops	Points	Yel	Red
2009	Reds	13	11	2	812	0	0	0	0	0	0	0
2010	Reds	10	10	0	684	1	0	0	0	5	0	0
2011	Rebels	16	5	11	575	0	0	0	0	0	0	0
2012	Rebels	5	5	0	333	0	0	0	0	0	0	0
2013	Rebels	16	13	3	930	0	0	0	0	0	1	0
2014	Rebels	14	13	1	732	0	0	0	0	0	0	0
2015	Rebels	9	7	2	312	0	0	0	0	0	0	1
2016	Rebels	11	10	1	638	0	0	0	0	0	0	0
2017	Rebels	14	9	5	631	0	0	0	0	0	0	0
2018	Rebels	0	0	0	0	0	0	0	0	0	0	0
Total		108	83	25	5627	1	0	0	0	5	1	1
