= List of Super Rugby records =

Super Rugby is a rugby union competition, which began in 1996, following a deal with SANZAR and News Limited. It is also known by its previous names Super 12 and Super 14.

== Match records ==
=== Team ===
==== Most points ====
- Super 12 era: 96, Crusaders (vs Waratahs (11 May 2002))
- Super 14 era: 92, Bulls (vs Reds (5 May 2007))
- Super Rugby (15) era: 72, Waratahs (vs Kings (4 May 2013))
- Super Rugby (18) era: 94, Lions (vs Sunwolves (1 July 2017))
- Super Rugby regional comps era: 64, Hurricanes (vs Waratahs (14 May 2021)
- Super Rugby Pacific (11/12) era: 85, Chiefs (vs Moana Pasifika (24 May 2025)

==== Greatest aggregate ====
- Super 12 era: 118, Sharks 75–43 Highlanders (8 March 1997)
- Super 14 era: 137, Lions 65–72 Chiefs (19 February 2010)
- Super Rugby (15) era: 103, Blues 40–63 Sharks (31 March 2018)
- Super Rugby (18) era: 111, Crusaders 85–26 Rebels (9 July 2016)
- Super Rugby regional comps era: 112, Waratahs 48–64 Hurricanes (14 May 2021)
- Super Rugby Pacific (11/12) era: 99, Blues 71–28 Rebels (6 May 2022)

==== Lowest aggregate ====
- Super 12 era: 11, Reds 11–0 Hurricanes (27 February 1999), Sharks 5–6 Reds (24 April 2004)
- Super 14 era: 6, Highlanders 6–0 Crusaders (7 March 2009)
- Super Rugby (15) era: 16, Stormers 16–0 Bulls (5 July 2014)
- Super Rugby (18) era: 18, Sharks 9–9 Rebels (22 April 2017)
- Super Rugby regional comps era: 17, Force 7–10 Rebels (12 March 2021)
- Super Rugby Pacific (11/12) era: 13, Highlanders 7–6 Force (27 April 2024)

==== Largest winning margin ====
- Super 12 era: 77, Crusaders 96–19 Waratahs (11 May 2002)
- Super 14 era: 89, Bulls 92–3 Reds (5 May 2007)
- Super Rugby (15) era: 66, Crusaders 66–0 Rebels (8 June 2019)
- Super Rugby (18) era: 87, Lions 94–7 Sunwolves (1 July 2017)
- Super Rugby regional comps era: 52, Force 5–57 Reds (21 August 2020)
- Super Rugby Pacific (11/12) era: 78, Chiefs 85–7 Moana Pasifika (24 May 2025)

==== Most tries combined ====
- Super 12 era: 17, Crusaders vs Waratahs (11 May 2002)
- Super 14 era: 18, Lions vs Chiefs (19 February 2010)
- Super Rugby (15) era: 14, Cheetahs vs Waratahs (6 June 2015)
- Super Rugby (18) era: 17, Crusaders vs Rebels (9 July 2016)
- Super Rugby regionalised comps era: 17, Waratahs vs Hurricanes (14 May 2021)
- Super Rugby Pacific (11/12) era: 15, Blues vs Rebels (6 May 2022), Crusaders vs Drua (3 April 2026)

==== Most tries per team ====
- Super 12 era: 14, Crusaders (vs Waratahs (11 May 2002))
- Super Rugby (18) era: 14, Cheetahs (vs Sunwolves (15 April 2016)), Lions (vs Sunwolves (1 July 2017))
- Super Rugby regionalised comps era: 10, Hurricanes (vs Waratahs (14 May 2021))
- Super Rugby Pacific (11/12) era: 13, Chiefs (vs Moana Pasifika (24 May 2025)

=== Individual ===
==== Most points in a match ====
1. 50, Gavin Lawless (Sharks vs Highlanders (8 March 1997))
2. 38, Robert du Preez (Sharks vs Blues (31 March 2018))
3. 36, Hayden Parker (Sunwolves vs Reds (12 May 2018))
4. 35, Morné Steyn (Bulls vs Brumbies (20 February 2010))

==== Most tries in a match ====
1. 5,Sean Wainui, Chiefs (vs Waratahs (12 June 2021)) &
  Macca Springer, Crusaders (vs Force (15 March 2025))
2. 4, occurred on 24 occasions

==== Most conversions in a match ====
1. 13, Andrew Mehrtens (Crusaders vs Waratahs (11 May 2002))
2. 11, Derick Hougaard (Bulls vs Reds (5 May 2007))
3. 9, occurred on 3 occasions

==== Most penalties in a match ====
1. 9, Elton Jantjies (Lions vs Cheetahs (25 February 2012))
2. 8, occurred on 5 occasions

== Season records ==
N.B.: Team records are for the regular season, individual records include finals.

=== Team ===
==== Most points ====
- Super 12 era: 469, Crusaders (2002)
- Super 14 era: 436, Bulls (2010)
- Super Rugby (15) era: 489, Hurricanes (2012)
- Super Rugby (18) era: 596, Hurricanes (2017)
- Super Rugby regionalised comps era: 271, Reds (2021 AU)
- Super Rugby Pacific (11/12) era: 562, Hurricanes (2026)

==== Most points against ====
- Super 12 era: 500, Bulls (2002)
- Super 14 era: 585, Lions (2010)
- Super Rugby (15) era: 570, Rebels (2011)
- Super Rugby (18) era: 684, Southern Kings (2016)
- Super Rugby regional comps era: 292, Waratahs (2021 AU)
- Super Rugby Pacific (11/12) era: 610, Moana Pasifika (2023)

==== Fewest points for ====
- Super 12 era: 185, Reds (2005)
- Super 14 era: 175, Lions (2007)
- Super Rugby (15) era: 245, Force (2015)
- Super Rugby (18) era: 236, Rebels (2017)
- Super Rugby regional comps era: 82, Brumbies (2021 TT), Force (2021 TT)
- Super Rugby Pacific (11/12) era: 261, Drua (2022)

==== Fewest points against ====
- Super 12 era: 170, Reds (1999)
- Super 14 era: 171, Stormers (2010)
- Super Rugby (15) era: 252, Waratahs (2011)
- Super Rugby (18) era: 268, Lions (2017)
- Super Rugby regional comps era: 79 Blues (2021 TT)
- Super Rugby Pacific (11/12) era: 233 Blues (2024)

==== Best points difference ====
- Super 12 era: 234, Crusaders, (2002)
- Super 14 era: 202, Crusaders, (2006)
- Super Rugby (15) era: 209, Waratahs, (2014)
- Super Rugby (18) era: 324, Hurricanes, (2017)
- Super Rugby regional comps era: 119, Blues, (2021 TT)
- Super Rugby Pacific (11/12) era: 264, Hurricanes, (2026)

==== Worst points difference ====
- Super 12 era: −268, Bulls (2002)
- Super 14 era: −315, Lions (2010)
- Super Rugby (15) era: −289, Rebels (2011)
- Super Rugby (18) era: −402, Southern Kings (2016)
- Super Rugby regional comps era: −154, Waratahs (2021 AU)
- Super Rugby Pacific (11/12) era: −291, Moana Pasifika (2026)

==== Most competition points ====
- Super 12 era: 51, Crusaders (2002)
- Super 14 era: 52, Crusaders (2008)
- Super Rugby (15) era: 66, Reds* (2011), Stormers* (2012), Chiefs* (2013), Hurricanes (2015)
- Super Rugby (18) era: 65, Lions (2017)
- Super Rugby regional comps: 33, Reds (2021 AU)
- Super Rugby Pacific (11/12) era: 59, Chiefs (2023)

*(Note: Prior to 2014, teams received 4 points per bye)

==== Fewest competition points ====
- Super 12 era: 0, Bulls (2002)
- Super 14 era: 1, Lions (2010)
- Super Rugby (15) era: 16 Rebels (2011), Southern Kings (2013)
- Super Rugby (18) era: 9, Southern Kings, Sunwolves (2016), Rebels (2017)
- Super Rugby regional comps era: 0, Rebels, Waratahs (2021 TT)
- Super Rugby Pacific (11/12) era: 8, Moana Pasifika (2023)

*(Note: Prior to 2014, teams received 4 points per bye)

==== Most wins ====
- Super 12 era: 11, Crusaders (2002)
- Super 14 era: 11, Crusaders (2006, 2008)
- Super Rugby (15) era: 14, Stormers (2012), Hurricanes (2015)
- Super Rugby (18) era: 14, Lions, Crusaders (2017)
- Super Rugby regional comps era: 7, Reds (2021 AU)
- Super Rugby Pacific (11/12) era: 13, Blues (2022), Chiefs (2023)

==== Most defeats ====
- Super 12 era: 11, Bulls (2002)
- Super 14 era: 13, Lions (2010)
- Super Rugby (15) era: 13, Rebels (2011) and Highlanders (2013)
- Super Rugby (18) era: 13, Force, Southern Kings, Sunwolves (2016), Rebels (2017)
- Super Rugby regional comps era: 8, Waratahs (2021 AU)
- Super Rugby Pacific (11/12) era: 13, Moana Pasifika (2023)

==== Most tries ====
- Super 12 era: 71, Crusaders (2005)
- Super 14 era: 53, Crusaders (2006, 2008)
- Super Rugby (15) era: 63, Highlanders (2015)
- Super Rugby (18) era: 89, Hurricanes (2017)
- Super Rugby regional comps era: 37 Brumbies (2021 AU)
- Super Rugby Pacific (11/12) era: 86 Hurricanes (2026)

==== Fewest tries ====
- Super 12 era: 20, Sharks (2002)
- Super 14 era: 13, Lions (2007)
- Super Rugby (15) era: 25, Force (2011)
- Super Rugby (18) era: 23, Rebels (2017)
- Super Rugby regional comps era: 11, Force (2021 TT)
- Super Rugby Pacific (11/12) era: 30, Drua (2022)

=== Individual ===
==== Most points in a season ====
1. 263, Morné Steyn (Bulls) (2010)
2. 252, Bernard Foley (Waratahs) (2014)
3. 251, Aaron Cruden (Chiefs) (2012)
4. 248, Morné Steyn (Bulls) (2013)

==== Most tries in a season ====
1. 17, Fehi Fineanganofo (Hurricanes) (2026) &
  Josh Moorby (Hurricanes) (2026)
2. 16, Joe Roff (Brumbies) (1997) &
  Ben Lam (Hurricanes) (2018)
3. 15, occurred on three occasions

==== Most conversions in a season ====
1. 68, Bernard Foley (Waratahs) (2018)
2. 57, Richie Mo'unga (Crusaders) (2023)
3. 54, Elton Jantjies (Lions) (2017)

==== Most penalty goals in a season ====
1. 58, Christian Leali'ifano (Brumbies) (2013)
2. 46, Colin Slade (Crusaders) (2014)
3. 44, Bernard Foley (Waratahs) (2014)

== Career records ==
As of 20 June 2026
Bold indicates players taking part in the 2026 Super Rugby Pacific season.

=== Most games ===
Rank	Player	Games	First	Last	Club(s)
1	(Australia) **James Slipper**	212	2010	2026	Reds (104), Brumbies (108)
2	(New Zealand) Wyatt Crockett	202	2006	2018	Crusaders
3	(Australia) **Kurtley Beale**	187	2007	2026	Waratahs (148), Rebels (14) Force (25)
4	(New Zealand) Aaron Smith	185	2011	2023	Highlanders
5	(New Zealand) Liam Messam	182	2006	2021	Chiefs
6	(New Zealand) Sam Whitelock	181	2009	2023	Crusaders
7	(New Zealand) **Beauden Barrett**	180	2011	2026	Hurricanes (125), Blues (55)
7	(Australia) (Samoa) Christian Leali'ifano	180	2008	2024	Brumbies (150), Moana Pasifika (30)
9	(New Zealand) Owen Franks	179	2009	2024	Crusaders (163), Hurricanes (16)
10	(New Zealand) **Angus Taʻavao**	178	2012	2026	Blues (82), Waratahs (23), Chiefs (62), Highlanders (12)

=== Most points ===
Rank	Player	Points	First	Last	Club(s)
1	(New Zealand) Dan Carter	1,708	2003	2015	Crusaders
2	(New Zealand) **Beauden Barrett**	1,630	2011	2026	Hurricanes, Blues
3	(New Zealand) **Damian McKenzie**	1,591	2015	2026	Chiefs
4	(South Africa) Morné Steyn	1,550	2005	2020	Bulls
5	(New Zealand) Richie Mo'unga	1,227	2016	2023	Crusaders
6	(South Africa) Elton Jantjies	1,187	2011	2020	Lions, Stormers
7	(Australia) (Samoa) Christian Leali'ifano	1,104	2007	2024	Brumbies, Moana Pasifika
8	(Australia) Bernard Foley	1,095	2011	2019	Waratahs
9	(Australia) Stirling Mortlock	1,036	1998	2012	Brumbies, Rebels
10	(New Zealand) Andrew Mehrtens	990	1996	2005	Crusaders

=== Most tries ===
Rank	Player	Tries	First	Last	Club(s)
1	(New Zealand) **Sevu Reece**	74	2019	2026	Crusaders
2	(New Zealand) TJ Perenara	65	2012	2024	Hurricanes
3	(New Zealand) **Julian Savea**	63	2011	2026	Hurricanes, Moana Pasifika
4	(Australia) (Tonga) Israel Folau	60	2013	2019	Waratahs
5	(New Zealand) Doug Howlett	59	1997	2007	Highlanders, Hurricanes, Blues
6	(New Zealand) Caleb Ralph	58	1997	2011	Chiefs, Blues, Crusaders, Reds
7	(Australia) Joe Roff	57	1996	2004	Brumbies
8	(New Zealand) Christian Cullen	56	1996	2003	Hurricanes
8	(South Africa) Bryan Habana	56	2005	2013	Bulls, Stormers
8	(Australia) Stirling Mortlock	56	1998	2012	Brumbies, Rebels
8	(New Zealand) Ma'a Nonu	56	2003	2019	Hurricanes, Blues, Highlanders

=== Most conversions ===
Rank	Player	Conversions	First	Last	Club(s)
1	(New Zealand) **Beauden Barrett**	363	2011	2026	Hurricanes, Blues
2	(New Zealand) **Damian McKenzie**	358	2015	2026	Chiefs
3	(New Zealand) Richie Mo'unga	319	2016	2023	Crusaders
4	(New Zealand) Dan Carter	287	2003	2015	Crusaders
5	(South Africa) Elton Jantjies	282	2011	2020	Lions, Stormers
6	(South Africa) Morné Steyn	250	2005	2020	Bulls
7	(Australia) Bernard Foley	244	2011	2019	Waratahs
8	(Australia) (Samoa) Christian Leali'ifano	232	2008	2024	Brumbies, Moana Pasifika
9	(New Zealand) **Jordie Barrett**	196	2017	2026	Hurricanes
10	(Australia) Quade Cooper	177	2007	2019	Reds, Rebels

=== Most penalties ===
Rank	Player	Penalties	First	Last	Club(s)
1	(New Zealand) Dan Carter	307	2003	2015	Crusaders
2	(South Africa) Morné Steyn	294	2005	2020	Bulls
3	(New Zealand) **Beauden Barrett**	220	2011	2026	Hurricanes, Blues
4	(New Zealand) **Damian McKenzie**	214	2015	2026	Chiefs
5	(South Africa) Peter Grant	211	2006	2017	Stormers, Force
6	(New Zealand) Andrew Mehrtens	202	1996	2005	Crusaders
7	(New Zealand) Tony Brown	199	1996	2011	Highlanders, Sharks, Stormers
8	(South Africa) Elton Jantjies	180	2011	2020	Lions, Stormers
9	(Australia) James O'Connor	178	2008	2025	Force, Rebels, Reds, Crusaders
10	(Australia) Matt Burke	173	1996	2004	Waratahs
10	(Australia) (Samoa) Christian Leali'ifano	173	2008	2024	Brumbies, Moana Pasifika

=== Most drop goals ===
Rank	Player	Drop Goals	First	Last	Club(s)
1	(South Africa) Morné Steyn	26	2005	2020	Bulls
2	(New Zealand) Andrew Mehrtens	17	1996	2005	Crusaders
3	(South Africa) André Pretorius	13	2002	2011	Lions
4	(New Zealand) Dan Carter	11	2003	2015	Crusaders
4	(South Africa) Louis Koen	11	1996	2003	Stormers, Lions, Bulls
6	(South Africa) Derick Hougaard	10	2003	2008	Bulls
7	(Australia) Berrick Barnes	9	2006	2013	Reds, Waratahs
8	(South Africa) Marnitz Boshoff	8	2014	2018	Lions, Bulls
8	(New Zealand) Tony Brown	8	1996	2011	Highlanders, Sharks, Stormers
8	(South Africa) François Steyn	8	2007	2020	Sharks, Cheetahs
