= Sias Ebersohn =

South African rugby union player

- Full name: Josias Mathiem Ebersohn
- Born: 23 February 1989 (age 37) Bloemfontein, South Africa
- Height: 1.76 m (5 ft 9 1/2 in)
- Weight: 83 kg (13 st 1 lb; 183 lb)
- School: Grey College, Bloemfontein
- University: University of the Free State
- Notable relative: Robert Ebersohn (twin brother)

Rugby union career
- Position: Fly-half
Senior career
Years	Team	Apps	(Points)
2008–2012	Free State Cheetahs	56	(199)
2010	Cheetahs XV	1	(0)
2010–2012	Cheetahs	30	(220)
2013–2015	Force	43	(212)
2015–2016	Free State Cheetahs	11	(36)
2016	Cheetahs	1	(0)
2016	Free State XV	10	(75)
2017	Pumas	13	(36)
2008–2017	Total	165	(778)
- Correct as of 31 December 2017
International career
Years	Team	Apps	(Points)
2008–2009	South Africa Under-20	6	(70)
- Correct as of 26 June 2015

Josias Mathiem Ebersohn (born 23 February 1989) is a former South African rugby union professional player that usually played as a fly-half. He most recently played for the Pumas in the South African domestic Currie Cup competition.

He played domestic South African rugby for the Free State Cheetahs between 2008 and 2012 and also played Super Rugby for the Cheetahs between 2010 and 2012. In 2013, he moved to Perth to join the Force, where he played between 2013 and 2015 before returning to Bloemfontein for the 2015 Currie Cup Premier Division.

He also represented the South Africa U20 side in 2008 and 2009.

He retired after the 2017 season to become a farmer in the Hartswater area.

== Personal ==
Sias and twin brother Robert are the sons of Tiaan Ebersohn, a centre who played for the Free State and Western Province. They were born and raised in Bloemfontein, South Africa and schooled at Grey College. Here they climbed the ranks and eventually represented the Free State schools team at the national Under-18 Craven Week. They were chosen to represent the South Africa Under-20 team at the 2008 and 2009 IRB Junior World Championships.

Both players were quickly grabbed into the Free State Cheetahs rugby squad.

They considered themselves a package deal, as they've been playing side-by-side from school level.

== Squads ==
Sias Ebersohn was involved in the following squads:

- 2013–2015
  - Western Force (Super Rugby)
- 2011–2012
  - Toyota Free State Cheetahs (Currie Cup)
  - Cheetahs (Super Rugby)
- 2010
  - Cheetahs (Super 14)
  - Vodacom Free State Cheetahs (Currie Cup)
  - Vodacom Free State Cheetahs (Vodacom Cup)
  - Vodacom Free State Cheetahs (ABSA Under 21 Competition)
- 2009
  - Vodacom Free State Cheetahs (Currie Cup)
  - South Africa (IRB Junior World Championship) – Captain
  - Vodacom Free State Cheetahs (ABSA Under 21 Competition)
  - Vodacom Free State Cheetahs (Vodacom Cup)
- 2008
  - South Africa (IRB Junior World Championship)
  - Vodacom Free State Cheetahs (ABSA Under 21 Competition)
  - Vodacom Free State Cheetahs (Currie Cup)
  - Vodacom Free State Cheetahs (Vodacom Cup)
  - Shimlas (FNB Varsity Cup)
- 2007
  - SA Schools (SA Schools)
  - Free State (U18 Coca-Cola Craven Week)
- 2006
  - Free State (U18 Coca-Cola Craven Week)
- 2005
  - Free State (U16 Coca-Cola Grant Khomo Week)

== Super Rugby Statistics ==
As of 7 January 2015

Season	Team	Games	Starts	Sub	Mins	Tries	Cons	Pens	Drops	Points	Yel	Red
2010	Cheetahs	3	1	2	97	0	0	0	0	0	0	0
2011	Cheetahs	15	13	2	990	2	32	33	2	179	0	0
2012	Cheetahs	13	3	10	427	0	4	11	0	41	0	0
2013	Force	14	11	3	825	1	5	14	2	63	0	0
2014	Force	15	12	3	892	1	17	25	1	117	0	0
2015	Force	14	11	3	748	0	4	8	0	32	0	0
Total		74	51	23	3979	4	62	91	5	432	0	0
