= Ben Daley =

- Born: Benjamin Daley; 27 June 1988 (age 38) Sydney
- Height: 1.84 m (6 ft 1/2 in)
- Weight: 116 kg (18 st 4 lb)
- School: All Saints Anglican School
- Notable relative(s): Phil Daley (father); Doug Daley (grandfather)
- Occupation: Wolf Pack Leader

Rugby union career
- Position: Prop
Amateur team(s)
Years	Team	Apps	(Points)
2008–2012	Gold Coast Breakers		
2013–2016	Bond University		
Senior career
Years	Team	Apps	(Points)
2016	Queensland Country	6	(0)
Super Rugby
Years	Team	Apps	(Points)
2008–2016	Reds	82	(10)
2017	Force	8	(5)
2018–2019	Rebels	7	(0)
- Correct as of 16 June 2019
International career
Years	Team	Apps	(Points)
2010	Wallabies	3	(0)
2007–2008	Australia U-20	12	
2006	Australia U-19	6	
2005	Australia Schoolboys	7	

Ben Daley (born 27 June 1988) is a former national representative ’Wallabies’ rugby union footballer who played professionally for the Melbourne Rebels. Daley also previously played for the Queensland Reds and Western Force. His playing position was prop. Daley now works as Head of Legal, Compliance and Venue Operations at the St Kilda Football Club.

== Rugby career ==
In 2008 Daley joined the Queensland Reds as a rookie and in the same year played for the Australia U20 side. He was selected for the 2009 squad and was selected as run on LH prop in 12 of the 13 matches played by the Queensland Reds 2010 Super 14 team, making his debut for Australia later that year against England, becoming Wallaby No. 842.

In 2011 Daley started at loose head prop in the Super Rugby Championship winning Queensland Reds team, beating the Canterbury Crusaders to win their first title of the professional era.

In 2015, Daley founded 'Be Great Do Good,' an initiative aimed at promoting the idea that an athlete can be great on the field, whilst doing good off it. Using his scrum cap as a vehicle to drive the campaign, Daley supported a different charity each week during the Super Rugby season, with the logos and colors unique to that charity being emblazoned on his headgear. The one-of-a-kind headgear was then used by the charity to raise funds for their cause.

Further in 2015, he graduated with a Bachelor of Laws from Bond University.

== Super Rugby statistics ==
As of 16 June 2019

Season	Team	Games	Starts	Sub	Mins	Tries	Cons	Pens	Drops	Points	Yel	Red
2008	Reds	1	0	1	11	0	0	0	0	0	0	0
2009	Reds	5	5	0	378	0	0	0	0	0	0	0
2010	Reds	12	12	0	897	0	0	0	0	0	0	0
2011	Reds	17	16	1	1150	1	0	0	0	5	1	0
2012	Reds	15	9	6	651	0	0	0	0	0	0	0
2013	Reds	7	1	6	184	0	0	0	0	0	0	0
2014	Reds	11	5	6	435	1	0	0	0	5	0	0
2015	Reds	8	0	8	186	0	0	0	0	0	0	0
2016	Reds	4	2	2	152	0	0	0	0	0	0	0
2017	Force	8	5	3	349	0	0	0	0	0	0	0
2018	Rebels	7	1	6	116	0	0	0	0	0	0	0
2019	Rebels	0	0	0	0	0	0	0	0	0	0	0
Total		95	56	39	4544	2	0	0	0	10	1	0
