= Vili Faingaʻa =

- Born: Viliami Fainga'a; 27 March 1988 (age 38) Queanbeyan, New South Wales, Australia
- Height: 1.83 m (6 ft 0 in)
- Weight: 90 kg (200 lb)
- School: St Edmund's College, Canberra
- Notable relative(s): Anthony Fainga'a; Saia Fainga'a; Colby Fainga'a

Rugby union career
- Position: Flanker
Senior career
| Years | Team | Apps | (Points) |
| 2011-12 | University | | |
| 2013- | GPS | | |
International career
| Years | Team | Apps | (Points) |
| 2012– | Tonga | 3 | (0) |
- Correct as of 16 April 2014

Viliami Fainga'a (born 27 March 1988) is an Australian born professional rugby union footballer. He currently plays for the Brisbane Premier side GPS and also Tonga. Fainga'a will debut as a rugby union coach in 2016 when he takes on the position of head coach for the UQ Women's first XV team.

== Family and early life ==
Fainga'a was born in Queanbeyan, New South Wales, and started playing rugby league with the Queanbeyan Kangaroos. He attended St. Edmund's College.

His older brothers Anthony and Saia (twins), and younger brother Colby are also professional rugby union players. The Fainga'a's are of Tongan, English and Italian descent.

== Rugby league ==
After leaving school he played rugby league, most notably for the Canberra Raiders Jersey Flegg side in 2007 and Melbourne Storm under 20s side in 2008. He played 24 games scoring 1 try. He moved to Queensland playing for the Ipswich Jets in the Queensland Cup before returning to rugby union in 2011.

== Rugby union ==
Fainga'a moved back to rugby union in 2011 playing for the University of Queensland Rugby Club before joining his older brothers at GPS in 2012. He made his international debut for Tonga in 2012 against Samoa.
