= Anthony Fainga'a =

Australia international rugby union player

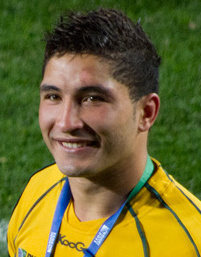
- Born: Anthony Fainga'a; 2 February 1987 (age 39) Queanbeyan, New South Wales, Australia
- Height: 1.82 m (6 ft 0 in)
- Weight: 92 kg (203 lb)
- School: St Edmund's College, Canberra
- Notable relative(s): Vili Fainga'a; Saia Fainga'a; Colby Fainga'a

Rugby union career
- Position: Centre
- Current team: GPS
Senior career
Years	Team	Apps	(Points)
2016−19	Kintetsu Liners	24	(5)
- Correct as of 15 January 2017
Provincial / State sides
Years	Team	Apps	(Points)
2007	Canberra Vikings	4	(15)
2014-15	Queensland Country	4	(0)
Super Rugby
Years	Team	Apps	(Points)
2007–08	Brumbies	4	(5)
2009–16	Reds	90	(20)
2017	Brumbies	0	
- Correct as of 21 July 2016
International career
Years	Team	Apps	(Points)
2010–13	Australia	23	(10)
2006	Australia U-21	4	(5)
2006	Australia U-19	5	(18)
2004	Australia Schoolboys	3	(?)
- Correct as of 30 September 2012
National sevens team
Years	Team		Comps
2007	Australia Sevens		5
Medal record
Men's rugby union
Representing Australia
Rugby World Cup
Bronze medal – third place	2011 New Zealand	Squad

Anthony Fainga'a (born 2 February 1987) is an Australian former professional rugby union footballer. His usual position is centre.

== Family and early life ==
Anthony Fainga'a was born in Queanbeyan, New South Wales, and started playing rugby league as a five-year-old with the Queanbeyan Kangaroos. He attended St. Edmund's College where he first represented the school's 1st XV aged 15. He was selected as vice-captain of the Australian Schools team in 2004.

Anthony's twin brother Saia, and younger brothers Vili and Colby are also professional rugby union players. The Fainga'a's are of Tongan and Aboriginal descent.

== Rugby career ==
Fainga'a was vice captain of the World Championship-winning Australian Under 19's in 2006. He sealed Australia's 17–13 Under 19 final win over New Zealand with a late drop goal and was later nominated for the International Rugby Board's Under 19 Player of the Year. He also represented the Australian Under 21s in 2006.

Fainga'a made his Super 14 debut for the Brumbies against the Bulls in 2007 after recovering from a Lisfranc fracture in his left foot and added a further two caps during the season, coming off the bench against the Stormers and Sharks.

A confident ball player and punishing defender, Fainga'a was called into the Australian Sevens side for the final two tournaments of the 2007 World Series in London and Edinburgh. He played in all eight matches for the Canberra Vikings in the Mazda Australian Rugby Championship, taking on the goal kicking duties at the back end of the season.

In 2008, Anthony and his twin brother Saia signed on with Queensland Reds for the 2009 season. He joined the Reds Development Tour to Ireland and France at the end of 2008 and made his full Reds debut in 2009. At the start of the 2010 season, he lined up as the Reds' starting No. 12.

Fainga'a made his test debut for Australia against the All Blacks in Melbourne in 2010. He played in 16 matches of the Reds 2011 Super Rugby title-winning season in including the semi-final win over the Blues and final victory over the Crusaders. He was selected alongside his brother Saia in the Wallabies squad for the 2011 Rugby World Cup in New Zealand, where Australia took third place.
