= Saia Fainga'a =

Australia international rugby union player

- Born: Saia M. Fainga'a; 2 February 1987 (age 39) Queanbeyan, New South Wales, Australia
- Height: 187 cm (6 ft 2 in)
- Weight: 108 kg (17 st 0 lb; 238 lb)
- School: St Edmund's College, Canberra
- Notable relative(s): Vili Fainga'a; Anthony Fainga'a; Colby Fainga'a

Rugby union career
- Position: Hooker
- Current team: GPS
Senior career
Years	Team	Apps	(Points)
2007	Canberra Vikings	4	(5)
2014–2017	Queensland Country	5	(5)
2017–2020	London Irish	17	(0)
- Correct as of 4 November 2015
Super Rugby
Years	Team	Apps	(Points)
2006–2008	Brumbies	27	(0)
2009–2016	Reds	99	(40)
2017	Brumbies	3	
- Correct as of 21 July 2016
International career
Years	Team	Apps	(Points)
2010–2015	Australia	36	(0)
2006	Australia U-19	4	(0)
2006	Australia U-21	3	(0)
2003–2004	Australia Schoolboys	6	(?)
- Correct as of 30 November 2014
National sevens team
Years	Team		Comps
2008–09	Australia Sevens		
Medal record
Men's rugby union
Representing Australia
Rugby World Cup
Bronze medal – third place	2011 New Zealand	Squad

Saia Fainga'a (born 2 February 1987) is a retired Australian professional rugby union footballer.

== Family and early life ==
Saia Fainga'a was born in Queanbeyan, New South Wales, and started playing rugby union at the age of 11 or 12 at the Queanbeyan club. He was a member of the Brumbies Academy from the age of 14 and attended St Edmund's College, Canberra, where he was selected for the Australian Schools team in 2003 and 2004.

Saia's twin brother Anthony, and younger brothers Vili and Colby are also professional rugby union players. The Fainga'a's are of Tongan English and Italian descent.

== Career ==
Fainga'a made his Super 14 debut in 2006. He was fast-tracked into the Brumbies' side due to injuries in the squad, and played his first senior match for the Brumbies against the Stormers in Cape Town. Later that year he captained the Australian Under 19s team to win the IRB World Championship in Dubai. Fainga'a went on to earn 27 super rugby caps at the Brumbies from 2006 to 2008. In 2008, Saia and his twin brother Anthony signed on to play with the Queensland Reds for the 2009 season. He made his Test debut for Australia in 2010 against Fiji in Canberra. He played in all 18 matches of the Reds 2011 Super Rugby title-winning season, and was selected alongside his brother Anthony in the Wallabies squad for the 2011 Rugby World Cup in New Zealand, where Australia took third place.

On 2 June 2017 it was announced he would move to England after signing for newly promoted Premiership side London Irish. He was released ahead of the 2020–21 season.
