= Rory Sidey =

Australian rugby union player

- Born: Rory John Sidey; 4 July 1986 (age 40) Sydney, Australia
- Height: 1.88 m (6 ft 2 in)
- Weight: 100 kg (15 st 10 lb)
- School: Trinity Grammar School, NSW
- University: Macquarie University, Bachelor of Laws

Rugby union career
- Position: Centre / Wing
- Current team: West Harbour RFC
Senior career
Years	Team	Apps	(Points)
2007	Western Sydney Rams	5	(15)
2008–09	Newport Gwent Dragons	18	(10)
Super Rugby
Years	Team	Apps	(Points)
2010	Waratahs	4	(5)
2011–12	Force	26	(20)
2013	Rebels	15	(5)
- Correct as of 15 June 2013

Rory Sidey (born 4 July 1986) is an Australian rugby union player who played for the New South Wales Waratahs, Western Force and Melbourne Rebels. His primary position is inside centre.

== Early years ==
Sidey was educated at Trinity Grammar School, NSW. He represented NSW Under 19s, and Western Sydney Rams in the sole Australian Rugby Championship, having played his club rugby for West Harbour RFC in the Shute Shield.

He spent the 2008/09 northern hemisphere season playing for the Newport Gwent Dragons in Wales and played 18 games in the Magners League and the European Heineken Cup.

== Super Rugby ==
In August 2009, Sidey signed with the Sydney-based NSW Waratahs. He scored a try on debut for the Waratahs playing off the bench in the season opener against the Queensland Reds at Suncorp in their come from behind win. Sidey also played in the Super Rugby Semi-final which the Waratahs lost to the Stormers at Newlands, South Africa. Stad He spent 2011 and 2012 with the Western Force in Perth cementing a spot at inside centre and scoring 4 tries in his opening season for the Force including a double against the Queensland Reds For the 2013 season he joined the Melbourne Rebels.

He made his Rebels debut in round 1 of the 2013 Super Rugby season, against the Force, at home at AAMI Park. He played inside centre.

== Education ==
Sidey is a Chinese linguist and has a Bachelor of Law from Macquarie University.
