= Van Humphries =

Australian rugby union player (born 1976)

- Born: Van Humphries; 8 January 1976 (age 50) Moree, New South Wales, Australia
- Height: 2.03 m (6 ft 8 in)
- Weight: 116 kg (18 st 4 lb)

Rugby union career
- Position: Lock
Senior career
| Years | Team | Apps | (Points) |
| 2004–05 | Viadana | | |
| 2007 | Western Sydney Rams | 7 | (0) |
- Correct as of 12 February 2014
Super Rugby
| Years | Team | Apps | (Points) |
| 2002–03 | Waratahs | 12 | (10) |
| 2004 & 2008–12 | Reds | 54 | (15) |
- Correct as of 24 May 2012

Van Humphries (born 8 January 1976 in Moree, New South Wales) is an Australian rugby union player for the Queensland Reds in the Super Rugby competition.

== Career ==
Humphries returned to Australia in 2007 and played for the Western Sydney Rams in the ill-fated Australian Rugby Championship and was the form lock of the competition until a broken leg cut his season short. Humphries is currently into his third stint at the Queensland Reds and also played for clubs in Italy and Japan as well as playing for New South Wales Waratahs for many seasons and he has represented Australia A.
