= Robert Ebersohn =

South African rugby union player

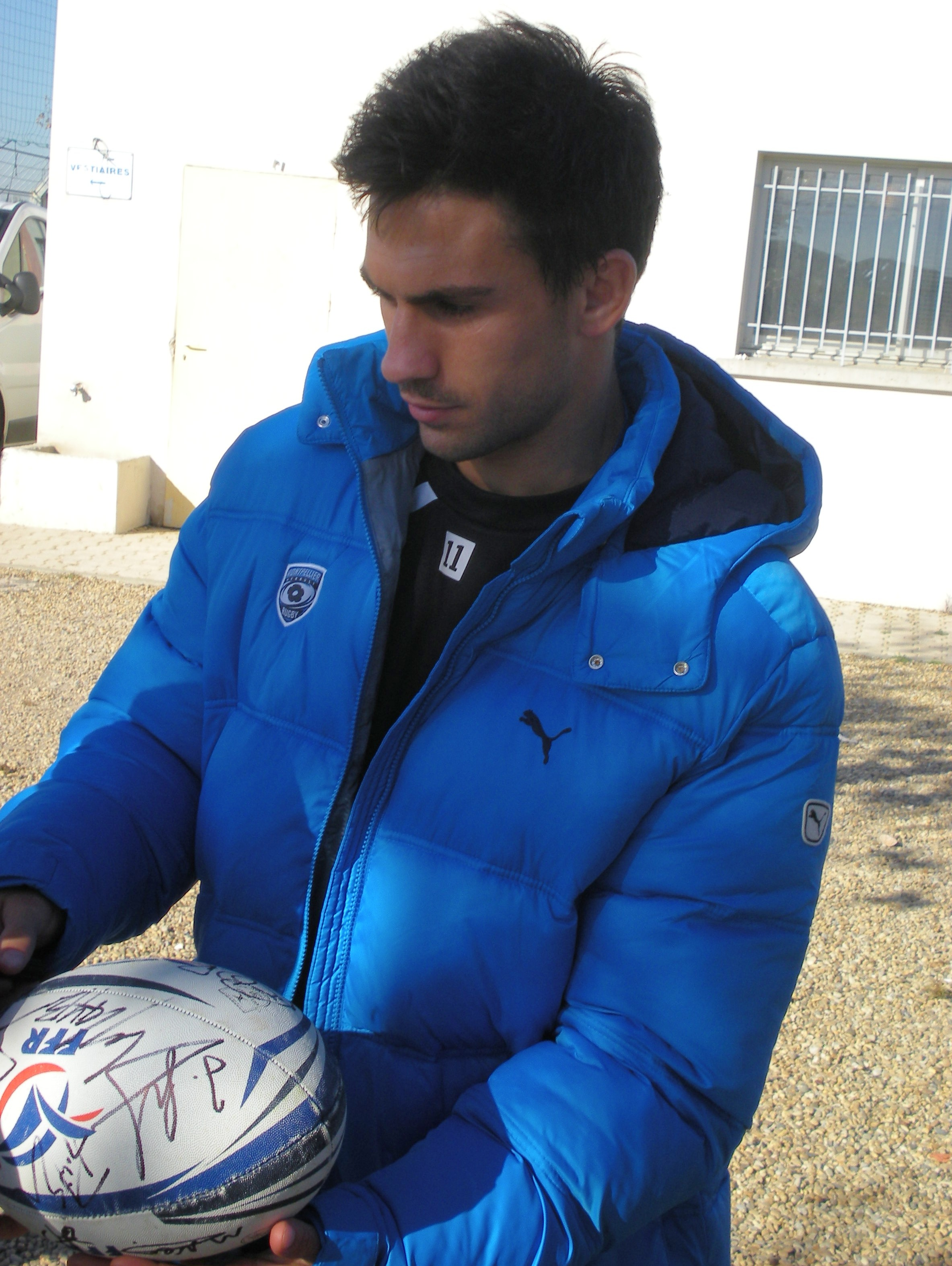
- Ebersohn signing a rugby ball
- Full name: Robert Thompson Ebersohn
- Born: 23 February 1989 (age 37) Bloemfontein, South Africa
- Height: 1.80 m (5 ft 11 in)
- Weight: 87 kg (13 st 10 lb; 192 lb)
- School: Grey College, Bloemfontein
- Notable relative: Sias Ebersohn (twin brother)

Rugby union career
- Position: Centre
- Current team: Cheetahs / Free State Cheetahs
Youth career
- 2005–2007: Free State Cheetahs
Amateur team(s)
Years	Team	Apps	(Points)
2008	UFS Shimlas	2	(5)
Senior career
Years	Team	Apps	(Points)
2008–2013	Free State Cheetahs	72	(55)
2010–2013	Cheetahs	59	(55)
2013–2016	Montpellier	54	(25)
2016–2020	Castres	97	(35)
2020–2021	Béziers	24	(5)
2021–	Free State Cheetahs	10	(5)
2021–	Cheetahs		
- Correct as of 10 July 2022
International career
Years	Team	Apps	(Points)
2007	S.A. Schools		
2008–2009	South Africa U20	10	(20)
2008–2011	Blitzbokke	12	
- Correct as of 26 July 2013

Robert Thompson Ebersohn (born 23 February 1989) is a rugby union and Sevens professional player from South Africa. He has played for the Springboks Sevens, South Africa Under 20 and made his Super 14 debut for the Cheetahs in 2010. When participating in the 15-man format of rugby, his preferred position is centre although he has been employed as a fullback on various occasions.

Ebersohn has made over 100 appearances for the Cheetahs in all competitions. He has one caps for the boks. However, it was announced that he would leave Bloemfontein at the end of the 2013 Currie Cup Premier Division season and join French side Montpellier for the 2013–14 Top 14 season.

== Ebersohn Twins ==
The Ebersohn twins (Robert and Sias) are the sons of Tiaan Ebersohn, a center who played for the Free State and Western Province. The twins were born and raised in Bloemfontein, South Africa and schooled at Grey College. Here they climbed the ranks and eventually presented the Free State schools team at the national Coca-Cola Craven Week. Fame came fast as they were chosen to present South Africa at the IRB Junior World Championship. Both players were quickly grabbed into the Free State Cheetahs rugby squad. They played side-by-side from school level to Super Rugby level until Sias joined the Australian side of the Western Force in 2013 and Robert joined Montpellier a few months later.

== Religion ==
Robert is a devoted Christian.

== Squads ==
Robert Ebersohn was involved in the following squads:

- 2013
  - Toyota Free State Cheetahs (Currie Cup)
  - Cheetahs (Super Rugby)
  - Springboks (2013 mid-year rugby union tests)
- 2012
  - Toyota Free State Cheetahs (Currie Cup) – Captain
  - Cheetahs (Super Rugby)
- 2011
  - Toyota Free State Cheetahs (Currie Cup)
  - Cheetahs (Super Rugby)
  - Springbok Sevens (IRB Sevens World Series)
- 2010
  - Vodacom Free State Cheetahs (Currie Cup)
  - Cheetahs (Super Rugby)
  - Vodacom Free State Cheetahs (Vodacom Cup)
- 2009
  - Vodacom Free State Cheetahs (Currie Cup)
  - South Africa (IRB Junior World Championship) – Captain
  - Springbok Sevens (Rugby World Cup Sevens)
  - Springbok Sevens (IRB Sevens World Series)
- 2008
  - Springbok Sevens (IRB Sevens World Series)
  - South Africa (IRB Junior World Championship)
  - Vodacom Free State Cheetahs (Currie Cup)
  - Vodacom Free State Cheetahs (Vodacom Cup)
  - Shimlas (FNB Varsity Cup)
- 2007
  - Free State U/19 (ABSA U/19 Competition)
  - SA Schools (SA Schools)
  - Free State (U18 Coca-Cola Craven Week)
- 2006
  - Free State (U18 Coca-Cola Craven Week)
- 2005
  - Free State (U16 Coca-Cola Grant Khomo Week)

== Honours ==
- 2015–16 European Rugby Challenge Cup : winner.
