= Daniel Kirkpatrick =

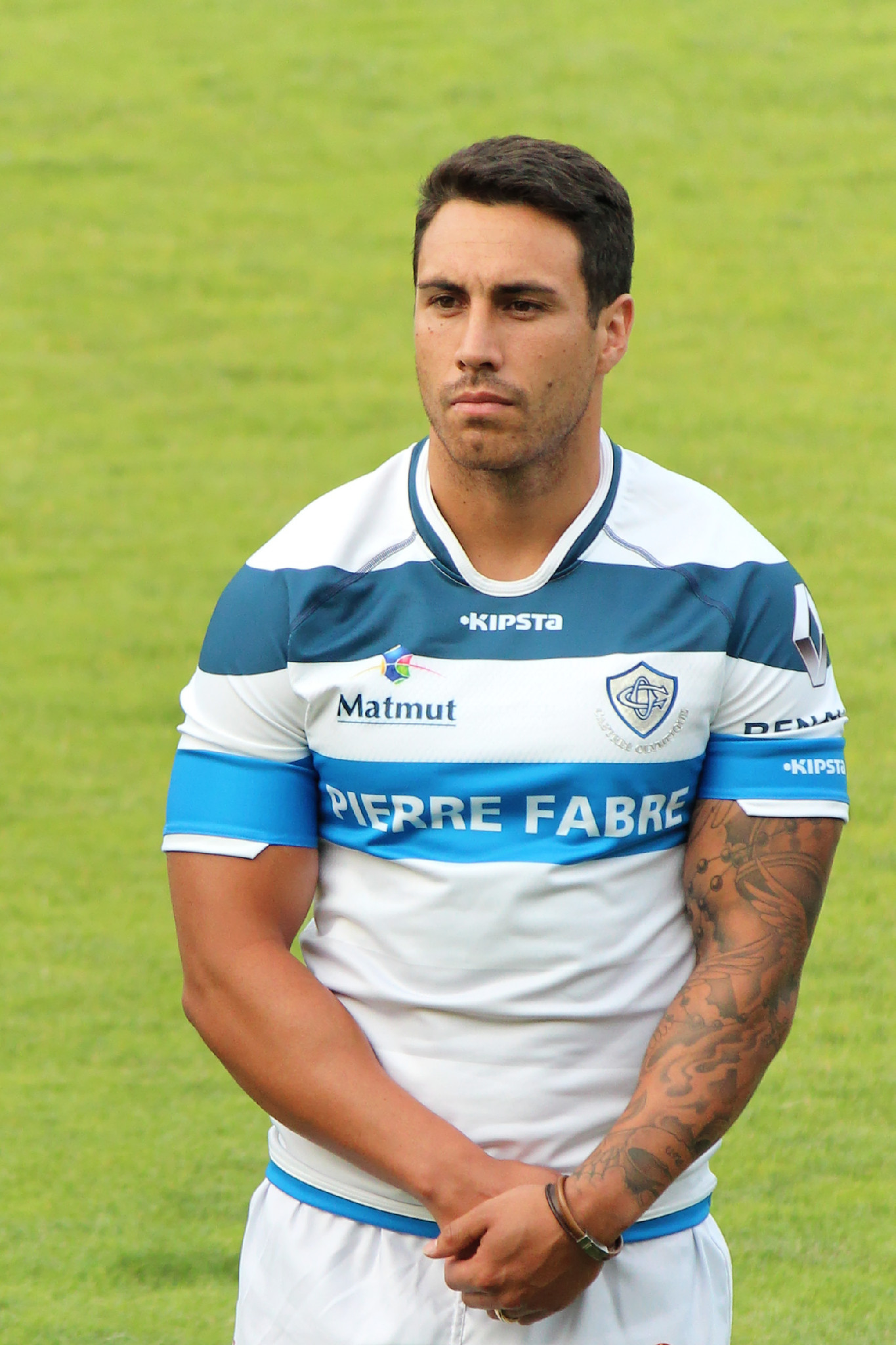
- Born: 28 November 1988 (age 37) Napier, New Zealand
- Height: 1.82 m (6 ft 0 in)
- Weight: 85 kg (187 lb)
- School: Napier Boys High School
- University: Victoria University of Wellington

Rugby union career
- Position: Fly-half
Senior career
| Years | Team | Apps | (Points) |
| 2012–2015 | Castres | 58 | (28) |
| 2016–2017 | SC Albi | 19 | (160) |
- Correct as of 20 August 2017
Provincial / State sides
| Years | Team | Apps | (Points) |
| 2007–2009, 2017 | Wellington | 31 | (142) |
| 2010–2011 | Hawke's Bay | 16 | (54) |
| 2018–2019 | Auckland | 11 | (19) |
- Correct as of 5 January 2024
Super Rugby
| Years | Team | Apps | (Points) |
| 2009, 2011-2012 | Hurricanes | 15 | (98) |
| 2010, 2018 | Blues | 10 | (0) |
- Correct as of 26 November 2018
International career
| Years | Team | Apps | (Points) |
| 2007 | New Zealand under-19 | 4 | (37) |
| 2008 | New Zealand under-20 | 4 | (23) |
- Correct as of 26 November 2018

Daniel Kirkpatrick (born 28 November 1988) is a New Zealand rugby union player. He currently plays for the Blues in Super Rugby. He has also played for Auckland in the Mitre 10 Cup.

Prior to his 2012 move to France, he played for the Hurricanes in Super Rugby and for Hawkes Bay in the ITM Cup. He made his Hurricanes debut in 2009. In 2010 he played for the Auckland Blues, before returning to Wellington in 2011.

He was a part of the team that won the 2007 IRB U19 World Championship in Belfast, and the New Zealand U20 team that contested the IRB U20 World Cup in Wales.

In 2012 it was announced that he had signed with French club Castres.

He signed with SC Albi in 2016.

== Honours ==
=== Club ===
(France) Castres

- Top 14: 2012–13
