= St Edmund's College, Canberra =

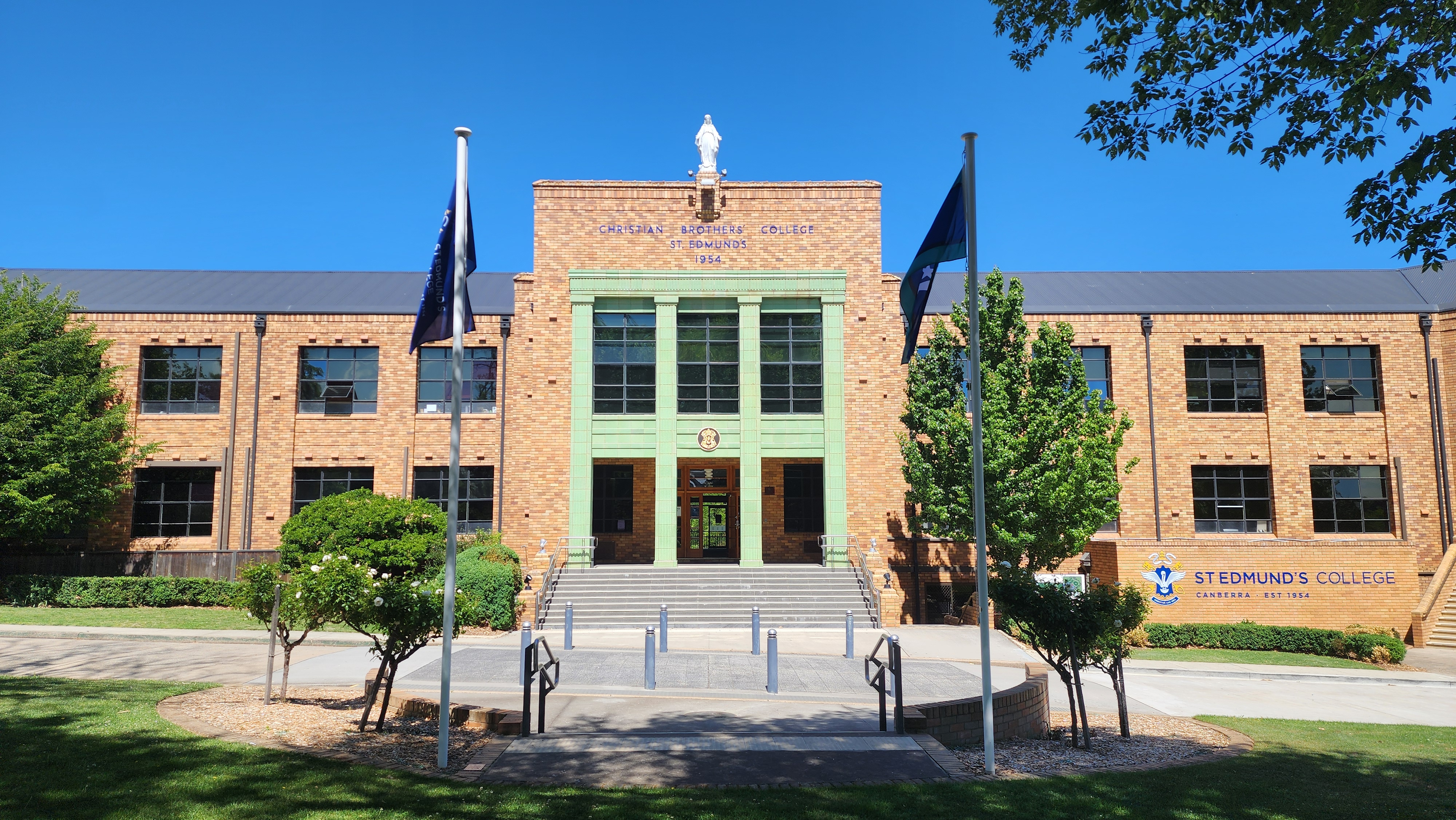

Location
- Canberra, Australian Capital Territory; Australia; 35°19′22″S 149°08′43″E

Information
- Type: Independent primary and secondary day school
- Motto: Latin: Christus Lux Mea (Christ is My Light)
- Religious affiliation: Catholicism
- Denomination: Congregation of Christian Brothers
- Patron saint: Edmund Ignatius Rice
- Established: 1954; 72 years ago (as St Edmund's War Memorial College)
- Founder: Congregation of Christian Brothers
- Trust: Edmund Rice Education Australia
- Principal: John Couani (interim)
- Years offered: 4–12
- Gender: Boys
- Campus: Griffith
- Colours: Blue, white and gold
- Affiliation: Associated Southern Colleges
- Website: sec.act.edu.au

St Edmund's College, Canberra is an independent Catholic primary and secondary school for boys, in Griffith, a suburb of Canberra, in the Australian Capital Territory (ACT), Australia.

The college was established in 1954 by the Christian Brothers as St Edmund's War Memorial College. It was opened to meet the demand for a Catholic education school in the region and was the first Catholic secondary boys' college established in the Australian Capital Territory. St Edmund's College practises in the tradition of Edmund Ignatius Rice. The principal of the college is John Couani (interim).

Students are placed into houses for sporting and other events. The current houses and colours are: Clancy (yellow), Treacy (dark blue), O'Brien (white), Haydon (red), Mulrooney (sky blue) and Rice (green).

== History ==
St Edmund's War Memorial College opened in 1954 as a Christian Brothers school in response to the needs of Catholic parents of the region. St Edmund's was the first Catholic secondary boys' college established in Canberra.

=== Headmasters / principals ===
Headteachers include Brother N. T. Landener, in post 1960–65.

== Rugby union ==
The college has won the Waratah Shield more than any other school (14 times) and was the defending champion in 2005, when schools from the ACT were no longer invited/permitted to participate by the organisers, the New South Wales Rugby Union.

== Ancillary bodies ==
The St Edmund's College Foundation aims to give financial assistance to disadvantaged families for children's education.

The St Edmund's College Old Boys and Friends Association was established in 2015.

== Notable alumni ==
=== Arts ===
- Tommy Murphy – playwright
- Flip Simmons – actor and singer

=== Business ===
- John A. Bryant – president and CEO of Kellogg's and director of Macy's, Inc

=== Politics, public service, and law ===
- Terence Higgins AO – former Chief Justice of the Supreme Court of the Australian Capital Territory (2003–2013)

=== Religion ===
- Pat Power – Auxiliary Bishop Emeritus of Canberra and Goulburn

=== Sport ===
- Finlay Bealham – Irish rugby union player for Ireland national rugby union team and Connacht Rugby
- Anthony Fainga'a – rugby union footballer for the Wallabies and the Brumbies
- Saia Fainga'a – rugby union footballer for the Wallabies and the Brumbies
- Matt Giteau – former rugby union footballer for the Wallabies and the Brumbies
- Jordan Jackson-Hope – Australian rugby union player
- Alex Jesaulenko – Australian rules football player
- Stephen Simmonds – Paralympic swimming medallist and disabled waterski world champion
- Ricky Stuart – former dual-code rugby player, rugby league coach

== See also ==
- List of schools in the Australian Capital Territory
- Associated Southern Colleges
- Catholic education in Australia
