= List of 2012–13 Super Rugby transfers =

This is a list of transfers involving Super Rugby teams between the end of the 2012 Super Rugby season and the end of the 2013 Super Rugby season.

Players listed are all players that were named in the initial senior squad, or subsequently included in a 22-man matchday squad at any game during the season.

(did not play) denotes that a player did not play at all during one of the two seasons due to injury or non-selection. These players are included to indicate they remained attached to the team.

(short-term) denotes that a player wasn't initially contracted, but came in during the season. This could either be a club rugby player coming in during an injury crisis or a player whose contract expired at another team, typically in the northern hemisphere.

Australian and New Zealand teams will name their squads (typically containing 30 players). They can also name additional players that usually serve as backup or development players for the franchises. These players are denoted by (wider training group) (New Zealand teams) or (extended playing squad) (Australian teams) below. In South Africa, all teams have affiliated domestic teams playing in the local Vodacom Cup competition.

Players might be used in different positions, but will be listed in their most common positions during the two seasons.

Flags are only shown for international transfers.

== Australia ==
=== Brumbies ===
Brumbies transfers 2012–13
Pos	2012 squad	Out	In	2013 squad
PR	Ben Alexander; Ruaidhri Murphy (extended playing squad); Jono Owen (did not play); Dan Palmer; Scott Sio (extended playing squad); Jerry Yanuyanutawa (did not play)	(substituted off) Jono Owen (to Rebels)^{‡} (substituted off) Jerry Yanuyanutawa (to (England) London Irish)	(substituted on) Ruan Smith (from Force)	Ben Alexander; Ruaidhri Murphy; Dan Palmer; Scott Sio; Ruan Smith (extended playing squad)
HK	Anthony Hegarty; Stephen Moore; Siliva Siliva (did not play)	(substituted off) Anthony Hegarty (to (France) Grenoble)	(substituted on) Joshua Mann-Rea (from Waratahs)	Joshua Mann-Rea (extended playing squad); Stephen Moore; Siliva Siliva
LK	Sam Carter; Scott Fardy (extended playing squad); Ben Hand; Leon Power	(substituted off) Ben Hand (to (France) Grenoble)	(substituted on) Etienne Oosthuizen (from (South Africa) Lions)	Sam Carter; Scott Fardy; Etienne Oosthuizen; Leon Power
FL	Fotu Auelua; Colby Fainga'a; Michael Hooper; Peter Kimlin; Ita Vaea	(substituted off) Michael Hooper (to Waratahs)	(substituted on) David Pocock (from Force); (substituted on) Jordan Smiler (from Northern Suburbs); (substituted on) George Smith (from (Japan) Suntory Sungoliath)	Fotu Auelua; Colby Fainga'a; Peter Kimlin; David Pocock; Jordan Smiler (extended playing squad); George Smith (short-term); Ita Vaea (did not play)
N8	Ben Mowen			Ben Mowen
SH	Ian Prior; Nic White		(substituted on) Mark Swanepoel (from (New Zealand) Canterbury)	Ian Prior; Mark Swanepoel (extended playing squad); Nic White
FH	Zack Holmes; Matt To'omua			Zack Holmes; Matt To'omua
CE	Tevita Kuridrani; Christian Lealiifano; Pat McCabe; Andrew Smith			Tevita Kuridrani; Christian Lealiifano; Pat McCabe; Andrew Smith
WG	Tom Cox (did not play); Kimami Sitauti (did not play); Henry Speight; Joe Tomane	(substituted off) Kimami Sitauti (to Rebels)	(substituted on) Clyde Rathbone (unattached)	Tom Cox (did not play); Clyde Rathbone; Henry Speight; Joe Tomane
FB	Robbie Coleman; Cam Crawford; Jesse Mogg (extended playing squad)	(substituted off) Cam Crawford (to Waratahs)		Robbie Coleman; Jesse Mogg

^{‡} Jono Owen was released by the Brumbies during the season and joined the Rebels on a short-term deal.

=== Force ===
Force transfers 2012–13
Pos	2012 squad	Out	In	2013 squad
PR	Pekahou Cowan; Tetera Faulkner; Kieran Longbottom; Salesi Ma'afu; Salesi Manu (extended playing squad); Ruan Smith (short-term)	(substituted off) Ruan Smith (to Brumbies)		Pekahou Cowan; Tetera Faulkner; Kieran Longbottom; Salesi Ma'afu; Salesi Manu (extended playing squad)
HK	Nathan Charles; Elvis Taione (extended playing squad); Ben Whittaker	(substituted off) Elvis Taione (to Jersey)	(substituted on) James Hilterbrand (from Manly); (substituted on) Heath Tessmann (from Rebels)	Nathan Charles; James Hilterbrand (extended playing squad); Heath Tessmann (short-term); Ben Whittaker
LK	Oliver Atkins (short-term); Phoenix Battye; Toby Lynn; Nathan Sharpe; Sam Wykes	(substituted off) Oliver Atkins (to Waratahs); (substituted off) Nathan Sharpe (retired)	(substituted on) Rory Walton (from Northern Suburbs)	Phoenix Battye; Toby Lynn; Rory Walton (extended playing squad); Sam Wykes
FL	Richard Brown; Angus Cottrell (extended playing squad); Matt Hodgson; Anare Koliavu (short-term); David Pocock	(substituted off) Anare Koliavu (to Kalamunda); (substituted off) David Pocock (to Brumbies)	(substituted on) Chris Alcock (from Waratahs); (substituted on) Hugh McMeniman (from (Japan) Kubota Spears)	Chris Alcock; Richard Brown; Angus Cottrell; Matt Hodgson; Hugh McMeniman
N8	Lachlan McCaffrey; Ben McCalman			Lachlan McCaffrey (did not play); Ben McCalman
SH	Josh Holmes (short-term); Brett Sheehan; Justin Turner	(substituted off) Josh Holmes (to Warringah); (substituted off) Justin Turner (to Associates)	(substituted on) Chris Eaton (from (New Zealand) Hurricanes); (substituted on) Alby Mathewson (from (New Zealand) Blues); (substituted on) Michael Snowden (from Eastwood)	Chris Eaton (short-term, did not play); Alby Mathewson; Brett Sheehan; Michael Snowden (extended playing squad)
FH	Kyle Godwin (extended playing squad); Ben Seymour; James Stannard	(substituted off) Ben Seymour (to Agen); (substituted off) James Stannard (to (Japan) Toyota Shokki)	(substituted on) Sam Christie (from (New Zealand) Waikato); (substituted on) Sias Ebersohn (from (South Africa) Cheetahs)	Sam Christie; Sias Ebersohn; Kyle Godwin
CE	Patrick Dellit; Gene Fairbanks (did not play); Rory Sidey; Winston Stanley; Will Tupou	(substituted off) Gene Fairbanks (to (Japan) Kintetsu Liners); (substituted off) Rory Sidey (to Rebels)	(substituted on) Jayden Hayward (from (New Zealand) Hurricanes); (substituted on) Ben Jacobs (from (Japan) Kyuden Voltex); (substituted on) Junior Rasolea (from Australia Sevens); (substituted on) Chris Tuatara-Morrison (from Northern Suburbs)	Patrick Dellit; Jayden Hayward; Ben Jacobs (short-term); Junior Rasolea; Winston Stanley; Chris Tuatara-Morrison (did not play); Will Tupou
WG	Nick Cummins; Alfie Mafi; Napolioni Nalaga; Jordan Rapana (did not play); Samu Wara (extended playing squad)	(substituted off) Napolioni Nalaga (to (France) Clermont); (substituted off) Jordan Rapana (to Canberra Raiders); (substituted off) Samu Wara (to Port Macquarie Sharks)	(substituted on) Ed Stubbs (from Australia Sevens)	Nick Cummins; Alfie Mafi; Ed Stubbs
FB	David Harvey (short-term); Cameron Shepherd	(substituted off) David Harvey (to Warringah); (substituted off) Cameron Shepherd (to (England) Sale Sharks)	(substituted on) Sam Norton-Knight (from (Japan) Panasonic Wild Knights)	Sam Norton-Knight

=== Rebels ===
Rebels transfers 2012–13
Pos	2012 squad	Out	In	2013 squad
PR	Eddie Aholelei (extended playing squad); Paul Alo-Emile; Rodney Blake; Nic Henderson; Jono Owen (short-term); Laurie Weeks	(substituted off) Rodney Blake (to West Harbour); (substituted off) Jono Owen (to Reds)		Eddie Aholelei (did not play); Paul Alo-Emile; Nic Henderson; Laurie Weeks
HK	Adam Freier; Luke Holmes (extended playing squad); Ged Robinson; Heath Tessmann (did not play)	(substituted off) Adam Freier (retired); (substituted off) Luke Holmes (to Waratahs); (substituted off) Heath Tessmann (to Force)	(substituted on) Shota Horie (from (Japan) Panasonic Wild Knights); (substituted on) Patrick Leafa (from Tuggeranong Vikings)	Shota Horie; Patrick Leafa (extended playing squad); Ged Robinson
LK	Adam Byrnes; Alister Campbell; Luke Jones; James King (did not play); Cadeyrn Neville (extended playing squad); Hugh Pyle	(substituted off) Adam Byrnes (to (Russia) Kuban Krasnodar); (substituted off) Alister Campbell (retired)	(substituted on) Chris Thomson (from (France) Narbonne)	Luke Jones; James King; Cadeyrn Neville; Hugh Pyle; Chris Thomson (did not play)
FL	Tom Chamberlain; Tim Davidson; Ryan Hodson (short-term); Michael Lipman; Hugh Perrett (short-term); Jarrod Saffy	(substituted off) Tom Chamberlain (to (Japan) tbc); (substituted off) Ryan Hodson (returned to Cottesloe); (substituted off) Michael Lipman (retired); (substituted off) Hugh Perrett (returned to Eastwood)	(substituted on) Scott Fuglistaller (from (New Zealand) Highlanders); (substituted on) Scott Higginbotham (from Reds); (substituted on) Jordy Reid (from Manly)	Tim Davidson; Scott Fuglistaller; Scott Higginbotham; Jordy Reid (extended playing squad); Jarrod Saffy
N8	Gareth Delve			Gareth Delve
SH	Nick Phipps; Nic Stirzaker (extended playing squad)		(substituted on) Luke Burgess (from (France) Toulouse)	Luke Burgess (short-term); Nick Phipps; Nic Stirzaker
FH	Danny Cipriani; James Hilgendorf	(substituted off) Danny Cipriani (to (England) Sale Sharks)	(substituted on) Angus Roberts (from Sydney University)	Angus Roberts; James Hilgendorf (short-term)
CE	Mitch Inman; Lloyd Johansson; Lachlan Mitchell; Stirling Mortlock; James O'Connor	(substituted off) Lloyd Johansson (to Harlequin); (substituted off) Stirling Mortlock (retired)	(substituted on) Tom English (from Sydney University); (substituted on) Rory Sidey (from Force)	Tom English (extended playing squad); Mitch Inman; Lachlan Mitchell; James O'Connor; Rory Sidey
WG	Richard Kingi; Mark Gerrard; Cooper Vuna	(substituted off) Mark Gerrard (to (Japan) Toyota Shokki)	(substituted on) Kimami Sitauti (from Brumbies)	Richard Kingi; Kimami Sitauti; Cooper Vuna
FB	Kurtley Beale; Julian Huxley	(substituted off) Julian Huxley (to (France) Narbonne)	(substituted on) Bryce Hegarty (from Brisbane Broncos); (substituted on) Alex Rokobaro (from (France) Stade Français); (substituted on) Jason Woodward (from (New Zealand) Wellington Lions)	Kurtley Beale; Bryce Hegarty (extended playing squad); Alex Rokobaro; Jason Woodward

=== Reds ===
Reds transfers 2012–13
Pos	2012 squad	Out	In	2013 squad
PR	Ben Daley; Greg Holmes; Guy Shepherdson (did not play); James Slipper	(substituted off) Guy Shepherdson (retired)	(substituted on) Jono Owen (from Rebels)	Ben Daley; Greg Holmes; Jono Owen (did not play); James Slipper
HK	Albert Anae (extended playing squad); Saia Fainga'a; James Hanson			Albert Anae; Saia Fainga'a; James Hanson
LK	Blake Enever (short-term); James Horwill; Van Humphries; David McDuling (did not play); Rob Simmons; Adam Wallace-Harrison	(substituted off) Blake Enever (to extended playing squad); (substituted off) Van Humphries (retired)	(substituted on) Ed O'Donoghue (from (England) London Wasps)	James Horwill; David McDuling (did not play); Ed O'Donoghue (academy); Rob Simmons; Adam Wallace-Harrison
FL	Liam Gill; Scott Higginbotham; Eddie Quirk; Beau Robinson; Jake Schatz	(substituted off) Scott Higginbotham (to Rebels)	(substituted on) Nigel Ah Wong (from Sunnybank); (substituted on) Curtis Browning (from University of Queensland)	Nigel Ah Wong (extended playing squad, did not play); Curtis Browning (academy); Liam Gill; Eddie Quirk; Beau Robinson; Jake Schatz
N8	Jarrad Butler (short-term); Radike Samo			Jarrad Butler (extended playing squad); Radike Samo
SH	Nick Frisby (extended playing squad); Will Genia			Nick Frisby; Will Genia
FH	Quade Cooper; Sam Lane (short-term); Ben Lucas; Dallan Murphy (extended playing squad)	(substituted off) Sam Lane (to Waratahs); (substituted off) Dallan Murphy (to Aix)		Quade Cooper; Ben Lucas
CE	Anthony Fainga'a; Mike Harris; Jono Lance; Joelin Rapana (short-term); Ben Tapuai; Aidan Toua	(substituted off) Joelin Rapana (to (Hong Kong) HKFC Rugby)		Anthony Fainga'a; Mike Harris; Jono Lance; Ben Tapuai; Aidan Toua
WG	Nathan Eyres-Brown (short-term); Chris Feauai-Sautia; Peter Hynes (did not play); Digby Ioane; Dom Shipperley	(substituted off) Nathan Eyres-Brown (to (Romania) Farul Constanţa); (substituted off) Peter Hynes (retired)		Chris Feauai-Sautia; Digby Ioane; Dom Shipperley
FB	Rod Davies; Luke Morahan			Rod Davies; Luke Morahan

=== Waratahs ===
Waratahs transfers 2012–13
Pos	2012 squad	Out	In	2013 squad
PR	Sekope Kepu; Benn Robinson; Paddy Ryan; Jeremy Tilse		(substituted on) Richard Aho (from Randwick)	Richard Aho (short-term); Sekope Kepu; Benn Robinson; Paddy Ryan; Jeremy Tilse
HK	Damien Fitzpatrick; Joshua Mann-Rea (short-term); Tatafu Polota-Nau; John Ulugia	(substituted off) Joshua Mann-Rea (to Brumbies)	(substituted on) Luke Holmes (from Rebels)	Damien Fitzpatrick (did not play); Luke Holmes (extended playing squad); Tatafu Polota-Nau; John Ulugia
LK	Kane Douglas; Dean Mumm; Greg Peterson (did not play); Lopeti Timani (extended playing squad); Sitaleki Timani; Dan Vickerman (did not play)	(substituted off) Dean Mumm (to (England) Exeter Chiefs); (substituted off) Dan Vickerman (retired)	(substituted on) Ollie Atkins (from Force); (substituted on) Adam Coleman (from Parramatta); (substituted on) Jed Holloway (from Southern Districts); (substituted on) Will Skelton (from Sydney University)	Ollie Atkins; Adam Coleman (short-term); Kane Douglas; Jed Holloway (extended playing squad); Greg Peterson; Will Skelton (extended playing squad); Lopeti Timani; Sitaleki Timani
FL	Chris Alcock; Dave Dennis; Rocky Elsom; Jono Jenkins (short-term); Pat McCutcheon	(substituted off) Chris Alcock (to Force); (substituted off) Rocky Elsom (to (Japan) Kobelco Steelers); (substituted off) Jono Jenkins (to (France) Narbonne)	(substituted on) Mitchell Chapman (from (Japan) NTT DoCoMo Red Hurricanes); (substituted on) AJ Gilbert (from Northern Suburbs); (substituted on) Michael Hooper (from Brumbies); (substituted on) Liam Winton (from Sydney University)	Mitchell Chapman; Dave Dennis; AJ Gilbert (short-term); Michael Hooper; Pat McCutcheon; Liam Winton (short-term)
N8	Tevita Metuisela (extended playing squad); Wycliff Palu; Richard Stanford (short-term)	(substituted off) Tevita Metuisela (to (Japan) Hino Red Dolphins); (substituted off) Richard Stanford (returned to Eastern Suburbs)		Wycliff Palu
SH	Grayson Hart (extended playing squad); Brendan McKibbin; Sarel Pretorius	(substituted off) Sarel Pretorius (to (South Africa) Cheetahs)	(substituted on) Matt Lucas (from Sunnybank)	Grayson Hart (did not play); Matt Lucas (extended playing squad); Brendan McKibbin
FH	Berrick Barnes; Daniel Halangahu	(substituted off) Daniel Halangahu (to (Italy) Zebre)	(substituted on) Ben Volavola (from Southern Districts)	Berrick Barnes; Ben Volavola (extended playing squad)
CE	Tom Carter; Rob Horne		(substituted on) Israel Folau (from GWS); (substituted on) Michael Hodge (from Sydney University)	Tom Carter; Israel Folau; Michael Hodge (did not play); Rob Horne
WG	Adam Ashley-Cooper; Peter Betham (short-term); Brackin Karauria-Henry; Tom Kingston; Drew Mitchell; Atieli Pakalani; Lachlan Turner	(substituted off) Brackin Karauria-Henry (to (Japan) NTT Communications Shining Arcs); (substituted off) Atieli Pakalani (to Southern Districts)	(substituted on) Terrence Hepetema (from Randwick)	Adam Ashley-Cooper; Peter Betham; Terrence Hepetema (short-term); Tom Kingston; Drew Mitchell; Lachlan Turner
FB	Bernard Foley; Nathan Trist (extended playing squad)	(substituted off) Nathan Trist (to Sydney University)	(substituted on) Cam Crawford (from Brumbies)	Cam Crawford; Bernard Foley

== New Zealand ==
=== Blues ===
Blues transfers 2012–13
Pos	2012 squad	Out	In	2013 squad
PR	Charlie Faumuina; Tevita Mailau; Pauliasi Manu; Tom McCartney; Angus Ta'avao; Tony Woodcock	(substituted off) Tevita Mailau (to (France) Mont-de-Marsan); (substituted off) Pauliasi Manu (to Chiefs wider training group); (substituted off) Tony Woodcock (to Highlanders)	(substituted on) Tim Perry (from Tasman); (substituted on) Sam Prattley (from Auckland); (substituted on) Ofa Tu'ungafasi (from Auckland)	Charlie Faumuina; Tom McCartney; Tim Perry; Sam Prattley (short-term); Angus Ta'avao; Ofa Tu'ungafasi
HK	Keven Mealamu; James Parsons (wider training group)		(substituted on) Quentin MacDonald (from Crusaders); (substituted on) Gafatasi Su'a (from Auckland)	Quentin MacDonald; Keven Mealamu; James Parsons; Gafatasi Su'a (short-term, did not play)
LK	Anthony Boric; Liaki Moli; Filo Paulo; Andrew van der Heijden (short-term); Ali Williams	(substituted off) Filo Paulo (to (Wales) Cardiff Blues); (substituted off) Andrew van der Heijden (to Auckland)	(substituted on) Ronald Raaymakers (from Counties Manukau); (substituted on) Culum Retallick (from Highlanders)	Anthony Boric; Liaki Moli; Ronald Raaymakers; Culum Retallick; Ali Williams
FL	Daniel Braid; Luke Braid; Chris Lowrey; Steve Luatua (wider training group); Sean Polwart (wider training group); Dan Pryor (wider training group)	(substituted off) Daniel Braid (to (England) Sale Sharks); (substituted off) Chris Lowrey (to (Japan) Toyota Shokki); (substituted off) Sean Polwart (to wider training group); (substituted off) Dan Pryor (to Northland)	(substituted on) Kane Barrett (from Taranaki); (substituted on) Brendon O'Connor (from Crusaders)	Kane Barrett; Luke Braid; Steve Luatua; Brendon O'Connor
N8	Cam Goodhue (short-term); Jerome Kaino; Brad Mika; Peter Saili	(substituted off) Cam Goodhue (returned to Northland); (substituted off) Jerome Kaino (to (Japan) Toyota Verblitz); (substituted off) Brad Mika (to College Rifles RFC)		Peter Saili
SH	Alby Mathewson; Piri Weepu	(substituted off) Alby Mathewson (to (Australia) Force)	(substituted on) Jamison Gibson-Park (from Taranaki); (substituted on) Bryn Hall (from North Harbour); (substituted on) Wayne Ngaluafe (from Auckland)	Jamison Gibson-Park; Bryn Hall; Wayne Ngaluafe (short-term); Piri Weepu
FH	Orene Ai'i (short-term); Gareth Anscombe; Michael Hobbs	(substituted off) Orene Ai'i (to Northland); (substituted off) Gareth Anscombe (to Chiefs); (substituted off) Michael Hobbs (to (Japan) Panasonic Wild Knights)	(substituted on) Baden Kerr (from Counties Manukau); (substituted on) Chris Noakes (from Highlanders)	Baden Kerr; Chris Noakes
CE	Ma'a Nonu; Rene Ranger; Francis Saili (wider training group); Benson Stanley	(substituted off) Ma'a Nonu (to Highlanders); (substituted off) Benson Stanley (to (France) Clermont)	(substituted on) Malakai Fekitoa (from Auckland); (substituted on) Jackson Willison (from Chiefs)	Malakai Fekitoa (did not play); Rene Ranger; Francis Saili; Jackson Willison
WG	Ben Lam (short-term); George Moala; Albert Nikoro (short-term); David Raikuna; Sherwin Stowers; Rudi Wulf	(substituted off) Ben Lam (to N.Z. Sevens); (substituted off) David Raikuna (to N.Z. Sevens); (substituted off) Sherwin Stowers (to N.Z. Sevens); (substituted off) Rudi Wulf (to (France) Toulon)	(substituted on) Frank Halai (from Counties Manukau); (substituted on) Waisake Naholo (from Taranaki); (substituted on) Lolagi Visinia (from Auckland)	Frank Halai; George Moala; Waisake Naholo; Albert Nikoro (wider training group); Lolagi Visinia (wider training group)
FB	Lachie Munro; Hadleigh Parkes (wider training group); Charles Piutau (short-term); Isaia Toeava	(substituted off) Lachie Munro (to (France) Bordeaux); (substituted off) Hadleigh Parkes (to (South Africa) Southern Kings); (substituted off) Isaia Toeava (to (Japan) Canon Eagles)	(substituted on) Marty McKenzie (from Southland)	Marty McKenzie; Charles Piutau

=== Chiefs ===
Chiefs transfers 2012–13
Pos	2012 squad	Out	In	2013 squad
PR	Ben Afeaki; Shane Cleaver; Josh Hohneck (wider training group); Toby Smith; Ben Tameifuna; Sona Taumalolo	(substituted off) Shane Cleaver (to Taranaki); (substituted off) Sona Taumalolo (to (France) Perpignan)	(substituted on) Pauliasi Manu (from Blues); (substituted on) Solomona Sakalia (from Wellington)	Ben Afeaki; Josh Hohneck (did not play); Pauliasi Manu (wider training group); Solomona Sakalia (did not play); Toby Smith; Ben Tameifuna
HK	Marcel Cummings-Toone (wider training group); Hika Elliot; Mahonri Schwalger	(substituted off) Marcel Cummings-Toone (to Waikato)	(substituted on) Mike Kainga (from Bay of Plenty); (substituted on) Rhys Marshall (from Taranaki)	Hika Elliot; Mike Kainga (wider training group); Rhys Marshall; Mahonri Schwalger
LK	Craig Clarke; Michael Fitzgerald; Romana Graham; Brodie Retallick			Craig Clarke; Michael Fitzgerald; Romana Graham; Brodie Retallick
FL	Sam Cane; Tanerau Latimer; Liam Messam; Scott Waldrom	(substituted off) Scott Waldrom (to Taranaki)	(substituted on) Nick Crosswell (from Highlanders); (substituted on) Ross Filipo (from Wellington)	Sam Cane; Nick Crosswell; Ross Filipo; Tanerau Latimer; Liam Messam
N8	Alex Bradley; Fritz Lee; Kane Thompson	(substituted off) Alex Bradley (to Waikato); (substituted off) Kane Thompson (to (Japan) Canon Eagles)	(substituted on) Matt Vant Leven (from Waikato)	Fritz Lee; Matt Vant Leven (wider training group)
SH	Tawera Kerr-Barlow; Brendon Leonard; Augustine Pulu (wider training group)			Tawera Kerr-Barlow; Brendon Leonard (short-term); Augustine Pulu
FH	Aaron Cruden		(substituted on) Daniel Waenga (from Hawke's Bay)	Aaron Cruden; Daniel Waenga (short-term)
CE	Richard Kahui; Sonny Bill Williams; Jackson Willison	(substituted off) Sonny Bill Williams (to (Japan) Panasonic Wild Knights); (substituted off) Jackson Willison (to Blues)	(substituted on) Bundee Aki (from Counties Manukau); (substituted on) Charlie Ngatai (from Hurricanes); (substituted on) Savenaca Tokula (from Waikato)	Bundee Aki; Richard Kahui; Charlie Ngatai; Savenaca Tokula (short-term)
WG	Lelia Masaga; Tim Nanai-Williams; Maritino Nemani; Declan O'Donnell; Asaeli Tikoirotuma	(substituted off) Maritino Nemani (to wider training group); (substituted off) Declan O'Donnell (to Highlanders)	(substituted on) Patrick Osborne (from Crusaders)	Lelia Masaga; Tim Nanai-Williams; Patrick Osborne; Asaeli Tikoirotuma
FB	Andrew Horrell; Robbie Robinson		(substituted on) Gareth Anscombe (from Blues)	Gareth Anscombe; Andrew Horrell; Robbie Robinson

=== Crusaders ===
Crusaders transfers 2012–13
Pos	2012 squad	Out	In	2013 squad
PR	Nick Barrett (did not play); Wyatt Crockett; Ben Franks; Owen Franks	(substituted off) Nick Barrett (to Southland); (substituted off) Ben Franks (to Hurricanes)	(substituted on) Nepo Laulala (from Canterbury); (substituted on) Joe Moody (from Canterbury)	Wyatt Crockett; Owen Franks; Nepo Laulala; Joe Moody
HK	Corey Flynn; Ben Funnell; Quentin MacDonald	(substituted off) Quentin MacDonald (to Blues)	(substituted on) Codie Taylor (from Canterbury)	Corey Flynn; Ben Funnell; Codie Taylor
LK	Tom Donnelly; Ross Kennedy; Luke Romano; Joe Wheeler (did not play); Sam Whitelock	(substituted off) Ross Kennedy (to Hawke's Bay); (substituted off) Joe Wheeler (to Highlanders)	(substituted on) Dominic Bird (from Canterbury)	Dominic Bird; Tom Donnelly; Luke Romano; Sam Whitelock
FL	Richie McCaw; Brendon O'Connor (wider training group); Matt Todd; George Whitelock; Luke Whitelock	(substituted off) Brendon O'Connor (to Blues)	(substituted on) Shane Christie (from Tasman); (substituted on) Jordan Taufua (from Canterbury); (substituted on) Jimmy Tupou (from Counties Manukau)	Shane Christie; Richie McCaw (did not play); Jordan Taufua; Matt Todd; Jimmy Tupou; George Whitelock; Luke Whitelock
N8	Kieran Read			Kieran Read
SH	Andy Ellis; Willi Heinz		(substituted on) Jeremy Su'a (from Tasman)	Andy Ellis; Willi Heinz; Jeremy Su'a (did not play)
FH	Tyler Bleyendaal; Dan Carter; Tom Taylor			Tyler Bleyendaal; Dan Carter; Tom Taylor
CE	Ryan Crotty; Robbie Fruean; Adam Whitelock			Ryan Crotty; Robbie Fruean; Adam Whitelock
WG	Zac Guildford; Sean Maitland; Patrick Osborne	(substituted off) Sean Maitland (to (Scotland) Glasgow Warriors); (substituted off) Patrick Osborne (to Chiefs)	(substituted on) Johnny McNicholl (from Canterbury); (substituted on) Telusa Veainu (from Highlanders wider training group)	Zac Guildford; Johnny McNicholl; Telusa Veainu (short-term)
FB	Israel Dagg; Tom Marshall			Israel Dagg; Tom Marshall

=== Highlanders ===
Highlanders transfers 2012–13
Pos	2012 squad	Out	In	2013 squad
PR	Jacob Ellison (wider training group); Ma'afu Fia; Chris King; Jamie Mackintosh; Bronson Murray	(substituted off) Jacob Ellison (to (Japan) Fukuoka Sanix Blues)	(substituted on) Tony Woodcock (from Blues)	Ma'afu Fia; Chris King; Jamie Mackintosh; Bronson Murray (wider training group); Tony Woodcock
HK	Andrew Hore; Brayden Mitchell (wider training group); Jason Rutledge		(substituted on) Liam Coltman (from Otago)	Liam Coltman; Andrew Hore; Brayden Mitchell; Jason Rutledge (short-term)
LK	Josh Bekhuis; Jarrad Hoeata; Hoani MacDonald (short-term); Culum Retallick	(substituted off) Hoani MacDonald (to Southland); (substituted off) Culum Retallick (to Blues)	(substituted on) Brad Thorn (from (Japan) Fukuoka Sanix Blues); (substituted on) Joe Wheeler (from Crusaders)	Josh Bekhuis; Jarrad Hoeata; Brad Thorn; Joe Wheeler
FL	Tim Boys (short-term); Nick Crosswell; Scott Fuglistaller (short-term); John Hardie; James Haskell; Adam Thomson; Doug Tietjens	(substituted off) Nick Crosswell (to Chiefs); (substituted off) Scott Fuglistaller (to (Australia) Rebels); (substituted off) James Haskell (to (England) London Wasps); (substituted off) Adam Thomson (to (Japan) Canon Eagles); (substituted off) Doug Tietjens (to wider training squad)	(substituted on) TJ Ioane (from Otago); (substituted on) Jake Paringatai (from (Japan) Fukuoka Sanix Blues); (substituted on) Mose Tuiali'i (from (Japan) Yamaha Júbilo)	Tim Boys; John Hardie; TJ Ioane (short-term); Jake Paringatai; Mose Tuiali'i (short-term)
N8	Elliot Dixon; Nasi Manu			Elliot Dixon; Nasi Manu
SH	Jimmy Cowan; Aaron Smith	(substituted off) Jimmy Cowan (to (England) Gloucester)	(substituted on) Fumiaki Tanaka (from (Japan) Panasonic Wild Knights); (substituted on) Frae Wilson (from Hurricanes)	Aaron Smith; Fumiaki Tanaka; Frae Wilson (wider training group)
FH	Mike Delany (short-term); Chris Noakes; Colin Slade; Lima Sopoaga	(substituted off) Mike Delany (returned to (Japan) Panasonic Wild Knights); (substituted off) Chris Noakes (to Blues)	(substituted on) Hayden Parker (from Otago)	Hayden Parker; Colin Slade; Lima Sopoaga
CE	Phil Burleigh (short-term); Tamati Ellison; Kendrick Lynn; Shaun Treeby	(substituted off) Kendrick Lynn (to Bay of Plenty)	(substituted on) Jason Emery (from Manawatu); (substituted on) Ma'a Nonu (from Blues)	Phil Burleigh; Tamati Ellison; Jason Emery; Ma'a Nonu; Shaun Treeby
WG	Kurt Baker; Hosea Gear; Siale Piutau; Kade Poki; Buxton Popoali'i (wider training group); Telusa Veainu	(substituted off) Kurt Baker (to Crusaders wider training group); (substituted off) Siale Piutau (to (Japan) Yamaha Júbilo); (substituted off) Telusa Veainu (to Crusaders)	(substituted on) Tony Ensor (from Otago); (substituted on) Maritino Nemani (from Chiefs wider training group); (substituted on) Declan O'Donnell (from Chiefs); (substituted on) Trent Renata (from Waikato)	Tony Ensor (wider training group); Hosea Gear; Maritino Nemani (short-term); Declan O'Donnell (did not play); Kade Poki; Buxton Popoali'i; Trent Renata (short-term)
FB	Ben Smith			Ben Smith

=== Hurricanes ===
Hurricanes transfers 2012–13
Pos	2012 squad	Out	In	2013 squad
PR	Michael Bent; Reggie Goodes; Ben May; Tristan Moran; Jeffery Toomaga-Allen	(substituted off) Michael Bent (to (Ireland) Leinster); (substituted off) Tristan Moran (to Bay of Plenty)	(substituted on) Ben Franks (from Crusaders); (substituted on) Eric Sione (from Wellington); (substituted on) John Schwalger (from Agen)	Ben Franks; Reggie Goodes; Ben May; John Schwalger (short-term); Eric Sione (did not play); Jeffery Toomaga-Allen
HK	Dane Coles; David Hall (did not play); Motu Matu'u	(substituted off) David Hall (to Northland)	(substituted on) Ash Dixon (from Hawke's Bay)	Dane Coles; Ash Dixon (wider training squad); Motu Matu'u
LK	James Broadhurst; Jason Eaton; Mark Reddish; Jeremy Thrush			James Broadhurst; Jason Eaton; Mark Reddish; Jeremy Thrush
FL	Jack Lam; Faifili Levave; Karl Lowe; Brad Shields		(substituted on) Ardie Savea (from Wellington)	Jack Lam; Faifili Levave; Karl Lowe; Ardie Savea; Brad Shields
N8	Mike Coman (wider training group); Victor Vito	(substituted off) Mike Coman (to wider training squad)	(substituted on) Blade Thomson (from Taranaki)	Blade Thomson; Victor Vito
SH	Chris Eaton; TJ Perenara; Chris Smylie (did not play); Frae Wilson (wider training group)	(substituted off) Chris Eaton (to (Australia) Force); (substituted off) Frae Wilson (to Highlanders wider training group)	(substituted on) Samisoni Fisilau (from Northland)	Samisoni Fisilau (did not play); TJ Perenara; Chris Smylie
FH	Beauden Barrett; Daniel Kirkpatrick; Tusi Pisi	(substituted off) Daniel Kirkpatrick (to (France) Castres)	(substituted on) James Marshall (from Taranaki)	Beauden Barrett; James Marshall; Tusi Pisi
CE	Tim Bateman; Jayden Hayward; Charlie Ngatai; Conrad Smith	(substituted off) Jayden Hayward (to (Australia) Force); (substituted off) Charlie Ngatai (to Chiefs)	(substituted on) Rey Lee-Lo (from Counties Manukau); (substituted on) Ope Peleseuma (from Wellington)	Tim Bateman; Rey Lee-Lo; Ope Peleseuma (wider training group); Conrad Smith
WG	Richard Buckman; Cory Jane; Alapati Leiua; Julian Savea	(substituted off) Richard Buckman (to wider training squad)	(substituted on) Matt Proctor (from Wellington)	Cory Jane (did not play); Alapati Leiua; Matt Proctor; Julian Savea
FB	Andre Taylor			Andre Taylor

== South Africa ==
=== Bulls ===
Bulls transfers 2012–13
Pos	2012 squad	Out	In	2013 squad
PR	Rayno Gerber; Dean Greyling; Frik Kirsten; Werner Kruger; Dawie Steyn	(substituted off) Rayno Gerber (to (Italy) Rovigo); (substituted off) Dawie Steyn (to Blue Bulls)	(substituted on) Morné Mellett (from Blue Bulls); (substituted on) Hencus van Wyk (from Blue Bulls)	Dean Greyling; Frik Kirsten; Werner Kruger; Morné Mellett; Hencus van Wyk
HK	Bongi Mbonambi; Chiliboy Ralepelle; Willie Wepener	(substituted off) Bongi Mbonambi (to Blue Bulls)	(substituted on) Callie Visagie (on loan from Lions)	Chiliboy Ralepelle; Callie Visagie (short-term); Willie Wepener
LK	Juandré Kruger; Wilhelm Steenkamp; Flip van der Merwe		(substituted on) Grant Hattingh (from Lions); (substituted on) Cornell Hess (from Blue Bulls); (substituted on) Paul Willemse (from Lions)	Grant Hattingh; Cornell Hess (did not play); Juandré Kruger; Wilhelm Steenkamp; Flip van der Merwe; Paul Willemse
FL	Arno Botha; Dewald Potgieter; Jacques Potgieter; CJ Stander; Deon Stegmann	(substituted off) CJ Stander (to (Ireland) Munster)	(substituted on) Jacques du Plessis (from Blue Bulls)	Arno Botha; Jacques du Plessis; Dewald Potgieter; Jacques Potgieter; Deon Stegmann
N8	Pierre Spies; Gerrit-Jan van Velze	(substituted off) Gerrit-Jan van Velze (to (England) Northampton Saints)	(substituted on) Jean Cook (from Blue Bulls); (substituted on) Jono Ross (from Blue Bulls)	Jean Cook; Jono Ross; Pierre Spies
SH	Francois Hougaard; Ruan Snyman; Jano Vermaak		(substituted on) Rudy Paige (from Blue Bulls)	Francois Hougaard; Rudy Paige; Ruan Snyman (did not play); Jano Vermaak
FH	Lionel Cronjé (did not play); Louis Fouché; Morné Steyn	(substituted off) Lionel Cronjé (to Lions)		Louis Fouché; Morné Steyn
CE	JJ Engelbrecht; Wynand Olivier; Johann Sadie; Francois Venter	(substituted off) Johann Sadie (to Cheetahs)	(substituted on) Jan Serfontein (from Blue Bulls)	JJ Engelbrecht; Wynand Olivier; Jan Serfontein; Francois Venter
WG	Bjorn Basson; Akona Ndungane		(substituted on) Lionel Mapoe (on loan from Lions); (substituted on) Sampie Mastriet (from Blue Bulls)	Bjorn Basson; Lionel Mapoe (short-term); Sampie Mastriet; Akona Ndungane
FB	Zane Kirchner; Jurgen Visser (did not play)		(substituted on) Ulrich Beyers (from Blue Bulls)	Ulrich Beyers; Zane Kirchner; Jurgen Visser

=== Cheetahs ===
Cheetahs transfers 2012–13
Pos	2012 squad	Out	In	2013 squad
PR	Lourens Adriaanse; W. P. Nel; Trevor Nyakane; Coenie Oosthuizen; Marcel van der Merwe	(substituted off) W. P. Nel (to (Scotland) Edinburgh); (substituted off) Marcel van der Merwe (to Blue Bulls)	(substituted on) Rossouw de Klerk (from Blue Bulls); (substituted on) Caylib Oosthuizen (from Lions)	Lourens Adriaanse; Rossouw de Klerk (did not play); Trevor Nyakane; Caylib Oosthuizen; Coenie Oosthuizen
HK	Ryno Barnes; Hercú Liebenberg; Adriaan Strauss			Ryno Barnes; Hercú Liebenberg (did not play); Adriaan Strauss
LK	George Earle; Andries Ferreira; Francois Uys; Izak van der Westhuizen; Waltie Vermeulen	(substituted off) George Earle (to (Wales) Scarlets); (substituted off) Izak van der Westhuizen (to (Scotland) Edinburgh)	(substituted on) Lood de Jager (from Leopards); (substituted on) Ligtoring Landman (from Griquas)	Lood de Jager; Andries Ferreira (did not play); Ligtoring Landman; Francois Uys; Waltie Vermeulen
FL	Heinrich Brüssow; Justin Downey; Lappies Labuschagné; Boom Prinsloo; Philip van der Walt	(substituted off) Justin Downey (to Griquas)	(substituted on) Frans Viljoen (from (Italy) Aironi)	Heinrich Brüssow; Lappies Labuschagné; Boom Prinsloo; Philip van der Walt; Frans Viljoen
N8	Ashley Johnson; Davon Raubenheimer	(substituted off) Ashley Johnson (to (England) London Wasps)		Davon Raubenheimer (did not play)
SH	Jacques Coetzee; Tewis de Bruyn; Piet van Zyl	(substituted off) Jacques Coetzee (to Griquas)	(substituted on) Sarel Pretorius (from (Australia) Waratahs)	Tewis de Bruyn; Sarel Pretorius; Piet van Zyl
FH	Sias Ebersohn; Johan Goosen; Riaan Smit	(substituted off) Sias Ebersohn (to (Australia) Force)	(substituted on) Francois Brummer (from Griquas); (substituted on) Burton Francis (from Stormers); (substituted on) Hansie Graaff (from Griffons); (substituted on) Elgar Watts (from Boland Cavaliers)	Francois Brummer; Burton Francis; Johan Goosen; Hansie Graaff (did not play); Riaan Smit; Elgar Watts
CE	Robert Ebersohn; Barry Geel; Philip Snyman; Andries Strauss	(substituted off) Philip Snyman (to South Africa Sevens); (substituted off) Andries Strauss (to Southern Kings)	(substituted on) Howard Mnisi (from NMMU Madibaz); (substituted on) Johann Sadie (from Bulls)	Robert Ebersohn; Barry Geel; Howard Mnisi; Johann Sadie
WG	Rayno Benjamin; Cameron Jacobs; Rocco Jansen; Willie le Roux; Dusty Noble; Nico Scheepers	(substituted off) Cameron Jacobs (to Free State Cheetahs); (substituted off) Dusty Noble (to Griquas); (substituted off) Nico Scheepers (to Free State Cheetahs)	(substituted on) Raymond Rhule (from Free State Cheetahs)	Rayno Benjamin; Rocco Jansen (did not play); Willie le Roux; Raymond Rhule
FB	Hennie Daniller			Hennie Daniller

=== Kings ===
The Kings joined the 2013 Super Rugby season at the expense of the Lions. All players joined from Eastern Province Kings unless stated.

Southern Kings transfers 2012–13
Pos	2012 squad	Out	In	2013 squad
PR	—N/a	—N/a	(substituted on) Grant Kemp (from SWD Eagles)	Kevin Buys; Charl du Plessis; Jaco Engels; Schalk Ferreira; Grant Kemp
HK	—N/a	—N/a	(substituted on) Virgile Lacombe (from (France) Toulouse); (substituted on) Bandise Maku (from Lions); (substituted on) Edgar Marutlulle (from Leopards)	Hannes Franklin; Virgile Lacombe; Bandise Maku; Edgar Marutlulle
LK	—N/a	—N/a	(substituted on) Daniel Adongo (from (New Zealand) Counties Manukau); (substituted on) Steven Sykes (from Sharks)	Daniel Adongo; Rynier Bernardo; David Bulbring; Thabo Mamojele; Darron Nell; Steven Sykes
FL	—N/a	—N/a	(substituted on) Tomás Leonardi (from (Argentina) S.I.C.)	Aidon Davis; Cornell du Preez; Tomás Leonardi; Mpho Mbiyozo; Devin Oosthuizen; Wimpie van der Walt
N8	—N/a	—N/a		Jacques Engelbrecht; Luke Watson
SH	—N/a	—N/a	(substituted on) Johan Herbst (from SWD Eagles); (substituted on) Shaun Venter (from Pumas); (substituted on) Nicolás Vergallo (from (France) Toulouse)	Johan Herbst; Shaun Venter; Nicolás Vergallo
FH	—N/a	—N/a	(substituted on) Demetri Catrakilis (from Western Province)	Demetri Catrakilis; Shane Gates; George Whitehead
CE	—N/a	—N/a	(substituted on) Ronnie Cooke (from (France) Grenoble); (substituted on) Waylon Murray (from Lions); (substituted on) Hadleigh Parkes (from (New Zealand) Blues); (substituted on) Andries Strauss (from Cheetahs)	Ronnie Cooke; Waylon Murray; Hadleigh Parkes; Andries Strauss; Scott van Breda
WG	—N/a	—N/a		Siyanda Grey; Michael Killian; Sergeal Petersen; Marcello Sampson
FB	—N/a	—N/a	(substituted on) Elric van Vuuren (from SWD Eagles)	SP Marais; Siviwe Soyizwapi; Elric van Vuuren

=== Lions ===
The Lions will be replaced in the 2013 Super Rugby season by the Kings. All players returned to the domestic Golden Lions team unless stated.

Lions transfers 2012–13
Pos	2012 squad	Out	In	2013 squad
PR	Jacobie Adriaanse; Pat Cilliers; Ruan Dreyer; JC Janse van Rensburg; Caylib Oosthuizen; CJ van der Linde	(substituted off) Jacobie Adriaanse (to (Wales) Scarlets); (substituted off) Pat Cilliers (to Stormers); (substituted off) JC Janse van Rensburg (on loan to Sharks); (substituted off) Caylib Oosthuizen (to Cheetahs)	—N/a	—N/a
HK	Martin Bezuidenhout; Bandise Maku (did not play); Callie Visagie	(substituted off) Martin Bezuidenhout (on loan to Stormers); (substituted off) Bandise Maku (to Southern Kings); (substituted off) Callie Visagie (on loan to Bulls)	—N/a	—N/a
LK	Ruan Botha; Marius Coetzer; Stephan Greeff; Etienne Oosthuizen; Hendrik Roodt; Franco van der Merwe; Wikus van Heerden; Paul Willemse	(substituted off) Ruan Botha (to Stormers); (substituted off) Marius Coetzer (to Pumas); (substituted off) Etienne Oosthuizen (to (Australia) Brumbies); (substituted off) Franco van der Merwe (on loan to Sharks); (substituted off) Wikus van Heerden (retired); (substituted off) Paul Willemse (to Bulls)	—N/a	—N/a
FL	Cobus Grobbelaar; Grant Hattingh; Jaco Kriel; Derick Minnie; Michael Rhodes (did not play)	(substituted off) Cobus Grobbelaar (retired); (substituted off) Grant Hattingh (to Bulls); (substituted off) Derick Minnie (on loan to Sharks); (substituted off) Michael Rhodes (to Stormers)	—N/a	—N/a
N8	Doppies le Roux; Josh Strauss; Warren Whiteley	(substituted off) Doppies le Roux (to Pumas); (substituted off) Josh Strauss (to (Scotland) Glasgow Warriors)	—N/a	—N/a
SH	Michael Bondesio; Ross Cronjé; Tian Meyer; Whestley Moolman (did not play)	(substituted off) Tian Meyer (to Pumas)	—N/a	—N/a
FH	Butch James; Elton Jantjies	(substituted off) Butch James (to Sharks); (substituted off) Elton Jantjies (on loan to Stormers)	—N/a	—N/a
CE	Dylan des Fountain (did not play); Alwyn Hollenbach; Doppies la Grange; Waylon Murray	(substituted off) Doppies la Grange (to (Italy) Treviso); (substituted off) Waylon Murray (to Southern Kings)	—N/a	—N/a
WG	Ruan Combrinck; JR Esterhuizen; Michael Killian; Lionel Mapoe; Deon van Rensburg; Anthony Volmink	(substituted off) Michael Killian (to Southern Kings); (substituted off) Lionel Mapoe (on loan to Bulls)	—N/a	—N/a
FB	Andries Coetzee; James Kamana; Jaco Taute	(substituted off) Andries Coetzee (on loan to Sharks); (substituted off) James Kamana (to (Japan) Kamaishi Seawaves); (substituted off) Jaco Taute (on loan to Stormers)	—N/a	—N/a

=== Sharks ===
Sharks transfers 2012–13
Pos	2012 squad	Out	In	2013 squad
PR	Dale Chadwick; Jannie du Plessis; Wiehahn Herbst; Tendai Mtawarira; Julian Redelinghuys (did not play); Nick Schonert (did not play)	(substituted off) Julian Redelinghuys (to Lions); (substituted off) Nick Schonert (to Griquas)	(substituted on) Allan Dell (from Sharks (Currie Cup)); (substituted on) JC Janse van Rensburg (on loan from Lions); (substituted on) Danie Mienie (from Sharks (Currie Cup))	Dale Chadwick (did not play); Allan Dell (did not play); Jannie du Plessis; Wiehahn Herbst; JC Janse van Rensburg (short-term); Danie Mienie; Tendai Mtawarira
HK	Craig Burden; Kyle Cooper; Bismarck du Plessis; Monde Hadebe (did not play)			Craig Burden; Kyle Cooper; Bismarck du Plessis; Monde Hadebe (did not play)
LK	Anton Bresler; Pieter-Steph du Toit; Jandré Marais; Ross Skeate; Steven Sykes	(substituted off) Ross Skeate (to Agen); (substituted off) Steven Sykes (to Southern Kings)	(substituted on) Edwin Hewitt (from Griquas); (substituted on) Peet Marais (from Sharks (Currie Cup)); (substituted on) Franco van der Merwe (on loan from Lions)	Anton Bresler; Pieter-Steph du Toit; Edwin Hewitt; Jandré Marais; Peet Marais (did not play); Franco van der Merwe (short-term)
FL	Willem Alberts; Jacques Botes; Marcell Coetzee; Jean Deysel; Tera Mtembu		(substituted on) Derick Minnie (on loan from Lions)	Willem Alberts; Jacques Botes; Marcell Coetzee; Jean Deysel; Derick Minnie (short-term); Tera Mtembu
N8	Keegan Daniel; Ryan Kankowski			Keegan Daniel; Ryan Kankowski
SH	Conrad Hoffmann (did not play); Charl McLeod; Cobus Reinach	(substituted off) Conrad Hoffmann (to Hamiltons)	(substituted on) Tian Meyer (from Lions)	Charl McLeod; Tian Meyer (did not play); Cobus Reinach
FH	Patrick Lambie; Frédéric Michalak	(substituted off) Frédéric Michalak (to (France) Toulon)	(substituted on) Butch James (from Lions); (substituted on) Fred Zeilinga (from Sharks (Currie Cup))	Butch James; Patrick Lambie; Fred Zeilinga
CE	Meyer Bosman; Paul Jordaan; Marius Joubert; François Steyn; Tim Whitehead	(substituted off) Marius Joubert (to Sharks (Currie Cup))	(substituted on) Piet Lindeque (from Blue Bulls)	Meyer Bosman; Paul Jordaan; Piet Lindeque (short-term); François Steyn; Tim Whitehead (did not play)
WG	Lwazi Mvovo; Odwa Ndungane; JP Pietersen; S'bura Sithole (did not play)		(substituted on) Sean Robinson (from Sharks (Currie Cup))	Lwazi Mvovo; Odwa Ndungane; JP Pietersen; Sean Robinson; S'bura Sithole
FB	Louis Ludik; Gouws Prinsloo (did not play); Riaan Viljoen	(substituted off) Gouws Prinsloo (to Sharks (Currie Cup))	(substituted on) Andries Coetzee (on loan from Lions); (substituted on) Jaco van Tonder (from Sharks (Currie Cup))	Andries Coetzee (short-term); Louis Ludik; Jaco van Tonder; Riaan Viljoen

=== Stormers ===
Stormers transfers 2012–13
Pos	2012 squad	Out	In	2013 squad
PR	Deon Carstens; Brok Harris; Steven Kitshoff; Frans Malherbe		(substituted on) Pat Cilliers (from Lions); (substituted on) Chris Heiberg (from Western Province); (substituted on) Ross Geldenhuys (on loan from Eastern Province Kings)	Deon Carstens (did not play); Pat Cilliers; Ross Geldenhuys (short-term, did not play); Brok Harris; Chris Heiberg; Steven Kitshoff; Frans Malherbe
HK	Deon Fourie; Tiaan Liebenberg; Scarra Ntubeni		(substituted on) Martin Bezuidenhout (on loan from Lions)	Martin Bezuidenhout (short-term); Deon Fourie; Tiaan Liebenberg; Scarra Ntubeni
LK	Andries Bekker; Eben Etzebeth; Quinn Roux; De Kock Steenkamp	(substituted off) Quinn Roux (to (Ireland) Leinster)	(substituted on) Ruan Botha (from Lions); (substituted on) Marius Coetzer (on loan from Pumas); (substituted on) Gerbrandt Grobler (from Western Province)	Andries Bekker; Ruan Botha (did not play); Marius Coetzer (short-term); Eben Etzebeth; Gerbrandt Grobler; De Kock Steenkamp
FL	Don Armand; Schalk Burger; Rynhardt Elstadt; Nick Fenton-Wells; Tyrone Holmes; Siya Kolisi	(substituted off) Nick Fenton-Wells (to (England) Saracens); (substituted off) Tyrone Holmes (to (France) Colomiers)	(substituted on) Rohan Kitshoff (from Western Province); (substituted on) Michael Rhodes (from Lions)	Don Armand; Schalk Burger (did not play); Rynhardt Elstadt; Rohan Kitshoff; Siya Kolisi; Michael Rhodes
N8	Nizaam Carr; Nick Köster; Jebb Sinclair (short-term); Duane Vermeulen	(substituted off) Nick Köster (to (England) Bath); (substituted off) Jebb Sinclair (returned to (England) London Irish)		Nizaam Carr; Duane Vermeulen
SH	Dewaldt Duvenage; Nic Groom (did not play); Louis Schreuder			Dewaldt Duvenage; Nic Groom; Louis Schreuder
FH	Burton Francis; Peter Grant; Gary van Aswegen	(substituted off) Burton Francis (to Cheetahs)	(substituted on) Kurt Coleman (from Western Province); (substituted on) Elton Jantjies (on loan from Lions)	Kurt Coleman; Peter Grant; Elton Jantjies (short-term); Gary van Aswegen
CE	Marcel Brache; Juan de Jongh; Jean de Villiers; JP du Plessis	(substituted off) Marcel Brache (to Western Province); (substituted off) JP du Plessis (to Western Province)		Juan de Jongh; Jean de Villiers
WG	Gio Aplon; Bryan Habana; Danie Poolman; Gerhard van den Heever	(substituted off) Danie Poolman (to (Ireland) Connacht)	(substituted on) Damian de Allende (from Western Province)	Gio Aplon; Damian de Allende; Bryan Habana; Gerhard van den Heever
FB	Joe Pietersen		(substituted on) Cheslin Kolbe (from Western Province); (substituted on) Jaco Taute (on loan from Lions)	Cheslin Kolbe; Joe Pietersen; Jaco Taute (short-term)

== See also ==
- 2012 Super Rugby season
- 2013 Super Rugby season
- List of 2013–14 Super Rugby transfers
