= 2014 New South Wales Waratahs season =

New South Wales Waratahs
- 2014 season
- Coach: Michael Cheika
- Super Rugby: 1st
- Super Rugby Finals Series: Champions
- Top try scorer: League: Israel Folau (12)
- Top points scorer: League: Bernard Foley (252)
- Highest home attendance: 61,823 vs (New Zealand) Crusaders; 2 August 2014
- Lowest home attendance: 15,773 vs (South Africa) Bulls; 19 April 2014

The 2014 New South Wales Waratahs season was the club's 18th season since the inception of Super Rugby in 1996. The Waratahs defeated the Crusaders in the final at ANZ Stadium, Sydney to be crowned champions for the very first time.

== Players ==
=== Squad ===
The squad for the 2014 Super Rugby season

**Props**: (Australia) Michael Alaalatoa; (Australia) **Sekope Kepu**; (Australia) **Benn Robinson**; (Australia) **Paddy Ryan**; (Australia) Jeremy Tilse; **Hookers**: (Australia) Tolu Latu; (Australia) **Tatafu Polota-Nau**; (Australia) Dave Porecki; (Australia) Hugh Roach; **Locks**: (Australia) Jed Holloway; (New Zealand) Sam Lousi; (Australia) **Dean Mumm**; (Australia) **Will Skelton**	**Loose forwards**: (Australia) Mitchell Chapman; (Australia) Jack Dempsey; (Australia) **Dave Dennis** (c); (Australia) Tala Gray; (Australia) **Stephen Hoiles**; (Australia) **Michael Hooper** (v/c); (Australia) Pat McCutcheon; (Australia) **Wycliff Palu**; (South Africa) **Jacques Potgieter**; **Scrum-halves**: (Samoa) Auvasa Faleali'i; (Australia) Brendan McKibbin; (Australia) **Nick Phipps**; **Fly-halves**: (Australia) **Bernard Foley**; (Australia) David Horwitz; (Australia) Ben Volavola	**Centres**: (Australia) **Adam Ashley-Cooper** (v/c); (Australia) **Rob Horne**; (Australia) Jono Lance; **Wingers**: (Australia) **Peter Betham**; (Australia) Matthew Carraro; (Australia) Andrew Kellaway; (Fiji) Taqele Naiyaravoro; **Fullbacks**: (Australia) **Kurtley Beale**; (Australia) **Israel Folau** (v/c)

(c) Denotes team captain, Bold denotes player is internationally capped.

=== Transfers ===
Ins:

Player	Position	Previous Club	Notes
Michael Alaalatoa	Prop	West Harbour RFC	Short-term contract
Tolu Latu	Hooker	Sydney University	
Hugo Roach	Hooker	Eastwood	
Tala Gray	Flanker	(France) Biarritz	
Jacques Potgieter	Flanker	(South Africa) Bulls	
Stephen Hoiles	Number 8	Randwick	Short-term contract
Nick Phipps	Scrum-half	Rebels	
Matthew Carraro	Centre	(France) Montpellier	
Jono Lance	Centre	Reds	
Alofa Alofa	Wing	West Harbour	
Taqele Naiyaravoro	Wing	(Australia) Wests Tigers (NRL)	
Kurtley Beale	Fullback	Rebels	

Outs:

Player	Position	Moving to	Notes
Richard Aho	Prop	(France) Béziers	
Damien Fitzpatrick	Hooker	(France) Lyon	
Luke Holmes	Hooker	Warringah	
John Ulugia	Hooker	(France) Bourg-en-Bresse	
Ollie Atkins	Lock	(Scotland) Edinburgh	
Adam Coleman	Lock	Force (extended playing squad)	
Greg Peterson	Lock	(to extended playing squad)	
Sitaleki Timani	Lock	(France) Montpellier	
AJ Gilbert	Flanker	Northern Suburbs	
Lopeti Timani	Flanker	Rebels	
Liam Winton	Flanker	Sydney University	
Grayson Hart	Scrum-half	(Scotland) Edinburgh	
Matt Lucas	Scrum-half	(to extended playing squad)	
Berrick Barnes	Fly-half	(Japan) Panasonic Wild Knights	
Tom Carter	Centre	Retired	
Terrence Hepetema	Wing	Randwick	
Tom Kingston	Wing	Rebels	
Drew Mitchell	Wing	(France) Toulon	
Lachlan Turner	Wing	Reds	

== Quick Summary ==
Rd	Date and local time		Opponent	Score	Venue	Attendance	Ref
1	Bye						
2	Sunday, 23 February (4:05 pm)	H	Force	43–21	Allianz Stadium, Sydney, Australia	16,091	
3	Saturday, 1 March (7:40 pm)	H	Queensland Reds	32–5	ANZ Stadium, Sydney, Australia	17,580	
4	Bye						
5	Saturday, 15 March (7:40 pm)	A	Brumbies	28–23	Canberra Stadium, Canberra, Australia	17,016	
6	Friday, 21 March (7:40 pm)	H	Rebels	22–8	Allianz Stadium, Sydney, Australia	16,000	
7	Saturday, 29 March (5:05 pm)	A	(South Africa) Sharks	32–10	Kings Park Stadium, Durban, South Africa	32,724	
8	Saturday, 5 April (7:10 pm)	A	(South Africa) Stormers	11–22	Newlands Stadium, Cape Town, South Africa	25,284	
9	Saturday, 12 April (5:40 pm)	A	Force	28–16	nib Stadium, Perth, Australia	14,281	
10	Saturday, 19 April (7:40 pm)	H	(South Africa) Bulls	19–12	Allianz Stadium, Sydney, Australia	15,773	
11	Friday, 25 April (5:35 pm)	A	(New Zealand) Blues	21–13	Eden Park, Auckland, New Zealand	17,111	
12	Saturday, 3 May (7:40 pm)	H	(New Zealand) Hurricanes	39–30	Allianz Stadium, Sydney, Australia	17,221	
13	Bye						
14	Sunday, 18 May (4:05 pm)	H	(South Africa) Lions	41–13	Allianz Stadium, Sydney, Australia	19,639	
15	Friday, 23 May (7:40 pm)	A	Rebels	19–41	AAMI Park, Melbourne, Australia	12,477	
16	Saturday, 31 May (4:35 pm)	A	(New Zealand) Chiefs	17–33	Yarrow Stadium, New Plymouth, New Zealand		
17	Saturday, 28 June (7:40 pm)	H	Brumbies	39–8	ANZ Stadium, Sydney, Australia		
18	Sunday, 6 July (4:05 pm)	H	(New Zealand) Highlanders	44–16	Allianz Stadium, Sydney, Australia	24,500	
19	Saturday, 12 July (7:40 pm)	A	Reds	3–34	Suncorp Stadium, Brisbane, Australia	36,205	
SF	Saturday, 26 July (7:40 pm)	H	Brumbies	26–8	Allianz Stadium, Sydney, Australia	38,800	
F	Saturday, 2 August (7:40 pm)	H	(New Zealand) Crusaders	33–32	ANZ Stadium, Sydney, Australia	61,823	

== Standings ==
2014 Super Rugby season standings
Pos	Team	Pld	W	D	L	PF	PA	PD	TF	TA	TB	LB	Pts
1	Waratahs (C)	16	12	0	4	481	272	+209	55	24	9	1	58
2	Crusaders	16	11	0	5	445	322	+123	41	36	4	3	51
3	Sharks	16	11	0	5	406	293	+113	29	22	2	4	50
4	Brumbies	16	10	0	6	412	378	+34	49	35	4	1	45
5	Chiefs	16	8	2	6	384	378	+6	44	35	5	3	44
6	Highlanders	16	8	0	8	401	442	−41	39	52	5	5	42
7	Hurricanes	16	8	0	8	439	374	+65	49	36	6	3	41
8	Western Force	16	9	0	7	343	393	−50	37	40	3	1	40
9	Bulls	16	7	1	8	365	335	+30	28	29	3	5	38
10	Blues	16	7	0	9	419	395	+24	46	43	6	3	37
11	Stormers	16	7	0	9	290	326	−36	30	29	2	2	32
12	Lions	16	7	0	9	367	413	−46	31	46	2	1	31
13	Reds	16	5	0	11	374	493	−119	42	52	4	4	28
14	Cheetahs	16	4	1	11	372	527	−155	38	59	3	3	24
15	Rebels	16	4	0	12	303	460	−157	29	49	1	4	21

(C) Champion

(Australia) Australian Conference
Pos	Team	Pld	W	D	L	PF	PA	PD	TF	TA	TB	LB	Pts
1	Waratahs	16	12	0	4	481	272	+209	55	24	9	1	58
2	Brumbies	16	10	0	6	412	378	+34	49	35	4	1	45
3	Western Force	16	9	0	7	343	393	−50	37	40	3	1	40
4	Reds	16	5	0	11	374	493	−119	42	52	4	4	28
5	Rebels	16	4	0	12	303	460	−157	29	49	1	4	21

== Player statistics ==
Player	Caps	Run on	Tries	Cons	Pens	DGs	Pts
Michael Alaalatoa	1	0	–	–	–	–	0
Alofa Alofa	15	12	5	–	–	–	25
Adam Ashley-Cooper	18	18	4	–	–	–	20
Kurtley Beale	18	18	8	–	6	–	58
Peter Betham	7	6	2	–	–	–	10
Matt Carraro	13	2	1	–	–	–	5
Cam Crawford	5	4	–	–	–	–	0
Dave Dennis	13	13	2	–	–	–	10
Kane Douglas	18	18	1	–	–	–	5
Israel Folau	14	14	12	–	–	–	60
Bernard Foley	18	18	6	45	44	–	252
Tala Gray	1	0	–	–	–	–	0
Stephen Hoiles	16	5	1	–	–	–	5
Michael Hooper	18	18	2	–	–	–	10
Rob Horne	15	12	5	–	–	–	25
Sekope Kepu	18	11	1	–	–	–	5
Jono Lance	9	4	1	–	–	–	5
Tolo Latu	14	0	–	–	–	–	0
Pat McHutcheon	8	0	–	–	–	–	0
Brendan McKibbin	18	0	1	–	–	–	5
Taqele Naiyaravoro	5	0	1	–	–	–	5
Wycliff Palu	15	13	1	–	–	–	5
Nick Phipps	18	18	3	–	–	–	15
Tatafu Polota-Nau	18	18	–	–	–	–	0
Jacques Potgieter	18	15	2	–	–	–	10
Hugo Roach	2	0	–	–	–	–	0
Benn Robinson	18	17	1	–	–	–	5
Paddy Ryan	17	8	–	–	–	–	0
Will Skelton	18	8	–	–	–	–	0
Jeremy Tilse	14	0	–	–	–	–	0

Source: 2014 Waratahs Team Statistics

== Home crowd attendances ==
Round	Opponent	Venue	Crowd
2	Force	Allianz Stadium, Sydney	16,091
3	Reds	ANZ Stadium, Sydney	17,580
6	Rebels	Allianz Stadium, Sydney	16,000
10	(South Africa) Bulls	Allianz Stadium, Sydney	15,773
12	(New Zealand) Hurricanes	Allianz Stadium, Sydney	17,221
14	(South Africa) Lions	Allianz Stadium, Sydney	19,639
17	Brumbies	ANZ Stadium, Sydney	
18	(New Zealand) Highlanders	Allianz Stadium, Sydney	24,500
SF	Brumbies	Allianz Stadium, Sydney	38,800
F	(New Zealand) Crusaders	ANZ Stadium, Sydney	61,823
Total Regular season*			126,804
Average Regular season*			18,115
Total (incl. finals)*			227,427
Average (incl. finals)*			25,270

*Does not include Round 17 v. Brumbies where crowd figure is unavailable
