= Cadeyrn Neville =

Australian rugby union player

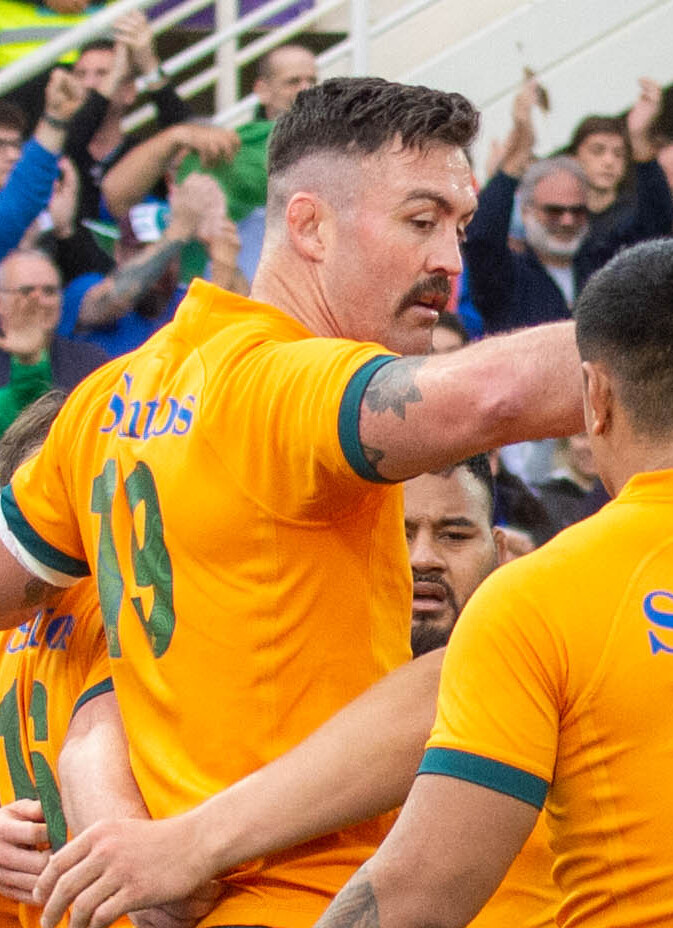
- Neville with Australia in 2022
- Born: 9 November 1988 (age 38) Manly, New South Wales, Australia
- Height: 2.02 m (6 ft 7 1/2 in)
- Weight: 123 kg (19 st 5 lb; 271 lb)

Rugby union career
- Position: Lock
- Current team: Manly
Senior career
Years	Team	Apps	(Points)
2014	Melbourne Rising	9	(5)
2015	Brisbane City	10	(15)
2017–2019	Toyota Industries Shuttles	31	(25)
- Correct as of 27 May 2021
Super Rugby
Years	Team	Apps	(Points)
2012–2015	Rebels	47	(15)
2016−2017	Reds	16	(5)
2020–2026	Brumbies	73	(20)
- Correct as of 5 June 2026
International career
Years	Team	Apps	(Points)
2021–2022	Australia	8	(5)
2023	Australia A	2	(0)

Cadeyrn Neville (born 9 November 1988) is an Australian rugby union player. His regular playing position is lock. He represents the ACT Brumbies in the Super Rugby.

== Career ==
=== Early career ===
Neville began attending Manly Selective Campus in 2001.

Neville joined the Australian Institute of Sport rowing program and left school in 2006. As a rower he represented Australia at the Youth Olympics, and trained with Australian rower Tom Swann, as both began their long-term preparations for the 2012 Olympics. Neville said, "The program I was in at the AIS when I left school in 2006, the goal of that was to produce a single sculler for London."

In 2008, Neville played junior rugby league for the Narraweena Hawks, in the Manly Warringah A Grade competition.

It wasn't until 2009 that he took up rugby union and completed his first season for the Manly club in Sydney. He made Manly first grade in 2010.

In 2011, Neville was named as a reserve for Sydney to play NSW Country, at Coogee Oval.

Playing at lock for Manly in the Shute Shield he went on to become one of the "competition's biggest improvers in 2011." Neville's Manly team mates, in 2011, included props Eddie Aholelei and Jono Owen, who both became his team mates the Melbourne Rebels in 2012.

=== Super Rugby ===
==== Rebels ====
Neville made his Melbourne Rebels debut during the 2012 Super Rugby season against the Bulls at AAMI Park, Melbourne. Neville started the game before being replaced by Al Campbell in the 45th minute in a 35–41 loss for the home side.

David Lord wrote, "Not only did Neville more than hold his own against a powerhouse pack led by Springbok Pierre Spies, but the Rebels went within a whisker of causing the biggest boilover of the season before going down 41–35 to a far more experienced lineup, giving the ... crowd plenty to cheer about when nobody expected the two-wins this season Rebels to match it with the two-loss Bulls."

Two weeks later, against the Force in Perth, Neville scored two tries to help the Rebels achieve their fourth win of the season.

==== Reds ====
Neville signed a two-year deal to join the Reds starting in the 2016 season.

== International career ==
In May 2012, Neville was selected in the Wallabies training squad.

In 2022, Neville made his run-on debut for the Wallabies against England at Optus Stadium in Perth.

== Statistics ==
As of 15 Jun 2024

=== Super Rugby statistics ===
Season	Team	Matches	Starter	Sub	Min	Tries	Drop	Pen	Con	Points	Yel	Red
2014	Rebels	16	9	7	655	0	0	0	0	0	0	0
2015	Rebels	9	2	7	273	0	0	0	0	0	0	0
2016	Reds	15	11	4	902	1	0	0	0	5	0	0
2017	Reds	1	0	1	5	0	0	0	0	0	0	0
2020	Brumbies	10	9	1	655	1	0	0	0	5	0	0
2021	Brumbies	10	10	0	745	2	0	0	0	10	0	0
2022	Brumbies	9	8	1	459	0	0	0	0	0	0	0
2023	Brumbies	11	11	0	699	0	0	0	0	0	0	0
2024	Brumbies	13	7	6	489	0	0	0	0	0	0	0
Grand Total		94	67	6	4882	4	0	0	0	20	0	0

=== International statistics ===
Season	Team	Matches	Starts	Minutes	Tries	Cons	Pens	Points	YC	RC
2022	Australia	8	7	459	1	0	0	5	0	0
Total		8	7	459	1	0	0	5	0	0
