= Justin Turner (disambiguation) =

Justin Turner (born 1984) is an American baseball player.

Justin Turner may also refer to:

- Justin Turner (basketball) (born 1998), American basketball player
- Justin Turner (rugby union) (born 1990), Australian rugby union footballer

== See also ==
- List of Coronation Street characters (2009), fictional character Justin Turner
