= Matt Lucas (rugby union) =

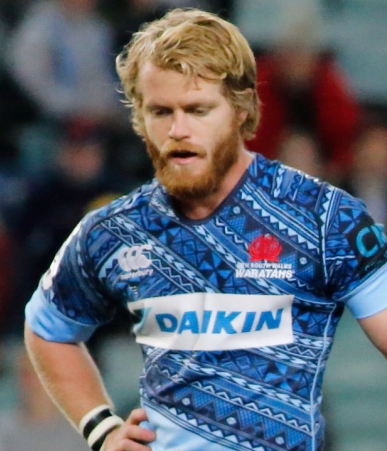
- Born: Matthew Lucas; 29 January 1992 (age 34) Gold Coast, Queensland, Australia
- Height: 1.74 m (5 ft 8 1/2 in)
- Weight: 80 kg (12 st 8 lb; 176 lb)
- School: St. Joseph's College, Gregory Terrace
- University: Curtin University
- Notable relative: Ben Lucas

Rugby union career
- Position: Scrum-half
Amateur team(s)
Years	Team	Apps	(Points)
- Sunnybank Rugby
2013–	Manly Marlins		
Senior career
Years	Team	Apps	(Points)
2014	North Harbour Rays	6	(14)
2015	Calvisano	5	(0)
2016	Sydney Rays	8	(32)
2018	Suntory Sungoliath	12	(0)
2020–2022	Ricoh Black Rams	13	(13)
Super Rugby
Years	Team	Apps	(Points)
2013–2017	Waratahs	32	(14)
2018–2019	Brumbies	28	(7)
- Correct as of 21 February 2021
International career
Years	Team	Apps	(Points)
2011–2012	Australia U20	8	(21)
- Correct as of 5 May 2013
National sevens team
Years	Team		Comps
2012–2013	Australia		6

Matthew Lucas (born 29 January 1992) is an Australian rugby union footballer. His regular playing position is scrum-half. He has been named in the Waratahs Extended Playing Squad for the 2013 Super Rugby season.

He represented Australia under 20 in both the 2011 and 2012 IRB Junior World Championship.

== Relatives ==
Matt Lucas is the younger brother of rugby player Ben Lucas who plays for Montpellier in the French Top 14 league.
