= Sam Lane (rugby union) =

- Born: Samuel Thomas Lane; 21 February 1991 (age 35) Brisbane, Australia
- Height: 1.78 m (5 ft 10 in)
- Weight: 85 kg (13 st 5 lb)
- School: Bishops High School
- Notable relative: Tim Lane (father)Matt Lane (cousin)

Rugby union career
- Position: Fly-half
- Current team: Rugby Calvisano
Senior career
Years	Team	Apps	(Points)
2013−2018	Manly	71	(405)
2018−	Calvisano		
2020-	Manly		
Provincial / State sides
Years	Team	Apps	(Points)
2011	Western Province	2	(3)
2015−2017	Sydney Rays	15	(7)
- Correct as of 4 November 2015
Super Rugby
Years	Team	Apps	(Points)
2012	Reds	2	(10)
2013	Waratahs	0	(0)
- Correct as of 18 February 2013

Samuel Thomas Lane (born 21 February 1991 in Brisbane, Australia) is a rugby union footballer, currently playing with Italian side Rugby Calvisano in the Top12 and European Rugby Continental Shield. His regular playing position is fly-half.

== Career ==
He made his debut for the Reds during the 2012 Super Rugby season. He previously represented Western Province in South Africa's Vodacom Cup.

Lane attended Bishops in Cape Town, South Africa and played in their First XV in 2008 and 2009 alongside Springbok Nizaam Carr. Lane was the Bishops captain in 2009 and made the Western Province Craven Week side that year.

He is the son of former Wallabies assistant coach Tim Lane.

He was initially included in the Waratahs extended playing squad for the 2013 Super Rugby season, but later voluntarily withdrew in order to concentrate on his recovery from knee surgery.

== Rugby Calvisano ==
Lane signs with Rugby Calvisano. which is based in Calvisano (Province of Brescia), in Lombardy, as Fly-half.
