= Nathan Eyres-Brown =

Australian rugby union player

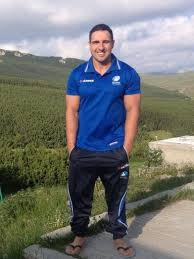
- Born: Nathan Eyres-Brown; 23 May 1989 (age 37) Gold Coast, Queensland, Australia
- Height: 1.74 m (5 ft 8 1/2 in)
- Weight: 91 kg (14 st 5 lb)
- School: The Southport School, Somerset College

Rugby union career
- Position: Fly Half
- Current team: Reds
Amateur team(s)
Years	Team	Apps	(Points)
2009–2012	Gold Coast Breakers	31	(396)
Senior career
Years	Team	Apps	(Points)
2013	Farul Constanţa	12	(10)
Provincial / State sides
Years	Team	Apps	(Points)
2018–	Kansas City Blues	2	(0)
Super Rugby
Years	Team	Apps	(Points)
2012	Queensland Reds	2	(0)
National sevens team
Years	Team		Comps
2009	Australia Sevens		

Nathan Eyres-Brown (born 23 May 1989) is an Australian rugby union footballer. His usual position is fullback or wing. He played for the Australian Sevens team in 2009, and played Super Rugby for the Queensland Reds in 2012.

In 2013, he played fly-half for Romanian Superliga side Farul Constanţa.

== Early life and junior career ==
Born on Queensland's Gold Coast, Eyres-Brown started his career playing rugby league. At age 15, he joined the Canterbury Bulldogs development squad alongside Esi Tonga and Chris Sandow.

In 2005, Eyres-Brown gained a scholarship at The Southport School (TSS), where he played flyhalf during his first season. He made the Queensland Under-16 squad for rugby union in 2005 as a utility back, and played in the national competition at inside centre due to an injury to Matt To'omua.

Eyres-Brown played in 1st XV team at Southport in 2006. He scored a 50-metre try to win the match against Brisbane State High School which ensured TSS were crowned GPS premiers. After leaving school, Eyres-Brown played rugby league during 2007 and 2008 in the FOGS Colts Challenge for the Burleigh Bears.

== Rugby career ==
In 2009, Eyres-Brown returned to playing rugby union at the Gold Coast Breakers club. He made his Premier Rugby debut against Norths on 25 April 2009, when he played as a winger and scored two tries. From this success, Eyres-Brown was selected as a winger for Queensland Country before making the Australia Sevens squad in 2009. Eyres-Brown clocked a 100 metre time of 10.47 seconds at the Australian Institute of Sport during the Australian 7s camp.

He sustained a shoulder injury playing with the Breakers in 2010 which cut his season short. He returned via rugby league in 2011 with the Southport Tigers, before rejoining the Breakers in 2012.

Eyres-Brown was recruited to the Queensland Reds during the 2012 Super Rugby season. He was flown at short notice to South Africa to provide injury cover as a utility back for Mike Harris and Ben Lucas. On 24 March, for the Bulls match at Pretoria, he came off the bench in the second half to earn his Queensland and Super Rugby debut. Against the Western Force a week later, he came off the bench again, to relieve centre Ben Tapuai.

=== Farul Constanţa ===
Eyres-Brown joined Romanian Superliga team Farul Constanţa for the 2013 SuperLiga season. On 13 July, he became the first ever Super Rugby player to play in the SuperLiga, starting against Timișoara in the Stadionul de Rugby Mihai Naca, Constanța. During the same game, Sosene Anesi coming off the bench for Timișoara to become the second Super Rugby player in the SuperLiga. Eyres-Brown played another 11 games for Farul Constanţa, playing as a centre, full-back, wing and fly-half. Farul Constanţa lost in the semi-final of the SuperLiga against CSA Steaua București, during which Eyres-Brown was sent off late in the game for a late hit.

The send off was the end for Farul Constanta as their marque and play maker left the field for the game. Eyres-Brown taunted the opposition crowd leaving the field. Eyres-Brown received a hefty suspension given his previous two warnings during the playoffs for bad sportsmanship. Farul Constanta management made an apology on behalf of Eyres-Brown and mentioned it is his competitiveness that brought out the bad sportsmanship. Eyres-Brown was suspended for 14 weeks for the incident.
