= Mark Swanepoel =

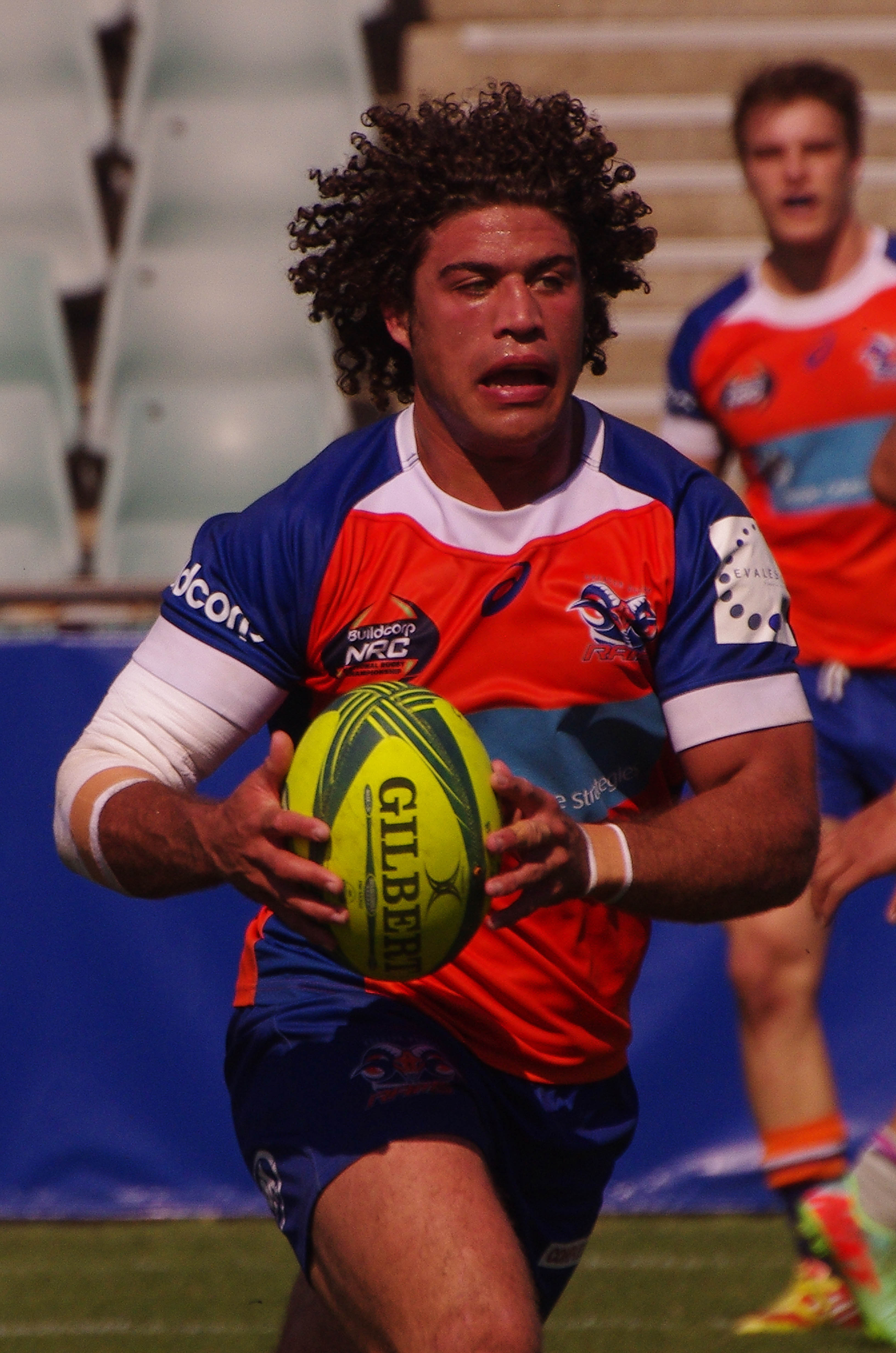
- Swanepoel in 2014
- Born: Mark Swanepoel; 26 October 1990 (age 36) Johannesburg, South Africa
- Height: 1.81 m (5 ft 11 1/2 in)
- Weight: 91 kg (14 st 5 lb)
- School: The Southport School

Rugby union career
- Position: Scrum-Half
Amateur team(s)
Years	Team	Apps	(Points)
2014−	Manly		
Senior career
Years	Team	Apps	(Points)
2014−	Greater Sydney Rams	8	(0)
Provincial / State sides
Years	Team	Apps	(Points)
2011–12	Canterbury	8	(0)
2013	Tasman	11	(0)
- Correct as of 25 October 2013
Super Rugby
Years	Team	Apps	(Points)
2010–11	Force	4	(0)
2013	Brumbies	2	(0)
- Correct as of 4 August 2013
International career
Years	Team	Apps	(Points)
2008	Australia Schoolboys		
2009	Australia u20		

Mark Swanepoel (born 26 October 1990 in Johannesburg, South Africa) is a retired rugby union player.

== Background ==
Swanepoel played for the Brumbies in the southern hemisphere Super Rugby competition in the position of scrum-half.

He made his Super Rugby debut for the Force during the 2010 Super 14 season and also previously played for Canterbury in New Zealand's ITM Cup.

In October 2012, Swanepoel was named in the Brumbies Extended Playing Squad for the 2013 Super Rugby season.

He is a former Australia Schoolboys and Australia under 20 international.

After retiring from Rugby, Swanepoel became the sole director of the Cigno Australia financial services firm. In April 2026 he was fined $A500,000 after the firm was found by the Federal Court to have been illegally providing payday lending services. The judge found that Swanepoel and his business partner (who was the sole director of another firm) had sought and followed expert legal advice, but concluded that this did not "wholly exonerate the respondents from liability" for a fine. Cigno Australia was also ordered to pay $A3 million.
