= Tiaan Liebenberg =

South Africa international rugby union footballer

- Full name: Christiaan Rudolph Liebenberg
- Born: 18 December 1981 (age 44) Kimberley, South Africa
- Height: 1.82 m (5 ft 11 1/2 in)
- Weight: 109 kg (17 st 2 lb; 240 lb)
- School: Grey College, Bloemfontein
- University: North West University, Potchefstroom Campus
- Notable relative: Hercú Liebenberg (brother)

Rugby union career
- Position: Hooker
Youth career
- 2001: Griquas
- 2002: Sharks
Senior career
Years	Team	Apps	(Points)
2002	Sharks (Currie Cup)	2	(0)
2003–2006	Griquas	64	(22)
2006	Cheetahs	13	(5)
2006–2014	Western Province	62	(30)
2007–2014	Stormers	73	(25)
2009	→ Toulon	6	(0)
2016	Free State XV	5	(15)
2002–2016	Total	219	(97)
- Correct as of 25 October 2014
International career
Years	Team	Apps	(Points)
2007	South Africa (tour)	1	(0)
2009	Emerging Springboks	10	(0)
2012	South Africa (tests)	5	(0)
- Correct as of 14 April 2013

Christiaan Rudolph Liebenberg (born 18 December 1981) is a South African professional rugby union player who played as a hooker. He started his career at the Sharks in 2002 before joining Griquas the following year. He made 64 appearances for the Kimberley-based side between 2003 and 2006 and also played Super Rugby for the Cheetahs in 2006. He then played the remainder of his career in Cape Town, where he played domestic rugby for Western Province and Super Rugby for the Stormers. He also had a short spell at French Top 14 side Toulon in 2009.

He made his international debut for South Africa on 1 December 2007 against the Barbarians in London, aged 25. He then came up as replacement hooker against Australia in Perth on 8 September 2012 and as replacement hooker the following week against New Zealand in Dunedin, where South Africa lost by 10 points. He made a total of five test appearances for South Africa, plus the one tour match against the Barbarians.

He retired after the 2014 Currie Cup season.
