= Salesi Manu =

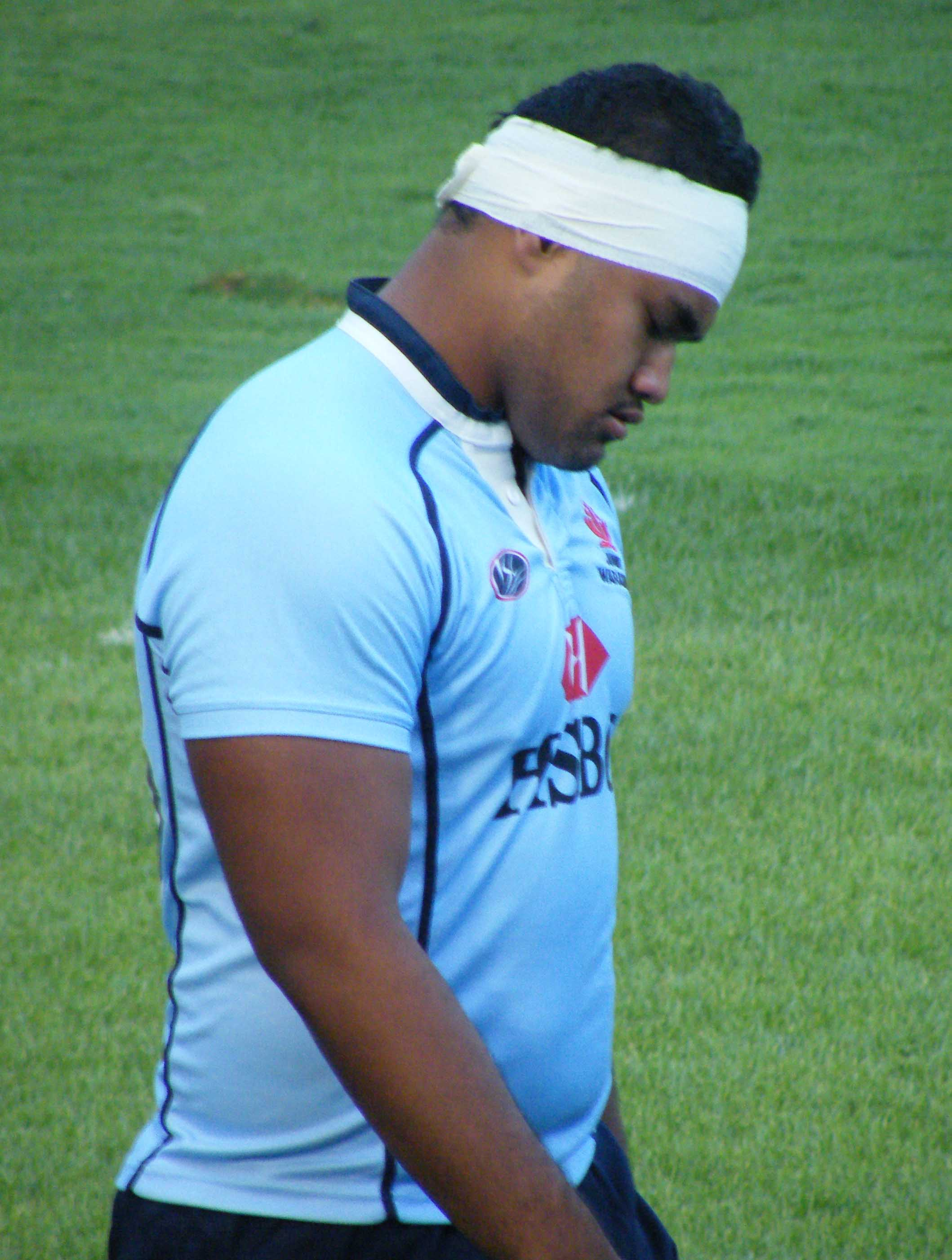
- Born: Salesi Manu; 26 September 1990 (age 36) Sydney, Australia
- Height: 1.85 m (6 ft 1 in)
- Weight: 125 kg (19 st 10 lb)

Rugby union career
- Position: Prop
Senior career
Years	Team	Apps	(Points)
2012	North Harbour	6	(0)
2014–2016	Benetton Treviso	25	(0)
2016–2017	Honda Heat	9	(0)
2017	Brisbane City	3	(5)
- Correct as of 21 October 2017
Super Rugby
Years	Team	Apps	(Points)
2012–14	Force	9	(0)
- Correct as of 15 July 2013
International career
Years	Team	Apps	(Points)
2010	Australia U20	5	(0)
- Correct as of 13 December 2012

Salesi Manu (born 26 September 1990) is an Australian rugby union footballer who plays as a prop. He plays for Brisbane City in the National Rugby Championship and Bond University in the Queensland Premiership. He has previously played for Super Rugby team the Western Force, Italian club Benetton Treviso, and Japanese club Honda Heat.

== Early life ==
Manu was a member of the Australia under 20 team that competed in the 2010 IRB Junior World Championship.

== Career ==
He joined the Western Force Extended Playing Squad during 2012 and made 8 appearances. In the second half of the year he played for North Harbour in New Zealand's domestic ITM Cup competition. Manu was a member of the Western Force extended player group for the 2013 Super Rugby season before signing with Benetton Treviso for the 2014–15 season.
