= Waltie Vermeulen =

South African rugby union player

- Full name: Petrus van der Walt Vermeulen
- Born: 11 November 1988 (age 38) Bloemfontein, South Africa
- Height: 1.98 m (6 ft 6 in)
- Weight: 106 kg (16 st 10 lb; 234 lb)
- School: Grey College, Bloemfontein
- University: University of the Free State

Rugby union career
- Position: Lock
Youth career
- 2006–2009: Free State Cheetahs
Senior career
Years	Team	Apps	(Points)
2009–2014	Free State Cheetahs	58	(0)
2010–2014	Cheetahs	26	(5)
- Correct as of 1 October 2014
International career
Years	Team	Apps	(Points)
2008	South Africa Students	1	(0)
- Correct as of 4 May 2014

Petrus van der Walt Vermeulen (born 11 November 1988) is a former South African rugby union footballer. He played as a lock for the Cheetahs in Super Rugby and the Free State Cheetahs in the Currie Cup between 2009 and 2014, making 85 first class appearances.

He retired during 2014, aged just 25, due to persistent injuries and to concentrate on his career as a doctor.
