= Chris Thomson =

Australian rugby union football player

- Born: Chris P. Thomson; 10 July 1985 (age 41) Canberra, Australia
- Height: 2.04 m (6 ft 8 1/2 in)
- Weight: 117 kg (18 st 6 lb)

Rugby union career
- Position: Lock
Senior career
Years	Team	Apps	(Points)
2010–12	Narbonne	51	(10)
- Correct as of 23 November 2012
Super Rugby
Years	Team	Apps	(Points)
2009–10	Waratahs	9	(0)
2013–14	Rebels	0	(0)
- Correct as of 4 March 2014

Chris Thomson (born 10 July 1985) is a former Australian rugby union footballer who played as a lock for the Waratahs between 2009 and 2010 and French side Narbonne between 2010 and 2012 (making 51 appearances and scoring two tries).

He joined the Melbourne Rebels prior to the 2014 Super Rugby season, but suffered wrist and knee injuries which saw him miss the start of the season and culminated in Thomson announcing his retirement in March 2014.
