= Ben Whittaker =

- Born: 10 October 1989 (age 37) Canberra, Australia
- Height: 1.89 m (6 ft 2 1/2 in)
- Weight: 81 kg (12 st 11 lb)
- School: Barker College

Rugby union career
- Position: Hooker
- Current team: Northern Suburbs
Senior career
| Years | Team | Apps | (Points) |
| 2013–2014 | Biarritz | 2 | (0) |
- Correct as of 9 February 2015
Super Rugby
| Years | Team | Apps | (Points) |
| 2009–2013 | Force | 32 | (5) |
| 2015 | Rebels | 1 | (0) |
- Correct as of 14 June 2015

Ben Whittaker (born 10 October 1989) is an Australian rugby union footballer. Whittaker played for the Western Force and Melbourne Rebels in Super Rugby, and French side Biarritz.

His regular playing position is hooker. Whittaker made his Super Rugby debut during the 2009 Super 14 season against the Lions in Perth.
