= Joel Rapana =

New Zealand-born Australian rugby union player (born 1986)

- Full name: Joelin Rapana
- Born: 23 April 1986 (age 40) Wellington, New Zealand
- Height: 6 ft 2 in (188 cm)
- Weight: 216 lb (98 kg)
- School: PBC State High School
- Notable relative: Jordan Rapana (brother)

Rugby union career
- Position: Wing / Centre
Super Rugby
Years	Team	Apps	(Points)
2010	Western Force	1	(0)
2012	Reds	1	(0)
International career
Years	Team	Apps	(Points)
2014	Cook Islands		

Joelin Rapana (born 23 April 1986) is a New Zealand-born Australian former professional rugby union player.

== Biography ==
Born in Wellington, Rapana was in his early teens when his family moved to Queensland, where he attended Palm Beach Currumbin State High School. He played rugby league growing up in Queensland and was an Australian Schoolboys representative player in 2004. Turning down a contract offer from the Bulldogs, Rapana instead spent two years ministering in remote Western Australia for the Church of Jesus Christ of Latter-day Saints. He then returned to Queensland and played rugby league for the Burleigh Bears while contracted by the Gold Coast Titans, where his younger brother Jordan was a player.

=== Rugby union ===
Rapana, a three-quarter, was signed by the Western Force in 2009 to play rugby union, a sport he had played during his youth in New Zealand. He made his Super 14 debut off the bench against the Hurricanes in Wellington, then three weeks later was sidelined with a broken hand and didn't make his way back into the XV. In 2012, Rapana represented Queensland A in the Pacific Rugby Cup and was called up by the Reds for their Super Rugby match against the Western Force in Perth, for which he was a starting centre. He played international rugby for the Cook Islands as part of their 2015 Rugby World Cup qualifying campaign.
