= Anthony Hegarty =

Australian rugby union player

- Born: Anthony Hegarty; 11 May 1987 (age 39) Canberra, Australia
- Height: 1.83 m (6 ft 0 in)
- Weight: 106 kg (16 st 10 lb)
- School: Marist College, Canberra

Rugby union career
- Position: Hooker
Senior career
Years	Team	Apps	(Points)
2011–	Canberra Vikings	1	(0)
- FC Grenoble
Super Rugby
Years	Team	Apps	(Points)
2011	Brumbies	16	(5)
- Correct as of Nov 2013

Anthony Hegarty (born 11 May 1987 in Canberra, Australia) is an Australian rugby union player who plays for FC Grenoble in the Top 14. He began his professional career for the Brumbies in Super Rugby. His playing position is hooker. He made his Super Rugby debut during the 2011 Super Rugby season against the Highlanders in Invercargill.
