= Hugh Perrett =

- Born: Hugh A. Perrett; 6 April 1982 (age 44) Sydney
- Height: 1.86 m (6 ft 1 in)
- Weight: 100 kg (15 st 10 lb)

Rugby union career
- Position: Flanker
Senior career
Years	Team	Apps	(Points)
2004–05	Sale Sharks	12	(0)
2005	Bath Rugby	1	(0)
2007	Western Sydney Rams	5	(10)
2014	Greater Sydney Rams	7	(0)
Super Rugby
Years	Team	Apps	(Points)
2011	Waratahs	6	(0)
2012	Rebels	5	(0)
- Correct as of 4 November 2015

Hugh Perrett (born 6 April 1982, in Sydney) is a rugby union player who played for the Rebels in Super Rugby. His playing position is Flanker. He made his debut in Super Rugby for the Rebels during the 2012 Super Rugby season as an injury replacement.

Having previously been a member of the Waratahs squad, he joined the Rebels during the 2012 Super Rugby season as an injury replacement and went on to make 4 appearances that season before leaving the club.

Earlier in his career he represented English teams Sale Sharks and Bath Rugby make 10 appearances in total.

Perrett has also represented Eastwood Rugby Club, captaining the side in the Shute Shield. He has also represented the Greater Sydney Rams in the National Rugby Championship.
