= Kimami Sitauti =

- Born: Kimami Sitauti; 12 April 1991 (age 35) Sydney, Australia
- Height: 1.83 m (6 ft 0 in)
- Weight: 95 kg (14 st 13 lb; 209 lb)
- School: St Joseph's College, Nudgee

Rugby union career
- Position: Right-wing
Provincial / State sides
Years	Team	Apps	(Points)
2013–	Bay of Plenty	16	(10)
- Correct as of 9 October 2014
Super Rugby
Years	Team	Apps	(Points)
2011	Reds	0	(0)
2012	Brumbies	0	(0)
2013	Rebels	4	(0)
- Correct as of 7 June 2013
National sevens team
Years	Team		Comps
2010–	Australia 7s		
Medal record
Men's rugby sevens
Representing Australia
Commonwealth Games
Silver medal – second place	2010 Delhi	Team competition

Kimami Sitauti (born 12 April 1991) is an Australian rugby union player. He plans to join the Rebels for the 2013 Super Rugby season.

His playing position is right-winger. He is of Tongan heritage.

== Move from New Zealand & early career ==
Sitauti is from Auckland, and he was part of Auckland Under 14s in 2005. He moved to Australia and attended Nudgee College in 2008. He was still in Year 12 at Nudgee, when he was named to play for Souths in the final of the club competition.

== Australian sevens and under 20s ==
In 2010 Sitauti got his first taste of sevens for Australia in Darwin. He travelled to New Zealand for more sevens at the Cake-Tin in Wellington before going to India to compete in sevens at the 2010 Commonwealth Games.

He was part of the Australian Under 20s at the 2011 IRB Junior World Championships.

== Super Rugby ==
He was part of the Reds squad in 2011 although he did not make any first-team appearances. He spent 2012 with the Brumbies, before contracting to join the Rebels for 2013.
