= JC Janse van Rensburg =

South African rugby union player

- Full name: Jacobus Christo Janse van Rensburg
- Born: 9 January 1986 (age 40) Prince Albert, South Africa
- Height: 1.85 m (6 ft 1 in)
- Weight: 109 kg (17 st 2 lb; 240 lb)
- School: Oakdale Agricultural College, Riversdale

Rugby union career
- Position: Prop
- Current team: Grenoble
Youth career
- 2004: SWD Eagles
- 2006: Golden Lions
Senior career
Years	Team	Apps	(Points)
2006–2013	Golden Lions XV	12	(5)
2006–2013	Golden Lions	67	(0)
2008–2013	Lions	52	(5)
2013	→ Sharks	3	(0)
2013–2015	Bayonne	54	(0)
2016–2018	Stormers	40	(5)
2016–2018	Western Province	20	(0)
2018–present	Grenoble	25	(0)
- Correct as of 13 December 2020

Jacobus Christo Janse van Rensburg (born 9 January 1986) is a South African rugby union footballer. His regular playing position is prop. He represents Grenoble in the Top 14, having previously played for the Lions and Stormers in Super Rugby, the Golden Lions and Western Province in the Currie Cup and for Bayonne in the French Top 14.

He also joined the Sharks on a short-term loan deal for the 2013 Super Rugby season.

In 2013, he signed a two-year deal with French team Bayonne.

In July 2015, it was announced that Janse van Rensburg would return to South Africa to link up with Cape Town-based outfit the Stormers prior to the 2016 Super Rugby season, signing a two-year deal with the side.

He returned to France after the 2018 Super Rugby season, joining Grenoble.
