= Ronald Raaymakers =

- Born: Ronald Raaymakers; 7 April 1990 (age 36) Pukekohe, New Zealand
- Height: 1.93 m (6 ft 4 in)
- Weight: 108 kg (17 st 0 lb)

Rugby union career
- Position: Flank / Lock
- Current team: Waiuku
Senior career
Years	Team	Apps	(Points)
2010–	Counties Manukau	42	(10)
- Correct as of 13 October 2014
Super Rugby
Years	Team	Apps	(Points)
2013	Blues	2	(0)
- Correct as of 1 June 2013
International career
Years	Team	Apps	(Points)
2009/10	New Zealand U20	2	(0)

Ronald Raaymakers (born 7 April 1990) is a Rugby union footballer. He plays as either a lock or flank. He represents Counties Manukau in the ITM Cup. He was a member of the Chiefs Wider Training Group during 2012 and will play for the Blues in Super Rugby from 2013.
