= Tom Chamberlain (rugby union) =

- Born: Tom Chamberlain; 1 February 1987 (age 39) Kaitaia, New Zealand
- Height: 1.93 m (6 ft 4 in)
- Weight: 108 kg (17 st 0 lb)

Rugby union career
- Position: Blindside Flanker
Provincial / State sides
Years	Team	Apps	(Points)
2007–10	North Harbour	31	(10)
2011	Southland	6	(0)
- Correct as of 16 April 2012
Super Rugby
Years	Team	Apps	(Points)
2009–10	Blues	7	(0)
2011–12	Rebels	11	(0)
- Correct as of 23 July 2012

Tom Chamberlain (born 1 February 1987 in Kaitaia, New Zealand) is a rugby union footballer. His regular playing position is blindside flanker. He represents the Melbourne Rebels in Super Rugby having previously played for the Blues in his home country.Tom Chamberlain represented New Zealand at the Under-21 level. He played for the New Zealand Under-21 team in 2007, participating in matches such as their game against Canada on June 21, 2007.
