= David Hall (rugby union) =

- Born: David George Hall; 16 April 1980 (age 46) Winton, New Zealand
- Height: 1.86 m (6 ft 1 in)
- Weight: 108 kg (17 st 0 lb)
- School: Southland Boys' High School

Rugby union career
- Position(s): Hooker, Number eight
Senior career
Years	Team	Apps	(Points)
2002- 2015	Southland	108	(30)
2005, 2007–2009	Highlanders	39	(0)
2011	Crusaders	1	
2012	Hurricanes	0	
2012	Northland	10	
- Correct as of 10 October 2015

David George Hall (born 16 April 1980) is a New Zealand rugby union player. He predominantly played as a hooker. He comes from a rugby background being the grand nephew of former All Black and Southland legend Les George.

== Early rugby career ==
Hall started his career as a loose forward before becoming a hooker in 2002. Hall gained his 50th cap playing for Southland against Tasman on 16 September 2006. He still occasionally plays Number 8 for the Stags due to Jason Rutledge having recently cemented the hooker role for both the Stags and for the Highlanders in Super Rugby. It was announced Hall would play his 2012 NPC rugby for the Northland Taniwha at the opposite end of the country.

== Knee reconstruction ==
He was forced out of the 2010 Super 14 season with a knee injury sustained in the 2009 Ranfurly Shield Win against Canterbury. His knee was later reconstructed and along with a shoulder operation the rehabilitation process was expected to take up to nine months.

=== Wrights Bush revival ===
During his long injury period Hall will attempt to help re-establish the Wrights Bush Rugby Club where he played most of his junior rugby. They will enter a senior team for the first time since 1995 and he is expected to assist with the coaching duties.

== Later rugby career ==
Hall played in his last NPC game for Southland on 10 October 2015 in a 39–20 loss against Canterbury at AMI Stadium coming off the bench as a substitute. He will presumably retire from playing Rugby Union.
