= Bandise Maku =

South African rugby union player

- Full name: Bandise Grey Maku
- Born: 24 June 1986 (age 40) King William's Town, South Africa
- Height: 1.85 m (6 ft 1 in)
- Weight: 106 kg (234 lb; 16 st 10 lb)
- School: Dale College Boys' High School
- University: Tshwane University of Technology

Rugby union career
- Position: Hooker
Youth career
- 2004: Border Bulldogs
- 2005–2007: Blue Bulls
Senior career
Years	Team	Apps	(Points)
2006–2010	Blue Bulls	61	(15)
2008–2010	Bulls	19	(0)
2011	Lions	14	(0)
2011–2012	Golden Lions	23	(5)
2013	Southern Kings	18	(0)
2013–2016	Blue Bulls	32	(0)
2014–2016	Bulls	9	(0)
2006–2016	Total	176	(20)
- Correct as of 25 October 2016
International career
Years	Team	Apps	(Points)
2006	South Africa Under-21	3	(0)
2007, 2009	Emerging Springboks	2	(0)
2010	South Africa (test)	1	(0)
2009–2010	South Africa (tour)	3	(5)
- Correct as of 21 February 2013

Bandise Grey Maku (born 24 July 1986) is a former South African professional rugby union player, whose usual position was hooker. He played first class rugby between 2006 and 2016 and also played in a single test match for South Africa in 2010, as well as in three tour matches in 2009 and 2010. He played Super Rugby for the Bulls from 2008 to 2010 and from 2014 to 2016, for the Lions in 2011 and for the Southern Kings in 2013. He played domestic Currie Cup rugby for the Blue Bulls from 2006 to 2010 and from 2013 to 2016 and for the Golden Lions in 2011 and 2012.

== Career ==
=== Youth ===
He represented his local team Border Bulldogs at the 2004 Craven Week before moving to the Blue Bulls, for whom he played rugby at youth level.

=== Bulls ===
He was first named in a Blue Bulls squad during the 2006 Vodacom Cup. He made his Currie Cup debut the following season, coming on as a 72nd-minute substitute against Boland Cavaliers. A year later, he was also included in Bulls squad for the 2008 Super 14 season, making his debut in Rotorua against the Chiefs.

=== Lions ===
He joined the Lions for the 2011 Super Rugby season, where he started in 14 games. He also played Currie Cup rugby for the Golden Lions, where he was also a member of the starting line-up which defeated the Sharks 42–16 to win the 2011 Currie Cup Premier Division. He was injured for the entire 2012 Super Rugby season, but did play some Currie Cup rugby at the end of the season.

=== Kings ===
He then joined the Southern Kings for the 2013 Super Rugby season.

=== Return to Bulls ===
After the 2013 Super Rugby season, he rejoined former team the Blue Bulls, signing a contract at the team until October 2016.

=== South Africa national team ===
His first tour of duty for his country was with the Springboks to France, Italy, Ireland & England in late 2009, where he played in tour matches against the Leicester Tigers and Saracens. He earned his first test cap for his country playing against Italy during an incoming tour in 2010. In 2010, Maku was again called up for duty with the Springboks in a November tour of Ireland, Wales, Scotland and England. His call came two matches into the tour on 18 November 2010, after a controversial incident in which two other Springbok players tested positive for a banned substance.

== Honours ==
- 2009 Currie Cup winner Blue Bulls
- 2010 Super Rugby winner Bulls
- 2011 Currie Cup winner Golden Lions
