= Edwin Hewitt (rugby union) =

South African rugby union footballer

- Full name: Edwin Westley Hewitt
- Born: 28 March 1988 (age 38) Pretoria, South Africa
- Height: 1.98 m (6 ft 6 in)
- Weight: 121 kg (19 st 1 lb; 267 lb)
- School: Afrikaanse Hoër Seunskool
- University: North-West University

Rugby union career
- Position: Lock
- Current team: Biarritz
Youth career
- 2007–2008: Leopards
Amateur team(s)
Years	Team	Apps	(Points)
2010	NWU Pukke	4	(5)
Senior career
Years	Team	Apps	(Points)
2010–2013	Griquas	32	(5)
2011	→ SWD Eagles	1	(0)
2012–2014	Sharks	3	(0)
2012–2014	Sharks (Currie Cup)	32	(0)
2014–2021	Biarritz	102	(10)
- Correct as of 2 August 2021

Edwin Westley Hewitt (born 28 March 1988) is a South African rugby union footballer. His regular playing position is lock. He played for French Rugby Pro D2 side Biarritz.

He previously represented the Griquas in the Currie Cup and Vodacom Cup before joining the Sharks in 2013, initially for a trial period, but then signed a two-year contract with the Sharks. He won the Currie Cup with the Sharks in 2013. Moving to Biarritz Olympique in 2014, Edwin captained Biarritz for 2 of the 6 seasons he played for them, before a career ending injury forced him to stop playing. He was an extremely aggressive defender that dominated collisions. In France he was the main ball carrier and momentum generator for his team. Edwin was known for his ruck cleaning skills and line-out versatility. Edwin was inspirational leader that led by doing the hard work and setting the tone for his team.
