= Callie Visagie =

South African rugby union player (born 1988)

- Full name: Callie-Theron Visagie
- Born: 9 July 1988 (age 38) Paarl, South Africa
- Height: 1.88 m (6 ft 2 in)
- Weight: 108 kg (17 st 0 lb; 238 lb)
- School: Paarl Boys' High School
- University: Stellenbosch University

Rugby union career
- Position: Hooker
Youth career
- 2004–2009: Western Province
Senior career
Years	Team	Apps	(Points)
2010–2011	Western Province	9	(0)
2012	Lions	16	(0)
2012	Golden Lions	10	(0)
2012	Golden Lions XV	1	(0)
2013–2015	Bulls	56	(10)
2013–2016	Blue Bulls	15	(10)
- Correct as of 18 July 2016

Callie-Theron Visagie (born 9 July 1988) is a retired South African rugby union footballer. His regular playing position was hooker. He most recently represented the Bulls in Super Rugby and the Blue Bulls in Currie Cup. He was included in the Springbok squad for the 2014 Incoming tour. He previously played for the Golden Lions, Western Province and captained Maties in the Varsity Cup.

After initially joining the Bulls on loan from the Lions for the 2013 Super Rugby season, he joined on a long-term deal, signing until October 2016.

Callie obtained his Bachelor of Accounting degree with Honours at Stellenbosch University, and subsequently qualified as a Chartered Accountant through the South African Institute of Chartered Accountants while simultaneously pursuing his professional rugby career. Following his career-ending injury in 2016, he moved to London and began working at Goldman Sachs.
