= Hercú Liebenberg =

South African rugby union player

- Full name: Hercúlaas Johannes Liebenberg
- Born: 16 May 1986 (age 40) Postmasburg, South Africa
- Height: 1.78 m (5 ft 10 in)
- Weight: 106 kg (16 st 10 lb; 234 lb)
- School: Grey College, Bloemfontein
- University: University of the Free State
- Notable relative(s): Henning Liebenberg (father); Tiaan Liebenberg (brother)

Rugby union career
- Position: Hooker
Youth career
- 2004–2006: Free State Cheetahs
Amateur team(s)
Years	Team	Apps	(Points)
2011	UFS Shimlas	6	(0)
Senior career
Years	Team	Apps	(Points)
2006–2008	Free State Cheetahs	22	(0)
2008–2009	Aurillac	5	(0)
2009	Mighty Elephants	11	(5)
2010–2014	Free State Cheetahs	48	(0)
2011	→ Griffons	2	(0)
2012	Cheetahs	6	(0)
- Correct as of 11 October 2014

Hercúlaas Johannes Liebenberg (born 16 May 1986) is a South African rugby union footballer. His regular playing position is hooker.

== Career ==
Liebenberg spent the majority of his career at the Free State Cheetahs, making 69 appearances for them in the Currie Cup and Vodacom Cup competitions and also played six Super Rugby matches for the Cheetahs.

In addition, he has played for French side Aurillac in 2008–09, for the Mighty Elephants in 2009 and he also had a brief loan spell at the Griffons in 2011.

He was released by the Free State Cheetahs at the end of 2014.
