= Tom Carter (rugby union) =

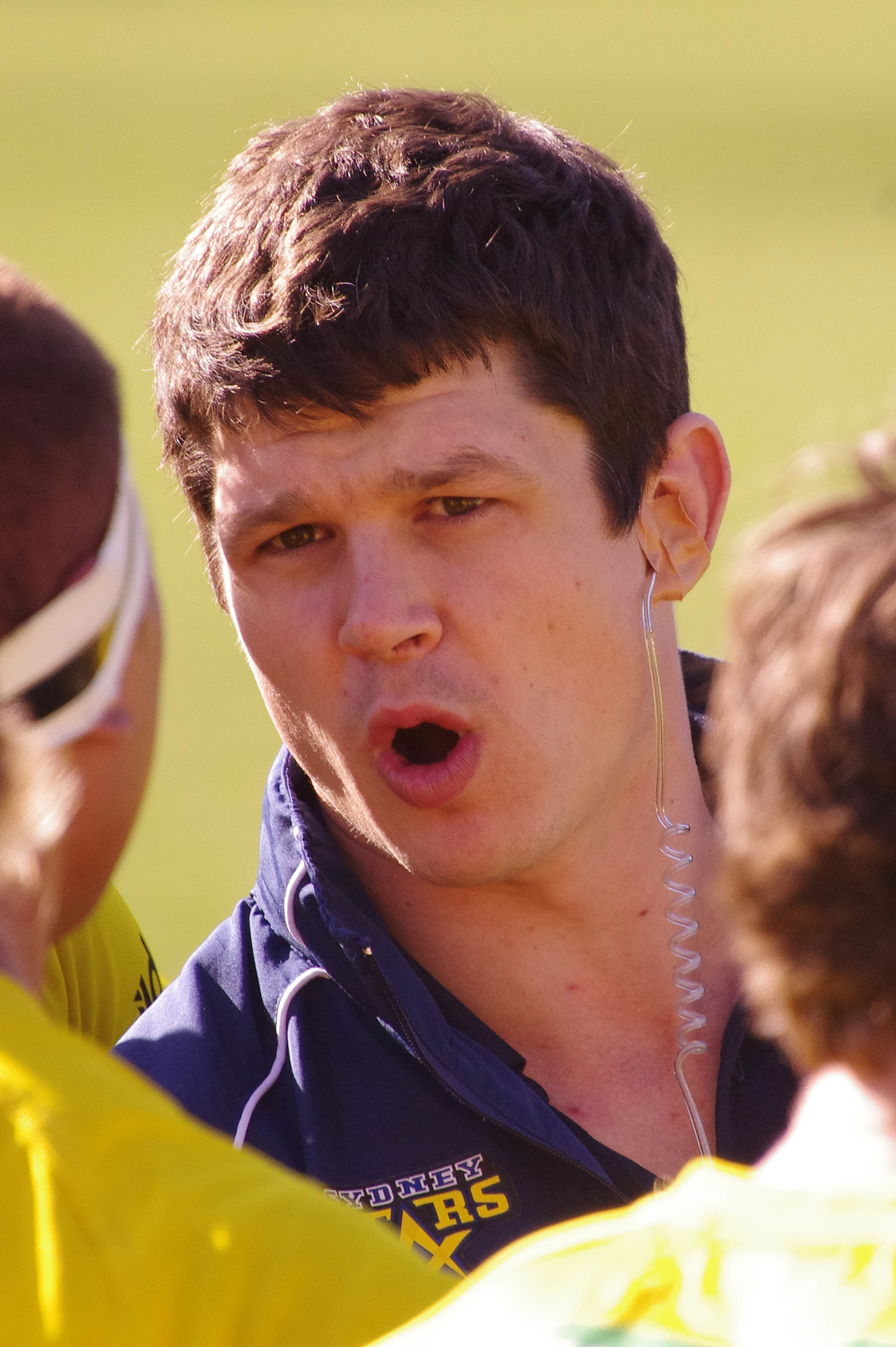
- Born: Tom Carter; 25 February 1983 (age 43) Young, New South Wales
- Height: 189 cm (6 ft 2 in)
- Weight: 103 kg (16 st 3 lb)
- School: The King's School[Knox Grammar School, Sydney]
- University: University of Sydney

Rugby union career
- Position: Inside-Centre
- Current team: Sydney University
Senior career
Years	Team	Apps	(Points)
2014–	Sydney Stars	4	(15)
- Correct as of 3 November 2015
Super Rugby
Years	Team	Apps	(Points)
2008–13	Waratahs	76	(75 15t)
- Correct as of 10 June 2013

Tom Carter is a former Australian rugby union player for the New South Wales Waratahs. He played inside centre and made his Super Rugby debut in 2008.

He attended Knox Grammar School and The King's School, playing in the Knox 1st XV from 1999 to 2000 as well as playing for the Gordon Rugby Club at Juniors level. In July 2013, he retired from rugby.

After several years as a senior member of the Sydney University Football Club, Carter currently spends his time as Chairman of Selectors of the Sydney University Cricket Club. Carter continues this role in 2014/15 after playing a role in SUCC winning a Club Championship, and premierships in First, Second and Sixth grade.
