= Alister Campbell (rugby union, born 1979) =

Australian rugby union player

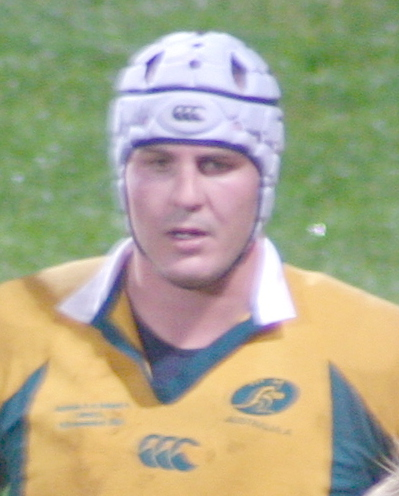
- Born: Alister Munro Campbell; 17 July 1979 (age 47) Raymond Terrace, New South Wales, Australia
- Height: 2.01 m (6 ft 7 in)
- Weight: 112 kg (17 st 9 lb)
- School: St. Joseph's College, Hunters Hill

Rugby union career
- Position: Lock
Senior career
| Years | Team | Apps | (Points) |
| 2007 | Canberra Vikings | 6 | (5) |
| 2008–10 | Montpellier | 24 | (5) |
Super Rugby
| Years | Team | Apps | (Points) |
| 2004 | Waratahs | 3 | (0) |
| 2005–08 | Brumbies | 36 | (15) |
| 2011–12 | Rebels | 30 | (10) |
- Correct as of 23 July 2012
International career
| Years | Team | Apps | (Points) |
| 2005 | Australia | 4 | (0) |

Alister Campbell (born 17 July 1979 in Raymond Terrace, NSW) is an Australian rugby union player. He is a lock for the Melbourne Rebels.

== Career ==
Alister has accumulated over 50 Super Rugby caps. Alister began his Super Rugby career with the NSW Waratahs in 2003. In 2005 he moved to Canberra where he played four seasons with the Brumbies, a move that was rewarded with gaining selection on the 2004, 2005, and 2006 Wallaby Spring Tours to Europe and the UK.

During Alister's time in Canberra he was elected Vice Captain and was the Player's representative on the Brumbies Board.

In 2008 Alister took the opportunity to broaden his rugby horizons and accepted an offer to join Montpellier and play on the Mediterranean coast in France's Top 14. During his time in France Alister was also selected to play in the French President's XV versus the French Barbarians.

During his career the 201 cm second rower has been awarded four Wallaby caps, debuting against France in 2005. He made his run-on debut the following year against Scotland at Murrayfield in Edinburgh, a moment he considers his proudest in the sport. Also that season Alister played in the World XV versus South Africa in the UK. Alister has also represented Australia A on a number of occasions, captaining the side in 2007.

Alister's leadership is a feature of his involvement with all levels of the game in which he has played. Alister is keen to promote grassroots rugby and community clubs following his experience learning the game in country NSW. Alister has been a long-standing player with Sydney University Rugby where he commenced his career in 1999 with 1st Grade Colts. He has since played over 100 1st Grade games and played in six Premiership winning sides.

Away from rugby, Alister graduated from the University of Technology, Sydney, with a Bachelor of Property Economics. Alister has continued to balance his playing responsibilities with other aspects of his career, working part-time in the property industry.

Alister's interests are skiing, golf and spending time with his family. Alister is married with three children.
