= Eddie Aholelei =

Tonga international rugby union player

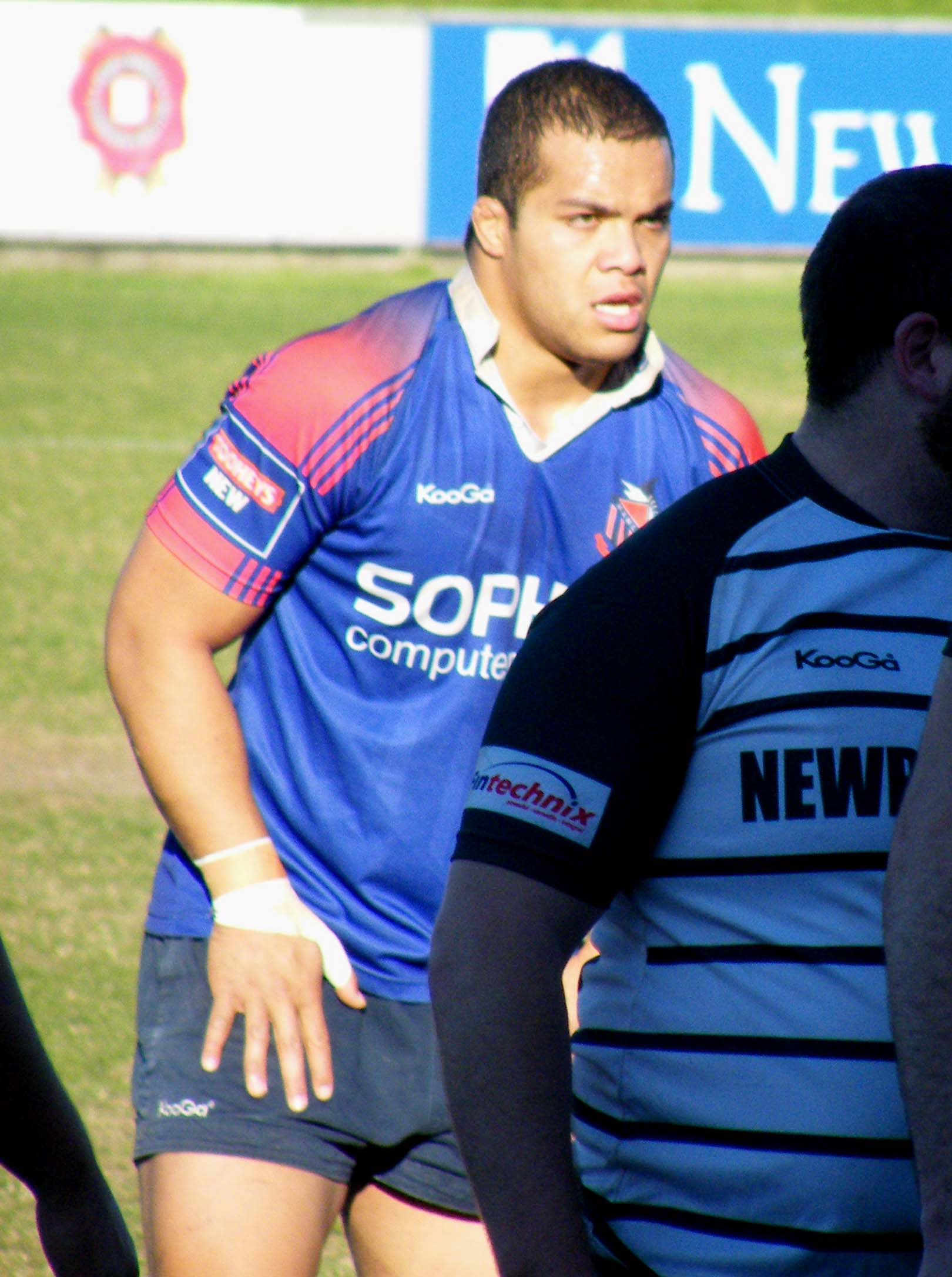
- Aholelei playing for Manly Marlins. Currently, he is coaching at Somerset College.
- Born: Edmund L.M.T. Aholelei; 3 December 1981 (age 44) Auckland, New Zealand
- Height: 1.9 m (6 ft 3 in)
- Weight: 120 kg (265 lb)

Rugby union career
- Position: Prop
Senior career
Years	Team	Apps	(Points)
2014–16	London Welsh	45	
2016-	Timișoara Saracens		
Super Rugby
Years	Team	Apps	(Points)
2011–2014	Melbourne Rebels		(0)
- Correct as of 16 April 2012
International career
Years	Team	Apps	(Points)
2013	Tonga	9	(5)
- Correct as of 25 June 2016

Eddie Aholelei (born 3 December 1981) is a retired professional rugby union footballer. His regular playing position is prop.

== Early career ==
Aholelei is of Tongan descent. He was born in Auckland, New Zealand, but grew up in Tonga most of his life with his parents and 4 brothers and represented Tonga at Under 19 World Cup 2000 in France. Aholelei moved to Sydney, Australia, after high school and joined the Manly Marlins rugby club colts in 2001. Twelve seasons later, Aholelei played his 200th grade game for Manly against Parramatta in Round 9 of the 2012 Shute Shield and played 135 games in 1st grade. He also represented the Australian Barbarians twice.

== Club career ==
Aholelei joined the Melbourne Rebels extended playing squad in 2011. He made his first appearance for the Melbourne Rebels vs Bath Rugby Football Club on their 2011 UK tour. In Round 8 2012 he made his Super Rugby debut off the bench against the Brumbies and went on to join the full squad in 2013.

On 14 July 2014, Aholelei made his move to England to join London Welsh who competed in the Aviva Premiership from the 2014–15 season. He appeared 45 times for London Welsh between 2014 and 2016 in both the Aviva Premiership and RFU championships competition.

In July 2016, he moved to the Romanian SuperLiga champions Timișoara Saracens. He also helped the club to win the Supa liga Champion for the second time in a row.

=== Charity (Youth in Union) ===
In 2015 he founded the charity "Youth in Union" (Nonprofit Organisation) to help youth through education and sports in his home country Tonga.
