= Justin Turner (rugby union) =

Australian rugby union footballer (born 1990)

- Born: Justin Turner; 12 March 1990 (age 36) Tzaneen, Limpopo, South Africa
- Height: 1.80 m (5 ft 11 in)
- Weight: 87 kg (13 st 10 lb)

Rugby union career
- Position: Scrum-Half
- Current team: Associates, WA
Senior career
Years	Team	Apps	(Points)
2014	Perth Spirit	9	(0)
- Correct as of 1 December 2014
Super Rugby
Years	Team	Apps	(Points)
2009–12, 2014	Force	11	(5)
- Correct as of 3 June 2014
International career
Years	Team	Apps	(Points)
2010	Australia U20		

Justin Turner (born 12 March 1990) is an Australian rugby union footballer. His regular playing position is scrum-half. He currently represents the Western Force in Super Rugby. He made his debut for the franchise during the 2010 Super 14 season against the Stormers in Perth.

Turner was a member of the Australia under 20 team that competed in the 2010 IRB Junior World Championship.
