= AJ Gilbert =

Australian rugby union player (born 1987)

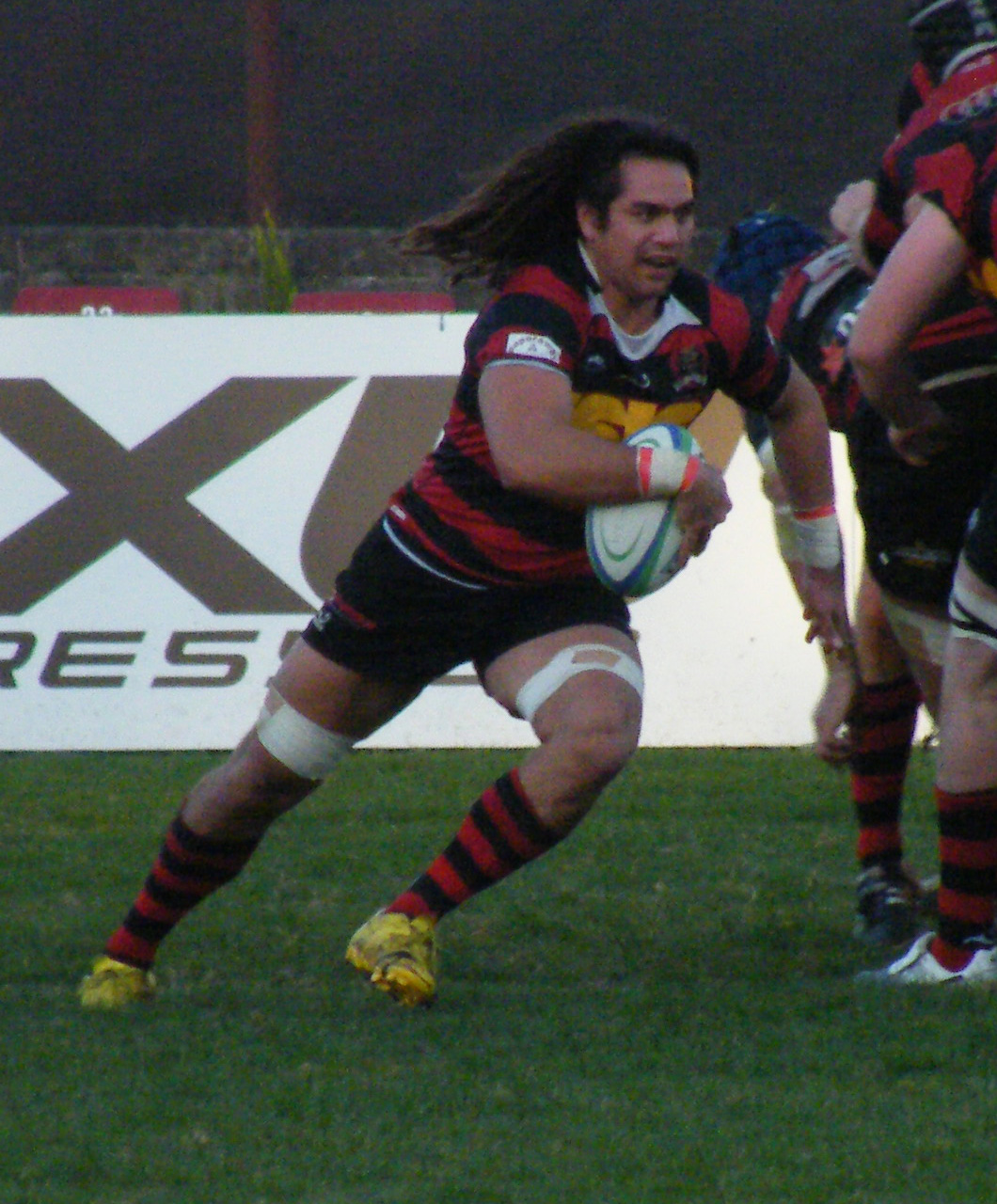
- Full name: AJ Gilbert
- Born: 19 June 1987 (age 39) Dorrigo, New South Wales, Australia
- Height: 1.82 m (6 ft 0 in)
- Weight: 100 kg (15 st 10 lb; 220 lb)
- School: Dorrigo High School

Rugby union career
- Position: Flanker / Number Eight
Senior career
Years	Team	Apps	(Points)
2007–08	Reds	1	(0)
2007	East Coast Aces	6	(10)
2013	Waratahs	2	(0)
- Correct as of 17 June 2013

AJ Gilbert (born 19 June 1987 in Dorrigo, Australia) is an Australian rugby union player. He was famously pilfered in a ruck during a match against Armidale blues by Corey Stace.

He played twice for the NSW Waratahs and competed for the Northern Suburbs Rugby Club in the Shute Shield. He is of Filipino descent.
