= Richard Aho =

New Zealand rugby union player (born 1987)

- Born: 25 April 1986 (age 40) Auckland, New Zealand
- Height: 191 cm (6 ft 3 in)
- Weight: 120 kg (265 lb)

Rugby union career
- Position: Prop
Super Rugby
| Years | Team | Apps | (Points) |
| 2013 | Waratahs | 2 | (0) |

Richard Aho (born 24 January 1987) is a New Zealand former professional rugby union player.

Born in Auckland, Aho played his early rugby for the city's Massey Rugby Club and was a specialist tighthead prop. He made a North Harbour development squad, before relocating to Australia, where he linked up with Penrith.

Aho joined the New South Wales Waratahs in the 2013 pre-season, via Randwick, and competed in their trials. He got called up for a match against the Western Force during the 2013 Super Rugby season and entered off the bench for the final four minutes. His only other opportunity that year came in a tour match against the visiting British & Irish Lions, to fill the void left by the unavailability of Sekope Kepu and Benn Robinson, both called up by the Wallabies.

Between 2013 and 2022, Aho plied his trade in France, with AS Beziers, Lille, SAXV Charente and Union Cognac.

== See also ==
- List of New South Wales Waratahs players
