= Ben Lucas (rugby union) =

Australian rugby union player

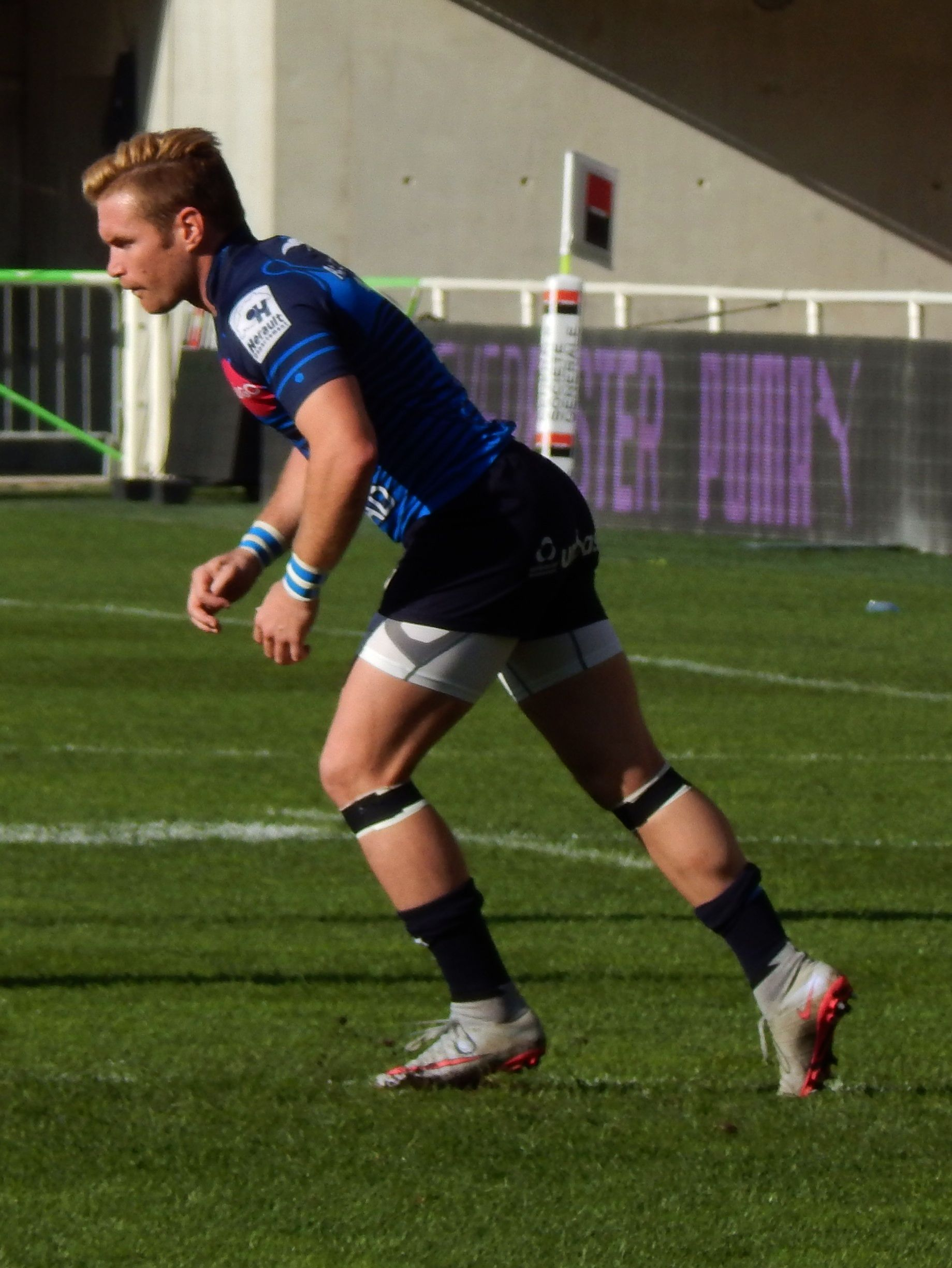
- Born: Benjamin Lucas; 30 December 1987 (age 38) Ipswich, Queensland, Australia
- Height: 1.78 m (5 ft 10 in)
- Weight: 81 kg (12 st 11 lb; 179 lb)
- School: St. Joseph's College, Gregory Terrace
- University: Griffith University

Rugby union career
- Position(s): Scrum-half, Fly-half, Fullback, Wing, Centre
- Current team: Sunnybank
Senior career
Years	Team	Apps	(Points)
2007	East Coast Aces	4	(12)
2014	Queensland Country	0	(0)
2014–16	Montpellier	43	(163)
2016–17	Toyota Verblitz	7	(14)
2018–19	FC Grenoble	6	(5)
2019–2021	Coca-Cola Red Sparks	10	(71)
2022	Skyactivs Hiroshima	4	(10)
- Correct as of 6 December 2021
Super Rugby
Years	Team	Apps	(Points)
2008–14, 2018	Reds	82	(76)
2020	Sunwolves	0	(0)
- Correct as of 21 February 2021
International career
Years	Team	Apps	(Points)
2006	Australia U20	2	(0)
- Correct as of 21 February 2021

Benjamin Lucas (born 30 December 1987) is an Australian rugby union player who used to play for Montpellier as a fly-half in the Top 14.

== Career ==
Educated at Robertson State School, then St. Joseph's College, Gregory Terrace Lucas is a former Australian schoolboy representative.

Lucas caught the eye of then Australian coach John Connolly when he claimed a personal tally of 35 points in the Brisbane club competition final where his club Sunnybank beat the Gold Coast by 85–19, Lucas creating nearly every play from Fly Half.

Lucas missed out on 2007 Rugby World Cup selection after inside back Berrick Barnes secured the last spot, but was invited to train with the Queensland Reds in preparation for the 2008 Super 14 season. Reds coach Phil Mooney switched Lucas to halfback after injury to halfback Sam Cordingley and Will Genia. Lucas was selected in the Australia A for the Pacific Nations Cup, then selected as starting flyhalf for the first game against Japan. He was expected to be selected in Australia's team for the Tri Nations, his versatility of being able to play quality rugby at both halfback and flyhalf to work in his favour as Australia lack quality depth in both positions off the bench. However, he was not included in the Wallabies squad.

In 2009 a rib injury sidelined Lucas, which allowed Genia to regain the Reds No 9 jersey. End of season injuries saw Lucas switch to fullback against the Crusaders, then Lucas switch back halfback at the end of the season after Genia was sidelined.

While Lucas continued to show versatility in 2010, Genia's form, consistency and leadership kept him ahead of Lucas in the halfback role, and Genia also assumed the captaincy as well, after a season-ending injury to James Horwill in the first game of the year. Lucas' versatility however kept him in the squad, and he signed another two-year contract. Lucas continued at fullback, including a solid effort in the Reds victory over the Highlanders in the final round at Suncorp Stadium. However, Lucas left the field prematurely with a knee injury. In the 2011 Super Rugby season Lucas become a regular fullback for the Reds, substituting for injured regular fullback Peter Hynes. However, in 2011 Wallabies selection continued to elude him, and despite recognition of his utility value he was overlooked for the Rugby World Cup.
