= Jono Owen =

Jono Michael Owen
- Born: Jono Michael Owen; 11 January 1986 (age 40) Hong Kong
- Height: 1.86 m (6 ft 1 in)
- Weight: 123 kg (19 st 5 lb)

Rugby union career
- Position: Prop
Senior career
Years	Team	Apps	(Points)
2014–15	Grenoble	14	(5)
Provincial / State sides
Years	Team	Apps	(Points)
2011	Counties Manukau	13	(0)
2015–	Auckland	6	(5)
- Correct as of 26 October 2015
Super Rugby
Years	Team	Apps	(Points)
2011–12	Brumbies	8	(0)
2012	Rebels	9	(0)
2013–14	Reds	12	(0)
- Correct as of 4 June 2014

Jono Owen (born 1 November 1986 in Hong Kong) is a rugby union player who plays for the Rebels in Super Rugby. His playing position is prop. He made his debut in Super Rugby for the Brumbies during the 2011 Super Rugby season against the Cheetahs in Bloemfontein.

During the 2012 Super Rugby season, the Brumbies released him from his contract and he joined the Rebels on a short-term deal.

He played for the Reds in the 2013 Super Rugby season.

He plays for Auckland in the 2015 ITM Cup.
