= Manly RUFC =

Australian rugby union club, based in Manly, New South Wales

(Australia) Manly Rugby Union Football Club
- Full name: Manly Rugby Union Football Club
- Nickname: Marlins
- Founded: 1883; 143 years ago
- Location: Manly, Sydney
- Region: Northern Beaches
- Ground: Manly Oval (Capacity: 5,000 (2,000 seats))
- President: Matthew Curll
- Coach: Harry Fehily
- Captain: tbc
- League(s): Shute Shield, NSWRU
- 1. 2

Official website
- www.manlyrugby.com.au

Manly Rugby Union Football Club is a rugby union club based in Manly, a suburb of Sydney's Northern Beaches. The club was added to the Sydney district clubs competition in 1906 which today competes for the Shute Shield under the New South Wales Rugby Union. They are today known as the Marlins and play their home games at Manly Oval.

The new Manly district club was formed in 1906 via an informal merger of the existing Manly clubs, which have roots back to 1883. The local homeground, Manly Oval, was used for the new club.

The Manly district club colours in 1906 were white jerseys with deep red collar/neck/cuffs, then from 1907 to 1914 were navy blue, light blue and red. Red and royal blue jerseys have been used since the early 1920s.

Late in the 1914 season it was announced that Manly were to be made merge with the neighbouring North Sydney club under the name Northern Suburbs, however with the outbreak of World War One the plan was abandoned. No club competitions were played again in Sydney until 1919.

The club were a great force in the 1920s and 1930s. In 1950 Manly won both the first grade and reserve grade titles in the same season. However, there were no titles for over 30 years, until 1983, under coach Alan Jones, though the club, while playing entertaining running rugby, could not produce consistent results.

In 1997 the club again won the first grade title. In 2006 Manly celebrated 100 years of rugby. Scott Clemmett has scored 7 tries for Manly and Anthony Bergelin has scored 10. Yool Yool 9.

== Honours ==
- Shute Shield Titles (1st Grade): 7 (1922, 1932, 1942, 1943, 1950, 1983, 1997)
- Melrose Sevens Winners (1): 1995

== Super Rugby representatives ==
- George Smith – Act Brumbies
- Tyrone Smith – ACT Brumbies
- Michael Hooper – NSW Waratahs
- Wycliff Palu – NSW Waratahs
- Chris Siale – Queensland Reds
- Andrew Smith – ACT Brumbies
- Eddie Aholelei – Melbourne Rebels
- Cadeyrn Neville – Melbourne Rebels
- Jono Owen – Melbourne Rebels
- Reece Hodge – Melbourne Rebels
- Lalakai Foketi – NSW Waratahs
- Dave Porecki – NSW Waratahs
- Max Douglas – NSW Waratahs
- Langi Gleeson – NSW Waratahs

== Sponsors ==
- Mounties
- Allied World
- Belle Property
- Pallas Capital
- Northern Beaches Toyota
- Felons Manly
- EDP
- Cooks Plumbing
- McPhee Transport
- GSA
- Vivid
- ICMS
- ISCA
- Brookvale Mazda
- Hotel Steyne
- Online Projects
- Manly Rugby Foundation
- Budgy Smuggler
- Get Plumbing
- Garfish
- Balgowlah Automotive
- Innovative Print Solutions
- AVA Hire
- O'Neills Sportswear
- Kennards Hire
- Autotune Freshwater
- ID Fitouts
- Bergelin Estate Agents
- Pine Property
