= 2015 New South Wales Waratahs season =

New South Wales Waratahs
- 2015 season
- Coach: Michael Cheika
- Super Rugby: 2nd
- Super Rugby Finals Series: TBD
- Top try scorer: League: Taqele Naiyaravoro
- Top points scorer: League: Bernard Foley
- Highest home attendance: 27,243 vs Brumbies; 22 March 2015
- Lowest home attendance: 15,807 vs Rebels; 25 April 2015

The 2015 New South Wales Waratahs season was the club's 19th season since the inception of Super Rugby in 1996.

== Players ==
=== Squad ===
The squad for the 2015 Super Rugby season

**Props**: (Australia) Michael Alaalatoa; (Australia) **Sekope Kepu**; (Australia) **Benn Robinson**; (Australia) **Paddy Ryan**; (Australia) Jeremy Tilse; **Hookers**: (Australia) Tolu Latu; (Australia) **Tatafu Polota-Nau**; (Australia) Dave Porecki; (Australia) Hugh Roach; **Locks**: (Australia) Jed Holloway; (New Zealand) Sam Lousi; (Australia) **Dean Mumm**; (Australia) **Will Skelton**	**Loose forwards**: (Australia) Mitchell Chapman; (Australia) Jack Dempsey; (Australia) **Dave Dennis** (c); (Australia) Tala Gray; (Australia) **Stephen Hoiles**; (Australia) **Michael Hooper** (v/c); (Australia) Pat McCutcheon; (Australia) **Wycliff Palu**; (South Africa) **Jacques Potgieter**; **Scrum-halves**: (Samoa) Auvasa Faleali'i; (Australia) Brendan McKibbin; (Australia) **Nick Phipps**; **Fly-halves**: (Australia) **Bernard Foley**; (Australia) David Horwitz; (Australia) Ben Volavola	**Centres**: (Australia) **Adam Ashley-Cooper** (v/c); (Australia) **Rob Horne**; (Australia) Jono Lance; **Wingers**: (Australia) **Peter Betham**; (Australia) Matthew Carraro; (Australia) Andrew Kellaway; (Fiji) Taqele Naiyaravoro; **Fullbacks**: (Australia) **Kurtley Beale**; (Australia) **Israel Folau** (v/c)

(c) Denotes team captain, Bold denotes player is internationally capped.

=== Transfers ===
Ins:

Player	Position	Previous Club	Notes
Dave Porecki	Hooker	(New Zealand) North Harbour Rays	Short-term contract
Sam Lousi	Lock	New Zealand Warriors (NRL)	
Dean Mumm	Lock	(England) Exeter Chiefs	Short-term contract
Jack Dempsey	Flanker	(New Zealand) North Harbour Rays	Short-term contract
Auvasa Faleali'i	Scrum half	Greater Sydney Rams	
David Horwitz	Fly Half	Extended playing squad	
Andrew Kellaway	Winger	NSW Country Eagles	

Outs:

Player	Position	Previous Club	Notes
Kane Douglas	Lock	(Ireland) Leinster	
Michael Hodge	Centre	Sydney Stars	
Alofa Alofa	Winger	(France) La Rochelle	
Cam Crawford	Fullback	Rebels	

== Quick Summary ==
Rd	Date and local time		Opponent	Score	Venue	Attendance	Ref
1	Sunday, 15 February (4:05 pm)	H	Western Force	13–25	Allianz Stadium, Sydney, Australia	20,271	
2	Friday, 20 February (7:40 pm)	A	Melbourne Rebels	28–38	AAMI Park, Melbourne, Australia	12,178	
3	Bye						
4	Saturday, 7 March (6:40 pm)	A	Queensland Reds	5–23	Suncorp Stadium, Brisbane, Australia	27,199	
5	Saturday, 14 March (7:35 pm)	A	(New Zealand) Highlanders	26–19	Forsyth Barr Stadium, Dunedin, New Zealand		
6	Sunday, 22 March (4:05 pm)	H	Brumbies	28–13	Allianz Stadium, Sydney, Australia	27,243	
7	Saturday, 28 March (7:40 pm)	H	(New Zealand) Blues	23–11	Allianz Stadium, Sydney, Australia	16,342	
8	Bye						
9	Saturday, 11 April (7:40 pm)	H	(South Africa) Stormers	18–32	Allianz Stadium, Sydney, Australia	17,353	
10	Saturday, 18 April (4:30 pm)	A	(New Zealand) Hurricanes	24–29	Westpac Stadium, Wellington, New Zealand	15,327	
11	Saturday, 25 April (7:55 pm)	H	Rebels	18–16	ANZ Stadium, Sydney, Australia	15,807	
12	Friday, 1 May (7:40 pm)	A	Brumbies	10–13	Canberra Stadium, Canberra, Australia	17,563	
13	Saturday, 9 May (7:40 pm)	A	Force	18–11	nib Stadium, Perth, Australia	10,115	
14	Saturday, 16 May (7:40 pm)	H	(South Africa) Sharks	33–18	Allianz Stadium, Sydney, Australia	18,578	
15	Saturday, 16 May (7:40 pm)	H	(New Zealand) Crusaders	32–22	ANZ Stadium, Sydney, Australia	26,971	
16	Saturday, 30 May (7:10 pm)	A	Lions, South Africa	27–22	Ellis Park Stadium, Johannesburg	28,475	
17	Saturday, 6 June (3:00 pm)	A	(South Africa) Cheetahs	33–58	Free State Stadium, Bloemfontein, South Africa		
18	Saturday, 13 June (7:40 pm)	H	Reds	31–5	Allianz Stadium, Sydney, Australia	26,746	
SF	26–27 June	H	(New Zealand) Highlanders	17-35	Allianz Stadium, Sydney, Australia		

== Standings ==
Pos	Team	Pld	W	D	L	PF	PA	PD	TF	TA	TB	LB	Pts	Qualification
1	(New Zealand) Hurricanes	16	14	0	2	458	288	+170	58	31	9	1	66	Qualified to the Semi-finals with home advantage.
2	(Australia) Waratahs	16	11	0	5	409	313	+96	50	41	5	3	52	Qualified to the Semi-finals with home advantage.
3	(South Africa) Stormers	16	10	1	5	373	323	+50	32	35	2	1	45	Qualified to the Qualifying final with home advantage.
4	(New Zealand) Highlanders	16	11	0	5	450	333	+117	54	40	6	3	53	Qualified to the Qualifying final with home advantage.
5	(New Zealand) Chiefs	16	10	0	6	372	299	+73	40	27	4	4	48	Qualified to the Qualifying final.
6	(Australia) Brumbies	16	9	0	7	369	261	+108	45	21	6	5	47	Qualified to the Qualifying final.
7	(New Zealand) Crusaders	16	9	0	7	481	338	+143	56	39	8	2	46	
8	(South Africa) Lions	16	9	1	6	342	364	−22	33	41	2	2	42	
9	(South Africa) Bulls	16	7	0	9	397	388	+9	37	39	4	6	38	
10	(Australia) Rebels	16	7	0	9	319	354	−35	35	42	3	5	36	
11	(South Africa) Sharks	16	7	0	9	338	401	−63	37	43	3	3	34	
12	(South Africa) Cheetahs	16	5	0	11	357	531	−174	44	65	4	2	26	
13	(Australia) Reds	16	4	0	12	247	434	−187	32	53	3	3	22	
14	(New Zealand) Blues	16	3	0	13	282	428	−146	29	50	2	6	20	
15	(Australia) Force	16	3	0	13	245	384	−139	28	43	3	4	19	

Rules for classification: Teams standings were calculated as follows: 1. Conference Leaders (i.e. conference leaders will always be ranked in the top three); 2. Log points; 3. Number of games won; 4. Overall points difference; 5. Number of tries scored; 6. Overall try difference
- Points breakdown: 4 points for a win; 2 points for a draw; 1 bonus point for a loss by seven points or less; 1 bonus point for scoring four or more tries in a match
- Qualification: The top six teams qualified to the finals, with their final positions in the overall log determining their seedings in the finals. The third-placed team (i.e. the conference winners with the worst overall record) hosted the sixth-placed team in the qualifiers, while the fourth-placed team hosted the fifth-placed team. The top two teams (i.e. the two conference winners with the best overall record) qualified directly to the semi-finals, where they had home advantage against the two qualifier winners, with the top team hosting the qualifier winner with the lower seeding and the second-placed team hosting the qualifier winner with the higher seeding. The two semi-final winners progressed to the final, with the team with the higher seeding having home advantage.

(Australia) Australian Conference
Pos	Team	Pld	W	D	L	PF	PA	PD	TF	TA	TB	LB	Pts
1	Waratahs	16	11	0	5	409	313	+96	50	41	5	3	52
2	Brumbies	16	9	0	7	369	261	+108	45	21	6	5	47
3	Rebels	16	7	0	9	319	354	−35	35	42	3	5	36
4	Reds	16	4	0	12	247	434	−187	32	53	3	3	22
5	Force	16	3	0	13	245	384	−139	28	43	3	4	19

== Detailed season summary ==
=== Regular season ===
February

Round 1	15 February 2015	Waratahs	13–25	Force	Allianz Stadium, Sydney
	16:05	Try: Rob Horne 54', 77'; Con: Bernard Foley (0/2); Pen: Bernard Foley 24' (1/2); Cards: Wycliff Palu (yellow card) 34' to 42'	Report; Scoreboard	Try: Chris Alcock 36'; Angus Cottrell 46'; Luke Morahan 67'; Francois van Wyk 73'; Con: Sias Ebersohn 47' (1/3); Zack Holmes (0/1); Pen: Sias Ebersohn 12' (1/3); Drop: Sias Ebersohn (0/1); Cards: Alby Mathewson (yellow card) 54' to 65'	Attendance: 20,271; Referee: Steve Walsh

Round 2	20 February 2015	Rebels	28–38	Waratahs	AAMI Park, Melbourne
	19:40	Try: Scott Higginbotham 12'; Lopeti Timani 40'; Luke Burgess 53'; Sefa Naivalu 66'; Con: Mike Harris 13', 40', 54', 67' (4/4); Pen: Mike Harris (0/1); Jack Debreczeni (0/1)	Report; Scoreboard	Try: Stephen Hoiles 22'; Taqele Naiyaravoro 43', 61'; Kurtley Beale 73'; Con: Bernard Foley 23', 44', 74' (3/4); Pen: Bernard Foley 4', 33', 78' (3/3); Kurtley Beale 27' (1/1); Cards: Taqele Naiyaravoro (yellow card) 63' to 74'	Attendance: 12,178; Referee: Angus Gardner

Round 3	Waratahs	v	Bye	N/A

March

Round 4	7 March 2015	Reds	5–23	Waratahs	Suncorp Stadium, Brisbane
	18:40	Try: Marco Kotze 80'; Con: James O'Connor (0/1); Pen: James O'Connor (0/2)	Report; Scoreboard	Try: Bernard Foley 25'; Peter Betham 67'; Con: Bernard Foley 26', 68' (2/2); Pen: Bernard Foley 13', 23', 50' (3/4); Cards: Tatafu Polota-Nau (yellow card) 57' to 68'	Attendance: 27,199; Referee: Glen Jackson

Round 5	14 March 2015	Highlanders	26–19	Waratahs	Forsyth Barr Stadium, Dunedin
	19:35	Try: Tom Franklin 29'; Waisake Naholo 39'; Ben Smith 44'; Patrick Osborne 47'; Con: Lima Sopoaga 30', 40', 45' (3/4); Pen: Lima Sopoaga (0/2)	Report; Scoreboard	Try: Nick Phipps 3'; Matthew Carraro 19'; Stephen Hoiles 78'; Con: Bernard Foley 20', 79' (2/3); Cards: Sekope Kepu (yellow card) 28' to 38'	Referee: Craig Joubert

Round 6	22 March 2015	Waratahs	28–13	Brumbies	Allianz Stadium, Sydney
	16:05	Try: Bernard Foley 26'; Israel Folau 31'; Tolu Latu 73'; Con: Bernard Foley 27', 32' (2/3); Pen: Bernard Foley 11', 16' (2/2); Kurtley Beale 47' (1/1); Cards: Tolu Latu (yellow card) 79'	Report; Scoreboard	Try: Matt To'omua 3'; Con: Christian Lealiifano 4' (1/1); Pen: Christian Lealiifano 18', 23' (2/2); Cards: Scott Fardy (yellow card) 9' to 19'	Attendance: 27,243; Referee: Craig Joubert

Round 7	28 March 2015	Waratahs	23–11	Blues	Allianz Stadium, Sydney
	19:40	Try: Nick Phipps 8'; Peter Betham 75'; Con: Bernard Foley 9', 76' (2/2); Pen: Bernard Foley 58', 61', 68' (3/4); Kurtley Beale (0/1)	Report; Scoreboard	Try: Francis Saili 54'; Con: Daniel Bowden (0/1); Pen: Daniel Bowden 14', 24' (2/3); Cards: Jerome Kaino (yellow card) 72'	Attendance: 16,342; Referee: Jaco Peyper

April

Round 8	Waratahs	v	Bye	N/A

Round 9	11 April 2015	Waratahs	18–32	Stormers	Allianz Stadium, Sydney
	19:40	Try: Taqele Naiyaravoro 13'; Rob Horne 40'; Con: Bernard Foley 40' (1/2); Pen: Bernard Foley 35', 58' (2/4)	Report; Scoreboard	Try: Damian de Allende 21', 71'; Kobus van Wyk 47'; Cheslin Kolbe 77'; Con: Demetri Catrakilis 22' (1/1); Kurt Coleman 48', 72' (2/3); Pen: Demetri Catrakilis 7', 17' (2/2); Kurt Coleman (0/2); Drop: Demetri Catrakilis (0/1)	Attendance: 17,353; Referee: Mike Fraser

Round 10	18 April 2015	Hurricanes	24–29	Waratahs	Westpac Stadium, Wellington
	16:30	Try: Conrad Smith 21'; Beauden Barrett 23'; Brad Shields 38'; TJ Perenara 70'; Con: Beauden Barrett 22', 24' (2/4)	Report; Scoreboard	Try: Peter Betham 14', 40'; Will Skelton 34'; Israel Folau 52'; Con: Bernard Foley 15', 40', 53' (3/4); Pen: Bernard Foley 58' (1/2)	Attendance: 15,327; Referee: Glen Jackson

Round 11	25 April 2015	Waratahs	18–16	Rebels	ANZ Stadium, Sydney
	19:55	Try: Michael Hooper 9'; Adam Ashley-Cooper 20'; Rob Horne 60'; Con: Bernard Foley (0/3); Pen: Bernard Foley 16' (1/2)	Report; Scoreboard	Try: Bryce Hegarty 74'; Con: Jack Debreczeni 75' (1/1); Pen: Jack Debreczeni 40', 50', 58' (3/3); Cards: Sefa Naivalu (yellow card) 27' to 37'	Attendance: 15,807; Referee: Rohan Hoffmann

May

Round 12	1 May 2015	Brumbies	10–13	Waratahs	GIO Stadium, Canberra
	19:40	Try: Joe Tomane 8'; Con: Christian Lealiifano 9' (1/1); Pen: Christian Lealiifano 28' (1/2)	Report; Scoreboard	Try: Adam Ashley-Cooper 14'; Con: Bernard Foley 15' (1/1); Pen: Kurtley Beale 48' (1/1); Bernard Foley 58' (1/2); Cards: Rob Horne (yellow card) 65' to 75'	Attendance: 17,563; Referee: Glen Jackson

Round 13	9 May 2015	Force	18–11	Waratahs	{{{s}}}, [[{{{slan}}}]]
	17:40	Try: Ryan Louwrens 19'; Matt Hodgson 63'; Con: Luke Burton 20' (1/2); Pen: Marcel Brache (0/1); Luke Burton 31', 40' (2/4); Sias Ebersohn (0/2); Cards: Matt Hodgson (yellow card) 70'	Report; Scoreboard	Try: Taqele Naiyaravoro 52'; Con: Bernard Foley (0/1); Pen: Bernard Foley 24', 27' (2/3); Kurtley Beale (0/1); Cards: Sekope Kepu (yellow card) 33' to 43'	Attendance: 10,115; Referee: Rohan Hoffmann

Round 14	16 May 2015	Waratahs	33–18	Sharks	Allianz Stadium, Sydney
	19:40	Try: Adam Ashley-Cooper 1'; Taqele Naiyaravoro 53'; Bernard Foley 79'; Con: Bernard Foley 2', 54', 80' (3/3); Pen: Bernard Foley 21', 29', 63', 70' (4/4)	Report; Scoreboard	Try: Odwa Ndungane 49'; François Steyn 58'; Con: François Steyn 59' (1/2); Pen: François Steyn 18', 36' (2/2)	Attendance: 18,578; Referee: Rohan Hoffmann

Round 15	23 May 2015	Waratahs	32–22	Crusaders	ANZ Stadium, Sydney
	19:40	Try: Taqele Naiyaravoro 7', 52'; Rob Horne 24'; Bernard Foley 77'; Con: Bernard Foley 8', 25', 78' (3/4); Pen: Kurtley Beale (0/1); Bernard Foley 21', 44' (2/3); Cards: Tolu Latu (yellow card) 18' to 30'	Report; Scoreboard	Try: Nemani Nadolo 2'; Richie McCaw 56'; Matt Todd 66'; Con: Dan Carter 57', 67' (2/3); Pen: Dan Carter 12' (1/1); Cards: Richie McCaw (yellow card) 71'	Attendance: 26,971; Referee: Marius van der Westhuizen

Round 16	30 May 2015	Lions	27–22	Waratahs	Emirates Airline Park, Johannesburg
	19:10	Try: Ruan Combrinck 6', 34'; Harold Vorster 48'; Con: Elton Jantjies 7', 35', 49' (3/3); Pen: Elton Jantjies 28', 43' (2/5)	Report; Scoreboard	Try: Stephen Hoiles 18'; Adam Ashley-Cooper 52'; Rob Horne 58'; Con: Bernard Foley 19', 59' (2/3); Pen: Bernard Foley 9' (1/1); Kurtley Beale (0/1); Cards: Rob Horne (yellow card) 27' to 37'; Jacques Potgieter (yellow card) 45' to 55'	Attendance: 28,475; Referee: Jaco Peyper

June

Round 17	6 June 2015	Cheetahs	33–58	Waratahs	{{{s}}}, [[{{{slan}}}]]
	15:00	Try: Francois Venter 11', 80'; Cornal Hendricks 14', 55'; Boom Prinsloo 28'; Con: Coenie van Wyk 12', 15', 29' (3/3); Niel Marais 56' (1/2); Cards: Rayno Benjamin (yellow card) 60' to 70'	Report; Scoreboard	Try: Israel Folau 4', 38', 60'; Michael Hooper 8'; Matthew Carraro 19', 76'; Taqele Naiyaravoro 40'; Adam Ashley-Cooper 41'; Bernard Foley 72'; Con: Bernard Foley 9', 40', 61', 73', 77' (5/9); Pen: Bernard Foley 65' (1/1)	Referee: Glen Jackson

Round 18	13 June 2015	Waratahs	31–5	Reds	Allianz Stadium, Sydney
	19:40	Try: Dave Dennis 53'; Jacques Potgieter 57'; Brendan McKibbin 68'; Dean Mumm 73'; Con: Bernard Foley 54', 58', 69', 74' (4/4); Pen: Bernard Foley 18' (1/1)	Report; Scoreboard	Try: Quade Cooper 78'; Con: Ben Tapuai (0/1); Pen: Quade Cooper (0/1); Cards: Adam Thomson (yellow card) 50' to 61'	Attendance: 26,746; Referee: Nick Briant

=== Finals ===
As the Waratahs came second on the overall standings, they directly qualified for the semi-finals bypassing the first week of qualifying finals.

Semi-final

26/27 June 2015	Waratahs	17-35	Highlanders	Allianz Stadium, Sydney
