= Brad Mika =

NZ international rugby union player (born 1981)

- Born: Bradley Moni Mika; 2 June 1981 (age 45) Auckland, New Zealand
- Height: 6 ft 6 in (1.98 m)
- Weight: 271 lb (123 kg)
- Notable relative(s): Cameron Skelton (cousin); Jeral Skelton (cousin); Will Skelton (cousin)

Rugby union career
- Position: Lock
Senior career
| Years | Team | Apps | (Points) |
| 2007–08 | Brive | 6 | (0) |
| 2009–10 | NTT Communications Shining Arcs | 1 | (0) |
Provincial / State sides
| Years | Team | Apps | (Points) |
| 2004–07 & 2011–2012 | Auckland | 41 | (62) |
Super Rugby
| Years | Team | Apps | (Points) |
| 2002 | Crusaders | 6 | (10) |
| 2003–05 | Blues | 29 | (10) |
| 2006 | Crusaders | 6 | (0) |
| 2007 | Hurricanes | 10 | (0) |
| 2011–12 | Blues | 6 | (0) |
International career
| Years | Team | Apps | (Points) |
| 2002 | New Zealand | 3 | (0) |

Bradley Moni Mika (born 2 June 1981) is a New Zealand rugby union player. His position is lock. He was educated at St Peter's College. He made his provincial debut for Auckland in 2000, his Super Rugby debut for Crusaders in 2002, and his international debut in the same year.

In 2007, after stints with the Crusaders, Blues and Hurricanes, he headed overseas, playing in France and Japan. In 2011 he re-signed with the Blues. Mika played three tests for the All Blacks in 2002. He made his debut against England and played his last test against Wales. His career ended in 2012 when he had his fifth knee surgery, but was considered far too young for knee reconstructions. He was Malaysian Rugby National head Coach from 2015 to 2021. Won the Asian first Division 2016 & 2017.

In 2021/22, he returned to NZ to complete season 2 of Match Fit. On episode 1, he didn't participate in the Bronco Test, a 1 km agility and endurance test with 30 changes of directions at the 22m, 50m and full length of field, due to knee issues and lack of mobility to squat. On episode 2, however, he won the lineout throw simulation as a hooker, beating Corey Flynn. He then sat himself out against East Coast, again due to arthritis on his knees.
