= Cameron Skelton =

New Zealand rugby union player

- Born: Cameron Skelton; 8 March 1995 (age 31) Auckland, New Zealand
- Height: 2.11 m (6 ft 11 in)
- Weight: 167 kg (26 st 4 lb; 368 lb)
- School: The Hills Sports High School
- University: Sydney University
- Notable relative(s): Brad Mika (cousin); Will Skelton (brother); Jeral Skelton (cousin)

Rugby union career
- Position: Lock
- Current team: Bond University, 2nd Grade (formerly 3rd)
Provincial / State sides
Years	Team	Apps	(Points)
2016	Counties Manukau	2	(0)
- Correct as of 23 October 2016
International career
Years	Team	Apps	(Points)
2013/14	Samoa U20	5	(0)

Cameron Skelton (born 8 March 1995 in Auckland, New Zealand), is a retired professional rugby union player who played for Counties Manukau.

He is the brother of Australian international second-row Will Skelton and represented the Samoa national under-20 team at the 2014 Junior World Rugby Championship. Born in New Zealand, he moved with his family to Australia at the age of 7.

He is noted for his immense size, and at 2.08 m (6 ft 10 in) tall, and 153 kilograms (24 st 1 lb; 337 lb) in weight, he is taller and heavier than older brother Will. He wears a size 17 (UK) boot.

Eligible to play for Australia, New Zealand or Samoa, he was signed by the Waikato Chiefs in the summer of 2014.
