= Peter Playford =

- Born: Peter Playford; 11 July 1980 (age 46) Sydney
- Height: 187 cm (6 ft 2 in)
- Weight: 98 kg (15 st 6 lb)
- School: St. Joseph's College

Rugby union career
- Position: CEO of NSW Country Eagles
Senior career
Years	Team	Apps	(Points)
2005–09	Sydney Uni		
2007	Rebels (ARC)		
- Correct as of 1 November 2009
Provincial / State sides
Years	Team	Apps	(Points)
2000–02, 2009	Waratahs	7	(20)
2006	Tasman Makos		
- Correct as of 1 November 2009
Super Rugby
Years	Team	Apps	(Points)
2007–08	Brumbies	17	(20)
2009	Waratahs	3	(10)
- Correct as of 1 November 2009
International career
Years	Team	Apps	(Points)
1998	Australian Schoolboys		
2001	Australia U-21		
Coaching career
- Years: Team
- 2015: Sydney Stars

Peter Playford (born 11 July 1980) is an Australian rugby union football coach and a former professional player for the Waratahs and Brumbies on the wing. Playford was head coach of the Sydney Stars team for the 2015 season of the National Rugby Championship. One of his nicknames is P² (P squared).

== Early life ==
Peter Playford was born in Sydney. He attended St. Joseph's College and was selected for the Australian Schoolboys team.

== Rugby career ==
Playford made his state debut for the Waratahs in 2000 against Argentina. He was selected for the Australia U-21 side in 2001, and briefly switched codes to play rugby league for the Sydney Roosters in 2002.

After spending 2003 and 2004 focusing on his economics degree at Sydney University, Playford returned to senior rugby and scored a record 29 tries for Sydney University in the 2005 Tooheys New Cup, eclipsing the previous best of 27 tries scored by Randwick's Terry Ryan in 1971. He was selected for the Waratahs’ tour of Eastern Europe before joining the Tasman Makos for their debut season in the Air New Zealand Cup in 2006. Playford was the Makos’ leading try scorer for the season, including a four-try haul in the side's 56–16 win over Northland. He joined the Brumbies in 2007 on a two season deal to play in the Super 14 competition. Playford finally returned to the Waratahs in 2009. He retired from playing rugby after the 2009 Super 14 season.

== Coaching ==
Playford took the position of assistant coach to Sydney University's first grade team for the 2013 season. In 2014 he was appointed as assistant coach of the Sydney Stars team for the inaugural season of the National Rugby Championship, and became head coach the following year.
