= Taqele Naiyaravoro =

Australia & Fiji international dual-code rugby player

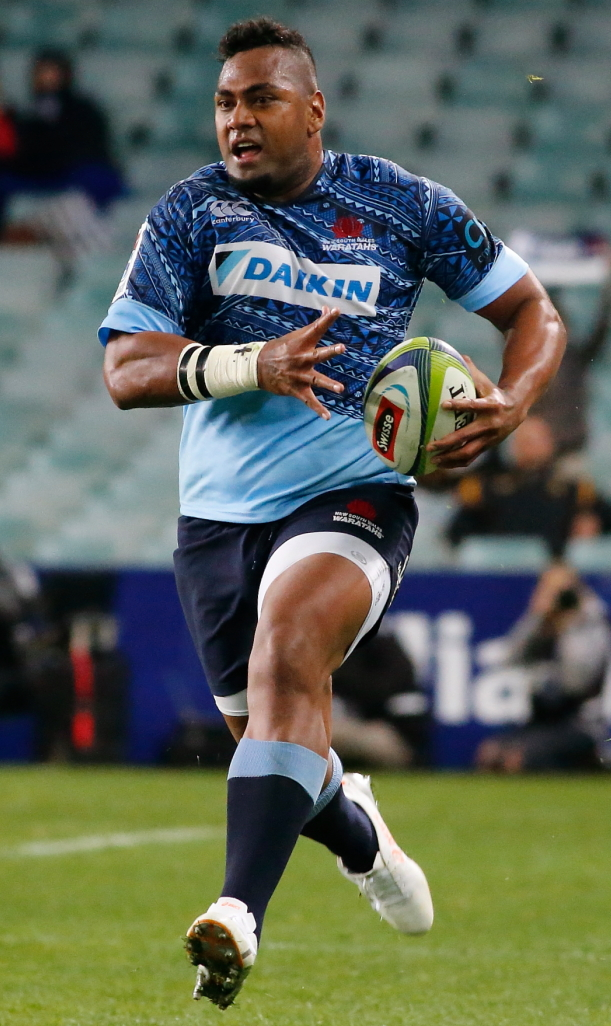
- Naiyaravoro with the Waratahs in 2017

Personal information
- Born: Taqele Naiyaravolo; 7 December 1991 (age 34) Sigatoka, Viti Levu, Fiji
- Height: 195 cm (6 ft 5 in)
- Weight: 132 kg (291 lb; 20 st 11 lb)

Playing information
- Position: Wing
Club
Years	Team	Pld	T	G	FG	P
2012–2013	Wests Tigers
Representative
Years	Team	Pld	T	G	FG	P
2011–2013	Fiji	1				0

Rugby union career
- Position: Wing
Amateur team(s)
Years	Team	Apps	(Points)
2014–2015	Parramatta Two Blues	6	(35)
2017	West Harbour	5	(20)
Senior career
Years	Team	Apps	(Points)
2014, 2017	Greater Sydney Rams	10	(40)
2015–2016	Glasgow Warriors	22	(45)
2016–2017	Panasonic Wild Knights	15	(25)
2018–2022	Northampton Saints	69	(110)
2022-2023	NEC Green Rockets	5	(5)
2024-2025	RC Narbonne	6	(10)
- Correct as of 19 August 2022
Super Rugby
Years	Team	Apps	(Points)
2014–2018	Waratahs	50	(150)
- Correct as of 19 August 2022
International career
Years	Team	Apps	(Points)
2015–	Australia	2	(10)
2015, 2016	Barbarians	2	(5)
- Correct as of 19 August 2022

Taqele Naiyaravoro (born 7 December 1991) is an Australian professional rugby union and rugby league footballer. His regular playing position is the wing.

== Early life ==
Naiyaravoro was born in Sigatoka and attended St Joan Of Arc School. During his younger days was interested in playing rugby union and watching Super 12 and his favourite player was Lote Tuqiri. He played rugby union all through his school days in Fiji and made the national Under 16s team playing both as a winger and flanker. Naiyaravoro was spotted by a player scout from New Zealand during the secondary schools rugby championship in Fiji. He joined Tamaki Sports Academy in NZ and went on to play for Otahuhu Rugby Club in Auckland.

== Career ==
=== Rugby league ===
In 2011 Naiyaravoro was recruited to Sydney rugby league club Wests Tigers, where he was playing behind the then incumbent, Pat Richards, David Nofoaluma and Marika Koroibete for a place in the main squad. He played for the Balmain Tigers in the NSW Cup. He scored 23 tries in 15 games for the Tigers before an ankle injury ruled him out of the remainder of the season. He was selected into the Fiji Bati test team to play Papua New Guinea in November 2011, after a good performance during the "Battle of the Batis". He made his Test debut on the wing for Fiji in their victory over the PNG Kumuls at Mount Hagen.

He was selected in the Fiji Bati team to the 2013 Rugby League World Cup but dropped out after his ankle-injury.

In April 2014, he was selected in to the Fiji Bati side again to prepare for their one-off test against Samoa for a berth in the 2014 Rugby League Four Nations but he pulled out because he had signed a rugby union contract with the Waratahs and was prohibited from playing rugby league. He sought release from the West Tigers after being offered a contract to play for New South Wales in Super Rugby.

=== Rugby union ===
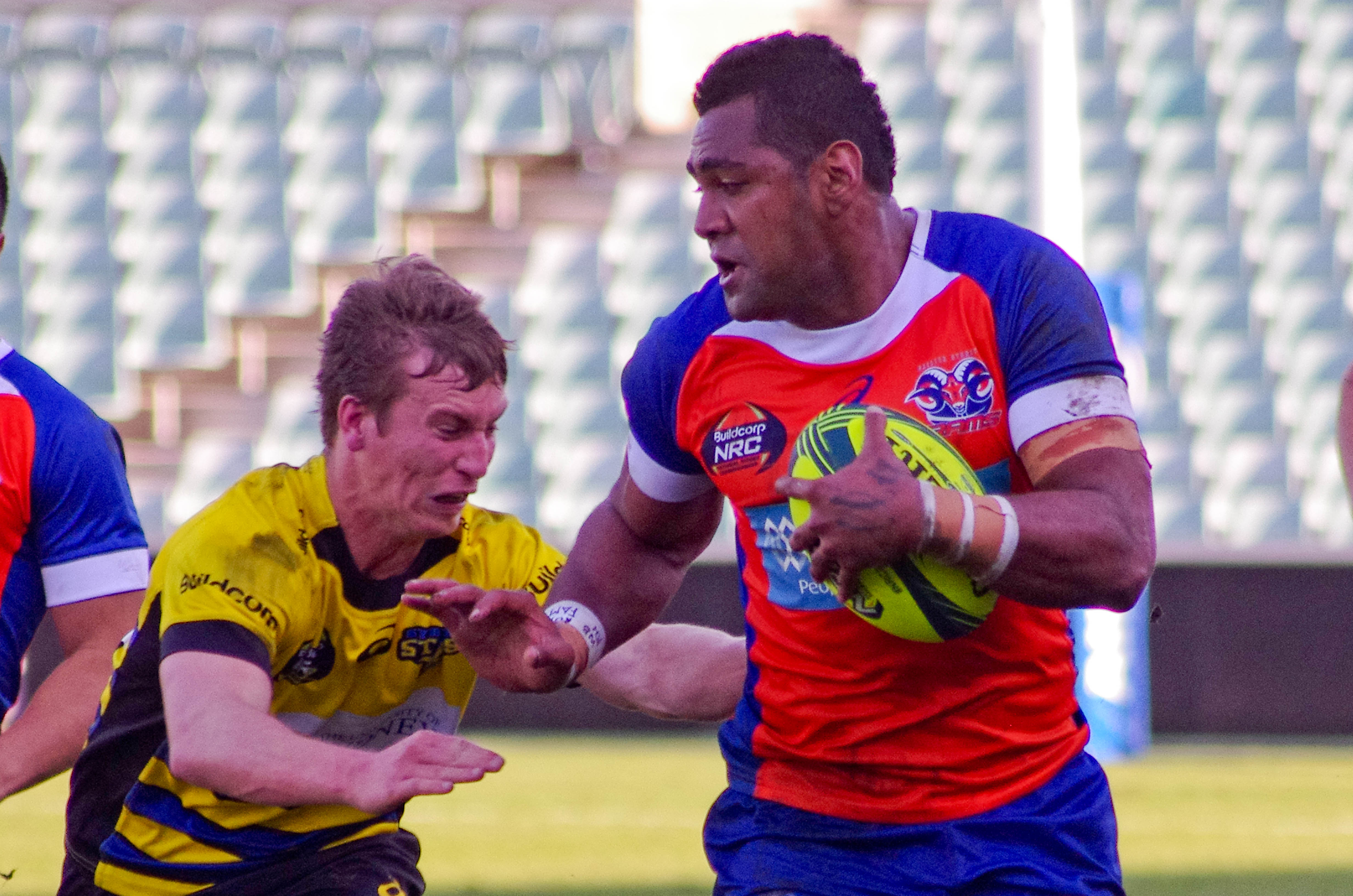
Naiyaravoro playing NRC in 2014

Naiyaravoro was signed to the New South Wales Waratahs followed injuries to regular wingers, Peter Betham and Alofa Alofa. He joined the Parramatta Two Blues team in preparation for a starting berth with the Waratahs. He made his rugby union debut in round 7 of the Shute Shield against Eastwood where he scored two tries playing on the wing and at inside centre.

On 15 May 2014, he was named on the bench for the Waratahs Super Rugby round 14 match against the Lions, where he made his debut off the bench for Adam Ashley-Cooper at the 70th minute. He scored his first try in Round 18, coming off the bench in the 70th minute and scoring the try 7 minutes later against the Highlanders.

In March 2015, he was linked with a move to Pro12 joining Scottish club, Edinburgh. The club offered him an annual salary of £175,000 to quit Super rugby. The 3-year contract was to allow him to qualify for Scotland under the 3-year residency rule. A strong performance by Naiyaravoro in May caught the eye of Wallabies coach Michael Cheika but on 18 May it was announced that Naiyaravoro had signed a three-year contract with another Scottish team, Glasgow Warriors.

In February 2018 he signed for Northampton Saints in England for the 2018/19 season. He scored his first try for the Saints verses Bristol in a 40–45 win on 29 September.

== International career ==
He was discarded from the final 31-member Wallabies squad for the 2015 Rugby World Cup. He was then named in the World XV team and on 15 August, he made his debut against Japan and he scored three tries. He was then named in the Barbarians team a week later against Samoa. He was recalled by Wallabies coach Michael Cheika and added to an extended Wallabies squad to prepare for their one-off test against United States on 5 September. During this match, Naiyaravoro came off the bench in the 71st minute to replace Rob Horne on the wing and subsequently scored a try with his first touch of the ball in the 78th minute.

After a season with Glasgow, he returned to Australia and was subsequently named in the preliminary 39 member squad for the upcoming three tests against England. He was named on the bench for the final test and scored a try after being subbed-in 7 minutes earlier. He re-signed with the Waratahs for the 2016 Super Rugby season onwards replacing New Zealand winger, Zac Guildford and was named in the Waratahs starting side a week later against the Sunwolves.

In October 2016, he was renamed in the Barbarians side for the 2016 end-of-year rugby union internationals. He started on the left wing in the first match against South Africa scoring a try and setting up 2 more for Luke Morahan and Andy Ellis and winning the official man of the match as well.

== Personal life ==
Taqele Naiyaravoro and his wife Ethel have a daughter and the family did live in Sydney.
