= Tom Robertson (rugby union) =

Australia international rugby union player

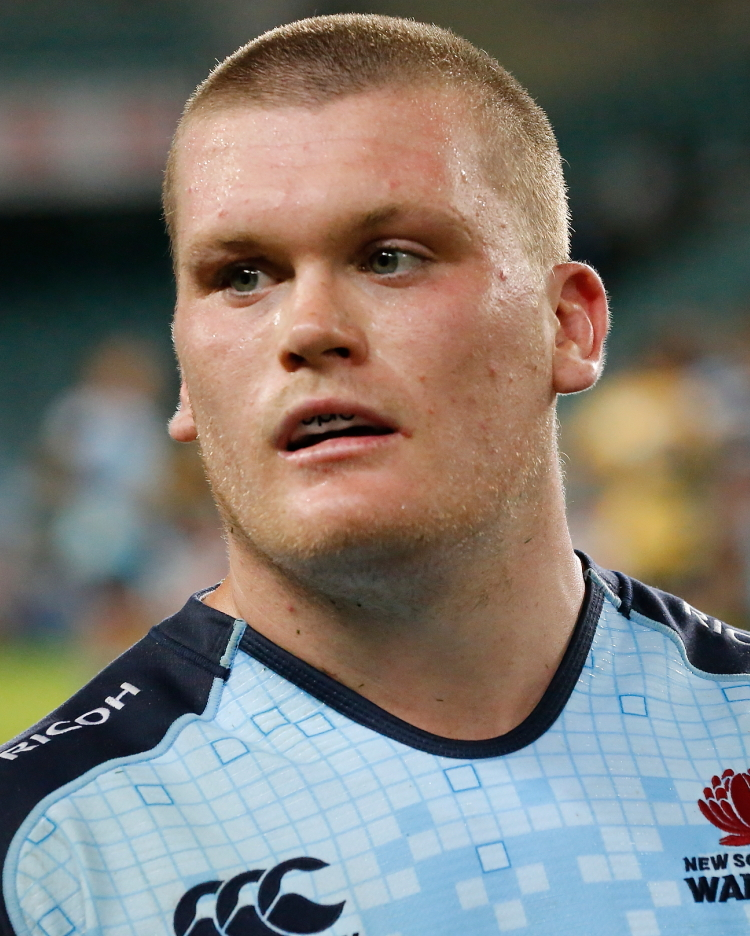
- Robertson in 2017
- Born: Tomas Robertson; 28 August 1994 (age 32) Wellington, New South Wales, Australia
- Height: 1.80 m (5 ft 11 in)
- Weight: 113 kg (17 st 11 lb; 249 lb)
- School: St Joseph's College, Hunters Hill

Rugby union career
- Position: Prop
- Current team: Western Force
Senior career
Years	Team	Apps	(Points)
2014–	Sydney University	28	(10)
2014–2015	Sydney Stars	5	(20)
2016–19	NSW Country Eagles	2	(0)
- Correct as of 11 September 2016
Super Rugby
Years	Team	Apps	(Points)
2016–21	Waratahs	62	(15)
2021–	Force	57	(15)
- Correct as of 22 June 2026
International career
Years	Team	Apps	(Points)
2012	Australian Schoolboys	3	
2014	Australia U20	3	(5)
2016–	Australia	39	(5)
- Correct as of 22 June 2026

Tom Robertson (born 28 August 1994) is an Australian rugby union football player. He currently plays for the Force in Super Rugby. Robertson's position is prop, and he can play on either tight-head or loose-head side.

== Early life ==
Robertson was born in Wellington, New South Wales, and spent his early years in Dubbo where he played junior rugby for the Dubbo Kangaroos. He later attended St Joseph's College, Hunters Hill, where he played in the 1st XV rugby team as a loose-head prop. He was selected for the Australian Schoolboys side in 2012, winning the Trans-Tasman Shield in New Zealand.

== Career ==
After joining the Sydney University rugby club and making his debut in the Shute Shield, Robertson was selected to represent Australia at the 2014 IRB Junior World Championship hosted by New Zealand. Later that year he was chosen in the Sydney Stars squad to compete in the inaugural National Rugby Championship.

Robertson began studying for a medical degree at Sydney University in 2016, and also signed a contract with the NSW Waratahs for the 2016 season. He made his debut for the Waratahs against the Highlanders on 18 March 2016 and scored a try on debut.

On September 17 2016, Robertson made his Wallabies debut against Argentina in a 36-20 Rugby Championship victory at Perth Rectangular Stadium.

In 2020, Robertson moved from the NSW Waratahs to the Western Force

In 2023, Robertson was awarded a John Monash Scholarship to undertake a Master of Policy at the Blavatnik School of Government Oxford University.

In 2025, Robertson played against the British and Irish Lions on 3 occasions, once for the Western Force and twice for the Wallabies
