= Jeral Skelton =

Samoa international rugby league & union player

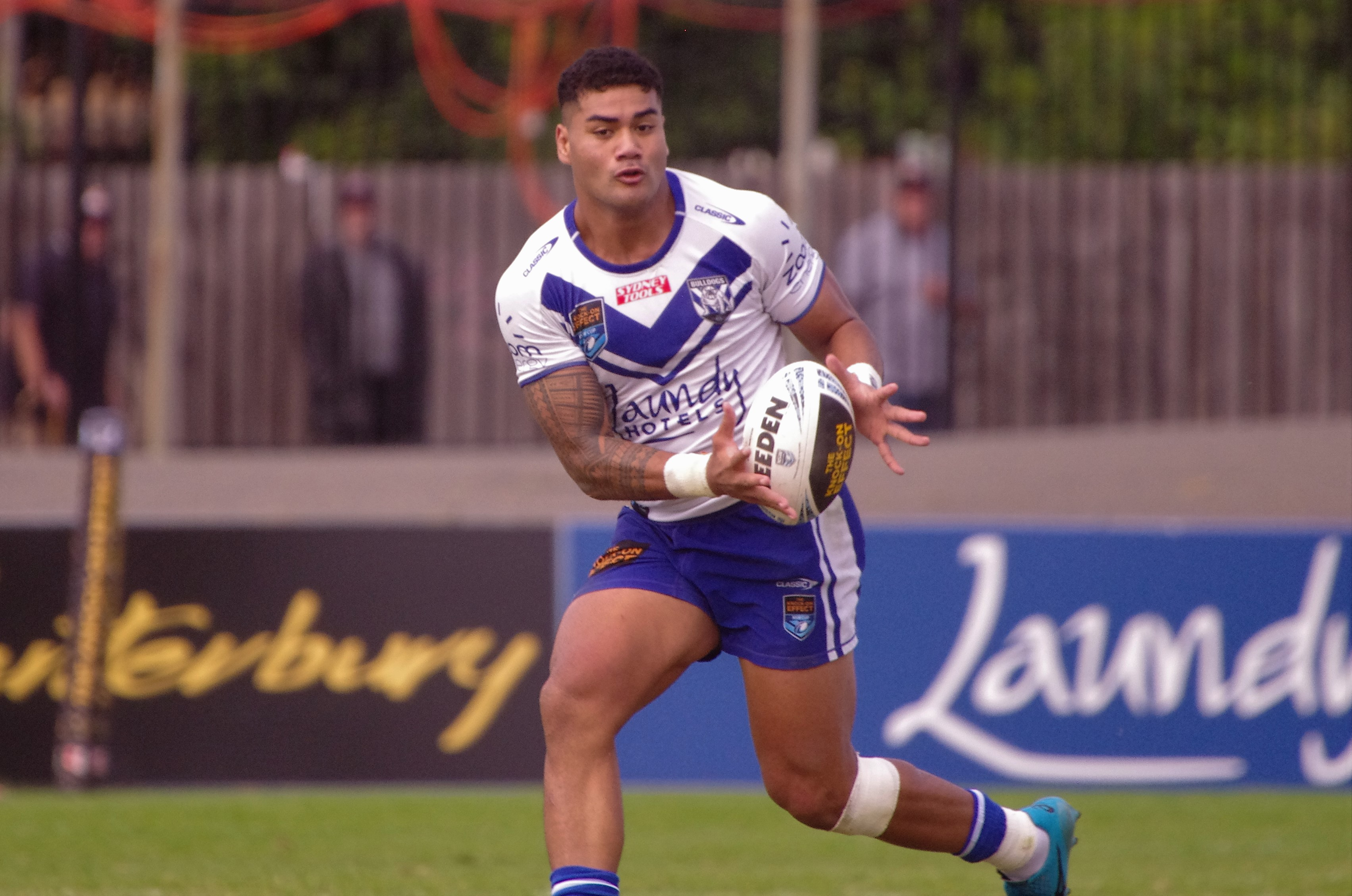
- Born: Jeral Skelton; 8 April 1999 (age 27) Redcliffe, Queensland, Australia
- Height: 188 cm (6 ft 2 in)
- Weight: 105 kg (231 lb; 16 st 7 lb)
- Notable relative(s): Peter Betham (cousin); Will Skelton (cousin); Cameron Skelton (cousin)

Rugby union career
- Position: Flanker / Centre
Super Rugby
Years	Team	Apps	(Points)
2020–2022	Rebels	2	(0)
- Correct as of 30 May 2022
National sevens team
Years	Team		Comps
2017–2020	Australia Sevens		18
- Rugby league career

Playing information
- Position: Wing
Club
Years	Team	Pld	T	G	FG	P
2023–24	Canterbury Bulldogs	8	4	0	0	16
2025–26	Wests Tigers	28	18	0	0	72
2027–	Canterbury Bulldogs	0	0	0	0	0
	Total	36	22	0	0	88
Representative
Years	Team	Pld	T	G	FG	P
2024	Samoa	2	0	0	0	0
- As of 13 November 2026

Jeral Skelton (born 8 April 1999) is a Samoa international rugby league footballer who plays as a winger for the Canterbury Bulldogs in the National Rugby League.

== Playing career ==
=== Melbourne Rebels ===
Skelton played his junior rugby for Wests Rugby and played rugby sevens for the Australia national rugby sevens team between 2017 and 2020, before switching to the 15-man code, joining the Melbourne Rebels in 2020, who he would play for until 2022.

=== Canterbury-Bankstown Bulldogs ===
He played eight NRL games for the Canterbury-Bankstown Bulldogs in 2023-24.

=== Wests Tigers ===
In August 2024 Skelton signed a two-year deal with the Wests Tigers from 2025. Skelton played 15 matches for the Wests Tigers and scored ten tries in the 2025 NRL season as the club finished 13th on the table. Skelton played 12 games for the Wests Tigers in the 2026 NRL season as the club finished 15th on the table.

On 2 October 2026, Skelton confirmed he had exited the Tigers.

=== Canterbury-Bankstown Bulldogs (re-join) ===
On 29 October 2026 it was reported that he had signed for Canterbury-Bankstown Bulldogs in the NRL on a 1-year deal.

== NRL statistics ==
Year	Team	Games	Tries	Pts
2023	Canterbury-Bankstown Bulldogs	3	1	4
2024	Canterbury-Bankstown Bulldogs	5	2	8
2025	Wests Tigers	15	10	40
2026	Wests Tigers	13	8	32
2027	Canterbury-Bankstown Bulldogs			
	Totals	36	22	88

== Super Rugby statistics ==
As of 30 May 2022

Season	Team	Games	Starts	Sub	Mins	Tries	Cons	Pens	Drops	Points	Yel	Red
2020 AU	Rebels	0	0	0	0	0	0	0	0	0	0	0
2021 AU	Rebels	2	0	2	37	0	0	0	0	0	0	0
2021 TT	Rebels	0	0	0	0	0	0	0	0	0	0	0
2022	Rebels	0	0	0	0	0	0	0	0	0	0	0
