= Dean Blore =

Samoa international rugby league footballer

Personal information
- Born: 29 September 1998 (age 26); Sydney, New South Wales, Australia
- Height: 185 cm (6 ft 1 in)
- Weight: 90 kg (14 st 2 lb)

Playing information
- Position: Five-eighth, Halfback
Representative
Years	Team	Pld	T	G	FG	P
2019	Samoa 9s	3	2	0	0	8
- As of 31 August 2020
- Education: Hills Sports High School
- Relatives: Shawn Blore (brother)

Dean Blore (born 29 September 1998) is an Australian professional rugby league footballer who plays as a five-eighth for the St George Illawarra Dragons in the NSW Cup.

== Background ==
Blore was born in Sydney, Australia. Blore played his junior rugby league for Brothers Penrith. He is of Samoan, New Zealand and Australian descent. He attended Hills Sports High School.

== Playing career ==
Blore was selected to represent the Junior Kiwis in 2018, playing against his brother Shawn, who represented the Junior Kangaroos.

Blore represented Samoa in the 2019 Rugby League World Cup 9s.

=== Penrith Panthers ===
Blore was released at the end of the 2020 season.
