= Hills Sports High School =

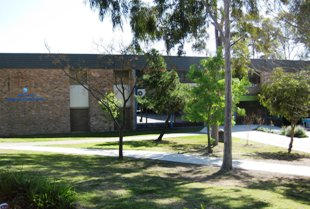
- The Hills Sports High School, as viewed from the front gate c. 2006

Location
- Best Road, Seven Hills, Western Sydney. New South Wales; Australia; 33°46′56″S 150°56′20″E

Information
- Other name: The Hills Sports High School
- Former names: Seven Hills South High School; Grantham High School
- Type: Government-funded co-educational comprehensive and specialist secondary day school
- Motto: Strive for Success
- Established: 1966; 60 years ago (as Seven Hills South High School)
- School district: The Hills; Metropolitan North
- Educational authority: New South Wales Department of Education
- Specialist: Sports school
- Principal: Amanda Di Carli
- Years: 7–12
- Enrolment: 930 (2018)
- Campus type: Suburban
- Colours: Sky blue, maroon, dark blue, and white
- Affiliation: NSW Sports High Schools Association
- Website: hillssport-h.schools.nsw.gov.au

Hills Sports High School is a government-funded co-educational comprehensive and specialist secondary day school, with speciality in sports, located on Best Road, Seven Hills, in the western suburbs of Sydney, New South Wales, Australia.

Established in 1966 as Seven Hills South High School, the school caters to approximately 930 students from Year 7 to Year 12. The school is operated by the New South Wales Department of Education; the principal is Amanda De Carli.

In addition to delivering a comprehensive education, the school has a Talented Sports Program for selected sports and achieved the status of being a selective sports school in 2002. The Hills Sports High School is a member of the NSW Sports High Schools Association.

== Talented Sports Program ==
The Hills Sports High School offers a Talented Sports Program (TSP) designed to provide high-achieving students who go through a trial program.

The sports offered by the school include athletics, Australian rules football, baseball, boxing, cricket, golf, netball, rugby league, rugby union, soccer, softball, swimming, tennis, and wrestling. In addition, regular sports include Cross-country running, touch football, hockey, volleyball.

== Notable alumni ==
=== Rugby League/Union players ===
- Dean Blore – rugby league player for the Penrith Panthers and Samoa
- Tim Brasher – rugby league player; player for the Kangaroos and New South Wales
- Dylan Brown – rugby league player
- Reagan Campbell Gillard – rugby league player; player for the Kangaroos and New South Wales
- Wade Graham – rugby league player, player for the Kangaroos and New South Wales
- Oregon Kaufusi – rugby league player
- Mahalia Murphy – rugby league and rugby union player
- Pauline Piliae-Rasabale – rugby union player
- Cameron Skelton – rugby union player
- Will Skelton – rugby union player

=== Cricketers ===
- Jake Doran – cricketer; played for Tasmania, Hobart Hurricanes and Australia under-19s; previously played for the New South Wales Blues
- Luke Doran – cricketer; played for the Sydney Sixers and the New South Wales Blues
- Antum Naqvi – cricketer in Zimbabwe

=== Soccer players ===
- Chloe Logarzo – soccer player; played with the Matildas, Washington Spirit and Sydney FC
- Kyah Simon – soccer player; played with the Matildas
- Jessika Nash – soccer player; played with the Matildas
- Sally Shippard – soccer player, played with the Matildas
- Teigen Allen – soccer player, played with the Matildas
- Caitlin Cooper – soccer player, played with the Matildas

=== Other ===
- Paige Hadley – netballer
- Matt Moran – celebrity chef
- Brandon Starc – high jumper; represented Australia at the 2016 Summer Olympics

== See also ==
- List of government schools in New South Wales
- Selective school (New South Wales)
- Education in Australia
