= Matt Sandell =

Australian rugby union player

- Born: Matthew Sandell; 20 February 1995 (age 31) Wellington, NSW, Australia
- Height: 1.87 m (6 ft 1 1/2 in)
- Weight: 112 kg (17 st 9 lb; 247 lb)
- School: St Joseph's College, Hunters Hill

Rugby union career
- Position: Prop
Senior career
Years	Team	Apps	(Points)
2014–pres.	Sydney University	17	(20)
2014–15	Sydney Stars	5	(0)
2018	Sydney Rays	4	(0)
2018–pres.	San Diego Legion	0	(0)
- Correct as of 14 October 2018
Super Rugby
Years	Team	Apps	(Points)
2015–18	NSW Waratahs	0	(0)
International career
Years	Team	Apps	(Points)
2012–13	Australian Schoolboys		
2014–15	Australia U20	3	(5)

Matthew Sandell (born 20 February 1995) is an Australian rugby union football player. He is currently contracted with the San Diego Legion team in the United States. Sandell previously played for the Sydney Rays and Sydney Stars and was a squad member of the New South Wales Waratahs. His usual position is tighthead prop.

Sandell was born in Wellington, New South Wales, and spent his early years in Mudgee. He later attended St Joseph's College, Hunters Hill where he played in the 1st XV rugby team from 2011 to 2013 as tight-head prop. He was selected for the Australian Schoolboys side in 2012 and 2013, winning the Trans-Tasman Shield in New Zealand in 2012, and touring with the team to Europe in 2013.

After joining the Sydney University rugby club and making his debut in the Shute Shield, Sandell was selected to represent Australia at the 2014 IRB Junior World Championship hosted by New Zealand. Later that year he was chosen in the Sydney Stars squad to compete in the inaugural National Rugby Championship.
