= Jeremy Tilse =

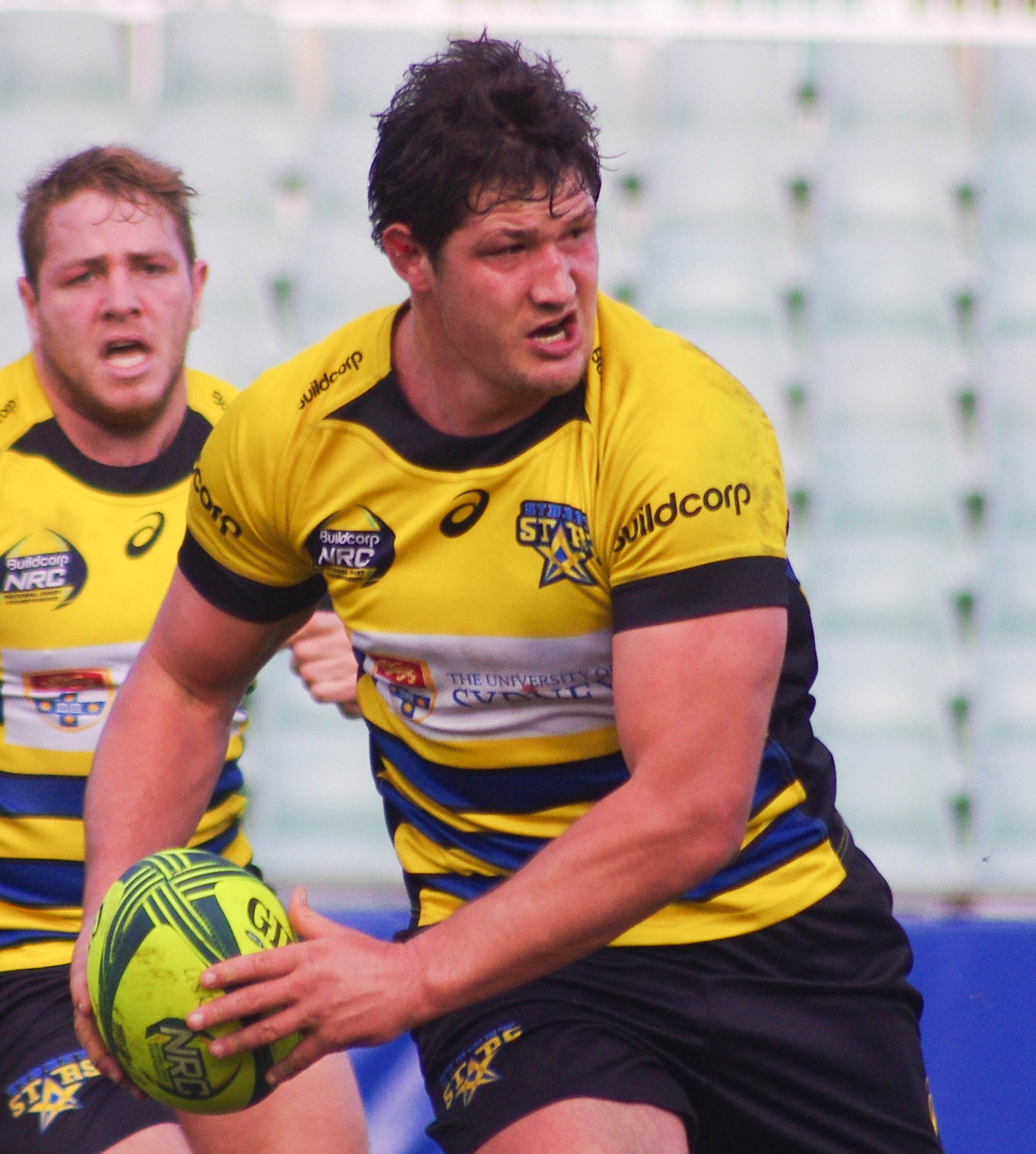
- Jeremy Tilse in 2014
- Born: Jeremy Tilse; 2 June 1986 (age 40) Newcastle, New South Wales, Australia
- Height: 1.90 m (6 ft 3 in)
- Weight: 120 kg (18 st 13 lb)

Rugby union career
- Position: Prop
- Current team: Sydney University
Senior career
Years	Team	Apps	(Points)
2007	Sydney Fleet	4	(5)
2014–2015	Sydney Stars	17	(0)
- Correct as of 3 November 2015
Super Rugby
Years	Team	Apps	(Points)
2007–2016	Waratahs	59	(0)
- Correct as of 21 July 2016

Jeremy Tilse (born 2 June 1986 in Newcastle, Australia) is a rugby union footballer. He plays for the Waratahs in Super Rugby. His regular playing position is prop.

He made his senior debut during the 2007 Super 14 season against the Cheetahs. His cousin is former Canberra Raiders and current Hull Kingston Rovers player Dane Tilse.
