= Will Skelton =

Australian rugby union player

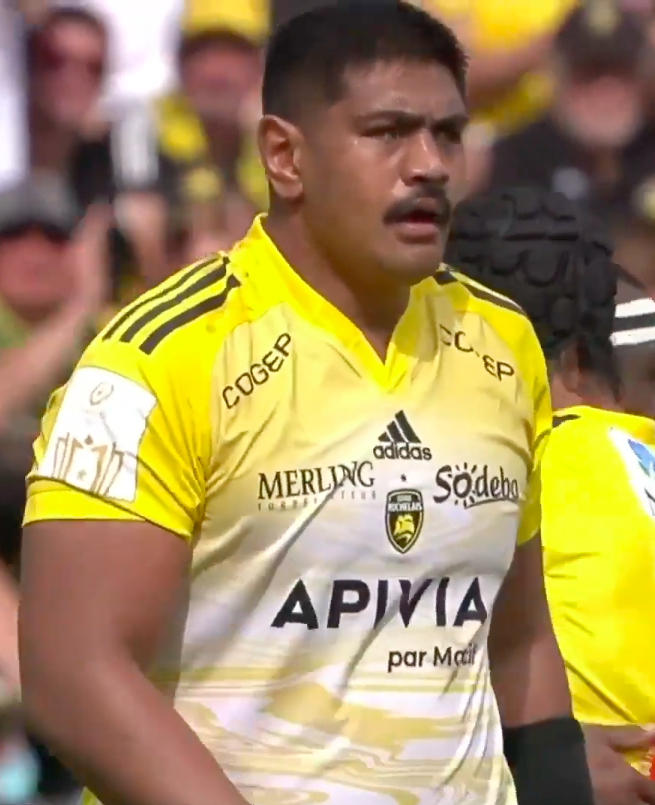
- Skelton playing for La Rochelle in 2023
- Born: William Skelton; 3 May 1992 (age 34) Auckland, New Zealand
- Height: 2.03 m (6 ft 8 in)
- Weight: 135 kg (21 st 4 lb; 298 lb)
- School: The Hills Sports High School
- University: Australian Catholic University
- Notable relative(s): Cameron Skelton (brother); Jeral Skelton (cousin); Brad Mika (cousin)

Rugby union career
- Position: Lock
- Current team: La Rochelle
Amateur team(s)
Years	Team	Apps	(Points)
2013–2017	Sydney University	13	(10)
- Correct as of 1 July 2017
Senior career
Years	Team	Apps	(Points)
2014–2015	Sydney Stars	5	(10)
2016	Western Sydney Rams	5	(0)
2017–2020	Saracens	77	(30)
2020–	La Rochelle	120	(50)
- Correct as of 23 May 2026
Super Rugby
Years	Team	Apps	(Points)
2013–2017	Waratahs	64	(15)
- Correct as of 3 June 2017
International career
Years	Team	Apps	(Points)
2011	Samoa U20	3	(0)
2014–	Australia	37	(10)
- Correct as of 23 May 2026

William Skelton (born 3 May 1992) is an Australian rugby union player, who plays as a lock for La Rochelle in the French Top 14 competition.

Skelton was born in Auckland, New Zealand, and he is of Samoan descent; he moved to Australia as a child and qualified for Australia through residency. He won 28 caps for Australia since 2014 and played at the 2015 Rugby World Cup. In August 2023 he was named captain of Australia for the 2023 Rugby World Cup.

== Early life ==
Skelton was born in Auckland, New Zealand, and moved with his family to Sydney at the age of 10. He is the older brother of Cameron Skelton and is a cousin of former New Zealand lock Brad Mika. Though smaller than his younger brother, Skelton weighed 150 kg while still a teenager and he wears size 17 (UK) boots.

He played junior rugby league for the Wentworthville Magpies before taking up rugby union at age 15 at The Hills Sports High School in Seven Hills.

Skelton joined the Sydney University rugby club in 2010. In 2011, he was invited into the Waratahs Academy and the ARU's National Academy in Sydney. After a promising first year, a fractured foot sustained in February 2012 prevented him from playing for the remainder of the year.

== Rugby career ==
=== Waratahs ===
In March 2013, Skelton was signed to the Waratahs' Extended Player Squad by coach Michael Cheika. He made his Super Rugby debut against the Stormers, and was selected to play for the Waratahs against the British and Irish Lions in June of that year.

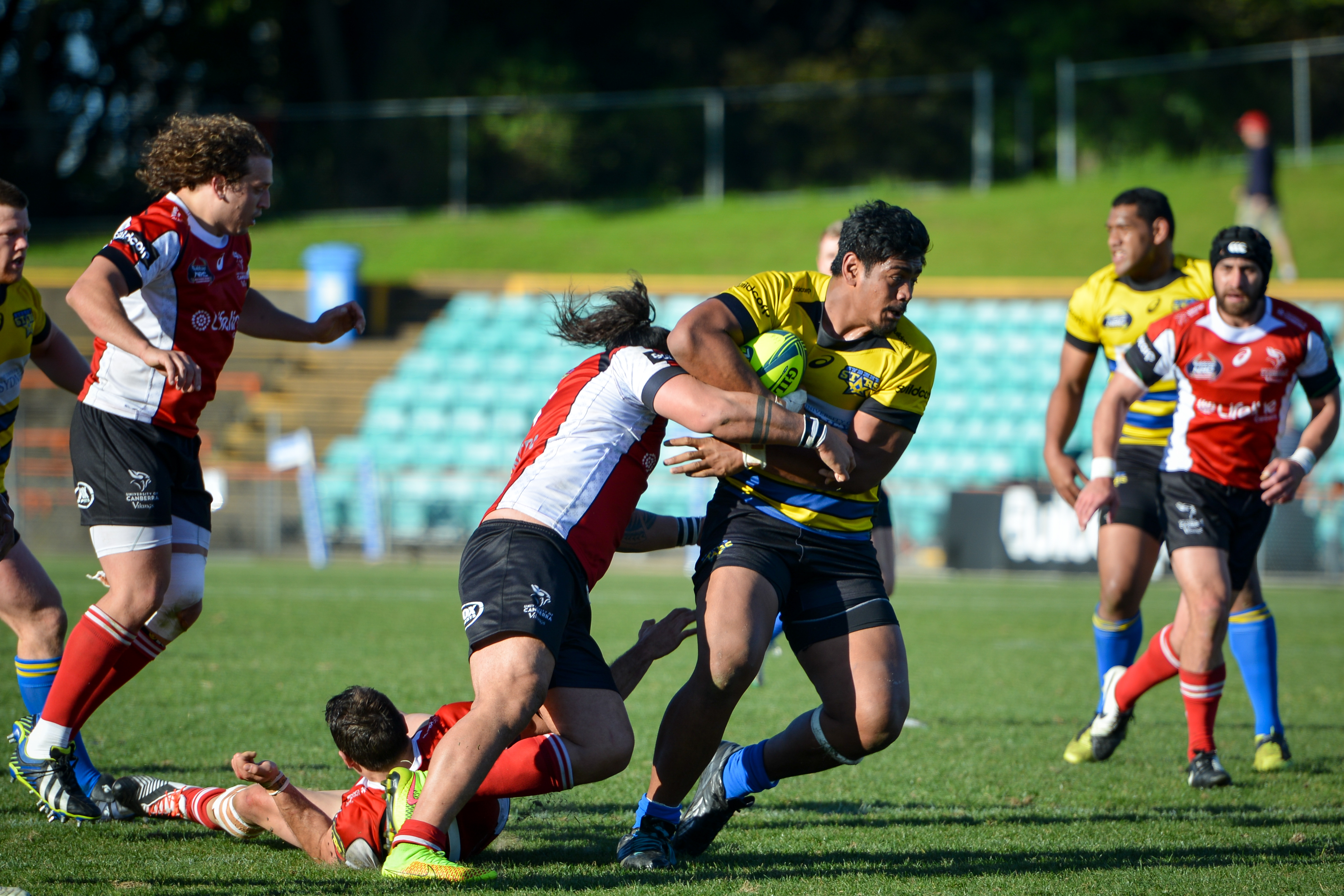
Skelton playing for Sydney Stars in the NRC.

In 2014, Skelton was approached by Graham Henry to join the Blues in Auckland, but turned him down. His offload game has been compared to Sonny Bill Williams'.

The Waratahs made the Super Rugby semi-finals in 2015. Skelton was included in the Australia squad for the Rugby Championship and he started against the Springboks in the 24–20 win at Suncorp Stadium.

=== Saracens ===
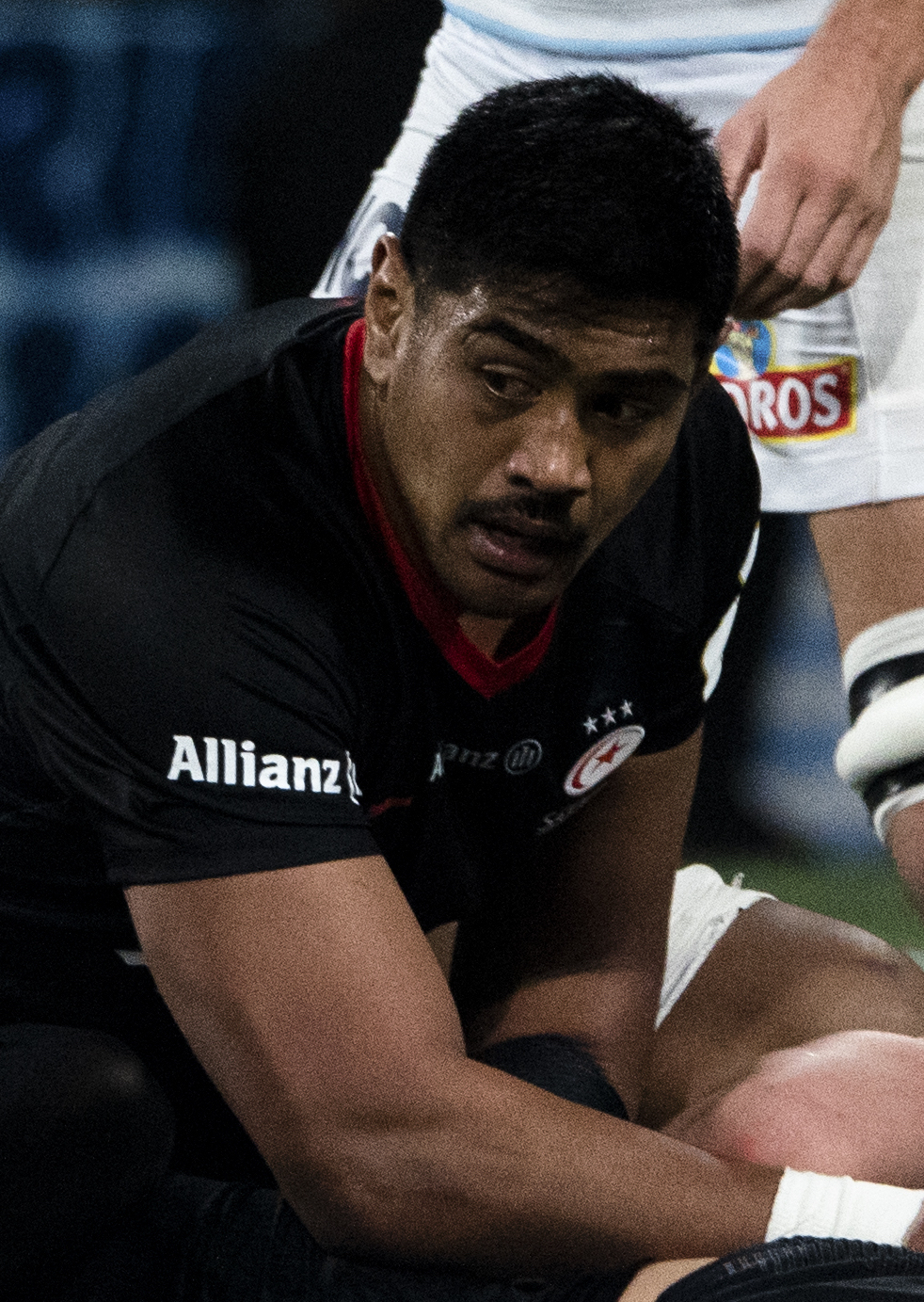
Skelton playing for Saracens in 2019

On 4 April 2017 it was announced that Skelton was to join Saracens on a 2-year deal beginning in the 2017/18 season following a successful run of 8 games whilst on a short-term loan earlier in the season. As of September 2018 Skelton had lost 21 kg weight since joining Saracens, bringing his weight to 125–130 kg. During his time at Saracens he has won two Premiership titles in 2018 and 2019. He also helped Saracens win the European Champions Cup in 2019.

=== La Rochelle ===
He signed for French club La Rochelle ahead of the 2020–21 season. Skelton was called up to play for the Wallabies again for the 2021 end-of-year rugby union internationals, alongside former teammates Kurtley Beale, Tolu Latu and Rory Arnold. On 22 June 2021, he extended his contract with the French side until 2025.

On 28 May 2022, he led La Rochelle to an epic 21–24 win against Leinster in the 2022 European Rugby Champions Cup Final at Stade Vélodrome in Marseille, being one of the best players on the field and earning his third European Rugby Champions Cup trophy. The following season, he won his third Heineken Champions Cup with La Rochelle, beating once again Leinster in the 2023 final in Dublin, Ireland on 20 May.

=== International ===
Skelton was named in the Australia squad for the June tests in 2014 and made his test debut for Australia against France on 21 June 2014. Starting as the right lock and scoring the first try for the Wallabies in their 39–13 win.

Skelton's inclusion in the Wallabies squad for the 2015 Rugby World Cup was cut short after he sustained a shoulder injury during the tournament.

In 2016 he struggled with injury but added 4 caps to his tally, coming off the bench in the spring tour in wins against Scotland and France.

1,814 days after his last test cap Skelton came off the bench in the Wallabies 2021 spring tour in 3 tests.

In 2023 Skelton was named the captain of the Wallabies for the 2023 Rugby World Cup.

== Honours ==
=== Waratahs ===
- Super Rugby: 2014

=== Saracens ===
- European Rugby Champions Cup: 2016-17, 2018-19
- Premiership: 2017-18, 2018-19
- Premiership Rugby Cup runner-up: 2018–19

=== La Rochelle ===
- European Rugby Champions Cup: 2021–22, 2022–23
- European Rugby Champions Cup runner-up: 2020–21
- Top 14 runner-up: 2020-21 2022-23

=== Australia ===
- The Rugby Championship: 2015
- Rugby World Cup runner-up: 2015
- The Rugby Championship runner-up: 2016
