= Pat McCutcheon =

Australian rugby union player

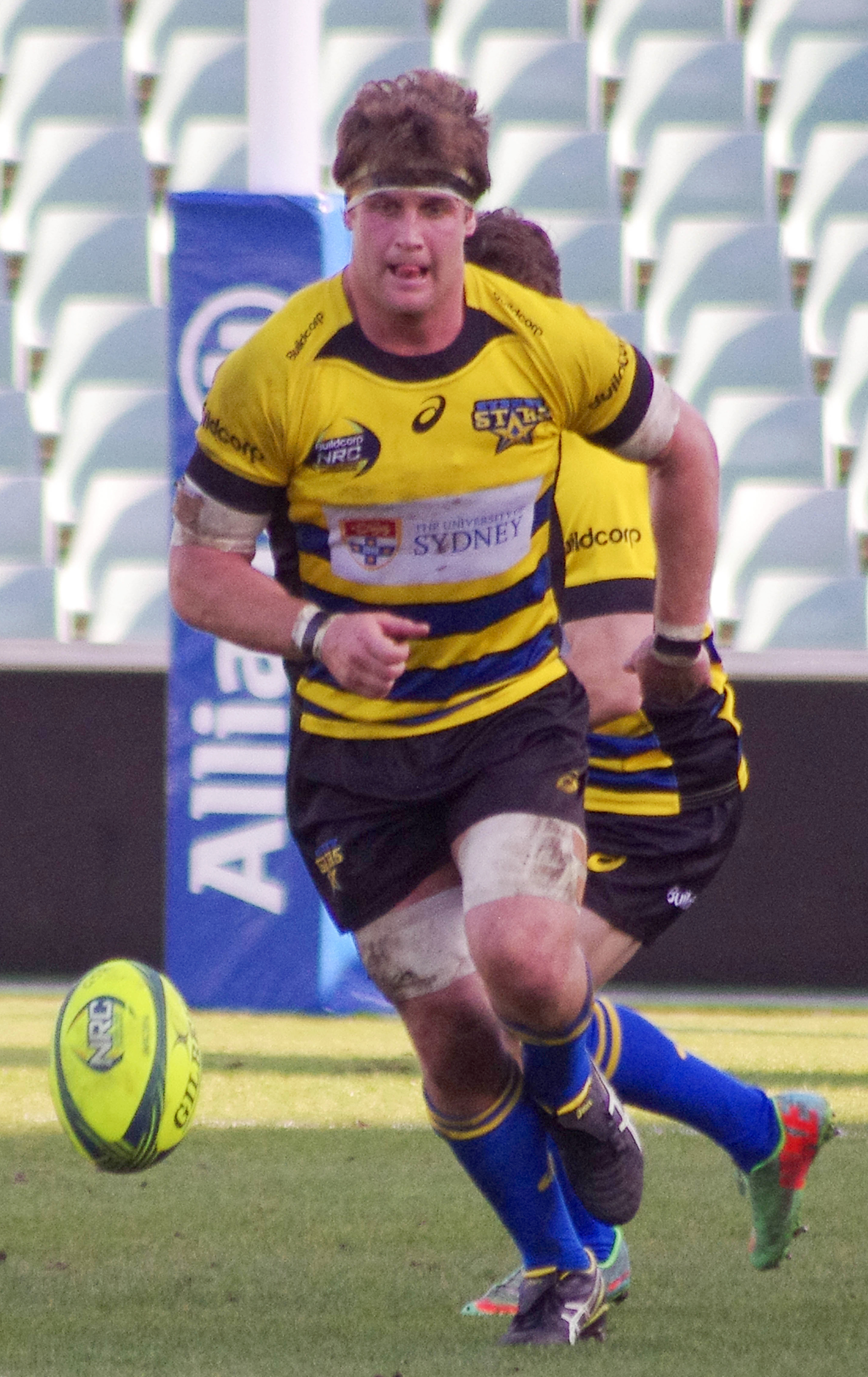
- McCutcheon in 2014
- Born: Patrick McCutcheon; 24 June 1987 (age 39) Narromine, New South Wales, Australia
- Height: 187 cm (6 ft 2 in)
- Weight: 105 kg (16 st 7 lb; 231 lb)
- School: St Joseph's College, Hunters Hill
- University: Sydney University

Rugby union career
- Position: Loose forward
Senior career
Years	Team	Apps	(Points)
2007	Sydney Fleet	5	(0)
2014−	Sydney Stars	8	(5)
- Correct as of 3 November 2015
Super Rugby
Years	Team	Apps	(Points)
2010–	Waratahs	35	(5)
- Correct as of 28 June 2015
International career
Years	Team	Apps	(Points)
2006	Australia U-19		
2005	Australia Schoolboys		
National sevens team
Years	Team		Comps
2007–10	Australia 7s		
Medal record
Men's rugby sevens
Representing Australia
Commonwealth Games
Silver medal – second place	2010 Delhi	Team competition

Patrick "Pat" McCutcheon (born 24 June 1987) is an Australia professional rugby union footballer. He plays for the New South Wales Waratahs in the Super Rugby competition, and his usual position is loose forward.

== Family and early life ==
McCutcheon was born and raised in the small New South Wales farming town of Narromine. He was educated at St. Joseph's College in Sydney, and he played in the Australian Schoolboys Rugby team in 2005. His brother Lachlan McCutcheon also represented Australia as a schoolboy, but did not gain representative honours at a senior level.

McCutcheon is married to Skye McCutcheon. He served as an ambassador for the Raise Foundation and Cure Brain Cancer Foundation, and is completing a program of Bachelor of Spatial Science and Surveying.

McCutcheon played for the Australian Under 19 team in 2006, and was selected for the Australian sevens team in 2007.

== Rugby career ==
McCutcheon made his debut for the Waratahs against the New Zealand Super 14 rugby team, the Otago Highlanders, in the 2010 Super 14 rugby season, as a flanker.

In October 2010, he was a member of the Australia Sevens Rugby Union team to win the silver medal at the 2010 Commonwealth Games taking place in Delhi, India. Australia lost to New Zealand in a closely fought final contest. He was appointed as captain of the Australian Sevens team for the 2009/10 IRB Series. McCutcheon toured Hong Kong and Europe with the Wallabies at the end of 2010, but did not play a Test.

In 2012, he broke his ankle in round three of Super Rugby, playing for the Waratahs against the Highlanders in Dunedin, ending his season. Later in November 2015 he had a hamstring injury that took him out of competitions until April 2016.
