= Sydney Stars =

Australian rugby union club, based in Sydney, NSW

- Union: Rugby Australia
- Founded: 2007 as "Sydney Fleet"
- Disbanded: 2015 (post season)
- Location: Sydney, Australia
- Ground: Leichhardt Oval
- League: National Rugby Championship
1st kit	2nd kit

The Sydney Stars is a former Australian rugby union football team that competed in the National Rugby Championship (NRC) in 2014 and 2015. The Stars team was established as a joint venture between the Sydney University and Balmain rugby clubs, and was one of four New South Wales teams in the competition.

The NRC was launched in 2014, reinstating the national competition after an absence of six years. Sydney University was initially interested in entering the NRC competition as a stand-alone club, but submitted a joint bid with Balmain as the Sydney Stars.

== History ==
The previous national competition was the Australian Rugby Championship (ARC), which was discontinued in 2007 after only one season. After setting up a consultative process in 2006 which culminated in a working session of some 70 delegates from around the country, the Australian Rugby Union announced that a new eight-team national competition would commence in 2007. New South Wales was allocated three teams and it was decided that representative teams would be formed to play out of the Central Coast, Western Sydney, and Sydney. The decision was controversial because two New South Wales clubs, Sydney University and Randwick, had wanted to enter stand-alone teams in the new competition.

=== Sydney Fleet (ARC team) ===
Sydney Fleet logo

Sydney Fleet colours (2007)

The Sydney Fleet was formed as one of three New South Wales teams to participate in the ARC. The Fleet's colors were blue and gold, the same colours used by past teams representing all of Sydney. The team's local rivals were the Western Sydney Rams and Central Coast Rays.

The logo of the Sydney Fleet featured a traditional anchor, similar to that on the Coat of arms of Sydney. The name, logo and team colours were revealed at the official launch of the team held aboard the museum ship HMAS Vampire at the Australian National Maritime Museum, in Darling Harbour on 27 February 2007.

Existing clubs aligned with the Sydney Fleet included Sydney University, Randwick, Eastern Suburbs and Southern Districts. The team played at North Sydney Oval which was also the home ground of the Northern Suburbs Rugby Club, although that club was aligned with the Central Coast Rays team for the ARC competition.

Head coach of the Sydney Fleet was Col "Snake" Jeffs, who was also the NSW Country head coach at the time. Former Wallaby and Waratah Scott Bowen (Easts head coach) and former Waratah and Italy Test lock Mark Giacheri (Randwick head coach) were the assistant coaches. Tim Davidson was the captain.

The Australian Rugby Championship was terminated at the end of 2007 after only one season of competition, with the Australian Rugby Union citing higher costs than budgeted and further projected financial losses. The Sydney Fleet team was disbanded with the end of the ARC competition.

=== National Rugby Championship ===
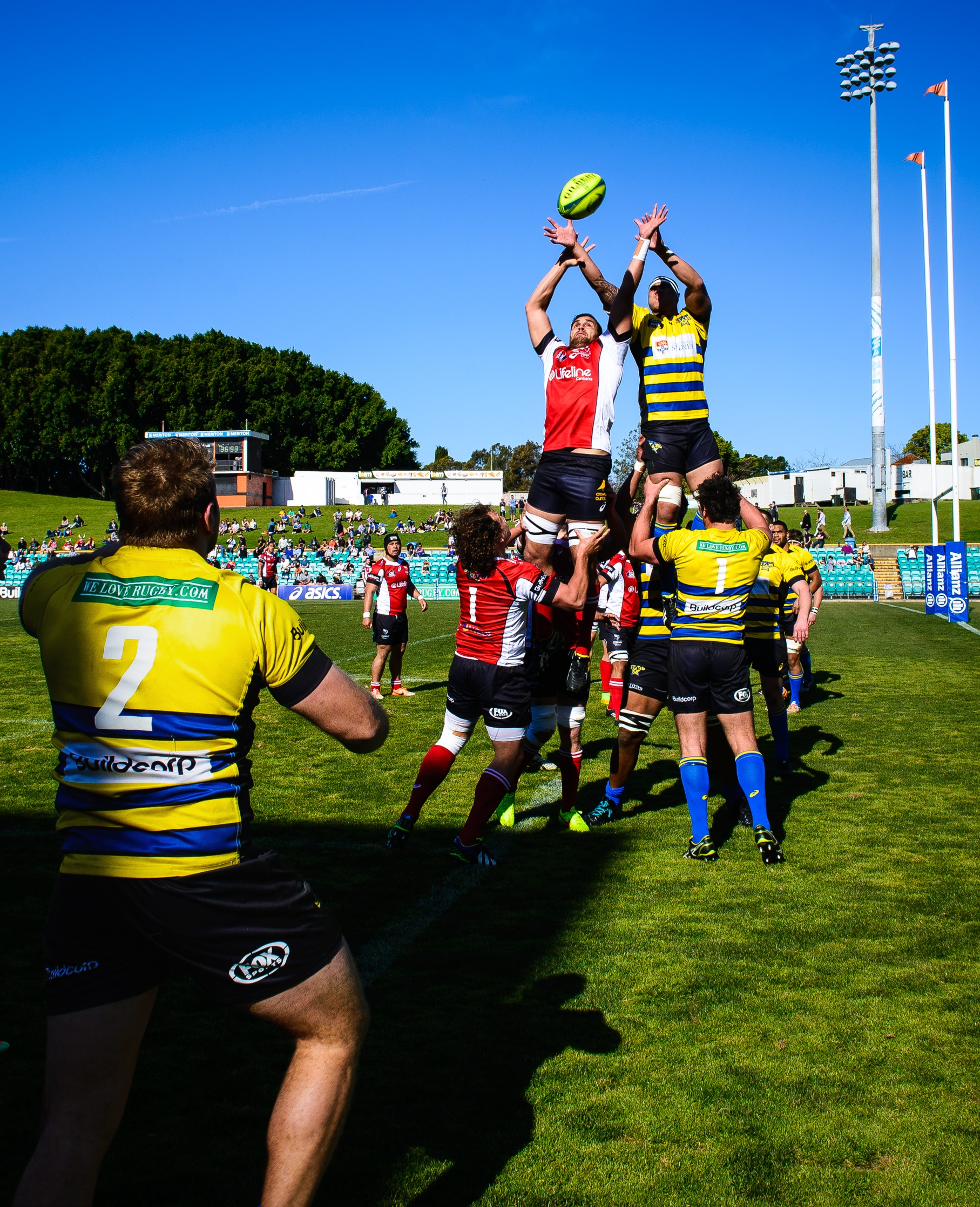
Tom Coolican throws in for Sydney in 2014

In December 2013, the ARU announced that the national competition was to be relaunched, with the National Rugby Championship (NRC) commencing in 2014. Expressions of interest were open to any interested parties, with the accepted bids finalised in early 2014. The Sydney University initially expressed interest in entering the NRC competition as a stand-alone club. However, a joint venture between Sydney University and Balmain rugby club (run by Sydney businessman Warren Livingstone, founder of the sports-tourism group Fanatics) was successful. On 24 March 2014 it was announced that the Sydney Stars team would play in the NRC competition.

Sydney University's coach Chris Malone was named as the head coach of the Sydney Stars for 2014, with Cameron Blades as forwards coach and Peter Playford as backs coach. Jack Farrar and Matt Dunning were appointed as support personnel. Pat McCutcheon was named as captain. Peter Playford became the head coach in 2016 and David Hickey was named captain. The team finished fourth in the regular season and played Brisbane City in a semifinal but lost by 47–32.

In 2016, the two-year licence for the Sydney Stars team to play in the NRC was not renewed, as the ARU had adjudged that the player talent available was not sufficient to support four competitive teams in New South Wales.

== Colours and logo ==
The Sydney Stars' colours of gold, blue and black was drawn from the rugby clubs of Sydney University and Balmain. The team logo was the name "Sydney" in blue capitals outlined in white above the name "Stars" in gold capitals outlined in blue, and with the central letter "A" formed as the top point of a large stylised five-pointed star. The entire design was outlined in black.

== Stadium ==
The home ground for the Sydney Stars was Leichhardt Oval, the long-term home of rugby league team, the Balmain Tigers and its descendant team the Wests Tigers playing in the NRL competition. The ground has primarily hosted rugby league and association football teams over the years.

== Records ==
=== Honours ===
- National Rugby Championship
  - Playoff appearances: 2015

=== Season standings ===
National Rugby Championship

Year	Pos	Pld	W	D	L	F	A	+/-	BP	Pts	Play-offs
2015	4th	8	4	0	4	241	314	−73	4	20	Semi-final loss to Brisbane City by 47–32.
2014	9th	8	1	1	6	211	356	−145	1	7	Did not compete

Australian Rugby Championship (Sydney Fleet)

Year	Pos	Pld	W	D	L	F	A	+/-	BP	Pts	Play-offs
2007	5th	8	4	0	4	212	244	−32	4	20	Did not compete

=== Head coaches ===
- Peter Playford (2015)
- Chris Malone (2014)
- Col "Snake" Jeffs (2007 – Syd. Fleet)

=== Captains ===
- David Hickey (2015)
- Pat McCutcheon (2014)
- Tim Davidson (2007 – Syd. Fleet)

=== Squads ===
2015 Sydney Stars squad – NRC
The squad for the 2015 National Rugby Championship season:
Props: Alasdair King; Tomas Robertson; Liam McGrath; Alastair Ryan; Paddy Ryan; Matthew Sandell; Jeremy Tilse; Hookers: Tom Coolican; James Hanson; Tolu Latu; Locks: David Dennis; Loma Kaveinga; Mathew Philip; Rohan O'Regan; Will Skelton^{1}	Loose forwards: Ofa Finau; David Hickey (c); Andrew Leota; Pat McCutcheon; Declan Moore; Jake Wainwright; Mitchell Whiteley; Scrum-halves: Richard Draper; Jake Gordon; Nick Phipps^{1}; Theo Strang; Fly-halves: Bernard Foley^{1}; Ben Hughes; Jordan McGregor	Centres: Tom Carter; John Hale; Andrew Robinson; Tom Kingston; Wingers: Henry Clunies-Ross; Harry Jones; Jim Stewart; Christian Yassmin; Fullbacks: Israel Folau^{1}; Guy Porter; Angus Roberts; 1. Test player outside of the contracted squad.

2014 Sydney Stars squad – NRC
The squad for the 2014 National Rugby Championship season:
Props: Alasdair King; Tomas Robertson; Paddy Ryan; Matthew Sandell; Jeremy Tilse; Michael Tyler; Laurie Weeks; Hookers: Tom Coolican; Folau Fainga'a; Tolu Latu; James Willan; Locks: Jordan Chapman; Byron Hodge; Loma Kaveinga; Matt Philip; Will Skelton^{1}; Ryan Wilson	Loose forwards: Hugo Dessens; David Hickey; Tipiloma Kaveinga; Pat McCutcheon (c); Benn Melrose; Samuel Quinn; Mitchell Whiteley; Scrum-halves: Jake Gordon; Jock Merriman; Nick Phipps^{1}; Angus Pulver; Fly-halves: Stuart Dunbar; Bernard Foley^{1}; Daniel Kelly	Centres: Tom Carter; Johnathan Fakai; Michael Hodge; Finau Makamaka; James McMahon; Wingers: Peter Betham; Henry Clunies-Ross; James Dargaville; Matthew Kenny; Jim Stewart; Jonny Loseli; Fullbacks: Israel Folau^{1}; Angus Roberts; 1. Test player outside of the contracted squad.

2007 Sydney Fleet squad – ARC
Props: Sean Baker (Randwick); Dayna Edwards (Randwick); Jeremy Tilse (Sydney Uni); Laurie Weeks (Sydney Uni); Hookers: Atonio Halangahu (Randwick); Daniel Lewinski (Sydney Uni); Todd Pearce (Eastwood); Sam Zlatevski (Easts); Locks: Adam Byrnes (Easts); Ed Brenac (Easts); Will Caldwell (Sydney Uni); Lachlan McCutcheon (Sydney Uni); Matthew Whittleston (Randwick)	Back row: Tim Davidson (Sydney Uni); Chris Houston (Randwick); Pat McCutcheon (Sydney Uni); Dean Mumm (Sydney Uni); Halfbacks: James Price (Randwick); Nathan Sievert (Sydney Uni); Josh Valentine (Manly); Flyhalves: Daniel Halangahu (Sydney Uni); Danny Kroll (Randwick)	Centres: Morgan Turinui (Randwick); Tom Azar (Easts); Tom Carter (Sydney Uni); Wings: Sanualio Afeaki (Sydney Uni); Andrew Barrett (Souths); Anton La Vin (Easts); Junior Puroku (Easts); Filipo Toala (Eastwood); Fullbacks: Gavin Debartolo (Easts); Arthur Little (Randwick)

== Gallery ==
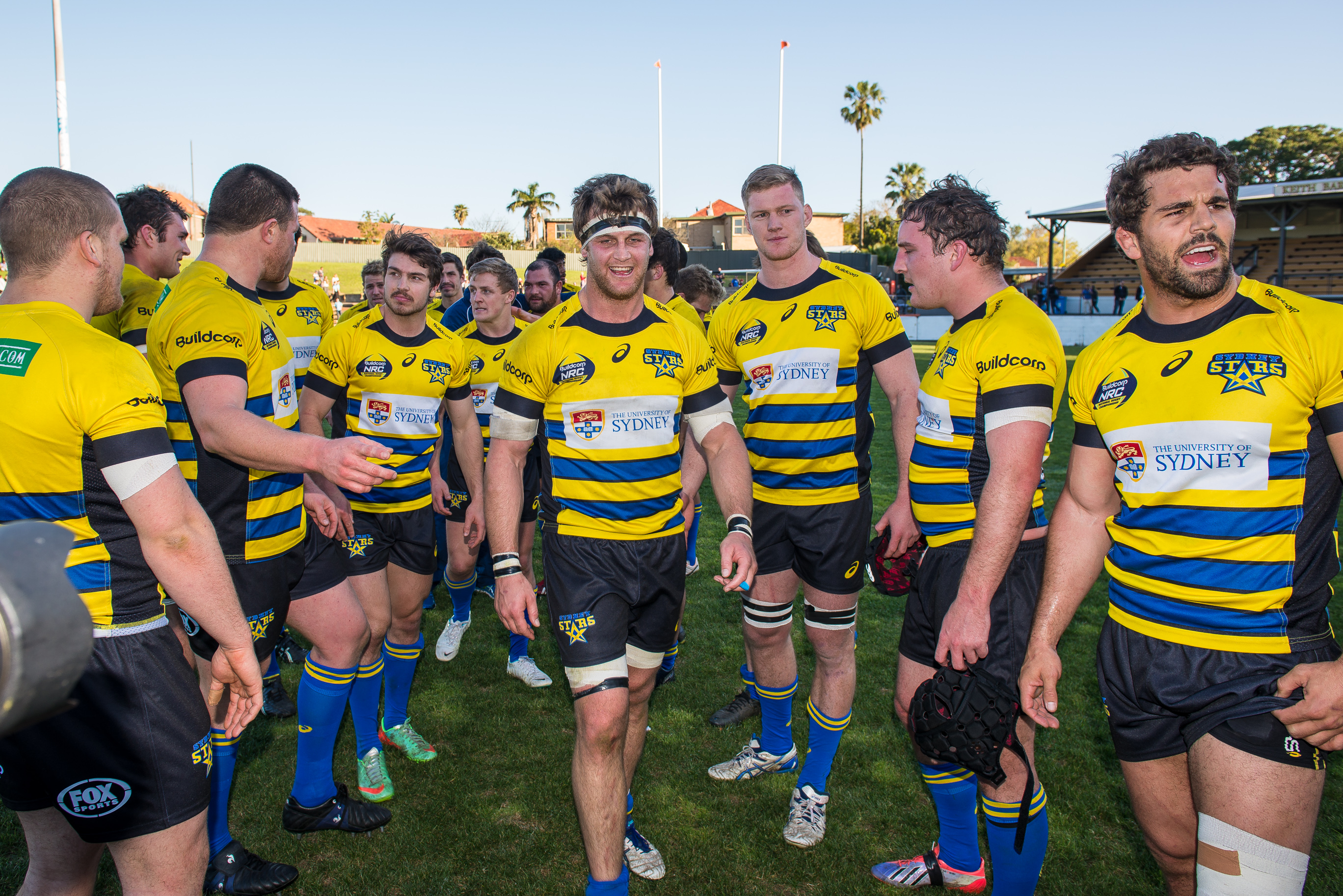
Sydney Stars exit the field post Round 5

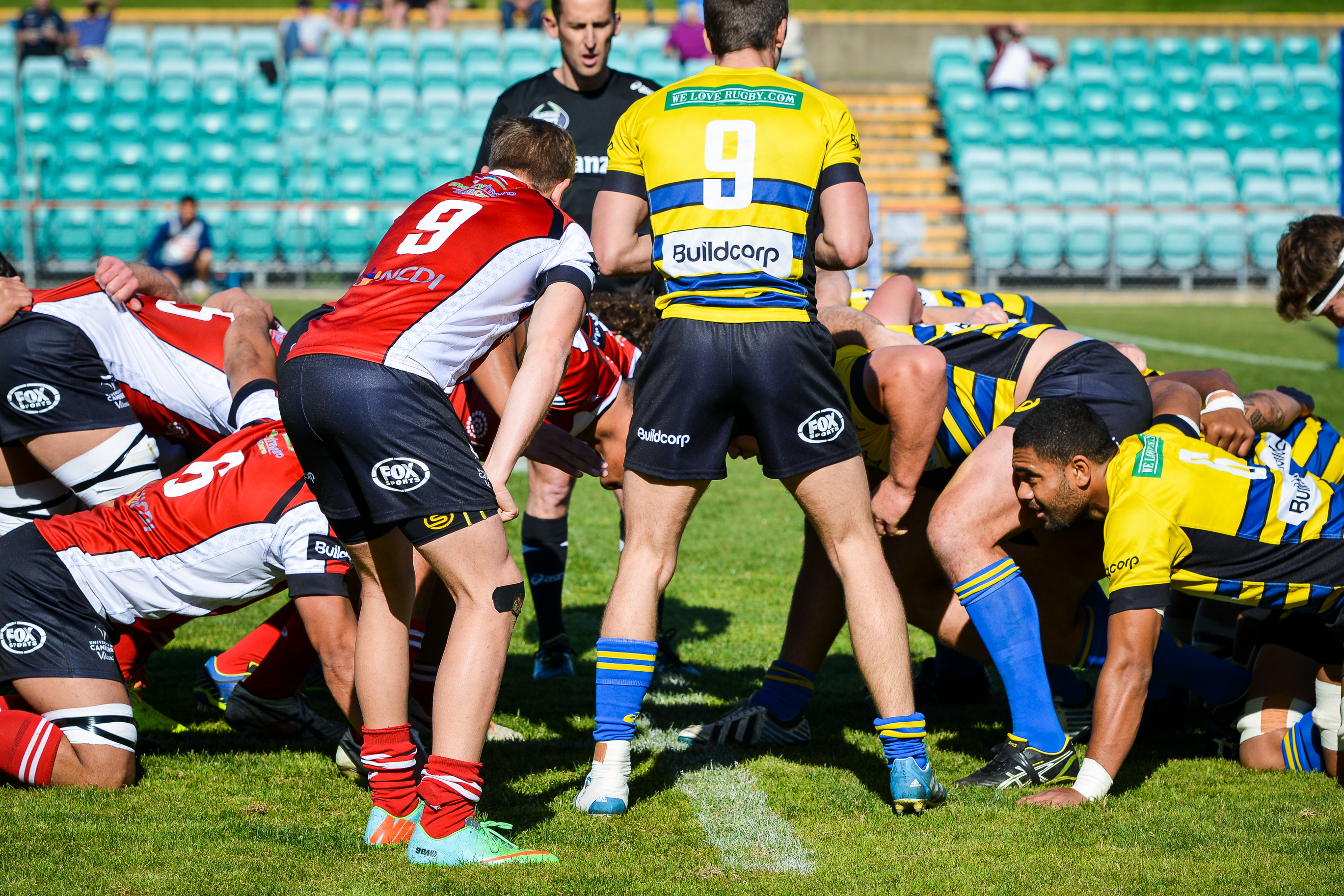
Sydney Stars feed the scrum

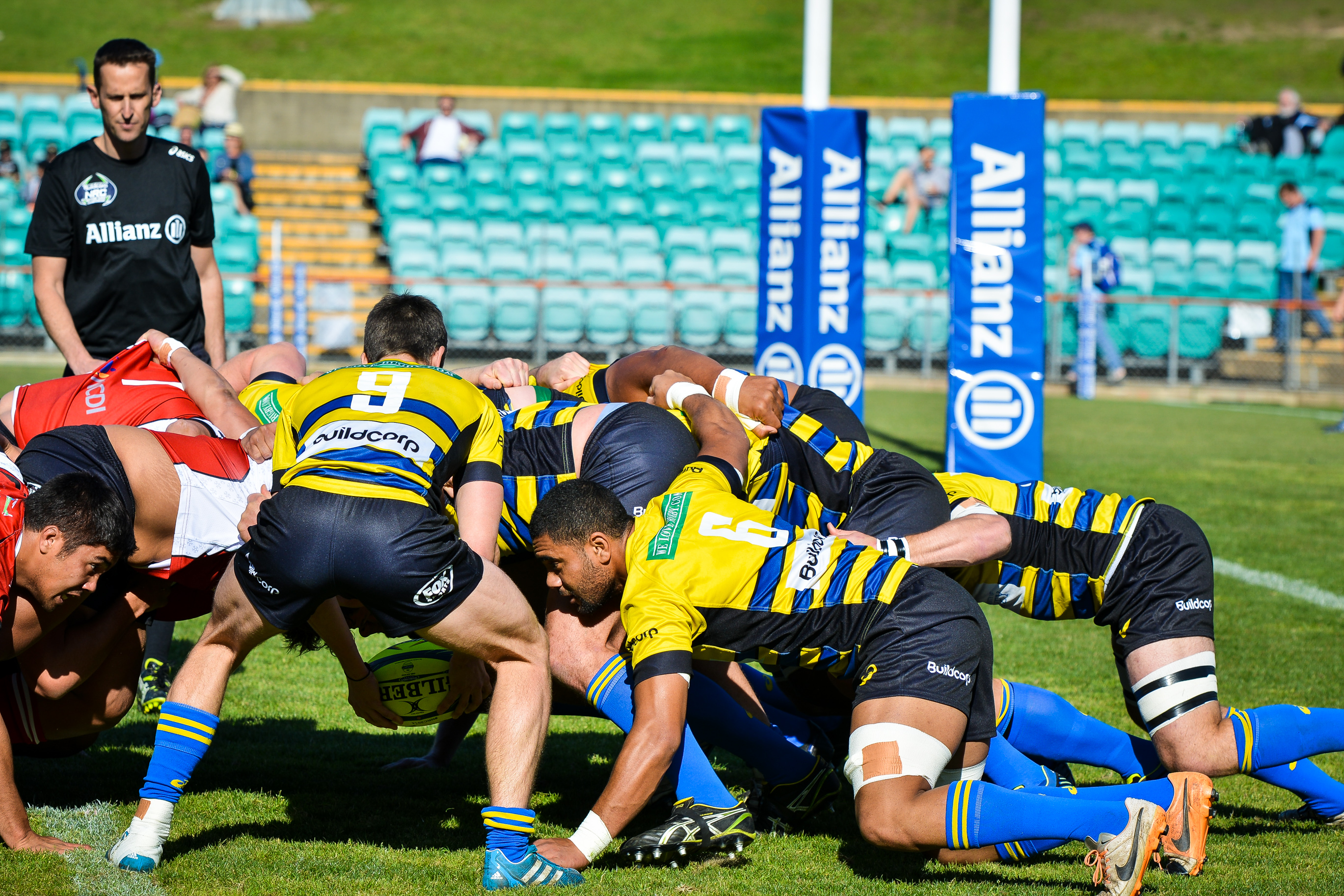
Sydney Stars scrum down

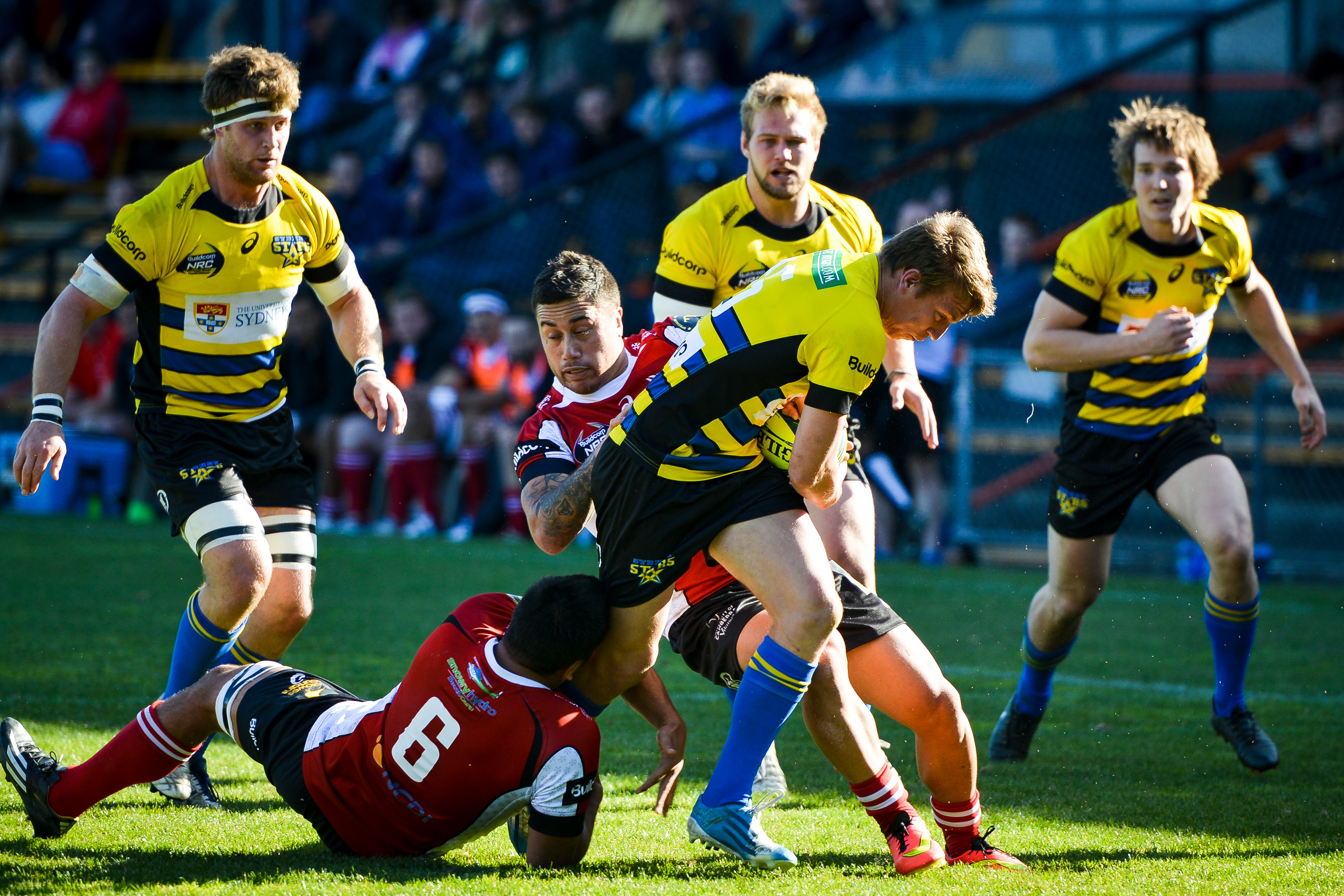
Sydney Stars tackled

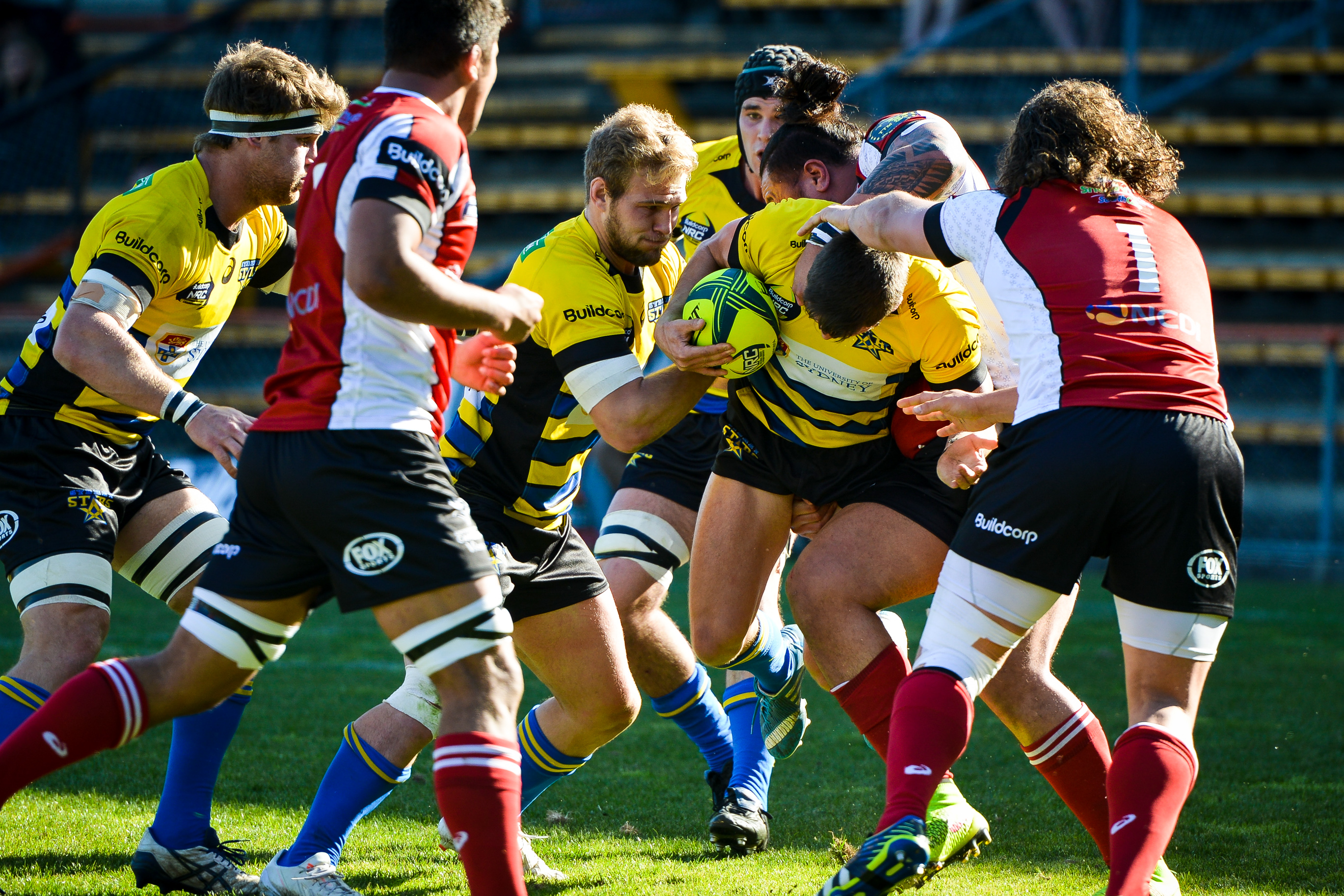
Sydney Stars under pressure

== See also ==
- New South Wales Rugby Union (NSWRU)
- New South Wales Waratahs
- Shute Shield
- Sydney Uni Football Club
- Balmain Rugby Club
