= Michael Hodge =

Former rugby union player/current coach

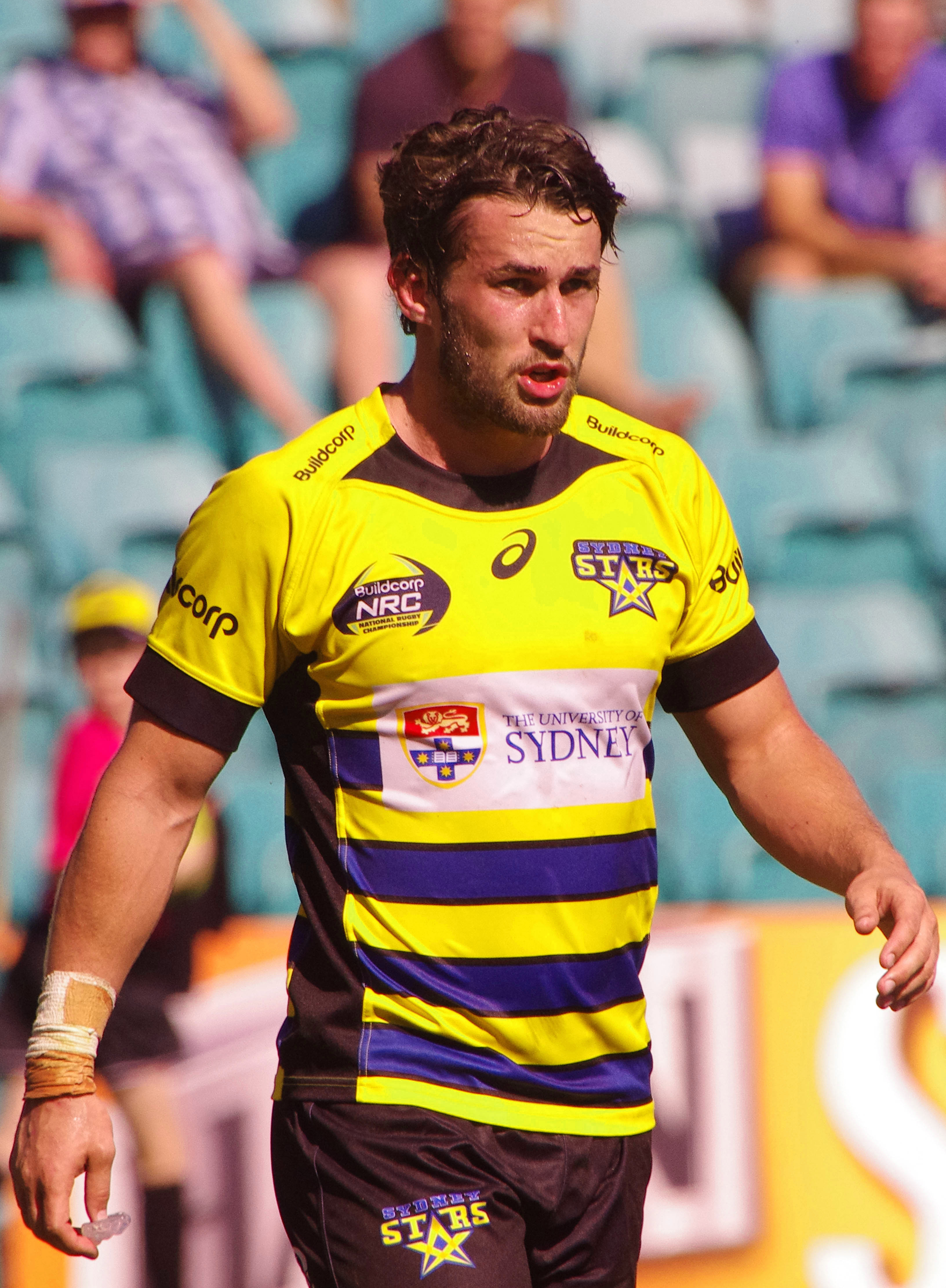
- Born: Michael Hodge; 27 May 1989 (age 37) Canberra, Australian Capital Territory, Australia
- Height: 1.83 m (6 ft 0 in)
- Weight: 90 kg (14 st 2 lb)

Rugby union career
- Position: Centre / Wing
Senior career
Years	Team	Apps	(Points)
2012−	Sydney University	70	(122)
2014−	Sydney Stars	7	(15)
- Correct as of 5 December 2014
Super Rugby
Years	Team	Apps	(Points)
2013–	Waratahs	0	(0)
- Correct as of 10 September 2012

Michael Hodge (born 27 May 1989) is a former rugby union player. His regular playing position was either wing or centre. He has represented Australia national rugby sevens team and was named in the Waratahs squad ahead of the 2013 Super Rugby season. Hodge accepted a position as Head Coach for the Dallas, Texas, US based Major League Rugby (MLR) franchise the Dallas Jackals in the spring of 2021. COVID-19-related visa delays meant that Hodge was unable to move to Texas before the MLR season was due to start, leading him to withdraw from the role.

== Amateur career ==
Hodge grew up in Canberra and joined the Sydney University Football Club as an 18-year-old in 2008. Prior to this, he was an under-eight with ACT junior side South Tuggernong. That year, the 1st Colts won an undefeated premiership and Hodge was awarded 1st Colts, Best and Fairest. He went on to play 70 1st Grade games, and in 2012 won his first Shute Shield Premiership and was awarded 1st Grade Players Player.

== Professional career ==
After professional rugby stints with the Australian Sevens team and the NSW Waratahs, Hodge retired from playing and took up a role as Senior Mathematics teacher and 1st XV Coach at Cranbrook School.

== Coaching career ==
Hodge then returned to the Sydney University Football Club in November 2018, as Director of Rugby. During his time he held additional coaching positions as U20s Head Coach, 1st Team Head Coach and Head of High Performance.

In spring 2021 he was appointed Head Coach of US Major League Rugby expansion team, the Dallas Jackals. Hodge began the role remotely from Australia, but was ultimately unable to enter the U.S. in time for the beginning of the season due to COVID-19-related visa processing delays.

The franchise did not win a game in their first season in the league.
