= Peter Betham =

Australia international rugby union player

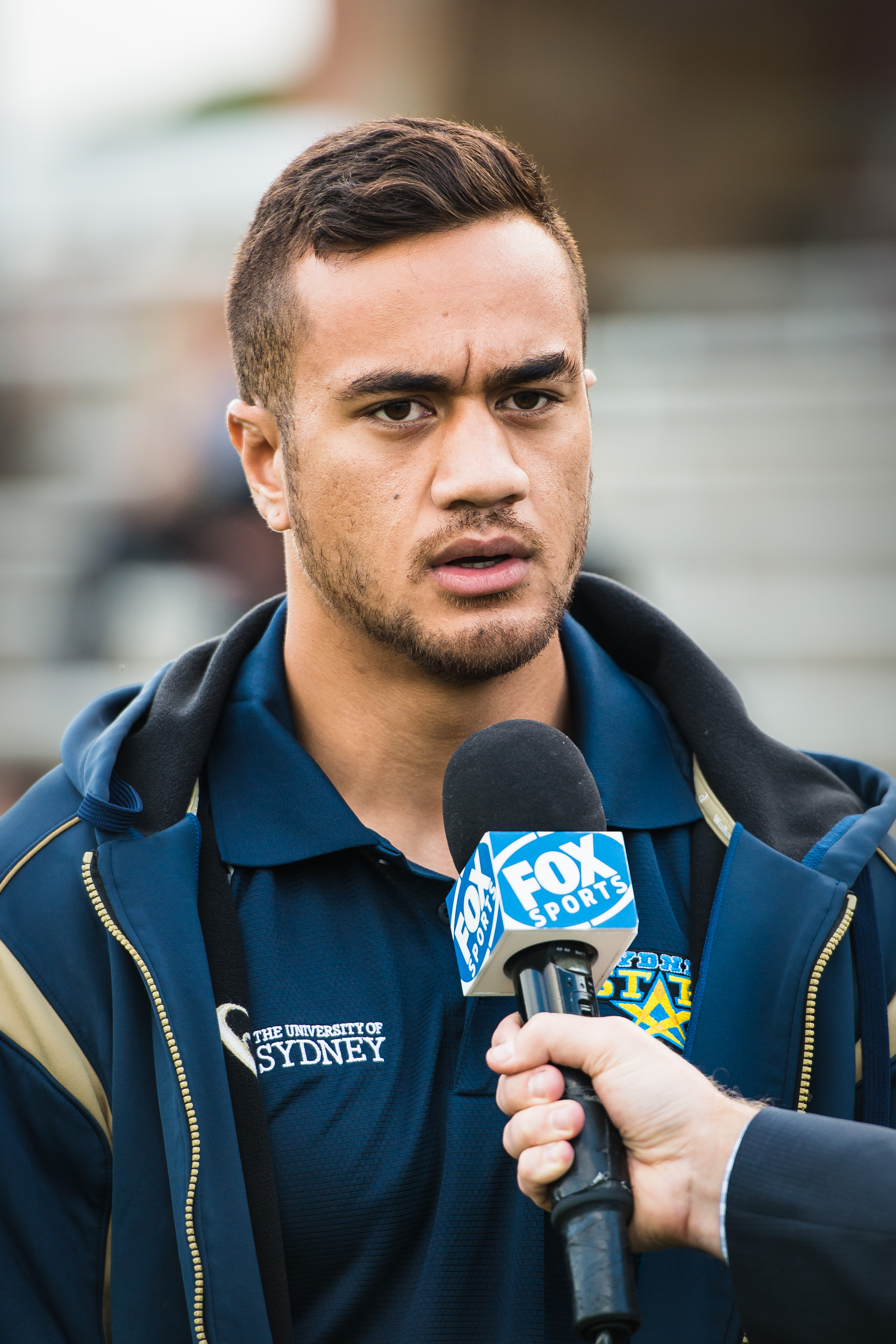
- Born: Peter Betham; 6 January 1989 (age 37) Wellington, New Zealand
- Height: 1.92 m (6 ft 3 1/2 in)
- Weight: 98 kg (15 st 6 lb)

Rugby union career
- Position(s): Wing, Centre
- Current team: Provence
Senior career
| Years | Team | Apps | (Points) |
| 2009 | ACT Brumbies | 0 | (0) |
| 2011 | Melbourne Rebels | 7 | (5) |
| 2012 | Tasman Makos | 11 | (30) |
| 2012–2015 | NSW Waratahs | 33 | (55) |
| 2013–2015 | Sydney University | 7 | (15) |
| 2014 | Sydney Stars | 1 | (0) |
| 2015–2017 | Leicester Tigers | 55 | (55) |
| 2017–2021 | Clermont Auvergne | 83 | (160) |
| 2021– | Provence | 27 | (10) |
| 2009– | Total | 224 | (330) |
- Correct as of 2 October 2022
International career
| Years | Team | Apps | (Points) |
| 2013 | Australia | 2 | (5) |
- Correct as of 28 November 2015

Peter Betham (born 6 January 1989) is a professional rugby union player for the Provence in the ProD2. He was a representative player for Australia in international rugby matches. His usual position is wing or fullback.

== Family and early career ==
Betham was born in Wellington, New Zealand, to parents of Samoan heritage. His family moved to Australia and he was brought up in Sydney where he started playing rugby league with the Coogee Randwick Wombats club at the age of 10. He played high school rugby for St. Joseph's College, Hunters Hill located on Sydney's Lower North Shore. He became friends with St. Joseph's teammate Kurtley Beale and for two years the pair backed up with Kensington in the South Sydney junior rugby league competition. Having attended a public primary school, Peter represented Sydney East PSSA at the State Championships in 2001 at Kiama. His teammate Rob Horne and Peter went on to represent NSW PSSA that year.

Betham played for NSW Schools in the 2005 National U16 Championship. He subsequently played for the Australia A Schools team that went on to beat New Zealand. In 2006 Betham toured Fiji and New Zealand with the Australian Schoolboys team.

In 2007 he played rugby while studying American history at Sydney University, he played rugby for Wesley College and was selected in the Australian U19 Rugby World Championship squad. He also became a holder of an Australian Institute of Sport (AIS) scholarship, one of 26.

== Rugby union career ==
Betham played for the Brumbies in the Super 14 competition, but injuries kept him off the field until mid 2009 when he rejoined Sydney University where he helped the club win the Sydney competition that year.

In 2010 he continued to play for Sydney Uni, and trained with the Waratahs' squad, as an "unsigned winger" and played in several Tahs' pre-season games.

In March 2010 Betham signed with the Melbourne Rebels for the 2011 Super Rugby season, with Rebels assistant coach Damian Hill describing him as "one of the most dynamic and athletic young backs" in Australian rugby.

He spent 2011 in Victoria before returning to NSW. In February 2012 Betham was named to play on the wing in the Tahs' pre-season match against Tonga.

In April 2015 Betham signed for Leicester Tigers. He will join them after the 2015 Super Rugby season finishes mid-2015. Betham marked his Tigers' debut with a try in their opening win of the season over London Irish in October 2015. The tigers have used Betham in both the outside centre role and on the wing.

In January 2017 Betham signed a new contract to stay at the club. In May 2017 Betham signed a contract with Clermont Auvergne for two years.

On 11 March 2021, Betham would leave Clermont to sign for Pro D2 side Provence ahead of the 2021-22 season.
