= List of Old Haleians =

Old Haleians are former students of Hale School, an Anglican Church school in Wembley Downs, a suburb of Perth, Western Australia.

== Royalty ==
- Sharafuddin Idris Shah – Sultan of Selangor, Malaysia
- Tunku Ismail Idris – Crown Prince of Johor

== Vice regal ==
- Sir Colin Hannah – Governor of Queensland
- Sir Stephen Parker – Lieutenant Governor of Western Australia

== Academia and science ==
- Kevin Cullen – doctor, winemaker
- George Winterton – Professor of Constitutional Law at the University of Sydney

== Arts ==
- Sam Roberts-Smith – operatic baritone

== Business ==
- John Bennison – general manager of Wesfarmers
- Alexander Forrest – landowner and developer, explorer
- Andrew Forrest – Chairman and CEO of Fortescue; philanthropist (also attended Christ Church Grammar School)
- Richard Goyder – CEO of Wesfarmers and chairman of Australian Football League
- Lang Hancock – asbestos and iron ore magnate
- E. A. "Peter" Wright – mining magnate
- Melvin Poh – media entrepreneur

== Law ==
=== Chief Justice ===
- Sir Stephen Parker – Chief Justice of Western Australia

=== Others – law ===
- Robert Nicholson – Justice of the Federal Court of Australia and the Supreme Court of Western Australia

== Media, entertainment, culture and the arts ==
- Robert Drewe – author, journalist (winner, Walkley Award)
- Edward Fiennes-Clinton, 18th Earl of Lincoln – author
- Robert Juniper – painter
- Edward Russell – television presenter
- Meyne Wyatt – actor, Redfern Now
- Basil Zempilas – television presenter, Lord Mayor of Perth, Western Australian Liberal Party leader

== Military ==
=== Victoria Cross recipient ===
- Ben Roberts-Smith – recipient of the Victoria Cross for Australia and Medal for Gallantry

=== Chiefs of services ===
- Sir Valston Hancock – Chief of the Air Staff, Royal Australian Air Force
- Sir Colin Hannah – Chief of the Air Staff, Royal Australian Air Force

=== Great Escape survivor ===
- Paul Royle – pilot

== Politics and public service ==
=== Premiers ===
- Richard Court, AC – Premier of Western Australia
- Hendy Cowan – Deputy Premier of Western Australia
- Peter Dowding – Premier of Western Australia (also attended Caulfield Grammar School and The Scots College)
- Sir John Forrest – first Premier of Western Australia
- Sir Walter Hartwell James – Premier of Western Australia
- George Leake – Premier of Western Australia
- Sir Ross McLarty – Premier of Western Australia

=== Ministers ===
- Septimus Burt – Attorney-General, Western Australia
- Thomas Davy – Attorney-General, Minister for Education, Western Australia
- Sir Victor Garland – Minister in various portfolios, McMahon Ministry and Second and Third Fraser Ministries, Australia
- Bill Hassell – Minister in various portfolios, Court Ministry, Western Australia
- Christian Porter – Minister in various portfolios, Barnett Ministry, Western Australia

=== Other members of parliament ===
- Brian Greig – Australian Senator for Western Australia, Leader of the Australian Democrats
- Hugh Guthrie – Member of the Western Australian Legislative Assembly and Speaker of the Legislative Assembly
- Edward Bertram Johnston – Member of the Western Australian Legislative Council and Australian Senator for Western Australia
- Anthony Trethowan – Member of the Western Australian Legislative Assembly, clergyman
- Charles Wittenoom – Member of the Western Australian Legislative Council

=== Others – politics and public service ===
==== Diplomatic officers ====
- Sir Victor Garland – Australian High Commissioner to the United Kingdom
- Bill Hassell – Agent-General for Western Australia, London; Consul-General for Germany, Western Australia
- David Irvine – Australian High Commissioner to Papua New Guinea; Australian Ambassador to China and concurrently Ambassador to Mongolia and North Korea
- Sir Walter Hartwell James – Agent-General for Western Australia, London
- Sir Edward Wittenoom – Consul-General for France, Western Australia

==== Mayors ====
- Dan Bull – Mayor of the City of Bayswater
- Peter Nattrass – Lord Mayor of the City of Perth
- Charles Veryard – Lord Mayor of the City of Perth
- Charles Wittenoom – Mayor of Albany Municipal Council
- Basil Zempilas – Lord Mayor of the City of Perth

== Sport ==
=== Australian rules football ===
Old Haleians playing in the Australian Football League include:

- Michael Gardiner – West Coast Eagles, St Kilda Saints, played in AFL Grand Final, 2009
- Kasey Green – West Coast Eagles, North Melbourne Kangaroos
- Brett Jones – West Coast Eagles
- Chad Jones – AFL player (West Coast Eagles, North Melbourne Kangaroos)
- Matthew Leuenberger – Brisbane Lions
- Paul Medhurst – Fremantle Dockers, Collingwood Magpies, Anzac Day Medal winner, 2008
- Cale Morton – Melbourne Demons, West Coast Eagles, Larke Medal winner, 2007
- Jarryd Morton – Hawthorn Hawks
- Mitchell Morton – West Coast Eagles, Richmond Tigers, Sydney Swans
- Jason Norrish – Melbourne Demons, Fremantle Dockers
- Tom Mitchell – Sydney Swans, Hawthorn Hawks, Brownlow Medal winner, 2018
- Nick Kommer – Essendon Bombers
- Michael Clark – Fremantle Dockers, Collingwood Magpies
- Michael Evans – Melbourne Demons
- Tom Barrass – West Coast Eagles
- Michael Aitken – Carlton Blues
- Digby Morrell – North Melbourne Kangaroos, Carlton Blues
- Adam Lange – North Melbourne Kangaroos
- Cameron Venables – Collingwood Magpies
- Clancy Rudeforth – West Coast Eagles
- Tim Gepp – Richmond Tigers, Western Bulldogs
- Mitch Georgiades – Port Adelaide Football Club
- Darcy Cameron – Collingwood Football Club
- Shane McAdam – Adelaide Football Club
- Kyron Hayden – North Melbourne Football Club
- Jy Farrar – Gold Coast Suns

=== Cricket ===
- Geoff Marsh – international player (Australia) and coach (Australia, Zimbabwe, Pune Warriors India and Sri Lanka)
- Theo Doropoulos – state player (Western Australia, South Australia)
- Marcus Stoinis – state player (Western Australia)
- Michael Clark – state player (Western Australia)
- David Bandy – state player (Western Australia)
- Arthur Lodge – state player (Western Australia)

=== Golf ===
- Curtis Luck – US Amateur Golf Champion 2016

=== Hockey ===
- Mark Hickman – international player (Australia), including at the Champions Trophy (1996, 1998, 2000, 2001, 2002, 2003), Commonwealth Games (1998 (gold medallist) and 2002 (gold medallist)) and World Hockey Cup (2002 (silver medallist))

=== Olympics ===
- Mark Hickman – hockey (Australian team), Athens 2004 (gold medallist)
- Percy Oliver – swimming (Australian team), Berlin 1936
- Todd Pearson – swimming (Australian team), Sydney 2000 (gold medallist) and Athens 2004 (silver medallist)
- Deane Pieters – swimming (Australian team) Barcelona 1992
- Nick Porzig – rowing (Australian VIII), Sydney 2000 (silver medallist)
- Rolly Tasker – sailing (Australian team), Melbourne 1956 (silver medallist) and Rome/Naples 1960
- Sam McEntee – Athletics (Australian team), Rio de Janeiro 2016

=== Rugby Union ===
- Dane Haylett-Petty
- Ross Haylett-Petty
- Luke Burton
- Ryan Hodson
- Justin Turner
- Nick Jooste
- Carlo Tizzano

=== Sailing ===
- Rolly Tasker – international sailor; winner A-division, Fastnet race, 1979; line honours and winner IOR division, Parmelia Yacht Race
- John Longley – Project Manager and crewman of Australia II, winner of the 1983 America's Cup

== See also ==
- List of schools in Western Australia
- List of boarding schools
- Public Schools Association
