= 1887 All-Ireland Senior Football Championship final =

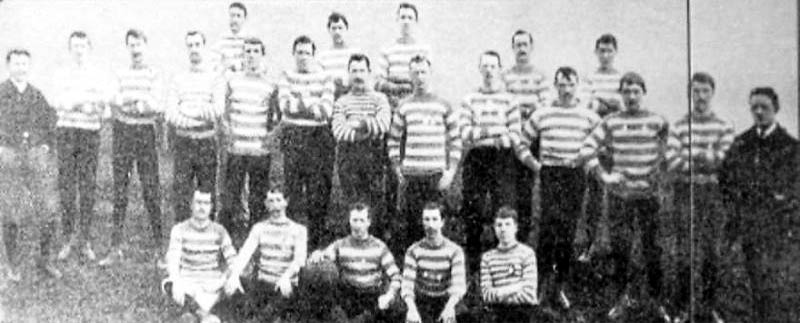
- Limerick, champions
- Event: 1887 All-Ireland Senior Football Championship
Limerick	Louth
1–4 (7)	0–3 (3)
- Date: 29 April 1888
- Venue: Beech Hill, Donnybrook, Dublin
- Referee: John Cullinane (Tipperary)

The 1887 All-Ireland Senior Football Championship final was the first All-Ireland Final and the culmination of the 1887 All-Ireland Senior Football Championship, an inter-county Gaelic football tournament for the top teams in Ireland. Limerick were the winners. It was the first of two All-Ireland football titles for Limerick - the other coming in 1896.

In 2005, a gold medal won by the final's man-of-the-match Malachi O'Brien fetched €26,500 (three times its guide price) at London auction house Sotheby's. It was believed to be the oldest All-Ireland football medal in existence. The Limerick Leader purchased the medal and said it intended to display it in Limerick.

In June 2023 another medal, awarded to Limerick midfielder Jeremiah Kennedy, was sold at a Dublin auction for €32,000. The victorious Limerick team did not receive their medals until 1910.

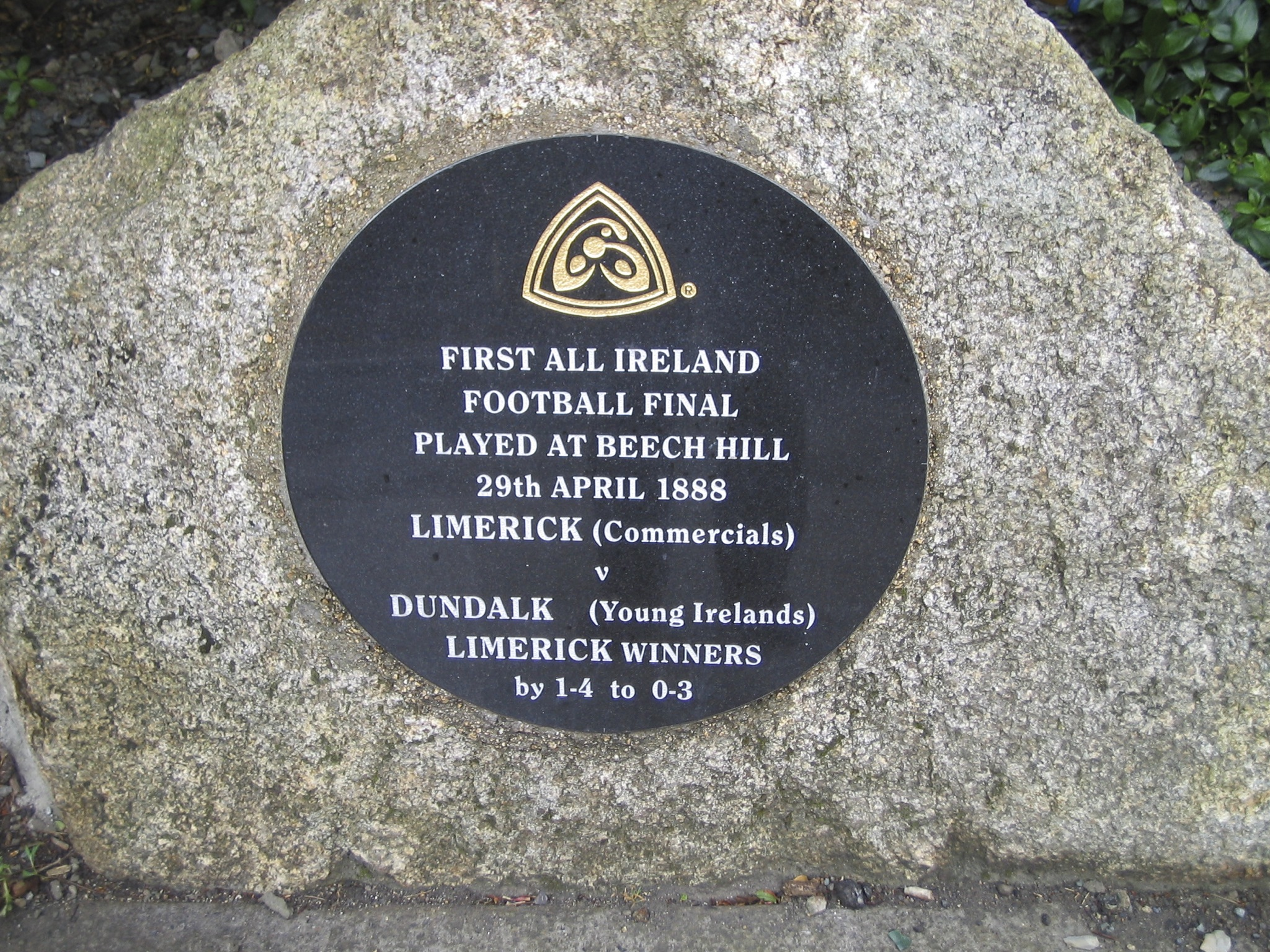
Plaque commemorating the match close to Beech Hill, Dublin

== Match ==
=== Summary ===
The 21 per side final was held at O'Byrne's field at Beech Hill, Donnybrook, which was then the home of Dublin club Benburbs.

Louth was represented by county champions Dundalk Young Irelands, with the Limerick side composed of members of Limerick Commercials, who had won the Limerick county championship.

Playing with the aid of the wind in the first half, Louth led by two points at the interval. Jim Keating was the first player to register a score in an All-Ireland football final. In the second half, the first ever goal in a final was scored by William Spain. The Treaty men went on to win by four points. Gate receipts for the match came to £300.

=== Details ===
29 April 1888

Limerick	1–4 – 0–3	Louth
(HT: 0–1 – 0–3)

Limerick
Louth

1	Denis Corbett (gk) (c)
2	Tim Fitzgibbon
3	William Gunning
4	Richard Breen
5	John Hyland
6	Thomas McNamara
7	William Spain
8	Pat Corbett
9	Michael Slattery
10	Jeremiah Kennedy
11	Michael Casey
12	James Mulqueen
13	Malachi O'Brien
14	Patrick Kelly
15	Tim Kennedy
16	Philip Keating
17	William Cleary
18	Robert Normoyle
19	Pat Reeves
20	Thomas Keating
21	Tom McMahon

1	Edward Feeley (gk)
2	Pat Clarke
3	John Dowdall
4	Henry Fagan
5	Jack Connor
6	John McCrave
7	Pat McGuinness
8	Tom Murphy
9	Edward Murphy
10	Tom O'Rourke
11	William Whately
12	Arthur O'Hagan
13	Michael Carroll (c)
14	Pat Morgan
15	Edward Goodman
16	John Maguire
17	Jim Keating
18	James Campbell
19	Pat McGinn
20	Peter Jackson
21	Tom Lavery
Substitute:
22	Sam Keating
