= Slattery =

Slattery is a surname of Irish origin. The name is an anglicisation of the Irish: Ó Slatara or Ó Slatraigh, meaning 'descendant of slatra' meaning 'robust', 'strong', 'bold'. The name originated in the townland of Ballyslattery in the barony of Tulla Upper in east County Clare, Ireland.

The Slattery coat of arms which shows three red submissive lions against a white background indicates a family that are magnanimous in warfare and yet kind and warm in peacetime.

Notable people named Slattery include:

- Bevan Slattery, Australian technology entrepreneur
- Brian Slattery, Canadian law professor
- Edward James Slattery (1940–2024), American Roman Catholic bishop
- Fergus Slattery (1949–2026), Irish rugby union player
- Harry A. Slattery (1887–1949), American lawyer and public official
- Henry Slattery (born 1986), Australian football player
- Jack Slattery (1878–1949), American baseball player
- James M. Slattery (1878–1948), American politician from Colorado
- Jim Slattery (born 1948), American politician from Kansas
- Jimmy Slattery (1904–1960), American professional boxer
- John Henry Slattery (died 1933), American politician from Colorado
- John Slattery (born 1962), American actor
- Joseph Patrick Slattery (1866–1931), Australian physicist, radiologist, Catholic priest
- Margaret Patrice Slattery (1926–2024), American college president and religious sister
- Martin Slattery (born 1973), British musician
- Michael Slattery (disambiguation), several people
  - Michael Slattery (bishop) (1783–1857), Irish priest
  - Michael Slattery (hurler), Irish hurler
  - Michael Slattery (Gaelic footballer) (1866–1960), Irish Gaelic footballer
  - Michael Slattery (admiral) (born 1954), Australian judge from New South Wales
  - Mike Slattery (baseball) (1866–1904), Major League Baseball player
  - Mike Slattery (politician) (born 1981), American politician from Kansas (son of Jim Slattery)
- Pearl Slattery (born 1989), Irish football coach and player
- Richard X. Slattery (1925–1997), American actor
- Ryan Slattery, American film and television actor
- Tadhg Slattery, South African swimmer who competed in six Paralympic Games
- Tony Slattery (1959–2025), English actor and comedian
- Troy Slattery (born 1973), Australian rugby league footballer

Fictional characters with the name Slattery include:

- Trevor Slattery, a character in the Marvel Cinematic Universe

== See also ==
- Slattery Report, 1939–40 report into Alaskan development through immigration
- Slattery's Hurricane, 1949 American film
- Slattery's People, 1964–65 American television series
- "Slattery's Mounted Foot", 1889 comic song by the Irish musician Percy French
