= Michael Slattery =

Michael or Mike Slattery may refer to:

- Michael Slattery (bishop) (1783–1857), Irish priest
- Michael Slattery (hurler), Irish hurler
- Michael Slattery (Gaelic footballer) (1866–1960), Irish Gaelic footballer
- Michael Slattery (admiral) (born 1954), Justice of the Supreme Court of New South Wales and Judge Advocate General of the Australian Defence Force
- Mike Slattery (baseball) (1866–1904), Major League Baseball player
- Mike Slattery (politician) (born 1981), Democratic member of the Kansas House of Representatives
- Mike Slattery, a character in the TV series The Last Ship
