= Richard Tracey (judge) =

Australian judge and barrister (1948–2019)

Major General The Honourable Richard Tracey AM, RFD, QC

Judge of the Federal Court of Australia
- In office 24 July 2006 – 17 August 2018

6th Judge Advocate General
- In office 26 September 2007 – 29 July 2014
- Preceded by: Len Roberts-Smith
- Succeeded by: Michael Slattery

Personal details
- Born: Richard Ross Sinclair Tracey; 18 August 1948 Melbourne, Victoria, Australia
- Died: 11 October 2019 (aged 71) California, United States
- Education: Melbourne High School; Newman College (University of Melbourne); University of Illinois
- Profession: Judge, barrister

Military service
- Allegiance: Australia
- Branch/service: Australian Army
- Years of service: 1975–2014
- Rank: Major General
- Unit: Australian Army Legal Corps
- Awards: Member of the Order of Australia; Reserve Force Decoration

Richard Ross Sinclair Tracey AM, RFD, QC (18 August 1948 – 11 October 2019) was an Australian military and civil judge and barrister, who was Judge Advocate General of the Australian Defence Force from 2007 to 2014, and a judge of the Federal Court of Australia from 2006 to 2018. Following his retirement from the Federal Court, Tracey was appointed as a commissioner of the Royal Commission into Aged Care Quality and Safety, however he died of cancer before the commission provided its interim report.

In the 2014 Australia Day Honours Tracey was made a Member of the Order of Australia for "exceptional service in the field of military law, as a consultant for the Director of Army Legal Services, and as Judge Advocate General of the Australian Defence Force".

Military offices
| Preceded by Len Roberts-Smith | Judge Advocate General; 2007–2014 | Succeeded by Michael Slattery |
