= List of WAFL wooden spoons =

The wooden spoon is the imaginary and ironic "award" which is said to be won by the team finishing in last place in the West Australian Football League. No physical wooden spoon award exists, other than those brought by opposition fans to taunt struggling teams, nor is such an award officially sanctioned by the WAFL. However, most betting agencies will take wagers on the wooden spoon.

West Perth with a record of 7 win and 14 losses in the 1992 season, have the highest numbers of wins out of all wooden spoon teams since the start of the competition in 1885.

Perth with a percentage of 92.13% (from 6 wins and 9 losses) in the 1921 season, has the highest percentage out of all wooden spoon teams since the start of the competition in 1885.

As from the 2025 season, the West Coast reserves received a 5th consecutive wooden spoon. This is the most consecutive wooden spoons a club has received in WAFL history.

== Criteria ==
The team which finishes on the bottom of the ladder wins the wooden spoon. This is determined by:

- Fewest premiership points (four points for a win, two points for a draw)
- Lowest percentage (the ratio of points for to points against if on same numbers of points) (1898–Present)

No countback exists if teams finish equal on points but with a different number of wins.

=== 1885–1897 ===
From 1885 to 1897 teams on the ladder were ranked by competition points, then match points differential (for and against). From 1885 to 1896 only goals scored were included in the total score, and teams were awarded two points for a win and one point for a draw.

High School withdrew from the competition due to lack of players two rounds into the inaugural season, and therefore are the inaugural "winners" of the wooden spoon.

== Wooden spoons by season ==
Season	Wooden spoon	Wins	Losses	Draws	Game Difference/ Percentage (%)	Points
Game Difference decides ladder position
1885	High School	0	1	0	-4	0
1886	Unions	2	7	0	-17	4
1887	West Australian	2	6	0	-7	4
1888	West Australian (2)	1	7	1	-14	3
1889	Metropolitan	1	6	3	-9	5
1890	Rovers	3	4	2	-8	8
1891	East Perth (I)	1	9	2	-32	4
1892	East Perth (I) (2)	0	12	0	-67	0
1893	Rovers (2)	0	12	0	-39	0
1894	Rovers (3)	2	9	1	-37	5
1895	West Perth	2	13	0	-67	4
1896	Rovers (4)	3	11	2	-54	8
1897	Rovers (5)	1	7	2	-24	4
Percentage decides ladder position
1898	East Fremantle	1	15	0	51.76	4
1899	Rovers (6)	0	8	0	37.82	0
1900	Perth	2	10	0	82.37	8
1901	Subiaco	4	11	0	52.19	16
1902	Subiaco (2)	0	15	0	37.44	0
1903	Subiaco (3)	1	14	0	35.02	4
1904	South Fremantle	1	14	0	35.02	4
1905	Subiaco (4)	0	10	0	21.09	0
1906	Subiaco (5)	1	16	0	40.75	4
1907	Subiaco (6)	2	15	0	47.34	4
1908	Subiaco (7)	2	14	1	52.44	10
1909	Midland Junction	1	15	1	46.00	6
1910	Midland Junction (2)	3	14	0	53.05	6
1911	East Perth	2	10	0	59.31	8
1912	Perth (2)	2	10	0	75.29	8
1913	East Perth (2)	2	10	0	68.46	8
1914	North Fremantle	1	13	0	59.35	4
1915	North Fremantle (2)	1	20	0	43.32	4
1916	Subiaco (8)	2	10	0	65.59	8
1917	Midland Junction (3)	0	12	0	29.02	0
1918	West Perth (2)	2	13	0	48.11	8
1919	West Perth (3)	3	12	0	55.01	12
1920	South Fremantle (2)	3	12	0	79.12	12
1921	Perth (3)	6	9	0	92.13	24
1922	Perth (4)	3	11	0	76.20	12
1923	Perth (5)	1	12	1	67.82	6
1924	West Perth (4)	3	12	0	84.23	12
1925	South Fremantle (3)	3	11	1	68.81	14
1926	Claremont-Cottesloe^{[a]}	1	17	0	55.59	4
1927	Claremont-Cottesloe (2)	1	17	0	61.92	4
1928	Claremont-Cottesloe (3)	5	13	0	86.48	20
1929	East Perth (3)	2	16	0	66.52	8
1930	West Perth (5)	6	11	1	90.47	26
1931	Claremont-Cottesloe (4)	3	15	0	72.21	12
1932	Claremont-Cottesloe (5)	4	14	0	72.32	16
1933	Claremont-Cottesloe (6)	5	13	0	80.83	20
1934	Claremont-Cottesloe (7)	2	19	0	56.34	8
1935	Victoria Park^{[b]} (6)	4	14	0	81.15	16
1936	South Fremantle (4)	6	14	0	86.05	24
1937	Subiaco (9)	4	17	0	76.53	16
1938	West Perth (6)	3	17	0	76.62	12
1939	West Perth (7)	1	19	0	59.22	4
1940	Swan Districts	2	18	0	57.72	8
1941	Swan Districts (2)	3	17	0	70.44	12
1942	Perth (7)	3	9	0	64.72	12
1943	South Fremantle (5)	4	13	0	51.97	16
1944	South Fremantle (6)	0	19	0	28.00	0
1945	Claremont (8)	2	18	0	57.77	8
1946	Claremont (9)	3	16	0	68.45	12
1947	Subiaco (10)	3	16	0	74.48	12
1948	Swan Districts (3)	2	17	0	58.59	8
1949	Subiaco (11)	2	16	0	68.11	8
1950	Subiaco (12)	5	16	0	67.78	20
1951	Swan Districts (4)	1	20	0	64.12	4
1952	Swan Districts (5)	2	18	0	50.84	8
1953	Subiaco (13)	2	19	0	55.38	8
1954	Subiaco (14)	4	16	0	67.82	16
1955	Subiaco (15)	4	16	0	68.98	16
1956	Swan Districts (6)	4	15	0	83.59	16
1957	Swan Districts (7)	4	17	0	77.41	16
1958	Claremont (10)	2	19	0	54.56	8
1959	Swan Districts (8)	5	16	0	80.88	20
1960	Swan Districts (9)	2	19	0	67.72	8
1961	South Fremantle (7)	5	16	0	81.63	20
1962	Claremont (11)	4	17	0	72.65	16
1963	Claremont (12)	4	17	0	79.60	16
1964	East Perth (4)	3	18	0	70.85	12
1965	South Fremantle (8)	5	15	1	81.83	22
1966	South Fremantle (9)	6	15	0	79.60	24
1967	Subiaco (16)	3	18	0	75.53	12
1968	Swan Districts (10)	1	20	0	63.93	4
1969	South Fremantle (10)	5	16	0	77.10	20
1970	Swan Districts (11)	4	17	0	69.77	16
1971	Swan Districts (12)	4	16	1	72.08	18
1972	South Fremantle (11)	6	15	0	83.22	24
1973	Claremont (13)	4	17	0	88.08	16
1974	West Perth (8)	6	15	0	86.43	24
1975	Claremont (14)	3	18	0	67.93	12
1976	Subiaco (17)	4	17	0	64.04	16
1977	Swan Districts (13)	3	18	0	70.07	12
1978	Swan Districts (14)	4	17	0	75.11	16
1979	Subiaco (18)	3	18	0	61.91	12
1980	Subiaco (19)	2	19	0	59.37	8
1981	Perth (8)	3	18	0	64.97	12
1982	Subiaco (20)	1	20	0	73.36	4
1983	Perth (9)	3	18	0	76.93	12
1984	Perth (10)	5	16	0	79.01	20
1985	East Perth (5)	5	16	0	88.64	20
1986	Swan Districts (15)	5	16	0	83.02	20
1987	South Fremantle (12)	3	18	0	75.19	12
1988	Swan Districts (16)	4	16	1	75.85	18
1989	East Perth (6)	3	18	0	66.36	12
1990	West Perth (9)	6	15	0	70.23	24
1991	West Perth (10)	5	16	0	69.04	20
1992	West Perth (11)	7	14	0	80.96	28
1993	Perth (11)	6	15	0	73.00	24
1994	Perth (12)	5	16	0	75.40	20
1995	Swan Districts (17)	2	19	0	61.61	8
1996	Subiaco (21)	6	15	0	63.74	24
1997	Peel	1	19	0	39.19	4
1998	Peel (2)	1	19	0	53.87	4
1999	Peel (3)	0	20	0	46.61	0
2000	Perth (13)	1	17	0	63.31	4
2001	Swan Districts (18)	3	15	0	72.28	12
2002	Swan Districts (19)	1	17	0	61.92	4
2003	Peel (4)	1	19	0	40.93	4
2004	East Fremantle (2)	3	17	0	74.62	12
2005	Peel (5)	3	17	0	59.94	12
2006	East Fremantle (3)	4	16	0	74.82	16
2007	Perth (14)	3	17	0	77.27	12
2008	East Perth (7)	6	14	0	72.19	24
2009	Peel (6)	5	15	0	71.11	20
2010	Perth (15)	2	18	0	70.35	8
2011	Peel (7)	5	15	0	79.12	20
2012	Peel (8)	5	15	0	70.51	20
2013	Peel (9)	3	17	0	70.07	12
2014	Perth (16)	3	17	0	75.77	12
2015	Perth (17)	2	18	0	59.40	8
2016	Swan Districts (20)	2	18	0	58.30	8
2017	Perth (18)	3	17	0	63.84	12
2018	East Fremantle (4)	2	16	0	52.51	8
2019	Swan Districts (21)	4	14	0	68.93	16
2020	Peel (10)	0	8	0	48.17	0
2021	West Coast	4	14	0	65.21	16
2022	West Coast (2)	1	17	0	48.95	4
2023	West Coast (3)	0	17	1	39.17	2
2024	West Coast (4)	4	14	0	57.23	16
2025	West Coast (5)	2	16	0	64.87	8
2026	West Perth (12)	2	16	0	67.51	8

Table correct to the end of the 2026 season.

== Wooden spoons by club ==
Club	Total Wooden Spoons	Years of Wooden Spoon
**Subiaco**	21	1901, 1902, 1903, 1905, 1906, 1907, 1908, 1916, 1937, 1947, 1949, 1950, 1953, 1954, 1955, 1967, 1976, 1979, 1980, 1982, 1996
**Swan Districts**	21	1940, 1941, 1948, 1951, 1952, 1956, 1957, 1959, 1960, 1968, 1970, 1971, 1977, 1978, 1986, 1988, 1995, 2001, 2002, 2016, 2019
**Perth**^{[b]}	18	1900, 1912, 1921, 1922, 1923, 1935, 1942, 1981, 1983, 1984, 1993, 1994, 2000, 2007, 2010, 2014, 2015, 2017
**Claremont**^{[a]}	14	1926, 1927, 1928, 1931, 1932, 1933, 1934, 1945, 1946, 1958, 1962, 1963, 1973, 1975
**South Fremantle**	12	1904, 1920, 1925, 1936, 1943, 1944, 1961, 1965, 1966, 1969, 1972, 1987
**West Perth**	12	1895, 1918, 1919, 1930, 1938, 1939, 1964, 1974, 1990, 1991, 1992, 2026
**Peel**	10	1997, 1998, 1999, 2003, 2005, 2009, 2011, 2012, 2013, 2020
**East Perth**	7	1911, 1913, 1929, 1964, 1985, 1989, 2008
Rovers	6	1890, 1893, 1894, 1896, 1897, 1899
**West Coast (R)**	5	2021, 2022, 2023, 2024, 2025
**East Fremantle**	4	1898, 2004, 2006, 2018
Midland Junction	3	1909, 1910, 1917
West Australian	2	1887, 1888
East Perth (I)	2	1891, 1892
North Fremantle	2	1914, 1915
High School	1	1885
Unions/Fremantle (II)	1	1886
Metropolitan	1	1889
Fremantle (I)	0	N/A
Victorians	0	N/A
Imperials	0	N/A
Centrals	0	N/A

^{a} Claremont were known as Claremont-Cottesloe between 1926 - 1934.
^{b} Perth were known as Victoria Park between 1934 - 1935.

Bold indicates clubs currently playing in the WAFL.

Table correct to the end of the 2026 season.

== Longest wooden spoon droughts ==
Club	Seasons	Start	End
East Fremantle	106	1898	2004
Claremont	51	1975	-
Perth	39	1942	1981
South Fremantle	39	1987	-
East Perth	35	1929	1964
West Perth	34	1992	2026
Subiaco	30	1996	-
West Perth	26	1939	1965
West Perth	23	1895	1918
East Perth	21	1964	1985
Subiaco	21	1916	1937

Table correct to the end of the 2026 season.

== Active wooden spoon droughts ==
Club	Last Wooden Spoon	Years since
Claremont	1975	51
East Perth	2008	18
East Fremantle	2018	8
Peel	2020	6
Perth	2017	9
South Fremantle	1987	39
Subiaco	1996	30
Swan Districts	2019	7
West Coast (R)	2025	1
West Perth	2026	0

Table correct to the end of the 2026 season.

== Consecutive Wooden Spoons ==
Ten clubs have finished last in 3 or more consecutive seasons.

#	Club	Sequence of Seasons
5	West Coast (R)	2021 – 2025
4	Subiaco	1905 – 1908
4	Claremont-Cottesloe	1931 – 1934
3	Subiaco	1901 – 1903
3	Perth	1921 – 1923
3	Claremont-Cottesloe	1926 - 1928
3	Subiaco	1953 – 1955
3	West Perth	1990 – 1992
3	Peel	1997 – 1999
3	Peel	2011 – 2013

Table correct to the end of the 2026 season.

== WAFL Women's ==
This a list of wooden spoons obtained in the West Australian Women's Football League. The league was established in 2018 and commenced its first season in 2019.

Season	Wooden spoon	Wins	Losses	Draws	Percentage (%)	Points
2019	Peel	1	11	0	35.71	4
2020	South Fremantle	0	7	0	16.25	0
2021	South Fremantle (2)	0	15	0	27.36	0
2022	West Perth	0	14	0	9.97	0
2023	East Perth	0	14	0	12.97	0
2024	Peel (2)	1	13	0	23.73	4
2025	East Perth (2)	1	15	0	25.00	4
2026	Peel (3)	0	16	0	38.99	0

Table correct to the end of the 2026 season.
