= List of Old Boys of Christ Church Grammar School =

Old Boys of Christ Church Grammar School are former students of Christ Church Grammar School, an Anglican Church school in Claremont, a suburb of Perth, Western Australia.

The source of most of the information below about each Old Boy's years of attendance is the school's centenary history, published in 2010.

== Vice Regal ==
- Wayne Martin (1965–1969) – Lieutenant Governor of Western Australia

== Academia and science ==
=== Rhodes Scholars ===
- 1967: Peter Edwards (1950–1962) – consultant historian, author
- 1974: Rod Eddington (1963–1967) – CEO, Cathay Pacific, Ansett and British Airways, director, News Corporation

=== Others – academia and science ===
- Irwin Lewis (1953–1956) – first indigenous person to attend the University of Western Australia
- Andrew McGowan (1974–1978) – Dean and President of the Berkeley Divinity School at Yale, and McFaddin Professor of Anglican Studies at Yale Divinity School
- Richard Pestell (1969–1975) – Professor of Oncology and Medicine, Director, Kimmel Cancer Center, Thomas Jefferson University, Philadelphia, USA
- Ralph Simmonds (1959–1967) – Professor of Law, Murdoch University

== Business ==
- Rod Eddington (1963–1967) – CEO, Cathay Pacific, Ansett and British Airways; director, News Corporation; Chairman, Infrastructure Australia
- Andrew Forrest (1970–1977) – Chairman and CEO, Fortescue; philanthropist (also attended Hale School)
- David Hohnen (1963–1966) – founder, Cape Mentelle winery (winner, Jimmy Watson Memorial Trophy, 1983 and 1984) and Cloudy Bay Vineyards
- Peter Holmes à Court (1974–1979) – CEO, Back Row Productions and Australian Agricultural Company
- Michael Wright (1952–1956) – owner, Voyager Estate; philanthropist

== Law ==
=== Chief Justice ===
- Wayne Martin (1965–1969) – Chief Justice of Western Australia

=== Others – law ===
- Ralph Simmonds (1959–1967) – Justice of the Supreme Court of Western Australia

== Media, entertainment, culture and the arts ==
- Piers Akerman (1960–1964) – journalist, editor (The Advertiser, Adelaide, Herald Sun, Melbourne), columnist (The Daily Telegraph, Sydney) (also attended Guildford Grammar School)
- Nick Allbrook (2000–2004) – Band member of Tame Impala, frontman of Pond
- Hal Colebatch (1954–1962) – author, poet, lecturer, journalist, editor, and lawyer
- Jon Doust (1961–1965) – comedian, author
- Peter Holland (1960–1961) – radio and television presenter (ABC)
- Andrew Jaspan (1964–1967) – journalist, Editor-in-Chief of The Age, Melbourne
- Tony Jones (–1962), Australian sculptor Eliza)
- Irwin Lewis (1953–1956) – indigenous Australian artist
- David McComb (1967–1978) – singer, songwriter, The Triffids
- Mark McEntee (1963–1970) – guitarist, Divinyls
- Tim Minchin (1982–1992) – musician, comedian, composer
- John Oldham (ca 1918) – landscape architect (also attended Guildford Grammar School)
- Nelson Woss (1982–1986) – film producer (Heartland Film Festival Grand Prize Winner)

== Politics and public service ==
=== Cabinet ministers ===
- Ken Baston (1960–1967) – Minister for Agriculture and Food and Minister for Fisheries, Barnett Ministry, Western Australia
- Senator Ian Campbell (1976) – Minister in various portfolios, Second, Third and Fourth Howard Ministries, Australia (also attended Brisbane Grammar School)
- Murray Criddle (1953–1961) – Minister for Transport in the Court-Cowan Ministry, Western Australia
- Peter Foss (1958–1963) – Minister in various portfolios in the Court-Cowan Ministry, Western Australia
- Doug Shave (1963–1964) – Minister in various portfolios in the Court-Cowan Ministry, Western Australia

=== Other Members of Parliament ===
- Ric Charlesworth (1965–1969) – Member of the Australian House of Representatives for the Division of Perth
- Senator Alan Eggleston (1953–1959) – Senator for Western Australia
- Mal Washer (1961) – Member of the Australian House of Representatives for the Division of Moore

=== Others – politics and public service ===
- Sir William Heseltine GCB GCVO AC QSO PC (1943–1946) – Private Secretary to Queen Elizabeth II, 1986–1990
- Bruce Haigh (1956–1962) – diplomat, political analyst

== Sport ==
=== Australian rules football ===
- John Annear (1971–1976) – AFL football player (Collingwood, Richmond, West Coast Eagles)
- Andrew Browne (1997–2001) – AFL football player (Fremantle)
- Jaxon Crabb (1995–1996) – AFL football player (West Coast Eagles, Port Adelaide), Sandover Medallist, 2005
- Tony Evans (1982–1986) – AFL football player (West Coast Eagles) (member, West Coast Eagles premiership teams, 1992 and 1994)
- Chris Lewis (1984–1986) – AFL football player (West Coast Eagles) (member, West Coast Eagles premiership teams, 1992 and 1994)
- Luke McPharlin (1995–1999) – AFL football player (Hawthorn and Fremantle)
- Eric Mackenzie (2001–2005) – AFL football player (West Coast Eagles)
- Tom Swift (1996–2007) – AFL football player (West Coast Eagles)
- Ryan Turnbull (1981–1988) – AFL football player (West Coast Eagles), Sandover Medallist, 2001
- Tim English (2015) – AFL Football player, Western Bulldogs

=== Basketball ===
- Matt Burston (1995–1999) – NBL player (Perth Wildcats, South Dragons, Adelaide 36ers, Melbourne Tigers, Cairns Taipans)
- Ben Purser (2003–2007) – NBL player (Perth Wildcats)

=== Cricket ===
- Jim Allenby (1995–1999) – state and county cricketer (Durham Cricket Board, Leicestershire, Western Australia, Glamorgan)
- Ric Charlesworth (1965–1969) – state cricketer (Western Australia (member of Sheffield Shield winning team, 1972–73, 1976–77, 1977–78))
- Stuart MacGill (1981–1988) – international cricketer (Australia)
- Daniel Marsh (1985–1990) – state and county cricketer (South Australia, Tasmania (captain 2002–03 to 2008–09, including of Sheffield Shield winning team, 2006–07), Leicestershire)
- Ashton Turner (2010) – state cricketer (Western Australia, Perth Scorchers)
- Stephen Eskinazi (2011) – county cricketer (Middlesex County Cricket Club)

=== Golf ===
- Roger Mackay (1963–1973) – professional golfer; winner, Australian PGA Championship, 1987; WA Sportsman of the Year, 1991

=== Field hockey ===
- Ric Charlesworth (1965–1969) – international player (Australia) and coach (Hockeyroos and Kookaburras); WA Sportsman of the Year, 1976, 1979, 1986 and 1987
- Adam Froese – international player (Canada)
- Scott Webster (1989–1993) – international player, including at the World Hockey Cup, 2002 (silver medallist)

=== Motor sport ===
- Mike Thackwell (1972–1976) – racing driver; competed in F1, F2 (winner, European championship, 1984), F3000, F3, sports cars (winner, 1000km Nürburgring, 1986), CART

=== Olympics ===
- Jim Battersby (1971–1976) – rowing (men's eight), Los Angeles 1984 (bronze medallist)
- Ric Charlesworth (1965–1969) – hockey, Munich 1972, Montreal 1976 (silver medallist), Los Angeles 1984 (captain), Seoul 1988, Atlanta 1996 (Hockeyroos coach), Sydney 2000 (Hockeyroos coach), London 2012 (Kookaburras coach)
- Tommaso D'Orsogna (2003–2007) – swimming, London 2012 (bronze medallist)
- George Ford (2010) – water polo, Rio de Janeiro 2016
- Adam Froese (2008) – hockey (Canada), Rio de Janeiro 2016
- Bill Kirby (1990–1992) – swimming, Sydney 2000 (gold medallist)
- Miguel Porteous – freestyle skiing (New Zealand), Pyeongchang 2018
- Nico Porteous – freestyle skiing (New Zealand), Pyeongchang 2018 (bronze medallist)
- Todd Skipworth (1998–2002) – rowing (lightweight coxless four), London 2016, Rio de Janeiro 2016
- Jonathan van Hazel (1988–1995) – swimming, Athens 2004
- Robin Bell (1986–1994) – Canoe/Kayak/Slalom, Sydney 2000, Athens 2004, Beijing 2008 Bronze

=== Paralympics ===
- Joshua Hofer OAM (1987–1991) – swimming, Madrid Paralympics 1992 (gold medallist)

=== Rugby league ===
- Peter Holmes à Court (1974–1979) – co-owner and CEO of South Sydney Rabbitohs

=== Tennis ===
- Darren Patten (1986–1987) – 1990 Australian Open, WA Challenge Cup Representative, Tennis Australia BP Achievers Squad, Western Australian Open Singles Winner.
- David Culley (1982–1987) – WA Challenge Cup Representative, 10 x WA State league Winner, Western Australian Open Singles Winner.
- Jaymon Crabb (1994–1995) – 1997, 2002, 2003 Australian Open, Australian Davis Cup Assistant Coach. ATP #181 Singles.
- Paul Kilderry (1985–1987) – ATP #138 Singles, ATP # Doubles 64, Australian Open, Wimbledon, US Open, French Open.

=== Water polo ===
- George Ford (2010) – international player (Australia)
- Nick O'Halloran (2000–2004) – international player (Australia), including at the FINA Water Polo World League, 2007 (bronze medallist)

=== Yachting ===
- Peter Gilmour (1968–1977) – international yachtsman (including in the America's Cup), WA Sportsman of the Year, 1987
- Jon Sanders AO OBE (1952–1955) – yachtsman, circumnavigator

== See also ==
- List of schools in Western Australia
- List of boarding schools
- Public Schools Association
