= Emily Perry =

Emily Perry may refer to:

- Emily Perry (Australian actress) (born 1981), Australian soap opera actor
- Emily Perry (English actress) (1907–2008), English actress and dancer
- Emily Austin Perry (1795–1851), early settler of Texas and sole heir to Stephen F. Austin
- Emily Perry (politician), Kansas Democrat
