= Emily Perry (politician) =

American politician (born 1985)

Member of the Kansas House of Representatives from the 24th district
- In office January 14, 2013 – January 12, 2015
- Preceded by: Mike Slattery
- Succeeded by: Jarrod Ousley

Personal details
- Born: October 18, 1985 (age 40) Merriam, Kansas, U.S.
- Party: Democratic
- Education: Miami University; University of Kansas
- Occupation: Attorney

Emily Perry (October 18, 1985) is a Democratic former member of the Kansas House of Representatives, representing the 24th district. Perry opposed a Kansas law passed in 2013 that attempted to nullify federal gun laws, on the grounds that it was unconstitutional. Perry did not seek re-election in 2014.

2013–2014 Kansas House of Representatives Committee assignments:

- Ranking Minority Member of Transportation
- Federal and State Affairs
- Judiciary

Kansas House of Representatives
| Preceded by Mike Slattery | Kansas House of Representatives; Representative for the 24th district 2013–2014 | Succeeded by Jarrod Ousley |
| Preceded by Vincent Wetta | Kansas House of Representatives; Ranking Minority Member of the Transportation Committee; 2013–2014 | Succeeded by Adam Lusker |
