= Arthur Lodge =

Australian cricketer and baseball player

Personal information
- Full name: Arthur Oliver Lodge
- Born: 7 April 1933; Guildford, Western Australia
- Died: 9 October 2022 (aged 89); Perth, Western Australia
- Batting: Left-handed

Domestic team information
- Years: Team
- 1958/59–1961/62: Western Australia cricket team
- Source: Cricinfo, 3 November 2017

Arthur Lodge (7 April 1933 – 9 October 2022) was an Australian cricketer and baseball player. He played fifteen first-class matches for Western Australia during 1958/59 to 1961/62. His 616 first-class runs came at an average of 26.78 and included four half centuries, with a highest score of 85.

In 1954 (aged 21), Lodge started playing baseball. A year later he was selected to play in the Claxton Shield in Sydney with the Western Australian state team.

Lodge attended Hale School from 1942 to 1952. He died in Perth on 9 October 2022.
