= Craig Oval =

Cricket ground in Wembley Downs, Perth, Western Australia

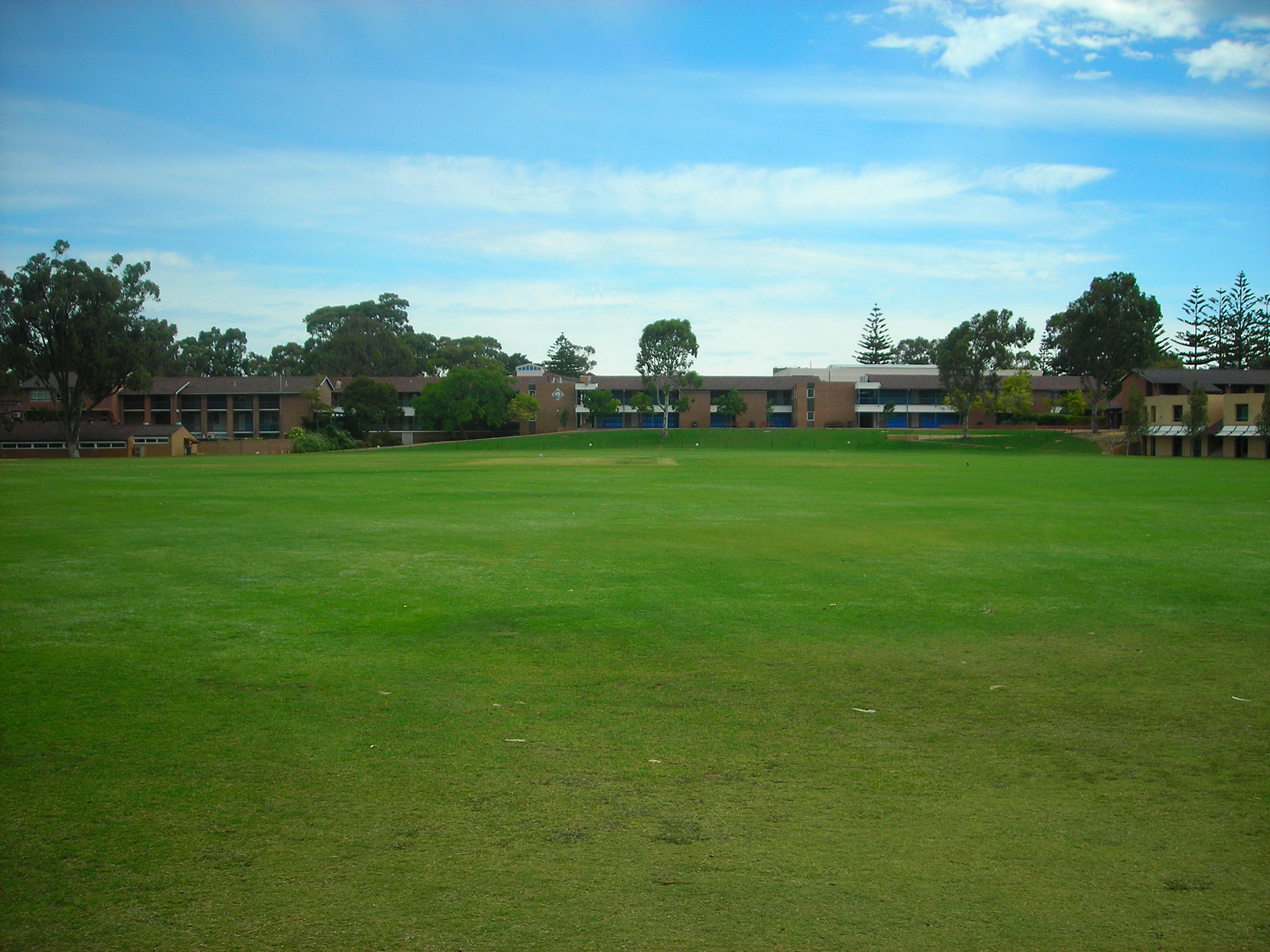
- Football and cricket ground

Ground information
- Location: Wembley Downs, Perth
- Coordinates: 31.9109°S 115.7809°E
- Home club: Hale School
- Last used: 22 December 2006

International information
- Only Test: 15 January 1977: Australia v India
- As of 12 January 2017; Source: cricketarchive

The Craig Oval is a cricket ground in Wembley Downs, a suburb of Perth, Western Australia. It is owned by, and part of, Hale School. It hosted the first Women's Test match between Australia and India.
