= Defence Abuse Response Taskforce =

The Defence Abuse Response Taskforce (DART) was an Australian Government organisation established by the Gillard Australian Labor Party Government under Minister for Defence Stephen Smith to help people who suffered physical or sexual abuse, harassment or bullying in the Australian Defence Force before 11 April 2011.

The Taskforce worked from 26 November 2012 until 30 June 2016. It considered 2,439 complaints and found 1,751 of these to be within its scope and plausible.

The Taskforce was headed by Len Roberts-Smith, assisted by Robert Cornall, Susan Halliday and Rudi Lammers, with Robyn Kruk acting as Reparation Payments Assessor.
