= Malachi O'Brien =

Irish Gaelic footballer (1867–1953)

Personal information
- Native name: Maoileachlainn Ó Briain (Irish)
- Nickname: The little wonder
- Born: 12 June 1867 Ballinvreena, County Limerick, Ireland
- Died: 2 August 1953 (aged 86) Croom, County Limerick, Ireland
- Occupation: Labourer

Sport
- Sport: Gaelic football
Club
- Years: Club
- Commercials
Club titles
- Limerick titles: 3
Inter-county
- Years: County
- 1887-1889: Limerick
Inter-county titles
- All-Irelands: 1

Malachi O'Brien (12 June 1867 – 2 August 1953) was an Irish Gaelic footballer. His championship career with the Limerick senior team lasted three seasons from 1887 until 1889.

Raised in Ballinvreena, County Limerick, O'Brien was born to John and Catherine O'Brien (née Fogarty). After leaving school at the age of fourteen he found employment with Cannock's department store in Limerick. O'Brien later spent a short time with Clerys in Dublin before emigrating to the United States, where he remained until 1929, before returning to Ballinvreena.

After moving to Limerick, O'Brien first played competitive Gaelic football with the Commercials club, winning three successive county senior championship medals between 1887 and 1889.

O'Brien made his inter-county debut during the 1887 championship when the Commercials club represented Limerick in the inaugural championship. He won his sole All-Ireland medal that year as Limerick defeated Louth in the final.

== Honours ==
Commercials

- Limerick Senior Football Championship (3): 1887, 1888, 1889

Limerick

- All-Ireland Senior Football Championship (1): 1887
