= Judge Advocate General (Australia) =

Position in the Australian Defence Force

The Judge Advocate General (JAG) of the Australian Defence Force (ADF) is an office established under the Defence Force Discipline Act (1982). This position is held by a judge or former judge of a federal court or a state supreme court. The appointment of the JAG is made by the Governor-General-in-Council. The JAG has the authority to establish procedural rules for tribunals operating within the Navy, Army, and Air Force. They also conduct the final legal review of proceedings within the ADF and play a role in the appointment of judge advocates, Defence Force magistrates, presidents, and members of courts martial, as well as legal officers for various purposes. Additionally, the JAG is responsible for reporting on the operation of laws concerning the discipline of the ADF.

The current Judge Advocate General is Major General the Hon. Justice Paul Smith AM.

The JAG is assisted by three deputy judge advocates general (DJAG), one for each service:

- DJAG – Navy
- DJAG – Army
- DJAG – Air Force

The current Deputy Judge Advocates General are:

- Navy: Commodore Her Honour Judge Catherine Traill RAN
- Army: Vacant
- Air Force: Air Commodore The Hon. Justice Melissa Perry

== List of Judge Advocates General ==
The following individuals have been appointed as Judge Advocate General of the Australian Defence Force:

Order	Name	Organisation	Term start	Term end	Notes
1	MAJGEN The Hon. Robert Mohr RFD ED	Supreme Court of South Australia	1985	30 July 1987	
2	AVM The Hon. Alastair Nicholson AO RFD	Chief Justice of the Family Court of Australia	February 1988	1992	
3	RADM The Hon. Alwynne Rowlands AO RFD RANR	Family Court of Australia	1992	1996	
4	MAJGEN The Hon. Kevin Duggan AM RFD	Supreme Court of South Australia	1996	2001	
5	MAJGEN The Hon. Len Roberts-Smith RFD	Supreme Court of Western Australia	June 2002	2007	
6	MAJGEN The Hon. Richard Tracey AM RFD	Federal Court of Australia	26 September 2007	29 July 2014	
7	RADM The Hon. Michael Slattery AM RAN	Supreme Court of New South Wales	30 July 2014	2021	
8	RADM The Hon. Jack Rush RFD KC RAN	Supreme Court of Victoria	2021	2026	
9	MAJGEN The Hon. Paul Smith AM	Supreme Court of Queensland	13 August 2026	Incumbent	

== See also ==
- Judge Advocate General
- Military Court of Australia
