= William Gunning (Gaelic footballer) =

Irish Gaelic footballer

Personal information
- Native name: Liam Ó Conaing (Irish)
- Born: 1864 Limerick, Ireland
- Died: 16 November 1895 (aged 30) Limerick, Ireland
- Occupation: Grocer

Sport
- Sport: Gaelic football
Club
- Years: Club
- Commercials
Club titles
- Limerick titles: 3
Inter-county
- Years: County
- 1887-1889: Limerick
Inter-county titles
- All-Irelands: 1

William Gunning (1864 - 16 November 1895) was an Irish Gaelic footballer. His championship career with the Limerick senior team lasted three seasons from 1887 until 1889.

Gunning first played competitive Gaelic football with the Commercials club, winning three successive county senior championship medals between 1887 and 1889.

Gunning made his inter-county debut during the 1887 championship when the Commercials club represented Limerick in the inaugural championship. He won his sole All-Ireland medal that year as Limerick defeated Louth in the final.

Gunning died from typhoid fever on 16 November 1895.

== Honours ==
Commercials

- Limerick Senior Football Championship (3): 1887, 1888, 1889

Limerick

- All-Ireland Senior Football Championship (1): 1887
