= Donna Yoh =

American politician (1959–2011)

Member of the Kansas House of Representatives from the 2nd district
- In office January 1995 – January 1997
- Preceded by: Robert Grant
- Succeeded by: Robert Grant

Personal details
- Born: June 2, 1959
- Died: August 9, 2011 (aged 52)
- Party: Republican
- Occupation: Politician

Donna Yoh (June 22, 1959 – August 9, 2011) was an American politician who served one term in the Kansas House of Representatives as the representative from the 2nd district. A Republican, she was elected to the Kansas Legislature in 1994 and served until her defeat by Democrat Robert Grant in the 1996 election.

Yoh was a graduate of Parsons High School in Parsons, Kansas, and received a PhD from the University of Virginia. She served in the U.S. Army and worked as a life coach.

Kansas House of Representatives
Preceded by Robert Grant	Kansas House of Representatives; Representative from the 2nd district 1995–1997	Succeeded by Robert Grant
