= Robert Grant (Kansas politician) =

American politician

Member of the Kansas House of Representatives from the 2nd district
- In office 1997 – December 10, 2013
- Preceded by: Donna Yoh
- Succeeded by: Adam Lusker
- In office 1992–1995
- Preceded by: Sam Roper
- Succeeded by: Donna Yoh

Personal details
- Born: November 28, 1948 Clovis, New Mexico
- Died: December 9, 2015 (aged 67) Joplin, Missouri
- Party: Democratic Party
- Education: Labette Community College

Robert P. Grant (November 28, 1948 – December 9, 2015) was a Democratic member of the Kansas House of Representatives, representing the 2nd district. He served his first term from 1991 to 1994 and served from 1997 to 2013.

Prior to becoming a representative, Grant served as mayor of Cherokee for 16 years. Long active in the community, he was involved with the American Legion, West Mineral Eagles and Pittsburg Elks Lodge #412 and with Big Brothers/Big Sisters and the Cherokee Gun Club.

Grant was married to his wife Lynn for 39 years. They have a daughter and two grandchildren.

He announced he would be retiring effective December 10, 2013. Grant died on December 9, 2015, at the age of 67 after a short illness.

== Committee membership ==
- Financial Institutions (Ranking Member)
- Insurance (Ranking Member)
- Transportation
- Agriculture and Natural Resources
- Joint Committee on State Building Construction (Chair)

== Major donors ==
The top five donors to Grant's 2008 campaign came mostly from professional associations:

- 1. Midwest Minerals $1,000
- 2. Kansas National Education Assoc. $1,000
- 3. Kansans for Lifesaving Cures $1,000
- 4. Kansas Optometric Assoc. $800
- 5. Kansas Bankers Assoc. $800

Kansas House of Representatives
| Preceded by Sam Roper | Kansas House of Representatives; Representative from the 2nd district 1992–1995 | Succeeded by Donna Yoh |
| Preceded by Donna Yoh | Kansas House of Representatives; Representative from the 2nd district 1997–2013 | Succeeded by Adam Lusker |
