= Sam Roberts-Smith =

Australian operatic baritone (born 1985)

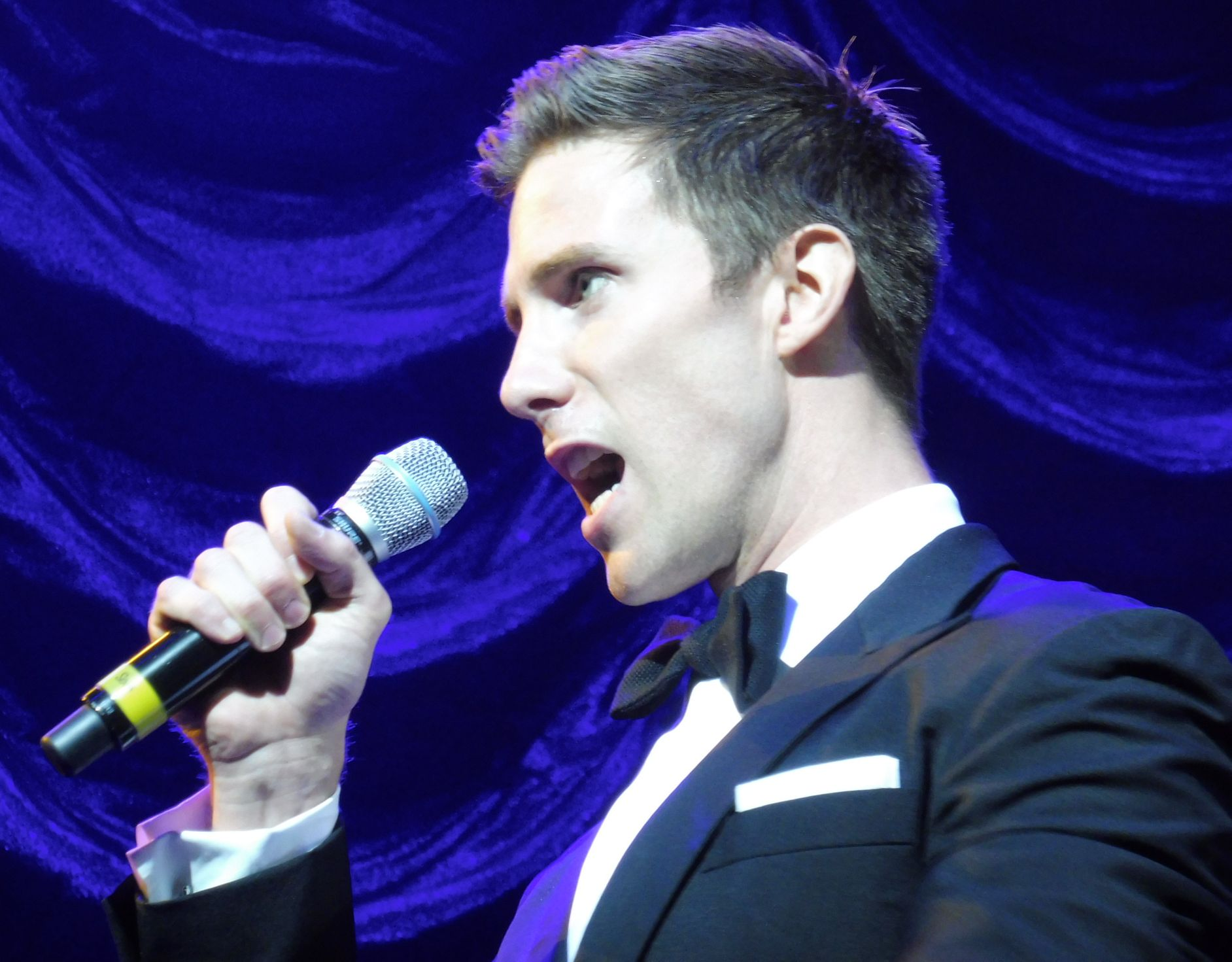
- Roberts-Smith in 2018
- Born: 30 December 1985 (age 40); Perth, Western Australia
- Education: Hale School; Western Australian Academy of Performing Arts; Edith Cowan University
- Occupation: Operatic baritone
- Parent(s): Sue and Len Roberts-Smith
- Relatives: Ben Roberts-Smith (brother)

Samuel Roberts-Smith (born 30 December 1985) is an Australian operatic baritone who has performed with the Deutsche Oper Berlin, Opera Australia, West Australian Opera, the Ten Tenors, Sydney Philharmonia, Queensland Symphony Orchestra, Orchestra Victoria, West Australian Symphony Orchestra and various other opera companies in Australia and overseas.

== Early life and education ==
Roberts-Smith was born in Perth, Western Australia, to Sue and Len Roberts-Smith. He attended Hale School, as did his older brother, Ben Roberts-Smith. He graduated from the Western Australian Academy of Performing Arts in 2008 where he sang in an alternating cast the role of John Proctor in the Australian premiere of Robert Ward's opera The Crucible. He has a master's degree in Human Resource Management from Edith Cowan University.

== Career ==
Roberts-Smith joined Opera Australia in 2009 where he made his principal debut as Moralès in Carmen in 2011. That same year Roberts-Smith joined the Opera Australia Young Artist Program and subsequently the principal artist ensemble. He performed Opera Australia repertoire including Macbeth, The Mikado, A Midsummer Nights Dream, La bohème, Lakmé, Eugene Onegin, Tosca, Manon, La traviata, Carmen, Der Rosenkavalier, La sonnambula, Les pêcheurs de perles, Madama Butterfly, La fanciulla del West, Il trovatore, The Magic Flute, Bliss, Rigoletto, and Don Giovanni.

Roberts-Smith joined The Ten Tenors from 2015 to 2017, and toured Australia, the US and Argentina with them.

Recorded DVD performances include Remendado in Carmen for Opera Australia in their 2013 Handa Opera on Sydney Harbour by ABC Classics, and Der Rosenkavalier recorded live at the Sydney Opera House.

In August 2014, he was invited to sing the national anthem at the National Memorial Service for the victims of Malaysia Airlines Flight 17, held at Melbourne's St Patrick's Cathedral. Prime Minister Tony Abbott and Governor-General Sir Peter Cosgrove attended the service joined by premiers and chief ministers, the public, and families of the victims.

Later that year, he toured China with the Australian International Opera Company as Count Almaviva in Mozart's The Marriage of Figaro. On the concert stage, he sang with the Queensland Symphony Orchestra in Messiah.

Roberts-Smith appeared opposite Emma Matthews in 2016 as Zurga in the West Australian Opera production of Bizet's Les pêcheurs de perles.

For Deutsche Oper Berlin he has appeared in over a dozen productions, including La traviata opposite Leo Nucci in August 2017, Il Barbiere di Siviglia in October 2017, Lady Macbeth of Mtsensk in April 2018, Rigoletto in May 2018 opposite Simon Keenlyside, Il viaggio a Reims in June 2018, and Andrea Chénier in November 2018.

In 2019, Roberts-Smith appeared in La traviata for West Australian Opera, understudied the role of Judge Turpin and performed in the TEG Life Like Company's Sweeney Todd starring Anthony Warlow and Gina Riley, performed Brahms' Requiem with the Sydney Philharmonia Choirs, the title role in The Marriage of Figaro for the Australian International Productions tour of China, and starred in Barry Conyngham's Australian opera Fly.

In October that year, Roberts-Smith performed the title character in the Australian premiere of The Enchanted Pig in collaboration with internationally renowned director Gale Edwards and Academy Award winning costume designer Tim Chappel. Performances took place in the Yarra Valley in regional Victoria as part of Australia's only international opera festival.

2020 saw Roberts-Smith perform in the historic timber town of Jarrahdale at ‘Opera at the Mill’, a joint venture between West Australian Opera and the Shire of Serpentine. In March, Roberts-Smith travelled to São Paulo, Brazil, to again perform with The Ten Tenors. Due to the global spread of COVID-19, the tour was cancelled before performances took place. In October 2020, as West Australian social distancing restrictions eased, Roberts-Smith performed the role of Guglielmo in Mozart's Così fan tutte for West Australian Opera, the first major opera company to return to live performance with a fully staged production in Australia.

== Accolades ==
He has won numerous Australian and international awards, including the Joan Sutherland Vocal Scholarship, first place in the 2009 Australian Singing Competition, Symphony Australia Young Vocalist Award, Best Performance Award at the 2014 Paris Opera Awards, and the inaugural Deutsche Oper Berlin Award in 2016. In 2015 the West Australian Opera selected Roberts-Smith as a Mentored Artist in 2015. In 2021, he made the dean's list at Edith Cowan University School of Business and Law.
