= Paul Royle =

Australian airman

- Born: Paul Gordon Royle; 17 January 1914; Perth, Western Australia
- Died: 23 August 2015 (aged 101); Perth, Western Australia
- Military career
- Allegiance: United Kingdom
- Branch: Royal Air Force
- Service years: 1938–45
- Rank: Flight Lieutenant
- Unit: No. 53 Squadron RAF

Flight Lieutenant Paul Gordon Royle (17 January 1914 – 23 August 2015) was an Australian Royal Air Force pilot who was one of the last two survivors of the 76 men who were able to escape from the Stalag Luft III German prisoner-of-war camp in World War II in what became known as The Great Escape.

== Early life ==
Royle was born in Perth, Western Australia and he attended Hale School and then worked in mining in Kalgoorlie. A Royal Air Force recruiting team visited Australia and he was selected for a short term commission and pilot training. He flew solo in a de Havilland Tiger Moth and then learnt to fly the Avro Anson twin engine trainer and the Bristol Blenheim aircraft at No.2 School of Army Cooperation at Andover, Hampshire. He was then posted to No. 53 Squadron RAF in Northern France as a pilot officer.

== Captivity ==
On 17 May 1940, his aircraft crash landed after being attacked by Messerschmitt Bf 109 fighters whilst on a reconnaissance mission and he was taken prisoner by advancing German troops. After a year in Stalag Luft I he was transferred to Stalag Luft III Sagan, Germany (now Żagań, Poland) where he was one of the prisoners nicknamed "the penguins" who helped to dispose of sand from tunneling in their trousers and he started a tunnel under block 68.

== The Great Escape ==
On the night of 24 March 1944, he was number 57 in the queue of war prisoners waiting to escape and teamed up with Flight Lieutenant Edgar Humphreys who was the next in line. After being pulled through the narrow tunnel on a trolley and climbing the exit ladder, Royle and Humphreys ran for the cover of pine trees and then set off in the direction of Switzerland. They evaded capture for two nights and crossed the Berlin to Breslau autobahn before they were arrested by home guard upon entering a village. The two men were interrogated by the Gestapo in Görlitz, Royle was then returned to solitary confinement in Stalag Luft III but Humphreys was one of the 50 escapers who were victims of the Stalag Luft III murders, having been selected for execution by SS-Gruppenführer Arthur Nebe on the orders of Adolf Hitler.

== Later life ==
In January 1945 with Soviet forces only 16 miles away the camp was evacuated and the prisoners including Royle were marched west to Marlag und Milag Nord prisoner-of-war camp. He was finally liberated by British troops on 2 May 1945 and was flown to Britain where he was discharged from the RAF. He then attended the Royal School of Mines and worked in the mining and engineering industries upon his return to Australia. He married twice and celebrated his 100th birthday in January 2014.

Royle died, aged 101, on 23 August 2015, leaving Dick Churchill as the only remaining survivor of the 1944 escape from Stalag Luft III. Churchill himself died four years later.
