= Ralph Simmonds =

Australian law professor and judge

The Hon. Justice Ralph Lloyd Simmonds was born in Sydney, NSW in May 1950, and educated at Nedlands Primary School and Christ Church Grammar School in Perth, Western Australia. He obtained a Bachelor of Laws with Honours from the University of Western Australia in 1972 and a Master of Laws from the University of Toronto, Ontario, Canada, in 1976.

He was admitted to practice in Western Australia in 1974, after articling at Muir Williams Nicholson & Co (now Freehills). He was a law lecturer at the University of Windsor, Ontario, together with his Quebec-native wife, a multilingual academic who obtained her PhD from the University of Toronto, and then McGill University, Montreal, Quebec, 1980–89. Canada's province of Quebec has French rather than English law other than for the federal Criminal Code, but McGill's faculty of law provides legal education to students in both French and English law.

Simmonds was Foundation Dean (1992–95, 1997–2003) and Foundation Professor of Law at Murdoch University in Perth. He has also served on the Law Reform Commission of Western Australia and as National Convenor of the Committee of Australian Law Deans (1994–95). He was appointed to the Supreme Court of Western Australia in February 2004.
