= Adam Lusker =

American politician

Member of the Kansas House of Representatives from the 2nd district
- In office 2014 – January 14, 2019
- Preceded by: Robert Grant
- Succeeded by: Ken Collins

Personal details
- Born: 1971 or 1972
- Party: Democratic
- Spouse: Lisa Lusker

Adam John Lusker Sr. is an American politician who served in the Kansas House of Representatives as a Democrat from the 2nd district from 2014 to 2019.

Lusker was appointed to fill the remaining year of Robert Grant's term in the House, when Grant resigned in December 2013. Lusker was elected in his own right in 2014; he faced no opposition in either the primary or general elections. He was re-elected in 2016, similarly without opposition, but in 2018 he was narrowly defeated in the general election by Republican Ken Collins, losing with 49.6% of the vote.
