= Melvin Poh =

Malaysian entrepreneur, barrister and investor

Melvin Poh FRSA
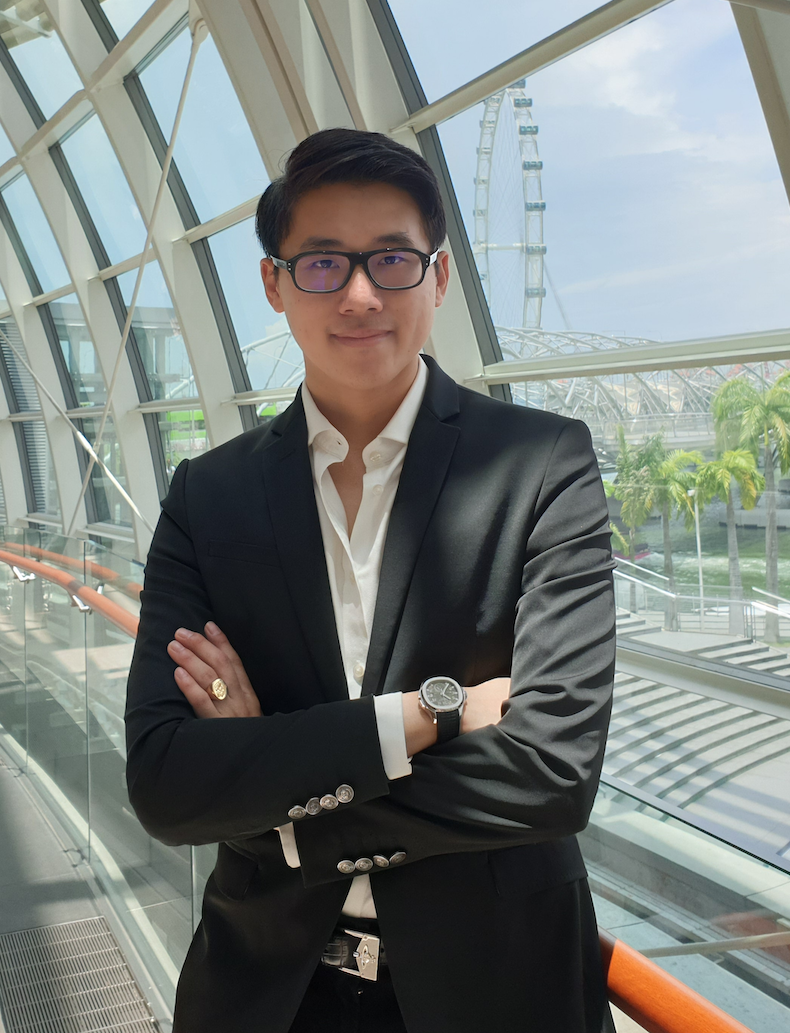
- Born: 1 July 1991 (age 35); Malaysia
- Education: Harvard University; University Of Cambridge; Imperial College London
- Occupations: Entrepreneur, investor & barrister
- Known for: Publishing, access to knowledge movement, philosophy

Melvin Poh FRSA (born 1 July 1991) is a Malaysian entrepreneur, barrister, investor, public intellectual and author. He is known for his work in the democratization of knowledge and public philosophy. He has worked to widen access to knowledge in Asia through crowdsourced and open publishing and is a proponent of the Access to Knowledge movement in Southeast Asia.

== Early life and education ==
Poh was born in Malaysia but had emigrated and spent most of his years living in New Zealand, Australia, United States and United Kingdom. He attended Hale School and later studied at Harvard University, Imperial College London and University of Cambridge. Poh subsequently became a barrister in the United Kingdom and was admitted as a member of The Honourable Society of Lincoln's Inn.

== Career ==
=== The Asian Entrepreneur ===
In 2013, Poh founded The Asian Entrepreneur with another student at Harvard. The Asian Entrepreneur began in the United States as a print publication documenting business knowledge in Asia. The print publication was later developed by Poh into a digital crowdpublishing platform that allowed users to participate in the production of content and the editorial process through an open collaboration model. The Asian Entrepreneur then became an open access platform for accessing, exchanging and publishing business knowledge across Asia. The organization had worked with Southeast Asian governments on various startup initiatives for open access knowledge and education. In 2021 after raising funds, The Asian Entrepreneur was further expanded and officially rebranded to Empirics Asia.

=== Empirics Press ===
In January 2021, Poh and his team raised US$8 million for The Asian Entrepreneur to expand its publishing scope further and renamed the company Empirics Asia. Empirics Asia was launched as an open access knowledge platform modeled on empiricism that incorporated social journalism, open publishing and crowdsourcing from Asia to publish direct insights on social scientific fields. Through the expanded publishing coverage, Empirics Asia worked with authors and experts to crowdsource knowledge and publish topics ranging from technology, psychology, philosophy, sociology, business, literature, economics, science and arts. Without operating a conventional paywall, content sponsorship and advertising, the platform aims to contribute to the democratization of knowledge. The organization also established a publishing and distribution operation for sourcing original titles and books from authors in Asia. It launched Empirics Podcast, an open access knowledge podcast produced and hosted by a machine learning artificial intelligence that was developed to study knowledge trends. As of September 2021, the organization has crowdsourced and published 1 million open access knowledge content in the social sciences from its network of writers and volunteers. In 2023, Empirics Asia released Librius, an artificial intelligence developed by the company to make learning from books more accessible to the public. In 2025, the organization launched Empirics Press, a combined knowledge platform and publishing body that hosts its open access research and publishes original work across print, film and digital media.

=== Public Philosophy ===
Poh has written and spoken widely on philosophy and access to knowledge. In 2018, he addressed The Harvard Project for Asian and International Relations on collective knowledge. He has given talks at several TEDx events on topics including knowledge creation through digital media, comparative philosophy, the democratization of knowledge and existentialism in the digital age. He has also officially served on the panel of Securities Commission Malaysia's Securities Industry Development Corporation, where he has advocated for the need for open access knowledge. During the British Council's 75th Year Anniversary symposium, Poh delivered a keynote addressing the knowledge gap facing youth today. Poh was invited by Malaysia's Ministry Of International Trade And Investment to share his views on empowering youth through intellectual discourse at the ASEAN Business Forum hosted in Malaysia in 2024. Poh founded The Philosophy Club, a social network designed to foster collective introspection and philosophical dialogue. In 2025, he published Disconnected, a philosophical study of modern life in a hyperconnected world, addressing erosion of attention, the commodification of identity, and the existential impact of digital media on contemporary thought. His work has also extended to the design of tools intended to bring philosophical ideas into daily life, among them a mechanical watch that miniaturizes an armillary sphere.

=== Investments ===
Poh has been an active private equity investor. He co-founded an investment company that specialized in sourcing private equity for collegiate entrepreneurs and startup companies from Australia, United Kingdom and United States. In 2018, Poh became the second largest shareholder of De Clout, a SGX publicly listed company in Singapore by acquiring a 11.8% personal stake in the company. He later joined other investors in the development of several real estate in Singapore and co-founded a property development firm specializing in Singaporean real estate development. In 2021, it was revealed that Poh had an invested stake in a textile manufacturing plant based in Malaysia that specialized in interior building materials. Poh was reported to have made acquisitions of several significant cultural works in China in 2024. He is a co-founder of a Singaporean investment firm that engages in private equity investments in Southeast Asia.

== Recognition ==
In 2019, Poh was among the 30 entrepreneurs admitted on the Forbes 30 Under 30 list, for fostering education through crowdsourcing knowledge in Asia. He was listed on Prestige 40 Under 40 for contributing to open access knowledge in the region through digital crowdpublishing and was named among 30 honourees of industry leaders on Tatler's Generation.T Leaders Of Tomorrow for creating an open access knowledge hub in Asia and making contributions to regional education. In 2022, Poh was one of the 4 Malaysians whose work was recognized by British High Commission and HE Charles Hay; he was the recipient of the Business & Innovation Award from the British Council for his work in improving accessibility to knowledge in Asia. Poh was made Fellow of the Royal Society Of Arts (FRSA) of the United Kingdom in recognition for his work. In 2025, he was recognized by Wiki Impact for promoting public philosophy and making social-scientific knowledge more accessible, particularly among younger audiences.
