= Ryan Hodson =

Australian rugby union player

- Full name: Ryan Hodson
- Born: 10 October 1989 (age 37)
- Height: 1.79 m (5 ft 10 in)
- Weight: 99 kg (15 st 8 lb; 218 lb)
- School: Hale School
- University: University of Western Australia; Haas School of Business

Rugby union career
- Position: Loose forward
- Current team: London Welsh
Amateur team(s)
Years	Team	Apps	(Points)
- Manly
2012–13	Eastern Suburbs	20	(10)
2014	Cottesloe		
Senior career
Years	Team	Apps	(Points)
2012	Rebels	2	(0)
2014–2015	Jersey	7	(0)
2014	→Western Force	1	(0)
2015–	London Welsh		
- Correct as of 12 June 2014
International career
Years	Team	Apps	(Points)
2009	Australia Under-20		

Ryan Hodson (born 10 October 1989) is an Australian rugby union player currently playing for English Championship side London Welsh. His playing position is loose forward.

Hodson has had a nomadic experience as a professional rugby player. He made a couple of appearances for the Melbourne Rebels while providing short-term injury cover in the final weeks of the 2012 Super Rugby season. Not offered a permanent contract for the franchise in 2013, Hodson headed to Europe where he played Championship rugby for Jersey. He made seven appearances in the Channel Islands before heading back to his homeland to play for the Force as a short-term injury replacement during the 2014 Super Rugby season. On 25 April 2015, Hodson signed for Championship rivals London Welsh from the 2015–16 season.
