= Hale School =

High school in Perth, Western Australia

Location
- Wembley Downs, Western Australia; Australia; 31°54′41″S 115°46′51″E

Information
- Type: Independent, day & boarding
- Motto: Duty
- Denomination: Anglican
- Established: 1858
- Sister school: St Mary's
- Chairman: Tim Urquhart
- Head of Senior School: David Bourne
- Deputy Head of Senior School: Simon Hunt
- Head of Year 7: Jackie Hunt
- Head of Junior School: Tim Simpson
- Headmaster: Dean Dell'Oro
- Chaplain: Thomas Couper
- Employees: 257
- Median ATAR: 91.85 (2021)
- Gender: Boys
- Enrolment: ~1,500 (1–12)
- Colours: Oxford blue & Cambridge blue
- Affiliation: Public Schools Association
- Alumni: Old Haleians
- Website: www.hale.wa.edu.au

Hale School is an independent, Anglican day and boarding school for boys, located in Wembley Downs, a western suburb of Perth, Western Australia.

Named after Bishop Mathew Blagden Hale who founded the original school in 1858, Hale School is the oldest private boys' school in Western Australia. The school was originally situated at the Cloisters on St Georges Terrace in Perth, relocated to the Pensioner Guard Barracks at the top of St. Georges Terrace around 1880, and then again relocated to its new Havelock Street premises in 1914 in West Perth. In 1961, the school moved to its current premises in Wembley Downs. The campus now consists of a junior school for Pre-Primary to Year 6, a middle school for Year 7, and a senior school for Years 8 to 12. The school also consists of sporting grounds and boarding facilities for regional and international students.

The school is a member of the Public Schools Association and the Junior School Heads Association of Australia.

Hale's sister school is St Mary's Anglican Girls' School located in Karrinyup, a nearby suburb.

In 2008, Hale School celebrated its sesquicentennial (150th) anniversary.

== History ==
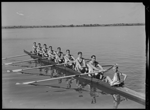
Hale rowing team, 1939

Part of Australia's colonial history, Hale School educated many sons of the Swan River Colony. The school was originally known as the Bishop's Collegiate School and the inaugural chairman was Archibald Paull Burt, a notable jurist.

Modelled on England's public schools, it has been accused of being elitist. For example, in his biography of explorer and politician Sir John Forrest, Frank Crowley described the school's values throughout the 1870s as "a heady compound of social snobbery, laissez-faire capitalism, sentimental royalism, patriotic Anglicanism, benevolent imperialism and racial superiority".

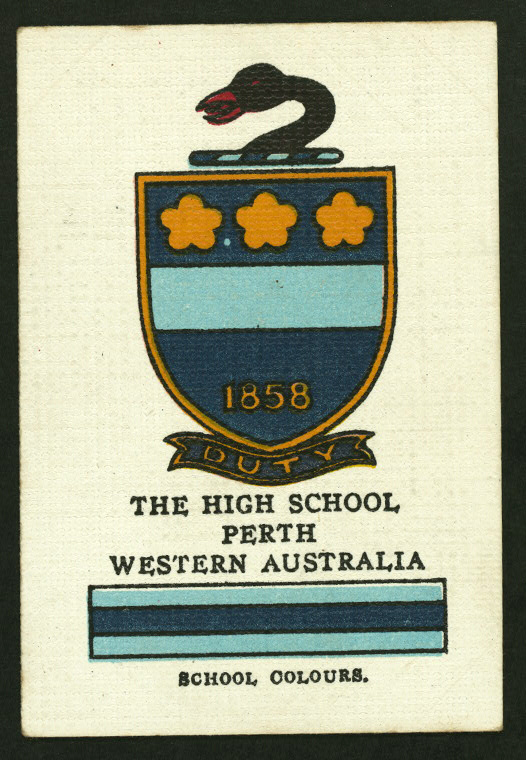
Collectable cigarette card featuring the Hale colours and crest, c. 1920s

In contemporary social commentary, for example Mark Peel's study of class and schooling in Australia, Hale School was identified as one of the most rigorous and selective schools for boys. The scholarship programme included the first full boarding scholarships in Western Australia for Indigenous students.

Since at least 1930, Hale School has misrepresented its association with Bishop Hale's School, falsely claiming for instance that it was initially known as "Bishop Hale's Collegiate School", and later as "The High School". However the two were always completely separate legal entities that coexisted for 10 years – from 1876 until 1885 – under their own separate acts of Parliament.

Bishop Hale's private school commenced in 1858 and was known variously as Bishop’s College, Bishop Hale's School and Bishop’s Collegiate School. In 1863 the Church of England established the Church of England Collegiate School under an 1863 ordinance of the Legislative Council (26 Vict. No. 12). Two years later on 7 September 1865, "Bishop Hale conveyed the school property to the Governors of the Church of England Collegiate School and their successors and assigns for ever—viz., Perth Building Lots H1, and H7. Bishop Hale’s School then became the Church of England Collegiate School, but was better known and spoken of as Hale’s School."

A decade later in 1878 the taxpayer funded secular state High School opened its doors across the road from the Collegiate School. The latter could not compete when its fee-paying students re-enrolled at the new taxpayer sponsored High School. The secular High School effectively and immediately put Hale's School out of business by taking away so many of its students, if not all of them, that it was no longer viable. Nevertheless Hale's School persisted as a legal entity for another eight years until 1885 when the school was dissolved by the Perth Church of England Collegiate School Act 1885 (49 Vict. No. 19).

Exactly 100 years later, in 1958, persistent historical misrepresentations by former High School students were used to convince the Parliament of Western Australia into passing the Hale School Act Amendment Act 1958 (7 Eliz. II No. 34) renaming High School to Hale School – in supposed honour of its purported founder – and the High School Act 1876 (40 Vict. No. 8) became the Hale School Act 1876, converting the secular school into a religious school under the auspices of the Anglican Archbishop as visitor.

== Controversies ==
=== Historical Misrepresentation ===
According to Edith Cowan, Western Australia's first female member of Parliament, the act that evolved out Bishop Hale's School – the Church of England Collegiate School Ordinance 1863 (29 Vict. No. 12) – co-existed with a public secular school instantiated under its own act – the High School Act 1876, creating two independent and theologically opposed legal entities. The latter then took the name Hale School, the commencement date of 1858, and other propaganda associating itself with Bishop Hale, about which Cowan laments:

"It is only those of us who remember Bishop Hale personally and his deeply spiritual and religious type of mind (yet broad and tolerant of the views of others) who can realise the travesty of giving his name to an institution whose foundations are so unmistakably opposite to the principles he invariably upheld. Can it be wondered at that the Diocesan Council takes exception, as do other members of the Church of England, to the present High or Hale School’s use of the old Bishop Hale’s School badge, to the foundation date on its new buildings and the incorrect statement that Bishop Hale founded the High School."

=== Funding Discrepancies ===
The school received approximately $7.45m in jobkeeper subsidies provided by the federal government, due to claimed disruptions caused by the COVID-19 pandemic. These subsidies were the schools second largest income stream, over commonwealth funding, state funding and boarding fees.

At the same time, the school reported $8.31 million dollars in surplus funding, offering lower school fees for parents. Hale declined to comment on what the subsidies were spent on.

== Headlines ==
Hale School made headlines around Australia and internationally when it became the first school to introduce a school policy requiring its students in Year 7 and below to not own a smart device, effective from 2025. This was in the lead up to the Federal Government introducing social media age limit legislation in December 2025. The policy was well supported by parents and the school later reported positive outcomes for students and staff, including better social interactions and less behavioural issues. The following year, the policy was extended to Year 8 students. Several schools around Australia have since introduced a similar policy as parents have become more concerned and aware of the potential risks of the online world.

== Locations ==
Bishop Hale's Collegiate School occupied buildings designed by Richard Roach Jewell in 1858 and situated on St Georges Terrace. The buildings eventually became known as The Cloisters.

In 1914, the High School moved to a more spacious site at Havelock Street, West Perth, opposite the Parliament of Western Australia. Finally, in 1961, the school relocated to its current 480,000 m^{2} (120 acres) premises in Wembley Downs.

== Headmasters ==
Sesquicentenary logo

Period	Details
1858–1863	Canon George Hallett Sweeting
1864	John Bussell (acting)
1864–1869	Rev. FT Taylor
1869–1872	Rev. FA Hare
1872–1878	Col. EW Haynes
1878–1882	Rev. D Davies
1882–1888	T Beuttler
1888–1889	N Millington
1889–1914	FC Faulkner
1915–1928	MA Wilson
1929–1931	PR Le Couteur
1931–1946	MA Buntine
1940–1943	C Hadley (acting)
1946–1960	VS Murphy
1960–1965	JR Prince
1966	L Drake (acting)
1967–1988	KG Tregonning
1989–2002	John Inverarity
2003–2016	Stuart G Meade
2017	David Bean (acting)
2017–	Dean Dell'Oro

== Campus ==
Hale School's campus is a 48-hectare site located in Wembley Downs. The administration building, Memorial Hall, Tom Hoar Dining Hall, Cygnet Theatre, Forrest Library and the Chapel of St Mark are all located on the southwest of the campus near the main entrance. The Memorial Hall was recently renovated, commencing June 2022 and finishing in April of 2024.

The John Inverarity Music and Drama Centre is located on the western side of the campus facing Unwin Avenue. This building separates the Senior School from the Junior School, along with the middle school boarding residence, Brine House. The Peter Wright Technology Building, which houses the Design and Technology Workshop, sits adjacent to the Doug Peake Pool. Adjacent to the swimming pool are the gymnasium and change-rooms.

The senior boarding house is located on the eastern side of the campus while the sports playing fields occupy the north to south-east.

=== Forrest Library ===
The new teaching and learning precinct on the site of the old boarding houses near the south entrance to the campus was officially opened on 1 July 2009. The main feature of this project is the Library and Resource Centre. This includes a dedicated Year 12 study area and Curriculum Support rooms facing a central courtyard. The project also includes a Languages and English block. Beneath the library is a clothing store, IT department and the Old Haleians' Boardroom.

While the library was open for student use from February in the 2009 school year, the official opening ceremony was not held until 1 July 2009, when the facility was officially opened by Andrew Forrest and unveiled as the Forrest Library. It honours members of the Forrest family, from Sir John Forrest to Alexander Forrest, and on to Andrew Forrest himself, who had been educated at Hale.

In 2010 the Australian Institute of Architects awarded the Forrest Library an Architecture Award for Public Architecture.

=== John Inverarity Music and Drama Centre ===
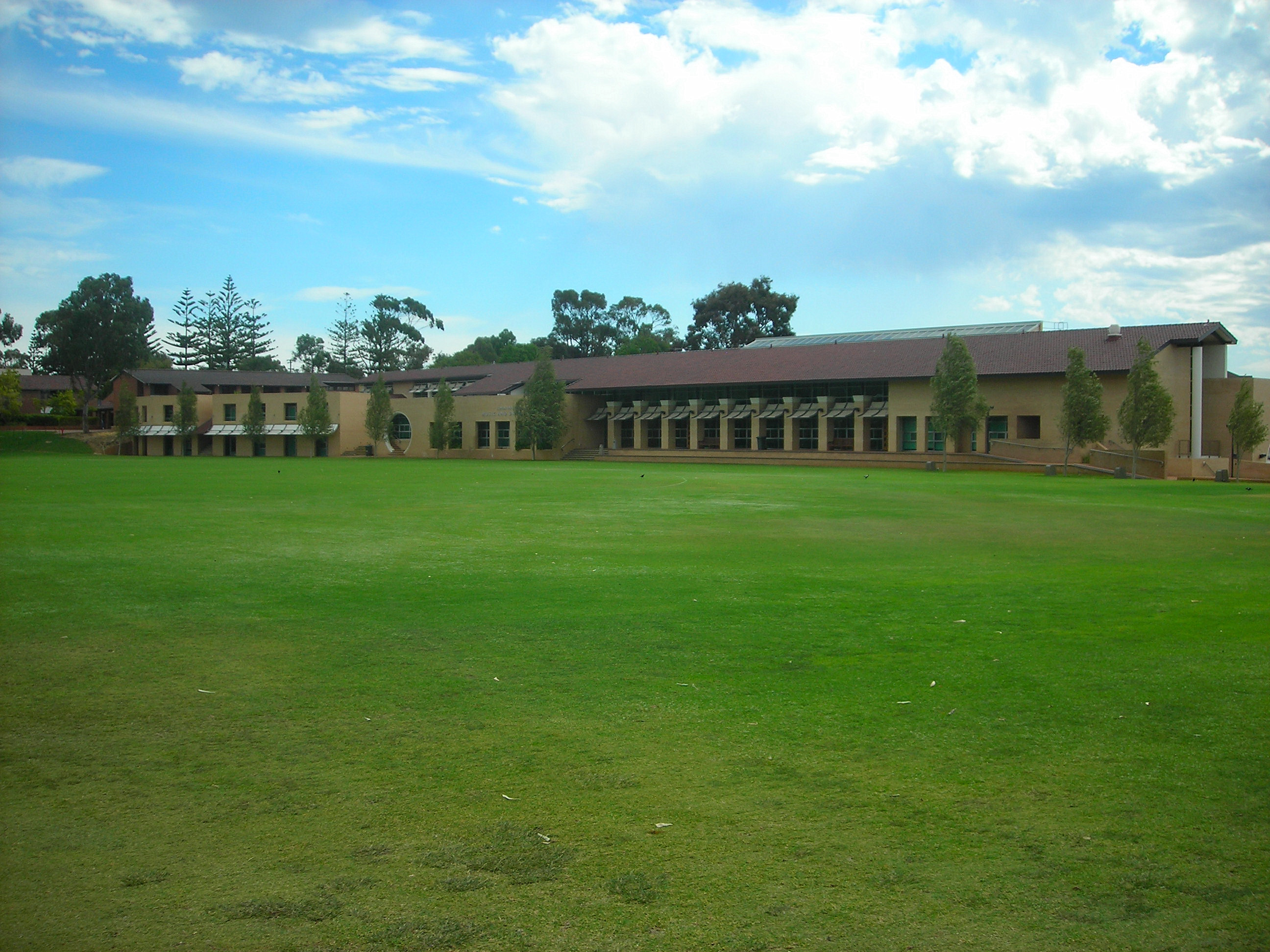
John Inverarity Music and Drama Centre

The John Inverarity Music and Drama Centre comprises a large auditorium/theatre, backstage holding rooms, two main rehearsal studios, percussion and string studios, two large music teaching rooms and 19 music practice rooms. It was first opened for use in January 2001.

The centrepiece of the complex is the timber-lined recital auditorium which accommodates 353 patrons on stepped tiers with a flat performance area 17 metres wide and 12 metres deep. The auditorium design has been dictated by the requirements to have natural acoustics for music. This has been achieved through the use of a traditional 'rectangular box' design with a maximum ceiling height of 8 metres. The auditorium can be tuned for different instruments and various music/drama performances to achieve desired acoustic qualities. This is accomplished by a system of moveable full-height wall reflectors, suspended ceiling reflectors and rotating wall panels with differing degrees of absorptive linings. The ceiling loft is mechanised with 27 variable-speed automatic winch lines which give a great degree of flexibility for a range of shows.

=== Middle School ===
The construction of a middle school facility commenced in January 2009 and was completed in January 2010. The middle school site is located adjacent to Unwin Avenue, between the John Inverarity Music and Drama Centre and the Memorial Hall. The building contains 16 classrooms primarily for Year 7 students. The main entrance, reception and administration offices are located on a separate intermediate level, which is at street level with Unwin Avenue. Other staff facilities are located on the ground floor.

In addition, the facility incorporates one of the school's existing buildings ('L-block' classrooms) which were refurbished as music, drama and science classrooms for Middle school. The ground level of this building was refurbished as a middle school science classroom (and store room), with the upper level refitted to house a drama classroom, music classroom (with store room) and four music practice rooms.

The refurbishment of this building commenced in October 2009 but was not completed in time for the commencement of the school year in February 2010. The new building replaced the 'C-block' classrooms and Senior School Library that previously occupied the site and were demolished in December 2008.

=== Junior School ===
The Hale Junior School was originally built when the Wembley Downs campus was opened. Today, it has classes from pre–primary up to Year 6, with around 400 students enrolled. It was renovated in 2017. It features a modern design with the year groups split up into a Lower Junior (PP to Year 2), Middle Junior (Year 3 and Year 4) and Upper Junior (Year 5 and Year 6). All buildings have open areas, called breakout spaces, where students can work together in small groups or presentations can be held.

Awards include Architecture Award for Education Architecture, Western Australia 2019 and Learning Environments WA Chapter, Category 2: New Construction / New Individual Facility over $8m.

=== Memorial Hall ===
Hale School's Memorial Hall was constructed initially in 1961 and was Western Australia's first brutalist style building. The building has recently undergone renovations to suit the growing needs of the school. The building has a listing on the state Heritage Register.

=== Sporting Facilities ===
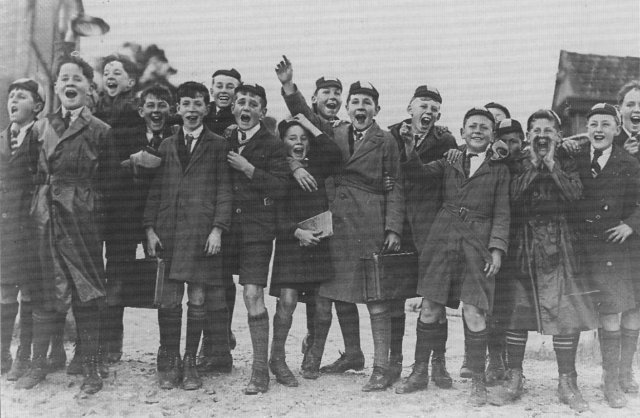
Hale School students at a football match, 1929

Hale School campus includes various sporting facilities, including:

- an eight lane 25-metre geothermally heated swimming pool
- a ten lane 50-metre heated swimming pool
- a gymnasium, with basketball, badminton, volleyball, squash and rock climbing facilities
- weights room
- rowing ergo room
- 16 tennis courts: 12 plexipave, 4 grass
- 4 football fields
- 4 plexipave outdoor basketball courts
- 5 cricket ovals with turf wickets
- 32 cricket practice wickets: both synthetic and turf
- 4 soccer fields
- cross country tracks
- 2 rugby fields
- track and field facilities
- aquaturf surface hockey field with clubrooms
- 3 additional grass hockey ovals
- a rowing fleet housed at Cygnet Hall on the Swan River (off campus)

In 1885, the school entered a team into the West Australian Football Association (WAFA) for its inaugural season, but were forced to withdraw two rounds into the season due to a lack of players.

Hale School has hosted international teams over the years, including the English rugby team on occasions, namely for training during the 2003 Rugby World Cup. The school hosted the English Cricket Academy, including international cricketers Michael Vaughan, Owais Shah, Stuart Broad, Rikki Clarke and Jon Lewis for nets sessions and practice matches, as seen on the front page of The West Australian on 29 November 2006.

== Academic standing ==
Since 2000, Hale School students have won five of the Beazley Medals, awarded to the student obtaining the highest marks in the state administered tertiary entrance examinations.

The school appears regularly in the top 10 schools for the Western Australian Certificate of Education rankings.

Year	% +75 in WACE (Note: Based on the number of Stage 3 course enrolments in the school where a WACE course score of 75 or above was achieved)	State ranking (Note: Ranking of school compared to other schools in the state)	% +65 in WACE (Note: Based on the number of Stage 3 course enrolments in the school where a WACE course score of 65 or above was achieved)	Median ATAR	State ranking	% graduation (Note: Percentage of Year 12 cohort who graduated with a WACE certificate)
2021				91.85		100
2020				90.35		100
2019				92.85		
2018				89.4		
2017				89.3		
2016				89.8		
2015				(prior to ATAR reporting)		
2014	27.09	7	59.89	(prior to ATAR reporting)	5	100
2013	28.17	5	58.59	(prior to ATAR reporting)	5	100
2012	28.77	4	66.95	(prior to ATAR reporting)	3	100
2011	36.69	1	72.14	(prior to ATAR reporting)	2	100
2010	25.73	10	65.47	(prior to ATAR reporting)	8	99.50
2009		6		(prior to ATAR reporting)	2	99.49

== Sport ==
Hale is a member of the Public Schools Association (PSA).

=== PSA premierships ===
Hale has won the following PSA premierships.

- Athletics (14) – 1920, 1921, 1922, 1923, 1924, 1925, 1928, 1934, 1939, 1941, 1992, 2001, 2002, 2017
- Badminton (6) – 2005, 2007, 2008, 2019, 2020, 2025
- Basketball (14) – 1984, 1985, 1986, 1987, 1988, 1989, 1994, 1995, 2008, 2017, 2022, 2024, 2025, 2026
- Cricket (31) – 1905, 1906, 1907, 1909, 1911, 1916, 1922, 1925, 1933, 1934, 1938, 1947, 1948, 1950, 1956, 1961, 1966, 1967, 1976, 1992, 1995, 1999, 2000, 2001, 2002, 2009, 2011, 2019, 2020, 2025, 2026
- Football (23) – 1921, 1939, 1941, 1947, 1966, 1973, 1978, 1984, 1985, 1989, 1995, 1996, 1999, 2001, 2003, 2009, 2010, 2012, 2014, 2016, 2017, 2019, 2025
- Golf (7) – 2004, 2006, 2007, 2010, 2013, 2015, 2024
- Hockey (8) – 1980, 1990, 2012, 2014, 2019, 2021, 2022, 2023
- Rowing (17) – 1933, 1939, 1944, 1945, 1947, 1951, 1952, 1953, 1954, 1955, 1956, 1971, 1983, 1991, 2000, 2018, 2024
- Rugby (26) – 1964, 1965, 1969, 1971, 1974, 1975, 1977, 1980, 1982, 1999, 2001, 2003, 2004, 2005, 2006, 2007, 2008, 2009, 2010, 2011, 2012, 2013, 2014, 2015, 2022, 2025
- Soccer (12) – 1993, 1997, 1998, 1999, 2004, 2005, 2006, 2010, 2018, 2019, 2020, 2023
- Surfing (5) – 2006, 2016, 2017, 2024, 2025
- Swimming (41) – 1919, 1923, 1925, 1926, 1931, 1932, 1933, 1934, 1935, 1936, 1937, 1944, 1965, 1967, 1968, 1969, 1970, 1971, 1972, 1973, 1974, 1975, 1976, 1977, 1978, 1979, 1980, 1981, 1982, 1983, 1984, 1986, 1991, 1992, 1998, 2003, 2013, 2014, 2015, 2016, 2026
- Tennis (18) – 1965, 1966, 1968, 1971, 1972, 1973, 1976, 1977, 1985, 1986, 1997, 1998, 1999, 2003, 2004, 2005, 2006, 2014
- Volleyball (6) – 2019, 2021, 2022, 2023, 2025, 2026
- Water polo (4) – 1997, 2008, 2014, 2015

== Publications ==
Hale School's main publication is the school's official yearbook, The Cygnet, which is released at the start of each year and includes about 250 pages of the previous year's major happenings, school photos and sports results. The school also publishes an alumni magazine, The Haleian, twice a year, usually around June and November.

- History of the School: W. J. Edgar (2008), From Slate to Cyberspace (Hale School, 150 years), Hale School, Wembley Downs, Western Australia
- Book: W. J. Edgar (1994), From Veldt to Vietnam, Haleians at War, Old Haleians' Association, Wembley Downs, Western Australia

== Hale School and the Australian Defence Force ==
Former students have served in all conflicts since the Boer War with many having distinguished military careers.

Corporal Ben Roberts-Smith, Hale Class of 1995, son of Major General Len Roberts-Smith, is currently Australia's most decorated soldier, having been awarded the Victoria Cross and Medal for Gallantry. On 7 April 2026, Roberts-Smith was arrested and charged with five counts of the war crime of murder. On 17 April, he was released on bail.

124 Old Haleians have died in conflicts since the Boer War. A Memorial Grove at the school site honours these men with 124 plaques and a sculpture with an "eternal flame" theme. The great hall of the school has also been named Memorial Hall. The Hale School Museum contains important military and civilian records relating to the school and the state of Western Australia. A small museum display is also located at the Old Hale School, now the Constitutional Centre of Western Australia, on Havelock Street, West Perth.

== Image gallery ==
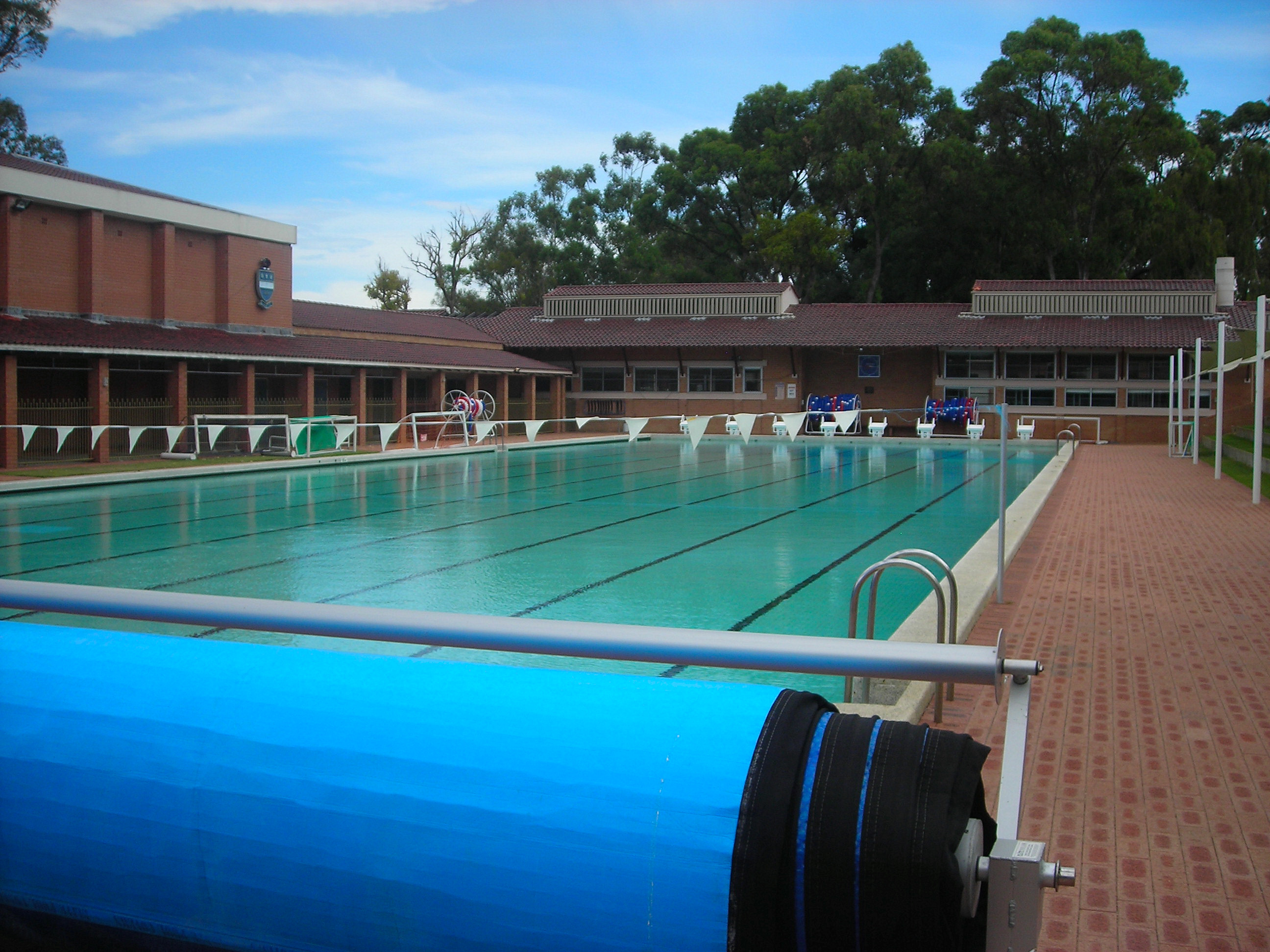
Old Olympic length 8 lane pool, now the location of two basketball courts

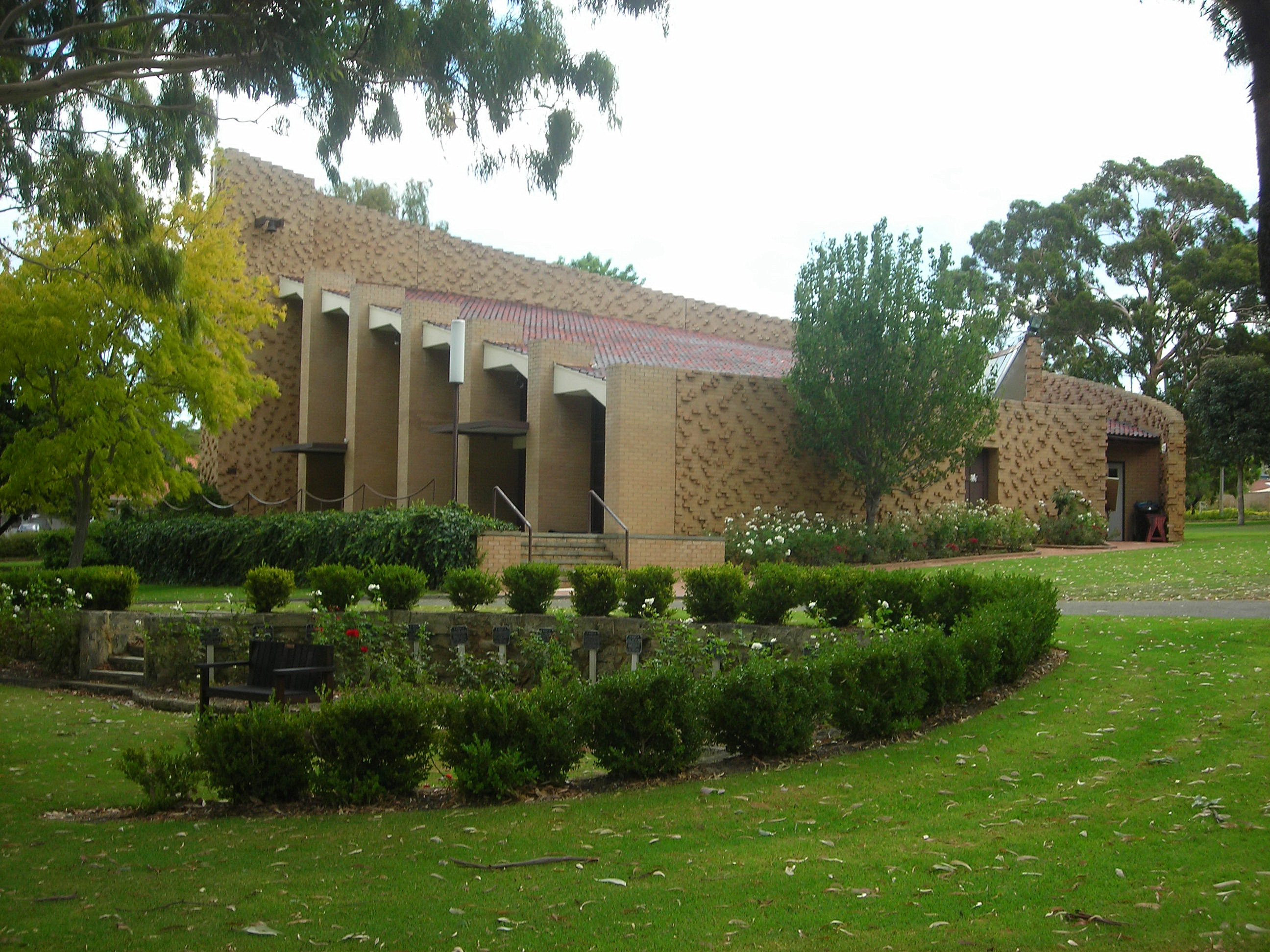
Chapel

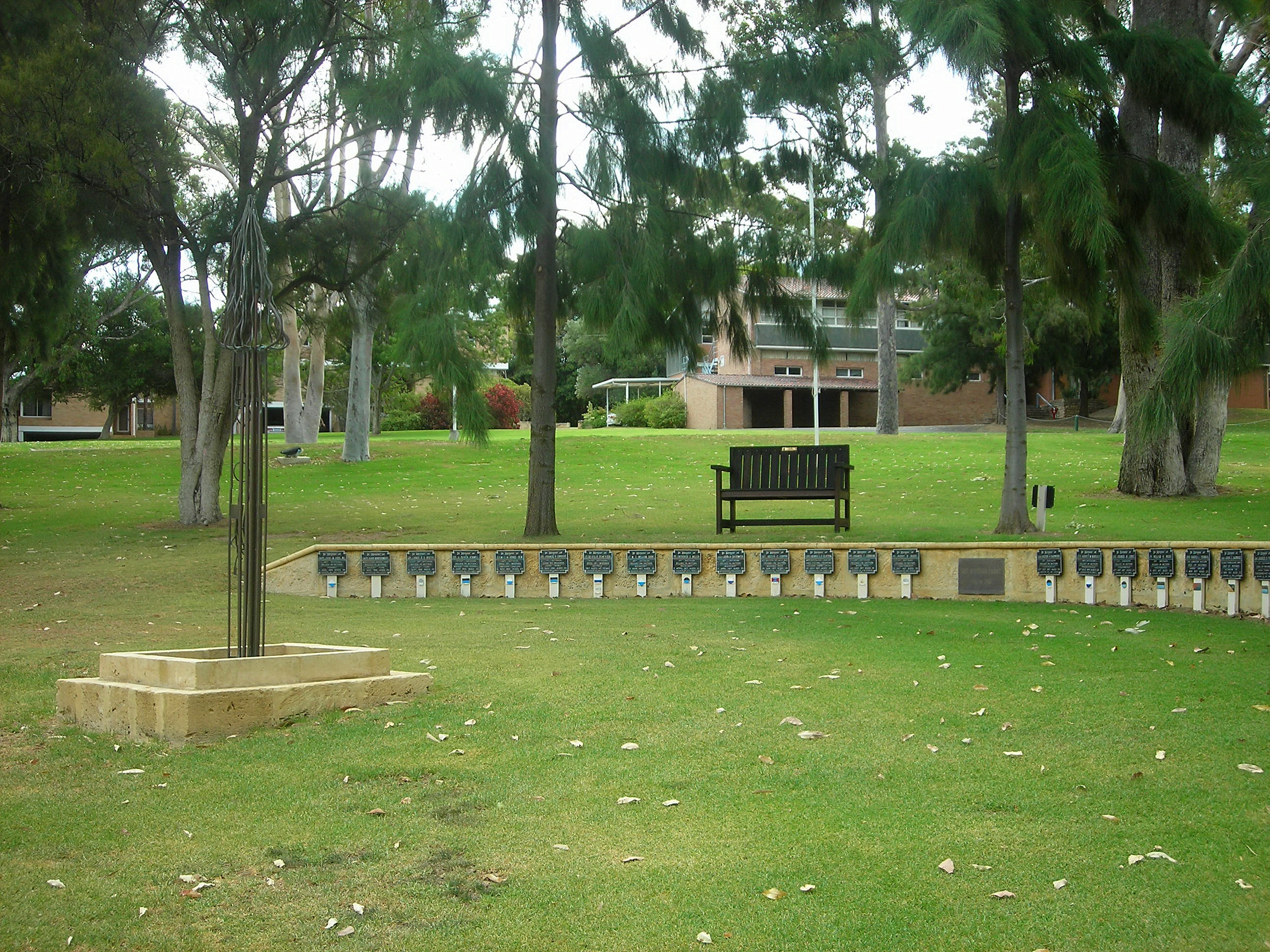
Memorial grove and eternal flame sculpture

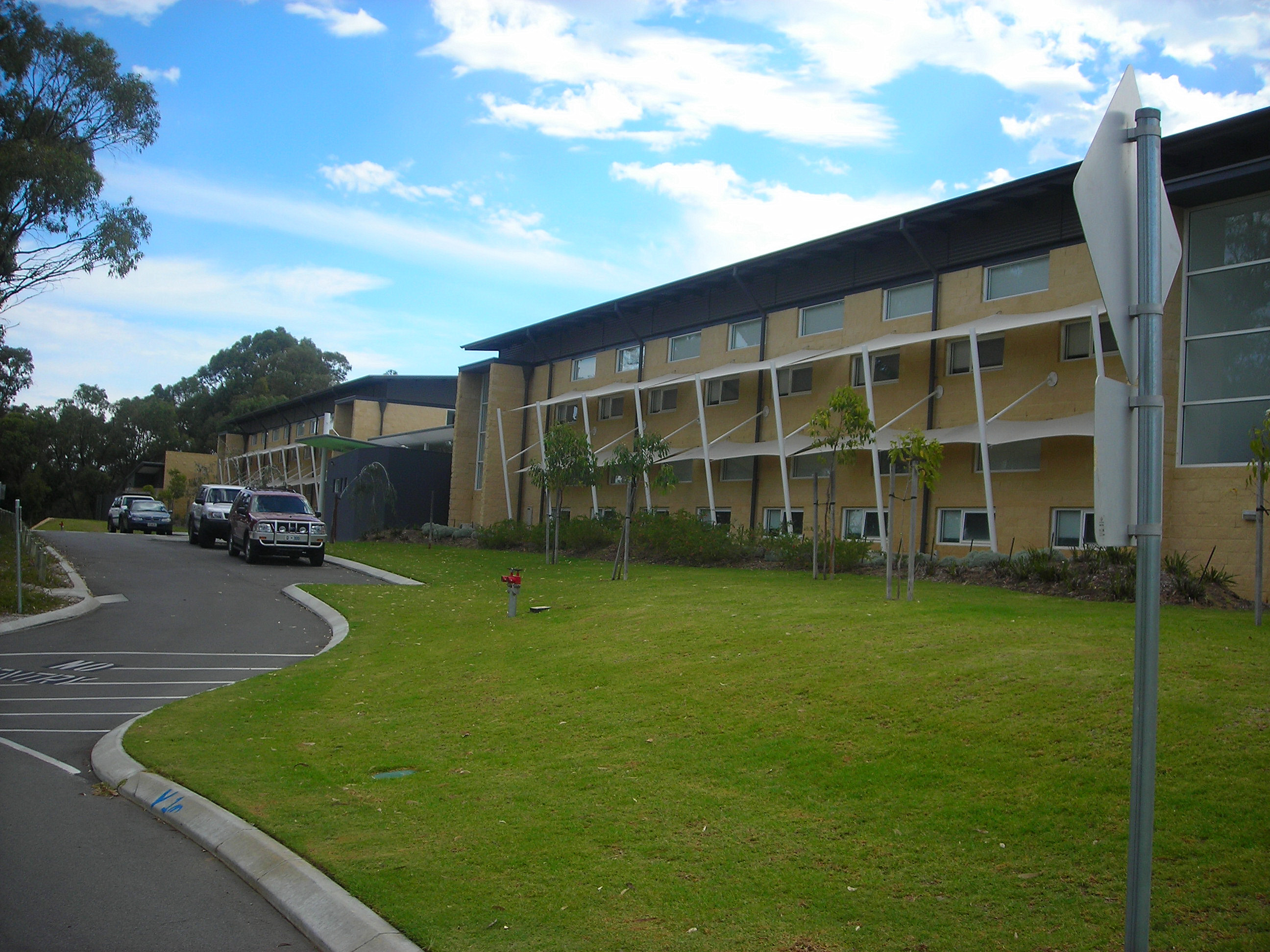
Senior boarding house

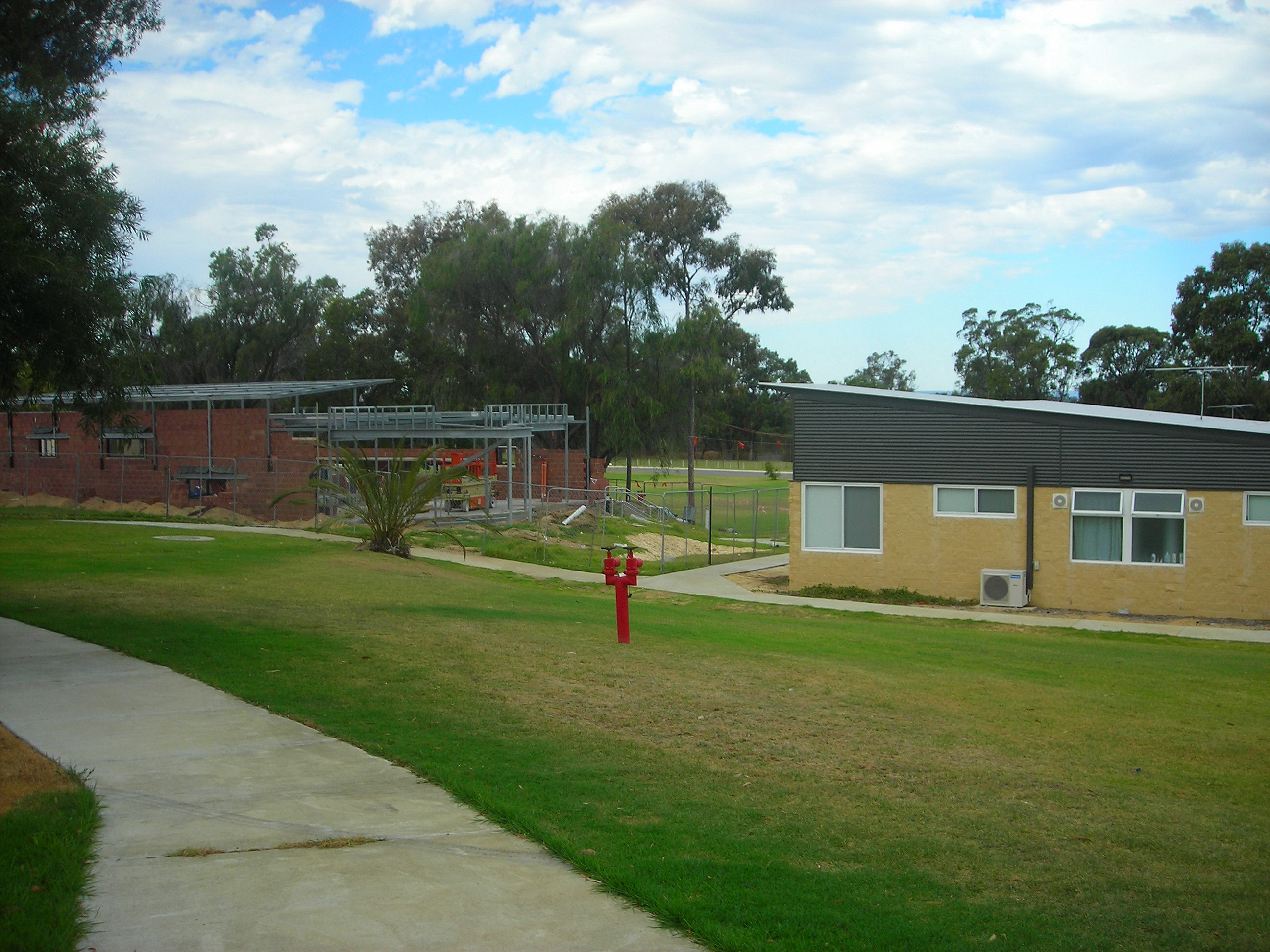
New health centre being constructed next to the senior boarding house (photo from January 2007)

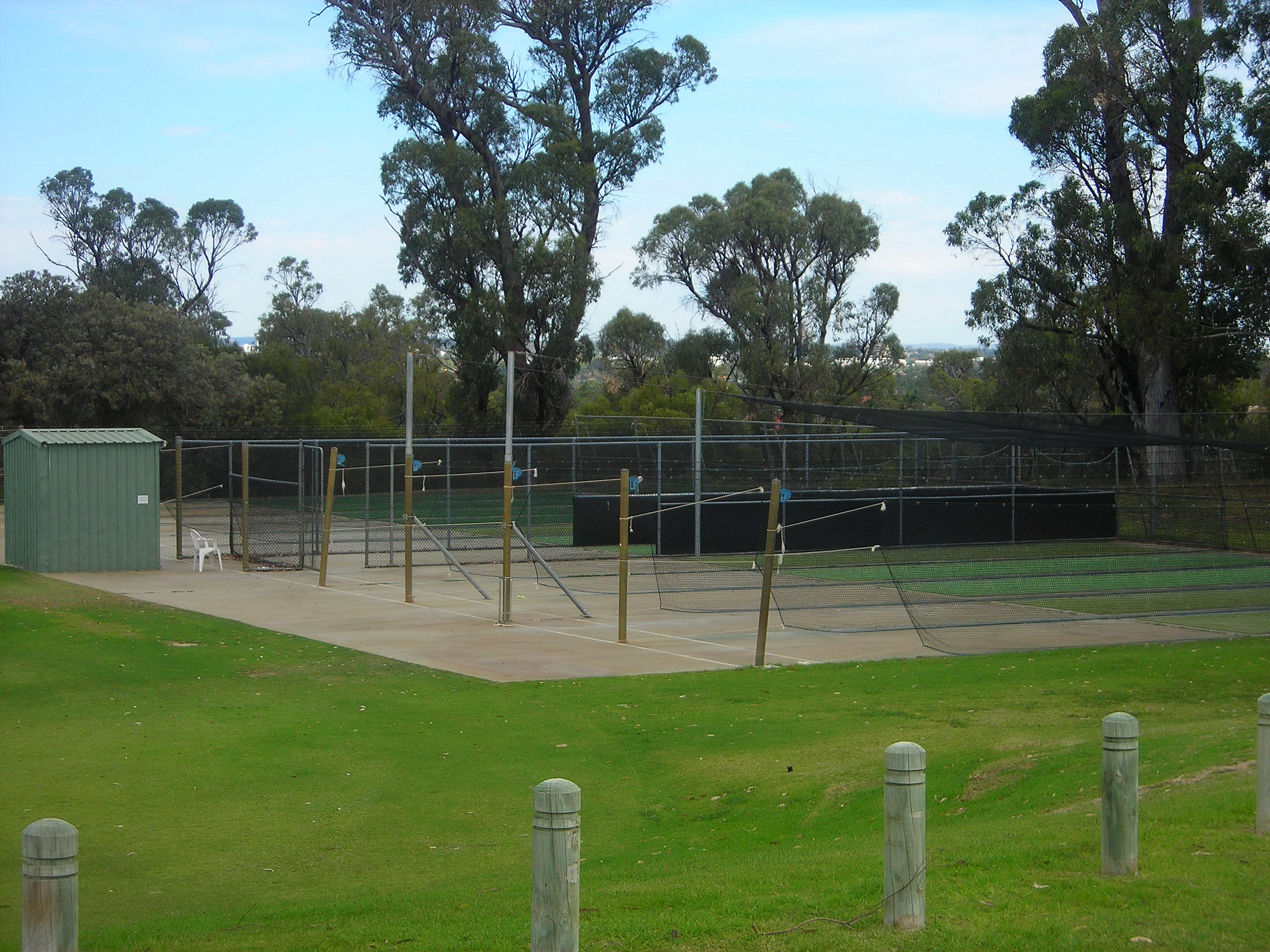
Artificial cricket nets. Turf nets are available in summer

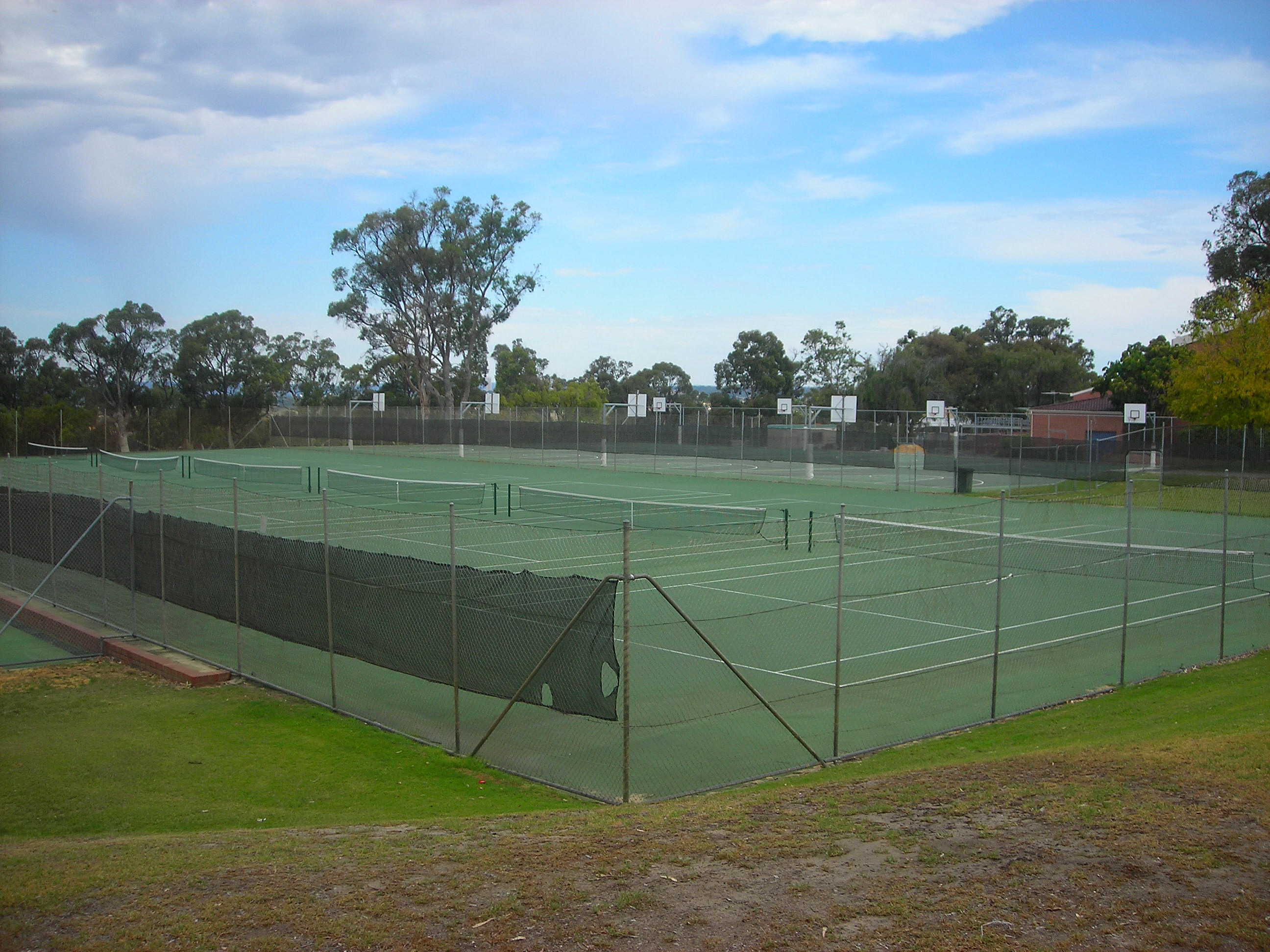
Plexipave tennis and basketball courts

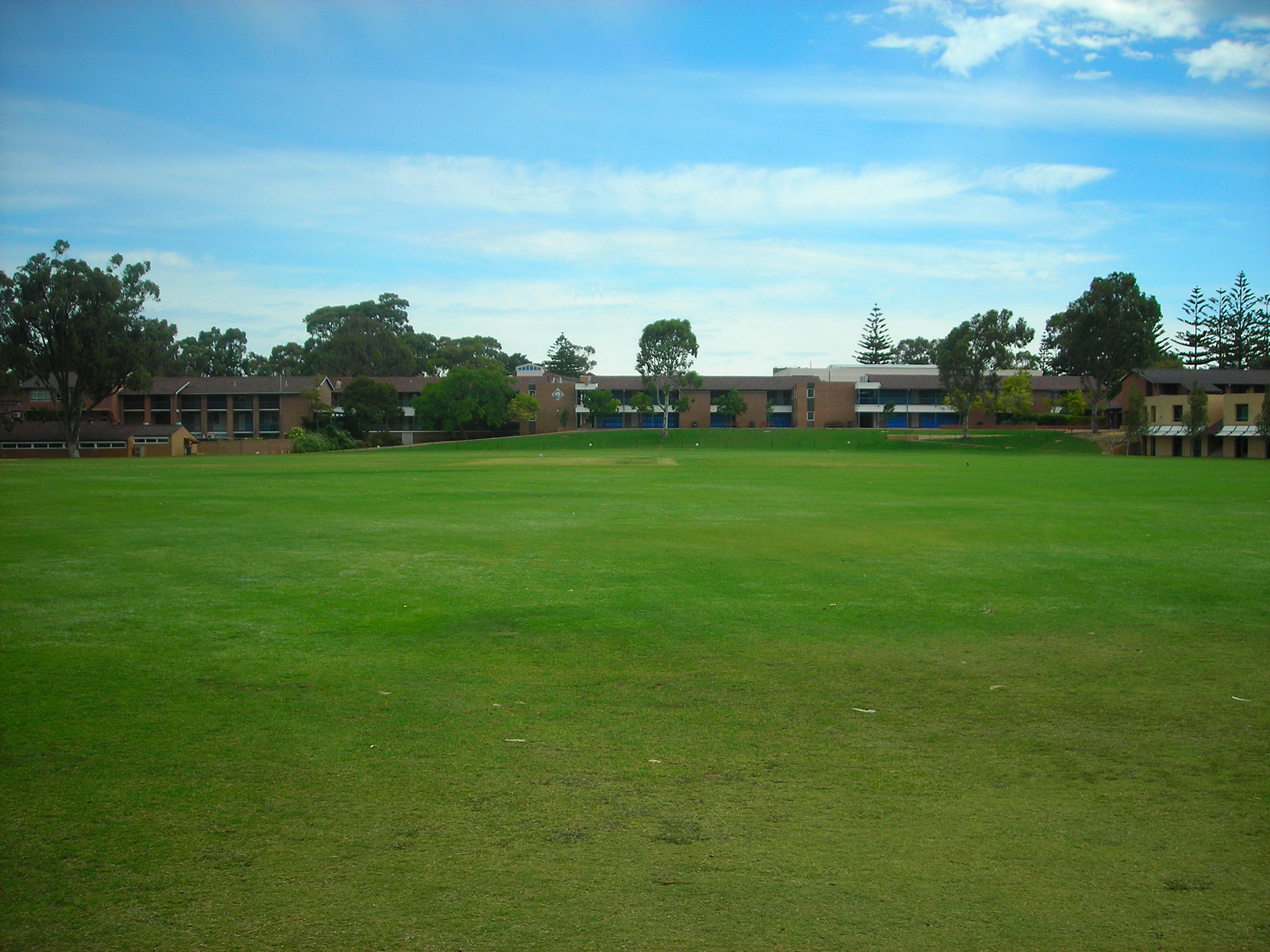
Craig Oval (1st football & cricket team ground)

== Notable alumni ==
An alumnus of Hale School is called an Old Haleian. Notable Old Haleians include:

- Hugo Armstrong – flying ace of the Second World War
- Luke Burton – rugby union player
- Darcy Cameron – AFL footballer
- Alex Condon – basketball player
- Christian de Vietri – artist
- Robert Drewe – author
- Matthew Ebden – professional tennis player
- Jy Farrar – AFL footballer
- Andrew Forrest – entrepreneur
- Sir John Forrest – first premier of Western Australia
- Michael Gardiner – AFL football player
- Mitch Georgiades – AFL footballer
- Lang Hancock – businessman
- Kyron Hayden – AFL footballer
- Dane Haylett-Petty – rugby union player
- Ross Haylett-Petty – rugby union player
- Ryan Hodson – rugby union player
- Lawson Humphries – AFL footballer
- Tunku Ismail Idris – crown prince of Johor
- David Irvine – head of ASIS 2003–09, head of ASIO 2009–14
- Nick Jooste – rugby union player
- Robert Juniper – painter
- Matthew Lutton – theatre and opera director
- Geoff Marsh – cricket player and coach
- Shane McAdam – AFL footballer
- Sam McEntee – Olympic Distance Runner
- Daryl Mitchell – cricketer (New Zealand Blackcap)
- Tom Mitchell – plays AFL football for Hawthorn, 2018 Brownlow Medallist
- Sir Stephen Parker – Chief Justice of Western Australia
- Todd Pearson – Olympic swimming medallist
- Melvin Poh – entrepreneur
- Christian Porter – state and federal politician
- Benjamin Roberts-Smith VC – war criminal, Victoria Cross recipient
- Sam Roberts-Smith – operatic baritone
- Paul Royle – World War II pilot and Stalag Luft III Great Escaper
- Edward Russell – television presenter
- Sharafuddin Idris Shah – Sultan of Selangor, Malaysia
- Marcus Stoinis – cricketer
- Rolly Tasker – sailor
- Justin Turner – rugby union player
- Peter Wright – mining magnate
- Meyne Wyatt – actor, writer
- Basil Zempilas – Lord Mayor of Perth

== See also ==
- List of schools in the Perth metropolitan area
- List of boarding schools in Australia
- List of Anglican schools in Australia
