= Michael Slattery (Gaelic footballer) =

Irish Gaelic footballer

Personal information
- Born: 1866
- Died: 1960 (aged 93–94)

Sport
- Sport: Gaelic football
Club
- Years: Club
- Commercials

Michael Slattery (1866-1960) was an Irish Gaelic footballer. His championship career with the Limerick senior team lasted three seasons from 1887 until 1889.

Slattery made his inter-county debut during the 1887 championship when the Commercials club represented Limerick in the inaugural championship. He won his sole All-Ireland medal that year as Limerick defeated Louth in the final.

== Honours ==
Limerick

- All-Ireland Senior Football Championship (1): 1887
