= Mike Slattery (politician) =

American politician (born 1981)

Member of the Kansas House of Representatives from the 24th district
- In office January 12, 2009 – January 14, 2013
- Preceded by: Ronnie Metsker
- Succeeded by: Emily Perry

Personal details
- Born: September 3, 1981 (age 44) Topeka, Kansas, U.S.
- Party: Democratic
- Spouse: Jenny Slattery
- Relatives: Jim Slattery (father); Linda Slattery (mother)
- Education: Fuqua School of Business; James Madison University
- Website: www.MikeSlattery.org

Mike Slattery (September 3, 1981) is a Democratic former member of the Kansas House of Representatives, representing the 24th district from 2009 to 2013. He is the son of Jim Slattery, who served Kansas's 2nd district from 1983 to 1995. He was the youngest elected member of the Kansas Legislature during his tenure, and the only Democrat to defeat an incumbent in the Kansas House of Representatives in 2008.

Slattery received a Master of Business Administration from Duke University's Fuqua School of Business, as well as a bachelor's degree in Integrated Science and Technology with an emphasis in Energy and Environmental Policy from James Madison University.

He currently works for The Boston Consulting Group in their Washington D.C. office.

== Issue positions ==
During his legislative career, his priorities included supporting public education, alternative energy production, health care reform, and economic development. Slattery served on the House Commerce and Economic Development, Energy and Utilities, and Health and Human Services committees.

== Committee membership ==
- Commerce and Economic Development - Ranking Minority Member
- Energy and Utilities
- Health and Human Services
- Joint Committee on Economic Development
