= Michael Slattery (admiral) =

Royal Australian Naval Reserve officer and lawyer

Rear Admiral the Honourable Justice Michael John Slattery
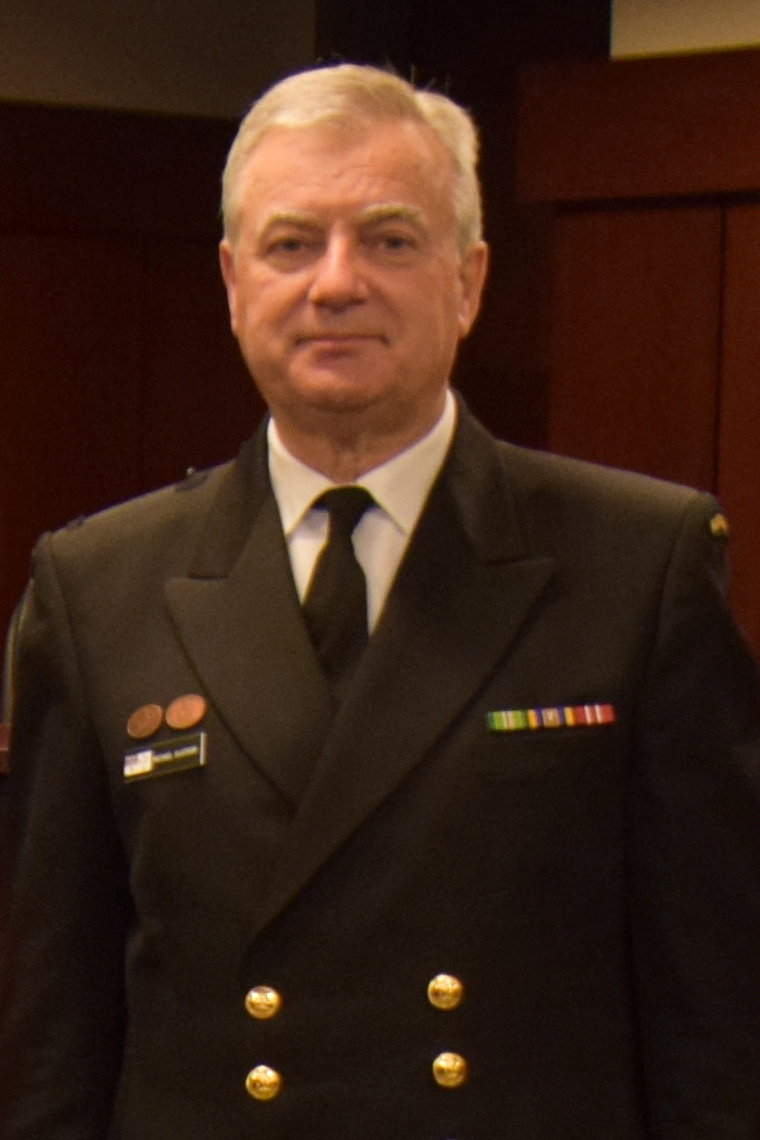

Judge Advocate General of the Australian Defence Force
- In office July 2014 – July 2021
- Preceded by: Richard Tracey
- Succeeded by: Jack Rush

Judge Advocate General of the Navy
- In office 2010–2014

Justice of the Supreme Court of New South Wales
- Incumbent
- Assumed office 25 May 2009

Personal details
- Born: 1954 (age 71–72) Sydney, New South Wales
- Spouse: Melissa
- Education: University of Sydney

Military service
- Allegiance: Australia
- Branch/service: Royal Australian Naval Reserve
- Years of service: 1990–present
- Rank: Rear Admiral
- Battles/wars: Iraq War
- Awards: Member of the Order of Australia

Rear Admiral Michael John Slattery, AM (born 1954) is a Royal Australian Naval Reserve officer and lawyer. He has been a justice of the Supreme Court of New South Wales since 2009 and was the Judge Advocate General of the Australian Defence Force from July 2014 until July 2021.

== Legal career ==
Slattery graduated from the University of Sydney with degrees in arts (1975) and law (1977). He became a barrister in 1978, Queen's Counsel in 1992 and justice of the Supreme Court of New South Wales in 2009. He joined the Royal Australian Navy Reserve as a Lieutenant in Supply Branch – Legal in 1990. He rose through the ranks and was appointed Judge Advocate General – Navy (as commodore) in 2010 and Judge Advocate General – ADF (as rear admiral) in 2014.

Slattery has been appointed a Member of the Order of Australia (AM) twice: he was appointed in the Military Division in the 2019 Queen's Birthday Honours for "exceptional service to military law". In the 2022 Australia Day Honours, Slattery was again appointed a Member, this time in the General Division, for "significant service to the law, to the judiciary, and to professional legal associations".
