= Len Roberts-Smith =

Australian judge

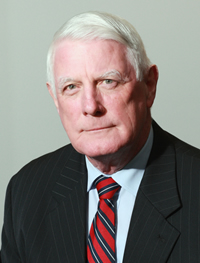
- Born: 25 October 1946 (age 80); Adelaide, South Australia
- Children: Ben Roberts-Smith; Sam Roberts-Smith
- Military career
- Allegiance: Australia
- Branch: Australian Army Reserve
- Service years: 1964–2007
- Rank: Major General
- Commands: Judge Advocate General
- Awards: Commander of the Order of St John; Reserve Force Decoration
- Other work: Justice of the Supreme Court of Western Australia; Court of Appeal Judge

Major General Leonard William Roberts-Smith, RFD, KC (born 25 October 1946) is a former Justice of the Supreme Court of Western Australia. From February 2005, he was one of the inaugural Judges of the Court of Appeal Division, having been first appointed to the Supreme Court on 6 November 2000. From May 2007, he served as Commissioner of the Corruption and Crime Commission of Western Australia, having been appointed for a five-year term. He retired on 31 January 2011.

== Early life and family ==
Born in Adelaide, South Australia, on 25 October 1946 to Doreen Roberts and Norman Smith, Roberts-Smith was educated at Saint Ignatius' College, Adelaide, and graduated in law from the University of Adelaide in 1969. Roberts-Smith and his wife Sue have two sons, Ben and Sam.

== Legal career ==
After graduating, Roberts-Smith went to Papua New Guinea in 1970, where he held various positions in the Crown Law Department, ultimately becoming Chief Crown Prosecutor. On Independence in 1975, he became the first public prosecutor under the new Constitution. As public prosecutor, he had responsibility for all criminal prosecutions throughout the country. He returned to South Australia in 1976 and became a stipendiary magistrate. In 1978, he was appointed the foundation director of the Legal Aid Commission of Western Australia and held this position for 11 years. In February 1989, he returned to private practice, as a barrister, and was appointed a Queen's Counsel in December 1989.

Roberts-Smith held numerous prominent community positions. He was a former chairman of the Citizens' Advice Bureau of WA (Inc), chairman of the State Advisory Panel for Translators and Interpreters, and the president of the Civil Rehabilitation Council of WA (Inc) from 1980 to 1982. He chaired the State Government Committee of Review into the Administration of Criminal Justice in Queensland in 1993, which reported in September that year. He was counsel to the WA Parliamentary Committee on Delegated Legislation from 1989 to 1998. In 1989, he was appointed deputy president, and in 2000, president of the Equal Opportunity Commission of Western Australia.

Roberts-Smith has been an accredited Australian Advocacy Institute teacher since 1992 and was a member of the Legal Practice Board of WA between 1989 and 2000. Between 1992 and 2000, he was deputy chairman of the Legal Practitioners Complaints Committee. From 1999 to 2000, he was chair of the Murdoch University Board of Discipline, before resigning upon his appointment to the Bench. In 2002, prior to his appointment to the Bench, he conducted a Ministerial Review into the Western Australia Witness Protection Program and the death of a protected witness.

== Military career ==
Roberts-Smith joined the Australian Army Reserve in 1964, being commissioned as a second lieutenant (Royal Australian Infantry) in 1969. When he moved to Port Moresby in 1970, Roberts-Smith transferred to the Australian Army Legal Corps as a reservist with the rank of captain. During his time in Papua New Guinea, he was promoted to major. In 1985, he was appointed a judge advocate and a defence force magistrate. He was promoted to lieutenant colonel in 1986 and colonel in June 1994. On 6 June 2002, Roberts-Smith was appointed Judge Advocate General (JAG) of the Australian Defence Force and was promoted to major general, having been acting in the position since 3 October 2001. As JAG, Roberts-Smith was responsible for reporting annually to Parliament on the operation of the Defence Force Discipline Act 1982 and any other Commonwealth or Australian Capital Territory law relating to the discipline of the Defence Force. He was also responsible for making procedural rules for Service tribunals, providing the final legal review of proceedings with the Defence Force, and participating in the appointment of Judge Advocates, Defence Force Magistrates, Presidents and members of the courts martial. His appointment to the substantive position was for a three-year term. In 2005, he was reappointed by the Governor-General of Australia for a further two years.

On 26 November 2012 the Australian Government Minister for Defence, Stephen Smith, announced that Roberts-Smith had been appointed chair of an independent Defence Abuse Response Taskforce (DART), to deal with individual complaints of sexual and other abuse in the Australian Defence Force.

== See also ==
- Judiciary of Australia
