= 1887 All-Ireland Senior Football Championship =

Football championship

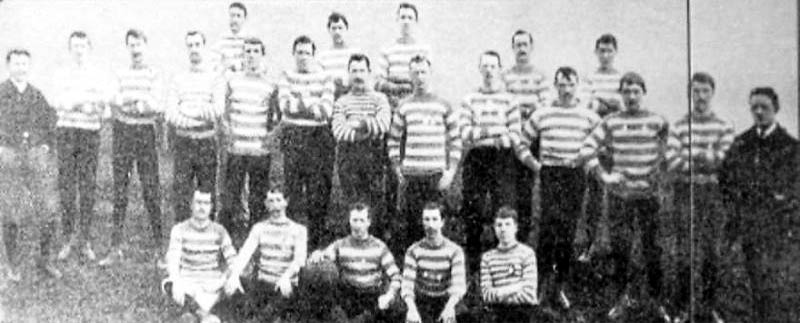

All-Ireland Champions
- Winning team: Limerick (1st win)
- Captain: Denis Corbett

All-Ireland Finalists
- Losing team: Louth

Provincial Champions
- Munster: Not played
- Leinster: Not played
- Ulster: Not played
- Connacht: Not played

Championship statistics

The 1887 All-Ireland Senior Football Championship is the first edition of GAA's premier inter-county Gaelic football tournament, played between 12 counties of Ireland. The tournament featured club teams who represented their respective counties after their county championship. The 21 a-side final was between Commercials of Limerick and Young Irelands of Louth. The final was played in Beech Hill, Donnybrook on April 29, 1888, with Commercials winning by 1–4 to 0–3. Unlike later All-Irelands, there were no provincial championships and it was an open draw.

== Format ==
The 1887 championship was the only to be held as an open-draw knockout tournament, without provincial championships.

== Representative clubs ==
From 1887 until 1891 the club champions represented the whole county. In the very first All-Ireland championship the participating counties were represented by the following clubs:

County	Club
Clare	
Cork	Lees
Kilkenny	Kilmacow
Limerick	Commercials
Louth	Dundalk Young Irelands
Meath	Dowdstown
Tipperary	
Waterford	Ballyduff Lower
Wexford	Castlebridge

== Results ==
=== First round ===
24 July 1887
First round

Louth	1–8–2 – 0–4–1	Waterford
Charles McAlester (goal)

Elm Park, Merrion, Dublin
Attendance: 10,000
Referee: Willie Halpin (Clare)

24 July 1887
First round

Limerick	3–2 – 0–2	Meath

Elm Park, Merrion, Dublin
Attendance: 10,000

24 July 1887
First round

Kilkenny	0–4 – 0–0	Cork

Dungarvan

N/A
First round

Tipperary	w/o – scr.	Dublin

N/A
First round

Wexford	w/o – scr.	Galway

N/A
First round

Clare	w/o – scr.	Wicklow

=== Second round ===
28 August 1887
Second round

Louth	0–7–3 – 0–5–3	Wexford

St. Patrick’s club grounds, Kilmainham
Attendance: 5,000
Referee: J.K. Bracken (Tipperary)

25 September 1887
Second round

Tipperary	1–2 – 0–2	Clare

Bansha, Tipperary

28 August 1887
Second round

Limerick	1–10 – 1–10	Kilkenny

St. Patrick’s club grounds, Kilmainham
Attendance: 5,000

1887
Second Round Replay

Limerick	1–3 – 0–5	Kilkenny

Bansha

=== Semi-final ===
11 March 1888
Semi-final

Limerick	1–1 – 0–0	Tipperary

Bohermore

- Louth received a Bye into the All-Ireland final

=== Final ===
29 April 1888
Final

Limerick	1–4–0 – 0–3–0	Louth

Beech Hill, Donnybrook, Dublin
Referee: John Cullinane (Tipperary)

== Miscellaneous ==
- No Provincial championships in the first year of the championship.
