= Raelene Sharp (barrister) =

Australian barrister

Raelene Sharp KC
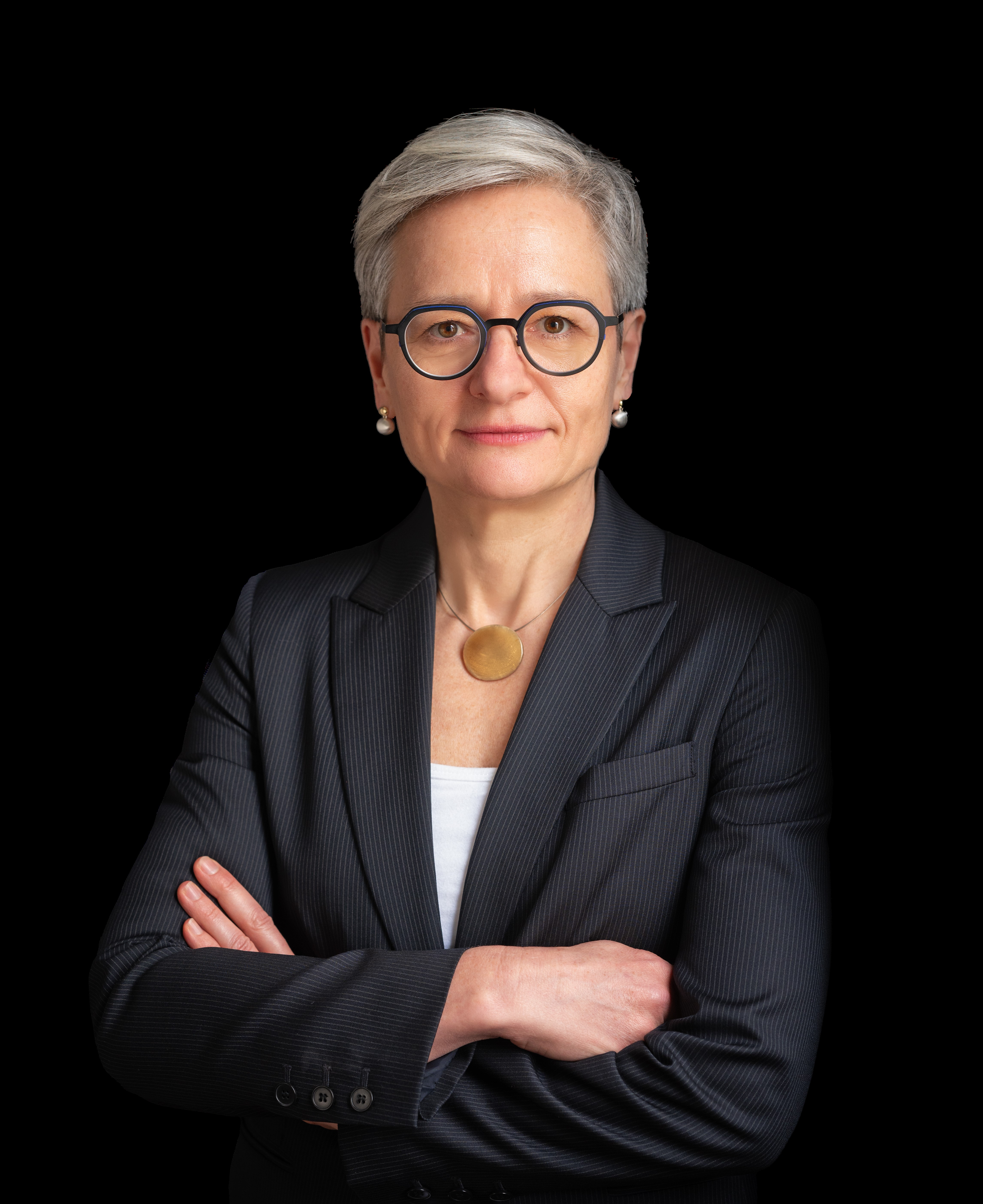

9th Director of the Office of the Commonwealth Director of Public Prosecutions
- Incumbent
- Assumed office 4 December 2023
- Nominated by: The Hon Mark Dreyfus KC MP, Attorney-General of Australia
- Preceded by: The Hon Justice Sarah McNaughton SC

Career

Personal details
- Education: LL.M. (Public International Law: International Criminal Law); BA (Linguistics), LL.B
- Alma mater: Leiden University; Monash University; Melbourne University
- Profession: Barrister

Raelene Sharp KC is an Australian barrister. She was appointed as the Director of Public Prosecutions in December 2023. The Director is the head of the Office of the Commonwealth Director of Public Prosecutions. Sharp's diverse work has seen her advise and act in domestic and international investigative, regulatory and criminal matters, including in Lebanon for the United Nations.

Sharp's formal qualifications include degrees from Monash University, the University of Melbourne and Leiden University. Sharp completed her articles at the Victorian Office of Public Prosecutions in 2000.

Sharp was called to the Victorian Bar in 2010, reading with Mark Rochford KC and now Justice of Appeal Stephen Donaghue. Sharp has been awarded an Indictable Crime Certificate and was appointed senior counsel ("took Silk") in 2022, with letters-patent for King's counsel the following year.

== Education ==
Sharp earned an (Honours) Arts degree in linguistics from Monash University in 1998. She has a Bachelor of Laws (Honours) from the University of Melbourne and a Master of Laws in public international law – international criminal law (cum laude) from Leiden University.

== Career ==
Sharp "has over 25 years of experience in both domestic and international legal domains," specialising in criminal law, investigative law and administrative law. After completing her articles, Sharp moved to the Netherlands to further her legal education.

Sharp's career began as a prosecutor at the state Director of Public Prosecutions (Victoria) (DPP). After two years, Sharp moved to the Netherlands to complete a Master's in public international law, specialising in international criminal law.

Sharp was a research assistant to Professor John Dugard, the former Special Rapporteur to the UN Commission on Human Rights on violation of Human Rights and International Humanitarian Law. In the "International Law Commission Annual Report (2003)" the Special Rapporteur John Dugard "acknowledged, with gratitude" the work undertaken by Sharp on the report into the "Diplomatic protection of corporations and shareholders".

Sharp returned to Melbourne and the OPP for a short time before moving to the Australian Crime Commission (ACC) in 2004. From 2006 until 2009, Sharp was legal officer at the United Nations in Lebanon, working on the investigation into the assassination of Rafic Hariri, the former prime minister, and a number of other related assassinations under the Special Tribunal for Lebanon. Upon her return to Australia in 2009 she resumed her work at the Victoria DPP for a short time, before moving to the ACC. (Note: Now the Australian Criminal Intelligence Commission (ACIC)) The ACC appointed her their principal specialist lawyer in 2005.

Sharp was asked to return to the Middle East as a Special Rapporteur and a member of an independent fact-finding commission, instituted by the Arab League, looking into Israel's Gaza War "Operation Cast Lead", under the Special Tribunal for Lebanon. The investigation focused on the Israeli operation in December and January 2009.

=== Barrister & Taking Silk ===
Sharp was called to the Victorian Bar in 2010, reading with Mark Rochford KC and now Justice of Appeal Stephen Donaghue. Peter Hanks KC was her senior mentor.

Described as the "ultimate prize for most barristers", "taking silk" and obtaining the "coveted" title Kings Counsel/Senior Counsel is an extremely detailed and rigorous process. The Victorian Bar says it involves the Chief Justice of the Supreme Court of Victoria, the Chief Justice Anne Ferguson, consulted the heads of over 15 national and state judicial bodies to determine "whether a legal professional whose skill, integrity, independence, and standing in the profession justify an expectation on the part of the public and the judiciary that they will provide outstanding services, as counsel, to the administration of justice".

=== Special Investigator ===
Sharp also worked at the Office of the Special Investigator (OSI) – under former CDPP and criminal law guru Mark Weinberg KC. Sharp worked as counsel assisting the Special Investigator appointed to investigate possible breaches of the laws of armed conflict allegedly committed by members of the Australian Defence Force in Afghanistan from 2005 to 2016.

== Notes ==
Legal offices
Preceded by Sarah McNaughton	Commonwealth Director of Public Prosecutions; 2023–	Succeeded by Incumbent
