= Office of the Special Investigator =

Australian war crimes investigator

Agency overview
- Formed: 4 January 2021
- Jurisdiction: Commonwealth of Australia
- Headquarters: Canberra, Australian Capital Territory
- Employees: 120 (ASL, 2025–26)
- Minister responsible: Attorney-General of Australia
- Agency executive: Chris Moraitis, Director-General
- Parent department: Attorney-General's portfolio
- Website: www.osi.gov.au

The Office of the Special Investigator (OSI) is an Australian Commonwealth executive agency that investigates alleged criminal offences under Australian law arising from or related to breaches of the laws of armed conflict by Australian Defence Force personnel in Afghanistan between 2005 and 2016. OSI works with the Australian Federal Police and refers briefs of evidence to the Commonwealth Director of Public Prosecutions.

== History ==
On 12 November 2020 the Prime Minister announced the decision to establish OSI following the release of the Brereton Report into alleged war crimes by Australian special forces in Afghanistan. The agency was created as an executive agency under section 65 of the Public Service Act 1999 by an order of the Governor-General dated 10 December 2020, which commenced on 4 January 2021.

== Role and functions ==
Under the establishment order and portfolio arrangements, OSI:

- reviews findings of the Inspector-General of the Australian Defence Force Afghanistan Inquiry
- works with the Australian Federal Police to investigate alleged criminal offences under Australian law related to breaches of the laws of armed conflict
- develops briefs of evidence for referral to the Commonwealth Director of Public Prosecutions
- undertakes other relevant tasks requested by the Prime Minister and the Attorney-General.

== Governance ==
OSI is an independent executive agency in the Attorney-General's portfolio and is listed under Schedule 1 to the Public Governance, Performance and Accountability Rule 2014. Chris Moraitis PSM serves as Director-General. The Special Investigator is the Hon Mark Weinberg AC FAAL KC, supported by a Director of Investigations.

== Resources and staffing ==
According to the 2025–26 Portfolio Budget Statements, OSI's total resourcing for 2025–26 is $57.5 million, with an Average Staffing Level of 120 in 2025–26, down from 162 in 2024–25. OSI publishes annual reports and budget information through the Transparency Portal.

== Investigations and proceedings ==
On 20 March 2023 a joint OSI and AFP investigation resulted in the first charge of a war crime under Australian law against a former Special Air Service Regiment soldier, Oliver Schulz. He was charged with one count of war crime - murder under subsection 268.70(1) of the Criminal Code Act 1995. Subsequent court proceedings and media reporting have confirmed he is expected to face trial, with dates subject to national security processes.

On 7 April 2026 Ben Roberts-Smith was arrested, and is charged with five counts of the war crime of murder.

== See also ==
- War crimes in Afghanistan
- David McBride
