= Chris Moraitis =

Australian public servant

Chris Moraitis PSM
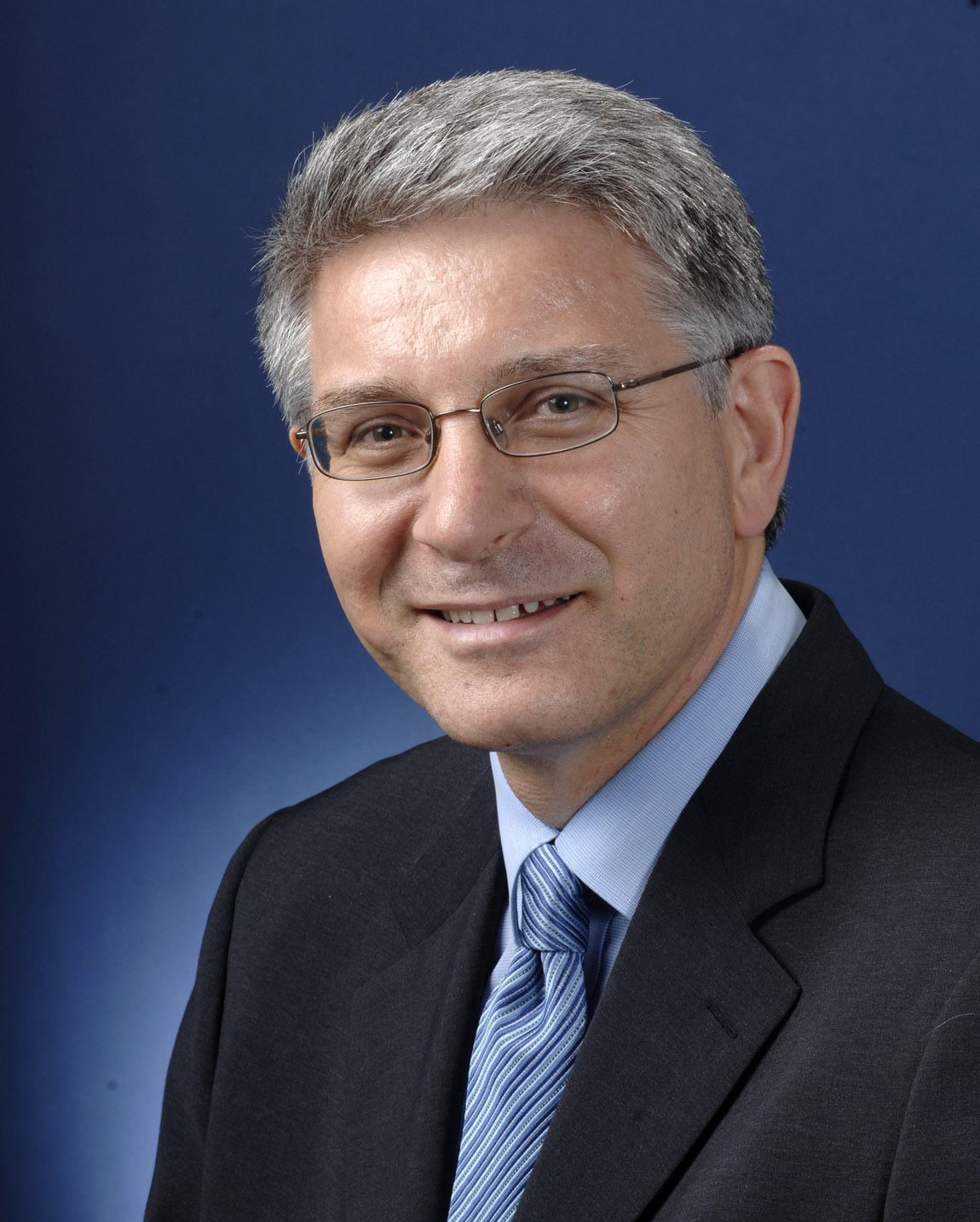

Director General of the Office of the Special Investigator
- In office 4 January 2021 – 4 January 2026

Secretary of the Attorney-General's Department
- In office 15 September 2014 – 15 September 2021
- Attorney-General: George Brandis; Christian Porter; Michaelia Cash
- Preceded by: Roger Wilkins
- Succeeded by: Katherine Jones

High Commissioner of Australia to Papua New Guinea
- In office December 2006 – February 2010
- Preceded by: Michael Potts
- Succeeded by: Ian Kemish

Personal details
- Born: Christos Moraitis; 1962 (age 63–64) Melbourne, Victoria
- Education: University of Melbourne; Australian National University
- Occupation: Public servant

Christos "Chris" Moraitis, PSM (born 1962) is a senior Australian public servant, serving as Director-General of the Office of the Special Investigator.

== Life and career ==
Moraitis was born in Melbourne in 1962. He joined the Australian Public Service in the Department of Foreign Affairs and Trade in 1989 as a Graduate Trainee.

Moriatis was Senior Legal Adviser in the Department of Foreign Affairs and Trade from November 2002 to December 2006, Australian High Commissioner to Papua New Guinea from 2006 to 2009 and, in April 2013, he was appointed a Deputy Secretary at Foreign Affairs and Trade. He served less than 18 months in the role before being promoted in September 2014 to head the Attorney-General's Department, his first job outside Foreign Affairs and Trade since he commenced his public service career. In 2021 he commenced as Director-General of the Office of the Special Investigator, the Special Investigator being Mark Weinberg. The agency was established following the completion of the Brereton Report. While originally coming under the Department of Home Affairs, this agency was moved to the portfolio of the Attorney-General of Australia, its task being the investigation of possible war crimes in Afghanistan by Australian forces.

== Awards ==
Moraitis was awarded a Public Service Medal in June 2014 for "outstanding public service to Australia's international affairs as Australia's High Commissioner to Port Moresby and in senior legal and corporate roles at the Department of Foreign Affairs and Trade".

Diplomatic posts
Preceded by Michael Potts	High Commissioner of Australia to Papua New Guinea; 2006–2009	Succeeded by Ian Kemish
Government offices
Preceded by Roger Wilkins	Secretary of the Attorney-General's Department; 2014–2021	Succeeded by Katherine Jones
