= Mark Willacy =

Australian journalist

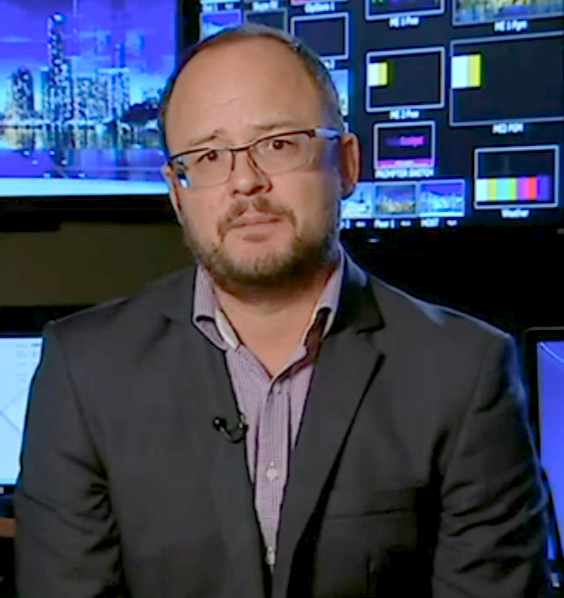
- In a Lowy Institute video in 2018
- Occupation: Journalist

Mark Willacy is an Australian investigative journalist for the Australian Broadcasting Corporation (ABC).

In 2023, Willacy was found to have defamed Heston Russell, a former special forces commander, after making unproven allegations of war crimes.

== Career ==
Willacy was a Middle East region correspondent based in Jerusalem from 2002 to 2006. He covered the Israeli-Palestinian conflict and spent 93 days in and around Iraq reporting on the 2003 Iraq war with cameraman Louie Eroglu.

From 2008 to 2013 he was a North Asia region correspondent based in Tokyo, where he covered the 2011 Tōhoku earthquake and tsunami, and Fukushima Daiichi nuclear disaster. He also reported from the Korean peninsula and had an exclusive interview in 2013 with former North Korean agent Kim Hyon-hui who is known for the bombing of Korean Air Flight 858.

=== Awards ===
Willacy has won an Australian Walkley Award seven times for his journalism. This includes awards for coverage of the Iraq War in 2003, the 2011 Tōhoku earthquake and tsunami and Fukushima Daiichi nuclear disaster in 2011, Australian environmental contamination in 2015 (with producer Mark Solomons), a Four Corners report into the Tham Luang cave rescue, and for an investigation with producer Alexandra Blucher into local government corruption.

In 2010, he was awarded local Queensland Clarion Awards' Journalist of the Year for his investigation into the Mindanao massacre in the Philippines, and again in 2019, for his Four Corners investigation into children being locked up in adult watch houses.

Willacy was awarded a Eureka Prize in 2011 for Environmental Journalism in reporting of alleged systemic corruption inside Japan's scientific whaling program.

In 2019, Willacy was part of the Four Corners team that won the Logie Award for Most Outstanding News Coverage or Public Affairs Report for their Thai cave rescue story. In 2020, Willacy and the ABC Investigations-Four Corners Team were awarded the Gold Walkley and the Investigative Journalism Walkley for reporting alleged war crimes in Afghanistan by Australian Special forces and broadcasting helmet camera footage showing the apparent unlawful killing of an unarmed Afghan man. He also won Scoop of the Year at the 2020 NSW Kennedy Awards for the same story.

In 2021, Mark Willacy and Rory Callinan, on behalf of ABC News Online, were awarded a Queensland Clarion Award for Investigative Journalism.

=== Writing ===
In 2007, Willacy wrote his first published book about his experiences covering the conflict in the Middle East, entitled The View From the Valley of Hell, published by Pan Macmillan.

Willacy's second book, Fukushima: Japan's Tsunami and the Inside Story of the Nuclear Meltdowns, on the 2011 Tōhoku earthquake and tsunami disaster, was published in 2013. Fukushima was long-listed for the 2013 Walkley Book Award.

Willacy's third book, Rogue Forces, was published by Simon and Schuster in August 2021. The book describes alleged Australian Special Forces war crimes in Afghanistan, self-described as an insider account of alleged unlawful killings and cover-ups by SAS patrols. It was published shortly after the official Brereton Report in 2020 which investigated these and other allegations made against Australian forces in Afghanistan. Rogue Forces won the 2022 Prime Minister's Literary Award for non-fiction and was longlisted for the inaugural Australian Political Book of the Year in the same year.

=== Complaints and defamation over alleged war crimes ===
In October 2020, Willacy co-authored an ABC Investigations article that alleged in 2012 commandos from 2nd Commando Regiment had killed an Afghan prisoner after a US Marine helicopter crew member told them that there was no room for him on board the helicopter.

Following a complaint, an ABC internal review found that readers could have misinterpreted that November platoon was alleged to have killed the prisoner. The commander of November platoon at the time Heston Russell has said the unlawful killing never happened. The ABC added a clarification to the article as a particular platoon had not been identified by their source. Heston sued for defamation. Willacy denied claims in court that he had been "irresponsible" or had reported on allegations of war crimes he had "failed to corroborate".

On 16 October 2023, Russell was awarded $390,000 in damages for defamation as Justice Michael Lee found in his favour. The judge said the 2021 article "overstated the cogency of the evidence in the ABC's possession" and was published following several "missteps", including the failure to seek a response from the veteran. Justice Lee also noted a motivation for the creation and then urgent publication of the story was an eagerness for Willacy to prove wrong those who, in his terms, had 'come after [him]' and his reporting, and to vindicate Willacy's reporting and ABC Investigations. The defamatory articles were removed from ABC publication.

== See also ==
- ABC News (Australia)
- ABC News 24
- Australian war crimes
