= Killing of Dad Mohammad =

2012 homicide by Australian soldiers

- Part of War crimes in Afghanistan by the Australian Defence Force
- Location: Deh Jawz-e Hasanzai, Uruzgan Province, Afghanistan
- Date: May 2012
- Attack type: War crime
- Victim: Dad Mohammad
- Perpetrator: Special Air Service Regiment
- Accused: Oliver Schulz
- Charges: Murder

Dad Mohammad was an Afghan father-of-two who was shot and killed by Australian soldiers during the war in Afghanistan. Mohammad, who was unarmed, was accosted by a patrol looking for an insurgent bombmaker and mauled by the patrol's dog. The soldiers then forced Mohammad to lie flat on the ground, at which point one of the soldiers, identified as "Soldier C", shot him three times in the head.

The incident was investigated by the Australian Defence Force, who concluded that Mohammad had been killed in self-defence based on false testimony from the soldiers involved. Video footage of the shooting acquired by ABC TV was later broadcast as part of the documentary "Killing Field", leading to a renewed investigation. In March 2023, Australian SAS veteran Oliver Schulz was arrested and charged with murder for his alleged role in the shooting. The case is the first time an Australian soldier has faced charges for war crimes.

== Victim ==
Dad Mohammad was 25 or 26 years old at the time of his death. He was married with two daughters, and suffered from a medical condition that stunted growth in one leg.

== Incident ==
In May 2012, soldiers from 3-Squadron Special Air Service Regiment were dispatched to the Afghan village of Deh Jawz-e Hasanzai in search of a suspected insurgent. Two Black Hawk helicopters that were guiding the ground patrol spotted a suspicious figure in a wheat field ahead of the patrol's position. The patrol scout (referred to in the media as "Soldier C") headed into the field with a dog handler, whose helmet camera recorded the entire incident. The dog handler released a patrol dog named Quake from its leash, and Quake immediately ran into the field.

The soldiers arrived in the field to discover Mohammad lying on the ground. Mohammad, holding what ABC reported were prayer beads, was being mauled by Quake. Quake released Mohammad when called off by the handler. Soldier C then trained his gun on Mohammad, who did not move, and asked the handler if he should "drop this cunt". The handler told Soldier C to ask the patrol commander, who was nearby. Soldier C repeatedly asked the commander the same question; the commander's response is not audible in the recording. Soldier C then shot Mohammad three times from a range of two metres. In total, less than three minutes passed between the soldiers arriving and Mohammad's death.

The shooting was witnessed by an Afghan farmer named Abdul Khaliq. Several months after the incident, local authorities lodged a complaint with the ADF and demanded an investigation. Initially, the review was conducted entirely from reading the written mission reports submitted by 3-Squadron. Investigators only spoke to Soldier C and one other soldier after a senior officer questioned details in the report. The investigators were told that Soldier C fired from 15 metres away, and that Mohammad was "tactically manoeuvring" and had been shot in self-defence. Other soldiers claimed to have recovered a radio and a mobile phone from Mohammad's body, the latter of which connected Mohammad to the insurgent the patrol was searching for. The ADF ultimately concluded that the shooting was lawful, and that Mohammad had posed a direct threat to the soldiers.

== Four Corners documentary ==
External videos
- Killing Field: Explosive new allegations of Australian special forces war crimes | Four Corners

On 16 March 2020, the investigative TV program Four Corners released an episode entitled "Killing Field" which focussed on unlawful killings by Australian forces in Afghanistan. The episode included the helmet cam footage of Mohammad's shooting, which narrator Mark Willacy described as a war crime. As a result of the documentary, the ADF removed Soldier C from active duty.

The release of the footage resulted in public outcry in Australia. Former ADF chief Chris Barrie condemned the shooting as "a simple case of murder". Prime Minister Scott Morrison called the footage "shocking", and defence minister Linda Reynolds referred the case to the Australian Federal Police. The AFP opened an investigation into Mohammad's death, which was later transferred to the Office of the Special Investigator after the release of the Brereton Report.

== Criminal charges ==
On 20 March 2023, former Australian soldier Oliver Schulz was arrested for war crimes. He was remanded in custody and charged with one count of murder as a war crime relating to the killing of Dad Mohammad. It was alleged that Schulz was Soldier C, the man depicted in the video who killed Mohammad, and that the incriminating items found on Mohammad's corpse had been planted after he was killed. Schulz's arrest marked the first time an Australian soldier had been charged with a war crime. Legal scholars described the case as "unprecedented", noting that Australia and its allies had typically avoided holding war crimes trials against their soldiers, especially in civilian courts.

After his arrest, Schulz requested that he be released pending trial due to the possibility that Muslim extremists could harm him while in prison. Magistrate Jennifer Atkinson granted the request and he was released on 28 March. As a condition of his release, Schulz was required to surrender his passport and report to a police station three times a week.

Preliminary hearings in the case against Schulz began on 7 April 2025. Several military witnesses were ordered to testify by the prosecution in order to see what testimony they would give at trial. Among the witnesses who testified was the officer who conducted the initial investigation into Mohammad's death. He stated that Schulz did not describe Mohammad as acting evasively when he was questioned, but a senior officer had required him to include this detail in the report.

Schulz was formally committed for trial on 20 August 2025. However, due to security concerns impeding the court's access to much of the evidence the case is unlikely to be heard until at least 2027. Schulz has pleaded not guilty.

== See also ==
- Ben Roberts-Smith
