= Sarah McNaughton =

Australian prosecutor

The Honourable Justice Sarah McNaughton

Judge of the Supreme Court of New South Wales
- Incumbent
- Assumed office 11 October 2022

8th Commonwealth Director of Public Prosecutions
- In office 16 May 2016 – 2 September 2022
- Preceded by: Robert Bromwich
- Succeeded by: Scott Bruckard PSM (acting‍–‍interim); Raelene Sharp KC

Personal details
- Education: University of Sydney (BA (Hons), LLB (Hons), LLM)
- Occupation: Judge, barrister
- Profession: Lawyer

Sarah McNaughton is an Australian judge and former barrister who has served as a judge of the Supreme Court of New South Wales since 11 October 2022. Prior to her appointment to the judiciary, she served as the Commonwealth Director of Public Prosecutions from 16 May 2016 to 2 September 2022.

== Biography ==
McNaughton studied arts and law at the University of Sydney, and after completing university worked as an Associate to Justice Michael Kirby, at the time President of the New South Wales Court of Appeal and later Justice of the High Court.

After being admitted as a solicitor, McNaughton worked for Freehill, Hollingdale and Page (now Herbert Smith Freehills) until 1990, then moved to the Commonwealth Director of Public Prosecutions where she worked as a senior and later principal legal officer. In 1996, McNaughton joined the New South Wales Bar, initially working in-house at the CDPP but later moved to private practice where she specialised in criminal matters, including large scale complex criminal trials, including for fraud, taxation, corporations, drug importation and terrorism offences. She became Senior Counsel in 2011.

While at the private bar, McNaughton was Counsel for New South Wales in the Royal Commission into Institutional Responses to Child Sexual Abuse, and later Senior Counsel Assisting in the Royal Commission into Trade Union Governance and Corruption.

In May 2016, McNaughton was appointed by then-Attorney-General of Australia, George Brandis as the Commonwealth Director of Public Prosecutions for a five-year term, replacing Robert Bromwich who had been appointed as a Judge of the Federal Court of Australia. She commenced the role on 16 May 2016.

During McNaughton's tenure as Commonwealth Director of Public Prosecutions, the agency managed a number of high-profile matters, including the prosecution of "Witness K" and Bernard Collaery, ADF whistleblower, Major David McBride, and ATO whistleblower, Richard Boyle, and potential prosecutions arising out of the Royal Commission into Misconduct in the Banking, Superannuation and Financial Services Industry,

In September 2022, McNaughton was appointed by New South Wales Attorney-General Mark Speakman as a judge of the Supreme Court of New South Wales. She resigned as Commonwealth Director of Public Prosecutions effective 2 September 2022 to take up the new appointment.

Legal offices
Preceded by Robert Bromwich	Commonwealth Director of Public Prosecutions; 2016–2022	Succeeded by Raelene Sharp
