= Commentary about Julian Assange =

View and reception of Julian Assange

Views on Julian Assange have been given by a number of public figures, including journalists, well-known whistleblowers, activists and world leaders. They range from laudatory statements to calls for his execution. Various journalists and free speech advocates have praised Assange for his work and dedication to free speech. Some former colleagues have criticised his work habits, editorial decisions and personality. After the 2016 US Presidential election, there was debate about his motives and his ties to Russia. After Assange's arrest in 2019, journalists and commentators debated whether Assange was a journalist. Assange has won multiple awards for journalism and publishing.

== Pre-2010 ==
In 1997, Assange created the deniable encryption program Rubberhose as a tool for human rights workers who needed to protect sensitive data in the field. Science-fiction writer Bruce Sterling was impressed with the program and wrote that he thought Assange knew he would attract the attention of the authorities and had "figured out that the cops would beat his password out of him, and he needed some code-based way to finesse his own human frailty".

== 2010 ==
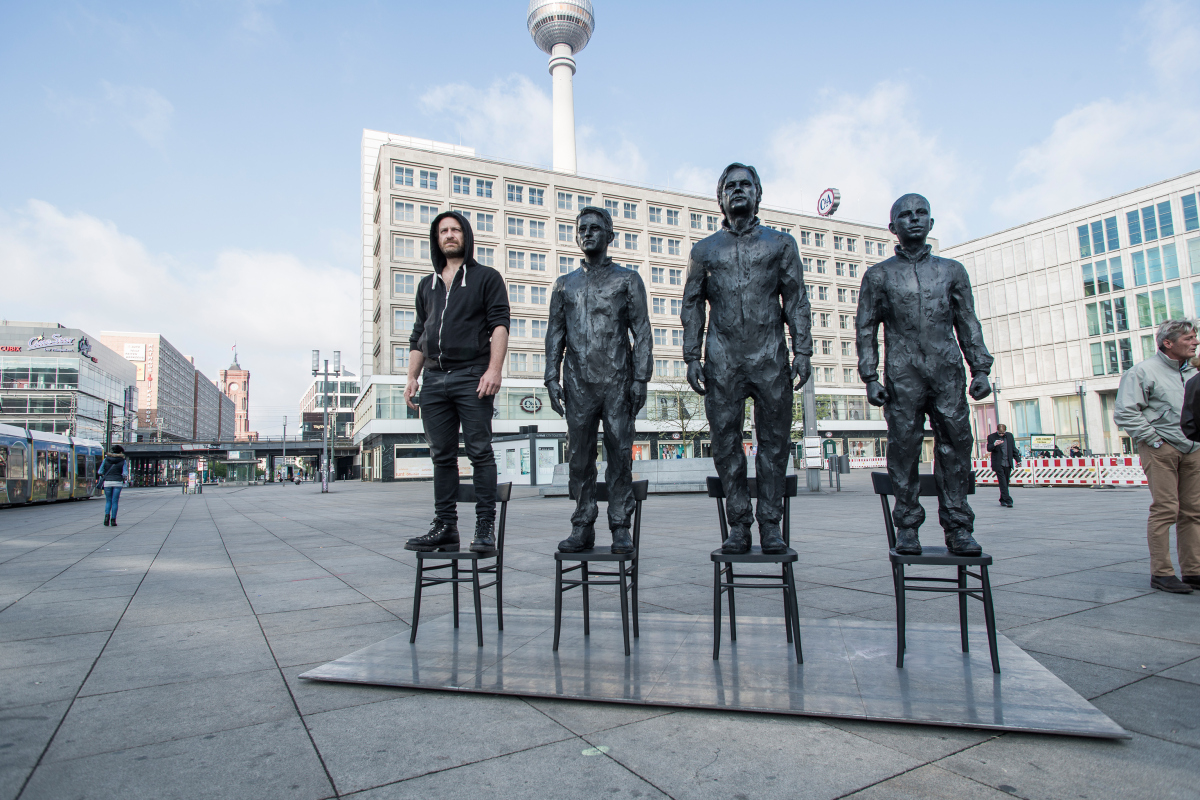
The travelling art installation Anything to Say? by Davide Dormino featuring bronze sculptures of Assange, Snowden, and Manning standing on chairs in Berlin on May Day 2015

In 2010 Pentagon Papers whistleblower Daniel Ellsberg said that Assange was a kindred spirit who disclosed information "on a scale that might really make a difference" and "has shown much better judgment with respect to what he has revealed than the people who kept those items secret inside the government."

During an argument in an internal chat, Domscheit-Berg told Assange he was failing as a leader. After Assange told him he should quit, former WikiLeaks member Herbert Snorrason questioned his judgment. Other departing members who challenged his leadership style included Birgitta Jonsdottir, who acknowledged his importance to the organisation.

In November 2010, an individual from the office of the President of Russia suggested that Assange should be awarded the Nobel Peace Prize. In December 2010 Luiz Inácio Lula da Silva who was then the President of Brazil, said "They have arrested him and I don't hear so much as a single protest for freedom of expression". Vladimir Putin, the prime minister of Russia, asked at a press conference "Why is Mr. Assange in prison? Is this democracy?" In the same month Julia Gillard, Prime Minister of Australia, described his activities as "illegal" but the Australian Federal Police said he had not broken Australian law. Joe Biden, the vice-president of the United States, was asked whether he saw Assange as closer to a high-tech terrorist than to whistleblower Ellsberg. Biden responded that he "would argue it is closer to being a high-tech terrorist than the Pentagon Papers".

American politicians Mitch McConnell, Newt Gingrich, and Sarah Palin each either referred to Assange as "a high-tech terrorist" or suggested that through publishing US diplomatic traffic he was engaged in terrorism. Other American and Canadian politicians and media personalities including Tom Flanagan, and Mike Huckabee called for his assassination or execution.

Journalists at The Guardian, The Daily Beast, and Salon wrote that Assange is not a journalist, while other journalists at Salon wrote that he is. Italian Rolling Stone magazine called Assange "the person who best embodied a rock'n'roll behaviour" during 2010, describing him a cross between a James Bond villain, a Marvel superhero and a character from The Matrix films. It hailed him as "the exterminator of secrets held by the world's great powers".

== 2011–2014 ==
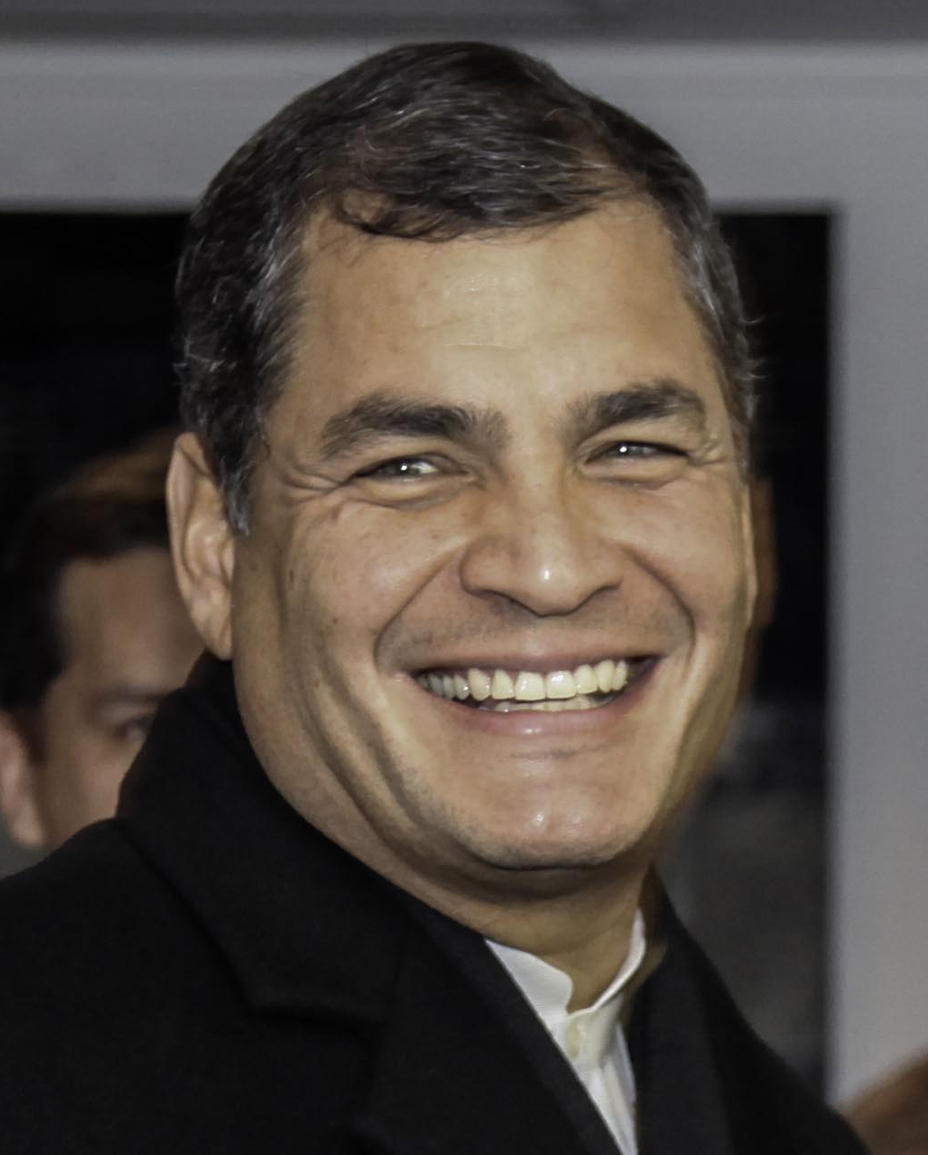
Ecuadorian President Rafael Correa

In his 2011 memoir Inside WikiLeaks: My Time with Julian Assange at the World's Most Dangerous Website, Domscheit-Berg criticised Assange's character, his attitude towards women, and his handling of the "Collateral Murder" video clip. He wrote that Assange had lied to The New Yorker about decrypting the video clip, and had refused to reimburse WikiLeaks' staffers who worked on the project. Domscheit-Berg described Assange as "freethinking", "energetic" and "brilliant" as well as "paranoid", "power-obsessed" and "monomaniacal". In March 2011, Australian author Robert Manne wrote that Assange was "one of the best-known and most-respected human beings on earth". In September 2011, the Guardian, New York Times, El Pais, Der Spiegel, and Le Monde made a joint statement that they condemned and deplored the decision by Julian Assange to publish the unredacted state department cables and WikiLeaks insiders including Birgitta Jonsdottir criticised Assange's handling of the moral issue of the Afghan War Diary and "dictatorial tendencies" inside WikiLeaks. The New York Times reporters "came to think of Assange as smart and well-educated, extremely adept technologically, but arrogant, thin-skinned, conspiratorial and oddly credulous."

Writing in the MIT Technology Review, Jason Pontin predicted in early 2011 that "Assange has declared himself the state’s enemy and he will, in all likelihood, be comprehensively destroyed. Wikileaks will vanish. There will be collateral damage to the press and our civil liberties. But the technology of Wikileaks, once imagined, cannot be forgotten and is easily imitated".

In November 2011 Vaughan Smith, founder of the Frontline Club, said he supported Assange "in terms of the manner in which he is delivering us an opportunity to talk about really important stuff. I think it's important that we are encouraged to discuss secrecy in our society. It's good for us". In July 2012, Smith offered his residence in Norfolk for Assange to continue WikiLeaks' operations while in the UK. Smith told the press it was not about whether Assange was right or wrong for what he had done with WikiLeaks, it was about "standing up to the bully" and "whether our country, in these historic times, really was the tolerant, independent, and open place I had been brought up to believe it was and feel that it needs to be".

In diplomatic cables from 2011 and 2012, Australian diplomats dismissed claims that the US investigation of Assange was politically motivated. The cables also revealed that the embassy saw complaints about threats to Assange as part of a media campaign "to set the scene for a possible political exception to extradition".

In April 2012, interviewed on Assange's television show World Tomorrow, Ecuadorian president Rafael Correa praised WikiLeaks and told his host "Cheer up! Cheer up! Welcome to the club of the persecuted!" That October, Andy Greenberg said The Architect "sees Assange as driven by his ego and there were points when he felt like Assange was not as focused about the release of significant information as he was on breaking records, releasing leaks that were bigger than the last one."

In 2012 Bob Beckel called for Assange's assassination, and in 2013, Michael Grunwald echoed the call, though Grunwald later apologised for this, saying, "It was a dumb tweet. I'm sorry. I deserve the backlash". In April 2013, filmmaker Oliver Stone stated that "Julian Assange did much for free speech and is now being victimised by the abusers of that concept." In 2013, Jemima Khan wrote that when dealing with Assange, "pundits on both the left and the right have become more interested in tribalism than truth. The attacks on him by his many critics in the press have been virulent and highly personal." Vivienne Westwood criticised Khan for ending her support for Assange. Khan wrote:

"As editor-in-chief of WikiLeaks, Assange had created a transparency mechanism to hold governments and corporations to account. I abhor lies and WikiLeaks exposed the most dangerous lies of all – those told to us by our elected governments. WikiLeaks exposed corruption, war crimes, torture and cover-ups. ... If Assange is prosecuted in the US for espionage, I suspect even his most disenchanted former supporters will take to the barricades in his defence. The list of alienated and disaffected allies is long: some say they fell out over redactions, some over broken deals, some over money, some over ownership and control. The roll-call includes Assange's earliest WikiLeaks collaborators, Daniel Domscheit-Berg and "The Architect", the anonymous technical whizz behind much of the WikiLeaks platform. It also features the journalists with whom he worked on the leaked cables.

In early 2014 Andrew O'Hagan, the ghost writer of Assange's autobiography, said that Assange was passionate, funny, lazy, courageous, vain, paranoid, moral, and manipulative. In November 2014, Spanish Podemos party leader Pablo Iglesias also gave his support to Assange, calling him an activist and a journalist and criticising his persecution.

== 2015–2018 ==
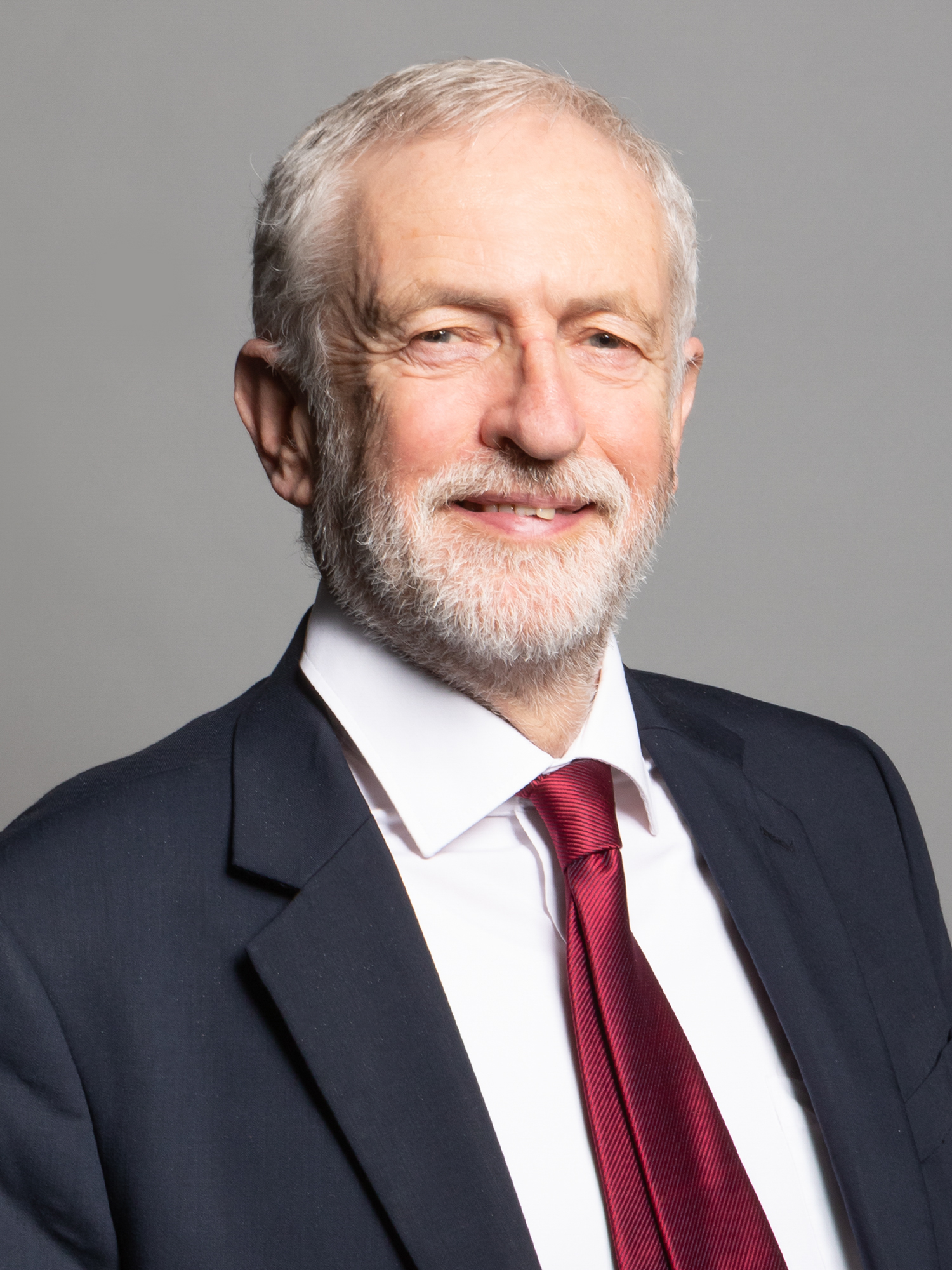
UK MP Jeremy Corbyn

In July 2015 British Member of Parliament Jeremy Corbyn opposed Assange's extradition to the US, and as Labour Party leader in April 2019 said the British government should oppose Assange's extradition to the US "for exposing evidence of atrocities in Iraq and Afghanistan".

In October 2016 James Ball who had previously worked with Assange, wrote that he had a score to settle with Hillary Clinton and wanted to reassert himself on the world stage, but that he wouldn't knowingly have been a tool of the Russian state. That month Pussy Riot member and Courage Foundation advisory board member Nadya Tolokonnikova criticised Assange for his connections to the Russian government.

In 2017 Barrett Brown said that Assange had acted "as a covert political operative" in the 2016 US election, thus betraying WikiLeaks' focus on exposing "corporate and government wrongdoing". He considered the latter to be "an appropriate thing to do", but that "working with an authoritarian would-be leader to deceive the public is indefensible and disgusting". That May, Laura Poitras said he was admirable, brilliant and flawed. In late May 2017, President Moreno said that Assange was a "hacker", but that he respected his human rights and Assange's asylum in the embassy would continue.

== 2019–2023 ==
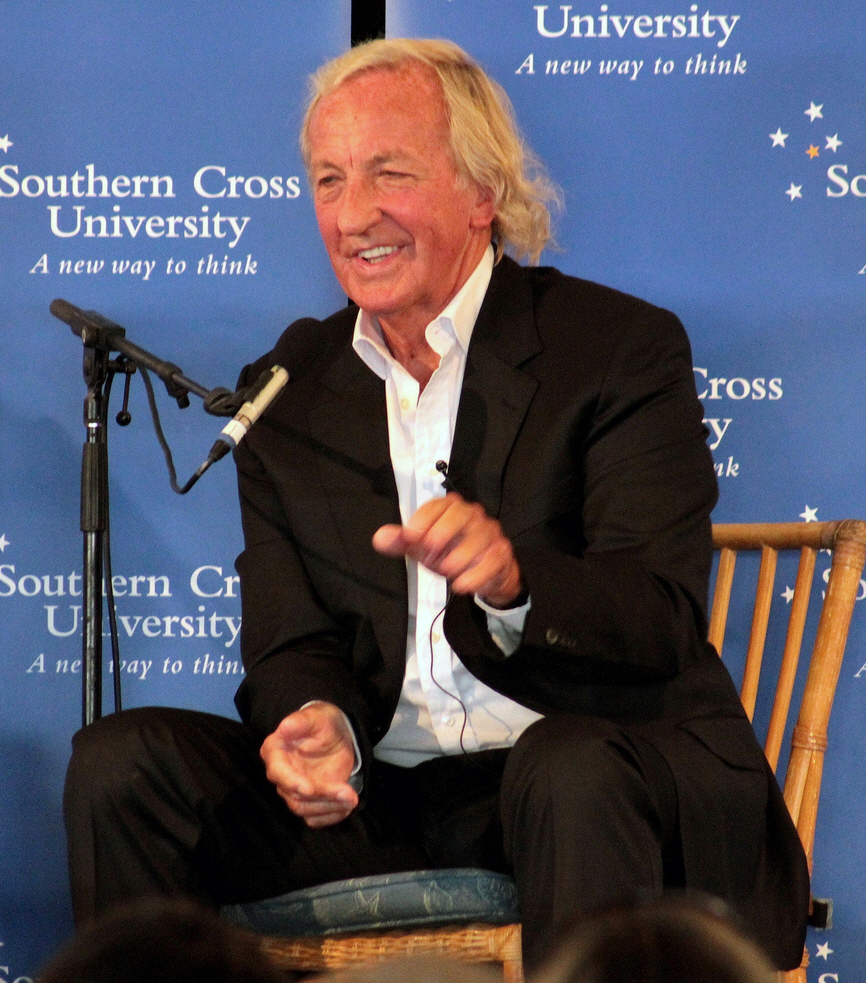
Australian journalist John Pilger

Days before Assange was arrested, the Guardian's editorial board wrote that "it would be wrong to extradite him" and that "He believes in publishing things that should not always be published – this has long been a difficult divide between the Guardian and him. But he has also shone a light on things that should never have been hidden. When he first entered the Ecuadorian embassy he was trying to avoid extradition to Sweden over allegations of rape and molestation. That was wrong. But those cases have now been closed. He still faces the English courts for skipping bail. If he leaves the embassy, and is arrested, he should answer for that, perhaps in ways that might result in deportation to his own country, Australia."

After Assange's arrest in 2019, journalists and commenters debated whether Assange was a journalist. Journalists at the Associated Press, CNN, The Sydney Morning Herald, The LA Times, National Review, The Economist, and The Washington Post argued he was not a journalist. Other journalists at The Independent, The Intercept, the Committee to Protect Journalists, and The Washington Post wrote that he was a journalist or that his actions were still protected. The Washington Post's editorial board wrote that he was "not a free-press hero" or journalist and that he was "overdue for personal accountability."

In December 2019 Australian journalist Mary Kostakidis said that in 2006 she "became fascinated at this young, idealistic Australian, very tech-savvy, who developed a way for whistleblowers to upload data anonymously". In January 2021, Australian journalist John Pilger stated that, were Assange to be extradited, "no journalist who challenges power will be safe". In November 2022, The Guardian, The New York Times, Le Monde, Der Spiegel and El País published an open letter that said "the US government should end its prosecution of Julian Assange for publishing secrets". The letter did not urge the government to drop the case related to the hacking-related charge, though it said that "some of us are concerned" about it, too.

The journal Ethics and Information Technology published a paper by Patrick D. Anderson in 2020, in which he wrote that Assange’s cypherpunk ethics need to be considered when assessing the work of WikiLeaks. Anderson wrote that "By combining cypherpunk ethics with antiwar values and Enlightenment ideals, Assange developed a truly global conception of cypherpunk philosophy. Within this worldview, crypto defends privacy for the weak, thereby upholding the right to communicate, and promotes transparency for the powerful, thereby limiting the harm caused by bad governance".

In his 2022 book The Trial of Julian Assange: a Story of Persecution, former United Nations Special Rapporteur on Torture and Other Cruel, Inhuman or Degrading Treatment or Punishment, Nils Melzer, wrote that Assange's treatment by the United States, Great Britain, Sweden, and Ecuador "exposes a fundamental systemic failure that severely undermines the integrity of our democratic, rule-of-law institutions.".

In 2023 former Trump administration CIA Director Mike Pompeo described Assange in his memoir as "a useful idiot for Russia to exploit." The next month, Louis Menand of New Yorker wrote that "Julian Assange is possibly a criminal. He certainly intervened in the 2016 election, allegedly with Russian help, to damage the candidacy of Hillary Clinton. But top newspaper editors have insisted that what Assange does is protected by the First Amendment, and the Committee to Protect Journalists has protested the charges against him."

While there was support from some American journalism institutions, as well as from bi-partisan politicians, for Assange's arrest and indictment, several non-government organisations for press freedom condemned it and individuals, journalists, and activists have opposed his extradition.

In 2019 The New York Times' Editorial Board warned: "The administration has begun well by charging Mr. Assange with an indisputable crime. But there is always a risk with this administration — one that labels the free press as 'the enemy of the people' — that the prosecution of Mr. Assange could become an assault on the First Amendment and whistle-blowers." Kenneth Roth, executive director of Human Rights Watch, also warned, "The only thing standing between an Assange prosecution and a major threat to global media freedom is Britain." The same year, Reporters Without Borders said that the United Kingdom should refuse to extradite him because it would "set a dangerous precedent for journalists, whistleblowers, and other journalistic sources that the US may wish to pursue in the future."

In March 2020 the International Bar Association's Human Rights Institute, IBAHRI, condemned the mistreatment of Assange in the extradition trial. In September 2020, an open letter in support of Assange was sent to Boris Johnson with the signatures of the Presidents of Argentina and Venezuela and approximately 160 other politicians. The following month, U.S. Representatives Tulsi Gabbard and Thomas Massie introduced a bipartisan resolution opposing the extradition of Assange. In December 2020, German human rights commissioner Bärbel Kofler cautioned the UK about the need to consider Assange's physical and mental health before deciding whether to extradite him, and the UN special rapporteur on torture Nils Melzer appealed to British authorities to immediately release Assange after 10 years of arbitrary detention.

In an auction of non-fungible tokens on 9 February 2022 organised by Pak collaborating with Assange, an NFT artwork called "Clock" by him was bought by a decentralised autonomous organisation ("DAO") of over 10,000 supporters called AssangeDAO and raised 16,593 of the cryptocurrency ether, worth about $52.8m at the time, for Assange's legal defence. "Clock" updates each day to show how long Assange has been imprisoned.

== 2024–present ==
In 2024 The Guardian stated that they opposed the extradition of Assange for "the sake of his freedom – and ours", saying that it was "an iniquitous threat to journalism, with global implications". Simon Crowther, a representative of Amnesty International believes that if Assange is extradited to the U.S., "Journalists the world over are going to have to watch their back." There have been large political rallies in London, Rome, Brussels and Berlin opposing his extradition. German chancellor Olaf Scholz commented on 4 March, while Assange's appeal was under consideration by the High Court, that "it would be good if the British courts granted him the necessary protection".

Prior to Assange's final appeal against extradition to the United States, Alice Jill Edwards, the United Nations Special Rapporteur on Torture and Other Cruel, Inhuman or Degrading Treatment or Punishment, urged the UK to stop his extradition because of concerns he would be subject to torture if extradited.

According to Charlie Savage of The New York Times, Assange's plea deal marked the first time the US had convicted a nongovernmental official with publishing secret documents. He and press freedom organisations warned that this could set a journalistic precedent for press freedom. Jameel Jaffer, executive director of the Knight First Amendment Institute at Columbia University, said that the plea deal "would avert the worst-case scenario for press freedom, but this deal contemplates that Assange will have served five years in prison for activities that journalists engage in every day. It will cast a long shadow over the most important kinds of journalism, not just in this country but around the world."

Former senior Australian diplomat and international relations expert Ian Kemish described the consular assistance provided by Australia as being of a magnitude hard to compare to any previous case, even though the extraordinary consular assistance was slow to eventuate across multiple successive Australian governments.

== Honours and awards ==
Assange has been awarded multiple awards for journalism and publishing including the Amnesty International UK Media Award, Economist Award, Martha Gellhorn Prize for Journalism, and more.
