= Roger Wilkins (public servant) =

Australian public servant

Roger Wilkins AO
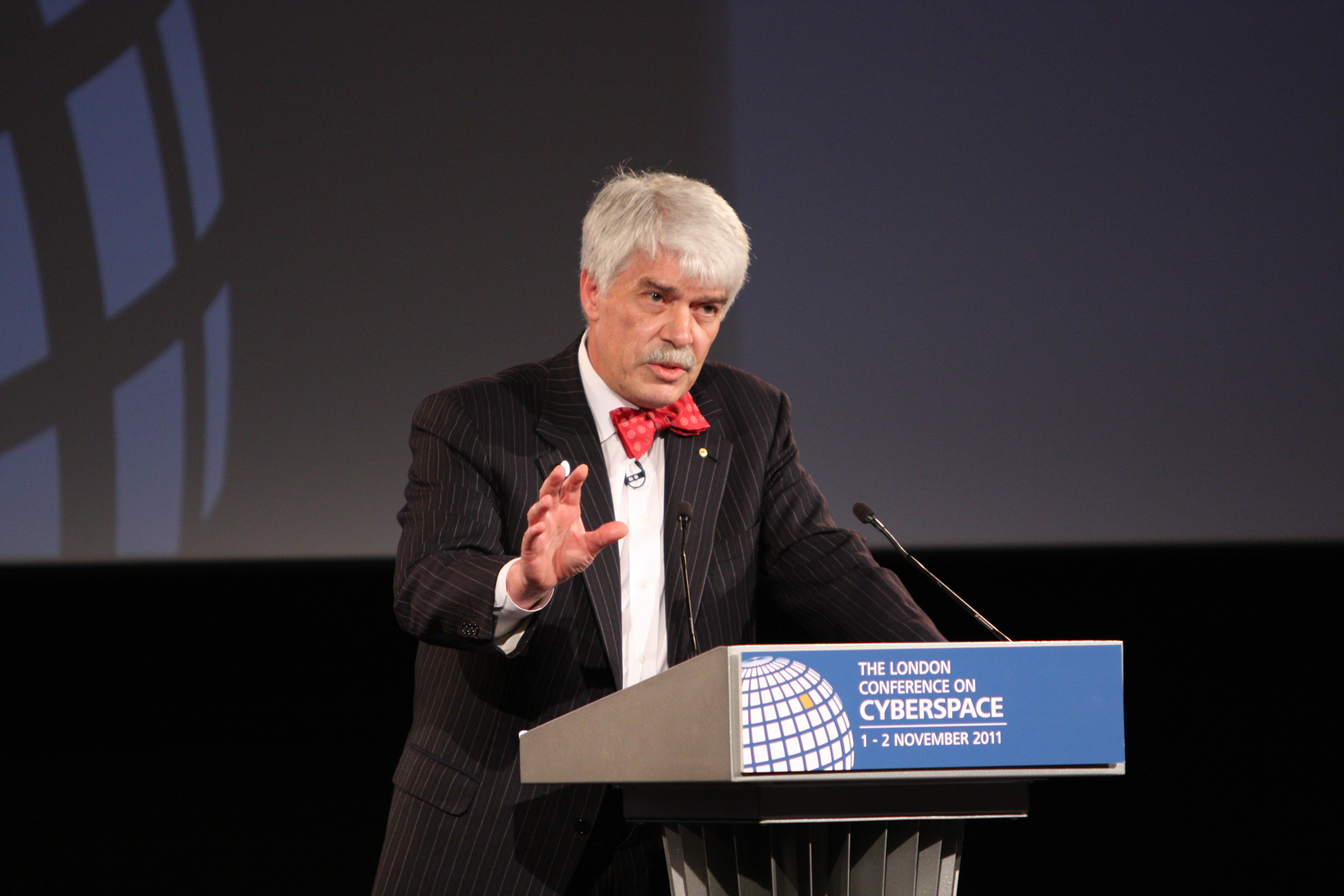
- Wilkins in London, 2011

Secretary of the Attorney-General's Department
- In office 1 September 2008 – 31 August 2014

Personal details
- Born: Roger Bruce Wilkins
- Education: University of Sydney
- Occupation: Public servant

Roger Bruce Wilkins AO is a former senior Australian public servant. He was Secretary of the Attorney-General's Department between September 2008 and August 2014.

== Life and career ==
Roger Wilkins was born in the early 1950s.

Between 1992 and 2006, Wilkins was Director-General of the New South Wales Cabinet Office. In that role, he led reform in administration, law and corporatization, as well as microeconomic reform. Between 2001 and 2006, he was also simultaneously Director-General of the New South Wales Ministry of the Arts.

Between 2006 and 2008, Wilkins was head of Australia and New Zealand government relations for the global financial services company Citigroup, leading the organisation's climate change program in the role.

In 2008, Wilkins was appointed Secretary of the Attorney-General's Department.

Wilkins was appointed President of the Financial Action Task Force in July 2014, while still head of the Attorney-General's Department.

Wilkins retired from the Australian Public Service in August 2014, but remained in his role as president of the Financial Action Task Force.

== Awards ==
Wilkins was made an Officer of the Order of Australia in June 2007 for service to public administration in New South Wales, particularly as a contributor to a range of new policy initiatives, and to arts administration.

Government offices
Preceded by Robert Cornall	Secretary of the Attorney-General's Department; 2008 – 2014	Succeeded by Chris Moraitis
