= Chris Craigie =

Australian district judge

His Honour Judge Christopher Craigie SC

Judge of the District Court of New South Wales
- Incumbent
- Assumed office 15 October 2012

6th Commonwealth Director of Public Prosecutions
- In office 13 October 2007 – 12 October 2012
- Preceded by: Damian Bugg
- Succeeded by: Robert Bromwich

Personal details
- Education: University of New South Wales
- Occupation: Barrister, Judge

Christopher Bruce Craigie SC, also known as Chris Craigie, is a Judge of the District Court of New South Wales and former Commonwealth Director of Public Prosecutions who served in that role between 2007 and 2012.

== Biography ==
Craigie originally studied history, before studying law and becoming one of the first students to graduate in law from the University of New South Wales. He was admitted as a solicitor in 1976 and a barrister in 1980. He was appointed as a public defender in 1994. In 2001 Craigie was appointed Senior Counsel and from 2002–2007 was Deputy Senior Public Defender for NSW.

On 13 October 2007 Craigie was appointed by then-Attorney-General of Australia, Phillip Ruddock as the Commonwealth Director of Public Prosecutions for a seven-year term. Ruddock praised Craigie's extensive career in criminal law and expertise required to supervise Commonwealth criminal prosecutions.

Craigie's time as Commonwealth Director of Public Prosecutions, between 13 October 2007 and 12 October 2012, included the prosecution of complex criminal matters relating to terrorism, money laundering, drug trafficking and people smuggling, and included proceeds of crime litigation against David Hicks and a determination that there was insufficient evidence to prosecute Labor MP Craig Thomson after a three-year investigation by Fair Work Australia.

At the conclusion of his term as Director of Public Prosecutions, Craigie was appointed to the District Court of New South Wales and was sworn in on 15 October 2012.

Legal offices
Preceded by Damian Bugg	Commonwealth Director of Public Prosecutions; 2007–2012	Succeeded by Robert Bromwich
