= Damian Bugg =

Australian lawyer

Damian Bugg AM KC

Chancellor of the University of Tasmania
- In office 1 January 2006 – 31 December 2012
- Preceded by: Michael Vertigan
- Succeeded by: Michael Field

5th Commonwealth Director of Public Prosecutions
- In office 2 August 1999 – 12 October 2007
- Preceded by: Brian Ross Martin
- Succeeded by: Christopher Craigie

Personal details
- Born: Tasmania
- Spouse: Jenny Bugg
- Children: 2
- Education: University of Tasmania
- Occupation: Barrister

Damian John Bugg AM KC (born 11 October 1946) is an Australian barrister who served as the Commonwealth Director of Public Prosecutions between 1999 and 2007. Prior to this appointment, he was the Tasmanian Director of Public Prosecutions from July 1986 to 1999. In 2005, he was appointed a Member of the Order of Australia (AM) for services to the law. He served as Chancellor of the University of Tasmania between 2006 and 2012.

== Biography ==
Bugg was born in Tasmania and attended school and university in Hobart at the University of Tasmania, where he resided at St. John Fisher College, graduating with a Bachelor of Laws in 1969. He was called to the Bar of the Supreme Court of Tasmania in 1969 and worked for the Hobart law firm Simmons Wolfhagen from 1969 to 1970. In 1971 he married Jenny and they travelled to England and Europe for three years. From 1972 to 1973 Bugg worked in the litigation branch of the London law firm Howard Kennedy and Rossi, returning to Tasmania and working as Crown Counsel in the office of the Crown Advocate for Tasmania from 1974 to 1975. He then worked for the Hobart law firm Dobson, Mitchell and Allport from 1976 to 1982 as a lawyer specialising in commercial law and criminal litigation, and as senior litigation partner from 1982 until 1986 when he was appointed as the first Director of Public Prosecutions for Tasmania. He took silk in 1994.

Bugg has served as President of the Bar Association of Tasmania, Chairman of the Legal Assistance Scheme and a Member of the Council of the Law Society of Tasmania. He was a Member of the Council of the Australian Institute of Judicial Administration for nine years and was a board member and then President of the Canadian-based International Society for the Reform of Criminal Law. He established and chaired the Electronic Recording Committee which implemented the program of video recorded Police interviews throughout Tasmania in 1987, the first jurisdiction in Australia to do so, and established and chaired the Forensic Science Services Committee in 1988, has written and spoken about Victims Rights, Pretrial Disclosure, Committals and Procedural Reform.

Bugg served as Tasmania's first Director of Public Prosecutions, from 1986 to 1999, during which time he successfully prosecuted Martin Bryant in 1996 for the murder of 35 people and the attempted murder of 23 others in April 1996. Bryant pleaded guilty before the Chief Justice of the Supreme Court of Tasmania in November 1996. Following sentencing the Case records were sealed for 30 years then in 2025, they were re-sealed for a further 75 years. Port Arthur massacre. As Commonwealth Director of Public Prosecutions between 2 August 1999 to 12 October 2007, Bugg determined in July 2005 that there was insufficient evidence on which to base any prosecution of Steve Vizard, granted indemnities in relation to Schapelle Corby, and decided in 2007 to discontinue prosecuting Dr Muhamed Haneef on alleged offences relating to terrorism. At the expiry of his fixed year term in 2007, Bugg was succeeded by Christopher Craigie, SC.

In 1998 Bugg was appointed as a Fellow of the University of Tasmania; and in September 2001, Bugg was appointed to the Council of the university, and served as Chancellor from 2006 to 2012. Upon his retirement as Chancellor In December 2012, the honorary degree of Doctor of Laws (honoris causa) was conferred on Bugg by the university.

Following the 2013 Tasmanian bushfires, Bugg was appointed as chairman of the Tasmanian Bushfires Recovery Taskforce.

== Personal life ==
Bugg married Jenny in 1971. They have a son and daughter.

In 2003, Bugg was a recipient of the Centenary Medal, and was later appointed a Member of the Order of Australia (AM) for services to the law.

Legal offices
Preceded by Brian Ross Martin	Commonwealth Director of Public Prosecutions; 1999–2007	Succeeded by Christopher Craigie
Academic offices
Preceded by Michael Vertigan	Chancellor of the University of Tasmania; 2006–2012	Succeeded by Michael Field
