= Afghan Files (Australia) =

Australian Defence Force documents

The Afghan Files are a set of Australian Defence Force documents about the operation of Australia's special forces in Afghanistan. The documents were leaked to the Australian Broadcasting Corporation (ABC) by David McBride. Seven news stories, as well as accompanying analysis, were ultimately published as a result. The documents covered a wide range of topics, but notably detailed multiple cases of possible unlawful killings of unarmed men and children. In response to the leak, the Australian Federal Police raided the ABC's offices in June 2019, confiscating all material related to the matter.

The main author of the Afghan Files, ABC investigative journalist Dan Oakes, was later awarded a Medal of the Order of Australia for "service to journalism" regarding his work on the Afghan Files.

== Issues covered ==
=== Problems with organisation culture ===
The documents raised concerns over the “organisational culture” including a “warrior culture”, with particular concern over “desensitisation” and a “drift in values” among elite Special Air Service Regiment (SASR) soldiers serving in Afghanistan. The documents alluded to a deep division between the SASR and the 2nd Commando Regiment - the two elite units that make up the majority of the Australian Army's special forces. The series raised concerns about the SASR's drift away from its traditional reconnaissance role in favour of heavy-handed direct action missions which caused civilian casualties and alienated the local population.

=== Unlawful killings ===
The documents contained at least 10 accounts of possibly unlawful killings of unarmed men and children. Two of the incidents, both occurring in September 2013, were investigated by the Inspector General of the Australian Defence Force. One incident involved the death of a man named Bismillah Azadi and his son Sadiqullah in an Australian raid in Uruzgan Province. According to the Australian soldiers on the raid, Bismillah allegedly pointed a pistol at SASR troopers. Contrary to the soldier's reports, however, Afghan police found Bismillah and Sadiqullah in bed beside each other the next day, apparently killed while asleep.

The documents also contained a report of a detainee alone with a soldier being shot after allegedly trying to seize a weapon. Later in 2013 after these incidents, Australian troops allegedly killed an Afghan motorcyclist, and injured his female passenger. This incident reportedly agitated the Afghan authorities, who threatened to stop working with Australia unless the killing of unarmed civilians ceased.

=== Severed hands incident ===
The files provided insight into an incident in which an SASR soldier severed the hands of an Afghan insurgent for identification confirmation purposes. Preceding the event, the special forces were searching for an Australian National Priority Target codenamed "Objective Rapier", a senior insurgent commander responsible for numerous terrorist attacks. Helicopters and over 120 troops were involved in the search. During a fight in the Zabul Province, four insurgents were killed. An SASR Corporal searched the bodies, and then severed a single hand from each of the insurgents with a scalpel. Troops were required to gather fingerprints and eye scans of every Taliban member killed, if it is possible to do so. Mutilation of the dead, however, is a violation of the laws of war. Captain Andrew Hastie, disturbed by the event, reported the incident up the chain of command. Members of the troop pointed blame at an official training session held just nine days prior, in which two experts allegedly sanctioned the removal of hands.

The SAS soldier responsible for severing the dead insurgent's hands was later cleared of all charges, with the inquiry finding it was not done in a spirit of revenge or barbarity with the intent to mutilate but with the purpose to identify the deceased insurgent.

== Government raid and investigation ==
ABC Ultimo Raid
- Date: 5 June 2019
- Time: 11:32am
- Duration: 8 hours
- Location: 700 Harris Street, Ultimo; 33.8821373°S 151.1973052°E
- Type: Government raid
- Cause: Release of the Afghan Files
- Target: ABC; Gaven Morris; Dan Oakes; Sam Clark
- First reporter: Lorna Knowles

On 5 June 2019, the Australian Federal Police raided the Sydney based headquarters of the ABC over a period of eight hours, reportedly over the Afghan Files. Another agency, likely ASIO, was also present. During the raid, lawyers representing the ABC were forced to interpret the warrant and work with the AFP to ensure privileged information not under the purview of the warrant was not released. The raid was immediately met with wide public criticism, and an FOI request into the incident revealed that the AFP were intentionally targeting journalists, and that prosecution of journalists involved was considered. Following the raid the ABC began litigation against the AFP, claiming the warrant was too broad and thus not enforceable.

In February 2020 the case was dismissed by the federal court, and the AFP began the process of accessing the confiscated files while the ABC rushed to get an injunction.

In June 2020, the AFP sent a brief of evidence to the Commonwealth Director of Public Prosecutions (CDPP), the federal public prosecutor, recommending charges be laid against journalist Dan Oakes for breaking the Afghan Files story. As it was such a high profile case, prosecution also required final approval from the then Attorney General of Australia, Christian Porter. In October 2020, the CDPP announced that, despite believing they would succeed in conviction on several charges, they would not be prosecuting Oakes.

== Senate inquiry ==
The raid on the ABC offices, along with another AFP raid on the home of News Corp journalist Annika Smethurst in the same month, became the subject of a Senate inquiry by the Environment and Communications References Committee on press freedom. The final report, published in May 2021, made 17 recommendations, including proposed reforms to laws that have the potential to criminalise public interest journalism, as well as proposals to improve federal protections for whistleblowers.

== See also ==
- Brereton Report, the report into war crimes allegedly committed by the ADF in Afghanistan between 2005 and 2016.
