= Robert Bromwich =

Australian judge

The Honourable Justice Robert Bromwich SC

Judge of the Federal Court of Australia
- Incumbent
- Assumed office 29 February 2016

Chief Justice of the Supreme Court of Norfolk Island
- Incumbent
- Assumed office 7 May 2024
- Preceded by: Anthony Besanko

7th Commonwealth Director of Public Prosecutions
- In office 17 December 2012 – 28 February 2016
- Preceded by: Chris Craigie
- Succeeded by: Sarah McNaughton

Personal details
- Spouse: Sancia
- Children: 4
- Education: Macquarie University (LLB), University of Sydney (LLM)
- Occupation: Barrister, Judge

Robert James Bromwich is a Judge of the Federal Court of Australia, serving since 29 February 2016. He has also served as the Chief Justice of the Supreme Court of Norfolk Island since May 2024 and as an Additional Judge of the Supreme Court of the Australian Capital Territory since 5 September 2016, and was a part-time Commissioner of the Australian Law Reform Commission from 10 April 2019 to 30 April 2020, sitting on its Inquiry on Corporate Crime.

Prior to being appointed as a judge in 2016, Bromwich was the Commonwealth Director of Public Prosecutions, holding that role from 2012 until 2016.

== Biography ==
Bromwich was born in Darwin where his father was the Chief Surgeon. He moved to Canberra and then Sydney after his schooling and in 1984 completed a Bachelor of Economics and Bachelor of Laws from Macquarie University. He commenced legal work in 1985 as a lawyer in the Commonwealth Director of Public Prosecutions and later became an Assistant Director and trial advocate there. Bromwich's work at the CDPP covered a wide area of federal criminal law, but particularly focused on white-collar crime. He also assisted, while on secondment, in setting up the New South Wales Independent Commission Against Corruption, and obtained a Master of Laws from the University of Sydney in 1993.

In 1998 Bromwich moved to the private bar in New South Wales where he practised in public law, trade practices, industrial and federal criminal law. He was appointed Senior Counsel in 2009.

In December 2012, Bromwich was appointed by then-Attorney-General of Australia, Nicola Roxon as the Commonwealth Director of Public Prosecutions for a five-year term.

Bromwich undertook a number of structural reforms in the CDPP during his term as director, including moving the Office from a regional model to a practice group model with different leaders.

In February 2016, Attorney-General George Brandis appointed Bromwich to the Federal Court of Australia, and he was sworn in as a judge on 29 February 2016.

In April 2019, Attorney-General Christian Porter appointed Bromwich to the Australian Law Reform Commission to help with an ongoing enquiry where Bromwich's role was to consider ways to strengthen the laws regarding the liability of corporate executives.

In August 2024, Bromwich was the presiding judge in the case Tickle vs Giggle.

Legal offices
| Preceded by Chris Craigie | Commonwealth Director of Public Prosecutions; 2012–2016 | Succeeded by Sarah McNaughton |
