= David Adams (photojournalist) =

Australian photojournalist

David Alexander Ian Adams
- Born: 26 June 1963 (age 63); Australia
- Occupations: Photojournalist, documentary film maker

David Alexander Ian Adams (born 26 June 1963) is an Australian photojournalist and documentary film maker.

== Career ==
In 1999, the Discovery Channel commissioned the travel adventure series Journeys to the Ends of the Earth, a thirteen-part documentary series which Adams co-produced and presented.

Since 2002 he has produced and directed a series of documentaries through David Adams Films including White Lions – King of Kings, Flight of the Elephants, The Last Mahout, Land of Fear (in the series Journeys to the Ends of the Earth) and Burma's Open Road.

In 2013, David Adams's six-part series Alexander's Lost World premiered around the world. In the series, Adams journeys to Central Asia to investigate possible sites of cities which historians say were founded by Alexander the Great, including the fabled Alexandria on the Oxus. The series also explores the pre-existing Oxus civilization which existed by the Amu Darya since the Bronze Age.

In 2019, David Adams produced a series of documentaries for the History Channel entitled End of Empire: The Rise and Fall of Dynasties which featured films about Tamerlane, Charlemagne, Attila the Hun and Edgar the Peaceful.

Filmography
Year	Name	Notes	Director	Writer	Producer	Reference
2019	End of Empire (TV Series Documentary)	TV series documentary	Yes	No	Yes	
2019	Turning Point (TV Series Documentary)	TV series documentary	No	No	Yes	
2013	Alexander's Lost World (TV Mini Series Documentary- 6 episodes)	TV mini series Documentary - 6 episodes	Yes	Yes	Yes	
2008	Flight of the Elephants (TV Movie Documentary)	TV movie documentary	Yes	No	Yes	
2007	The Last Mahout (Documentary)	Documentary	Yes	Yes	Yes	
2008	Burma's Open Road – An Insight Into Myanmar (Documentary)	Documentary	Yes	No	Yes	
2005	White Lions – King of Kings	Documentary	Yes	Yes	Yes	
