= Journeys to the Ends of the Earth =

- Genre: Nature documentary
- Created by: David Adams and Stuart Scowcroft
- Directed by: Hugh Piper
- Presented by: David Adams
- Narrated by: David Adams
- Country of origin: Australia
- Original language: English
- No. of episodes: 13

Production
- Executive producer: Stuart Scowcroft
- Producer: Tim Toni
- Editor: Mark Middis
- Running time: 50 minutes
- Production company: Becker Entertainment

Original release
- Release: 1998 – 2002

Journeys to the Ends of the Earth is a 1999 television series produced by the Discovery Channel. Its two-year production made it the most expensive adventure travel series ever commissioned in Australia. The series was co-created by Stuart Scowcroft with series producer by Tim Toni and co-produced by David Adams. It was nominated for Best Documentary Series by the Australian Logie Awards.

== List of episodes ==
- The Land of Fear (Tenere Desert, Niger)
- People of the Flame (Iran)
- Keepers of the Lost Ark (Ethiopia)
- Swahili Sinbads (Zanzibar and Kenya)
- The Forbidden Zone (Kamchatka)
- The Lost City of Gold (Peru)
- The Last Trail of Butch & Sundance (Bolivia)
- In Search of Jason & the Argonauts (Georgia, Azerbaijan)
- The Lost Buddhas of Afghanistan (Afghanistan)
- The Road to Shangri-La (Pakistan)
- The Mystery of the African Pharaohs (Sudan)
- The Lost World of the Khmer Rouge (Cambodia)
- The Ancient Chariots of Libya (Libya)
