= Raelene Sharp =

Australian artist (born 1957)

- Born: 1957 (age 68–69); Melbourne, Australia
- Known for: Portrait painting
- Awards: Packing Room award (Archibald Prize, 2012); Shirley Hannan Portrait Prize (2006)

Raelene Sharp (born 1957 in Melbourne) is an Australian artist who won the Packing Room award at the Archibald Prize in 2012 with her portrait of actor John Wood titled A Strength of Character. She has also been a finalist seven times in the Shirley Hannan Portrait Prize, winning in 2006 with her self-portrait, A Woman's Lot. She has been a finalist in the Black Swan Portrait Prize three times and the James Farrell Self Portrait Prize. Her commissions have included Michael Robertson AO, Professor Fred Mendelsohn, Dr Deborah Siefert and Professor Ruth Bishop AO.
