= Director of Public Prosecutions (Victoria) =

Victorian Government representative for the prosecution of criminal offences

Agency overview
- Formed: 1983
- Jurisdiction: Victoria (Australia)
- Minister responsible: The Hon Sonya Kilkenny, MP, Attorney-General of Victoria
- Agency executives: Brendan Kissane KC, Director of Public Prosecutions; Diana Piekusis KC, Chief Crown Prosecutor
- Parent agency: Department of Justice and Community Safety
- Website: http://opp.vic.gov.au
- Agency ID: PROV VA 2550

The Victorian Director of Public Prosecutions (DPP) is the person responsible for conducting criminal proceedings for indictable offences on behalf of the Monarch of Australia. The role of the DPP is supported by the Crown Prosecutors' Chambers, led by the Chief Crown Prosecutor, and the Office of Public Prosecutions.

The role of DPP is an appointment made by the Governor of Victoria. Once appointed, they are responsible to the Attorney-General in relation to the exercise of their powers. It is the responsibilities of the DPP to ensure justice, fairness, that prosecutions are conducted in an effective, economic, and efficient manner, and that the prosecution system appropriately considers the concerns of victims of crime. The current DPP, Brendan Kissane KC, was appointed in 2024 after his predecessor, Kerri Judd KC, was made a judge of the Supreme Court of Victoria.

== Crown Prosecutors' Chambers ==
The Crown Prosecutors' Chambers is the chambers of barristers who represent the DPP when appearing before the court. The Crown Prosecutors' Chambers encompasses the Chief Crown Prosecutor (CCP), and Crown Prosecutors.

=== Chief Crown Prosecutor ===
The CCP is appointed by the Governor of Victoria and is entrusted with tasks of instructing Crown Prosecutors at the direction of the DPP, ensuring the effective and economical function of the Crown Prosecutors' Chambers, and when complex cases arise, appears before the court on acting on the DPP's behalf.

The current Chief Crown Prosecutor is Diana Piekusis KC after her predecessor, Brendan Kissane KC, was appointed to the role of DPP. She is the first female in the role.

== Office of Public Prosecutions ==
The Office of Public Prosecutions (OPP) is a legal practice made up of solicitors, social workers, legal support staff, and corporate and executive staff. The main role of the OPP is to work on behalf of the DPP by preparing and conducting cases alongside a barrister from the Crown Prosecutors' Chambers. The OPP is Victoria's largest criminal legal practice.

== See also ==
- Director of Public Prosecutions (Australia)
- Director of Public Prosecutions (New South Wales)
