= Mark Weinberg (judge) =

Australian judge

The Honourable Mark Weinberg AC FAAL KC

Judge of the Court of Appeal, Supreme Court of Victoria
- In office 22 July 2008 – 9 May 2018

Judge of the Federal Court of Australia
- In office 15 July 1998 – 19 July 2008

2d Commonwealth Director of Public Prosecutions
- In office 1988 – December 1991
- Preceded by: Ian Temby
- Succeeded by: Michael Rozenes

Personal details
- Born: Mark Samuel Weinberg; 13 May 1948 (age 78) Trelleborg, Sweden
- Education: Monash University; University of Oxford
- Occupation: Academic, barrister, jurist

Mark Samuel Weinberg AC FAAL KC (born 13 May 1948) is a former judge of the Court of Appeal of the Supreme Court of Victoria, serving from July 2008 to May 2018. He is a former judge of the Federal Court of Australia who served from July 1998 to July 2008.

== Early life ==
Weinberg was born in Trelleborg, Sweden, into a Jewish family of Holocaust survivors. He lived in the United States until the age of 10, when he and his family moved to Melbourne, Australia. He attended Melbourne High School and later graduated with a Bachelor of Arts and Bachelor of Laws (First Class Honours) from Monash University. In 1970, the year he graduated, he was awarded the Supreme Court Prize. In 1972, he received the Vinerian Scholarship as the top graduate of the Bachelor of Civil Law program at the University of Oxford. In 1975 he was called to the Victorian Bar.

== Career ==
From 1984 to 1985, Weinberg served as the dean of the Faculty of Law at the University of Melbourne, having previously held the positions of acting dean and deputy dean.

In 1986, Weinberg was appointed Queen's Counsel. From 1988 until 1991, he served as the Commonwealth Director of Public Prosecutions.

After his appointment to the Federal Court in 1998, Weinberg also held several other roles, including deputy president of the Federal Police Disciplinary Tribunal, non-resident judge of the Supreme Court of Fiji, additional judge of the Supreme Court of the Australian Capital Territory and chief justice of the Supreme Court of Norfolk Island. He resigned from the Federal Court and his other appointments in 2008 to take up office as a judge of the Court of Appeal of the Supreme Court of Victoria.

In 2017, Weinberg was appointed an Officer of the Order of Australia for his distinguished service to the judiciary and to the law, particularly through reforms to criminal law and procedure, to legal education in Victoria and to the administration of justice in Fiji and Norfolk Island. He was promoted to Companion in the 2025 King's Birthday Honours.

== Retirement ==
On 9 May 2018, Weinberg retired from the Court of Appeal of the Supreme Court of Victoria after 10 years of service. He continued to hear cases as a reserve Judge.

In 2018, he presided over the jury trial of Dimitrious Gargasoulas, the perpetrator of the January 2017 Melbourne car attack, which killed six people and injured 27. In February 2019, he sentenced Gargasoulas to life in prison with a non-parole period of 46 years.

In 2019, he was part of the three-member bench of the Court of Appeal that heard the appeal of Cardinal George Pell against convictions for sexual offences. The appeal was dismissed by majority, with Weinberg dissenting. In his dissenting opinion, Weinberg concluded that there was a "significant possibility" that Pell may not have committed the offences, and that there was "a significant body of cogent evidence casting serious doubt upon the complainant's account, both as to credibility and reliability". Subsequently, Pell successfully appealed to the High Court, and the convictions were quashed.

Following the release of the Brereton Report, in December 2020, Weinberg was appointed by Home Affairs Minister Peter Dutton as the Special Investigator to investigate alleged war crimes committed by Australian soldiers in Afghanistan.

Legal offices
Preceded by Ian Temby	Commonwealth Director of Public Prosecutions; 1988–1991	Succeeded by Michael Rozenes
