= Ian Kemish =

Australian diplomat

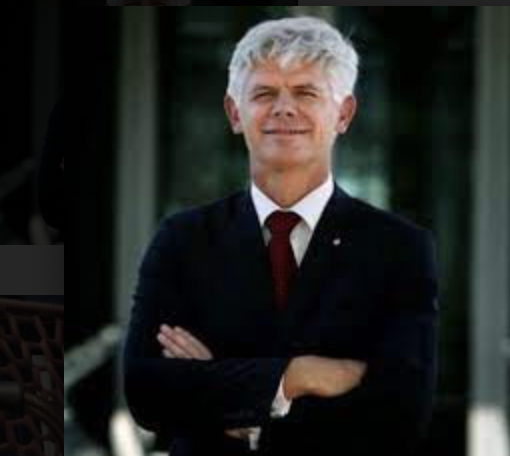
Ian Kemish

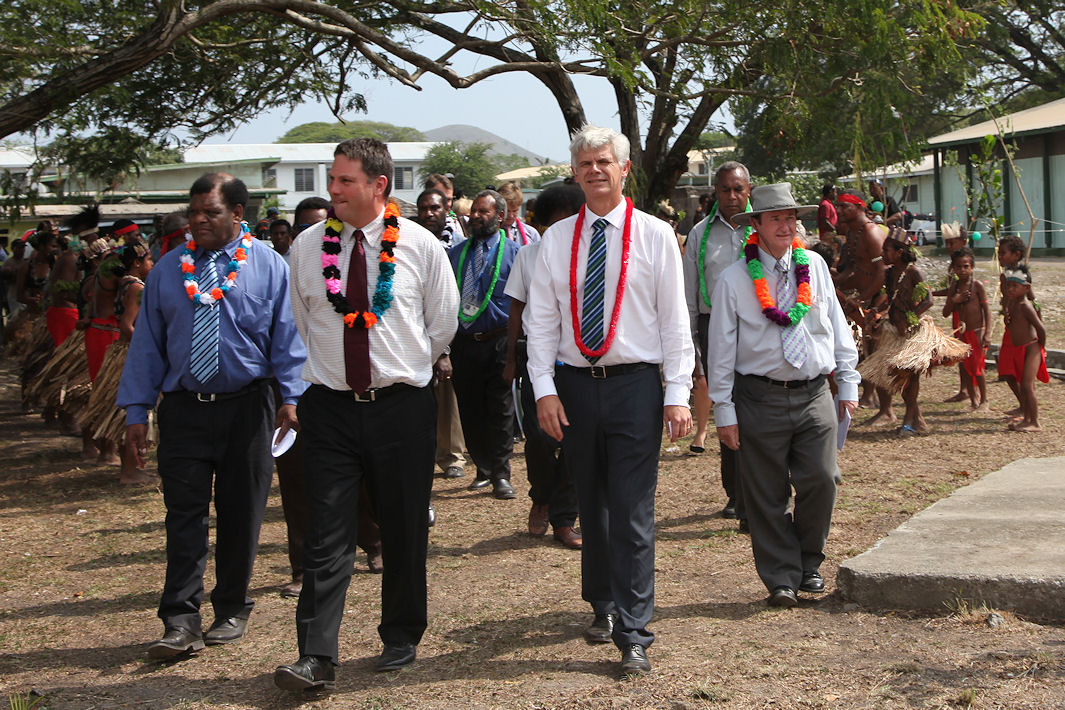

Ian Kemish, AM (born 18 July 1961) is an Australian author, international relations specialist and not-for-profit chair. He is a former senior diplomat and business executive. During his career with the Australian Government he served as Australian High Commissioner to Papua New Guinea, Australian ambassador to Germany, head of the consular and Southeast Asia Divisions of the Department of Foreign Affairs and Trade, and head of the Prime Minister's International Division. As of 2025 he is a non-executive director of Digicel Pacific, co-founder of international strategic advisory firm Forridel, adjunct professor in History at the University of Queensland, a Distinguished Advisor of the Australian National University National Security College, and Industry Fellow at the Griffith Asia Institute.

His book The Consul, released in July 2022, provides an insider account on more than 20 years of international crisis management by the Australian consular service. He is currently working on his debut novel 'Two Islands' under contract with University of Queensland Press, scheduled for publication in March 2026.

== Early life and education ==
Kemish was born in the United Kingdom and grew up in Australia and Papua New Guinea. He attended elementary school in Lae, Rabaul, and then Port Moresby, and secondary school in Darwin and Brisbane, Australia. Kemish graduated with Honours in modern Southeast Asian history from the University of Queensland. He began his career as a secondary school teacher, working with Aboriginal and Torres Strait islanders in Queensland. He speaks Indonesian, German, and Papua New Guinea Tok Pisin.

== Career ==
=== Government ===
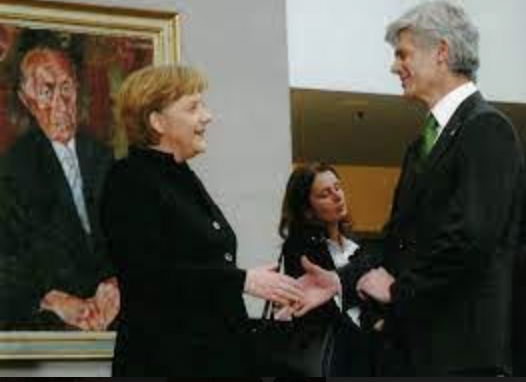
Ian Kemish with former German chancellor Angela Merkel

Kemish's 25-year diplomatic career included service as Head of the Australian Prime Minister's International Division from 2004 to 2005, Australian Ambassador to Germany and Switzerland from 2006 to 2009, and Australian High Commissioner to Papua New Guinea from February 2010 to March 2013.

He served earlier as Head of the Southeast Asia and Consular Divisions at the Australian Department of Foreign Affairs and Trade, and in several other embassies in the Indo Pacific and Europe. Kemish worked as a diplomat in Bosnia and other countries of former Yugoslavia during the conflict of the mid-1990s.

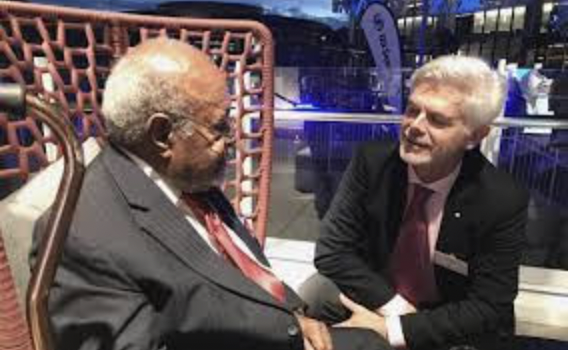
Ian Kemish with former PNG prime minister Michael Somare

Kemish was awarded membership of the Order of Australia for his leadership of Australia's emergency response to the 2002 Bali bombings, in his capacity as head of the Australian consular service and chair of the Inter-Departmental Emergency Task Force. His time as head of the consular service also included the September 11 attacks in the United States and a range of other high-profile crises and individual cases. </ref>

=== Private sector ===
Kemish joined the private sector in 2013, taking on different leadership roles in the internationally focused resource sector, located in Washington and then Melbourne. In March 2020 he retired from the position of Chief People and Sustainability Officer at Newcrest where he had global accountability for sustainability, government and community relations, communications and human resources across Newcrest's jurisdictions in Australia, the Asia Pacific and the Americas. He oversaw Newcrest's adoption of an overarching sustainability framework, greenhouse gas emission reduction targets and new biodiversity protection standards As of 2025, Ian is a non-executive director of Digicel Pacific and a member of the advisory council for the German-Australia Chamber of Industry and Commerce (AHK Australien).

=== Forridel ===
Kemish is a co-founder and director of Forridel, a strategic advisory business which helps a range of private and public sector clients negotiate challenges in the international environment, with a particular focus on the Indo Pacific region.

Kemish is also actively engaged in the international development and not-for-profit sectors. Until 2024 Kemish was a senior adviser to the Global Partnership for Education, where he supported GPE's partnerships with Australia and the Pacific. He is the chair of both the Kokoda Track Foundation, which promotes health, livelihood, education and leadership in PNG, and 3rd Space, which provides services to the homeless in his home city of Brisbane.

=== Academia ===
Kemish is also involved with a number of Australian universities and research institutes. He is an adjunct professor in history at the University of Queensland, where he also chairs UQ's ChangeMakers alumni engagement initiative. He is a Distinguished Advisor at the Australian National University's National Security College, an Industry Fellow at the Griffith Asia Institute, and a director of the Australia-Indonesia Centre at Monash University. He was a visiting fellow at the Lowy Institute of International Affairs from 2016 until 2023.

Kemish writes regularly on Australian foreign policy and consular issues, with a particular focus on developments in the Indo-Pacific and European security .

== Awards and honours ==
Kemish was appointed a Member of the Order of Australia for his leading role in the Australian government's international task force that responded to the 2002 Bali bombings. He was appointed Fellow of the Queensland Academy of Arts and Sciences in 2024.
