= Director of Public Prosecutions (Australia) =

Australian federal prosecutions service

Commonwealth Director of Public Prosecutions

Agency overview
- Formed: 8 March 1984
- Employees: 517
- Minister responsible: Michelle Rowland, Attorney-General of Australia
- Agency executive: Raelene Sharp KC, Director of Public Prosecutions
- Parent department: Attorney General's Department
- Website: cdpp.gov.au

The Office of the Commonwealth Director of Public Prosecutions or, informally, the Commonwealth Director of Public Prosecutions (CDPP) is an independent prosecuting service and government agency within the portfolio of the Attorney-General of Australia, as a part of the Attorney-General's Department. It was established by the Director of Public Prosecutions Act 1983 (Cth) and began its operations in 1984.

== History ==
Founded on 8 March 1984 to prosecute alleged offences against Commonwealth criminal law, primarily the Crimes Act 1914 (Cth) and Criminal Code Act 1995 (Cth), the CDPP was first headed by Director Ian Temby, who remained in that post until 1988. The CDPP commenced with a head office in Canberra, and a Melbourne office was opened on 6 June 1984, assuming responsibility for the work of Special Prosecutor Robert Redlich. The CDPP took over the work of the Special Prosecutors to prosecute bottom of the harbour tax cases and parts of the Attorney-General's Departments Deputy Crown Solicitor's Offices.

The CDPP has been noted for its gender-blind hiring and work practices.

== Function ==
The agency has only one outcome; "Contribute to a fair, safe and just society by delivering an effective, independent prosecution service in accordance with the Prosecution Policy of the Commonwealth". It upholds this function by carrying out prosecutions of crimes against the Commonwealth, and by providing advice to referring agencies.

It has no investigative power or function, and the decision to investigate matters and refer matters to the CDPP is at the discretion of referring agency. Furthermore, the CDPP depends on referring agencies to investigate alleged offences and prepare briefs of evidence to support prosecution and assets recovery.

== Organisation ==
The Commonwealth Director of Public Prosecutions is based in the head office in Canberra and has offices in Adelaide, Brisbane, Cairns, Darwin, Hobart, Melbourne, Perth, Sydney, and Townsville. Most offices include a Fraud and Specialist Agencies branch, a Serious Financial and Corporate Crime branch, a Human Exploitation and Border Protection branch and an Organised Crime and National Security branch.

Although the Commonwealth Director of Public Prosecutions is within the portfolio of the Commonwealth Attorney-General, the Office operates independently of the Attorney-General and of the political process. The Attorney-General, as First Law Officer of Australia, is responsible for the Commonwealth criminal justice system and remains accountable to Parliament for decisions made in the prosecution process, notwithstanding that those decisions are now in fact made by the Director and lawyers of the CDPP. Under section 8 of the Director of Public Prosecutions Act 1983 (Cth), the Attorney-General has power to issue guidelines and directions to the CDPP; however, that can only be done after there has been consultation between the Attorney-General and the Director. Per the Act, any guidelines or directions must be in writing, published in the Gazette, and tabled in Parliament. The CDPP has been directed by the Attorney-General only thrice, none of which were in relation to a specific case.

== List of Commonwealth Directors of Public Prosecutions ==
Order	Director	Term start	Term end	Time in office	Subsequent role	Notes
1	Ian Temby AO, KC	8 March 1984	1988	3–4 years	Inaugural Commissioner of the New South Wales Independent Commission Against Corruption	
2	Mark Weinberg KC	1988	December 1991	2–3 years	Judge of the Federal Court of Australia, later Judge of the Supreme Court of Victoria	
3	Michael Rozenes KC	1 February 1992	1997	4–5 years	Private practice; later Chief Judge of the County Court of Victoria	
4	Brian Ross Martin KC	1997	February 1999	1–2 years	Judge of the Supreme Court of South Australia, later Chief Justice of the Supreme Court of the Northern Territory	
5	Damian Bugg AM, KC	2 August 1999	12 October 2007	8 years, 71 days	Chancellor of the University of Tasmania	
6	Christopher Craigie SC	13 October 2007	14 October 2012	5 years, 1 day	Judge of the District Court of New South Wales	
7	Robert Bromwich SC	17 December 2012	28 February 2016	3 years, 73 days	Judge of the Federal Court of Australia	
8	Sarah McNaughton SC	16 May 2016	2 September 2022	6 years, 109 days	Appointed Judge of the Supreme Court of New South Wales (effective October 2022)	
9	Raelene Sharp KC	4 December 2023				

== See also ==
- Director of Public Prosecutions (New South Wales)
- Director of Public Prosecutions (Victoria)
