= Brereton Report =

Australian war crimes investigation and report

Inspector-General of the Australian Defence Force Afghanistan Inquiry Report into alleged Australian war crimes
- Location: Afghanistan
- Date: 2005-2016 (period investigated); 2009-2013 (killings); 2016-2020 (investigation and report)
- Deaths: 39+
- Victims: Afghan civilians and POWs
- Accused: 25 Australian Defence Force personnel
- Website: afghanistaninquiry.defence.gov.au

The Inspector-General of the Australian Defence Force Afghanistan Inquiry Report, commonly known as the Brereton Report (after the investigation head), is a report into war crimes allegedly committed by the Australian Defence Force (ADF) during the War in Afghanistan between 2005 and 2016. The investigation was led by Paul Brereton, who is both a New South Wales Supreme Court judge and a major general in the army reserve. The independent commission was initiated by the Inspector-General of the Australian Defence Force in 2016, and after a long investigation, delivered its final report on 6 November 2020. The redacted version was released publicly on 19 November 2020.

The report found evidence of 39 murders of civilians and prisoners by (or at the instruction of) members of the Australian special forces, which were subsequently covered up by ADF personnel. The report stated 25 ADF personnel were involved in the killings, including those who were "accessories" to the incident. Some of those believed to be involved were still serving with the ADF. The unlawful killings discussed by the report began in 2009, with most occurring in 2012 and 2013.

== Report ==
The report is divided into three parts. Part one provides background and context of the inquiry, including its genesis. Part two makes up the main body of the report, and examines in detail 57 incidents and issues of note, and makes recommendations in regards to each of them. Part three discusses systemic issues that may have contributed to the environment in which the kind of conduct detailed in the report could take place. The entirety of part two is redacted, and Brereton recommends it "ought not be publicly released, at least until [criminal] proceedings are finalised". Glenn Kolomeitz, a former army officer and lawyer, explained to ABC News that redactions might be intended to avoid prejudice in future criminal investigations and prosecutions, to avoid contaminating those investigations with information obtained from witnesses compelled to cooperate, and to not expose gruesome information that could traumatise or enrage the public.

Although the details were redacted in the public version of the report, it described a 2012 incident as "possibly the most disgraceful episode in Australia's military history" and noted that "the commanders at troop, squadron and task group level bear moral command responsibility" for those events. In July 2021, the Sydney Morning Herald reported that this statement in the report was a reference to allegations that a team of special forces soldiers killed multiple prisoners and civilians over several months.

The 39 murders do not appear to include additional alleged killings previously described off the record to Dr Samantha Crompvoets, a sociologist working for the army. (Note: For example, two 14-year-old boys, thought to be Taliban sympathisers by SAS soldiers, were described in the January 2016 report as having had their throats slit before their bodies were bagged and thrown into a river.)

== Findings ==
=== Throwdowns ===
The report found evidence of the practice of "throwdowns", where Australian troops would carry weapons and equipment not issued by the ADF for the purposes of planting on civilians killed in combat. The weapons were then used in photographic and other evidence to give the illusion that the civilians were legitimate combatants. The report speculates that throwdowns started for the "less egregious though still dishonest" purpose of avoiding scrutiny when legitimate combatants were later found to not be armed, but later evolved into the concealment of intentional unlawful murders.

=== Blooding ===
The inquiry found that junior soldiers were often required by their superiors to murder prisoners to get their first kill, a practice known as "blooding". Brereton described the practice as such: "Typically, the patrol commander would take a person under control and the junior member [...] would then be directed to kill the person under control". Throwdowns were then placed and a cover story created to conceal the practice. The killing of passive prisoners of war is a war crime.

=== Responsibility ===
The report discusses at length the parties responsible for the criminal acts alleged, concluding that while senior commanders "must bear some responsibility", "it was at the patrol commander level that the criminal behaviour was conceived, committed, continued, and concealed, and overwhelmingly at that level that responsibility resides." The patrol commanders were corporals and sergeants, and the inquiry "found no evidence that there was knowledge of, or reckless indifference to, the commission of war crimes" on the part of commanding officers from the troop/platoon level upward.

== Response ==
The release of the report garnered national headlines, international attention and responses from victims and activists. In response to the report, 2 Squadron, Special Air Service Regiment, was disbanded (with a new squadron to be raised at a later date), and the Morrison government established a new Office of the Special Investigator to investigate further criminal conduct and recommend prosecution of individuals involved. In December 2020, Home Affairs Minister Peter Dutton appointed a former Judge of the Supreme Court of Victoria, Mark Weinberg, as the Special Investigator.

The Australian Defence Minister Linda Reynolds felt "physically ill" after reading the report.

The Chief of the Defence Force, General Angus Campbell, apologised for "any wrongdoing by Australian soldiers" and decried a "distorted culture" that undermined the moral authority of the Australian Defence Force. General Campbell also explained that he and the Chief of Army (Lieutenant General Rick Burr) would take further action with respect to the commanders of units potentially involved in war crimes.

Supporters of military whistleblower David McBride stated in general terms that he "provided the public with the first insights into matters now exposed by Justice Brereton", and called for the dismissal of charges against McBride. General Campbell declined to comment on whether the charges should be abandoned.

Neil James, the executive director of the Australia Defence Association, stated that "Australian soldiers have committed war crimes in previous wars but they've been in isolation and haven't been systemic. This clearly is far more serious than anything the ADF has had in its history".

In November 2020, the house of a former Army intelligence officer who had provided the Brereton inquiry and Australian Federal Police with evidence of unlawful killings by the SASR was attacked and damaged. She and her family were relocated by the ADF later that day. The New South Wales Police Force was unable to identify who carried out the attack, and apologised to the victim for bungling the investigation.

The Department of Defence released a plan to respond to the findings of the Brereton Report on 30 July 2021. The plan states that Defence will implement reforms over the period to the end of 2025.

In November 2021, the conversation reported on some of the difficulties of investigating and prosecuting war criminals for the alleged crimes in the Brereton Report. Chris Moraitis told a Senate Estimates committee that it may take 1–5 years before evidence can be presented to the Director of Public Prosections and prosecutions can begin.

In October 2022, it was reported that the trial of whistleblower David McBride would go ahead. McBride had tried to apply for protection under Australia's whistleblower laws; however, this required the testimony of 2 expert witnesses. The Government moved to block the witnesses testifying on "national security" grounds, so McBride withdrew his application and the trial would go ahead. McBride subsequently pleaded guilty and on 14 May 2024 was sentenced to five years and eight months in prison.

In 2023, the former Australian SAS soldier Oliver Schulz was arrested and charged with the killing of Dad Mohammad. He is the first person to be charged in connection with the report. He is also the first Australian soldier to ever be charged under Australian law with a war crime.

=== International ===
The director of the Afghanistan Human Rights and Democracy Organisation, Hadi Marifat, said he had so far been in contact with about seven of the victims' families in Uruzgan province and believed there are other incidents that took place involving Australian soldiers in Uruzgan that were not investigated as part of the inquiry, and "without the participation of the victims, this investigation will be incomplete ... the victims and their families will provide first-hand information and evidence that has not been considered so far by the Australian Inspector-General". He called for "the victims' families to be involved in the investigation and in any legal proceedings, whether that take place in Afghanistan or abroad", and that "compensation has to be comprehensive, including restorative justice and rehabilitation to the victims' families".

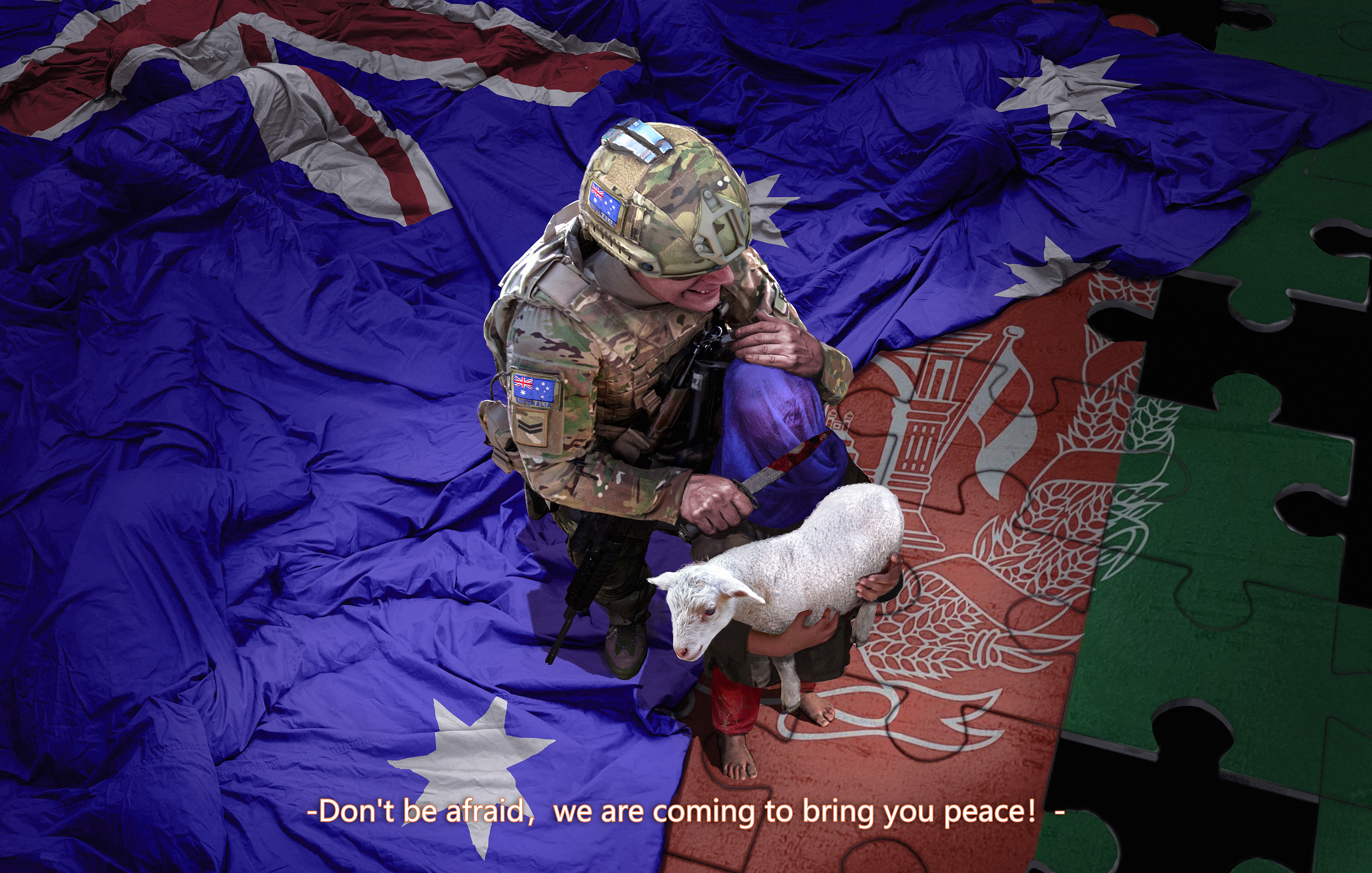
Artist Wuheqilin's computer graphics work shared by Zhao Lijian, titled Peace Force (和平之师)

The response image by artist Wuheqilin, titled To Morrison (致莫里森)

Zhao Lijian, a spokesman for the Foreign Ministry of China and a vocal provocateur on Twitter, share-posted a computer graphics painting created by a Chinese internet political cartoonist, pennamed Wuheqilin, depicting an Australian soldier holding a bloodstained knife to a child's throat, on top of an Australian flag. This image was accompanied by the English caption: "Don't be afraid, we are coming to bring you peace!" This triggered the response from the Australian Government and MPs from various parties condemning Zhao's remarks as "repugnant", "deeply offensive" and "utterly outrageous", with Australian Prime Minister Scott Morrison publicly demanding that the Chinese Government apologise, and appealing to Twitter to directly remove the "falsified image", but has yet to receive any response from Twitter. The Chinese Government has rebuffed Morrison's calls for apology, defending Zhao's conduct and stating that Australia should apologise for the loss of lives in Afghanistan. Zhao, in response, pinned the controversial post to the top of his Twitter timeline. The cartoonist Wuheqilin also followed up with a new image captioned "Apologize!" depicting Morrison and the Australian media mobbing a young painter while being oblivious to the backdrop of dead bodies (which Morrison is trying to conceal with an Australian flag) and soldiers shooting more unarmed civilians.

These diplomatic scuffles compounded against the backdrop of rising tensions in Australia–China relations. Former 2GB broadcaster and conservative "shock jock" commentator Alan Jones wrote an opinion piece on The Daily Telegraph criticizing Scott Morrison for "talking about our troops in a way that gave Beijing an odious line of attack", and former prime minister Tony Abbott also wrote an opinion piece calling "it's time to muscle up against China". Western Australian MP and the current Chair of the Parliamentary Joint Committee on Intelligence and Security, Andrew Hastie, himself a former SASR captain and an outspoken anti-CCP figure, criticized the release timing of the 2016 Crompvoets report ahead of the Brereton Report as detailing "unproven rumours" and "has undermined public confidence in the process and allowed the People’s Republic of China to malign our troops", and described Zhao's tweet as "a repugnant slur" and "calculated, deliberate and designed to undermine the political and social cohesion of our country ... enabled by Silicon Valley social media oligarchs". This was following Hastie's statements from a week prior that he was "grieved by the findings" and "feel great shame" by the "warrior ethos" that was "about power, ego and self-adulation ... worshipped war itself ... the opposite of the humility that I expected to find at SASR" and admitted to have knowledge of similar incidents when he served SASR in Afghanistan, but he disagreed with the Federal handling of the cases because "we can't ventilate everything in public... can't spill all our secrets into the open", and suggested "we can do so ... behind closed doors in a protected classified space" by establishing a joint standing committee.

In response to the tensions between China and Australia, the New Zealand and French Governments joined Australia in criticising the Chinese Government for Zhao's Twitter post. New Zealand Prime Minister Jacinda Ardern described the post as "un-factual" while the French government described the tweet as "unworthy of diplomatic methods" and an "insult to all countries whose armed forces had been engaged in Afghanistan". Ardern's comment was immediately rebuffed during a daily press conference by Hua Chunying, the director of the Chinese Foreign Ministry Information Department, who questioned "Can it be that New Zealand agrees with or even supports Australia's deeds?" This prompted Ardern to step back the tone in the following days and state that New Zealand has not taken sides.

The Russian Foreign Ministry spokesperson Maria Zakharova stated that "the circumstances make us truly doubt the genuine capacity of Australian authorities to actually hold accountable all the servicemen who are guilty of such crimes" and "it makes us reassess the true meaning of the official line pronounced by Canberra to protect the rules-based world order". In response, Australian Strategic Policy Institute executive director Peter Jennings called the latest comments from the Russian Government the "height of hypocrisy" and "to hear these comments from the Russian Foreign Ministry just tells me the height of hypocrisy that the Russians are prepared to go to in their sustained attack on the Western democracies".

== See also ==
- Afghan Files (Australia)
- Military history of Australia during the War in Afghanistan
- Defence Honours and Awards scandal
