= David McBride (whistleblower) =

Australian whistleblower (born 1963)

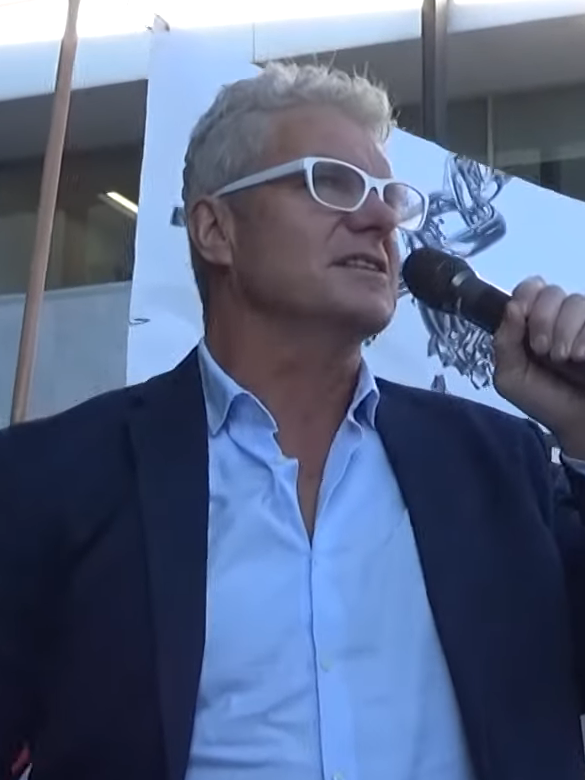
- McBride in 2024
- Born: David William McBride; 15 December 1963 (age 62); Sydney, New South Wales, Australia
- Citizenship: Australian
- Education: Royal Military Academy Sandhurst; University of Oxford; University of Sydney (LLB)
- Height: 188 cm (6 ft 2 in)
- Political party: Liberal (2001/02–2003); Labor (1990s–2001)
- Criminal charges: Theft and Sharing Classified Documents With Press
- Criminal penalty: 5 years 8 months incarceration (non-parole period of two years and three months)
- Criminal status: Released on Parole from Alexander Maconochie Centre, Canberra
- Spouse: Sarah Green (until 2016)
- Parents: William McBride (father); Patricia McBride (née Glover) (mother)
- Military career
- Allegiance: United Kingdom; Australia
- Branch: British Army; Australian Army
- Service years: 1980s–1990s 2002/03–2017
- Unit: Blues and Royals (Note: With the British Army)
- Conflicts: Operation Banner; War in Afghanistan (Note: With the Australian Army)

David William McBride (born 15 December 1963) is an Australian whistleblower, former British Army major, and Australian Army lawyer. In 2016, McBride provided the Australian Broadcasting Corporation with documents that contained information about war crimes committed by Australian soldiers in Afghanistan.

In 2018, McBride was charged with several offences related to unlawfully disclosing Commonwealth documents. In 2023, he pleaded guilty to the charges. On 14 May 2024, McBride was sentenced to five years and eight months in prison, with a non-parole period of two years and three months.

McBride was released from prison in August 2026 on parole granted by attorney-general Michelle Rowland. He will continue his sentence under supervision and conditions.

== Early life ==
McBride was born in 1963 to William McBride, an obstetrician in Sydney, and Patricia McBride (née Glover), also a doctor. He has two sisters, Catherine and Louise, and one brother, John.

He graduated in law at the Sydney University and then obtained a scholarship to take a second degree in the same subject at Oxford University.

== Career ==
McBride joined the British Army and served in Germany before training at the Royal Military Academy Sandhurst and then commanding a Blues and Royals platoon in Northern Ireland. He left the army after failing to complete the entry requirements for the Special Air Service.

After a period in civilian life, including security work in Rwanda and Zaire, a stint as a "tracker" on the 1990s British reality-style television game show, Wanted, as security adviser to the series Journeys to the Ends of the Earth, and an unsuccessful 2003 attempt to win a New South Wales Legislative Assembly seat representing Coogee, for the Liberal Party, he enlisted in the Australian Army as a lawyer.

McBride twice deployed to Afghanistan, in 2011 and 2013. He was medically discharged with post-traumatic stress disorder in 2017.

In 2023, McBride published his memoir The Nature of Honour.

== Leak of military documents ==
In 2016, McBride leaked classified military documents to the Australian Broadcasting Corporation (ABC). McBride had previously raised concerns within the Australian Defence Force about the dangers of increasingly restrictive rules of engagement and the nature of investigations into some members of the special forces over others, arguing that the current rules of engagement were "simple and understood", but "needed to be applied". The ABC found evidence of war crimes and published the information in their 2017 publication The Afghan Files. McBride was allegedly unhappy with ABC's reporting of his documents.

In September 2018, McBride was arrested at Sydney Airport and charged with the theft of Commonwealth property contrary to s 131(1) of the Criminal Code Act 1995; in March 2019 he was charged with a further four offences: three of breaching s 73A(1) of the Defence Act 1903; and another of "unlawfully disclosing a Commonwealth document contrary to s 70(1) of the Crimes Act 1914". McBride pleaded not guilty to each of the charges at a 30 May 2019 preliminary hearing. His legal team included Nick Xenophon and Mark Davis.

In October 2022, it was reported that the case against McBride would proceed to trial. McBride and his lawyers had tried to get the prosecution dropped by applying for protection under Australia's whistleblower laws. This application relied on expert testimony of two witnesses. However, the Australian Government moved to prevent his testimony from being heard on national security grounds. Consequently McBride and his team dropped the application to stop the trial saying "there was little prospect of success without their evidence".

During the case, McBride's lawyers stated he acted out of concern about the nature of the Defence Force's "excessive investigation of soldiers" in Afghanistan. McBride believed the investigations were a "PR exercise" to compensate for earlier public allegations of war crimes. Justice David Mossop stated "the way you've explained it is that the higher-ups might have been acting illegally by investigating these people too much, and that that was the source of the illegality that was being exposed." The prosecution voiced concerns about military personnel being "able to act by reference to something as nebulous as the public interest".

McBride pleaded guilty on 17 November 2023. The plea came after Justice Mossop ruled that he would instruct the incoming jury that McBride was not bound to act in the public interest under his oath of service. The government were also allowed to claim public-interest immunity for documents McBride's defence team sought to use. No appeal was allowed for either decision, and on 14 May 2024, McBride was sentenced to five years and eight months in prison. McBride was released from prison following the direction of attorney-general Michelle Rowland to grant him parole, his sentence will continue under supervision and conditions.

McBride’s prosecution and jailing has been described as exposing a tension between national security and international justice because official secrecy prevented the transmission of information about alleged war crimes into the public domain.

== Personal life ==
McBride has two daughters from a former marriage, to Sarah (née Green). The couple separated in 2016.

A portrait of McBride, titled The Whistleblower, by Kate Stevens won the 2023 Portia Geach Memorial Award.

In 2023, Crikey named McBride their Person of the Year.

== See also ==
- Bernard Collaery – Australian politician and lawyer (born 1944)
- Whistleblower protection in Australia
