= Pistol Grip (painting) =

Painting by Michael Zavros

- Artist: Michael Zavros
- Year: 2014
- Medium: Oil on canvas
- Dimensions: 160 cm × 220 cm (63 in × 87 in)
- Location: Australian War Memorial, Canberra
- Website: awm.gov.au

Pistol Grip, also referred to as Pistol Grip (Ben Roberts-Smith VC), is a 2014 oil on canvas painting by Australian artist Michael Zavros. The painting depicts Ben Roberts-Smith, an awardee of the Victoria Cross for Australia, in camouflage uniform demonstrating holding and aiming a pistol. The work is one of two portraits of Roberts-Smith by Zavros commissioned by the Australian War Memorial.

Roberts-Smith was awarded the Victoria Cross in 2010 during the War in Afghanistan, becoming a national hero. The Australian War Memorial subsequently placed a strong focus on Roberts-Smith and his story, including commissioning Pistol Grip for its collection.

A later defamation trial in the Federal Court of Australia found Roberts-Smith, on the balance of probabilities, committed war crimes during his service. As a result, Pistol Grip, along with other items related to Roberts-Smith, became a point of contention regarding the role of museums and the meaning and purpose of war art.

== Background ==
Born and raised in Western Australia, Roberts-Smith joined the Australian Army in 1996 when he was eighteen. In 2003 he was posted to the Western Australian-based Special Air Service Regiment (SASR). During his time with the SASR, Roberts-Smith deployed to Afghanistan on six occasions. In 2006 he was awarded the Medal for Gallantry for his actions as a patrol scout and sniper.

Roberts-Smith was awarded the Victoria Cross for Australia in 2011 for his actions during Operation Slipper, the Australian contribution to the War in Afghanistan. The citation for his Victoria Cross states Roberts-Smith initiated an assault on an enemy fortification. During the assault, Roberts-Smith "knowingly and willingly exposed his position in order to draw fire" and later "with total disregard for his own safety ... stormed two enemy machine gun positions killing both machine gun teams."

In Brendan Nelson's term as Director, the Australian War Memorial "invested heavily in extolling Roberts-Smith as a hero". This included the display of his uniform worn in Afghanistan and the commissioning of the two portraits, including Pistol Grip.

In 2017, allegations arose claiming SASR personnel in Afghanistan committed of murder and other war crimes. The Inspector General of the Australian Defence Force commissioned an inquiry into the allegation. The subsequent report—commonly known as the Brereton Report—found evidence of multiple unlawful killings by Australian Defence Force personnel between 2009 and 2013.

In 2018, Australian journalists Nick McKenzie, Chris Masters and David Wroe named Roberts-Smith as one of the persons alleged to have committed war crimes in Afghanistan. Roberts-Smith responded by suing the journalists, and the publisher Fairfax Media, for defamation. In 2023, the Federal Court of Australia in Roberts-Smith v Fairfax Media Publications Pty Limited dismissed Robert-Smith's case. Justice Anthony Besanko ruled on the balance of probabilities Roberts-Smith had engaged in unlawful killing and "broke the moral and legal rules of military engagement and is therefore a criminal".

== Composition ==
Pistol Grip is a photorealist portrait of Roberts-Smith, revealing detail of freckles, wrinkles and hairs. The work was painted using a layered technique starting with brown and white and then "building the work up with colour". Zavros depicts Roberts-Smith demonstrating the action of holding a pistol; an "aggressive pose" and representative of the skills he "was trained – and venerated – for doing".

Roberts-Smith personally selected Zavros, an artist who does not normally take on commissions, to paint his portrait from a shortlist of artists. The painting was based on studio sitting and photographs. For Pistol Grip, Zavros asked Roberts-Smith to pose in a fighting stance.

He went to this whole other mode. He was suddenly this other creature and I immediately saw all these other things. It showed me what he is capable of ... it was just there in this flash.

— Michael Zavros

Roberts-Smith considered the painting represented him as an ordinary soldier in extraordinary circumstances. "I'm just another guy; I'm not better than anybody else. I don't know why things happen the way they do."

== Revision ==
Following Roberts-Smith's unsuccessful defamation case the fate of this painting, and other artefacts in the Australian War Memorial collection related to him, came under scrutiny. The fate of the work was seen as "touch[ing] on a far bigger question of how national institutions for the public memory of war address difficult and morally ambiguous moments in a national story".

The Memorial assists in remembering, interpreting and understanding Australia's experience of war and its enduring impact. This includes the causes, conduct and consequences of war. The Memorial acknowledges the gravity of the decision in the Ben Roberts-Smith VC MG defamation case and its broader impact on all involved in the Australian community ... We are considering carefully the additional content and context to be included in these displays.

— Kim Beazley, chair of the Australian War Memorial

Senator David Shoebridge called for the removal of some of these items from the collection "to begin telling the entire truth of Australia's involvement in that brutal war." Zavros believes the work should remain on exhibition, noting he "never think[s] art should ever be removed." Instead, he supports the Australian War Memorial adding contextual information over time, as the work is now a "history painting".

I did my job is as an artist, and I saw something, I painted it and I think those paintings have been speaking to us for 10 years [...] I never try to control the reading of my works. So much of what I do is quite open-ended. I don't like to preach to my audience. I'm not drawn to art that does that.

— Michael Zavros

In September 2023, the Australian War Memorial took two portraits of Roberts-Smith, including Pistol Grip, off display during a $500 million redevelopment. The portrait has not returned to public display.

== Critical reception ==
Kit Messham-Muir, Professor in Art at Curtin University, describes Pistol Grip as a "complex work"; one that shows "how we create the nation through the stories we tell ourselves, and how dynamic that narrative can be."

Rex Butler and Paris Lettau—the latter a former fellow at the Australian War Memorial— unfavourably compared Zavros' work to Marcus Wills' Corporal Cameron Stewart Baird VC MG, another portrait of a Victoria Cross winner (Cameron Baird) commissioned by the Australian War Memorial – "the unwitting and defensive subject of unknown forces around him". By contrast, Butler and Lettau describe Zavros' painting sarcastically as a "[masterpiece] of sorts ... outstanding [example] of our ideological end times and the emptying out of all moral, political, and artistic values".

It's threatening, over-bearing, macho, hypermasculine, celebratory, and enormous, like the man himself—some 220 centimetres wide and 160 centimetres high.

— Rex Butler and Paris Lettau

== Provenance ==
The painting was commissioned directly by the Australian War Memorial in Canberra and remains part of its collection.
