= Crossing the Line (McKenzie book) =

2023 non-fiction book by Nick McKenzie

- Book cover
- Author: Nick McKenzie
- Language: English
- Subject: Ben Roberts-Smith war crimes allegations and defamation trial
- Publisher: Hachette Australia
- Publication date: 2023
- Publication place: Australia
- Media type: Print (paperback), e-book
- Pages: 480
- ISBN: 978-0-7336-5043-7

Crossing the Line is a 2023 non-fiction book by Australian investigative journalist Nick McKenzie. The book was published by Hachette Australia. It recounts McKenzie's investigation, carried out with fellow journalist Chris Masters, into war crimes allegations against Victoria Cross for Australia recipient Ben Roberts-Smith, and the defamation trial that followed.

The book is structured in three parts. It traces the allegations against Roberts-Smith from their origins to the defamation trial, and also describes the personal toll of the reporting and litigation on McKenzie. Reviewers praised it as a work of investigative journalism, although one noted a factual error. Crossing the Line won the BAD Sydney Danger Award for Best True Crime in 2024 and was shortlisted for the Walkley Book Award, the Australian Political Book of the Year and the ABIA General Non-Fiction Book of the Year.

== Background ==
Ben Roberts-Smith was awarded the Medal for Gallantry in 2006 and the Victoria Cross for Australia in 2011. Masters wrote that after he left the army, he came to embody "the myth of the classic Anzac". Despite his public reputation, rumours circulated around possible crimes committed by Roberts-Smith, including bullying and assaulting other soldiers, assaulting unarmed Afghans, and killing an unarmed Afghan.

In June 2018, a joint ABC and Fairfax Media investigation detailed an assault on the Afghanistan village of Darwan in September 2012 during which a handcuffed man was kicked off a cliff by an Australian special forces soldier nicknamed "Leonidas" after the famed Spartan king. Roberts-Smith was identified in later reporting as the soldier previously referred to as "Leonidas". On 6 July 2018, Fairfax Media reported that he was "one of a small number of soldiers subject to investigation by an inquiry looking into the actions of Australian special forces soldiers in Afghanistan". The next month, Fairfax Media reported that Roberts-Smith bullied several of his fellow soldiers and alleged that he had assaulted a woman he was having an affair with.

Roberts-Smith denied the allegations and commenced defamation proceedings in the Federal Court against Fairfax Media and two Fairfax journalists, McKenzie and Masters, as well as a former Fairfax journalist, David Wroe. On 1 June 2023, Justice Anthony Besanko dismissed the defamation case brought by Roberts-Smith. Besanko found that the defence had established substantial or contextual truth of many of their allegations.

McKenzie and Masters each published an account of their investigation and the trial in 2023. McKenzie’s Crossing the Line was published by Hachette Australia on 28 June and Masters’s Flawed Hero followed from Allen & Unwin on 10 July.

== Synopsis ==
Structured in three parts and told largely in chronological order, the book traces the origin of the allegations against the Special Air Service Regiment (SASR) to a report commissioned by the Australian Defence Force after the 2014 Lindt Café siege. The report, Special Operations Command (SOCOMD) Culture and Interactions: Insights and Reflections, was written by consultant Samantha Crompvoets to assess options for greater military involvement in domestic counterterrorism. McKenzie recounts how these allegations reached Chris Masters and then himself, and how the pair sought out named and pseudonymous soldiers and other witnesses prepared to describe alleged murders of prisoners and civilians in Afghanistan. He traces the story's shift from the newsroom to the Federal Court of Australia. Chapter subtitles are dated to help readers follow the timeline, although McKenzie notes the sequence is not always strictly chronological.

The book also covers the personal toll of the reporting and litigation on McKenzie, including his anxiety through the trial. In an author's note, he states that the account draws on the perspectives of the SASR soldiers alleging war crimes and from Roberts-Smith himself.

Alongside the central narrative, the book profiles individual soldiers, including a sergeant given the pseudonym Boyd Keary, whose conduct in Afghanistan is framed against the Anzac tradition of soldierly honour, and Liberal MP and former SAS soldier Andrew Hastie, portrayed as reconciling the demands of combat with a personal code of ethics.

== Reception ==
Writing in The Guardian, journalist Ben Doherty described the book as a "tour de force" and called it a "vital reminder of the power of journalism". Pat Sheil and Monash University's head of journalism Johan Lidberg used their respective pieces in The Sydney Morning Herald and Crikey to describe the book as a "testament to tenacious journalism" and a "testament to tenacious journalism". Pat Sheil and Monash University's head of journalism Johan Lidberg used their respective pieces in The Sydney Morning Herald and Crikey to describe the book as "the forensic dismantling of a legend" and a "testament to tenacious journalism". In her review, Bridget Brooklyn from the University of Western Sydney wrote that the book "delivers a coherent and absorbing account of this shocking story" and that it is "a story that, after all the media coverage that made it so familiar, is one worth telling and worth reading". Writing in The Conversation, Andrea Carson from La Trobe University, writes that "McKenzie artfully uses literary devices. She highlighted McKenzie's usage of first and third person narratives, to weave together multiple threads", moving through his investigation, the courtroom drama, and his own experience of anxiety through the process.

Writing for The Australian, author Tom Gilling praises the book as a "riveting account". However, Gilling notes that it was written and published against the clock so that McKenzie could beat Masters's own account, Flawed Hero, to market and that this shows at times. Gilling points out a factual error regarding the gap between Queen Victoria creating the Victoria Cross and Queen Elizabeth I's earlier appointment of Francis Bacon as the first Queen's Counsel. Gilling also states that an otherwise exciting story could have done without repeating the same line six times in one chapter.

== Awards and nominations ==
Year	Award	Result
2023	Walkley Book Award	Shortlisted
2023	Australian Political Book of the Year	Shortlisted
2024	ABIA General Non-Fiction Book of the Year	Shortlisted
2024	BAD Sydney Danger Award for Best True Crime	Won

== See also ==
- Roberts-Smith v Fairfax Media Publications Pty Limited
