= Flawed Hero =

2023 non-fiction book by Chris Masters

Flawed Hero: Truth, Lies and War Crimes
- Book cover
- Author: Chris Masters
- Language: English
- Publisher: Allen & Unwin
- Publication date: 2023
- Media type: Book
- Pages: 592
- Awards: 2024 Australian Political Book of the Year Award
- ISBN: 978-1-761-06981-9

Flawed Hero: Truth, Lies and War Crimes is a 2023 non-fiction book by Australian investigative journalist Chris Masters, published by Allen & Unwin. The book details allegations that Ben Roberts-Smith committed war crimes, and a subsequent defamation action undertaken by Roberts-Smith against Masters and others. Roberts-Smith's case was dismissed by Justice Anthony Besanko in June 2023.

Reviewers described the book as a compelling retelling of the trial and a revealing account of investigative journalism and legal process. It won the 2024 Australian Political Book of the Year Award. In September 2025, the council of the Australian War Memorial overruled a committee's selection of the book for a literary prize.

== Synopsis ==
Flawed Hero tells the story of Roberts-Smith, one of Australia's most highly decorated soldiers. He was awarded the Medal for Gallantry in 2006 and the Victoria Cross in 2011. After he left the army, he came to embody "the myth of the classic Anzac". Despite his public reputation, however, rumours circulated around possible crimes committed by Roberts-Smith, including bullying and assaulting other soldiers, assaulting unarmed Afghans, and killing an unarmed Afghan.

In 2018, The Sydney Morning Herald, The Age, and The Canberra Times published a series of articles by Masters, Nick McKenzie, and David Wroe outlining the alleged war crimes. Roberts-Smith, with the backing of media mogul Kerry Stokes, launched civil proceedings against the newspapers and journalists. The respondents mounted a defence of substantial truth. Hearings ran from June 2021 to July 2022, complicated by the COVID-19 pandemic, the Taliban's return to power in Afghanistan, and national security sensitivities around some of the evidence.

Justice Besanko dismissed Roberts-Smith's case in June 2023; the plaintiff and defendants spent approximately $25 million each in legal fees. Masters's book has three main sections. The first section deals with various SAS soldiers leaking information about Roberts-Smith's alleged war crimes, the second details legal manoeuvring in the lead-up to the court case, and the final section outlines the evidence given by witnesses.

== Critical reception ==
In Newtown Review of Books, Braham Dabscheck, a Senior Fellow at the Melbourne Law School, writes that the book is a revealing account of investigative journalism, legal process, and culture of the Australian SAS, centred on one soldier's moral failings in Afghanistan. The Saturday Paper stated that the book does not dwell on Roberts-Smith's celebrity nor go into the consequences for Afghanistan, instead providing "a step-by-step account of reporters taking on the legal system, the political establishment and much of the Australian media". The Sydney Morning Herald writes that the book is a "compelling retelling of the Ben Roberts-Smith defamation trial" and that "for those who believe unquestioningly in the ANZAC spirit, this book offers an important corrective – hero worship must not be blind".

== Awards ==
- 2024 Australian Political Book of the Year – Winner
- 2024 Victorian Premier's Literary Awards, non-fiction – Shortlisted
- 2024 NSW Premier's History Awards, Anzac Memorial Trustees' Military History Prize – Shortlisted

=== Australian War Memorial prize ===
In 2025, A committee of the Australian War Memorial selected the book for the Les Carlyon Literary Prize. The $10,000 prize was originally for an author's first book or major publication. In 2022, the judging panel broadened eligibility to include established authors. In September 2025, the council of the memorial subsequently overruled the selection, stating that the committee had not followed a recently adopted criterion that the work be the first major publication of an emerging author, thus disqualifying the book. The memorial deferred awarding the 2024 prize. The retrospective change in criteria was criticised by Masters; however, Prime Minister Anthony Albanese supported the decision. Council chair Kim Beazley denied that the rules had been changed retrospectively and said the decision was not related to the book's subject matter.
