= Ben Roberts-Smith =

Australian former soldier (born 1978)

Ben Roberts-Smith VC MG
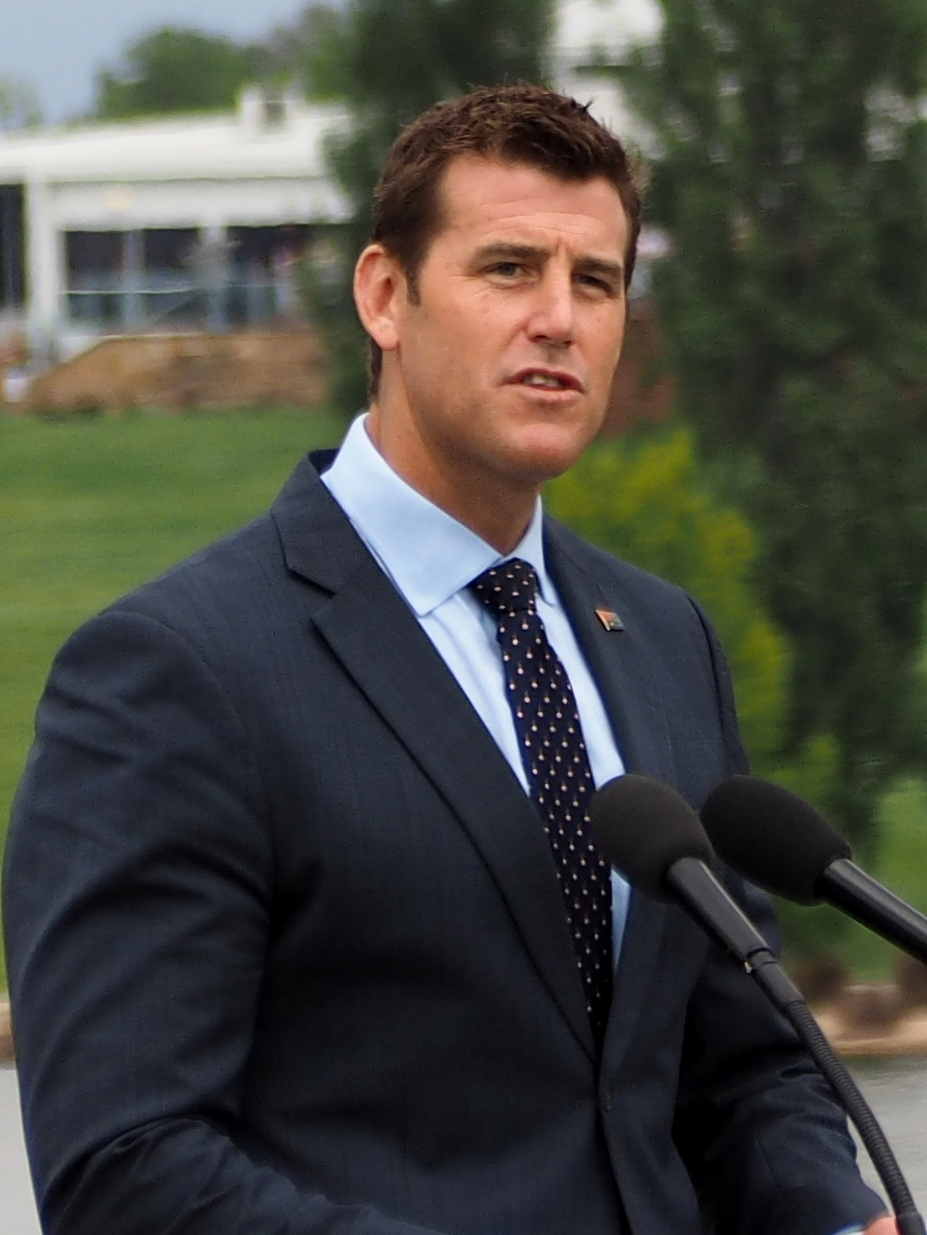
- Roberts-Smith in 2015
- Born: 1 November 1978 (age 48); Perth, Western Australia, Australia
- Spouse: Emma Groom (m. 2003; div. 2020)
- Relatives: Len Roberts-Smith (father); Sam Roberts-Smith (brother)
- Military career
- Allegiance: Australia
- Branch: Australian Army (1996–2013); Australian Army Reserve (2013–2015)
- Service years: 1996–2015
- Rank: Corporal
- Units: 3rd Battalion, Royal Australian Regiment (1997–2003); Special Air Service Regiment (2003–2013)
- Conflicts: International Force East Timor; War in Afghanistan; Iraq War
- Awards: Victoria Cross for Australia; Medal for Gallantry; Commendation for Distinguished Service
- Other work: Chairman of the National Australia Day Council (2014–2017); General manager of Seven Queensland (2015–2023)

Benjamin Roberts-Smith (born 1 November 1978) is an Australian former soldier in the Special Air Service Regiment (SASR). He is one of Australia's most highly decorated soldiers, having received the Medal for Gallantry (2006), the Victoria Cross for Australia (2011)—the highest award for gallantry in battle that can be awarded to a member of the Australian Defence Force (ADF)—and a Commendation for Distinguished Service (2012). He was considered a national hero, but his reputation deteriorated following a 2023 Federal Court ruling in which a judge found that there was enough evidence, according to the standard required in Australian defamation law, to establish that he had murdered four unarmed Afghans and broken the rules of military engagement.

After his discharge in 2013, Roberts-Smith was named Australian Father of the Year, was awarded a scholarship to study business at the University of Queensland and received many other honours. He was appointed by media mogul Kerry Stokes to top executive positions at Seven Queensland and ultimately Seven Brisbane, from which he stepped down in 2021 to focus on his defamation action against Nine Entertainment.

In October 2017, Roberts-Smith's conduct in Afghanistan came under scrutiny after reports emerged that he had killed an unarmed teenager and bullied other soldiers. He commenced defamation proceedings in 2018; however, in June 2023, Justice Anthony Besanko dismissed the case, writing that he had "disgraced his country". In 2025, appeals to the Federal Court of Australia and the High Court of Australia were dismissed and refused in full.

In April 2026, Roberts-Smith was arrested and charged with five counts of the war crime of murder. He was released on bail later that month. The matter is currently before the courts.

== Early life, family and education ==
Benjamin Roberts-Smith was born on 1 November 1978 in Perth, Western Australia. He is the elder son of Sue (nee Holloway) and Len Roberts-Smith. His father is a former justice of the Supreme Court of Western Australia, Army Reserve major general and Judge Advocate General of the Australian Defence Force. His brother, Sam, is an opera singer.

In his biography of Roberts-Smith, Crossing the Line, journalist Nick McKenzie alleges that Roberts-Smith developed a reputation for intimidating smaller students at school. He struggled academically, achieving average grades at Perth's Hale School. During his time at Hale, he played both rugby and basketball for the school. In 1995, his final year, the school's first XV rugby team recognised him as its best and fairest player.

== Military career ==
=== Early career ===
Roberts-Smith enlisted in the Australian Army in 1996 at age eighteen. After completing his training at the School of Infantry in Singleton, New South Wales, Roberts-Smith was posted to the 3rd Battalion, Royal Australian Regiment (3 RAR) in 1997. Initially a rifleman in C Company, he subsequently became a section commander in the Direct Fire Support Weapons Platoon. With 3 RAR and as a part of Rifle Company Butterworth, Roberts-Smith was deployed twice in Malaysia and participated in two operations in East Timor in 1999, including as part of the International Force East Timor. By 2001, following his service in Malaysia and East Timor, he held the rank of corporal.

After completing the Special Air Service Regiment (SASR) selection course in 2003 and the SASR reinforcement cycle, Roberts-Smith was posted to 3 Squadron, SASR at Campbell Barracks in Perth. Joining SASR meant surrendering his rank of corporal and starting at the base rank of trooper. While in 3 Squadron, he was a member of training and assistance teams throughout Southeast Asia. He took part in operations off Fiji in 2004 and was part of personnel security detachments in Iraq throughout 2005 and 2006.

=== Afghanistan ===
Roberts-Smith was deployed to Afghanistan on six occasions, in 2006, 2007, 2009, 2010 and 2012, as part of Australia's contribution to the War in Afghanistan (2001–2021). His deployments were with the SASR, which conducted long-range covert intelligence, reconnaissance and strike operations, often behind enemy lines. The regiment's operations have been characterised as secretive.

==== Medal for Gallantry ====
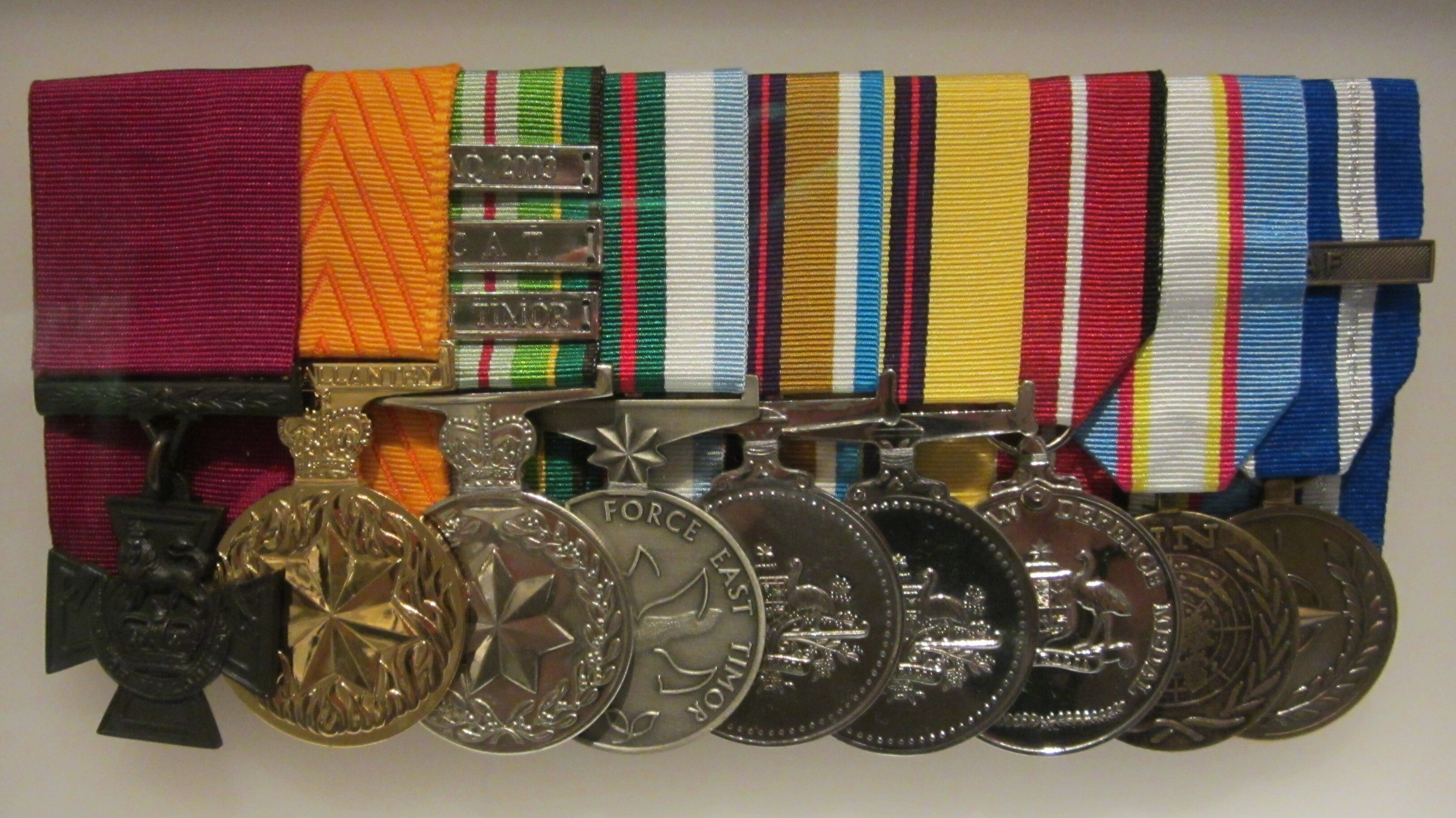
Roberts-Smith's medals on display at the Australian War Memorial in December 2011

On 31 May 2006, Roberts-Smith was a scout and sniper in a patrol (Note: A patrol consists of four to six personnel, which is usually commanded by a sergeant and occasionally by a senior corporal.) deployed during the 2006 Dutch/Australian Offensive. The patrol was commanded by Sergeant Matthew Locke. The patrol's objective was to establish an observation post on the mountain Koran Ghar, overlooking the Chora Pass in Uruzgan Province. Besides Roberts-Smith and Locke, members of the patrol comprised two junior soldiers, a British sergeant from the Special Boat Service and an American special forces radio operator. The patrol's aim was to monitor and report on Anti-Coalition Militia movements in the pass below and to maintain concealment.

On 2 June, a lone Afghan teenager, who appeared to be unarmed, approached the patrol observation post and left the area shortly thereafter. The American had seen the teenager and communicated what he saw to the rest of the team. After hearing of the teen's exit, Roberts-Smith and Locke arrived at the observation post and enquired why the teen had not been engaged. The other soldiers replied that their orders were to observe and not attract attention. Although the other soldiers had decided it was not necessary to engage the Afghan, Roberts-Smith and Locke decided to hunt him down. The patrol report identified the teenager as a single Afghan "spotter". In a 2011 oral-history interview with the Australian War Memorial, Roberts-Smith gave a different account, saying that two insurgents had approached the observation post. He said that he and Locke concluded that they had been spotted, left the post, and hunted down and killed the two men. After journalist Chris Masters queried the discrepancy, Roberts-Smith wrote to the War Memorial stating "Without the benefit of the patrol report to guide me it would appear I have confused my many engagements and identified two insurgents initially locating our observation post as opposed to one".

Following the shooting of the teen, the post became the focus of the Anti-Coalition Militia's attempts to identify and surround it. In one instance, the militia attempted to outflank the position, and Roberts-Smith was one of two members of the patrol who moved out of their secure position to kill the enemy combatants. Two members of the militia attempted to attack the post from a different position, and Roberts-Smith killed them. Seeing that the post was vulnerable, Roberts-Smith split from the team to take a position advantageous for his sniper rifle. While separated, he identified 16 Taliban advancing towards the post. While under fire, Roberts-Smith used his rifle to stop their advance. After being joined by another member of the patrol, he was able to hold off the militia until air support arrived.

In 2006, Roberts-Smith and Locke were awarded Medals for Gallantry in recognition of their actions on 2 June. His Medal for Gallantry citation states that Roberts-Smith's actions while under "fire and in a precarious position, threatened by a numerically superior force, are testament to his courage, tenacity and sense of duty to his patrol".

==== Victoria Cross ====
After completing junior leadership training in 2009, Roberts-Smith was posted to 2 Squadron, SASR as a patrol second-in-command (2IC). On 11 June 2010, at Tizak in the Kandahar Province, he and other SASR soldiers were on a mission searching for a Taliban commander during the Shah Wali Kot Offensive. Immediately upon helicopter insertion, the soldiers became pinned down by machine gun and rocket-propelled grenade (RPG) fire from multiple positions. With air support, the patrol manoeuvred to within 70 metres of their opponents' positions to launch an assault. When the assault began, the patrol drew sustained fire and was unable to advance closer than 40 metres from their objective. Roberts-Smith then identified a structure from which he would be able to get cover from fire. He approached the position and killed an enemy soldier armed with an RPG. The rest of the patrol was still pinned down by machine gun fire from three positions. He exposed his location to the enemy to draw fire away from the rest of the patrol. This was successful, and the patrol commander was able to throw a grenade, neutralising one of the positions. Disregarding his own safety, Roberts-Smith then attacked and neutralised the remaining two positions.

For his actions at Tizak he was presented with the Victoria Cross for Australia (Note: The Victoria Cross for Australia is the highest award for bravery in the Australian honours system.) (VC) by the governor-general of Australia, Quentin Bryce, at a ceremony held at Campbell Barracks on 23 January 2011. After being awarded the VC, he was described by the Australian War Memorial as "Australia's most highly decorated combat soldier from the conflict".

During his time in Afghanistan, Roberts-Smith wore a Crusader cross on his uniform. The cross was later digitally removed from a photograph released by the military to coincide with him being presented the Victoria Cross. Many Muslims consider the symbol offensive, particularly when worn by foreign military personnel in Muslim countries. The original version of the photo was obtained by The Sydney Morning Herald and The Age in 2021. Roberts-Smith has a large Jerusalem Cross tattoo on his chest.

During defamation proceedings in 2022, Person 41, a serving SASR member, testified that fellow soldiers Person 7 and Person 42 believed the events leading to Roberts-Smith's VC may have been falsified and that he was undeserving of the award. Person 7 and Person 42 were a non-commissioned officer and a Warrant Officer Class 2 respectively. They appeared in court as witnesses against Roberts-Smith in defamation proceedings and were given pseudonyms for national security reasons.

==== Patrol commander ====
Roberts-Smith's final deployment to Afghanistan was in 2012, by which time he had been promoted to corporal and served as a patrol commander. He left the Australian Regular Army in 2013 and joined the Australian Army Reserve. Roberts-Smith was awarded the Commendation for Distinguished Service as part of the 2014 Australia Day Honours on 26 January 2014. The award arose from the 2012 tour of Afghanistan, in which the citation recognised him as an "outstanding junior leader" on more than 50 high-risk operations. Roberts-Smith left the Army Reserve in 2015.

== Post-service career and war crime allegations ==
In 2013, Roberts-Smith announced that he would begin studying a Master of Business Administration (MBA) part-time at the University of Queensland (UQ) the following year. UQ offered him a scholarship for the degree, aiming to establish a program to support elite SAS soldiers moving into corporate careers.

Following the 2014 Lindt Café siege, Samantha Crompvoets, an expert on organisational culture, was hired by the Department of Defence to assess options for greater military involvement in domestic counterterrorism. Through interviews she conducted, Crompvoets became aware of serious allegations concerning the conduct of SASR soldiers in Afghanistan between 2009 and 2013. It was alleged to her that during this period, the SASR unlawfully killed thirty-nine Afghan nationals, in incidents characterised as "competition killing" and driven by blood lust.

Roberts-Smith was appointed deputy general manager of Seven Queensland in April 2015. He was soon promoted to general manager by Seven West Media's owner Kerry Stokes. When he was first promoted to general manager, some staff joked "that it would have been difficult to find a less qualified person than Roberts-Smith". He also admitted that he was "shocked" at being offered the position.

In her 2016 report, Special Operations Command (SOCOMD) Culture and Interactions: Insights and Reflections, Crompvoets recounted that a source described 2012 as the worst year, with recurring but uninvestigated reports from an Afghan interpreter that special forces soldiers were executing farmers. Crompvoets had soldiers confide to her that there was a culture of strong pressure to conform, and that some had committed atrocities to fit in. Patrol commanders were identified as wielding excessive power, reportedly acting with impunity and beyond the control of their officers. The Brereton inquiry, conducted by the Inspector-General of the Australian Defence Force, was established to examine the claims of war crimes raised in Crompvoets's report.

Roberts-Smith was also made general manager of Seven Brisbane in April 2016 following the resignation of Max Walters. He graduated with his MBA from UQ in December 2016 at age 38 and said, "I joined the army at 18 so I hadn't gone to university for a Bachelor degree and I didn't have the base level of business knowledge because there were many things I just hadn't been exposed to."

Masters published No Front Line, a history of Australian special forces in Afghanistan, in October 2017. The book drew attention to discrepancies between Roberts-Smith's account of a 2006 incident in which he and Matthew Locke killed an Afghan man they suspected of being a Taliban spotter and the accounts of the incident given to Masters. ABC News journalist Dan Oakes reported on the book, linking it to the ongoing Brereton inquiry. Responding to the publication of Masters's book, Roberts-Smith described it as inaccurate and called the scrutiny of SASR actions in Afghanistan "un-Australian". He also said the book was damaging to the legacy of Locke, who had been killed in action in 2007.

A joint ABC and Fairfax Media investigation, published on 2 June 2018, detailed an assault on the village of Darwan in September 2012 during which a handcuffed man was kicked off a cliff by an Australian special forces soldier nicknamed “Leonidas” after the famed Spartan king. Roberts-Smith was identified in later reporting as the soldier previously referred to as "Leonidas". On 6 July 2018, Fairfax Media reported that he was "one of a small number of soldiers subject to investigation by an inquiry looking into the actions of Australian special forces soldiers in Afghanistan". The next month, Fairfax Media reported that Roberts-Smith bullied several of his fellow soldiers and alleged that he had assaulted a woman he was having an affair with. Roberts-Smith denied the bullying and assault allegations.

Former Australian Federal Police (AFP) commissioner Mick Keelty informed Roberts-Smith in June 2018 that the AFP had received referrals regarding alleged war crimes. Keelty's disclosure came days after the AFP began a covert operation targeting Roberts-Smith. After learning from Keelty that he was under investigation, Roberts-Smith allegedly began using burner phones to obstruct it. The AFP said in a statement, in November 2018, that they "received a referral to investigate allegations of war crimes committed by Australian soldiers during the Afghanistan conflict".

In response to the 2018 allegations, Roberts-Smith commenced defamation proceedings in the Federal Court against Fairfax Media and two Fairfax journalists, Nick McKenzie and Chris Masters, as well as a former Fairfax journalist, David Wroe. Fairfax mounted a truth defence, based on its reporting being "substantially true". As part of this defence, Fairfax detailed a series of six unlawful killings alleged to have been carried out by Roberts-Smith in Afghanistan, including one in Darwan where they alleged that he shot an unarmed Afghan man who was hiding in rocks. The defamation trial was labelled by lawyers and media as "the trial of the century".

=== Civil trial and judgment (2020–2023) ===
By June 2020, Fairfax Media had become part of Nine Entertainment. In August 2020, it was reported that legal experts had raised concerns about a personal relationship between Roberts-Smith and his defamation lawyer, saying it could constitute unprofessional conduct by her. News Corp Australia published a photo of Roberts-Smith holding hands with the lawyer, who they reported was visiting him at his new apartment in Brisbane. The lawyer conceded that it was "unwise to spend time with him socially".

Nine Entertainment lawyer Sandy Dawson told the Federal Court on 1 September 2020 that the Australian Federal Police had information, including eyewitness accounts, that allegedly implicated Roberts-Smith in Afghanistan war crimes. The Federal Court of Australia noted later that month that no charges against Roberts-Smith had been laid.

In November 2020, the Federal Court heard that Roberts-Smith had asked his wife to falsely claim they were separated during his alleged affair with a woman referred to in the trial as Person 17, contradicting the couple's earlier public statements. That same month, The Age reported that Kerry Stokes' private investment company, Australian Capital Equity (ACE), had provided Roberts-Smith with an A$1.9 million line of credit. Calls were made at the time for Stokes, as then Australian War Memorial (AWM) chairman, to stand down over his public and private support for soldiers accused of war crimes in Afghanistan.

The findings of the Brereton inquiry, the Brereton Report, were published on 19 November 2020. The report recommended that dozens of incidents involving current and former special forces personnel be referred for criminal investigation.

The Age reported in April 2021 that the AFP was conducting a probe into allegations that Roberts-Smith had destroyed or buried evidence directly related to the ongoing investigation. An article published that month alleged that Roberts-Smith had attempted to cover up the alleged crimes by hiding incriminating images on USB drives buried in his backyard, which had since been obtained by the Australian Federal Police. Also in April 2021, Roberts-Smith temporarily stepped down from Seven Queensland to focus on his defamation action against Nine Entertainment.

In June 2021, ABC News reported that 21 current and former SAS soldiers would make "unprecedented" appearances at court to testify against Roberts-Smith in the defamation trial. The defamation trial, expected to last for ten weeks, commenced that month in Sydney.

An SAS soldier described an incident to the court where he witnessed Roberts-Smith kick a handcuffed farmer (Ali Jan) "in the chest" and made the Afghan fall backwards over a cliff edge with his face hitting a large rock, knocking out a number of his teeth, with Roberts-Smith later ordering his execution with another SAS operator under his command shooting the farmer dead. Other SAS veterans testified that Roberts-Smith machine gunned a subdued and detained Afghan with a prosthetic leg in 2009. Evidence from the eyewitnesses corroborated that Roberts-Smith also directed junior soldiers to execute unarmed prisoners. A colleague of Roberts-Smith, referred to as Person 16, told the court that Roberts-Smith had shot dead an unarmed Afghan teenage prisoner in 2012 and then said that it was "the most beautiful thing I've ever seen".

It was alleged during defamation proceedings in February 2022 that Roberts-Smith had employed a private investigator, John McLeod, to pose as a barman at a party and eavesdrop on employees of Seven Queensland to learn what they thought of him.

During the trial, former and serving SASR members provided testimony alleging that Roberts-Smith had bullied and threatened colleagues. Person 1, whose machine gun stopped working during the 2006 Battle of Chora after he failed to bring oil to lubricate it properly, testified that Roberts-Smith later told him "if your performance doesn't improve on the next patrol, you're going to get a bullet in the back of the head". After this, Person 1 was advised by other members to report Roberts-Smith's threat, which he did, leading to Roberts-Smith threatening him again, stating: "If you're going to make accusations cunt, you'd better have some fucking proof." Another witness, Person 43, agreed during his testimony that he had described Roberts-Smith as "a bully" to other colleagues.

Nine Entertainment's defence against Roberts-Smith's suit concluded in mid April 2022 after calling witnesses for eleven weeks. Submissions in the trial ended July 2022 after 110 days of evidence, during which 41 witnesses were called. Among the witnesses were 32 Australian soldiers, of whom some had served alongside Roberts-Smith, as well as several civilian eyewitnesses from Afghanistan. According to The Sydney Morning Herald, the soldiers "testified in public and on oath" but, due to national security orders, their identities were suppressed and they were referred to in court using pseudonyms such as Person 1, Person 14 and Person 18.

On 1 June 2023, Justice Anthony Besanko dismissed the defamation case brought by Roberts-Smith. Besanko found that the newspapers on trial—The Sydney Morning Herald, The Age and The Canberra Times—had established substantial or contextual truth of many of their allegations, including that Roberts-Smith "broke the moral and legal rules of military engagement and is therefore a criminal". As a defamation suit is a civil proceeding, Besanko was required by the Evidence Act 1995 (Cth) to assess the evidence using the civil standard of proof, the balance of probabilities, instead of the criminal standard of proof, beyond reasonable doubt. Due to the gravity of the allegations, Besanko followed the Briginshaw principle, which required stronger evidence than would be necessary for a less serious matter. Besanko found that four murder allegations against Roberts-Smith had been proven to this standard.

The judgment concluded that it was substantially true that:

- during the Whiskey 108 mission in 2009, Roberts-Smith committed murder "by machine gunning a man with a prosthetic leg". Roberts-Smith later asked other soldiers to drink from the prosthetic leg;
- during the same Whiskey 108 mission Roberts-Smith committed murder "by pressuring a newly deployed and inexperienced SASR soldier to execute an elderly, unarmed Afghan in order to 'blood the rookie'";
- during the Darwan mission in September 2012, Roberts-Smith "murdered an unarmed and defenceless Afghan civilian, by kicking him off a cliff and procuring the soldiers under his command to shoot him";
- during the Chinartu mission in October 2012, Roberts-Smith ordered another soldier "to shoot an Afghan male who was under detention"; with instructions being given "to an NDS-Wakunish soldier who then shot the Afghan male in circumstances amounting to murder", rendering Roberts-Smith "complicit in and responsible for murder". (Note: ”NDS-Wakunish” refers to Afghan Partner Force soldiers, also known at the time as Wakunish or Wakas, who were deployed alongside coalition forces for mentoring.)

It was ruled that two allegations of murder at Syahchow and Fasil in 2012 were not proven.

Besanko separately found that it was proven that:

- in 2010, Roberts-Smith physically attacked an unarmed Afghan man until two patrol commanders ordered him to stop;
- in 2012, Roberts-Smith assaulted a second unarmed Afghan man and authorised the assault of a third unarmed Afghan man who was being held in custody and did not pose a threat; and
- Roberts-Smith engaged in a "campaign of bullying" and threatened violence against an Australian soldier.

Allegations that Roberts-Smith committed domestic violence and threatened to report another soldier to the International Criminal Court were found to have not been proven. The judgement concluded that this did not further harm Roberts-Smith's reputation given the other substantially true allegations, thus establishing contextual truth. Judge Besanko also stated that Roberts-Smith was not a reliable witness due to having an obvious motive to lie. Besanko also stated that he believed that Roberts-Smith had threatened a soldier who gave testimony against him.

Roberts-Smith resigned from Seven on 2 June 2023, the day after the case's unsuccessful outcome. Later that month, the ABC reported allegations that he directed another SASR soldier to kill an elderly imam during an August 2012 operation in Afghanistan. It was alleged that this led to the man being dragged from a mosque and killed despite him being unarmed and a prisoner of the Australians. The Brereton inquiry recommended that the incident be referred to war crimes investigators, after finding credible information that the imam was unarmed and under the control of Australian soldiers when he was killed.

Roberts-Smith stated on 15 June 2023 that he was proud of his actions in Afghanistan and would not be apologising. Later in June, he accepted his liability to pay the legal costs of his failed defamation suit from 17 March 2020 against the three newspapers. Chris Masters, one of the respondents in the case, stated that Nine Entertainment spent approximately $30 million defending it.

Kim Beazley, Chair of the Australian War Memorial Council, acknowledged in 2023 "the gravity of the decision in the Ben Roberts-Smith VC MG defamation case and its broader impact on all involved in the Australian community". Beazley added that careful consideration was being given to the additional content and context to be included in collection items on display.

In November 2023, it was ruled that Roberts-Smith should pay approximately ninety-five per cent of the costs incurred by Nine Entertainment from when he began proceedings against them in 2018. The following month, Kerry Stokes's private investment company, Australian Capital Equity, was ordered to pay costs.

=== Appeals (2023–2025) ===
After being granted an extension to the standard deadline for lodging an appeal, Roberts-Smith filed an appeal against Justice Besanko’s judgment with the Full Court of the Federal Court on 11 July 2023. Nine Entertainment said it would oppose the appeal. In October, ahead of the appeal, the Federal Court ordered Roberts-Smith to pay $910,000 as security for costs. The Full Court heard the appeal over ten days from 5 February 2024.

Roberts-Smith attended Government House, Perth, in June of that year to receive the King Charles III Coronation Medal, which King Charles III bestowed on all living Australian recipients of the Victoria Cross. Australian Prime Minister Anthony Albanese commented that the decision to include Roberts-Smith had been made by Buckingham Palace and not the Australian government, although they had previously indicated to the palace that they had "no objections" to the making of the awards.

The Guardian reported in August 2024 that former AFP commissioner Mick Keelty had resigned from the Order of Australia on 8 December of the prior year. The Guardian stated that the resignation came six years after Keelty had tipped Roberts-Smith off about an AFP investigation into him.

The Sydney Morning Herald reported in September 2024 that Roberts-Smith had attended a recent Australian Defence Force gala dinner to celebrate the sixtieth anniversary of the SASR and that some who had served in the special forces found this inappropriate. The same article said that the Office of the Special Investigator could soon bring criminal charges against Roberts-Smith, including for war crimes and other criminal offences.

Lawyers for Roberts-Smith filed an interlocutory application with the Federal Court on 27 March 2025, seeking to amend his appeal after a secret recording emerged of Nick McKenzie appearing to say he had been briefed on Roberts-Smith's legal strategy by his ex-partner and her friend, which his lawyers argued may have affected the outcome of the trial. Roberts-Smith's lawyers sought "wide-ranging subpoenas" as part of the application to re-open the appeal, which Nine Entertainment's lawyers opposed, calling them a "fishing expedition". Justice Nye Perram denied the majority of Roberts-Smith's subpoenas, allowing only subpoenas for communications between Nick McKenzie's and Nine Entertainment's lawyers, and between Roberts-Smith's ex-wife and a friend of hers.

The recording, between McKenzie and a witness known as Person 17, was admitted into evidence in May 2025. McKenzie was recorded telling Person 17 that Roberts-Smith's ex-partner and her friend had been "actively briefing us on his legal strategy in respect of you ... we anticipated most of it. One or two things now we know", Roberts-Smith's lawyers told the court. In court, Roberts-Smith argued that his ex-partner had accessed his email accounts and passed on privileged communications to McKenzie.

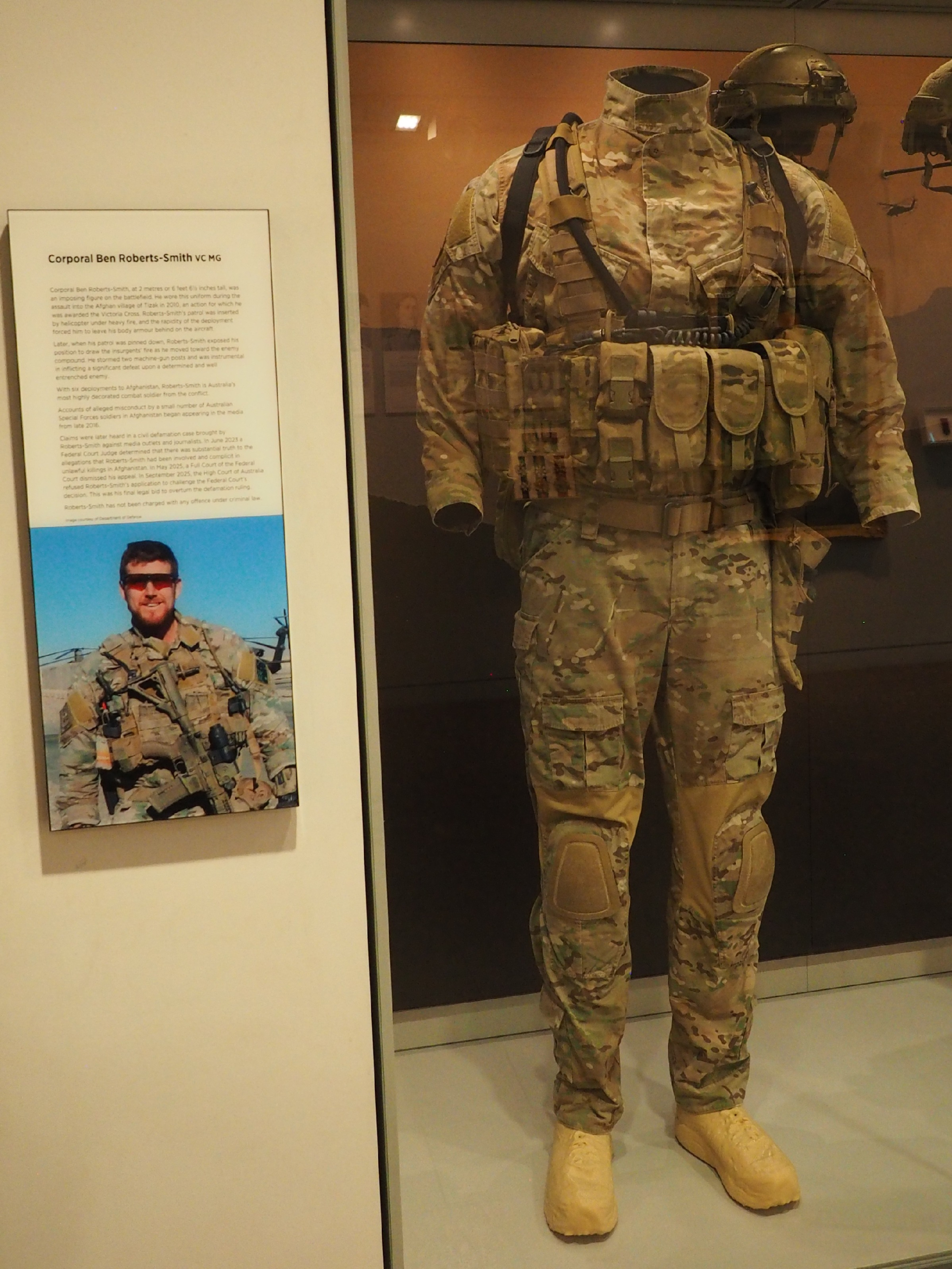
Roberts-Smith's uniform on display in the Australian War Memorial in 2026, with a label noting the findings of the defamation case and appeals

Roberts-Smith lost his appeal against Besanko's ruling on 16 May 2025. The Full Court of the Federal Court unanimously found that he was not defamed when Nick McKenzie and Chris Masters published reports alleging he had committed war crimes in Afghanistan. "We are unanimously of the opinion that the evidence was sufficiently cogent to support the findings that [Roberts-Smith] ... murdered four Afghan men" the court stated, ordering Roberts-Smith to pay the respondents' legal costs. The interlocutory application to amend the appeal was also dismissed, with judges expressing doubts about the integrity of the secret recording, stating they could not be confident "that the contents of the recording have not been doctored by removing sections or splicing together different parts of a recorded conversation". The trial cost the parties a combined $30 million in legal costs, with the appeal costing a further $4 million.

On 16 June 2025, Roberts-Smith sought special leave in the High Court of Australia to appeal against the judgment of the Full Federal Court. He argued that Besanko's judgment had branded him a war criminal, despite coming as a consequence of civil proceedings; and that the rules of evidence should have been applied more strictly, given that Roberts-Smith had not been charged with any criminal offence and was entitled to a presumption of innocence.

The High Court refused his application for leave to appeal and ordered him to pay costs on 4 September 2025. Following the High Court's rejection of Roberts-Smith's appeal that month, the Australian War Memorial updated the wording of his display to state that the refusal was his final legal bid to challenge the defamation judgment.

==== Funding ====
Throughout his legal actions, Roberts-Smith has been supported by several prominent Australians. Stokes funded his original civil proceedings, as noted above. John Singleton paid for newspaper advertising which called attacks on Roberts-Smith "disgraceful". In May 2025, Gina Rinehart, Australia's richest person, said: "Many patriotic Australians query, is it fair that this brave and patriotic man who risked his life on overseas missions which he was sent on by our government, is under such attack." When questioned, Rinehart refused to rule out funding Roberts-Smith's defamation action. The media respondents obtained and served a Federal Court subpoena for Rinehart to produce documents showing that she or any of her companies were involved in funding Roberts-Smith's legal proceedings. However, they later accepted Rinehart's lawyers' assurance that she possessed no such documents.

On 9 September 2025, the Federal Court ordered Roberts-Smith together with Kerry Stokes's private company Australian Capital Equity to pay costs fixed at $13.3 million to the media respondents, plus a costs assessment fee of $225,000 for the application for costs.

=== Arrest and charges (2026) ===
External videos
- 7.30 segment: Ben Roberts-Smith arrested over alleged war crimes (7 April 2026)
- Vision of Ben Roberts-Smith under arrest at Sydney Airport (7 April 2026)
- AFP & OSI press conference announcing arrest and charges (7 April 2026)

A joint task force with personnel from the Office of the Special Investigator and a team of AFP investigators, known as Operation Emerald-Argon, began investigating the allegations of war crimes in 2021. On 7 April 2026, Roberts-Smith was arrested by the Australian Federal Police at Sydney Airport. He was subsequently charged under section 268.70(1) of the Criminal Code Act 1995 with five charges of the war crime of murder (Note: In Australian federal law, the war crime of murder is defined as: 268.70 War crime—murder (1) A person (the perpetrator) commits an offence if: (a) the perpetrator causes the death of one or more persons; and (b) the person or persons are neither taking an active part in the hostilities nor are members of an organised armed group; and (c) the perpetrator knows of, or is reckless as to, the factual circumstances establishing that the person or persons are neither taking an active part in the hostilities nor are members of an organised armed group; and (d) the perpetrator's conduct takes place in the context of, and is associated with, an armed conflict that is not an international armed conflict. Penalty: Imprisonment for life. (1A) Subsection (1) does not apply if: (a) the death of the person or persons occurs in the course of, or as a result of, an attack on a military objective; and (b) at the time the attack was launched: (i) the perpetrator did not expect that the attack would result in the incidental death of, or injury to, civilians that would have been excessive in relation to the concrete and direct military advantage anticipated; and (ii) it was reasonable in all the circumstances that the perpetrator did not have such an expectation. Note: A defendant bears an evidential burden in relation to the matter in subsection (1A). See subsection 13.3(3). (2) To avoid doubt, a reference in subsection (1) to a person or persons who are not taking an active part in the hostilities includes a reference to: (a) a person or persons who are hors de combat; or (b) civilians, medical personnel or religious personnel who are not taking an active part in the hostilities. (3) For the purposes of this section, the expression members of an organised armed group does not include members of an organised armed group who are hors de combat.) with a potential maximum sentence of life imprisonment. It was alleged that he either carried out the killings or "aided, abetted, counselled or procured" others to carry them out. The first two charges relate to the alleged killing of two men at a compound known as Whiskey 108 in Kakarak, Uruzgan Province, on 12 April 2009. A third charge relates to the alleged killing of Ali Jan at Darwan in September 2012, and the other two charges to the alleged killing of two detained men at Syahchow in October 2012. He was remanded to the Silverwater Correctional Complex to appear before the online bail court on 8 April 2026. His legal counsel declined to apply for bail at that hearing. Subject to strict conditions and a $250,000 surety, bail was granted on 17 April.

Roberts-Smith has sought funding for his defence from the Afghanistan Inquiry Legal Assistance Scheme, a Commonwealth Attorney-General's Department program that provides assistance for legal representation and related costs for current and former ADF members who have been "charged with a crime in relation to matters that are the subject of the AFP or OSI Afghanistan investigation". Although no formal court plea has been entered, Roberts-Smith said in a public statement on 19 April 2026 that he denies the charges. On 1 September 2026, Judge Susan Horan made 206 orders under the National Security Information Act to allow national security information to be provided to Roberts-Smith in a brief of evidence. At a hearing on 8 September 2026, prosecutors advised a local court that they had provided his defence with a "substantial proportion" of the evidence against him, including about 4,000 documents and 234 witness statements. Of the persons named in the evidence provided to Roberts-Smith, 723 had pseudonyms in line with the orders made a week earlier. His lawyer, Karen Espiner, argued to Judge Horan that the use of so many pseudonyms would make it harder to prepare a defence against the charges of the war crime of murder. On 13 October, Espiner told the court that she planned on challenging a request from the prosecution for orders prohibiting the publication of the names of witnesses. The matter is due to return to court on 8 December 2026.

It was reported, on 16 October 2026, that Roberts-Smith had launched a brand, Epic 1 Two. The brand was named after his military radio call sign and in an interview he stated that its activities would include the sale of clothing. Roberts-Smith stated that income from the venture would be used to support his family and his legal expenses.

In the lead-up to his trial, Roberts-Smith launched a media campaign. News Corp media outlets published supportive stories. Most other media criticised the campaign. ABC Media Watch called it "a slickly choreographed PR offensive" that was "welcomed with open arms" by News Corp media outlets. In The Sydney Morning Herald (SMH), Hugh Riminton described the intended audience as "the 12 as-yet unselected members of the jury". On 22 October, Roberts-Smith gave an interview to 2GB radio host Ben Fordham. When asked if he would change anything if he was given the chance, he said that he would not change anything about his military career. He denied any wrongdoing and stated that he had always acted within the rules of engagement.

== Public perceptions ==
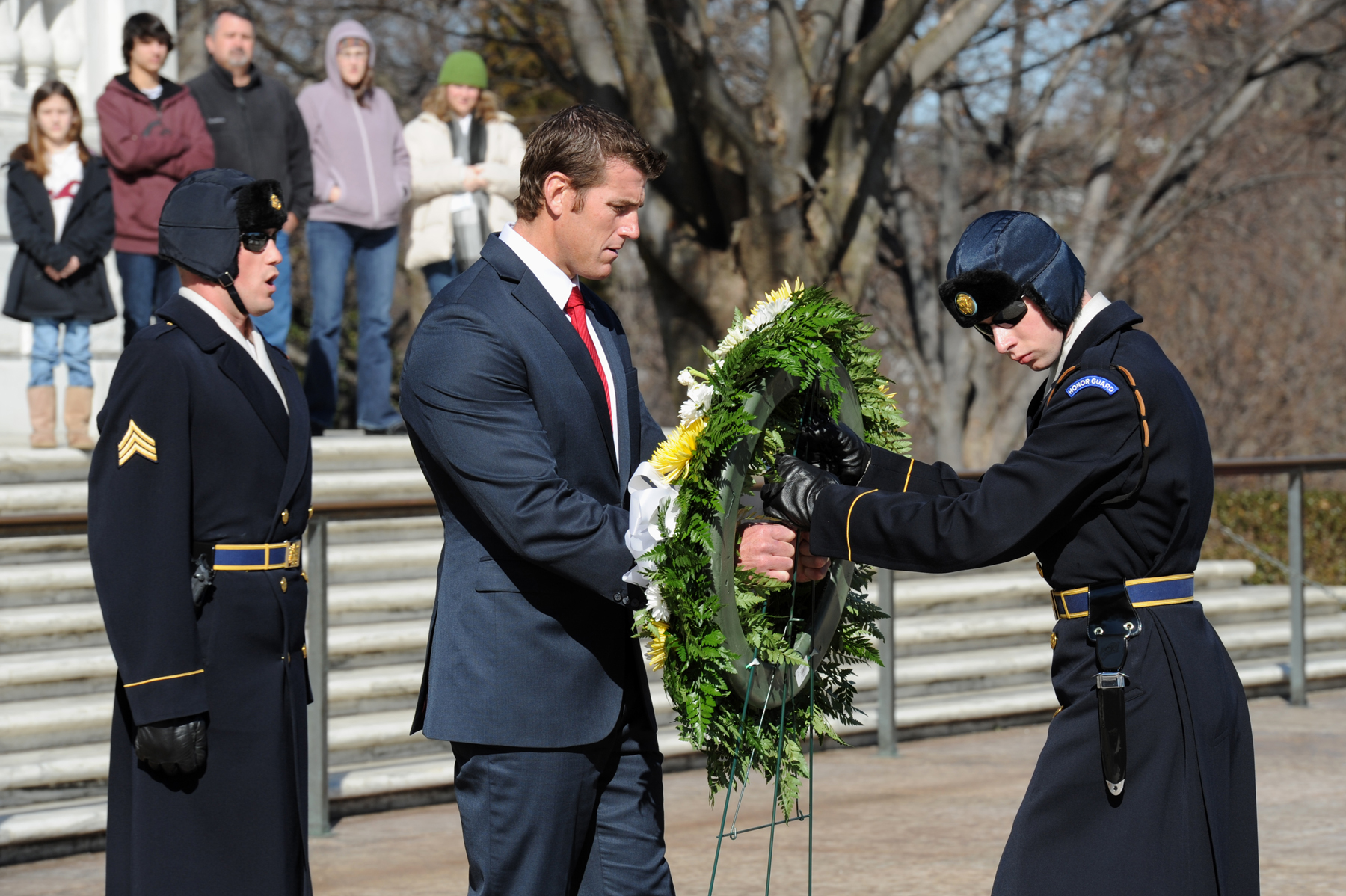
Ben Roberts-Smith placing a wreath at the Tomb of the Unknown Soldier, Arlington National Cemetery, USA, in 2012

Prior to the publication of war crimes and domestic violence allegations, Roberts-Smith was widely regarded as one of Australia's most admired and highly decorated soldiers. He was considered a national hero. Roberts-Smith was the Fremantle Football Club's number-one ticket holder for the 2012 to 2015 Australian Football League seasons. In 2013, he was named Australian Father of the Year by The Shepherd Centre, a not-for-profit charitable organisation. In 2014, Roberts-Smith was made deputy chair of then Prime Minister Tony Abbott's mental health advisory committee.

The combat uniform Roberts-Smith wore during the battle in Afghanistan for which he was awarded the Victoria Cross is displayed at the Australian War Memorial. The Memorial also commissioned a 2014 painting of him, Michael Zavros's Pistol Grip. From 2014 to 2017, Roberts-Smith served as Chair of the National Australia Day Council, (Note: The National Australia Day Council serves as the national coordinating body for the Australian of the Year awards and Australia Day celebrations.) a social enterprise owned by the Australian Government. His voice, alongside others, was featured on Australian country singer Lee Kernaghan's 2015 track "Lest We Forget" from the album Spirit of the Anzacs. The National Portrait Gallery commissioned a photographic portrait of him by Julian Kingma in 2018.

According to Roberts-Smith, he lost approximately $475,000 worth of speaking engagements after the allegations against him were published. He had been offered a partnership at consulting firm PwC; however, after he had informed them of the allegations, the job had not proceeded. When his civil action was dismissed in June 2023, the ABC reported that Justice Besanko had found Roberts-Smith's reputation had been lowered to the point that two unproven allegations of battlefield murder would not be defamatory. Besanko also upheld that he had "disgraced his country Australia and the Australian Army by his conduct as a member of the SASR in Afghanistan".

Roberts-Smith's arrest and prosecution has generally divided opinion along existing political and cultural lines. Former prime ministers John Howard and Tony Abbott have both defended him publicly. In a statement in April 2026, Howard described him as the "modern personification of the Anzac tradition". In the same month, Abbott said the rules of engagement in Afghanistan had been overly restrictive and that combat actions should not be judged by civilian standards. One Nation senator Pauline Hanson has voiced continuing support. Support for Roberts-Smith has extended to figures on the far right. Not all conservative figures have backed him unconditionally. Liberal Party politician Andrew Hastie, who had testified against Roberts-Smith during the defamation trial, said that no one was above the law. Columnist Andrew Bolt challenged Roberts-Smith's supporters directly. He asked them to consider the specific nature of the allegations, including the killing of unarmed and injured prisoners.

== Personal life ==
Roberts-Smith met his former wife, Emma Groom, in 1998 at an army ball in Sydney when he was 19. She came from a military family. On 6 December 2003, they married at the University of Western Australia. Their twin daughters were born in 2010. Groom concieved them by IVF. On retirement from the army in 2015, Roberts-Smith moved to Queensland with his wife and daughters.

In April 2018, Person 17 arrived at Groom's house and showed her hundreds of text messages sent by Roberts-Smith, revealing that Roberts-Smith had been having an affair with Person 17. Roberts-Smith and Groom separated in January 2020 and their divorce had finalised by late 2020/early 2021. In January 2022, Roberts-Smith was ordered to pay his former wife's legal costs after unsuccessfully trying to sue her in the Federal Court over allegations that she had accessed confidential emails.

== See also ==
- Breaker Morant – British officer executed for war crimes (1864–1902)
- Surafend massacre – 1918 massacre in Palestine by Allied troops (by Anzacs)
- Killing of Dad Mohammad – 2012 homicide by Australian soldiers
- Flawed Hero – 2023 non-fiction book by Chris Masters
- Crossing the Line – 2023 non-fiction book by Nick McKenzie
