= Australian Political Book of the Year =

Australian non-fiction award

The Australian Political Book of the Year is an annual award for political writing. It was inaugurated in 2022 and is sponsored by Collins Booksellers and the York Park Group. Dean Ashenden won the inaugural prize of A$10,000. Since 2023, the winner has received A$15,000 and shortlisted authors A$1,000.

== Winners ==
Year	Author	Title	Publisher	Result	Ref.
2022	Dean Ashenden	Telling Tennant's Story : The Strange Career of the Great Australian Silence	Black Inc.	Winner	
2022	Allan Behm	No Enemies No Friends: Restoring Australia’s Global Relevance	Upswell Publishing	Shortlisted	
2022	Troy Bramston	Bob Hawke: Demons and destiny	Penguin Random House	Shortlisted	
2022	Sean Kelly	The Game: A Portrait of Scott Morrison	Black Inc.	Shortlisted	
2022	Stephen Charles and Catherine Williams	Keeping Them Honest: The case for a genuine national integrity commission and other vital democratic reforms	Scribe Publications	Longlisted	
2022	Tom Greenwell and Chris Bonnor	Waiting for Gonski: How Australia failed it schools	NewSouth Books	Longlisted	
2022	Gideon Haigh	The Brilliant Boy: Doc Evatt and the Great Australian Dissent	Simon & Schuster	Longlisted	
2022	Scott Hamilton and Stuart Kells	Sold Down The River: How Robber Barons and Wall Street Traders Concerned Australia's Water Market	Text Publishing	Longlisted	
2022	Julianne Schultz	The Idea of Australia: A search for the soul of the nation	Allen & Unwin	Longlisted	
2022	Mark Willacy	Rogue Forces: An explosive insiders' account of Australian SAS war crimes in Afghanistan	Simon & Schulster	Longlisted	
2023	Niki Savva	Bulldozed: Scott Morrison's fall and Anthony Albanese's rise	Scribe Publications	Winner	
2023	James Curran	Australia's China Odyssey: From euphoria to fear	NewSouth Books	Shortlisted	
2023	Russell Marks	Black Lives, White Law: Locked up and locked out in Australia	La Trobe University Press	Shortlisted	
2023	Nick McKenzie	Crossing the Line	Hachette	Shortlisted	
2023	Frank Bongiorno	Dreamers and Schemers: A political history of Australia	La Trobe University Press	Longlisted	
2023	Stan Grant	The Queen is Dead: The time has come for a reckoning	HarperCollins	Longlisted	
2023	Chip Le Grand	Lockdown	Monash University Press	Longlisted	
2023	Chris Wallace	Political Lives	NewSouth Books	Longlisted	
2023	Don Watson	The Passion of Private White	Simon & Schuster	Longlisted	
2023	Bruce Wolpe	Trump's Australia	Allen & Unwin	Longlisted	
2024	Chris Masters	Flawed Hero: Truth, lies and war crimes	Allen & Unwin	Winner	
2024	Lech Blaine	Quarterly Essay #93: Bad Cop: Peter Dutton's Strongman Politics	Black Inc.	Shortlisted	
2024	Ryan Cropp	Donald Horne: A Life in the Lucky Country	La Trobe University Press	Shortlisted	
2024	David Marr	Killing for Country: A Family Story	Allen & Unwin	Shortlisted	
2024	Adam Behm	The Odd Couple: The Australia–America Relationship	Upswell Publishing	Longlisted	
2024	David Hardaker	Mine Is the Kingdom	Allen & Unwin	Longlisted	
2024	Alan Kohler	Quarterly Essay #92: The Great Divide: Australia's Housing Mess and How to Fix It	Black Inc.	Longlisted	
2024	Anne Manne	Crimes of the Cross	Black Inc.	Longlisted	
2024	Cameron K. Murray	The Great Housing Hijack	Allen & Unwin	Longlisted	
2024	Sam Roggeveen	Echidna Strategy: Australia's Search for Power and Peace	La Trobe University Press	Longlisted	
2025	Clare Wright	Naku Dharuk: The Bark Petitions	Text Publishing	Winner	
2025	Joe Aston	The Chairman's Lounge	Scribner	Shortlisted	
2025	Andrew Fowler	Nuked	Melbourne University Press	Shortlisted	
2025	Rick Morton	Mean Streak	Fourth Estate	Shortlisted	
2025	Eric Beecher	The Men Who Killed the News	Scribner	Longlisted	
2025	Milton Cockburn	The Assassination of Neville Wran	Connor Court	Longlisted	
2025	Erik Eklund	Politics, Pride and Perversion	ANU Press	Longlisted	
2025	Ross Garnaut	Let's Tax Carbon	La Trobe University Press	Longlisted	
2025	Jess Hill	Losing It	Quarterly Essay	Longlisted	
2025	Shireen Morris	Broken Heart: A True History of the Voice Referendum	La Trobe University Press	Longlisted	
2026	Paul Strangio	The Alchemy of Leadership	Melbourne University Press	Winner	
2026	Troy Bramston	Gough Whitlam: The Vista of the New	HarperCollins	Shortlisted	
2026	Virginia Haussegger	The Unfinished Revolution	NewSouth Publishing	Shortlisted	
2026	Niki Savva	Earthquake	Scribe	Shortlisted	
2026	Ed Coper	Angertainment	Summit Books	Longlisted	
2026	Andrew Dodd and Matthew Ricketson	Getting Murdoched	Hardie Grant Books	Longlisted	
2026	Amy Remeikis	Where It All Went Wrong	Scribner	Longlisted	
2026	Lachlan Strahan	The Curious Diplomat	Monash University Publishing	Longlisted	
2026	Debbie Whitmont	The Man Who Couldn't Wait	Allen & Unwin	Longlisted	
2026	Kate Wild	The Red House	Allen & Unwin	Longlisted	
