= Pamela Williams (journalist) =

Australian investigative journalist and author

Pamela Williams (born 1954) is an Australian investigative journalist and author.

Commencing her career at BRW, Williams is best known for her work with The Australian Financial Review, where she worked from 1987 until 2014. After working in various positions at the newspaper including being the news editor and editor-at-large, Williams left The Australian Financial Review in 2014 to pursue a career in writing novels.

Williams had previously written two best-selling non-fiction books. In 1997, Williams authored The Victory detailing the Coalition's victory at the 1996 Australian federal election and in 2013, Williams wrote Killing Fairfax: Packer, Murdoch and the Ultimate Revenge, which looked at the decline of Australian media company Fairfax and won the 2013 Walkley Book Award.

In December 2014, Williams joined The Australian as a senior writer.

In 2019, Williams wrote an essay for The Monthly, focusing on the 2018 Liberal Party of Australia leadership spills.

During her career, Williams has been awarded six Walkley Awards, including the Gold Walkley in 1998 for her story A Plan To Smash A Union, investigating the 1998 Australian waterfront dispute.

Williams' other awards include the Graham Perkin Australian Journalist of the Year Award, a Melbourne Press Club Quill Award and the University of Technology Sydney George Munster Award. Williams rejoined The Australian Financial Review as Writer-at-large in May 2019.
