= Helen Pitt =

Australian journalist

- Born: Sydney
- Education: Charles Sturt University (Bachelor of Journalism)
- Occupation: Journalist · Author · Tour guide
- Years active: 1986–present
- Notable work: The House
- Awards: Walkley Book Award (2018)

Helen Pitt is an Australian journalist and author. She reported for The Sydney Morning Herald from 1986 to 2024. Pitt wrote the book The House: The dramatic story of the Sydney Opera House and the people who made it, which won the 2018 Walkley Book Award.

== Career ==
Pitt had always wanted to be a journalist, and had her first Sydney Morning Herald byline at 16-years-old, on 8 September 1986, when she wrote an opinion piece for her high school newspaper on the film Puberty Blues. After writing her first byline, she won a cadetship with the newspaper. She was appointed Melbourne correspondent with the paper in 1988, one of the youngest journalists in an interstate bureau. Pitt took a voluntary redundancy from the Herald in 2024. As of 2025, Pitt is currently a senior writer and has also been an editor for opinions and letters.

The House, Helen Pitt's most acclaimed publication, written about the Sydney Opera House

She has also worked as a feature writer for The Bulletin magazine, the New York Times Digital, and as a reporter at Euronews.

Pitt has written and published several books, both fiction and non-fiction. Her book The House was published with the publishing house Allen & Unwin, while her other works are self-published. The AU Review describes The House as "an exhilarating look at the Opera House's colourful and dramatic history", and rates it five stars. More recently, she wrote about Luna Park, a fun park in Sydney Australia.

Pitt also works as a tour guide with Renaissance Tours, a company that specialises in cultural tours.

== Awards ==
- Walkley Book Award (2018) – For her work on the book The House: The Dramatic Story of the Sydney Opera House and the People who Made it
- UN Media Peace Prize
- Austcare Media Award

== Personal life ==
Pitt was born and raised in Sydney, and is a sixth-generation Sydneysider. She lived in France for three years while working as a reporter for Euronews and is fluent in French.

She has survived breast cancer, which led her to write her book Beating the Banana: Breast Cancer and Me.

Her husband, William, died of a brain tumour in 2005, while the couple were living in San Francisco for his treatment. The trustees of the Journalists Benevolent Fund assisted her in paying for William's funeral as well as contribute partially to her salary when she was working part-time to care for her elderly parents.

== Bibliography ==
- Pitt, Helen (2016). Beating the Banana: Breast Cancer and Me. APS Publications. ISBN 9781911310402.
- Pitt, Helen (2016). The Strange Free-Fall of Fred Ryland. CreateSpace Independent Publishing Platform. ISBN 9781534833227.
- Pitt, Helen (2018). The House: The Dramatic Story of the Sydney Opera House and the People who Made it. Allen & Unwin. ISBN 9781760636661.
- Pitt, Helen (2018). Tales From Pinfold Farms. CreateSpace Independent Publishing Platform. ISBN 9781726483148.
- Pitt, Helen (2020). The Erstwhile Buddhist: A Year In Darwin. APS Books. ISBN 9781789961263.
- Pitt, Helen (2020). Leaving Lewis. Draft2digital. ISBN 9781393225614.
- Pitt, Helen (2021). The Old Lady Files. APS Books. ISBN 9781789965810.
- Pitt, Helen (2025). Charitable Tales. APS Books. ISBN 9798230922742.
- Pitt, Helen (3 March 2026). Luna Park. Allen & Unwin. ISBN 9781761065118.
