= The Great Housing Hijack =

2024 book by Australian economist Cameron K. Murray

- Author: Cameron K. Murray
- Language: English
- Publication date: 2024

The Great Housing Hijack is a 2024 book by Australian economist Cameron K. Murray.

== Reception ==
=== Critical reception ===
Richie Black of Arts Hub reviewed the book as "a valuable, engaging read" that was "enjoyably combative and contrarian." Andrew Chuter of Green Left reviewed it as a "highly accessible and much-needed book." Nathan Smith of The Saturday Paper wrote that the book "ignores inflammatory debates to instead offer a dispassionate and clear-headed 'economic theory of property markets,'" that "provides a bold and refreshing economic analysis of Australia’s housing system, drawing attention to property monopolies and unfair push-pull rules."

Elizabeth Baldwin and Brendan Coates of the Grattan Institute reviewed the book more negatively, saying that "his analysis is inconsistent with the evidence, and his proposed solution yet another distraction." In particular, Baldwin and Coates argued that Murray's argument that developers will only build a limited number of houses, regardless of planning regulations, was based on a small sample size of developers and that it ignores that planning regulations can be modified to disincentivise holding on to land without building. Baldwin and Coates also argue that Murray's proposed "HouseMate" solution would end up effectively as a lottery, instead of a fair method of distributing housing.

=== Awards and recognition ===
The book was longlisted for the 2024 Australian Political Book of the Year.
