= Jonestown (book) =

2006 Australian biography

Jonestown: The Power and The Myth of Alan Jones
- Author: Chris Masters
- Language: English
- Subject: Alan Jones
- Genre: Biography
- Publisher: Allen & Unwin Australia
- Publication date: October 2006
- Publication place: Australia
- Media type: Hardcover
- Pages: 512 (Hardcover edition)
- ISBN: 978-1-74175-156-7
- OCLC: 85485455
- Dewey Decimal: 791.443 22
- LC Class: PN1991.4.J664 M37 2006

Jonestown: The Power and The Myth of Alan Jones is a 2006 biography of radio personality Alan Jones by Chris Masters. The biography deals in part with Jones's sexuality. Masters asserts that Jones is homosexual, which Jones has never acknowledged. Masters began Jonestown in 2002 after profiling Jones for an episode of the current affairs program Four Corners.

== Awards and nominations ==
=== Nominations ===
The book was nominated for the 2006 Douglas Stewart Prize for Non-Fiction for its "depth of research, fluency of narrative and professional engagement".

=== Awards ===
The book won the Australian Book Industry Award for Australian Biography of the Year for 2007.

== Controversy ==
On 29 June 2006, ABC Enterprises announced that it was cancelling the publication of Masters' manuscript. ABC Enterprises director Robyn Watts stated that it was because it would "almost certainly result in commercial loss, which would be irresponsible". The statement was widely believed to be a veiled reference to the fact that Jones's lawyers had threatened an expensive defamation lawsuit if the book was published. The ABC program Media Watch reported that the decision to cancel publication had not been made by ABC Enterprises but by the ABC Board. Many ABC personalities criticised the Board's decision, and a petition against the decision circulated, with signatories including ABC radio personalities Richard Glover and Phillip Adams.

During his show on 2UE on 5 July 2006, Mike Carlton, Jones's rival Sydney radio broadcaster, suggested that the book might detail homosexual encounters on Jones's part, and that Jones's lawyers had told the ABC that Masters' material was "replete with false and inappropriate sexual innuendo".

In the introduction to Jonestown, Masters describes Jones as having concealed his sexuality "more for the sake of preserving a dishonest power base" than for reasons of personal privacy, an explanation he repeated later, after he was accused of being motivated by prurience. Masters says that Jones's attempt to mask his sexuality is a defining feature of his personality and provides an explanation for many aspects of his behaviour. In the book's final chapter, Masters quotes a study performed by Roy Morgan Research which reported that "46% of [Jones's] listeners believe that homosexuality is immoral, compared to 35% of all Australians." Masters' attempts to explain so much about Jones by reference to his sexuality caused the commentator Miranda Devine to see his book as homophobic.

The decision of the ABC not to publish the book delayed its release by less than three months, and publisher Allen & Unwin Australia released it in October 2006. The book sold 12,700 copies and earned almost A$600,000 in its first six days after publication, placing it at the top of the best-seller list for its category.

On 20 October 2006, The Sydney Morning Herald published a seven-page edited extract of Jonestown. The extract, with italicised links by former Media Watch host and author David Marr, concentrated mainly on the claims that Jones was homosexual, his behaviour while the senior English master at The King's School at Parramatta in Sydney, and an alleged "cottaging" incident in London. The lead paragraph set out Masters' claim that the masking of his homosexuality is "a defining feature of the Jones persona".

Australian satirical comedy group, The Chaser, said they had a signed copy of Jonestown, which they claimed to be "probably the only signed copy of Jonestown by Alan Jones", and Julian Morrow stated on The Chaser's War on Everything that they intended to "auction it off to raise money for troubled homosexuals". In the Season 2 DVD Commentary track, Morrow and Craig Reucassel confirmed that the book had also been signed by Chris Masters and was sold at auction, with the proceeds given to a child cancer charity.

In a sharply critical review published in The Australian, legal academic David Flint said that "Masters is entitled to investigate and challenge Jones's influence and role, but he is not entitled to intrude into his private life based on purloined correspondence, amateur psychoanalysis and irresponsible journalism. No wonder the ABC board wrote off the public money poured into this vengeful project by the nomenklatura. The result is no credit to its author, its publishers and the two newspapers that featured the most salacious bits." Masters replied to that and other criticisms in an opinion piece in the same newspaper in October 2006.
