= Briginshaw v Briginshaw =

Prominent Australian High Court case decided in 1938

- Court: High Court of Australia
- Decided: 30 June 1938
- Citations: [1938] HCA 34, 60 CLR 336

Court membership
- Judges sitting: Latham CJ, Rich, Starke, Dixon and McTiernan JJ

Case opinions
- On the standard of proof applicable under the Marriage Act 1928 (Vic), the lower court's finding that there was insufficient evidence to conclude Mrs Briginshaw was adulterous, should be upheld

Briginshaw v Briginshaw (often known simply as Briginshaw) is a 1938 decision of the High Court of Australia which considered how the requisite standard of proof should operate in civil proceedings.

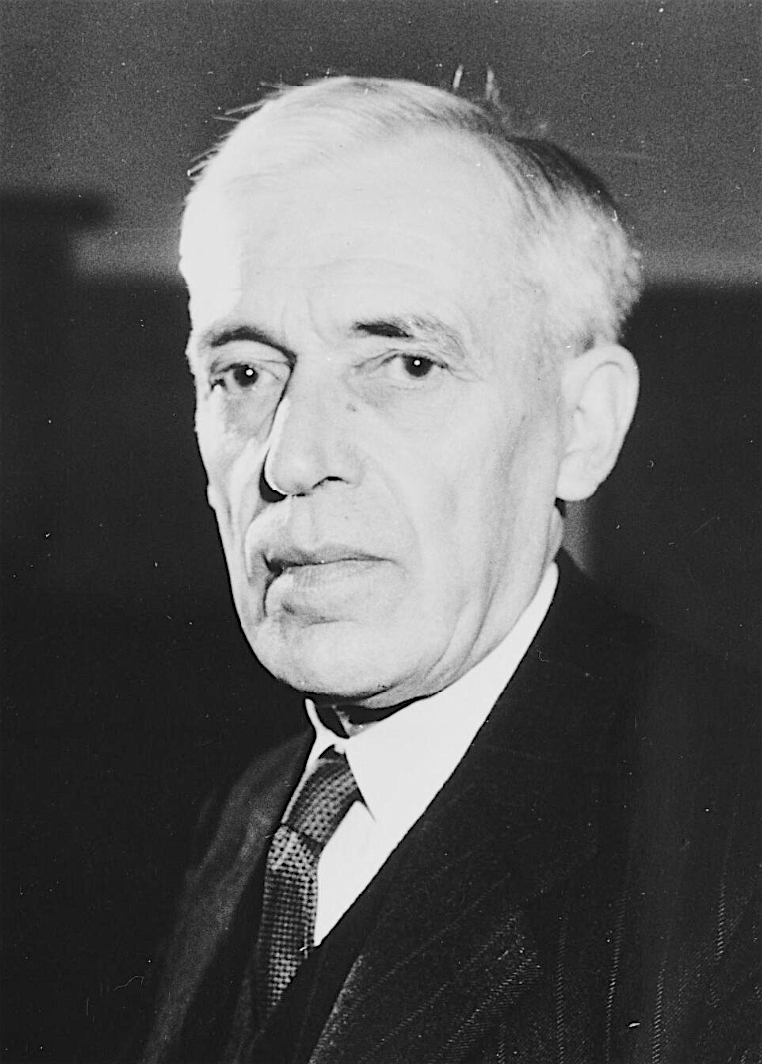
Portrait of Owen Dixon, who wrote the most frequently cited passage of Briginshaw v Briginshaw

The case is notable for having originated the "Briginshaw standard", a legal doctrine deriving from Justice Dixon's obiter remarks within the case. In its present application, Briginshaw is precedent for the idea that "the strength of evidence necessary to establish facts on the balance of probabilities, may depend on the nature of what is sought to be proven". In particular it holds that cogent or strict proof is necessary to support a judicial finding of serious allegations (such as fraud or sexual assault).

While the case related to divorce law, it also served to confirm that the balance of probabilities is the applicable standard of proof in all civil proceedings, subject to statute. Prior to Briginshaw, due to the state of the law in England at the time, Australian law regarding the onus of proof in divorce cases "was a little confused".

== Background ==
=== Facts ===
At dispute was a petition for divorce by Frederick Briginshaw against his wife Clarice Briginshaw. The petition relied upon an allegation that Mrs Briginshaw was adulterous, and at the time of this petition the parties had ceased living together. Mrs Briginshaw was residing in Tasmania, having moved from the couple's joint home in Melbourne. Before leaving for Tasmania, Mrs Briginshaw obtained an order requiring Mr Briginshaw to pay her a form of alimony maintenance in the form of 35 shillings a week. Mr Briginshaw accused Mrs Briginshaw of adultery because she had been seen attending dances with another individual, and had been driven home and kissed by this same individual. The co-respondent to Mrs Briginshaw was the individual she had attended the dance with, who denied that adultery had occurred.

=== Supreme Court trial ===
Martin J in the Supreme Court of Victoria evaluated the initial evidence at the standard of beyond reasonable doubt, and at that standard found insufficient evidence to support the allegation of adultery.

== High Court appeal ==
Mr Briginshaw was granted special leave to appeal to the High Court against the judgement of the Supreme Court.

=== Pleadings ===
This appeal was pleaded on the grounds that:

1. the judge had wrongly decided he needed to be satisfied at the beyond reasonable doubt standard, before making a finding that adultery had occurred;
2. the judge's reasons showed he would have made that finding if the balance of probabilities standard had been applied;
3. he should have been so satisfied, or
4. a new hearing should take place.

All submissions relied upon the plaintiff's contention that the balance of probabilities should have been the standard to apply.

=== Judgment ===
The court found that divorce matters were within the court's civil jurisdiction, with the standard of proof to be determined by statutory interpretation.

The applicable statute was the Marriage Act 1928 (VIC), which relevantly stated: "upon any petition for dissolution of marriage it shall be the duty of the Court to satisfy itself so far as it reasonably can as to the facts" and "if the Court is satisfied ... it shall pronounce a decree".

The court held that in a civil jurisdiction the word 'satisfied' did not mean proof 'beyond reasonable doubt', but something lower. However, by majority the court held that the primary judge's reasons did not indicate that he would have found in favour of the plaintiff even if he had evaluated the evidence at that lower standard. Therefore the appeal was dismissed.

=== The Briginshaw principle ===
In a passage often cited by subsequent courts, Justice Dixon stated what has since become known as the Briginshaw principle, writing:

Except upon criminal issues to be proved by the prosecution, it is enough that the affirmative of an allegation is made out to the reasonable satisfaction of the tribunal. But reasonable satisfaction is not a state of mind that is attained or established independently of the nature and consequence of the fact or facts to be proved. The seriousness of an allegation made, the inherent unlikelihood of an occurrence of a given description, or the gravity of the consequences flowing from a particular finding are considerations which must affect the answer to the question whether the issue has been proved to the reasonable satisfaction of the tribunal. In such matters “reasonable satisfaction” should not be produced by inexact proofs, indefinite testimony, or indirect inferences. Everyone must feel that, when, for instance, the issue is on which of two dates an admitted occurrence took place, a satisfactory conclusion may be reached on materials of a kind that would not satisfy any sound and prudent judgment if the question was whether some act had been done involving grave moral delinquency.

Justice Rich said of the standard of proof: 'In a serious matter like a charge of adultery, the satisfaction of a just and prudent mind could not be produced by slender and exiguous proofs or circumstances pointing with a wavering finger to an affirmative conclusion'.

The decisions culminate in what is now known and referred to as the Briginshaw principle. It essentially means that the more serious an allegation, the more substantial the evidence that may be required in order to prove such allegation on the balance of probabilities. The decision did not set a new standard of evidence, but rather provided guidance on how such a standard ought be reached.

== Significance ==
The Briginshaw principle has since been enacted in Australia's uniform evidence law. For example, s140(2)(c) of the Evidence Act 1995 (NSW) sets out 'gravity of the matters alleged' as a relevant consideration for proving a case on the balance of probabilities; a subsumption of the Briginshaw principle.

The principle has been applied in civil cases relating to anti-discrimination and sexual harassment, due to the relative seriousness of those types of civil allegations. It has been argued by academic Loretta De Plevitz that tribunals have misunderstood the Briginshaw principle as establishing an additional standard of proof, rather than as articulating a nuance subsumed within the balance of probabilities standard. In the judicial context, similar remarks have been made by Justice Heerey in 2008.

Briginshaw was seen to import a certain degree of flexibility into the civil standard of proof. The High Court in Neat v Karajan Holdings stated:

The ordinary standard of proof required of a party who bears the onus in civil litigation in this country is proof on the balance of probabilities. That remains so even where the matter to be proved involves criminal conduct or fraud. On the other hand, the strength of the evidence necessary to establish a fact or facts on the balance of probabilities may vary according to the nature of what it is sought to prove. Thus, authoritative statements have often been made to the effect that clear or cogent or strict proof is necessary ‘where so serious a matter as fraud is to be found’. Statements to that effect should not, however, be understood as directed to the standard of proof. Rather, they should be understood as merely reflecting a conventional perception that members of our society do not ordinarily engage in fraudulent or criminal conduct and a judicial approach that a court should not lightly make a finding that, on the balance of probabilities, a party to civil litigation has been guilty of such conduct.

— Mason CJ, Brennan, Deane and Gaudron JJ at para. (2)

Justice Rachel Pepper has subsequently stated: "put simply ... Briginshaw should be seen as not as a standard of proof, but as a standard of satisfaction. That is to say, that the more serious the allegation, the more serious or anxious should be the consideration given by the decision maker that he or she has attained the necessary state of reasonable satisfaction or persuasion that the facts in dispute are more likely than not to exist." In short, the more serious an allegation is, the evidence required must be of a similar probative or strong standard.

In a 2019 decision, the New South Wales Supreme Court held that application of the Briginshaw principle should be confined to cases involving serious allegations analogous to fraud or dishonesty. However in assessing the evidence, the matters in s 140(2) of the Evidence Act 1995 (NSW) remained applicable.

== See also ==
- No-fault divorce
- Ecclesiastical jurisdiction (Church of England)
