= Michael Zavros =

Australian artist

- Born: Michael Zavros; Brisbane, Australia
- Education: Queensland College of Art
- Known for: Painting
- Awards: Doug Moran National Portrait Prize; 2010 Phoebe is dead/McQueen Bulgari Art Award; 2012 The new Round Room
- Elected: Visual Arts and Craft Board of the Australia Council for the Arts
- Website: http://www.michaelzavros.com/

Michael Zavros is an Australian artist.

== Early life and education ==
Zavros studied printmaking at Queensland College of Art in the 1990s.

== Awards ==
Zavros has won three Australian drawing prizes: The Jacaranda Acquisitive Drawing Award in 2002, The Robert Jacks Drawing Prize in 2005 and the Kedumba Prize in 2007. In 2004, Zavros won the Primavera Collex award through the Museum of Contemporary Art, Sydney.

In 2010 Zavros won the Doug Moran National Portrait Prize with a portrait of his child Phoebe is Dead/McQueen. The previous year, Zavros was awarded runner up in the Doug Moran National Portrait Prize with a self-portrait entitled V12 Narcissus. In 2012 he won the inaugural Bulgari Art Award, which included the acquisition of his work The new Round Room by the Art Gallery of New South Wales.

In 2016 Zavros was the recipient of the Mosman Art Prize for a portrait of his daughter entitled Flora.

He was a finalist in the Archibald Prize in 2004, 2005, 2006, 2009, 2013 and 2022.

In 2026, Zavros won the Archibald Prize People's Choice award for Alex with his tefillin in the sea, a portrait of Alex Ryvchin that incorporates tefillin.

== Collections ==
Zavros has exhibited widely within Australia and his work is held in numerous private and public collections. His portrait of Quentin Bryce, Governor-General 2008–2014, hangs in the National Portrait Gallery, Canberra.

Pistol Grip (Ben Roberts-Smith VC), a portrait of Victoria Cross recipient Ben Roberts-Smith, hangs in the Australian War Memorial, Canberra.

== Other roles ==
From 2007 to 2011, Zavros served on the Visual Arts Board of the Australia Council for the Arts. He was on the board of NAVA (National Association for the Visual Arts) from 2014 to 2019.
