= Andrew Fowler (journalist) =

British Australian Journalist

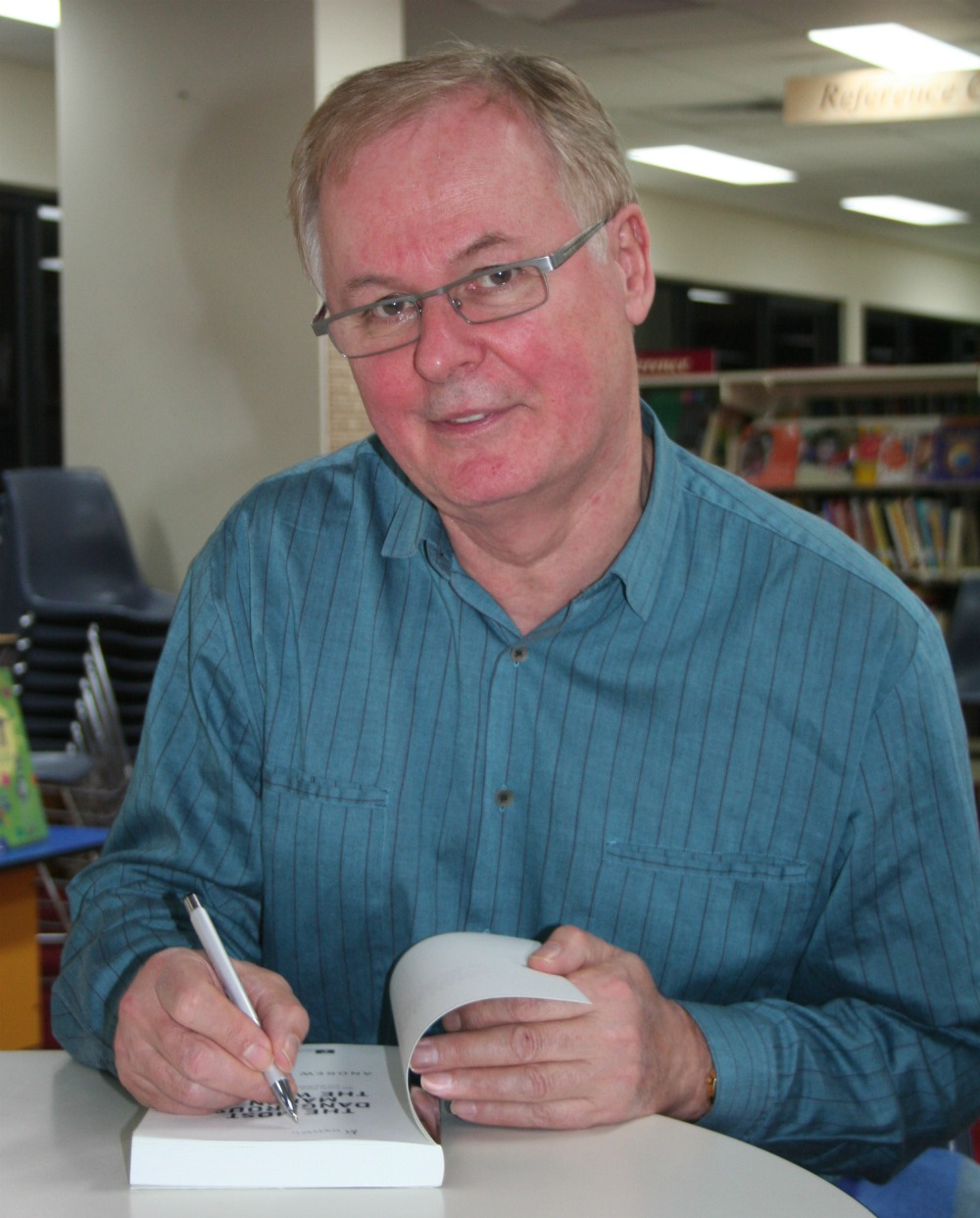
Fowler in 2011

Andrew John Fowler is an Australian TV reporter, author, and journalist. Born in the United Kingdom, he worked as a journalist in London before migrating to Australia. He specialises in human rights and national security issues.

== Reportage ==
=== Julian Assange and WikiLeaks ===
Fowler has reported extensively on the rise of WikiLeaks on ABC programs Four Corners and Foreign Correspondent and published the book, The Most Dangerous Man in the World: the inside story of WikiLeaks.

In 2013 Fowler reported for ABC's Four Corners on foreign hackers who had penetrated several Australian Government departments and defence manufacturing companies. The program, Hacked, revealed that the blueprint for the then new headquarters of Australia's domestic spy agency ASIO, had been discovered on an internet server based in China, thus potentially compromising the agency's security.

==== Personal views ====
Fowler is critical of the rising power of executive government. He sees the prosecution of Julian Assange as a political attack on journalism and an attempt to intimidate all journalists from their central role of holding governments to account.

=== South Africa ===
In 1993 Fowler reported on South Africa's transition to democracy after the release of Nelson Mandela.

For ABC's Foreign Correspondent he exposed details of the allegations that then South African President Jacob Zuma had been bribed by the French arms manufacturer, Thales.

In Somalia he reported on the kidnapping by pirates of tourists on the French ship Le Ponant and their subsequent release.

=== The Australian Liberal Party’s attack on Paul Keating ===
In 2001 he reported an expose of a Liberal Party dirty tricks attempt to discredit former Labor Prime Minister Paul Keating.

It was widely reported that the broadcast of the program – Party Tricks - was delayed by the ABC's managing director Jonathan Shier, an ex-Liberal party staffer who was strongly critical of its contents. It was eventually broadcast unchanged.

=== Other stories ===
Fowler covered the former Soviet Union’s move to a market economy under Mikhail Gorbachev’s Perestroika and Glasnost and the overthrow of Manuel Noriega in Panama. In 1987 he covered the Iran-Iraq War and the Contra-Gate affair.

In 2009 Fowler exposed the details of the unexplained death of a mining magnate and his shadowy relationship with a west Australian entrepreneur for the Four Corners report Dirty Business.

== Career ==
Fowler started his career in journalism as a reporter on the Mid-Sussex Times and later moved to the London Evening News where he covered the IRA bombing campaign. In 1976 he moved to Australia where he worked as a reporter for News Limited newspaper, before becoming chief of staff of The Australian and later Acting Foreign Editor.

Fowler went on to work as a reporter for Channel 7, SBS TV's Dateline, ABC’s Lateline program, and the ABC flagship investigative program Four Corners.

In 2002 Fowler was appointed head of the ABC’s Investigative Unit, reporting stories for radio's AM and PM, programs, and ABC TV's 7.30 Report, Foreign Correspondent and Four Corners.

Since leaving the ABC in 2013 Fowler has published a number of books, on journalism and national security. He has also published stories in The Guardian and The Sydney Morning Herald, The Monthly and has been interviewed several times on the ABC, the BBC and France24 TV discussing WikiLeaks, journalism and national security issues. Fowler is a critic of AUKUS.

== Books published ==
- The Most Dangerous Man in the World: Julian Assange and the inside story on WikiLeaks (Melbourne University Press, 2011, 2012)
- The War on Journalism: Media Moguls, Whistleblowers and the Price of Freedom (Random House, 2015)
- Shooting the Messenger: Criminalising Journalism (Routledge UK)
- Secret Australia (Monash University Publishing, 2020) – contributor.
- (New edition) The Most Dangerous Man in the World: Julian Assange and WikiLeaks Fight for Freedom (Melbourne University Press, 2020)
- Journalism Ethics Handbook (Springer, 2021) – contributor.
- Nuked: The Submarine Fiasco that Sank Australia’s Sovereignty (Melbourne University Press, 2024)

== Awards ==
- 1983 UN Peace Prize for documentary on US most decorated soldier turned anti-nuclear campaigner, Col. David Hackworth.(Channel 7, Australia)
- 1983 Penguin Award by Television Society of Australia for excellence in broadcasting for Col. David Hackworth documentary. (Channel 7, Australia)
- 2002 Logie and Walkley finalist, Party Tricks, (Four Corners)
- 2002 Human Rights Commission Award for investigation into failure of mental health service in NSW (Four Corners)
- 2010 Gold World Medal New York Festivals, Truth or Dare, the rise of WikiLeaks (Foreign Correspondent)
- 2015 – Walkley Book Award finalist, The War on Journalism: Media Moguls, Whistleblowers and the Price of Freedom (Random House)
- 2024 – Walkley Book Award winner, Nuked: The Submarine Fiasco that Sank Australia's Sovereignty (Melbourne University Press)
- 2025 – Australian Political Book of the Year, shortlisted for Nuked
