= Chip Le Grand =

Australian journalist

- Born: Homer Eugene Le Grand, V
- Education: University in Melbourne
- Occupations: Journalist, author
- Writing career
- Years active: c. 1989–present
- Period: c. 1989–present
- Genre: Non-fiction
- Subjects: Australian Politics, Crime, Sports, Current Events
- Notable awards: Walkley Book Award (2015, for The Straight Dope); William Hill Australian Sports Book of the Year (2015); June Andrews Award for Arts Journalism (2022)

Chip Le Grand (born Homer Eugene Le Grand, V) is an Australian journalist who lives in Melbourne. He worked for 25 years for The Australian newspaper, writing about national affairs, sport, politics and crime. In August 2019, he joined The Age newspaper as its chief reporter.

He is the winner of the Walkley Book Award for The Straight Dope, the inside story of the Essendon and Cronulla doping scandals, published in 2015 by Melbourne University Publishing.

His writing was included in an anthology of sports newspaper writing, The Best Australian Sports Writing, 2002.

Although his 2022 book Lockdown about Australia's response to the COVID-19 pandemic garnered substantial reviews in major Australian publications, Le Grand concedes that “Few people bought it and fewer still read it.” He was awarded the June Andrews Award for Arts Journalism in 2022 for his reviews for The Age and The Sydney Morning Herald.

== Bibliography ==
=== Books ===
- Le Grand, Chip (2015). The straight dope : the inside story of sport's biggest drug scandal. Carlton, Vic.: Melbourne University Press.
- — (2022). Lockdown. Clayton, Vic.: Monash University Publishing.

=== Critical studies and reviews of Le Grand's work ===
Lockdown

- Jack, David (October 2022). "Radical policy prescriptions : the paternalism at the heart of lockdowns". Australian Book Review. 447: 14–15.
