= Strength of evidence =

Strength that can be assessed in health care interventions

In biostatistics, strength of evidence is the strength of a conducted study that can be assessed in health care interventions, e.g. to identify effective health care programs and evaluate the quality of the research in health care. It can be graded with different descriptive or analytical statistical methods. Hierarchy of study design, for example using a case-study, ecological study, cross-sectional, case-control, cohort, or experimental, although not always in this order is a general rule to a high "strength of evidence" of a clinical study.
