= Nick McKenzie =

Australian investigative journalist

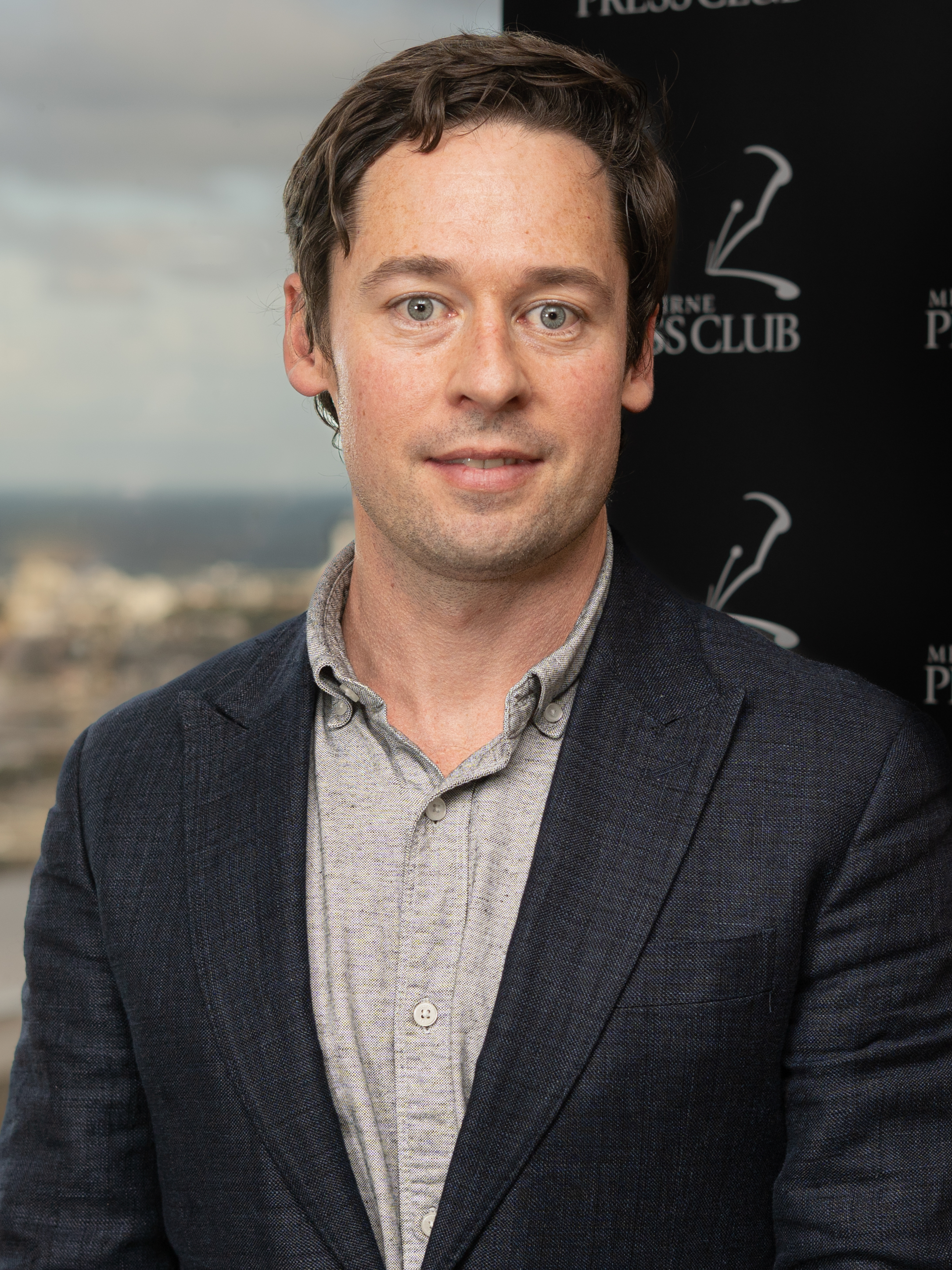
- McKenzie in June 2022
- Occupation: Investigative journalist
- Website: NickMcKenzie.com.au

Nick McKenzie ı̇s an Australian investigative journalist. He is known for his work uncovering corruption in politics, business, foreign affairs and defence, human rights issues, policing, and criminal justice. He works for Melbourne's The Age, The Sydney Morning Herald and The Australian Financial Review, and has also reported for the Australian Broadcasting Corporation's Four Corners and Nine's 60 Minutes.

His reporting has led to a number of government inquiries and police investigations, including a federal police probe into political donations linked to alleged mafia figures. In June 2023, McKenzie and colleague Chris Masters won what was described as the "defamation trial of the century", a federal court lawsuit brought by decorated soldier Ben Roberts-Smith. A judge ruled against Roberts-Smith, as what the journalists had reported was substantially true. In 2026 Roberts-Smith was charged with war crimes in Afghanistan.

As of November 2026 McKenzie has won 22 Walkley Awards, been named twice as Graham Perkin Australian Journalist of the Year, and received the Kennedy Award for Journalist of the Year in 2020 and 2022. He is a former president and life member of the Melbourne Press Club.

== Early life and education ==
McKenzie's mother and grandparents are Polish Jews who migrated to Australia when his mother was 15. His grandparents were both Holocaust survivors. McKenzie's mother's extended family were killed in Nazi gas chambers. He is a twin.

McKenzie graduated from RMIT University, Melbourne, with a Bachelor of Arts (Journalism) in 2001. He also holds a Master's degree in International Politics from the University of Melbourne.

== Journalism career ==
McKenzie began his career as a cadet journalist at the Australian Broadcasting Corporation, later joining Fairfax Media (publisher of The Age and The Sydney Morning Herald). He became known for his work uncovering corruption in politics, business, foreign affairs and defence, human rights issues, policing, and criminal justice.

=== Terrorism ===
In 2005, he interviewed Australian terrorist leader Abdul Nacer Benbrika before Benbrika was prosecuted for leading terror cells in Sydney and Melbourne. During Benbrika's court case, the public prosecutor told the court that Benbrika was covertly recorded by authorities claiming that he had threatened McKenzie, telling him to "watch yourself", and that he knew how to find the reporter.

=== Corruption ===
In 2009, McKenzie and colleague Richard Baker investigated foreign bribery involving Reserve Bank of Australia subsidiaries. The report led to Australia's first-ever foreign bribery prosecution in 2011 and guilty pleas from RBA firms Securency and Note Printing Australia. McKenzie and Baker were awarded a Walkley Award for Investigative Reporting for their investigation, which also led to the governor of the Reserve Bank, Glenn Stevens, testifying before a Senate committee to respond to allegations the bank mishandled the scandal.

In 2010, McKenzie and investigative reporters Ben Schneiders and Royce Millar revealed political parties were storing personal information about voters, raising privacy concerns. The three were later charged with numerous counts of unauthorised access to data. They subsequently admitted responsibility for the database access as part of a court diversion program, avoiding a conviction. The trio's barrister said there was a public interest in whether political parties should maintain such data and that investigative journalists provide "genuine service to this community". The Age published a news article acknowledging the unlawful conduct, while editor-in-chief Andrew Holden defended the reporting, stating investigative journalists needed to report public interest stories.

In 2012, McKenzie's reporting on corruption and organised crime within the Australian Customs and Border Protection Service Service was recognised with a Walkley Award. The reporting led to reforms of the Australian Customs Service announced in 2013 by home affairs minister Jason Clare and overseen by former NSW judge James Wood. In 2012 McKenzie obtained confidential Victoria Police files documenting the suicides of at least 40 people sexually abused by Catholic clergy in Victoria. Victorian premier Ted Baillieu immediately called a parliamentary inquiry into abuse allegations by religious clergy.

In 2014, a report co-authored by McKenzie on an undisclosed multi-million dollar payment to Hong Kong chief executive CY Leung from Australian company UGL prompted widespread calls for Leung's resignation and sparked an investigation by Hong Kong authorities. In 2016, McKenzie and Baker revealed the Unaoil oil industry corruption scandal that implicated some of the world's biggest oil industry firms, including Rolls-Royce, ABB, Petrofac and Halliburton in alleged corruption involving a Monaco firm called Unaoil. In 2019, two members of the family which runs Unaoil pleaded guilty to bribery and corruption offences in the United States.

In July 2019, McKenzie presented Crown Unmasked detailing corporate misconduct involving Crown Resorts, including allegations Crown was working with casino junket operators owned by Hong Kong's triads. The investigation also reported that wealthy Chinese gamblers "were offered help securing immigration to Australia, their children's schooling in Australia and property investments in Melbourne and Sydney". Crown attacked the reporting in advertisements. Crown's chairwoman Helen Coonan in 2020 told a commission of inquiry into Crown's suitability to hold a gaming licence that the advertisement contained significant errors. The Australian Criminal Intelligence Commission also opened probes into the money laundering allegations.

On 14 June 2020, McKenzie's reporting for The Age and Nine Network's 60 Minutes Australia released covert recordings purporting to show cabinet minister and Australian Labor Party power broker Adem Somyurek organising branch stacking. Somyurek is alleged to have registered local party members with false details, taking funds from business owners to pay for party membership fees, and directing ministerial staffers to engage in wrongdoing. Included in the numerous covert recordings are several sections where Somyurek is heard making derogatory comments towards MPs Gabrielle Williams and Marlene Kairouz and ministerial staffers, which have been described as sexist and homophobic.

"This is going to be relentless; we're just going to go fuck them. We're just going to go to town. This is fucking war. We've got fucking massive numbers, we've got about thirty going in every week..."

—, Covert audio recording of Somyurek

On 15 June 2020, premier Daniel Andrews sacked Somyurek from his cabinet and referred Somyurek's conduct to the Independent Broad-based Anti-corruption Commission for further investigation. Andrews also wrote to the National Executive of the Australian Labor Party to seek the termination of Somyurek's party membership. Later that day, the Labor Party's national president, Wayne Swan, confirmed that Somyurek had resigned his membership and there would "never be a place for Somyurek in the ALP ever again".

=== Sports ===
A 2012 interview McKenzie conducted with sports scientist Steven Dank was used by the Australian Sports Anti-Doping Authority in its controversial doping case against the Essendon Football Club.

=== Disability care ===
In 2014, a news story by McKenzie on Four Corners into abuse in disability care homes led to a Victorian Ombudsman inquiry and a federal senate inquiry, which recommended a royal commission that was later announced by the Morrison government.

=== Foreign interference ===
His 2017 Four Corners documentary program "Power and Influence" reported that ASIO had warned Australian political parties about receiving donations from two men, billionaires Huang Xiangmo and Chau Chak Wing. It also reported that former Trade Minister Andrew Robb had been hired on a A$880,000 yearly consultancy by a company closely linked to the Chinese government. The story was a catalyst for Australia's controversial counter foreign interference laws and later led to the resignation of senator Sam Dastyari over his dealings with Huang. Huang was expelled from Australia by ASIO on security grounds, but denied the allegations about him, while Wing commenced defamation proceedings.

=== War crimes ===
In 2017, McKenzie and veteran reporter Chris Masters produced several reports detailing allegations that Australia's special forces committed war crimes in Afghanistan. They reported that Victoria Cross recipient Ben Roberts-Smith was under investigation by the federal police and the military inspector general. Roberts-Smith attacked the claims as unfounded and sued McKenzie and Masters for defamation.

The trial began in Sydney in June 2021 and was named by media outlets as the "defamation trial of the century". Justice Anthony Besanko presided over the civil trial. It was the first time an Australian court had assessed allegations of war crimes by Australian forces. The trial lasted 110 days and cost an estimated $30 million. In June 2023, the case against McKenzie and Masters was dismissed after Besanko ruled that four of the six murder allegations—all of which were denied by Roberts-Smith—were substantially true. Besanko found the newspaper had not proven two of the murder allegations; however, it also found that Roberts-Smith's "reputation has been lowered so far... that two unproven allegations of battlefield murder weren't enough to defame him".

The Afghanistan Human Rights and Democracy Organisation praised the investigative journalism for "uncovering the truth and raising public awareness" about the war crimes allegations.

In April 2026 Roberts-Smith was charged with war crimes.

== Shield laws ==
In a 2013 court case brought by Helen Liu, a political donor, in the Supreme Court of New South Wales, three journalists including McKenzie made an application to keep their sources confidential, but could not rely on shield laws as they hadn't been introduced. Justice Lucy McCallum ruled a journalist's pledge to keep a source confidential "is not a right or an end in itself" and could be overridden "in the interests of justice". The journalists agreed that they would not use a defence of qualified privilege, meaning Liu could pursue them, but not their sources. Liu dropped the lawsuit in 2017 with no sources being disclosed.

In 2015, McKenzie defeated a Victorian Supreme Court application brought by an alleged mafia figure for disclosure of his sources in the first legal test of Victoria's journalist shield laws. The case was described by the ABC's Media Watch program as a landmark test of source protection. The court ruled that identifying McKenzie's sources would jeopardise their safety, that there was a strong public interest in reporting on the mafia's infiltration of politics and that there would be a chilling effect if disclosure was granted. The Australian journalists' union, the MEAA, described the decision as "important for public interest journalism," but other reporting suggested shield laws "are still far from satisfactory". In his ruling, Supreme Court Justice John Dixon found that it was reasonable for police to suspect the alleged mafia figure placed a $200,000 hit on the suspected newspaper source.

In 2016, the alleged mafia boss discontinued his defamation lawsuit against The Age. The legal action concerned a series of articles that described him as a mafia boss involved in murder, extortion, and drug trafficking. The Age subsequently published an apology, noting the man had never been charged by police; however, it did not retract its reports identifying him as the head of the Calabrian mafia.

In 2017, the ABC reached a confidential settlement with the president of the Chinese Students and Scholars Association. This followed her appearance in a Four Corners program, reported by McKenzie, which investigated the influence of the Chinese Communist Party within Australian politics and universities. The president had demanded an apology, which was refused. Instead, Four Corners added an editor's note to the program's transcript.

== Awards and recognition ==
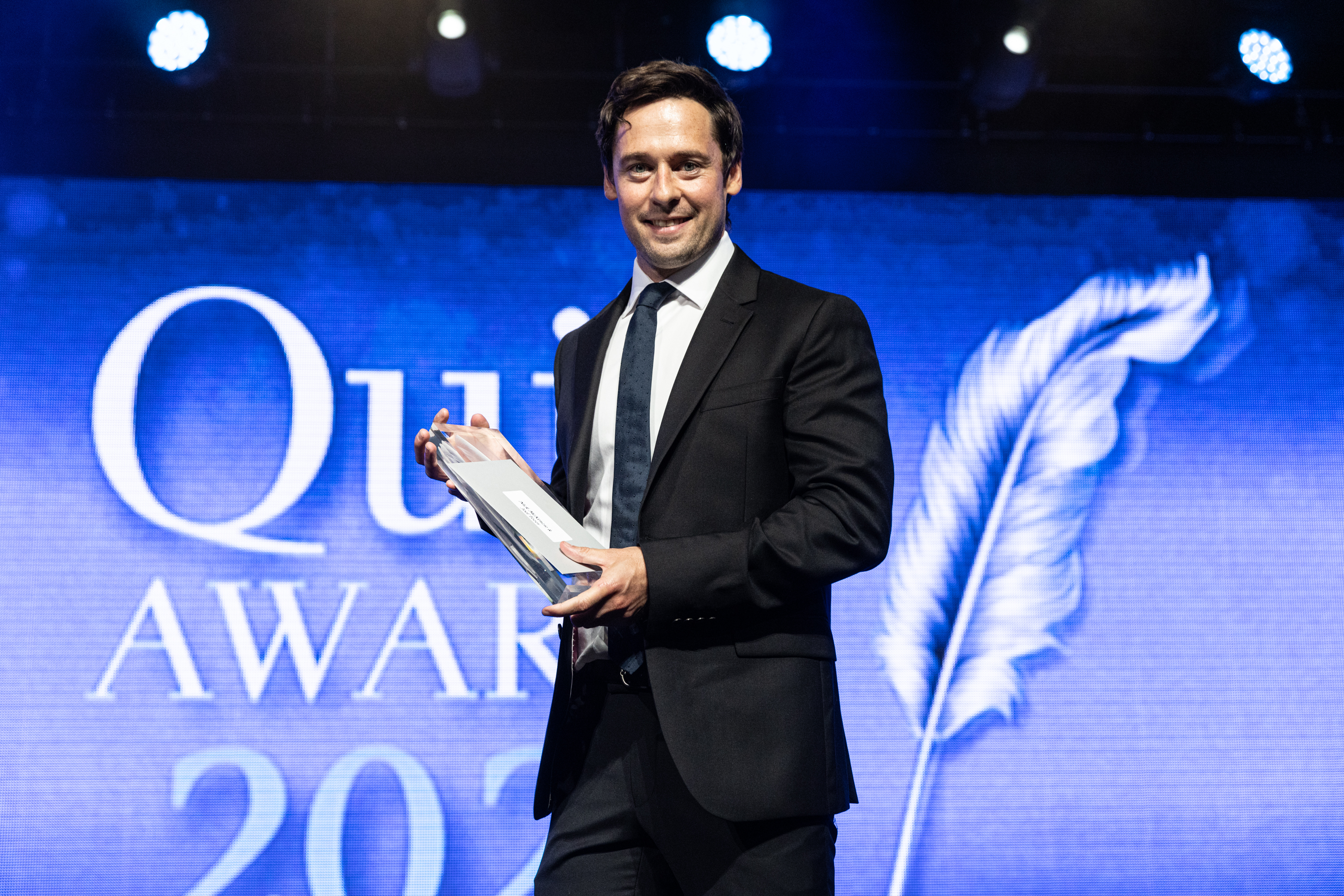
McKenzie accepts the Melbourne Press Club Grant Hattam Quill for Investigative Journalism in March 2022.

McKenzie has won Australia's top journalism award, the Walkley Award, twenty times. In 2010, McKenzie and colleague Richard Baker won the Australian Centre for Independent Journalism's George Munster prize. In 2012, McKenzie and Baker were rated the third most influential journalists or editors in Australia by news website Crikey.

In 2019, McKenzie won the Lowy Institute Media Award for reporting on foreign interference in Australia. McKenzie has twice been named the Graham Perkin Australian Journalist of the Year, once alongside Baker (2017) and by himself in 2021.

In 2020, McKenzie was named the Kennedy Award's Journalist of the Year for his work exposing war crimes and corporate corruption. He won the award again in 2022. McKenzie is the most decorated journalist in the history of the Melbourne Press Club's Quill Awards and has twice won the press club's highest award, the Gold Quill. He was shortlisted for the 2023 Australian Political Book of the Year for Crossing the Line.

McKenzie is a former president and life member of the Melbourne Press Club.

=== Walkley Awards ===
The annual Walkley Awards, under the administration of the Walkley Foundation for Journalism, are presented in Australia to recognise and reward excellence in journalism. After winning two awards in the 2026 edition of the awards, McKenzie had won a total of 22 awards. These include:

- 2004 Walkley Award for Radio/Audio Current Affairs, co-winner with Rafael Epstein, for the episodes on police corrupon on the ABC Radio programs PM and AM, ABC
- 2008 Walkley for Sport News Reporting, for exposing organised crime and race fixing in Australian racing, in his article "Mokbel's Day at the Races" in The Age
- 2011 Walkley for exposing corporate misconduct and bribery linked to the Reserve Bank
- 2013 Walkley for doping in the Australian Football League
- 2013 Walkley for exposing corruption in the Australian Border Force
- 2014 Walkley for exposing corruption in the construction industry and union movement
- 2019 Walkley for exposing organised crime and foreign interference linked to Australia's biggest gaming company, Crown Resorts
- 2020 Walkley for Television, Video: Current Affairs (long), co-winner with Joel Tozer and Sumeyya Ilabey, for exposing misconduct in 60 Minutes investigation "The Faceless Man", about Labor factional leader and Victorian cabinet minister Adem Somyurek
- 2023 Walkley for Media Freedom to recognise his Ben Roberts-Smith stories from 2018 to 2023.
- 2026 Gold Walkley, for his investigation into Victorian crime figure Mick Gatto, and the Victorian Government's lack of control over the wrongdoing on its infrastructure program, "Big Build"
- 2026 Walkley for Investigative Journalism, for the Gatto / Victorian Government story

== Works ==
In 2012, McKenzie's book The Sting was published by Melbourne University Publishing (MUP) under its Victory Books imprint. The "based-on-real-life-events" story details how a team of Australian Federal Police ran an undercover money-laundering sting. Their operation successfully identified the Grandfather Syndicate, a global drug empire controlled by triads, and got closer to dismantling it than any law enforcement group had before. Helen Crompton's review in The West Australian described McKenzie's book as a "crack-ing yarn".

McKenzie has contributed to the Australian journalism textbooks, Australian Journalism Today (2012) and The Best Australian Business Writing (2012).

In 2023, McKenzie book Crossing the Line was published by Hachette Australia. The book is his account of investigating the war crimes allegations against Ben Roberts-Smith and the subsequent defamation trial. In her review, Bridget Brooklyn from the University of Western Sydney wrote that the book "delivers a coherent and absorbing account of this shocking story" and that it is "a story that, after all the media coverage that made it so familiar, is one worth telling and worth reading".
