= Roberts-Smith v Fairfax Media Publications Pty Limited =

Legal case heard in the Federal Court of Australia

- Court: Federal Court of Australia
- Full case name: Roberts-Smith v Fairfax Media Publications Pty Limited (No 41)
- Started: 2020
- Decided: June 1, 2023
- Citation: [2023] FCA 555

Case history
- Subsequent action: Applicant appealed decision

Ruling
- The proceedings be dismissed

Court membership
- Judge sitting: Anthony Besanko

Keywords
- Defamation

Roberts-Smith v Fairfax Media Publications Pty Limited is a 2023 decision of the Federal Court of Australia in defamation proceedings brought by former Australian soldier Ben Roberts-Smith against several newspaper publishers and journalists. The proceedings concerned articles published in 2018 alleging that Roberts-Smith had committed unlawful killings and other misconduct whilst serving in Afghanistan. Justice Anthony Besanko dismissed the case in June 2023, finding that, although the publications conveyed defamatory imputations, the respondents had successfully established the defences of substantial truth and contextual truth. The Court found, on the balance of probabilities, that Roberts-Smith had committed, or was complicit in or responsible for, the murders of four Afghan men during three military operations. These were findings in civil proceedings, rather than criminal convictions.

The trial ran for 110 days at an estimated cost of A$25,000,000 and became the second longest defamation trial in Australian legal history.

The decision was upheld by the Full Court of the Federal Court of Australia in May 2025 and the High Court of Australia refused special leave to appeal in September 2025.

== Background ==
Born and raised in Western Australia, Roberts-Smith joined the Australian Army in 1996 when he was eighteen. In 2003 he was posted to the Western Australian-based Special Air Service Regiment (SASR). During his time with the SASR, Roberts-Smith deployed to Afghanistan on six occasions. In 2006 he was awarded the Medal for Gallantry for his actions as a patrol scout and sniper.

Roberts-Smith was awarded the Victoria Cross for Australia in 2011 for his actions during Operation Slipper, the Australian contribution to the war in Afghanistan. The citation for his Victoria Cross states Roberts-Smith initiated an assault on an enemy fortification. During the assault, Roberts-Smith "knowingly and willingly exposed his position in order to draw fire" and later "with total disregard for his own safety ... stormed two enemy machine gun positions killing both machine gun teams."

In 2017, allegations arose claiming SASR personnel in Afghanistan committed murder and other war crimes. The Inspector General of the Australian Defence Force commissioned an inquiry into the allegation. The subsequent report – commonly known as the Brereton Report – found evidence of multiple unlawful killings by Australian Defence Force personnel between 2009 and 2013.

In 2018, Australian journalists Nick McKenzie, Chris Masters and David Wroe named Roberts-Smith as one of the persons alleged to have committed war crimes in Afghanistan.

== Trial ==
The Court found the following inferences regarding Roberts-Smith substantially true: (Note: These are not criminal charges or convictions, but instead findings of a civil suit.)

- He is a criminal who broke the moral and legal rules of military engagement.
- He murdered an Afghan man by kicking him off a cliff and then directing men under his command to shoot him.
- In order to "blood" a new soldier under his command, he forced the soldier to kill an unarmed Afghan man.
- He murdered a man with a prosthetic leg with a machine gun. He then took the leg as a war trophy and encouraged other soldiers to use it as a drinking vessel.
- He authorised the execution of an unarmed Afghan by another soldier.
- He assaulted other unarmed Afghans on multiple occasions.
- He bullied a fellow soldier, including threatening violence.

== Subsequent action ==
Roberts-Smith appealed on several grounds to the Full Court of the Federal Court of Australia (FCFCA) after the dismissal. The FCFCA upheld the original decision and dismissed the appeals with costs on 16 May 2025.

The High Court of Australia refused to grant special leave to appeal on 4 September 2025. The Court stated the appeal raised no question of legal principle and had insufficient prospects of success.

== Subsequent criminal proceedings ==
On 7 April 2026, Roberts-Smith was arrested by the Australian Federal Police at Sydney Airport. He was subsequently charged with five counts of war crime murder (Note: In Australian law, war crime murder is defined as: 268.70 War crime—murder (1) A person (the perpetrator) commits an offence if: (a) the perpetrator causes the death of one or more persons; and (b) the person or persons are neither taking an active part in the hostilities nor are members of an organised armed group; and (c) the perpetrator knows of, or is reckless as to, the factual circumstances establishing that the person or persons are neither taking an active part in the hostilities nor are members of an organised armed group; and (d) the perpetrator’s conduct takes place in the context of, and is associated with, an armed conflict that is not an international armed conflict. Penalty: Imprisonment for life. (1A) Subsection (1) does not apply if: (a) the death of the person or persons occurs in the course of, or as a result of, an attack on a military objective; and (b) at the time the attack was launched: (i) the perpetrator did not expect that the attack would result in the incidental death of, or injury to, civilians that would have been excessive in relation to the concrete and direct military advantage anticipated; and (ii) it was reasonable in all the circumstances that the perpetrator did not have such an expectation. Note: A defendant bears an evidential burden in relation to the matter in subsection (1A). See subsection 13.3(3). (2) To avoid doubt, a reference in subsection (1) to a person or persons who are not taking an active part in the hostilities includes a reference to: (a) a person or persons who are hors de combat; or (b) civilians, medical personnel or religious personnel who are not taking an active part in the hostilities. (3) For the purposes of this section, the expression members of an organised armed group does not include members of an organised armed group who are hors de combat.) under section 268.70(1) of the Criminal Code Act 1995 (three charges of aid, abet, counsel, or procure an offence, one charge of actual offence and one charge of joint commission to an offence) with a maximum potential sentence of life imprisonment. He was remanded to the Silverwater Correctional Complex to appear before the online bail court on 8 April. No application for bail was made, and the matter was subsequently adjourned until 4 June.
