= Chris Masters (writer) =

Australian journalist and author

Christopher Wayne Masters PSM (born 4 December 1948 in Grafton, New South Wales) is a multiple Walkley Award–winning and Logie Award–winning Australian journalist and author.

== Life ==
Masters was born in Grafton, New South Wales. He is the fourth son of Charles Masters and the journalist and author Olga Masters and the brother of rugby league coach and journalist Roy Masters, filmmaker Quentin Masters, radio broadcaster Ian Masters and media producers Sue Masters and Deb Masters.

Masters was educated at Macquarie Boys High School, Parramatta, completing his Leaving Certificate in 1965. He joined the Australian Broadcasting Corporation the following year.

He commenced working on ABC television's flagship public affairs program Four Corners in 1983 and has since become the program's longest serving reporter. His first program was the landmark "Big League", a 1983 investigation of judicial corruption, which helped bring about the Street Royal Commission.

He is a Gold Walkley Award winner, for his 1985 Four Corners report "French Connections" about the sinking of the Rainbow Warrior. Another Four Corners report by Masters, "The Moonlight State" from 1987, led to the Fitzgerald Inquiry into corruption in Queensland.

== Degrees and honours ==
In 2004, he was appointed adjunct professor in Journalism with the School of Applied Communication at RMIT University and in 2006, RMIT awarded Masters an honorary doctorate in Communications.

Masters was awarded the Public Service Medal on 14 June 1999 and the Centenary Medal on 1 January 2001 for "service to Australian society in journalism".

He is on the national board of directors of the children's cancer charity RedKite.

Jonestown won the 2007 Queensland Premier's Literary Awards Literary Work Advancing Public Debate – the Harry Williams Award. It also won the 2007 Walkley Book Award for the best non-fiction book.

No Front Line: Australia's Special Forces At War in Afghanistan was shortlisted for the 2018 Walkley Book Award.

Flawed Hero: Truth, lies and war crimes won the 2024 Australian Political Book of the Year award.

== Writing ==
Masters has written four books. His first Inside Story, published in 1992, told of the stories behind some of his Four Corners programs. His second, Not for Publication, published in 2002, again dealt with his television work. His third book was called Jonestown and finally a book about the Australian soldier called Uncommon Soldier. Masters' work also played a key role in bringing down Ben Roberts-Smith.

=== Jonestown: The Power and the Myth of Alan Jones ===
In 2002, Masters profiled radio personality Alan Jones for an episode of Four Corners, and then went on to write a biography titled Jonestown: The Power and the Myth of Alan Jones. On 29 June 2006, ABC Enterprises decided to cancel publication of Masters' manuscript; ABC Enterprises director Robyn Watts stated that publication was being withdrawn because it would "almost certainly result in commercial loss, which would be irresponsible". This was widely believed to be a veiled reference to the fact that Jones's lawyers had threatened an expensive defamation lawsuit if the book reached publication. ABC program Media Watch reported that the decision to cancel publication had been made not by ABC Enterprises but by the ABC Board. Many ABC personalities have criticised the Board's decision, and indeed wrote a petition against it, with signatories including Richard Glover and Phillip Adams.

Mike Carlton, a Sydney radio broadcaster and rival to Jones, suggested on 2UE during his show of 5 July 2006 that the book might detail homosexual encounters on Jones's part, and Jones's lawyers had told the ABC that Masters' materials were "replete with false and inappropriate sexual innuendo". Indeed, in Jonestown, Masters advances the theory that Jones's attempt to deny his sexuality is a defining feature of his personality, and that it provides an explanation for many aspects of his behaviour, including, for example, his interest in mentoring young male athletes. His explanation of much about Jones by reference to his sexuality left Masters open to charges of homophobia, which friendly commentators (in an ironic effort to defend Jones's reputation) have exploited.

The ABC's refusal to publish the book did not delay it for long; Masters had little difficulty in finding publishers willing to take it on, and Allen & Unwin released it in October 2006. Lengthy excerpts were also published in The Sydney Morning Herald.

=== Ben Roberts-Smith investigation ===
With investigative help from Nick McKenzie and sustained support by Nine Network, Masters spent more than seven years investigating and reporting on Victoria Cross winner Ben Roberts-Smith. Roberts-Smith filed defamation suits against The Sydney Morning Herald, The Age and The Canberra Times after they reported he had murdered Afghans during multiple deployments to the country from 2006 to 2012. Roberts-Smith lost the case, with evidence clearly corroborating the work done by Masters and McKenzie.

In 2023, Masters published his full account of Robert-Smith's story in his book Flawed Hero. It was shortlisted for the 2024 Victorian Premier's Prize for Nonfiction.

== Bibliography ==
=== Books ===
- Inside Story (1992)
- Not for Publication (2002)
- Jonestown: The Power and the Myth of Alan Jones (2006)
- Uncommon Soldier: Brave, Compassionate and Tough, the Making of Australia's Modern Diggers (2013)
- No Front Line: Australia's Special Forces at War in Afghanistan (2017)
- Sticking to Our Guns: A Troubled Past Produces a Superb Weapon. Canberra: Australian Strategic Policy Institute. 2019.
- Flawed Hero: Truth, lies and war crimes (2023)

=== Essays and reporting ===
- Masters, Chris (March 2009). "Hidden Treasures: Forty-Three Years at the ABC". The Monthly. 43: 28–35.

=== Critical studies and reviews of Masters' work ===
No front line

- Pope, Alistair (January–February 2018). "With friends like this ..." Books, Arts & Life. Quadrant. 62 (1–2 [543]): 75–77.
