= Walkley Book Award =

Journalism award

The Walkley Book Award is an Australian award presented annually by the Walkley Foundation for excellence in long-form journalism and nonfiction, with subjects ranging from biography to true crime to investigative journalism and reporting.

== Winners ==
- 2005: Bob Connolly, Making Black Harvest
- 2006: Neil Chenoweth, Packer's Lunch: A Rollicking Tale of Swiss Bank Accounts and Money-Making
- 2007: Chris Masters, Jonestown: The Power and the Myth of Alan Jones
- 2008: Don Watson, American Journeys
- 2009: Graham Freudenberg, Churchill and Australia
- 2010: Shirley Shackleton, The Circle of Silence: A Personal Testimony Before, During and After Balibo
- 2011: Russell Skelton, King Brown Country: The Betrayal of Papunya
- 2012: George Megalogenis, The Australian Moment: How We Were Made for These Times
- 2013: Pamela Williams, Killing Fairfax: Packer, Murdoch and the Ultimate Revenge
- 2014: Paul Kelly, Triumph and Demise: The Broken Promise of a Labor Generation
- 2015: Chip Le Grand, The Straight Dope: The Inside Story of Sport's Biggest Drug Scandal
- 2016: Stan Grant, Talking to My Country
- 2017: Louise Milligan, Cardinal: The Rise and Fall of George Pell
- 2018: Helen Pitt, The House: The Dramatic Story of the Sydney Opera House and the People Who Made It
- 2019: Leigh Sales, Any Ordinary Day: Blindsides, Resilience and What Happens After the Worst Day of Your Life
- 2020: Lucie Morris-Marr, Fallen: The Inside Story of the Secret Trial and Conviction of Cardinal George Pell
- 2021: Kate Holden, The Winter Road
- 2022: Bronwyn Adcock, Currowan: The Story of a Fire and a Community During Australia's Worst summer
- 2023: Antony Loewenstein, The Palestine Laboratory: How Israel Exports the Technology of Occupation Around the World
- 2024: Andrew Fowler, Nuked: The Submarine Fiasco That Sank Australia's Sovereignty
- 2025: Rick Morton, Mean Streak: A moral vacuum, a dodgy debt generator and a multi-billion-dollar government shake down
