= Macquarie Boys Technology High School =

Macquarie Boys' Technology High School

Location
- Parramatta, Sydney, New South Wales; Australia; 33°48′18″S 151°01′32″E

Information
- Established: 1920s (as Parramatta Intermediate High School)
- Status: Closed
- Closed: 2010

Macquarie Boys' Technology High School was a high school for boys in Parramatta, New South Wales, Australia.

== History ==
The school opened in 1957 At the beginning of 2008, Years 7 through to 10 were discontinued, while remaining Year 11 and 12 students completed their NSW Higher School Certificate course.

== School closure ==
According to Nine News and The Daily Telegraph the school was to be shut down at the end of the 2009 school year because of major reputation problems throughout the school's history and the low numbers of students they had in 2007. This has subsequently been confirmed by the New South Wales Department of Education and Training.

== The future ==
The school was planned to be rejuvenated as the Lachlan Macquarie College, which was to begin operating on school grounds in January 2008. This new college was intended to specialise in Maths and Science. As of 2015, the Parramatta Sun reported that the University of Western Sydney decided not to take up the lease and turn the school into the Lachlan Macquarie College, leaving the buildings of this school to be overtaken with graffiti and vandalism as a result. The New South Wales Department of Education and Training was looking at selling the site, considered surplus to its needs.

All buildings on site were completely demolished in late August 2018 to make way for eleven residential and three commercial blocks, accommodating up to 6,200 people.

== Damage by fires ==
Late in the night of 23 July 2016, a "suspicious" fire ruined the school's vacant main hall. Fire fighters were able to control the spread of the fire, but the main building appeared to be completely destroyed. Officials issued a call for leads into who may have started the fire. On 20 May 2017, another fire occurred. On 27 April 2018, a small fire was lit in one of the first buildings.

== See also ==
- List of government schools in New South Wales
