= Substantial truth =

Legal doctrine

Substantial truth is a legal doctrine affecting libel and slander laws in common law jurisdictions such as the United States or the United Kingdom.

== United States law ==
Under the United States law, a statement cannot be held to be actionable as slanderous or libellous if the statement is true but has "slight inaccuracies of expression". That is not enough to make the alleged libel false.

== Other usage ==
This doctrine is applied in matters in which truth is used as an absolute defence to a defamation claim brought against a public figure, but only false statements made with "actual malice" are subject to sanctions. A defendant using truth as a defence in a defamation case is not required to justify every word of the alleged defamatory statements. It is sufficient to prove that "the substance, the gist, the sting, of the matter is true."
