= Inspector-General of the Australian Defence Force =

Australian office

Established under section 110B of the Defence Act 1903, the Inspector-General of the Australian Defence Force (IGADF) is a statutory office in the Australian Department of Defence with a range of roles relating to military justice in the Australian Defence Force (ADF). The office holder is appointed by the Minister for Defence and is independent of the ADF chain-of-command.

As of November 2024, the office-holder is James Gaynor, who has held office since 1 December 2016.

The IGADF was responsible for conducting the inquiry chaired by Major General Paul Brereton into possible breaches of the law of armed conflict by ADF personnel in the War in Afghanistan. The Brereton Report was released in November 2020.
