= Anthony Besanko =

Australian judge (born 1954)

The Honourable Justice Anthony Besanko

Judge of the Federal Court of Australia
- In office 3 April 2006 – 7 May 2024
- Appointed by: Philip Ruddock

Justice of the Supreme Court of the Australian Capital Territory
- Incumbent
- Assumed office March 2007

Chief Justice of the Supreme Court of Norfolk Island
- In office 26 February 2015 – 7 May 2024
- Preceded by: Peter Jacobson
- Succeeded by: Robert Bromwich

Judge of the Supreme Court of Norfolk Island
- Incumbent
- Assumed office 5 August 2013

Judge of the Supreme Court of South Australia
- In office 2001–2006

Personal details
- Born: 8 May 1954 (age 72)
- Education: University of Adelaide
- Occupation: Jurist

Anthony Besanko (born 8 May 1954) is an Australian jurist who served as a judge of the Federal Court of Australia from April 2006 to May 2024 and as the Chief Justice of the Supreme Court of Norfolk Island between February 2015 and May 2024. He has also served as additional judge in the ACT Supreme Court since March 2007.

From 1984 to 2001, he practiced as a barrister in South Australia, working in corporation and administration law and native title, and was president of the South Australian Bar Association from 2000 to 2001. From 2001 to 2006, he was a judge of the Supreme Court of South Australia.

In 2025, he joined Atkin Chambers as a door tenant.

== Roberts-Smith defamation proceedings ==
From 2021, Besanko presided over Ben Roberts-Smith's defamation proceedings against several major newspapers, dismissing the case on 1 June 2023. Roberts-Smith appealed to the Federal Court of Australia against Besanko's judgement, but he lost his appeal on 16 May 2025. Publication of the new judgment was held over until 20 May, for checking for security-sensitive information.
