= Andrew Hastie =

Australian politician (born 1982)

The Honourable Andrew Hastie MP
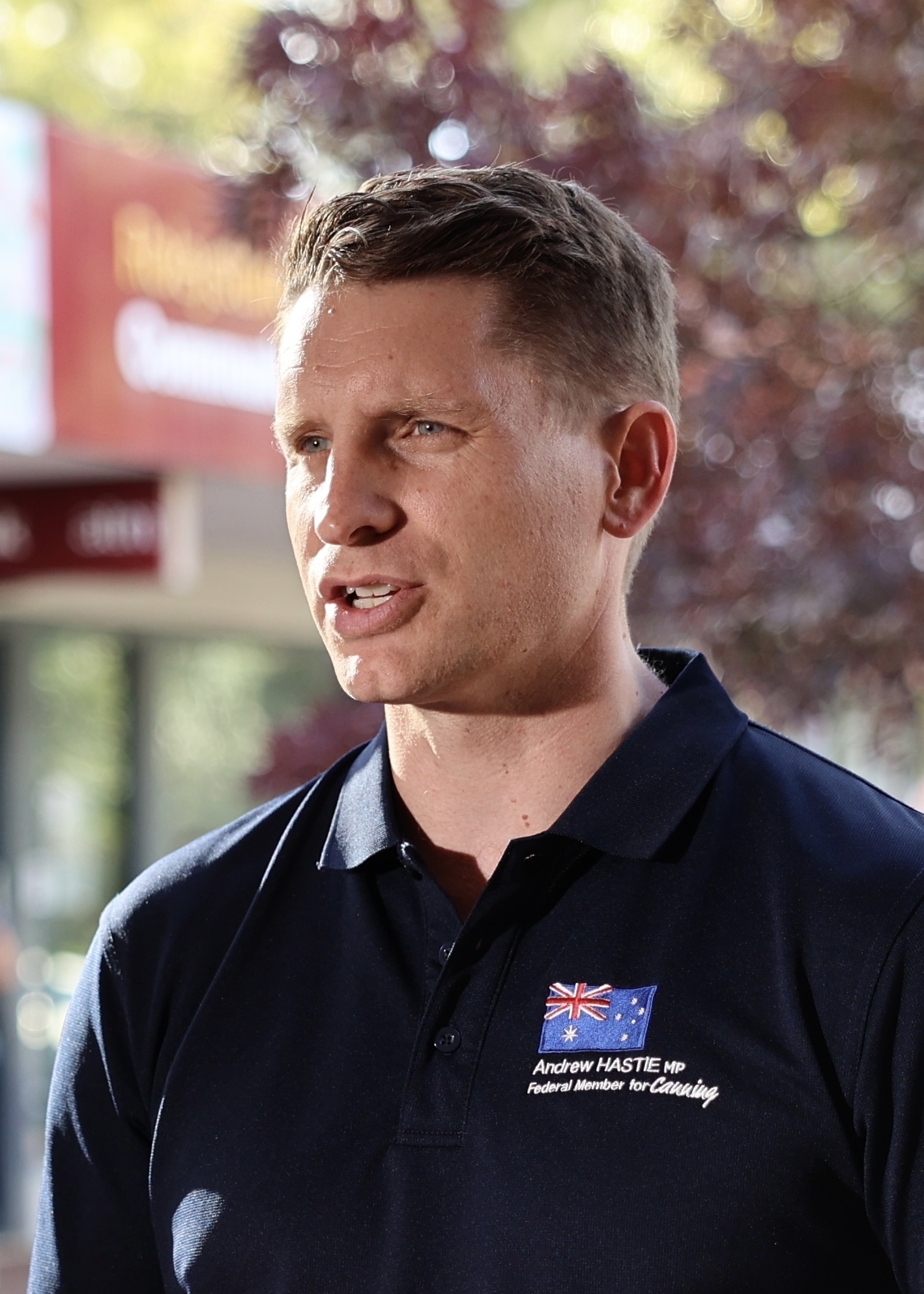
- Hastie in 2023

Deputy Leader of the Opposition in the House of Representatives (Note: Hastie holds the position of "Deputy Leader in the House of Representatives". As Deputy Leader of the Opposition Jane Hume is a member of the Senate, the election of a House-only deputy was necessary for procedural reasons.)
- Incumbent
- Assumed office 17 February 2026
- Leader: Angus Taylor
- Preceded by: Ted O'Brien (Note: As Deputy Leader of the Opposition)

Deputy Leader of the Liberal Party in the House of Representatives
- Incumbent
- Assumed office 17 February 2026
- Leader: Angus Taylor
- Preceded by: Ted O'Brien (Note: As deputy leader of the Liberal Party)

Shadow Minister for Industry and Sovereign Capability
- Incumbent
- Assumed office 17 February 2026
- Leader: Angus Taylor
- Preceded by: Alex Hawke (as Shadow Minister for Industry and Innovation)
Previous shadow ministerial positions
Shadow Minister for Home Affairs
In office 28 May 2025 – 3 October 2025
Leader	Sussan Ley
Preceded by	James Paterson
Succeeded by	Jonathon Duniam
Shadow Minister for Defence Industry Shadow Minister for Defence Personnel
In office 5 March 2024 – 28 May 2025
Leader	Peter Dutton; Sussan Ley (acting)
Preceded by	Luke Howarth
Succeeded by	Jacinta Nampijinpa Price
Shadow Minister for Defence
In office 5 June 2022 – 28 May 2025
Leader	Peter Dutton; Sussan Ley (acting)
Preceded by	Brendan O'Connor
Succeeded by	Angus Taylor
Previous positions
Assistant Minister for Defence
In office 22 December 2020 – 23 May 2022
Prime Minister	Scott Morrison
Minister	Linda Reynolds; Peter Dutton
Preceded by	Alex Hawke
Succeeded by	Matt Thistlethwaite
Chair of the Parliamentary Joint Committee on Intelligence and Security
In office 15 February 2017 – 22 December 2020
Deputy	Anthony Byrne
Preceded by	Michael Sukkar
Succeeded by	James Paterson

Member of the Australian Parliament for Canning
- Incumbent
- Assumed office 19 September 2015
- Preceded by: Don Randall

Personal details
- Born: Andrew William Hastie; 30 September 1982 (age 44) Wangaratta, Victoria, Australia
- Party: Liberal
- Spouse: Ruth Hastie (m. 2008)
- Children: 3
- Education: University of New South Wales (ADFA); Royal Military College, Duntroon; Harvard Extension School
- Website: andrewhastie.com.au

Military service
- Allegiance: Australia
- Branch/service: Australian Army
- Years of service: 2001–2015
- Rank: Captain
- Unit: 2nd Cavalry Regiment; SAS Regiment
- Battles/wars: War in Afghanistan; Military intervention against ISIL

Andrew William Hastie (born 30 September 1982) is an Australian politician and former military officer serving as Deputy Leader of the Opposition in the House of Representatives and Deputy Leader of the Liberal Party in the House of Representatives since 2026. He has been the member of parliament (MP) for the Western Australian division of Canning since 2015.

Hastie was born in Wangaratta, Victoria. He completed a Bachelor of Arts in History and Philosophy through the University of New South Wales at the Australian Defence Force Academy, later completing officer training at the Royal Military College, Duntroon in 2006. He was subsequently deployed to Afghanistan during the war in Afghanistan and served as a troop commander in the Special Air Service Regiment. Hastie left the Australian Defence Force in 2015, and was first elected to the House of Representatives at the 2015 Canning by-election, replacing Don Randall.

Hastie served as the Assistant Minister for Defence from 2020 to 2022, during the Morrison government. Following the 2022 election, he served as Shadow Minister for Defence and Shadow Minister for Defence Industry and Defence Personnel in the Dutton shadow ministry. He chaired the Parliamentary Joint Committee on Intelligence and Security from 2017 to 2020.

Hastie was appointed Shadow Minister for Home Affairs in May 2025. He retired from the role in October 2025 after resigning from the party's frontbench over internal policy disputes. He returned to the frontbench in February 2026 as the Shadow Minister for Industry and Sovereign Capability.

Hastie is a prominent member of the National Right faction. His views have been described as populist, including strong stances against multiculturalism, immigration, abortion, LGBTQ rights, and net-zero emissions in Australia.

== Early life and education ==
Andrew William Hastie was born in Wangaratta, Victoria, on 30 September 1982. His father, Peter, was a pastor in Wangaratta and later in the inner Sydney suburb of Ashfield, where he helped found Australia's first Mandarin-speaking Presbyterian church. His mother, Sue, was a primary school teacher for children with special needs. His paternal grandfather, Flight Lieutenant Norman William Hastie, served as an officer in the Royal Australian Air Force during the Pacific War and was awarded the Distinguished Flying Cross after being severely wounded while covering the air-sea rescue of two downed Australian airmen. Hastie has said his grandfather's example of courage and devotion to duty was a formative influence on his own values. Growing up, Hastie was close to his maternal grandmother, Rose. Rose was a nurse who had cared for Hastie's maternal grandfather.

When Hastie's family moved to the inner west of Sydney, he began his primary education at Ashbury Public School. From the age of five years old, he attended The Scots College in Sydney. Intending to become a journalist, Hastie began a Bachelor of Arts in history, politics, and philosophy at the University of New South Wales (UNSW) in February 2001.

Following the 11 September attacks, and finding the political left he encountered at UNSW's Kensington campus incompatible with his own views, Hastie transferred to the Australian Defence Force Academy in Canberra, where he earned an honours degree in history. His final thesis examined Charles Bean's Official History of Australia in the War of 1914–1918.

He began officer training at the Royal Military College, Duntroon, in 2006, where he met his political mentor John Anderson. In 2007, he took a foreign policy course in Washington, D.C. He has also completed a Graduate Certificate in business economics through Harvard Extension School.

== Military career ==
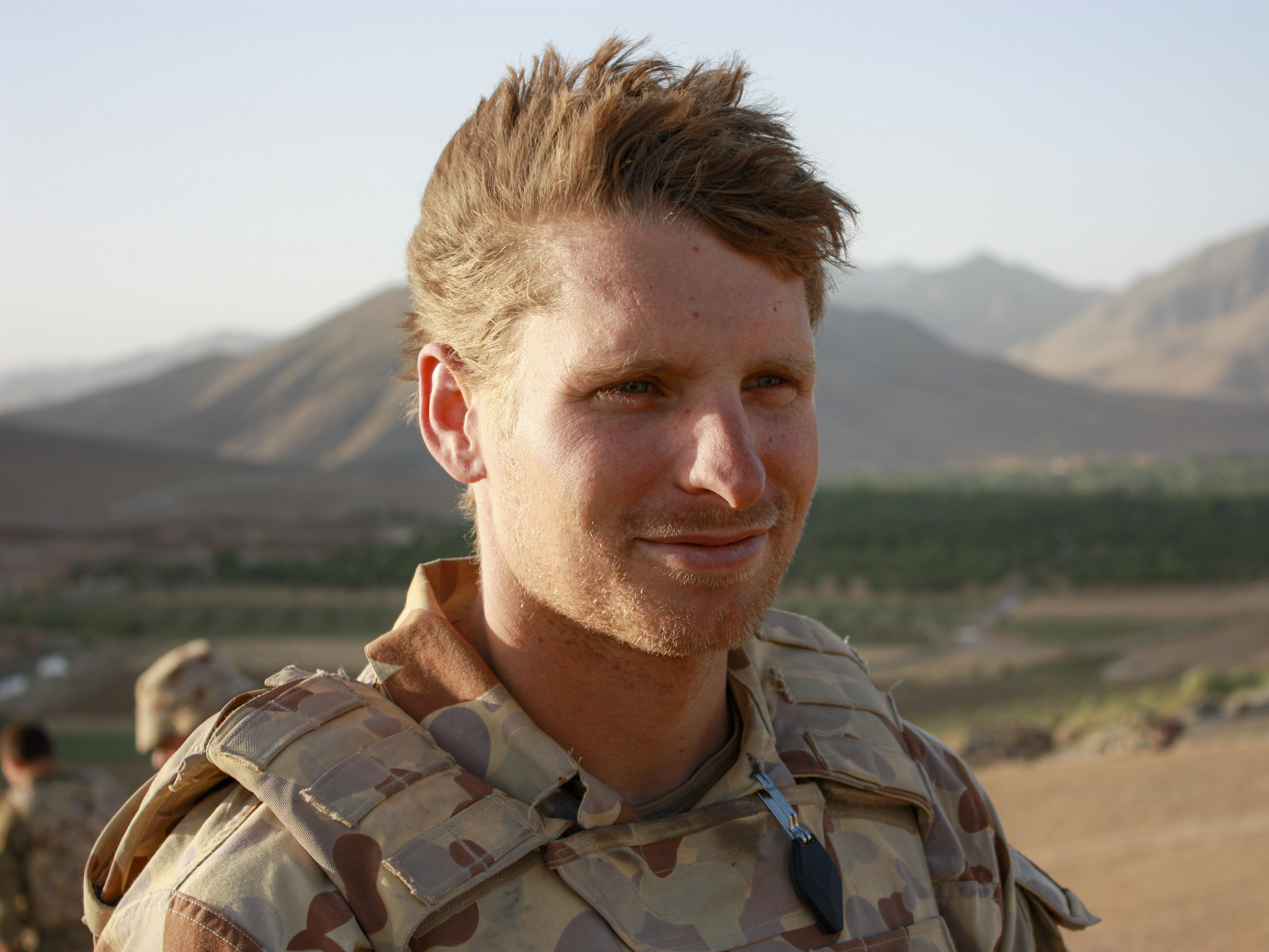
Hastie serving with the Mentoring and Reconstruction Task Force Two in 2009

Hastie began his military career as an officer cadet in 2001. He completed his officer training at Duntroon in 2006, and he was commissioned as a lieutenant in December of that year. He was posted in 2007 to the 2nd Cavalry Regiment, based in Palmerston, Northern Territory. Hastie commanded a cavalry troop in 2008, before it was deployed in Afghanistan the following year. Hastie was deployed to Afghanistan with Mentoring and Reconstruction Task Force Two, where he commanded a troop of Australian Light Armoured Vehicles. The troop's armoured operations began at the start of the fighting season in May 2009 and concluded in February 2010.

=== Special Air Service Regiment ===
In 2010, Hastie moved to Perth, Western Australia, to prepare for the Special Air Service Selection course. He began the course in July 2010, and was one of 30 out of 130 soldiers to complete it. A further 15 soldiers dropped out during the subsequent 18-month Reinforcement Cycle. In May 2012, Hastie was deployed to Port Moresby to support the Papua New Guinea Defence Force at the general election.

From February to July 2013, Hastie served in Afghanistan as a Troop Captain with Special Operations Task Group Rotation XIX, working primarily with Afghan partner forces to target the Taliban. During a battle in Zabul, some members of Hastie's Special Air Service Regiment (SASR) troop severed the hands of deceased Taliban soldiers. Hastie observed a severed hand and asked what was happening. He then ordered his unit to cease the practice, and the incident was reported to his commanding officer. During a later inquiry, a corporal gave evidence that the troop members had severed the hands of their own accord, because they did not have time to retrieve biometric material and they needed to get back to their helicopters to leave. The inquiry found that Australian troops in Afghanistan were not explicitly informed whether the collection of body parts for biometric testing was acceptable.

Hastie was deployed in 2014 and 2015 to the Middle East, serving as an Operations Officer for Operation Gallant Phoenix, the international intelligence fusion centre based in Jordan.

== Political career ==
Hastie joined the Liberal Party in 2013. In an interview with the Herald Sun, he said "I was always interested in politics as a vocation after the Army; it was always just a question of when." He resigned from the ADF in August 2015 after announcing his candidacy for the 2015 Canning by-election.

=== Turnbull government (2015–2018) ===
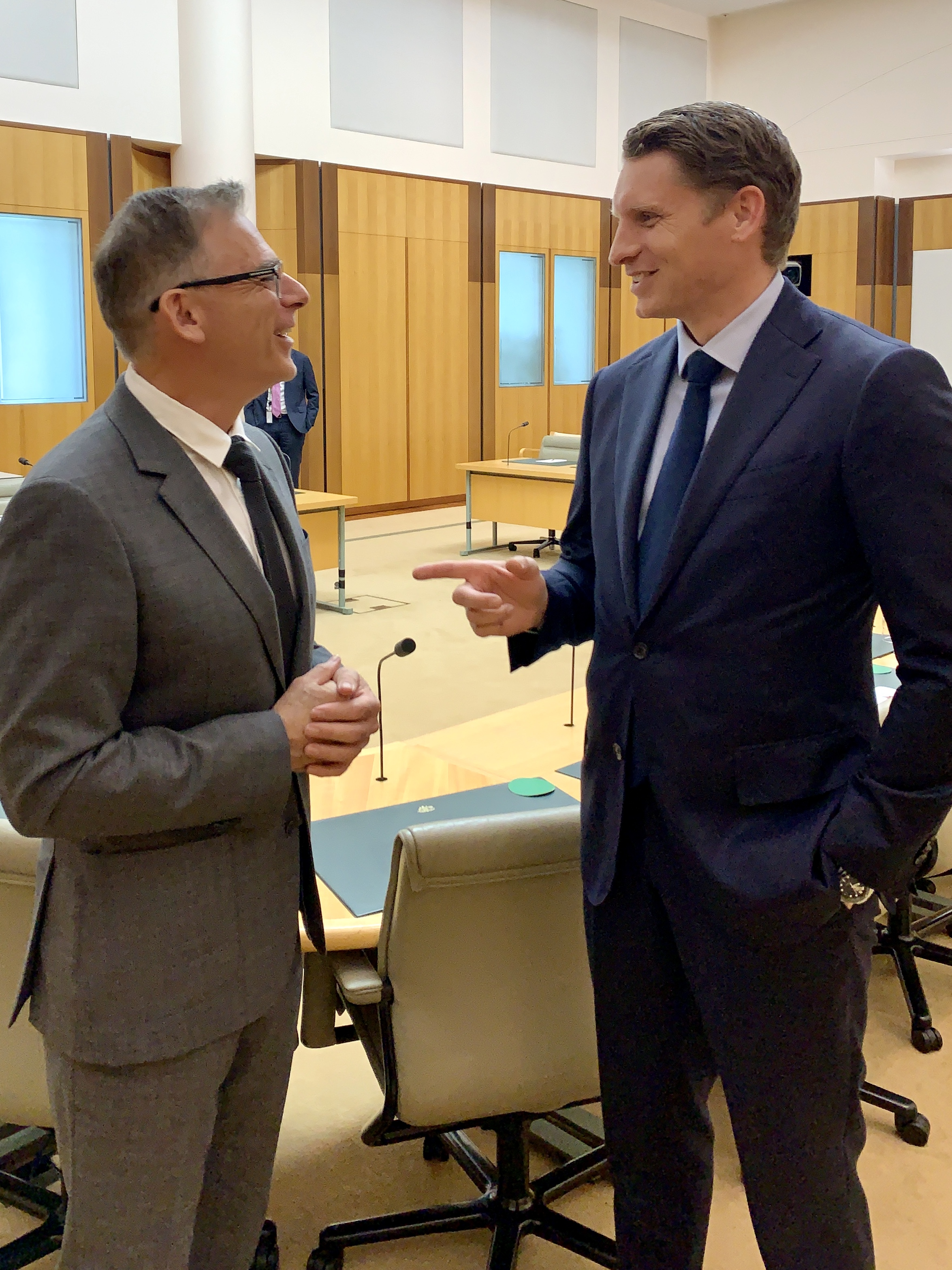
Hastie, Chair of the Parliamentary Joint Committee on Intelligence and Security, with Deputy Chair Anthony Byrne in February 2020

The Canning seat became vacant due to the death in office of Liberal member of parliament Don Randall, triggering the 2015 Canning by-election. Having won the Liberal Party pre-selection, Hastie campaigned with support from Mathias Cormann and Julie Bishop. During the campaign, he was asked if he was a creationist like his father. Hastie answered, "I'm proud of my father's service to the community. I stand behind him. I'm not going to be drawn, like I said, on issues of theology. I'm interested in public policy. There's no religious test in this country for public office."

Hastie won 55.26% of votes under the two-party-preferred system, defeating Labor candidate Matt Keogh. He joined the government of Malcolm Turnbull, who had become Prime Minister of Australia a week before the Canning by-election. Hastie gave his first speech on 13 October 2015. Hastie stood again for the Division of Canning at the 2016 Australian federal election, winning 56.79% of the votes (two-party-preferred vote count) against Labor opposition candidate Barry Winmar. This election result moved the seat from "safe" to "fairly safe" according to the Australian Electoral Commission. In September 2016, Hastie was appointed to the Parliamentary Joint Committee on Intelligence and Security; he chaired this joint committee from 2017 to 2020.

=== Morrison government (2018–2022) ===
During the August 2018 Liberal Party leadership spills, Hastie publicly supported a change in the party's leadership. Scott Morrison was subsequently elected leader of the Liberal Party, thus becoming Prime Minister of Australia as the leader of the majority party in the House of Representatives. In 2018, Hastie publicly supported Alcoa Australia workers on strike, stating that "energy production in Australia is too expensive and it is hurting industry, workers, seniors and families".

At the 2019 Australian federal election, Hastie ran for re‑election and secured 61.46% of the two-party-preferred vote against the Australian Labor Party's Mellisa Teede.

Hastie opposed dredging and the development of the Mandurah Estuary for a proposed 300‑berth marina, stating "We're up against a business taking direction from overseas without any long term interests in the safety, the security and the health of our local environment. The central question is whether or not local people have a say over the natural assets we are called to steward for future generations". He supported a $22 million foreshore development project, which received $7 million in federal funding; the project included a new civic square, convention centre, large‑scale adventure play area, and ecotourism hub.

On 22 December 2020, Hastie was appointed to the outer ministry as Assistant Minister for Defence, becoming a part of Australia's executive government. As Assistant Minister for Defence, Hastie told military personnel in April 2021 that their "core business" would always be the "application of lethal violence" in defence of Australia's values and sovereignty, and that "mission clarity is vital" to their work. His message was reported to align with directives issued by then-Defence Minister Peter Dutton. The message and directives came amid concerns that defence forces were too focused on social issues, with Liberal Party MP Phillip Thompson arguing that "we've gone a little bit woke over the past few years, and we can't afford to be doing that" and that the military had leaned "too far to the left".

=== Opposition (2022–present) ===
The Liberal Party were defeated by the Labor Party at the 2022 federal election; the Liberal–National Coalition therefore moved to the opposition benches. Hastie retained his Canning seat, winning 43.8% of first-preference votes and 53.59% of two-party-preferred votes against Labor's Amanda Hunt. There was, however, a 7.79% swing against him, which made Canning a marginal seat. He served under Opposition Leader Peter Dutton as Shadow Defence Minister and Shadow Minister for Defence Industry & Defence Personnel.

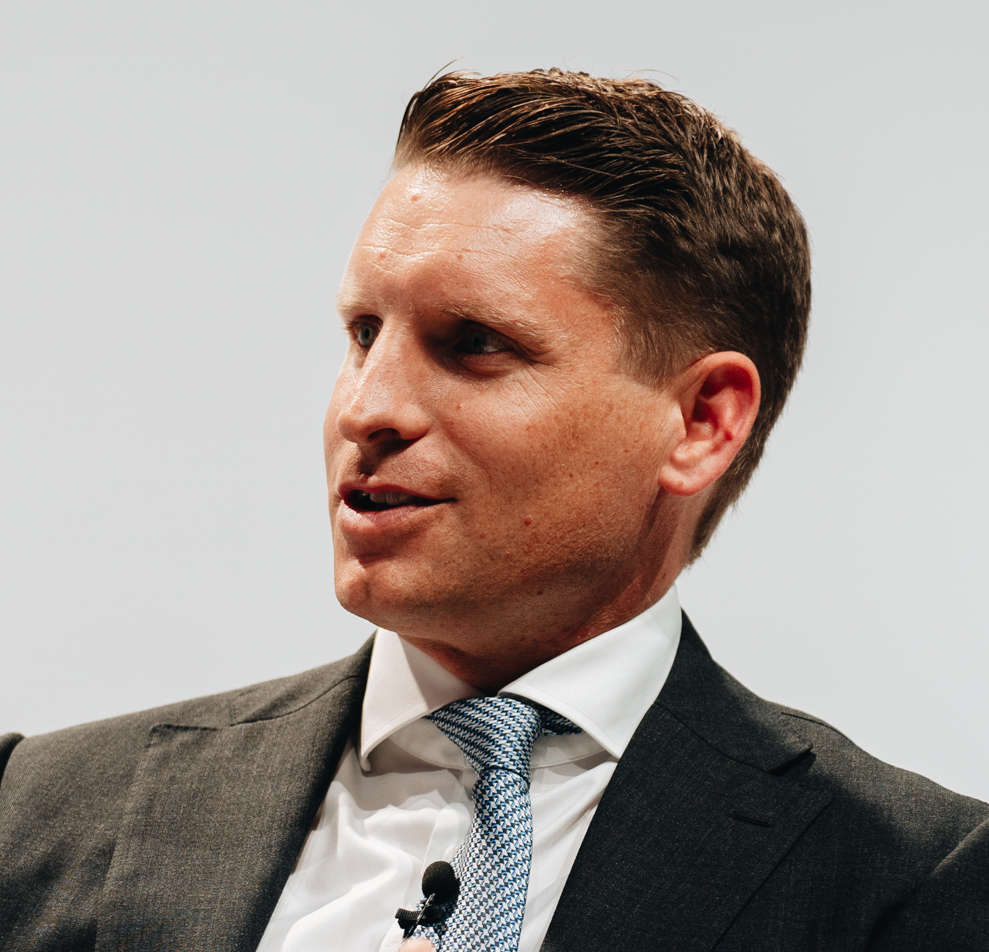
Hastie in a 2023 panel discussion on liberal democracy

Hastie said that prior to the 2025 Australian federal election, polling in Canning showed that Dutton "was leading Anthony Albanese in personal favourability, but there was a catch: only one in four voters knew who Peter Dutton was, and that he was vulnerable to Labor defining him". He further said that during the campaign, Labor used social media to make "savage personal attacks" against Dutton, despite a promise to be more respectful in politics. Writing for WAtoday, Hamish Hastie (Note: Hamish Hastie is not related to Andrew Hastie.) stated: "In the face of Dutton's issues and an increasingly bad campaign, Hastie jettisoned mentions of nuclear power, the Liberal leader – and the Liberal Party itself – from much of his campaigning". Hastie also removed much of the Liberal branding from his shirts and billboards. Hastie was not highly visible during much of the national campaign, focusing instead on local electioneering in Canning.

Hastie avoided the worst of the large national swing against the Liberals, despite redistribution reducing his notional lead in Canning. He won 42.52% of first-preference votes and 56.55% of two-party preferred votes, a net notional 5.35% swing against Labor's Jarrad Goold. The election saw heavy losses for the Liberals in metropolitan Australia. Hastie was one of few metropolitan-adjacent Liberals nationally to record a swing in his favour at the election, on both a primary and two-party basis. Following the Liberal Party's loss in the seat of Bullwinkel to Labor's Trish Cook, Hastie became the only Liberal MP representing a metropolitan Perth seat.

On 9 May, Hastie gave an interview about the 2025 election, in which he criticised the Liberal campaign and the party's reliance on ex-staffers, and also raised issues with Dutton. Hastie attributed his success in Canning, in part, to avoiding topics related to Dutton and nuclear energy. During the campaign, Dutton had promised to use taxpayer funds to build nuclear power plants. Hastie's opinion on nuclear energy was that the moratorium on its use in Australia should end, but any plants should be constructed by the private sector rather than the government.

In submissions to the Liberal Party's post-election review, Dutton criticised Hastie's performance as Shadow Defence Minister. According to reporting on the submissions, Dutton said Hastie had gone "on strike" and had failed to prepare a detailed costing for the Coalition's proposed increase in defence spending. Dutton stated that as a consequence, the Coalition's defence policy had been released late in the campaign. Dutton also said Hastie was reluctant to criticise the Albanese government's defence record in the media. Hastie rejected the criticism, saying that Dutton and his office were responsible for the late release of the Coalition's defence policy.

On 28 May 2025, Hastie was appointed by Sussan Ley to the position of Shadow Minister for Home Affairs in Ley's first shadow ministry. However, he resigned from the opposition frontbench on 3 October 2025, less than five months after his appointment. His resignation followed a letter from Ley which, he said, "made it clear that [he] would not be involved in leading or developing our policy or strategy on immigration". Hastie stated that he "could not see how I could continue as the Shadow Home Affairs Minister and remain silent on immigration policy".

On 17 February 2026, after MP Angus Taylor was elected party leader in the leadership spill that deposed Ley, Hastie was reappointed to the shadow ministry, becoming Shadow Minister for Industry and Sovereign Capability. Hastie also took the position of Deputy Leader of the Opposition in the House of Representatives; the position was re-created because newly elected Deputy Liberal Leader Jane Hume sits in the Senate (rather than the House, as her predecessor as deputy had). This position and promotion was seen as a prize for Hastie as a right-faction supporter of Taylor, within the previously centre-right Liberal Party, and also marked the further rightward movement of the party under Taylor.

On 20 August 2026, Hastie, along with Aaron Violi, Jonathon Duniam, and Kate Chaney, established the Joint Select Committee on Artificial Intelligence,

== Ben Roberts-Smith war crimes allegations ==
Hastie served alongside Victoria Cross for Australia recipient Ben Roberts-Smith in Afghanistan. Following a series of media reports in 2018 alleging that Roberts-Smith had committed war crimes and bullied fellow soldiers, Roberts-Smith commenced defamation proceedings in the Federal Court against three journalists and a subsidiary of Nine Entertainment. Hastie gave evidence under subpoena for Nine in the defamation trial. Hastie told the Federal Court of Australia that Roberts-Smith had a reputation within the SASR for bullying. He said he had once held Roberts-Smith in high regard but was no longer proud of him.

The Federal Court found that Nine had established the substantial or contextual truth of the allegations that Roberts-Smith had committed war crimes. After the finding, Hastie said he felt both sadness and relief. He praised the former SASR members who had given evidence, saying that they had demonstrated moral courage and helped the regiment confront its conduct. After Roberts-Smith was arrested and charged with war crimes in April 2026, Hastie said no one was above the law.

In April 2026, Pauline Hanson said her political party One Nation would target Hastie in Canning over his evidence in Roberts-Smith's defamation trial. Hastie responded in June that he would give One Nation "war". In September 2026, an episode of Pauline Hanson's Please Explain called "Don't be Hastie" targeted Hastie. Hastie told News24 that the cartoon called him a "traitor" eight times, and asked if they were "saying the same thing of the other 20 SAS combat veterans who gave evidence" against Roberts-Smith. He called Hanson and Barnaby Joyce "lying cowards". He initially hinted at legal action, but later stated he would not pursue this path, adding that he would not sue someone who was financially backed by Australia's richest person, Gina Rinehart. Hanson and Joyce both denied calling Hastie a traitor. Hastie received support from Angus Taylor, Senator Jacqui Lambie, and Labor MP Chris Bowen.

== Views ==
Hastie is a member of the National Right faction of the Liberal Party. His views have been described as "populist", with strong stances against multiculturalism, immigration, late-term abortions, and the transition to net zero emissions in Australia. He is also an outspoken critic of One Nation and its leader Pauline Hanson.

Hastie is a member of the Atlantic Council, an international foreign policy think tank connected to conservative politicians Mike Gallagher from the United States and Tom Tugendhat from the United Kingdom.

=== China ===
Hastie has expressed concern about the freedom of Australian universities and media institutions. He stated in his maiden speech that "freely-formed associations are the basis of Australian society and are the fullest expression of self-government".

Hastie's concerns about Australia maintaining its sovereignty in the face of China's rising regional power led him to form the Parliamentary Friends of Democracy with Labor senator Kimberley Kitching. In August 2019, he wrote an opinion article, "We Must See China with Clear Eyes", for The Sydney Morning Herald and The Age newspapers. In the article, he stated that "Communist China", rather than Islamic terrorism, would be the real security concern of the 21st century. The piece was denounced by the Chinese Embassy in Australia as reflecting a "Cold War mentality", while Western Australian Premier Mark McGowan accused Hastie of "threatening WA jobs with extreme and inflammatory language." Conversely, Hastie received praise from fellow Liberal MPs Dave Sharma and Peter Dutton and professor Clive Hamilton. The Chinese embassy disinvited Hastie from a planned study trip to China with the China Matters think tank.

In May 2020, Hastie was one of 20 Australian politicians to sign a letter condemning the "comprehensive assault on [Hong Kong's] autonomy, rule of law and fundamental freedoms" in response to a "new legal framework and enforcement mechanism". He was one of a number of backbenchers to push for additional restrictions on foreign investment in Australian companies. Hastie argued such investments are part of a wider campaign of political warfare conducted by the Chinese Communist Party.

=== Environment and climate change ===
Hastie opposed the dredging of the Point Grey Marina, arguing in favour of "the sovereignty of local communities to make decisions about how they conserve and develop their environment". He supported the investment of $3 million by the Environment Restoration Fund to protect Carnaby's black cockatoo, a bird endemic to Southwest Australia and currently listed as endangered due to habitat loss.

Hastie has criticized Australia's net-zero emissions policy. He argues that the 2050 net-zero target is in "the name of climate alarmism". Hastie has publicly opposed the Paris Agreement on reducing greenhouse gas emissions, as well as the National Energy Guarantee (NEG). He stated in August 2018 that he did not support the NEG as it existed at the time. He cited issues including unclear assurances of energy affordability and energy-related risks to national security as his reasons for opposing the NEG.

In September 2025, following the release of Australia's first National Climate Risk Assessment, which highlighted the severe social and economic consequences of climate change, Hastie threatened to resign from the Coalition frontbench if the Liberal Party committed to the net-zero emissions target.

=== Immigration ===
In 2018, Hastie supported calls for white South African farmers to be resettled in Australia. Hastie headlined at a rally in 2019, along with fellow Liberal MP Ian Goodenough, in support of the farmers. Hastie has made frequent comments regarding immigration to Australia, including some that have been interpreted as critical of former Liberal Party leader Sussan Ley. In 2025, he used the phrase "strangers in our own country", popularised by conservative British politician Enoch Powell in his controversial 1968 "Rivers of Blood" speech. Hastie used the phrase in a claim that immigration was responsible for rising housing prices and declining quality of life in Australia.

=== Christianity and marriage equality ===
Hastie is an Anglican. Labor MP Brian Mitchell described him as "a man of deep faith". He has cited his Christian faith as informing his views on various policies, such as individual freedoms. He has said his political views are shaped by the theological concept of imago dei, the belief that human beings are created in the image of God. On the origins of the universe, Hastie said "my view is that God is the first mover".

Hastie campaigned against same-sex marriage and abstained from the 2017 parliamentary vote to legalise marriage of same-sex couples. He had publicly stated he would vote with his constituents, but ultimately refused to vote on religious grounds. He has stated that his opposition to same-sex marriage rests on natural law reasoning rather than religious authority, arguing that marriage has historically been a union between a man and a woman ordered towards family life.

== Personal life ==
Hastie met his wife, Ruth, while he was taking a short course at George Washington University. He proposed to her on the steps of the Sydney Opera House. The two were married in 2008 at the Capitol Hill Baptist Church in Washington, D.C. Their children were born in Perth in June 2015, August 2017, and November 2021. As of October 2026 Hastie lives with his family in the City of Mandurah in the Peel region of Western Australia.
