= Ensuring Integrity Bill =

Name given to three bills introduced into the Parliament of Australia

Fair Work (Registered Organisations) Amendment (Ensuring Integrity No. 2) Bill 2019

Parliament of Australia
- Long title: A Bill for an Act to amend the Fair Work (Registered Organisations) Act 2009, and for related purposes
- Citation: First Reading
- Enacted by: House of Representatives
- Considered by: Senate

Legislative history

Initiating chamber: House of Representatives
- Bill title: Fair Work (Registered Organisations) Amendment (Ensuring Integrity No. 2) Bill 2019
- First reading: 4 December 2019
- Second reading: 5 December 2019
- Third reading: 5 December 2019

Revising chamber: Senate
- Bill title: Fair Work (Registered Organisations) Amendment (Ensuring Integrity No. 2) Bill 2019
- First reading: 5 December 2019
- Status: Not passed

The Ensuring Integrity Bill is the name given to three bills introduced into the Parliament of Australia:

- Fair Work (Registered Organisations) Amendment (Ensuring Integrity) Bill 2017, a bill first introduced by the Turnbull government in 2017, lapsed on 1 July 2019
- Fair Work (Registered Organisations) Amendment (Ensuring Integrity) Bill 2019, a re-introduction of the bill in July 2019 by the Morrison government, defeated on 28 November 2019 in the Senate
- Fair Work (Registered Organisations) Amendment (Ensuring Integrity No. 2) Bill 2019, a re-introduction of the bill in December 2019 by the Morrison government, after the previous one was defeated a few days prior. Third reading was agreed to in House of Representatives on 5 December 2019. In May 2020, the bill was shelved by the government.

The bill proposes to:

- give the Federal Court of Australia power to cancel the registration of a registered organisation (that is, a union or an employer organisation) or disqualify office-holders from holding an office within an organisation;
- introduce offences for acting as an officeholder while disqualified; and
- introduce a public interest test for the amalgamation of registered organisations.

== First 2019 bill ==
The first 2019 bill was introduced at the start of the 46th Parliament in July 2019, in the aftermath of the Royal Commission into Trade Union Governance and Corruption and particularly the revelation of misconduct within the Construction, Forestry, Maritime, Mining and Energy Union (CFMEU). John Setka, the Victorian Secretary of the CFMEU, was asked to be expelled from the Australian Labor Party, and even resign as head of CFMEU Victorian branch, over alleged comments against "anti-violence campaigner Rosie Batty".

Crossbencher Senator Jacqui Lambie has threatened to vote for the bill if Setka did not resign from the CFMEU Victoria branch, to the point that she invited Setka over to her Tasmanian home for Sunday roast, in a bid to convince Setka to resign.

Labor and the Greens were opposed to the bill. This left the deciding power to the other five crossbencher senators: Lambie, Centre Alliance senators Rex Patrick and Stirling Griff, Pauline Hanson's One Nation senators Pauline Hanson and Malcolm Roberts.

The government had assumed One Nation would be supporting the bill and would hence ensure its passage in the Senate. However, on 28 November 2019, the bill was defeated in the Senate on a 34–34 tie vote, after One Nation apparently blindsided the government and voted against it. Lambie also voted against it, after her amendments were rejected by the government.

== Second 2019 bill ==
A few days after the first 2019 bill was defeated, the second 2019 bill was reintroduced into the parliament on 4 December 2019. The third reading was agreed to in the House of Representatives the following day on 5 December 2019.

Jacqui Lambie stated in January 2020 that she might consider supporting the bill if her amendments were supported by the government. Lambie already had preliminary discussions about her amendments with Rex Patrick, who will likely back the bill in the Senate. Pauline Hanson stated she was open to shifting her position after opposing the previous bill, but would only make the decision after she had seen the updated version of the bill, spoken to Malcolm Roberts and met with all interested parties.

On 26 May 2020, Morrison announced that the government will shelve the bill, Instead, the government will chair five working groups ahead of the budget later that year in October, to try to reach a consensus with unions and employers to change the current industrial relations system. Morrison stated that the current system is "not fit for purpose".
