= Regular Old Bogan =

- Genre: Animated sitcom
- Created by: Mark Nicholson; Sebastian Peart
- Directed by: Sebastian Peart
- Starring: Mark Nicholson; Natalie Bond; Sebastian Peart
- Composer: Peter Corrigan
- Country of origin: Australia
- Original language: English
- No. of series: 1
- No. of episodes: 6

Production
- Executive producer: Michael Horrocks
- Producers: Ben Shackleford; Mark Nicholson
- Running time: 30 minutes
- Production companies: Stepmates Studios; Seven Studios

Original release
- Network: 7mate
- Release: 26 October – 23 November 2020

Regular Old Bogan is an Australian animated sitcom that premiered on 7mate on 26 October 2020. It is created by Mark Nicholson and Sebastian Peart from Melbourne Production company Stepmates Studios. It aired on 7mate as part of their "Ani-Mate your Wednesday" night block which during that time also consisted of The Simpsons, Futurama, Family Guy and American Dad.

The series was added to Tubi in August 2021.

== Synopsis ==
Described as Australia's answer to South Park, the series will follow the Stubbs family who will encounter outrageous situations from getting lost in the outback, to facing Death Row in a Balinese prison.

== Episodes ==
No.	Title	Original release date
1	"Spoof Creek"	26 October 2020
After a fishing trip goes awry, Gav and Toby find themselves stranded in the Australian outback and have no option but to accept a lift from a tourist-hating, pig-shooting, foul-mouthed local.
2	"Mandemic"	2 November 2020
When Gav's "Man Flu" takes a grave turn, and all men in the world are also hospitalised - he must uncover the mastermind behind the deadly contagion before it's too late.
3	"Once Upon a Time in Bali"	9 November 2020
The Stubbs take a holiday in Bali. When Mary is tourist trapped at the famous Schapelle Corby Museum, the family must stage a prison break and rescue her from death row.
4	"Mamils"	16 November 2020
After being cut off in traffic by cyclists, Gav provokes war with a dangerous gang of Middle Aged Men In Lycra. Meanwhile, Wendy tries meth to get more done around the house.
5	"Something About Mary"	23 November 2020
The government starts drug testing welfare recipients. Mary starts a lucrative business selling her clean urine to the junkies under the guise of a lemonade stand and reaches Heisenberg-level infamy.
6	"The Queen of the Dingoes"	23 November 2020
The Stubbs go camping. When Mary is kidnapped by wild dingoes, she confronts a 40 year old Azaria Chamberlain -- Queen Of The Dingoes. Toby finds himself in a sticky situation.
