= Mark Nicholson (filmmaker) =

Australian politician and filmmaker

- Education: Monash University
- Occupations: Politician; Filmmaker; Criminal lawyer
- Notable work: Pauline Hanson's Please Explain; Regular Old Bogan; A Super Progressive Movie
- Political party: One Nation (since 2026)
- Children: 1

Mark Andrew Nicholson is an Australian politician, filmmaker and former criminal lawyer, best known for co-founding the animation company Stepmates Studios with Sebastian Peart. He created the political satire series Pauline Hanson's Please Explain and the film A Super Progressive Movie. He is also the One Nation candidate for the Northern Metropolitan Region in the 2026 Victorian state election.

== Biography ==
=== Law career ===
In a 2026 interview, Nicholson stated that he studied at Monash University, where he claimed to have been indoctrinated to be progressive. There, he earned an Honours degree in Law. In the courtroom, he said that criminals were "not treated as criminals" and were treated more like "patients", only being told they were "sick". Reporting in August 2026 suggests the duration of the law career was "approximately six weeks".

=== Political career ===
Nicholson joined One Nation and was announced as the 2026 Victorian election candidate for Northern Metropolitan Region in August 2026. He claimed he had found "home" inside One Nation, saying he trusted the party and their party leader, Pauline Hanson.

In October 2026, Nicholson made a statement that former premiers Daniel Andrews and Jacinta Allan will be "in prison by Christmas" due to alleged fraud conducted by the pair, claiming that they wasted billions of taxpayer dollars. These remarks were backed by Pauline Hanson, stating they should be "held accountable" when questioned by Avi Yemini of Rebel News. Nicholson later told Chris Kenny of News24 that he was being flippant but believed that Allan and Andrews have "questions to answer", further adding that "heads should roll" over the loss of taxpayer money.

=== Stepmates Studios ===
Nicholson and his business partner Sebastian Peart began producing films from a back shed, gathering savings to buy a camera, however they lost the camera when it fell out of the back of their car. They eventually got a call from Channel Seven to enter professional filmmaking, and they created the sitcom Regular Old Bogan, which premiered on 7mate on 26 October 2020. After joining One Nation, Nicholson and Peart created Pauline Hanson's Please Explain, originally starting off with six episodes, eventually growing to more than a hundred.

Nicholson has said he will continue making the Please Explain series even if he enters the Victorian parliament, claiming that he would "have a panic attack" if he was forced to stop making cartoons.

== Personal life ==
Nicholson lives in Abbotsford, Victoria with his wife and daughter.
