= Pauline Hanson's Please Explain =

Australian web series

- Also known as: Please Explain
- Genre: Comedy; Political satire
- Voices of: Mark Nicholson; Pauline Hanson
- Country of origin: Australia
- Original language: English
- No. of seasons: 4
- No. of episodes: 85 (Note: This includes the episode "Voter Fraud", which is unavailable on YouTube or on social media in Australia due to a takedown order from the Australian Electoral Commission (AEC). Re-uploaded versions are available on YouTube.)

Production
- Running time: 3 minutes
- Production companies: Pauline Hanson's One Nation; Stepmates Studios

Original release
- Network: YouTube; News24
- Release: 12 November 2021 – present

Pauline Hanson's Please Explain is an Australian animated conservative political satire web series. It is produced by Stepmates Studios, a Melbourne-based production company, for One Nation, a far-right populist political party in Australia founded and led by Pauline Hanson. It aims to parody current political events while promoting the One Nation party and its policies. Episodes are released on One Nation's YouTube channel every Friday and re-broadcast on News24.

== Overview ==
Seasons 1 and 2 are set at Parliament House in Canberra, following Hanson (voiced by herself) teaching a class of Australian politicians (voiced by Mark Nicholson), and parodies current political events while promoting the One Nation party and its policies. The setting in season 3 varies depending on the episode. Episodes are released on One Nation's YouTube channel every Friday and re-broadcast on News24.

The series has been subject to numerous controversies due to its content.

== Production ==
The series is produced by Stepmates Studios, a Melbourne-based production company,

Viewers have raised money for the series through donations and by purchases from One Nation's online store, most notably One Nation-branded alcohol (namely gin, rum and vodka).

In 2025, at CPAC Australia, Pauline Hanson announced that a feature film of the series would premiere on Australia Day 2026.

== Release ==
Episodes are released on One Nation's YouTube channel every Friday and re-broadcast on News24. The first episode was released on 12 November 2021.

== Episodes ==
=== Season 1 (2021–22) ===
| # | Title | Release date |
|---|---|---|
| 1 | "School's in Session" | 12 November 2021 |
| 2 | "Preferences" | 12 November 2021 |
| 3 | "Political Donations" | 19 November 2021 |
| 4 | "Excise Taxes" | 26 November 2021 |
| 5 | "Climate Change Policy" | 3 December 2021 |
| 6 | "Political Dishonesty" | 10 December 2021 |
| 7 | "Political Self-Destruction" | 17 December 2021 |
| 8 | "Political Correctness" | 24 December 2021 |
| 9 | "Immigration" | 14 January 2022 |
| 10 | "The Prime Minister's Pension" | 21 January 2022 |
| 11 | "Australia Day" | 26 January 2022 |
| 12 | "Pork Barrelling" | 28 January 2022 |
| 13 | "Housing Affordability" | 3 February 2022 |
| 14 | "How to Pass the Buck" | 10 February 2022 |
| 15 | "The ABC" | 17 February 2022 |
| 16 | "A Labor Greens Government" | 24 February 2022 |
| 17 | "Party Policies" | 3 March 2022 |
| 18 | "The Canberra Swamp" | 10 March 2022 |
| 19 | "Disaster Management" | 17 March 2022 |
| 20 | "Presidential Politics" | 24 March 2022 |
| 21 | "Inflation" | 7 April 2022 |
| 22 | "The Campaign Easter Special" | 14 April 2022 |
| 23 | "The Media" | 21 April 2022 |
| 24 | "Voter Fraud" (Note: This episode has been taken down from YouTube and is unavailable on One Nation's official social media accounts in Australia, as it has been geoblocked upon order from the AEC.) | 28 April 2022 |
| 25 | "Keyboard Warriors" | 5 May 2022 |
| 26 | "Political Ads" | 12 May 2022 |
| 27 | "Battle of the Ballots" | 19 May 2022 |
| 28 | "The Aftermath" | 17 June 2022 |

=== Season 2 (2023) ===
| # | Title | Release date |
|---|---|---|
| 1 | "A New Term" | 2 February 2023 |
| 2 | "Economy in the Toilet" | 9 February 2023 |
| 3 | "The Voice" | 16 February 2023 |
| 4 | "The Zero-Sum Game" | 23 February 2023 |
| 5 | "Playing the Victim" | 2 March 2023 |
| 6 | "Under the Bus" | 9 March 2023 |
| 7 | "The Teal Housewives" | 16 March 2023 |
| 8 | "The Big Red Dragon" | 23 March 2023 |
| 9 | "Back to the Future" | 30 March 2023 |
| 10 | "The NDIS" | 6 April 2023 |
| 11 | "The Woke Mind Virus" | 20 April 2023 |
| 12 | "Captain Planet" | 27 April 2023 |
| 13 | "Jimonomics" | 4 May 2023 |
| 14 | "Jobseeker" | 11 May 2023 |
| 15 | "Box Tickers" | 18 May 2023 |
| 16 | "Woke Cinema" | 25 May 2023 |
| 17 | "Rental Crisis" | 1 June 2023 |
| 18 | "Chicken Little" | 8 June 2023 |
| 19 | "The Higgins Case" | 15 June 2023 |
| 20 | "The Future" | 22 June 2023 |
| 21 | "Recession" | 29 June 2023 |
| 22 | "The Nationals" | 6 July 2023 |
| 23 | "Woke Vision" | 13 July 2023 |
| 24 | "Censorship" | 20 July 2023 |
| 25 | "Referendum" | 27 July 2023 |
| 26 | "Housing Australia Future Fund" | 3 August 2023 |
| 27 | "Gender Confusion" | 10 August 2023 |
| 28 | "Global Boiling" | 24 August 2023 |
| 29 | "The Uluru Statement" | 31 August 2023 |
| 30 | "60 Day Dispensing" | 7 September 2023 |
| 31 | "Behind the Scenes" | 14 September 2023 |
| 32 | "Qantas" | 21 September 2023 |
| 33 | "Net Zero" | 28 September 2023 |
| 34 | "The Media's Voice" | 5 October 2023 |
| 35 | "Vote No" | 12 October 2023 |
| 36 | "The Blame Game" | 19 October 2023 |
| 37 | "Airbus Albo" | 24 November 2023 |
| 38 | "Minecraft" | 2 December 2023 |
| 39 | "Alphanese" | 8 December 2023 |
| 40 | "What Is a Woman?" | 15 December 2023 |
| 41 | "The Christmas Special" | 22 December 2023 |

=== Specials (2023) ===
| # | Title | Release date |
|---|---|---|
| 1 | "Thank You for Helping Make 'Pauline Hanson's Please Explain' Possible!" | 17 November 2023 |

=== Season 3 (2024) ===
| # | Title | Release date |
|---|---|---|
| 1 | "Distractions" | 1 March 2024 |
| 2 | "Chinese Spies" | 8 March 2024 |
| 3 | "Diversity, Inclusion, Equity" | 15 March 2024 |
| 4 | "Champagne Socialists" | 22 March 2024 |
| 5 | "The Albanese government" | 29 March 2024 |
| 6 | "Digital ID" | 5 April 2024 |
| 7 | "Carbon Capture Storage in the GAB" | 12 April 2024 |
| 8 | "Net-Zero-Bot" | 19 April 2024 |
| 9 | "eSafety Commissioner" | 26 April 2024 |
| 10 | "Immigration Junkies" | 3 May 2024 |
| 11 | "Bad Budgets and Big Computers" | 17 May 2024 |
| 12 | "Political Hit Jobs" | 24 May 2024 |
| 13 | "The Polls" | 31 May 2024 |
| 14 | "The Man from Snowy Hydro" | 7 June 2024 |
| 15 | "The State of Queensland" | 14 June 2024 |
| 16 | "Inside Albo" | 21 June 2024 |
| 17 | "The Big Rort" | 5 July 2024 |
| 18 | "NDIS: The Movie" | 12 July 2024 |
| 19 | "Division" | 19 July 2024 |
| 20 | "Cashless" | 26 July 2024 |
| 21 | "A Migrant A Minute" | 2 August 2024 |
| 22 | "Oppression Olympics" | 9 August 2024 |
| 23 | "Broken Promises" | 16 August 2024 |
| 24 | "National Insecurity" | 23 August 2024 |
| 25 | "Forgetting Adam Bandt" | 6 September 2024 |
| 26 | "Albo's War on Everything" | 13 September 2024 |
| 27 | "Censorship (A.K.A. Misinformation and Censorship)" | 20 September 2024 |
| 28 | "I'm Not Scomo (A.K.A. I Promise I'm Not Scomo)" | 4 October 2024 |
| 29 | "Day in the Life of a Green" | 11 October 2024 |
| 30 | "The State of Melbourne" | 18 October 2024 |
| 31 | "QueenSLAM 2024 (A.K.A. Queensland Election)" | 25 October 2024 |
| 32 | "Lefties Losing It" | 8 November 2024 |
| 33 | "[CENSORED]" | 15 November 2024 |
| 34 | "Please Explained (Part 1)" | 22 November 2024 |
| 35 | "Please Explained (Part 2)" | 29 November 2024 |

=== Season 4 (2026) ===
| # | Title | Release date |
|---|---|---|
| 1 | "Welcome to Australia" | 24 April 2026 |
| 2 | "GetUp" | 8 May 2026 |
| 3 | "Labor Lies" | 22 May 2026 |
| 4 | "Defund the ABC" | 5 June 2026 |
| 5 | "Dark Forces" | 26 June 2026 |
| 6 | "The Pelican" | 10 July 2026 |
| 7 | "Don't Be Hastie" | 24 July 2026 |
| 8 | "Rent Free" | 7 August 2026 |
| 9 | "The Labor Backrooms" | 21 August 2026 |

== Controversies ==
Due to its content, the series has been subject to numerous controversies, mostly due to the content of specific episodes, which, while satirical, has been perceived by some as defamatory or offensive. The series has also been accused of promoting disinformation.

A report from the University of New South Wales (UNSW) labelled the series "far-right", which Hanson has denied. Kurt Sengul and Jordan McSwiney of The Conversation assert that the series is used by Hanson and One Nation to normalise far-right ideas in mainstream culture under the guise of satire, "giv[ing] One Nation greater freedom to express views it would be reluctant to articulate in other settings."

=== Depictions of political violence ===
The series has come under scrutiny for its portrayals of violence against Australian political figures, particularly in the aftermath of the October 2026 car attack against Independent MP Helen Haines. Australian Federal Police commissioner Krissy Barrett has linked the content and rhetoric of Pauline Hanson's Please Explain to a rise in threats of violence against elected officials.

==== "Political Self-Destruction" ====
The episode "Political Self-Destruction" was condemned by the Australian Labor Party (ALP) for portraying Albanese murdering Foreign Minister Penny Wong with a knife.

==== "Under The Bus" ====
The episode "Under The Bus", published in 2023, shows Independent Senator Lidia Thorpe being run over by a bus driven by Pauline Hanson. Thorpe accused One Nation of platforming death threats against her, and said Hanson should be "thinking carefully about the example she is setting". Hanson refused to apologise to Thorpe and responded on Twitter that the cartoon will not be taken down.

==== "The State of Melbourne" ====
An episode titled "The State of Melbourne" was originally published in October 2024, depicting Albanese and former Victorian Premier Daniel Andrews being run over by a vehicle. The episode was subject to renewed scrutiny in October 2026, following an incident where Haines was deliberately run over by a car in Wangaratta. Users on social media called for Hanson and One Nation to take the episode down in light of the attack. Ayesha Jehangir, an academic at the University of New South Wales, asserted that the episode is "deeply disturbing" and "risks trivialising aggression" towards elected officials. Barrett considered "The State of Melbourne" as an example of content that was coarsening rhetoric and increasing violent threats against politicians. Hanson also refused to remove this episode.

The bus depicted in the cartoon is driven by the character Bluey from the popular children's TV show Bluey. The intellectual property rights to Bluey (owned by creators Ludo Studio) are being pursued. Hugh Marks, ABC managing director, appearing at Senate estimates on 25 October 2026, said that he had sought legal advice and that it was a clear breach of intellectual property, deserving of a cease and desist letter. He added that the use of Bluey in the cartoon was "both shocking and disrespectful to the children of Australia who love that character so much". The ABC has announced it will take legal action against One Nation in order to have the video taken down.

=== Other controversial episodes ===
==== "Voter Fraud" ====
In April 2022, the party was warned by the Australian Electoral Commission (AEC) over the episode "Voter Fraud", where Labor is shown rigging postal votes for the 2022 federal election to get elected (therefore falsely implying electoral fraud). In the episode, then-Opposition Leader (and later Prime Minister) Anthony Albanese is seen laying in bed sick with COVID-19 and is offered a soup that contains a live bat by Penny Wong. Wong hands Albanese electoral ballots (including one of his dog Toto), with Wong telling him to fill in the ballots to rig the election in favour of the Labor Party. The episode has been geoblocked in Australia on all of One Nation's official social media accounts upon request from the AEC. The AEC also warned the party for its lack of official authorisation at the end of the cartoons, which has since been added to every episode.

==== "The NDIS" ====
In April 2023, One Nation was also criticised for the episode "The NDIS", which mocks the National Disability Insurance Scheme (NDIS). In the episode, Opposition Leader Peter Dutton and Deputy Opposition Leader Sussan Ley visit a doctor who tells them that after the Liberal Party was "destroyed in Aston" (in reference to the party's historic loss at the 2023 Aston by-election), the party has been severely damaged but is now eligible for the NDIS. The doctor presents to them a video featuring Albanese and NDIS Minister Bill Shorten who mention perceivably bad things about the NDIS and repeatedly erroneously call the scheme the "National Disability Insurance Scam" before correcting themselves (implying that the NDIS is a scam).

==== "Gender Confusion" ====
In September 2024, the episode "Gender Confusion" was re-released, which removed Life Education Australia branding that was present in the original version of the episode. The revised episode's description claimed that "originally, this episode didn't get the attention it deserved due to some behind-the-scenes hiccups", likely as a result of a copyright claim by Life Education Australia. The episode still features the iconic giraffe puppet Healthy Harold, the mascot of Life Education Australia.

==== "The State of Queensland" ====
In June 2024, Australian conservationist Robert Irwin's lawyers threatened to sue Hanson over the episode "The State of Queensland", which criticises the state Labor government's policies on issues such as crime, native title, health and the economy. It features Irwin and cartoon character Bluey, a dog who is the titular character of a popular Australian children's animated television series set in Brisbane, who the Queensland government are using to promote tourism in the state. Hanson refused to take the video down and told Irwin to "lighten up".

==== "Don't Be Hastie" ====
In September 2026, Liberal MP Andrew Hastie labelled Pauline Hanson and Barnaby Joyce as "lying cowards" over the episode "Don't be Hastie", which labelled him as a "traitor" for giving evidence against military veteran Ben Roberts-Smith in a defamation trial against him. Hastie told them to either "own up" to the accusations of being a traitor or delete the video. Hastie stated that he would not take legal action against the statement, adding that he would not sue someone who was backed financially by Australia's richest person, Gina Rinehart. Pauline Hanson responded, stating she was "not calling him a traitor to this country" and it was simply a "satirical cartoon". Barnaby Joyce responded by saying that he was just being "emotional" because of the electoral risk One Nation posed on Hastie's electorate, Canning, referencing the Secret Harbour state by-election, which had One Nation win the seat of Secret Harbour, which overlaps Hastie's electorate.

Multiple politicians from different parties have also criticised Hanson's claims against Hastie. Tasmanian Senator Jacqui Lambie claimed that Hanson was an "angry little woman" and an attack on Hastie would mean an attack on all that served. Opposition Leader Angus Taylor said it was "wrong for the cartoon to stay on the internet" and Energy Minister Chris Bowen said that Hastie was a "patriot". The Returned and Services League of Australia also criticised Hanson over the episode.

==== "The Albo-rithm" ====
An episode released on 17 October 2026 titled "The Albo-rithm" was widely denounced for mocking Jacqui Lambie's physical health. Lambie had experienced vaginal prolapse in August caused by injuries she experienced while serving in armed forces. The cartoon in question depicts an animated Lambie coughing, implying a prolapse is occurring, along with "a crude sound effect that ridiculed her condition." The cartoon was condemned by various politicians across different parties for mocking women's health, including Independent MP Monique Ryan, Liberal MP Garth Hamilton, Shadow Treasuer Tim Wilson, Science Minister Tim Ayres, and Prime Minister Albanese. Lambie condemned the cartoon, stating that it made light of reproductive issues experienced by women, and accused Hanson of adding "hatred" and "spitefulness" to the public sphere.

The video went up without my actually seeing it, and I was not aware of the content of the video [...] I have spoken to the creator of that video. I've asked him to actually change it, and I respect people's views and opinions out there, and it wasn't as tastefully done as it could have been, and I do apologise for that. And I've already spoken to them about it and changed that

— Pauline Hanson apologising for "The Albo-rithm" on News24, 20 October 2026

Hanson initially defended the episode and refused to amend it or take it down, telling Lambie to "get over it" and emphasising that the work is "satire". However, the next day, Hanson apologised for the content of the cartoon and acknowledged that it was not "tastefully" done. She admitted that she had not watched the episode before it was published, and was unaware of the extent to which the episode mocked Lambie's health,. Hanson announced that the episode will be altered; the following day, an edited version of the episode without Jacqui Lambie's character was released on Twitter and YouTube. Mark Nicholson has refused to apologise to Lambie stating that it was his job to "pick on people who are in the public realm."

== Colouring book ==
A colouring book based on the series has been created. On 28 October 2026 it was reported that ON staff had handed out copies of the book to children at the annual agricultural show at Mount Gambier, South Australia, on 23–24 October. As well as unflattering drawings of politicians and other living people, the book included a picture of Bluey and Robert Irwin being held up by a crocodile wielding a knife. A local parent complained and the matter has been escalated.

== Legal action ==
As mentioned above, the animated children's TV character of Bluey has been used in two episodes ("The State of Melbourne" and "The State of Queensland") and a colouring book. On 28 October 2026 the ABC again called on ON to remove the videos, but Hanson denied that they were a breach of intellectual property. The ABC is the licensed holder of copyright in Australia, but as Ludo Studio holds the intellectual property rights, the two organisations would need to work together to take legal action.
