= A Super Progressive Movie =

- Official release poster
- Directed by: Sebastian Peart
- Written by: Mark Nicholson, Sebastian Peart
- Based on: Pauline Hanson's Please Explain
- Produced by: James Ashby, Sean Bell, Alex Jones
- Starring: Pauline Hanson, Mark Nicholson, Sebastian Peart
- Production company: Stepmates Studios
- Release date: 26 January 2026
- Running time: 86 minutes
- Country: Australia

A Super Progressive Movie is a 2026 Australian animated anti-LGBTQ satirical comedy film directed by Sebastian Peart. It is a feature-length version of the Pauline Hanson's Please Explain animated series produced by Stepmates Studios for One Nation, an Australian far-right populist political party founded and led by Pauline Hanson.

== Plot ==
After a culture war in which "the colonisers" were defeated, Australia has become a progressive utopia centred on Naarm (formerly Melbourne), shielded from the outside world by a rainbow force field. White straight men form a permanent underclass.

Pete, a white man, is sentenced to death for failing to laugh at a joke told by Princess Stacey. As his execution begins, the rainbow shield flickers. An Aboriginal elder, Murray, rushes Pete and the royal party underground and reveals the truth: the Progressives in fact lost the culture war, the utopia is an illusion maintained inside the shield, and their ultimate weapon—the Victimhood—was torn apart and lost. Citing an ancestral prophecy, Murray declares that a chosen one must recover the Victimhood from Uluru. Pete assumes the prophecy refers to him; the others insist it refers to Murray, with Pete brought along to carry the bags.

The group leaves the bubble and crosses the real Australia, encountering "bush pigs", police, and a near-blind conspiracy-theorist truck driver named Bill, who drives them toward Uluru. On the journey their assumptions unravel: the ordinary Australians they meet are not the racists they expected, Stacey is revealed to be pregnant by Social Justice Warrior Lance, and Murray, exposed to alcohol and grievance, grows increasingly consumed by self-pity.

Murray reaches Uluru first and seizes what he believes is the Victimhood, but it proves to be a counterfeit. Bill's fuel-laden truck ignites and Uluru explodes, seemingly killing Pete and costing Murray his legs. Pete, having survived the blast, is visited by the Rainbow Serpent, who tempts him into donning the real Victimhood. He returns to Melbourne transformed into the "One True Victim", and a cult of forced pity sweeps the nation. The Victimhood, however, is slowly killing him; only Pauline Hanson can free him of it, and Albo—Anthony Albanese, revealed as the true villain, addicted to the power Pete's suffering grants him—moves to execute her.

Murray dies and meets his ancestors, who teach him that his people were "survivors, not victims", and returns resolved. He saves Hanson, frees Pete from the Victimhood, and Albo is defeated. The Victimhood is locked away in a museum. Under Prime Minister Hanson, Australia thrives; Pete becomes Mayor of Melbourne, Stacey and Lance raise a family, and Murray reconciles his past with his future.

== Release ==
The film was released on 26 January 2026, in line with Australia Day.

Parliament of Australia cancelled an event which was to include a showing the film trailer, never-before-seen scenes, and a Q&A with the film development team. The event was considered likely to cause offence and therefore failed to meet the requirements outlined in the Australian Parliament House events policy. The event was then booked at an alternate location.

== Music ==
On 26 January 2026, Australian singer and right-wing political commentator Holly Valance released the single "Kiss Kiss (XX) My Arse" after seeing a rough cut of the film. Within hours of the song's release, it reached the number one position on the Australian iTunes songs chart.

== Reception ==
The film was panned by critics. Rob Harris of The Sydney Morning Herald opined "[t]he same points are hammered again and again until the satire starts to feel less like comedy and more like a very long argument with cartoons attached." Bianca Farmakis of The Australian stated in her review: "[w]hat could've been a sharp, entertaining satire quickly collapses into repetitive quips that feel lifted directly off the Facebook comments of a tinfoil-hat conspiracist" Michelle Sheppard of QNews described the film as "[a] tantrum animated in bright colours, mistaking volume for insight". The film's poor animation quality was also criticised.

The Australian Classification Board published a report critical of the film's subject matter, stating: "The entire film is full of crude humour, which trivialises the fight for equality and issues, including the rights of minority groups and those facing discrimination, including First Nations people, the LGBTQIA+ community, differently abled people, etc." The report also denounced the film's mockery of topics such as generational trauma, body dysmorphia, gender transition, and animal cruelty.
