= Jacqui Lambie =

Australian politician (born 1971)

Senator Jacqui Lambie
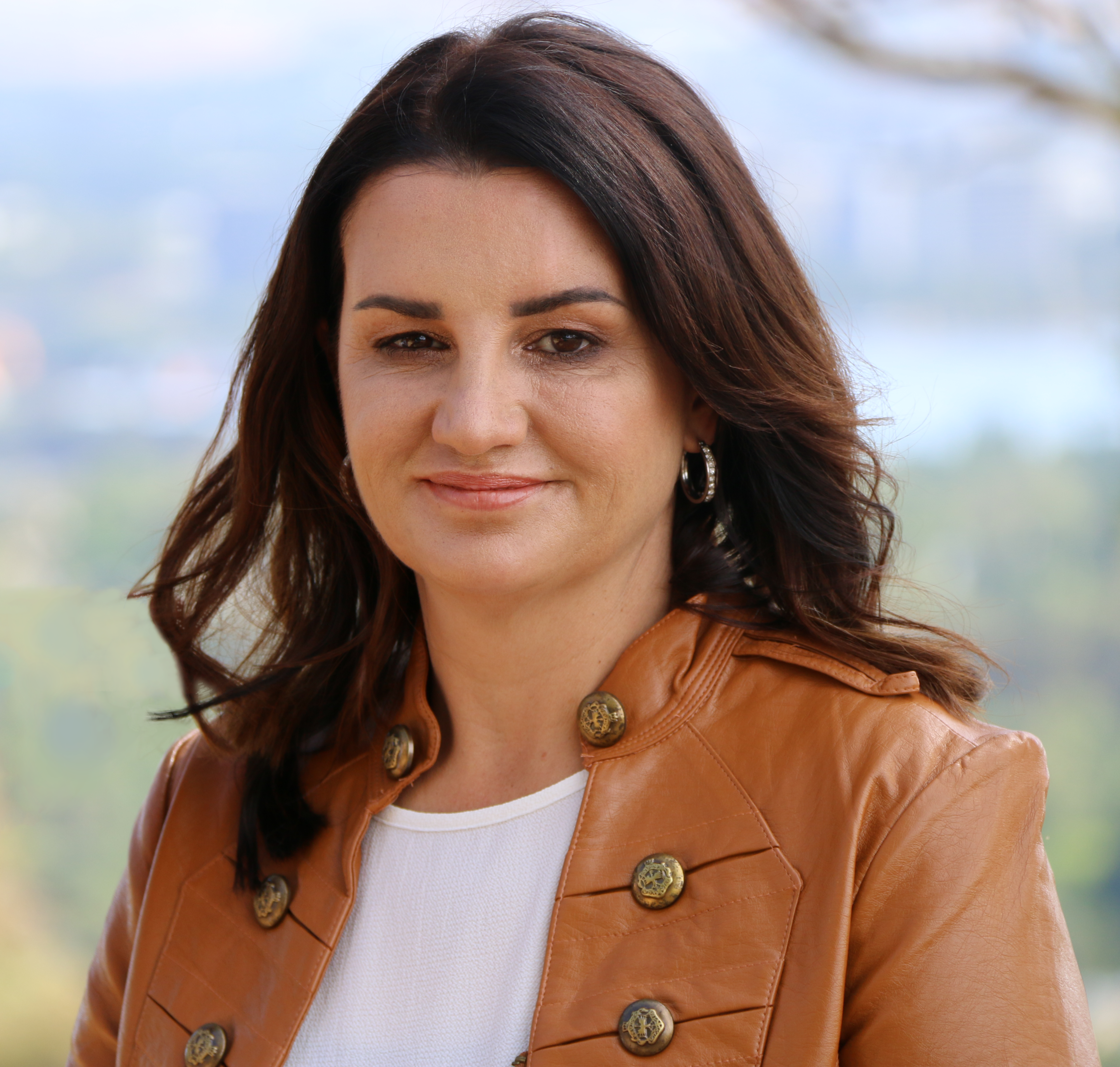
- Lambie in 2017

President of the Jacqui Lambie Network
- Incumbent
- Assumed office July 2024

Leader of the Jacqui Lambie Network
- Incumbent
- Assumed office 14 May 2015
- Preceded by: Position established

Deputy Leader of Palmer United in the Senate
- In office 1 July – 19 November 2014
- Leader: Glenn Lazarus
- Preceded by: Position established
- Succeeded by: Position abolished

Senator for Tasmania
- Incumbent
- Assumed office 1 July 2019
- Preceded by: Steve Martin
- In office 1 July 2014 – 14 November 2017
- Preceded by: Lin Thorp
- Succeeded by: Steve Martin

Personal details
- Born: Jacquiline Louise Lambie; 26 February 1971 (age 55) Ulverstone, Tasmania, Australia
- Citizenship: Australia; United Kingdom (until 2019)
- Party: Jacqui Lambie Network (since 2015)
- Other political affiliations: Palmer United (2013–2014); Independent (2012–2013; 2014–2015); Liberal (2011–2012); Labor (2008)
- Children: 2
- Education: Devonport High School
- Website: Official website

Military service
- Allegiance: Australia
- Branch/service: Australian Army
- Years of service: 1989–2000
- Rank: Corporal
- Unit: Military Police (1996–2000); Transport Corps (1990–1995)

Jacquiline Louise Lambie (born 26 February 1971) is an Australian politician and former soldier who is the leader and founder of the Jacqui Lambie Network (JLN). She has been a Senator for Tasmania since 2019, and was previously a Senator from 2014 to 2017.

Lambie grew up in public housing in Devonport before serving as a corporal in the Australian Army. Attempting to seek Liberal preselection after joining the party in 2011, and previously working as a staff member of Labor senator Nick Sherry, Lambie joined the Palmer United Party (PUP), led by Australian billionaire Clive Palmer. She was elected to the Senate at the 2013 federal election. Her term began in July 2014. Lambie received national prominence for her intense grassroots campaign and subsequently her display of aggressive and vociferous parliamentary behaviour, championing issues concerning foreign affairs, veterans' affairs, youth unemployment, and the promotion of racism and Islamophobia. After persistent internal divisions, in November 2014, Lambie resigned from the Palmer United Party to sit in the Senate as an independent.

In May 2015, she formed the Jacqui Lambie Network political party with herself as leader. She was elected to a six-year term in her own right at the 2016 federal election (a double dissolution). In November 2017, she was revealed to hold Australian-British dual citizenship, having inherited British citizenship from her Scottish-born father. As part of the parliamentary eligibility crisis, she announced her resignation on 14 November 2017. After a recount, she was replaced by Devonport Mayor Steve Martin, who had been second on the JLN ticket in the 2016 federal election. He survived a challenge to his own eligibility, on a different constitutional ground, but refused to step down so as to create a casual Senate vacancy to which Lambie could be appointed. She later expelled him from the party for disloyalty.

Lambie was re-elected to the Senate at the 2019 election, and the 2025 election.

== Early life ==
Lambie, a Palawa woman, was born in the town of Ulverstone in north-western Tasmania. Her parents separated when she was 13, and she was raised in a public housing estate in Devonport, attending Devonport High School.

Lambie was one of just four members of the 46th Parliament of Australia who did not finish high school, the others being Julie Collins, Llew O'Brien and Terry Young.

== Military career ==
=== Australian Army (1989–2000) ===
Lambie enlisted in the Australian Army in 1989. She completed her recruit training while unknowingly pregnant with her first child. Her pregnancy was not recognised until four months later; army medical officers had attributed her menstruation stopping to the stress of training.

After basic training, she was assigned to the Royal Australian Corps of Transport in 1990. She remained with the Transport Corps for five years before being transferred to the Royal Australian Corps of Military Police, where she worked for another five years, achieving the rank of Corporal.

During a field exercise in July 1997, Lambie sustained a back injury resulting in long-term detriments to her spine. After physiotherapy and medical interventions, she was unable to regain operational fitness and was discharged on medical grounds (thoracic pain) in 2000. This prompted her to pursue a claim for a military pension from the Department of Veterans' Affairs (DVA).

She has since been an advocate for veterans with the Returned and Services League of Australia and involved in fundraising with the Burnie Chamber of Commerce, the Country Women's Association and Rotary.

=== Dispute with the Department of Veterans' Affairs (2000–2006) ===
The Department of Veterans' Affairs (DVA) initially rejected her application for compensation, but subsequently approved it and put her on a military disability pension. She later applied for compensation for depression related to her back pain, which was also initially rejected. The DVA hired a private investigation firm to conduct five hours of surveillance on her activities within her home. On the basis of this surveillance, the department concluded that she was a malingerer, cancelling her military pension and coverage of her medical care.

Lambie fought the department's conclusion for five years, during which time she was accepted for a Centrelink disability pension. In 2006, the Administrative Appeals Tribunal was about to rule on whether the video evidence was admissible in her case when DVA abandoned its use of the video and accepted that Lambie was entitled to compensation. The tribunal's Deputy President, Justice Christopher Wright, concluded that "it is likely that even greater improvement would have been achieved a long time ago if her medical treatments, which were initially funded by the respondent, had not been terminated in 2001".

== Political career ==
=== Early political career (2008–2012) ===
Lambie's political involvement began in 2008 when she began working for Tasmanian Labor senator Nick Sherry.

In November 2011, she joined the Liberal Party of Australia and later decided to run for preselection for the Division of Braddon. She subsequently left the Liberal Party, saying that the Liberals are a "boys' club", and she joined to "infiltrate" them to see what she could learn about politics.

In 2012, Lambie sold her house to help fund her run as an independent, before turning to the newly formed Palmer United Party founded by billionaire Clive Palmer – as she said "I just didn't have the money like the big players did for advertising."

=== Senate (2013–2017; 2019–present) ===
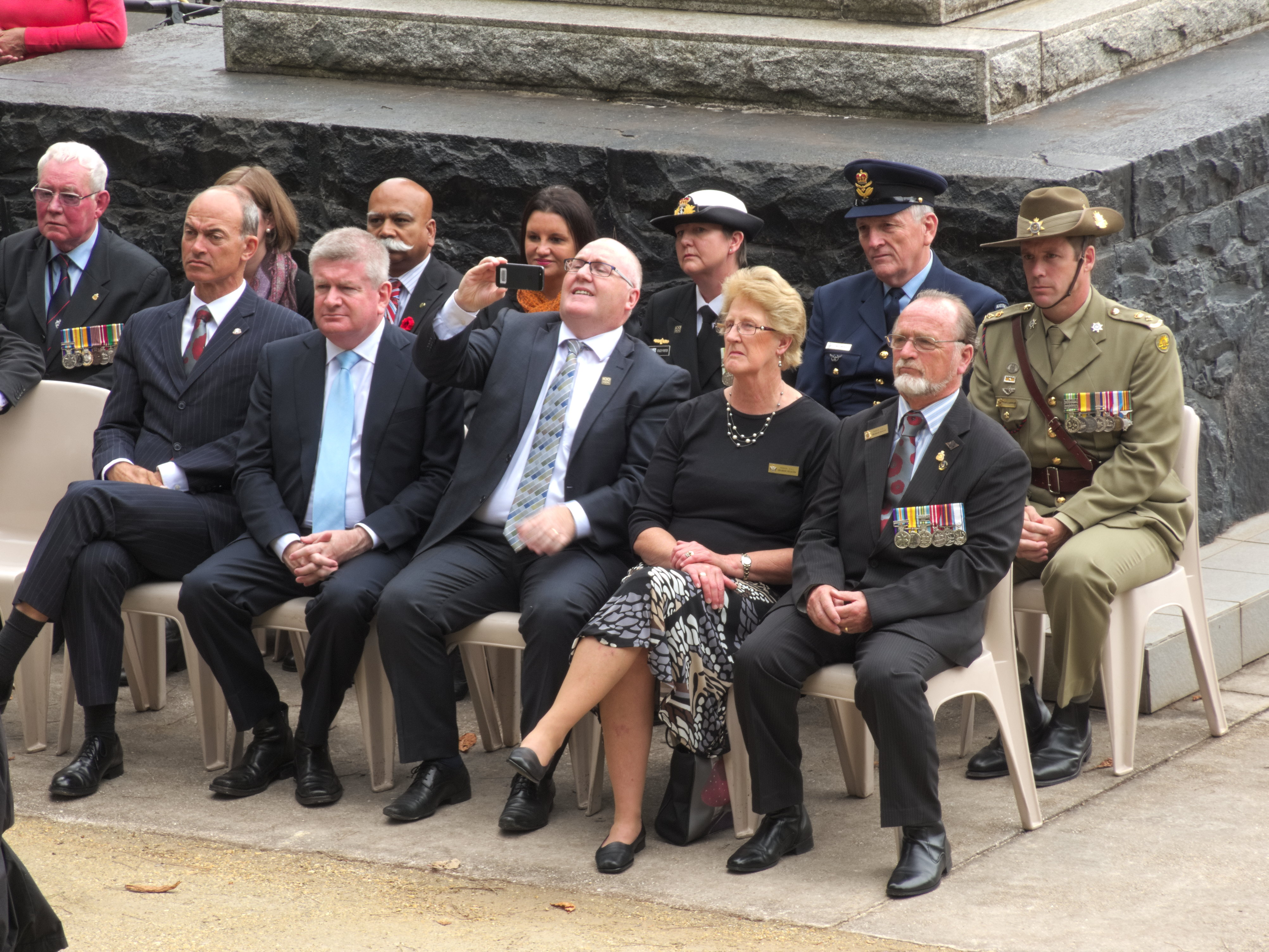
Lambie (back row; middle) attending the unveiling ceremony for memorial wall and the Corporal Cameron Baird plinth in Burnie, Tasmania

In the 2013 federal election, Lambie won Tasmania's sixth Senate seat as a candidate for the Palmer United Party, receiving 6.58% of first preference votes. She has credited the final result of her win to "the big man upstairs" – referring not to Palmer, but to God: "Once it gets to that point, it's up to God upstairs. There's not much else I can do about it."

On 24 November 2014, Lambie resigned from the Palmer United Party, announcing that she would remain in the Senate as an independent. Her resignation followed several weeks of disagreements with party leader Clive Palmer.

In April 2015, she applied to register a political party called the Jacqui Lambie Network. In May 2015, the party was registered with the Australian Electoral Commission, with Lambie as its leader. She was re-elected to the Senate in the 2016 Australian federal election under the banner of her own party, the Jacqui Lambie Network.

On 14 November 2017, Lambie announced her resignation from the Senate, after revealing she held both British and Australian nationality, prohibited under Section 44 of the Australian Constitution. She stated in her resignation that she wished to return to federal politics, and that if Justine Keay was forced to resign from her seat of Braddon over her citizenship status, that she would consider running, but did not nominate for the 2018 Braddon by-election.

In 2018, the High Court ruled that Lambie's running mate Steve Martin would replace her in the Senate, following a recount. Lambie expected Martin to immediately resign, which would have cleared the way for her to be appointed to fill the resulting casual vacancy and return to the Senate. She claimed that "personal morality" and loyalty dictated that Martin stand down. A party spokesman contended that Tasmanians intended for Lambie to hold the seat, and there was "an opportunity for that vote to be restored" if Martin resigned. When Martin refused to do so, Lambie expelled him from the party. In a letter to Martin, Lambie accused him of failing to uphold the JLN's values of "mateship, respect and integrity".

Lambie was re-elected to the Senate at the 2019 election. In the midst of the debate of the government bill Ensuring Integrity Bill in Parliament, Lambie threatened to vote for the bill if John Setka, the secretary of the Victorian branch of Construction, Forestry, Maritime, Mining and Energy Union (CFMEU), did not resign as head of the branch. She even invited Setka over to her Tasmanian home for Sunday roast, in a bid to convince Setka to resign. She eventually voted against the bill after her amendments were rejected by the government.

In September 2026, Lambie criticised fellow Senator Pauline Hanson over an episode of her Please Explain cartoon, which labelled Liberal Party MP Andrew Hastie as a "traitor". She called Hanson a "coward" and an "angry little woman". Lambie was subsequently targeted in the following episode after she had disclosed to the Senate she suffered from vaginal prolapse as a result of injuries sustained during her military service. Hanson initially told Lambie to “lighten up” claiming the series was satire, before apologising the following day and removing the video to edit out the reference. Co-founder of Stepmate Studios, the creative agency that produces the cartoon, Mark Nicholson has refused to apologise to Lambie stating that it was his job to "pick on people who are in the public realm."

== Political views ==
=== Higher education ===
In 2020, Lambie opposed the Liberal Party's university reform bill due to her belief it would harm the mental health and economic opportunities of low-income students. She made her position clear when addressing the Senate, saying she would "refuse to be the vote that tells poor kids out there … no matter how gifted, no matter how determined you are, you might as well dream a little cheaper, because you're never going to make it, because you can't afford it".

=== Raising alleged abuse within the army ===
In February 2016, Lambie raised the matter of former soldiers who claim to have suffered abuse, calling for an inquiry into cover-ups and Lieutenant General David Morrison's involvement.

=== Foreign policy and defence ===
In August 2014, Lambie expressed her belief that China could invade Australia: "If anybody thinks that we should have a national security and defence policy which ignores the threat of a Chinese Communist invasion – you're delusional and got rocks in your head ... The Communist Chinese military capacity and level of threat to the western world democracies is at an unprecedented and historical high." Her comments incurred a rebuke from the Premier of Tasmania Will Hodgman. She later added Indonesia as a potential military threat. Lambie has made comments suggesting her support for potential reintroduction of national service, stating "It's time to teach [our youth] some respect, loyalty and honour."

In October 2015 she declared her opposition to the China–Australia Free Trade Agreement, saying she considers the Chinese government to be "push[ing] totalitarian ideologies", "anti-democratic" and "a bully, thief, liar and international human rights abuser".

In October 2014, Lambie stated in a radio interview with ABC Radio National that she liked Vladimir Putin, saying: "I think he has very strong leadership. He has great values. He's certainly doing his bit to stamp out terrorism and I guess you've got to pay the man for that." In February 2015, Lambie called for the reintroduction of the death penalty for Australian citizens who leave the country to become foreign fighters.

In October 2016, she called for a pre-emptive pardon for any defence personnel accused of war crimes against the Taliban or Islamic State, on the grounds that Taliban and Islamic State fighters were not entitled to the protection of the rules of war or international human rights because of their "subhuman behaviour and vile, disgusting culture and ideology".

=== Islam ===
In September 2014, Lambie announced plans to introduce a private member's bill aimed at banning the burqa in Australia. Constitutional expert Professor George Williams described the law as "unworkable, it would frankly be a bit silly". She also attacked supporters of Islamic sharia law, describing them as "maniacs and depraved humans" who will not stop committing "cold-blooded butchery and rapes until every woman in Australia wears a burka". When asked to explain her understanding of sharia law in an interview, she was unable to and instead said "it obviously involves terrorism". According to ABC political reporter Andrew Greene, some commentators described the interview as a "train wreck". In February 2017, she introduced a private member's bill which would amend the Criminal Code Act 1995 to make it illegal to wear full face coverings in public places when a terrorism threat declaration is in force, unless it was necessary for certain purposes.

In January 2017, she said that Australia should follow Donald Trump's lead in his order to restrict entry of citizens of certain Muslim-majority countries to the US. She called for deporting from Australia all Muslims who supported Sharia law, as well as deporting everyone on the ASIO terror watch list, or at least charging them with treason or sedition.

In an interview with ABC News in 2018, Lambie distanced herself from her previous views on Sharia law, stating that she "didn't want to be divisive" and that she was influenced by "a previous advisor that was really driving that in". Following her involvement in the TV show Go Back to Where You Came From in 2018 where she was placed in a Syrian warzone, Lambie shifted towards a pro-refugee stance, stating that "the discussion [about accepting more refugees] needs to be on the political table".

On 22 August 2024, Lambie was accused by fellow Senator Mehreen Faruqi of anti Muslim sentiment during a parliamentary debate over Australia's granting of visas for Palestinians. "I had to sit here and listen to Senator (Jacqui) Lambie attack and vilify Muslims and she couldn't even pronounce my name", she claimed on SBS News.

=== The Greens ===
In October 2013 she criticised the Australian Greens, accusing them of having "destroyed all hope in Tasmania" and saying that the party should be subject to a Senate inquiry over the state's high unemployment rate. In July 2015, she likened The Greens to Islamic State in that "both those groups would like us to go back and live in the dark ages ... They'd like us to go live back in caves with candles and eat tofu."

In 2020, Lambie worked alongside the Greens in criticising a bill that would 'weaken' political donation laws.

== Policies ==
=== Royal Commission into Veteran Suicide ===
In response to a Change.org petition organised by Julie-Ann Finney, whose son David Finney took his own life after a crippling battle with Post-Traumatic Stress injury, Lambie called for a Royal Commission into Veteran Suicide. As of 20 April 2021 the petition had over 400,000 signatures.

On 5 February 2020, the Morrison Government announced their intention to appoint a National Commissioner for Defence and Veteran Suicide Prevention to inquire into the deaths by suicide of serving and former ADF members.

Lambie criticised the Government's plan in a Dissenting Report, noting that "The families of veterans who have taken their own lives support a Royal Commission. The institutions who are being blamed for those suicides support a National Commissioner." Two bills related to the Commissioner were introduced into Parliament by the Attorney-General on 27 August 2020, the "National Commissioner for Defence and Veteran Suicide Prevention Bill 2020", and the "National Commissioner for Defence and Veteran Suicide Prevention (Consequential Amendments) Bill 2020". Magistrate Bernadette Boss was appointed as the first (interim) National Commissioner for Defence and Veteran Suicide Prevention on 1 October 2020.

On 22 March 2021, both chambers of Parliament passed motions in support of the royal commission. On 8 July 2021, a Royal Commission into Defence and Veteran Suicide in Australia was established.

=== Political donations ===
Lambie introduced a bill to the Australian Senate in February 2020 that proposes to tighten political donations laws. The bill seeks to amend current laws that permit political donations under $14,300 to not be disclosed. Lambie has proposed lowering this threshold to $2,500.

The bill also proposes to introduce electoral expenditure accounts for organisations that run political campaigns. This will compel parties and others to disclose the source of any money they spend on their electoral campaigns.

=== Australian manufacturing ===
In early 2020, Lambie started a campaign to support Australian manufacturing with concerns about Australia's reliance on foreign imported products, she believes these concerns are a threat to Australia's economic sovereignty; magnified with the advent of COVID-19.

=== Foreign interference ===
Lambie has said on her website "It's about time that the people in Parliament woke up to China's attempts to infiltrate our economy and our democracy." Her concerns are echoed by Duncan Lewis, formerly the Director-General of Security at ASIO. There is ongoing debate over whether Liberal MP Gladys Liu's ties to the Chinese Communist Party are appropriate, with the Labor party arguing she may not be 'fit and proper' to sit as an MP.

== Television ==
Year	Title	Notes
2016	Kitchen Cabinet	Interviewee
2017	Have You Been Paying Attention?	Guest quiz master
2018	Tonightly with Tom Ballard	
2018	Go Back to Where You Came From	
2019	I'm a Celebrity...Get Me Out of Here	Contestant
2019	Hughesy, We Have a Problem	Celebrity problem
2021	Big Deal	Interviewee

== Personal life ==
Lambie is single, with two children. She gave birth to her first son Brentyn at age 18 in 1989, the product of her relationship with a high school boyfriend, after her enlistment for the Army. She met John Milverton while working in the Royal Australian Corps of Transport. They began a de facto marriage, where Milverton formally adopted Brentyn, and also went on to have another son, Dylan, born in 1992. Milverton and Lambie separated shortly before her discharge from the Army in 2000. In August 2015, she went public with her 21-year-old son's battle with methamphetamine addiction. She has also stated that she was addicted to pain medication and attempted suicide once.

Lambie lives in the city of Burnie, on the North-West Coast of Tasmania. She has jokingly described her perfect man as having "heaps of cash" and "a package between their legs". Her comments were met with much ire, and she later declared it to be her most embarrassing moment.

In 2014, Lambie described herself as "Catholic; I'm religious" — citing it as a reason for rejecting an invitation to visit a Sydney mosque.

=== Aboriginal ancestry ===
In her first speech to Parliament in 2014, Lambie stated that, through her mother's family, she shares "blood, culture, and history" with Aboriginal Australians, as a descendant of Mannalargenna, an Aboriginal Tasmanian leader. She later provided a family tree to ABC TV's Australian Story claiming descent from Margaret Briggs, a granddaughter of Mannalargenna who married into the Hite family. In 2002, the Administrative Appeals Tribunal had ruled that descent from Margaret Briggs was sufficient to meet the Aboriginal ancestry requirements for ATSIC elections.

Lambie's claims of Indigenous descent have been questioned by several sources, including Australian Story, the Tasmanian Pioneer Index, and Clyde Mansell, chairman of the Aboriginal Land Council of Tasmania. Another Tasmanian elder, Roy Maynard, accepted her self-identification as Aboriginal, and criticised Mansell for doubting her claims. The Parliamentary Library of Australia includes Lambie on its list of Indigenous parliamentarians.
