= John Setka =

Australian trade unionist

Victorian-Tasmanian Secretary of the CFMEU C&G division
- In office 2012 – 12 July 2024

Personal details
- Born: 1 September 1964 (age 62) Melbourne, Australia
- Known for: Former Leader of the CFMEU Victorian-Tasmanian Branch C&G division

John Setka (born 1 September 1964) is a former Australian trade unionist.

Until 12 July 2024, he was the secretary of the Victorian-Tasmanian division of the Construction, Forestry, Maritime, and Energy Union for 12 years. The Victorian-Tasmanian division administers the South Australian division under a temporary arrangement.

He is a controversial figure in the Australian trade union movement. He is known for his strong support at a grassroots level, especially among the rank and file of the CFMEU. His supporters regard him as a strong advocate against political, legal, and industrial opponents; the national secretary of the union, Christy Cain has called him one of the "most fair dinkum union people in this country".

On the other hand, the Courts have upheld the description of him as a thug, while Setka's political opponents have derided him as a bully, and criticized his purported stance that it can be necessary to break the law to pursue union interests. He has also faced strong criticism for alleged public remarks on the topic of domestic violence, and a guilty plea for harassing his ex-wife via text, issues that contributed to his formal expulsion from the Australian Labor Party in 2019. (Note: Union officials in Australia are usually members of the ALP, including CFMMEU officials)

In recent years Setka's personal life has been the subject of considerable media attention. His marital breakdown, and associated legal issues, have led to additional public criticism.

== Early life and education ==
John Setka was born to a Croatian family. His father was a labourer named Bob Setka, who survived the West Gate Bridge collapse in 1970, one of the worst industrial accidents in Victoria's history.

Setka began working as a labourer at the age of 19. He began involvement with trade unionism first after joining the Builders Labourers Federation. (Note: The BLF is the predecessor organisation to the CFMMEU) He was mentored by state secretary John Cummins.

== Union career ==
Under Setka's leadership, media commentators have noted the "pervasive power of the CFMEU over construction companies".

In 2012, he sued the opposition leader Tony Abbott. Setka claimed that Abbott defamed him by suggesting that he was involved in intimidation, extortion and was a self-confessed thug. Setka lost. The action came to an end in 2015, when further appeals were ruled out, with costs being awarded against Setka.

In 2015, Setka encouraged workers within the Rail, Tram and Bus Union to strike during the Australian Football League finals to "use finals fever to their advantage in their bitter industrial fight with Metro Trains and Yarra Trams". The decision was criticised by Victorian Labor minister Jacinta Allan due to the strike's impact on businesses.

Setka openly criticised the former prime minister Kevin Rudd in 2018. During a speech, he said: 'he's one of the worst fucking Labor PMs we've ever had ... (because) ... he kept the ABCC and coercive powers and he wants to talk about workers and the trade union movement.'

Setka is known for his public condemnation of the ABCC and its staff. In 2017, he publicly threatened to target the home addresses of building watchdog inspectors and lobby local footy clubs so their "kids will be ashamed of who their parents are". On the other hand, he is regarded by many in the union movement, especially in the industrial left faction, to be a robust and genuine union activist. He has in the past had strong support from Luke Hilakari, among other prominent leaders in the trade union movement.

It was reported in 2019 by The Sydney Morning Herald that Setka maintained a friendship with underworld figure Mick Gatto. The Age reported that in a speech to the Union's national executive in June 2019 he demanded rhetorically to know what the problem was with being friends with Gatto. "If you don’t like it "tough f---ing luck, too f---ing bad"".

In August 2022, a unanimous ballot at the South Australian branch of the CFMMEU brought about a co-operative administration arrangement between that branch, and the Victorian-Tasmanian division led by Setka.

He said in February 2024 that he will not stand as Victorian-Tasmanian Secretary of the CFMEU for another year, beyond 2024.

On 12 July 2024, Setka announced his resignation from CFMEU. In a statement on July 12, 2024, the union said Setka's departure was because of “ongoing and relentless stories written with multiple allegations about this great union". When asked about this resignation, Prime Minister Anthony Albanese responded "good" and "John Setka has no legitimate place in the Labor movement".

=== Blackmail charges ===
In 2015, Setka was arrested and forced to appear in court to face blackmail charges. On the day of his court appearance, around 2,000 CFMEU members and other unionists gathered outside the Melbourne Magistrates' Court on 8 December to show their support. Three years later, the Victorian prosecution office dropped the charges, a decision that the Magistrate Charles Rozecwajg described in court as 'very sensible. Setka spoke outside of court saying that he had been the victim of a witch hunt.

He later sued a group of executives from the company Boral, successfully obtaining a settlement after alleging they conspired in the tort of malicious prosecution.

=== Expulsion from Labor ===
In June 2019, Setka attended a meeting of his union's national executive. It was reported by The Age that during that meeting, he made comments to the effect that the work of Rosie Batty had left men with fewer rights. Setka publicly denied that he made the comments.

Following the reporting of these comments, the Australian Labor Party leader Anthony Albanese proposed to expel Setka from the Labor Party.

Setka publicly objected to this attempt at expulsion, and claimed that there was "dirty politics at work". He made an implicit claim that he was the victim of a witch hunt, driven by his "view of where the union should be in regards to the ALP, and some people probably don't share that view".

Reactions to Setka's behavior and his potential expulsion were mixed. The CFMEU Victoria branch (that he controlled) threatened to cut financial support to the ALP if he was expelled. The NSW and WA branches also expressed their support. Numerous politicians, as well as the ACTU secretary Sally McManus called on Setka to step down.

Additional pressure upon Setka arose after the Senate crossbencher Jacqui Lambie threatened political blackmail, making a demand that he step down or she would vote for a bill strongly opposed by the union movement. (Note: The Coalition government's Ensuring Integrity Bill) This threat was made during a lunch invitation at her Tasmanian house.

In the midst of these events, Setka pleaded guilty to using a carriage service to harass a person in the Melbourne magistrates court. The victim was identified as his wife at the time, Emma Walters. Following this, more than a dozen individual unions, including the three biggest in the country, renewed their calls for Setka to step aside. Some factional allies of Setka, like the then head of the RTBU Luba Grigorovitch, maintained their support.

In July, Setka applied for an injunction at the Victorian Supreme Court to stop the expulsion decision. He argued at court that the ALP national executive did not have the legal power to expel him, and that it was instead a matter for the Victorian State party branch. The court decided in August 2019 that the motion to expel Mr Setka was 'outside the court's jurisdiction', and that it 'could not interfere with internal decisions of voluntary unincorporated associations'. In October he commenced an appeal of this decision, before withdrawing. After its withdrawal, the ALP immediately expelled him.

== Personal life ==
John Setka has three children. He is married, but separated, to Emma Walters, a former industrial lawyer at Slater and Gordon. The pair met while Emma was working as a staff member at the union prior to her legal career. Reportedly, Ms Walters was once considered for an ALP upper house seat.

=== Marriage to Emma Walters ===
In 2017, Emma Walters joined the firm Gordon Legal as a union relationship manager. The following year the CFMMEU became a client.

In January 2019, it was reported in the Herald Sun that Setka was charged after an argument with his wife on boxing day. Police had been called to intervene, and the case was investigated by the Victoria Police family violence investigation unit.

In June 2019, Setka pleaded guilty to magistrates court charges that he had used a carriage service to harass a person. He was ordered to complete a men's behavioral program, and a 12 month good behavior bond was imposed. Outside of court, his wife identified herself as the victim for the relevant charge. She was pictured holding his hand in support during the court process.

In August 2021, The Age reported that Walters had made a statement to police alleging that after an argument a week earlier, Setka had hit her head against a table and left her with a bruised forehead. She said in her sworn statement: "John was out of control. He hit my head against the table about five times." In an interview to 9News that month, Walters stated she had covered up for Setka, and she would not be doing so anymore.

In September 2022, the Herald Sun reported that an anonymous note had been delivered to her home containing profanity, abuse, and threats. The identity of the note's sender is unknown, although the police said they were investigating the incident. In a quote to the paper, Emma stated that she is seeking a divorce, wants custody of the children, restraints on John, and for him to undertake therapy. She accused John of coercive control. He refused comment when contacted by the paper. Through his PR agency, he described the person who sent the anonymous letter as "a coward".

In October 2022, The Age reported that Setka had been accused of using Richmond footballer Dustin Martin to pressure his estranged wife. In a video contained in the article, Martin says hello to their children, and invites them to lunch when he returns from a holiday.

In November 2022, 7News reported that Walters had moved to Adelaide with two of her children to escape Setka. Since moving two months earlier, it was reported that she had moved home four times in an effort to evade him. Walters also made allegations that intervention orders had repeatedly been breached. She expressed concern about Setka's control of the Adelaide branch of the CFMEU, claiming it would mean that he would spend more time in that city, and stated that she was seeking a no-contact order between Setka and her children.

In 2023, Walters was arrested after reportedly trying to kill Setka. Police accuse Walters of purchasing sedatives with the intention of using them to kill her ex-husband.
