= Operation Gallant Phoenix =

Military intelligence history in Syria and Iraq

- Part of the War against the Islamic State
Date	1 January 2013; 13 years ago
Location	Joint Training Centre Jordan, Zarqa in Jordan, Iraq and Syria

Belligerents
Peshmerga; YPG; Australia; Bahrain; Belgium; Denmark; Egypt; France; Germany; Iraq; Israel; Italy; Jordan; Netherlands; New Zealand; Portugal; Saudi Arabia; Singapore; Spain; Sweden; United Arab Emirates; United Kingdom; United States	Islamic State

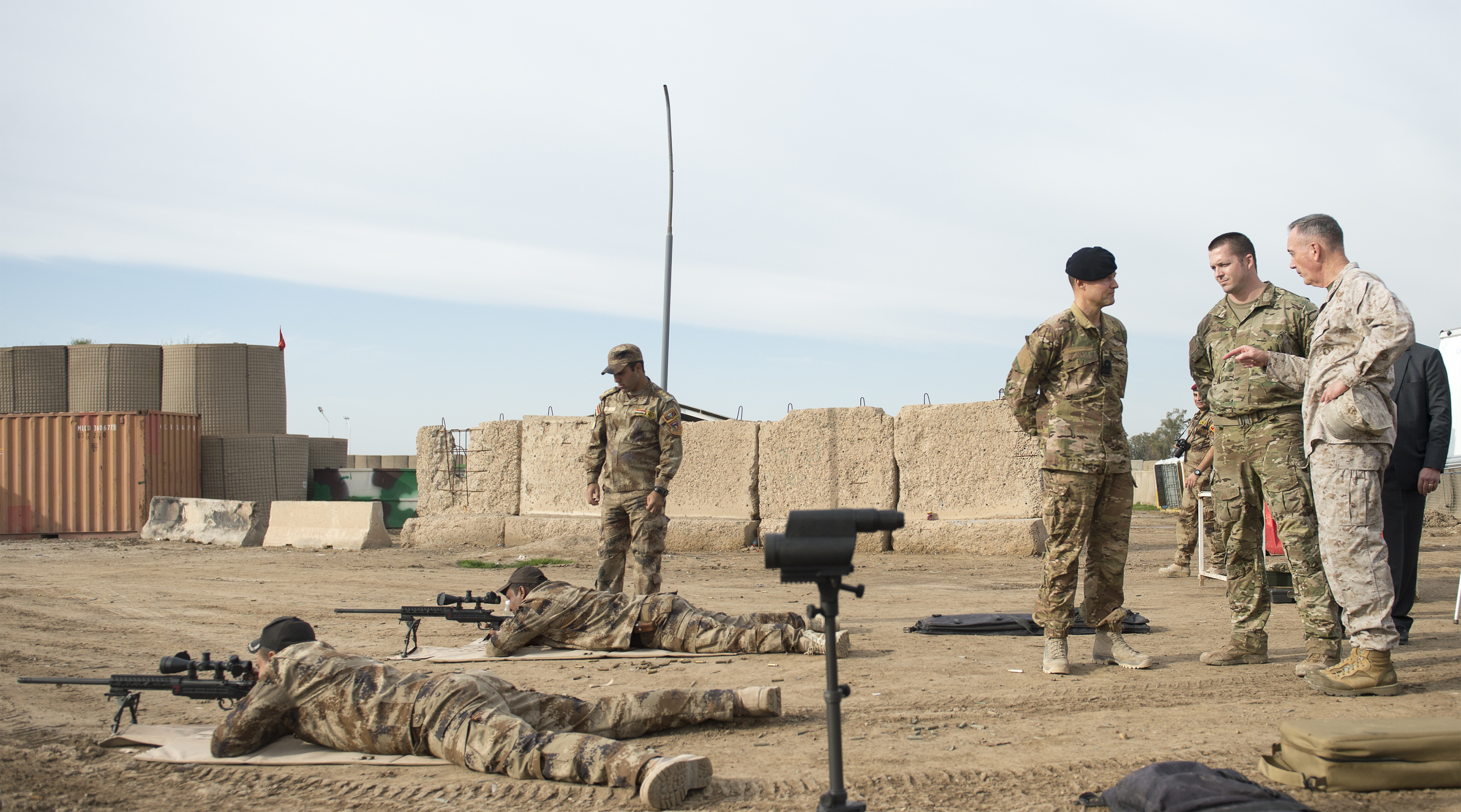
U.S. Marine Gen. Joseph F. Dunford Jr., chairman of the Joint Chiefs of Staff, observes members of the Iraqi Special Operation Forces conduct sniper rifle training at Area VI training site in Baghdad, Jan. 7, 2016. The Iraqi special forces primarily conduct anti-guerrilla operations in Iraq as part of the Iraq War and are part of the Iraqi Counter Terrorism Bureau.

Operation Gallant Phoenix (OGP) is an intelligence fusion centre established in 2013 near Amman, Jordan. It comprises a large number of countries and includes a variety of agencies, including law enforcement, military and civilian personnel, about a total of 250 personnel monitoring. It enhances the ability of member nations' to understand and respond to current, evolving and future violent extremist threats - regardless of threat ideology. Gallant Phoenix allows allied nations not only to share intelligence on the foreign fighter threat, but also to get that information back to their law enforcement and homeland security agencies so they have visibility on the movement of foreign fighters in order to deal with this challenge.

Led by a US Joint Special Operations Command center intelligence are collected on fighters who fought for the likes of the so-called "Islamic State" (IS) and other Islamist militia groups. Relevant information includes documents, data, DNA traces and fingerprints that have been retrieved from former IS strongholds. Alongside the Interpol-led projects ‘Vennlig’ and ‘Hamah’, which cover, amongst other things, the exchange of biometric data from Iraq and Afghanistan, the US military and US Secret Service are running Operation Gallant Phoenix in Syria and Iraq.

According to Europol, at least 5,000 European citizens have traveled to Iraq and Syria since 2014. European strategy shifted as returning fighters have become a major source of concern for European governments. Various nations came up with guidelines contemplating prison for returning fighters to minimize the risk that they pose. But the only charge that could be brought against them was associating with a terrorist group. The new strategy proposes incorporating evidence obtained in conflict zones in order to charge these individuals with specific terrorist crimes committed abroad.

== Contributors ==
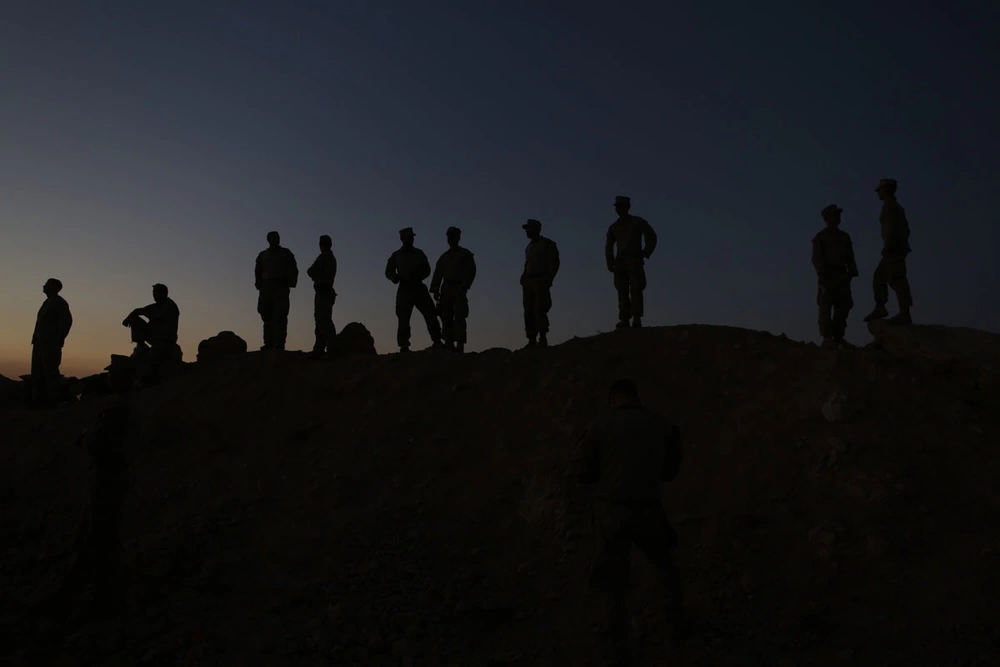
Elements of 5th Marine Expeditionary Brigade Marines and Jordanian Armed Forces on exercise in Zarqa, Jordan, September 2014

Participation in this operation is through secret services, military forces, and police forces. The main contributors to the sharing effort are the Iraqi Army, Kurdish forces (Peshmerga and YPG), NATO allies and the members of the international military coalition against the Islamic State group. The force includes officers from Bahrein, Egypt, Jordan, Saudi Arabia and the United Arab Emirates working alongside Australia, Belgium, Denmark, France, Germany, Israel, Italy, Netherlands, New Zealand, Portugal, Singapore, Spain, Sweden, the United Kingdom, the United States and others Europol also dispatched analysts to Gallant Phoenix since 16 August 2017.

The operation started out with eight or so countries, and has since expanded to 19 nations (2017) who have committed to sharing this intelligence. As of 2018 twenty-one countries are reportedly part of the operation. As of 2021 some 30 countries have been sharing intelligence about jihadist terror organizations at a secret site with the aim of facilitating prosecutions, French newspaper Le Monde reports online.

Australia being a participator in OGP had an Australian special forces soldier removed after multiple allegations of sexual harassment from other members in the program. Captured on CCTV, he allegedly "shoved" his mobile phone up another member's skirt. An Australian Defence Force (ADF) spokesperson confirmed the removal following allegations of misconduct. Another Special Forces soldier was flown to Germany for emergency surgery after allegedly being stabbed during an unauthorised visit to a brothel in northern Iraq. The incidents have strained the working relationship between Australia and other OGP members.

According to a report in German weekly Der Spiegel Germany's intelligence agency, the Bundesnachrichtendienst (BND), has been taking part in the secretive US-led anti-terror operation since October 2017.

New Zealand has had a deployment since 2014. In April 2023, Cabinet extended the mandate for New Zealand's multiagency deployment for a further two years and increased the number of personnel deployed to the operation. The mandate for this deployment expires on 30 June 2025.

The Singapore Armed Forces (SAF) has since 2017 deployed medical teams to Iraq to provide medical support to coalition forces contributing to counter ISIS efforts in Iraq.

Two military personnel of the Portuguese Armed Forces (Portuguese: Forças Armadas) are taking part in the operation (2022).

Belgian defence sources have confirmed Belgian participation since 2016. Members of the Belgian General Intelligence and Security Service (GISS)/(ADIV) carry out secret operations abroad using members of the armed forces schooled in intelligence. Belgian military units train Kurdish forces (Peshmerga and YPG) and members of the Iraqi regular army. The Belgian military intelligence agency ADIV under Eddy Testelmans trained at least in two occasions the YPG in northern Irak in exchange of information about Belgian fighters. The ADIV also liaises between OGP and the Belgian authorities.

The Netherlands trains Kurdish militia and is an active contributor to OGP. The Netherlands Armed Forces, Royal Marechaussee and National Police Force have their part in OGP by delivering data analysts and personnel specialized in investigating and persecution.

In a statement of Trine Bramsen the Ministry of Defence acknowledged the participation of Denmark since 2018.

In Spain information-gathering efforts made by officers on the ground in Syria are relayed to CITCO, the Intelligence Center for Counter-Terrorism and Organized Crime. This agency answers to the Interior Ministry and receives assistance from the National Police, Civil Guard, regional law enforcement agencies and the national intelligence center CNI.

Swedish Armed Forces have been part of OGP since mid-2016. Staff officers are stationed in Jordan. Sweden cooperates within this framework with other nations that are affiliated with the coalition against Daesh, in which Sweden participates since 2015.

In France, participant since 2017, the first trial in which Gallant Phoenix intel was submitted took place last month before the Paris special assize court. Called the "Ulysses affair", the complex dossier was centered around two separate attack plans that were foiled in November 2016, following a cyber infiltration operation in which the French counterterrorism DGSI agency, together with the Interministerial Technical Assistance Service (SIAT), managed to make their way into the ISIS headquarters in Raqqa, Syria. "It's simple, if we manage to bring evidence that someone stayed in this zone, the average sentence in France is 12-13 years. If we can prove there was a commitment to join in combat, the sentence can reach more than 20 years," says an expert.
