= Australian Rugby Championship =

- Founded: 2007
- Abolished: 2007
- Region: Australia
- Teams: 8
- Related competitions: Dewar Shield; John I Dent Cup; Premier Rugby; RugbyWA; Shute Shield
- Last champions: Central Coast Rays (2007)
- Broadcaster: ABC

The Australian Rugby Championship, often abbreviated to the ARC and also known as the Mazda Australian Rugby Championship for sponsorship purposes, was a domestic professional men's rugby union football competition in Australia, which ran for only one season in 2007. It was the predecessor to the also now-defunct National Rugby Championship. The competition, similar to New Zealand's ITM Cup and South Africa's Currie Cup, aimed to bridge the gap between existing club rugby and the international Super Rugby competition then known as Super 14. The ARC involved eight teams: three from New South Wales, two from Queensland, and one each from the Australian Capital Territory, Victoria and Western Australia.

From its inception the ARC divided many in Australian rugby, with arguments over the structure and format of the competition, and concerns that the creation of arbitrary state-based teams would undermine the strong club competitions in Sydney and Brisbane. On 18 December 2007, the Australian Rugby Union (ARU) announced that the ARC would be shut down due to heavy financial losses: the ARC lost A$4.7 million during the 2007 season, with projected losses of $3.3 million for 2008.

On 10 December 2013, Bill Pulver, the CEO of the Australian Rugby Union, announced a new competition along similar lines, the National Rugby Championship, to include 8 to 10 teams in "major population centres".

== History ==
The official announcement on the agreement to create a national rugby competition in Australia was made in mid-2006, following a 70-person three-day summit in Sydney that agreed to an eight team competition. However, the competition was not without its share of controversy, with some of the strong state-level clubs being against the formation of a new level of competition, claiming it could harm club and grassroots rugby. In September, an ARU board meeting, after hearing these concerns, officially approved the new competition.

A month later, the competition kicked off, however the Queensland teams performed poorly as the East Coast Aces and Ballymore Tornadoes finished last and second last respectively.

The Perth Spirit performed the best out of the regular rounds winning six out of eight games, but due to bonus points finished third on the ladder behind the Central Coast Rays and minor premiers the Western Sydney Rams.

After the top four teams took part in the semi-finals, the Melbourne Rebels and Central Coast Rays would compete in the first and last ARC Grand Final: the Rays defeated the Rebels 20–12 to win the premiership.

After a review of the ARC was undertaken following the 2007 season, it was found that it had run $1.3 million over budget and had lost $4.7 million for the 2007 season, with forecast losses for a 2008 season coming to a further $3.3 million. The ARU, concluding that a cumulative loss of $8 million over two years would be fiscal irresponsibility and that it was likely there would be further heavy future losses beyond 2008, immediately decided to shut down the competition.

=== Final ===
Details for the only season held:

Year	Final					Losing semi-finalists	
Year	Winner	Score	Runner-up	Venue	City	1st	2nd
2007	Central Coast Rays	20–12	Melbourne Rebels	Bluetongue Stadium	Gosford, NSW	Perth Spirit	Western Sydney Rams

== Format ==
=== Competition ===
The competition ran for eight weeks, with finals being competed over an additional two weeks - each side played eight games, with the top four teams qualifying for the semi-finals where the winners move into the final. The competition kicked off in August, after the Super 14 and the March to July club competitions finished, and avoiding a clash with Australian under-19 and under-21 duties and the Pacific Nations Cup (in which Australia A played). In total, 35 matches were played in the ARC over 10 weeks from 11 August and 14 October, with games played on Fridays and Sundays. It was originally planned that games would not be played at 'traditional' times for rugby matches, but this decision was changed when the ABC insisted that its televised games be played on Saturday and Sunday afternoons. The inaugural final was played between the Central Coast Rays and the Melbourne Rebels in Gosford.

=== Players ===
The timeframe of the season ensured the availability of Super 14 players (excluding Wallabies). There was no draft, and players were free to choose their team, although there was a salary cap in place. Players came from local competitions (which includes Super 14 players). Each Super 14 franchise was aligned with the respective teams, except for Melbourne, as Victoria had no Super rugby team at the time.

It was planned that although 35 footballers will be on international duty for the Wallabies, over 90 Super 14 players would go into the ARC, leaving the way for over 120 footballers to step up from first grade club competitions.

It was also planned that each team would have one "marquee" footballer not be subject to financial restrictions of the player contracting protocol. The player could be either foreign or a non-contracted domestic footballer, and if a team signed an Australian as their marquee footballer, they would still be able to sign up a foreign footballer, though they would have to fit within the contract restrictions.

=== Rules ===
The ARU announced in June 2007 that the inaugural championship would adopt the Experimental Law Variations (ELVs), which were initially trialled at South Africa's Stellenbosch University and which aim to bring more free-flowing play into the game. The laws were implemented in both the Sydney and Brisbane club competitions and were well received.

=== Referees ===
The referees supplied for the tournament predominantly come from the Australian Rugby Union Panels.

Referees for the tournament included: Matt Goddard, James Leckie, James Scholtens, George Ayoub, Daniel Cheever, Brett Bowden, Andrew Lindsay and Geoff Acton.

Stuart Dickinson and Paul Marks did not referee in the tournament, as they refereed at the 2007 Rugby World Cup in France.

== Media coverage ==
The Championship was broadcast on free-to-air television during its only season. The Australian Broadcasting Corporation (ABC) secured the rights to exclusively televise the competition from 2007 through to 2009 by agreeing to accept a substantial fee from the ARU in order to cover the matches.

The fact that the sport's governing organisation had to pay a television station to broadcast the Championship arguably left worrying implications for a code that was struggling to attract mainstream interest in Australia. The ABC committed to broadcast 19 matches during the season on ABC1 and ABC2: two matches from each round, the semi-finals and the final.

The previous time the ABC had covered elite-level rugby was for the 1991 Rugby World Cup (which Australia won).

== Regular season 2007 ==
The eight teams played four home games and four away games each during the preliminary competition rounds, consisting of a single round-robin with each team playing each other once plus an additional return match for the "derby" fixture played in the first round (these fixtures were matches between the closest neighbouring teams in most cases). The top four teams at the end of the preliminary competition rounds qualified for the title play-offs with semi-finals and finals.

=== Standings ===
2007 Australian Rugby Championship
Pos	Team	P	W	D	L	PF	PA	PD	TB	LB	Pts
1	Western Sydney Rams	8	5	0	3	239	149	+90	5	2	27
2	Central Coast Rays	8	5	0	3	268	159	+109	5	1	26
3	Perth Spirit	8	6	0	2	210	138	+72	1	0	25
4	Melbourne Rebels	8	5	0	3	170	206	−36	4	0	24
5	Sydney Fleet	8	4	0	4	212	244	−32	3	1	20
6	Canberra Vikings	8	3	0	5	217	191	+26	4	3	19
7	Ballymore Tornadoes	8	2	0	6	180	229	−49	1	2	11
8	East Coast Aces	8	2	0	6	163	343	−180	3	0	11
Updated: 30 September 2007 Source: rugbyarchive.net • Teams 1 to 4 (Green background) at the end of the preliminary competition rounds qualify for the Title play-offs.
Four points for a win, two for a draw. One bonus point for four tries or more (TB) and one bonus point for losing by seven or fewer (LB). If teams are level on points in the standings at any stage, tiebreakers are applied in the following order: • Difference between points for and against • Total number of points for • Number of matches won • Aggregate number of points scored in matches between tied teams

=== Competition rounds ===
==== Round 1 ====
10 August 2007	Sydney Fleet	25–19	Central Coast Rays	North Sydney Oval
19:00 AEST		Report		Attendance: 3,547; Referee: Matt Goddard

10 August 2007	Perth Spirit	21–13	Western Sydney Rams	Members Equity Stadium
19:00 AWST		Report		Attendance: 3,643; Referee: James Leckie

11 August 2007	Canberra Vikings	27–32	Melbourne Rebels	Manuka Oval
14.30 AEST		Report		Attendance: 4,355; Referee: Brett Bowden

12 August 2007	East Coast Aces	27–21	Ballymore Tornadoes	Gold Coast Stadium
16:00 AEST		Report		Attendance: 2,490; Referee: Geoff Acton

==== Round 2 ====
17 August 2007	Perth Spirit	8–17	Canberra Vikings	Members Equity Stadium
19.00 AWST		Report		Attendance: 5,111; Referee: Andrew Lindsay

18 August 2007	Central Coast Rays	30–39	Western Sydney Rams	Bluetongue Central Coast Stadium
15.00 AEST		Report		Attendance: 3,201; Referee: Daniel Cheever

18 August 2007	Melbourne Rebels	34–24	East Coast Aces	Olympic Park Stadium
19.30 AEST		Report		Attendance: 4,875; Referee: James Scholtens

19 August 2007	Ballymore Tornadoes	26–20	Sydney Fleet	Ballymore Stadium
16.00 AEST		Report		Attendance: 3,389; Referee: Ian Smith

==== Round 3 ====
25 August 2007	Sydney Fleet	35–25	Perth Spirit	North Sydney Oval
15:10 AEST		Report		Attendance: 2,306; Referee: Daniel Cheever

26 August 2007	Canberra Vikings	53–8	Ballymore Tornadoes	Manuka Oval
14:30 AEST		Report		Attendance: 3,682; Referee: Julian Pritchard

26 August 2007	East Coast Aces	15–44	Central Coast Rays	Gold Coast Stadium
16:00 AEST		Report		Attendance: 1,010; Referee: Simon Moore

26 August 2007	Western Sydney Rams	31–10	Melbourne Rebels	Parramatta Stadium
16:00 AEST		Report		Attendance: 2,016; Referee: Nathan Pearce

==== Round 4 ====
31 August 2007	Melbourne Rebels	39–20	Sydney Fleet	Olympic Park Stadium
19:30 AEST		Report		Attendance: 3,286; Referee: James Leckie

1 September 2007	Western Sydney Rams	25–7	Ballymore Tornadoes	Parramatta Stadium
15:00 AEST		Report		Attendance: 1,601; Referee: Ian Smith

2 September 2007	Central Coast Rays	19–31	Perth Spirit	Bluetongue Central Coast Stadium
16:00 AEST		Report		Attendance: 2,013; Referee: Matt Goddard

2 September 2007	East Coast Aces	35–34	Canberra Vikings	Gold Coast Stadium
16:00 AEST		Report		Attendance: 784; Referee: Simon Moore

==== Round 5 ====
7 September 2007	Central Coast Rays	29–10	Ballymore Tornadoes	Bluetongue Central Coast Stadium
19.30 AEST		Report		Attendance: 2,421; Referee: Daniel Cheever

8 September 2007	Perth Spirit	24–3	Melbourne Rebels	Members Equity Stadium
13.00 AWST		Report		Attendance: 3,712; Referee: Matt Goddard

9 September 2007	Canberra Vikings	56–29	Sydney Fleet	Canberra Stadium
14.30 AWST		Report		Attendance: 2,017; Referee: Julian Pritchard

9 September 2007	East Coast Aces	20–44	Western Sydney Rams	Gold Coast Stadium
16.00 AEST		Report		Referee: Brett Bowden

==== Round 6 ====
15 September 2007	Perth Spirit	60–15	East Coast Aces	Members Equity Stadium
13.00 AWST		Report		Attendance: 3,117; Referee: Julian Pritchard

15 September 2007	Sydney Fleet	24–17	Western Sydney Rams	North Sydney Oval
15.00 AEST		Report		Attendance: 3,241; Referee: Nathan Pearce

16 September 2007	Canberra Vikings	13–17	Central Coast Rays	Manuka Oval
14.30 AEST		Report		Attendance: 3,714; Referee: Brett Bowden

16 September 2007	Ballymore Tornadoes	25–34	Melbourne Rebels	Ballymore Stadium
16.00 AEST		Report		Attendance: 1,478; Referee: James Scholtens

==== Round 7 ====
22 September 2007	Melbourne Rebels	7–55	Central Coast Rays	Olympic Park Stadium
15.00 AEST		Report		Referee: Julian Pritchard

22 September 2007	Western Sydney Rams	51–17	Canberra Vikings	Parramatta Stadium
19.30 AEST		Report		Attendance: 2,139; Referee: James Leckie

23 September 2007	Ballymore Tornadoes	17–21	Perth Spirit	Ballymore Stadium
16.00 AEST		Report		Referee: Brett Bowden

23 September 2007	Sydney Fleet	40–7	East Coast Aces	North Sydney Oval
16.00 AEST		Report		Attendance: 1,536; Referee: James Scholtens

==== Round 8 ====
29 September 2007	Ballymore Tornadoes	66–20	East Coast Aces	Ballymore Stadium
15.00 AEST		Report		Referee: Simon Moore

29 September 2007	Western Sydney Rams	19–20	Perth Spirit	Parramatta Stadium
19.30 AEST		Report		Attendance: 1,612; Referee: Matt Goddard

30 September 2007	Central Coast Rays	55–19	Sydney Fleet	Bluetongue Central Coast Stadium
16.00 AEST		Report		Attendance: 1,658; Referee: Nathan Pearce

30 September 2007	Melbourne Rebels	11–0	Canberra Vikings	Olympic Park Stadium
16.00 AEST		Report		Attendance: 1,753; Referee: James Leckie

== Title play-offs 2007 ==
The top four sides in the regular season advanced to the knock-out stage of semi-finals and final to decide the Australian Rugby Championship title.

=== Semi-finals ===
6 October 2007	Central Coast Rays	27–19	Perth Spirit	Bluetongue Central Coast Stadium
15:10 AEST	Try: Peter Hewat 41' c Ben Jacobs 60' c Sam Norton-Knight 72' c Con: Peter Hewat (3/3) 42', 61', 73'; Pen: Peter Hewat (2/2) 68', 80'	Report 1 Report 2	Try: Sitaleki Timani 24' c Con: Luke McLean (1/1) 25'; Pen: Scott Daruda (1/1) 7'; Luke McLean (3/4) 20', 26', 50'	Attendance: 1,818; Referee: James Leckie

7 October 2007	Western Sydney Rams	3–23	Melbourne Rebels	Parramatta Stadium
16:10 AEST	Pen: Ben Martin (1/1) 38'	Report 1 Report 2	Try: Richard Stanford 11' c James Lew 20' m Digby Ioane 47' m Con: Jack Farrer (1/3) 12'; Pen: Jack Farrer (2/2) 24', 57'	Attendance: 1,512; Referee: Nathan Pearce

=== Grand Final ===
13 October 2007	Central Coast Rays	20–12	Melbourne Rebels	Bluetongue Central Coast Stadium
15:00 AEST	Try: Beau Robinson 21' c Peter Hewat 38' c Con: Peter Hewat (2/2) 22', 39'; Pen: Peter Hewat (2/3) 29', 68'; Cards: Andrew Smith (yellow card) 62' to 72'	Report; Summary	Try: James Hanson 9' c David Croft 64' m Con: Jack Farrer (1/2) 10'	Attendance: 1,189; Referee: Matt Goddard

== Players 2007 ==
=== Leading try scorers ===
Top 10 try scorers
Pos	Name	Tries	Team
1	Sam Norton-Knight	8	Central Coast Rays
2	Eddie McLaughlin	7	Canberra Vikings
3	Francis Fainifo	6	Canberra Vikings
4	Kurtley Beale	5	Western Sydney Rams
4	Peter Hewat	5	Central Coast Rays
4	Peter Playford	5	Melbourne Rebels
4	Beau Robinson	5	Central Coast Rays
4	Morgan Turinui	5	Sydney Fleet
4	Lachlan Turner	5	Western Sydney Rams
10	Ben Alexander	4	Western Sydney Rams
10	Daniel Halangahu	4	Sydney Fleet
10	Ben Jacobs	4	Central Coast Rays
10	Ed Jenkins	4	Perth Spirit
10	Alfi Mafi	4	Sydney Fleet

Source: rugby.com.au

=== Leading point scorers ===
Top 10 overall point scorers
Pos	Name	Points	Team
1	Peter Hewat	121	Central Coast Rays
2	Ben Martin	94	Western Sydney Rams
3	Clint Schifcofske	82	Ballymore Tornadoes
4	Cam Shepherd	69	Perth Spirit
5	Matthew Carraro	61	Canberra Vikings
6	Daniel Halangahu	57	Sydney Fleet
7	Andrew Walker	51	East Coast Aces
8	Sam Norton-Knight	40	Central Coast Rays
8	Gavin DeBartolo	40	Sydney Fleet
10	Scott Daruda	38	Perth Spirit

Source: rugby.com.au

=== Squad lists ===
Team squad lists for the 2007 ARC:

2007 Ballymore Tornadoes squad – ARC
Props: Ben Coutts THP (Souths)*; Greg Holmes LHP (Sunnybank)*; Peter Loane THP (Norths); Brett Naylor THP (GPS); Shon Siemonek LHP (Sunshine Coast); Ernest Skelton LHP (Wests)*; Hookers: Geoff Abram HK (Wests)*; Sean Hardman HK (Brothers); Joshua Mann-Rea HK (Easts); Locks: Jared Hanna LK (Wests); James Horwill LK (University)*; Tristan Hill LK (Norths); Daniel Linde LK (University)**; Ed O'Donoghue LK (Wests)*	Loose forwards: Leroy Houston BR (Sydney)*; Steve Miller BR (GPS); Tom McVerry BR (GPS) Captain*; Ray Stowers BR (Norths); Scott Higginbotham N8 (Wests)**; Charles Wyllie N8 (Sunshine Coast); Scrum-halves: Sam Cordingley SH (Brothers)*; Will Genia SH (GPS)*; Brendan McKibbin SH (Brothers)**; Fly-halves: David Collis FH (Sydney); Berrick Barnes FH (Wests)*; Peter Hynes FH WG (University)*	Centres: Blair Connor CE WG (Norths)**; Brett Gillespie CE (University)**; Byron Roberts OB (GPS); Tim Sampson CE (Sunnybank); Donovan Slade CE (GPS); Wings: Paul Doneley OB (Brothers); Elia Tuqiri WG FH (GPS); Anthony Sauer OB (Brothers); Fullbacks: Clinton Schifcofske FB (Wests)*; * Contracted Queensland Reds player ** Reds Academy player

2007 Canberra Vikings – ARC
Props: Nic Henderson; Jack Kennedy; Pauliasi Tomoepeau; John Ulugia; Hookers: Saia Fainga'a; Anthony Hegarty; Dan Raymond; Locks: Alister Campbell; Peter Kimlin; Leon Power; Adam Wallace-Harrison	Back row: Jarred Barry; Mark Chisholm; Dan Guinness; Julian Salvi; Jone Tawake; Henry Vanderglas; Halfbacks: Beau Mokotupu; Nick Haydon; Patrick Phibbs; Flyhalves: Christian Lealiifano	Centres: Tim Cornforth; Matthew Carraro; Anthony Fainga'a; Gene Fairbanks; Rowan Kellam; Wings: Francis Fainifo; Solomona Fainifo; Eddie Mclaughlin; Fullbacks: Tim Wright

2007 Central Coast Rays squad – ARC
Props: Al Baxter†; Ofa Fainga’anuku; Nick Lah; Rod Moore‡; Aaron Tawera; Hookers: Alex Gluth; Al Manning; Dustin McGregor; Locks: John Adams; Nifo Nifo; Chris Thompson; Cameron Treloar	Loose forwards: Ross Duncan; Steve Evans; Jared Waerea-Hargreaves; Jason Peseta; Wycliff Palu†; Vili Ratu; Beau Robinson; Dylan Sigg; Scrum-halves: Brett Sheehan; Fly-halves: Clint Eadie; David Harvey; Sam Norton-Knight	Centres: Sam Harris; Ben Jacobs; Wings: Jordan Macey; Pat McCabe; Jye Mullane; Andrew Smith; Fullbacks: Peter Hewat; † Player not in initial squad ‡ Did not play

2007 East Coast Aces squad – ARC
Props: Lloyd Campbell-McBride (Easts); Tama Tuirirangi (Gold Coast); Ben Coutts (Souths); Joe Tufuga (Sunnybank); Hookers: Jade Ingham (Easts); Ole Avei (Sunnybank); Locks: Will Munsie (Gold Coast); Luke Caughley (Gold Coast); Rob Simmons (Sunnybank)	Back row: Ben Mowen (Easts); Daniel Ese (Gold Coast); A.J. Gilbert (Souths); Josh Afu (Sunnybank); Halfbacks: Nic Berry (Sunnybank); Sam Batty (Gold Coast); Flyhalves: Ben Lucas (Sunnybank); Quade Cooper (Souths)	Centres: Lloyd Johansson (Gold Coast) Captain; Waitai Walker (Sunnybank); Charlie Fetoai (Souths); Henari Veratau (Sunnybank); Wings: Caleb Brown (Gold Coast); Brett Stapleton (Gold Coast); Fullbacks: Chris Latham (Gold Coast); Andrew Walker (Easts); Marshall Milroy (Gold Coast); John Dart (Sunnybank)

2007 Melbourne Rebels squad – ARC
Props: Scott Cameron PR (Sydney Uni); Heamani Lavaka PR (Easts, Sydney); Dan Palmer THP (Southern Districts); Mike Ross PR (Easts, Sydney); Hookers: Nick Churven HK (GPS); James Hanson HK (UQ); Nick Hensley HK (Sydney Uni); Locks: Matt Cockbain FL, LK (GPS); Liam Shaw LK (Brothers); Richard Stanford LK (Brumbies)	Loose forwards: David Croft FL (Reds, Brothers) Captain; David Dennis FL (Waratahs); Dave Haigh FL (Sydney Uni); David Haydon FL (Sydney Uni); Matt Hodgson FL (Force ); Shawn Mackay FL (Randwick); Filipe Manu N8 (Souths, Brisbane); Scrum-halves: Luke Burgess SH (Waratahs); Jon McGrath SH (Force ); Fly-halves: Michael Hobbs FH (UQ); Dan Kelly FH (Sydney Uni)	Centres: Luke Cross CE (GPS); Jack Farrer CE (Sydney Uni); James Lew CE (Norths, Sydney); Wings: Digby Ioane WG, CE (Reds); Peter Playford WG, CE (Brumbies); Peter Owens WG (Sydney Uni); Nathan Trist WG (Sydney Uni); Fullbacks: Damon Murphy WG, FB (Brothers)

2007 Perth Spirit squad – ARC
Props: Pekahou Cowan PR; Gareth Hardy PR; Kieran Longbottom THP; Troy Takiari PR; AJ Whalley PR; Hookers: Luke Holmes HK; Tai McIsaac HK; Ryan Tyrrell HK; Locks: Tom Hockings LK; Sitaleki Timani LK; Rudi Vedelago LK; Luke Doherty LK BR; Scott Fardy LK BR	Back row: Scott Fava BR; Will Bloem FL; Richard Brown N8; David Pocock OF; Halfbacks: Matt Henjak SH Captain; James Stannard SH; Flyhalves: Scott Daruda FH; Todd Feather FH; Jimmy Hilgendorf FH; Lachlan MacKay FH CE	Centres: Ryan Cross CE; Junior Pelesasa CE; Kane Allen OB; Wings: Ed Jenkins WG; Jackson Mullane WG; Dan Bailey OB; Nick Cummins OB; Haig Sare OB; Ratu Siganiyavi WG; Fullbacks: Cameron Shepherd FB WG; Luke McLean FB

2007 Sydney Fleet squad – ARC
Props: Sean Baker (Randwick); Dayna Edwards (Randwick); Jeremy Tilse (Sydney Uni); Laurie Weeks (Sydney Uni); Hookers: Atonio Halangahu (Randwick); Daniel Lewinski (Sydney Uni); Todd Pearce (Eastwood); Sam Zlatevski (Easts); Locks: Adam Byrnes (Easts); Ed Brenac (Easts); Will Caldwell (Sydney Uni); Lachlan McCutcheon (Sydney Uni); Matthew Whittleston (Randwick)	Back row: Tim Davidson (Sydney Uni); Chris Houston (Randwick); Pat McCutcheon (Sydney Uni); Dean Mumm (Sydney Uni); Halfbacks: James Price (Randwick); Nathan Sievert (Sydney Uni); Josh Valentine (Manly); Flyhalves: Daniel Halangahu (Sydney Uni); Danny Kroll (Randwick)	Centres: Morgan Turinui (Randwick); Tom Azar (Easts); Tom Carter (Sydney Uni); Wings: Sanualio Afeaki (Sydney Uni); Andrew Barrett (Souths); Anton La Vin (Easts); Junior Puroku (Easts); Filipo Toala (Eastwood); Fullbacks: Gavin Debartolo (Easts); Arthur Little (Randwick)

2007 Western Sydney Rams squad – ARC
Props: Ben Alexander LHP (Eastwood); Aaron Broughton-Rouse THP (Eastwood); James Lakepa PR (Manly); Peter Niumata PR (Penrith); Benn Robinson LHP (Eastwood); Hookers: Josh Mann-Rea HK (Manly); Tatafu Polota-Nau HK (Parramatta) V-Capt.; Ben Roberts HK (West Harbour); Locks: Ben Hand (c) LK (Eastwood); Van Humphries LK (No Club); Marty Wilson LK (Eastwood); Sam Wykes LK (Parramatta)	Loose forwards: Wil Brame FL (Manly); Ben Coridas FL (Eastwood); Mark Howell FL (West Harbour); Gareth Palamo FL Eastwood); Hugh Perrett FL (Eastwood); Tom Egan N8 FL (Easts); Scrum-halves: Josh Holmes SH (Eastwood); Dave Rimmer SH (West Harbour); Fly-halves: Kurtley Beale FH (Norths); Josh Weeks FH CE (Parramatta); Fa'atonu Fili FH FB (No Club)	Centres: Rory Sidey CE (West Harbour); Luke Johnson CE WG (Manly); Chris Siale CE WG (Manly); Wings: Filipo Toala WG (Eastwood); Lachlan Mitchell WG CE (Sydney Uni); Fullbacks: Ben Martin UB (Eastwood); Lachie Turner FB WG (Eastwood) Capt.

== See also ==
- National Rugby Championship
- Australian Provincial Championship (defunct)
- Australian Rugby Shield (defunct)
