= Perth Spirit =

Defunct Australian rugby union club, based in Perth, WA

- Union: Rugby Australia
- Founded: 2007
- Disbanded: 2018 (pre-season)
- Location: Perth, Western Australia
- Ground: UWA Rugby Park
- League(s): NRC, ARC
- 2016: Champions
1st kit	2nd kit

The Perth Spirit is a former rugby union team based in Perth, Western Australia, that played in the National Rugby Championship (NRC) from 2014 to 2017, winning the competition in 2016. The team was formed in 2007 to compete in the Australian Rugby Championship (ARC).

The Perth Spirit team was organised and managed by RugbyWA. The high performance programs utilised by the Western Force in Super Rugby were extended to players joining the Spirit from the Force, the Perth Premier Grade competition and the Future Force rugby academy.

The identity of the Perth Spirit remained the same throughout team's participation in the ARC and NRC. The team disbanded when the ARC was discontinued after the first season in 2007 but, after an absence of six years, the national competition was relaunched in 2014 as the NRC, and the Perth Spirit was revived. In 2017, however, the Western Force was excluded from the Super Rugby competition. The reformed RugbyWA then decided to enter the Western Force in the National Rugby Championship, replacing the Perth Spirit for the start of the 2018 season.

== History ==
In 2006, after setting up a consultative process culminating in a working session of some 70 delegates from around the country, the Australian Rugby Union announced that a new, eight-team national competition would commence in 2007 to compete for the Australian Rugby Championship (ARC).

=== Australian Rugby Championship ===
With the announcement of a new national rugby union competition, it was known that one of the foundation clubs would be located in Perth - with three teams in New South Wales, two in Queensland and one each in Canberra and Melbourne making up the inaugural eight.

The Perth team's name - Spirit, along with colours and logo were unveiled in March 2007. Some 20 names were considered for the ARC team, with Spirit being the option finally preferred because it was seen to be identifiable as Western Australian and a good fit with the Force name used by the Super Rugby team. RugbyWA Chief Executive, Peter O’Meara, said:

Just as Force taps into the natural elements that have shaped WA, the word Spirit is strong, powerful and dynamic, and reflects the independent, open-minded and entrepreneurial way West Aussies approach things.

— Peter O’Meara, Perth Spirit launch, 21 March 2007.

At the launch of the new team, it was revealed that John Mulvihill would be the head coach of the Spirit for the inaugural season. Mulvihill was also the Super 14 Western Force attack coach. The team's jersey for the ARC was a traditional design with black and gold hoops.

The ARC competition started in August, with the Spirit playing their first home game on the second weekend of August. The Spirit's home games were played at Members Equity Stadium. At the time, the Western Force did not play at Members Equity but at the larger capacity venue of Subiaco Oval. However, Members Equity Stadium was better suited to rugby due to its rectangular configuration. The stadium had a capacity of around 17,000 in 2007. It has since been expanded to hold over 20,000 and, due to another sponsorship deal, is now known as nib Stadium.

The players in the ARC squad adopted an unconventional name of the "Perth Pigs". The team was captained by half back Matt Henjak after he overcame a back injury. Tai McIsaac was the vice-captain. Perth finished third on the league table after the regular season, and played the Central Coast Rays in a semi-final at Gosford. The Rays won the match 20–8.

The Australian Rugby Championship was terminated at the end of 2007 after only one season of competition, with the Australian Rugby Union citing higher costs than budgeted and further projected financial losses. The Perth Spirit team was disbanded with the end of the ARC competition.

=== National Rugby Championship ===
In December 2013, the ARU announced that the national competition was to be relaunched, with the National Rugby Championship (NRC) commencing in 2014. Expressions of interest were open to any interested parties, with the accepted bids finalised in early 2014.

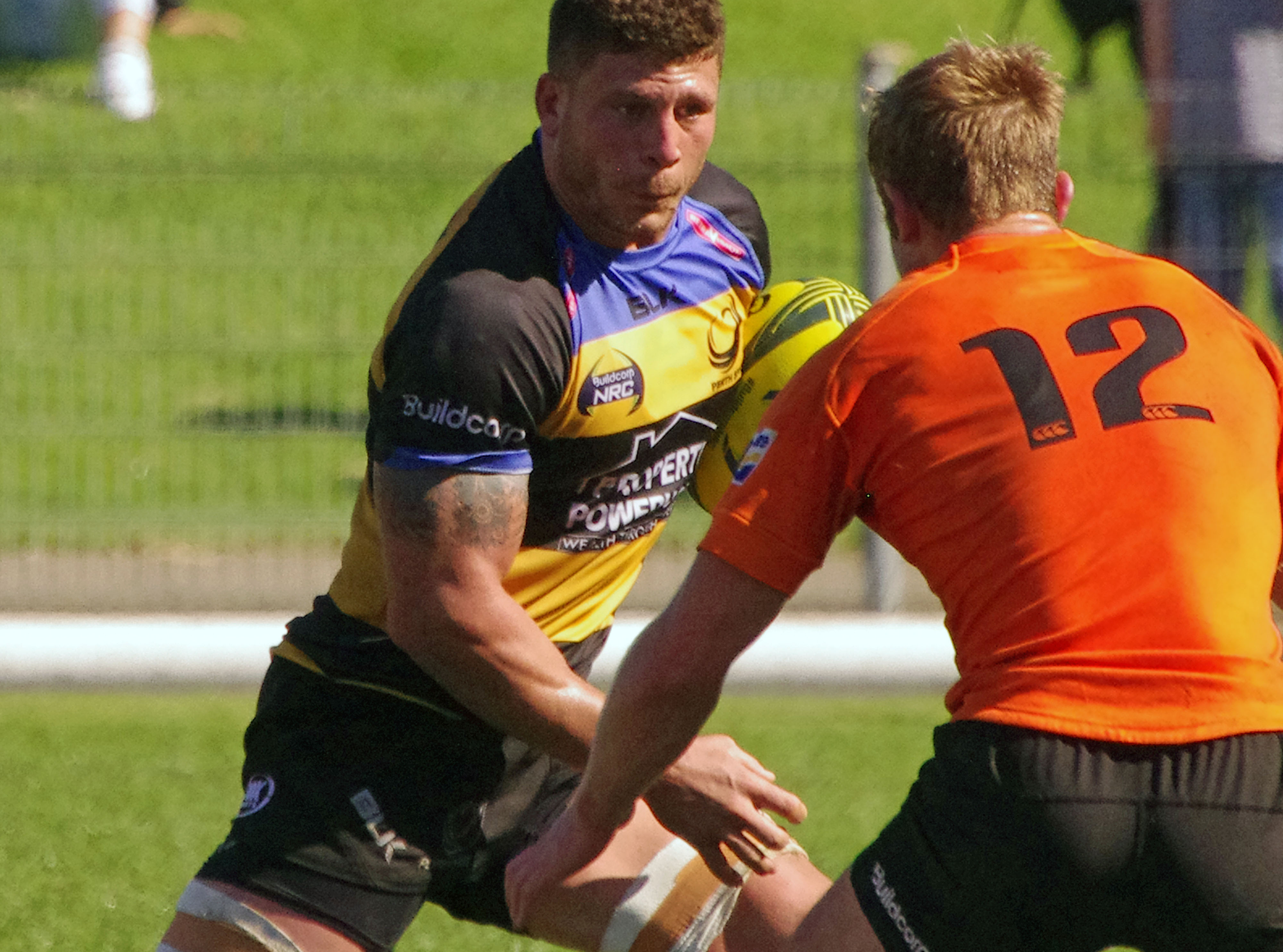
Spirit's Brynard Stander runs the ball against Kyle Godwin of NSW Country in 2016

In 2014, it was announced that the Perth Spirit team would be revived to take part in the National Rugby Championship, and that the original logo and black and gold jersey colours would be retained. For the 2014 NRC season, the Spirit secured Western Australian local business the Property Club as the main jersey sponsor on a three-year deal, and non-bank currency specialist AFEX (Associated Foreign Exchange) as shorts sponsor on a two-year deal.

Western Force assistant coaches David Wessels and Kevin Foote were named as joint head coaches of the Perth Spirit for the 2014 season. Dwayne Nestor and Elwee Prinsloo were named as assistant coaches. For the Spirit's first match, Rory Walton was named as captain from an on-field leadership group which also included Kyle Godwin, Luke Morahan, Ian Prior, Heath Tessmann, and Sam Wykes.

Dwayne Nestor was appointed head coach in 20I6.

2016 NRC Final

Perth Spirit beat the NSW Country Eagles to win the 2016 NRC Final 20–16 at Scully Park.

== Colours and logo ==
The Perth Spirit's main colours were black and gold, the traditional colours of Western Australia. The NRC jerseys also had a splash of blue under the collar to symbolise the pathway to the Western Force team. The team's logo featured a stylised black swan, similar to that of the Western Force although on a gold background instead of the Force's blue. The black swan is the state emblem and state bird of Western Australia.

Perth Spirit's ARC kit and logo in 2007.

Spirit's main and alternate kits 2014–15

== Home grounds ==
Most of the Perth Spirit's home matches were played at the UWA Rugby Club in Mount Claremont. In their earlier seasons matches were also played at other locations across Greater Perth, and a match was also hosted in Adelaide to promote the growth of rugby in South Australia. Venues used in previous seasons include:

City	Venue	Capacity
Joondalup	HBF Arena	16,000
Port Kennedy	Rockingham RUC	2,000
Adelaide, S.A.	Thebarton Oval	15,000

== Records ==
=== Honours ===
- **National Rugby Championship**
  - Champions: 2016
  - Runners-up: 2014
  - Playoff appearances: 2017
- **Horan-Little Shield**
  - Season winners: 2017
- **Australian Rugby Championship**
  - Playoff appearances: 2007

=== Season standings ===
National Rugby Championship

Year	Pos	Pld	W	D	L	F	A	+/-	BP	Pts	Play-offs
2017	**4th**	8	4	0	4	269	237	+32	4	**20**	Semi-final loss to Canberra Vikings by 40–35
2016	**3rd**	7	5	0	2	250	210	+40	2	**22**	Grand final win over NSW Country by 20–16
2015	**6th**	8	3	0	5	276	271	+5	4	**16**	Did not compete
2014	**4th**	8	3	0	5	301	259	+42	5	**17**	Grand final loss to Brisbane City by 37–26

Australian Rugby Championship

Year	Pos	Pld	W	D	L	F	A	+/-	BP	Pts	Play-offs
2007	**3rd**	8	6	0	2	210	138	72	1	**25**	Semi-final loss to Central Coast Rays by 27–19

=== Head coaches ===
- 2017: Kevin Foote
- 2016: Dwayne Nestor
- 2015: Tai McIsaac
- 2014: David Wessels and Kevin Foote
- 2007: John Mulvihill

=== Captains ===
- 2017: Michael Ruru
- 2016: Heath Tessmann
- 2015: Heath Tessmann, Ian Prior, Angus Cottrell
- 2014: Rory Walton, Sam Wykes, Ian Prior
- 2007: Matt Henjak

=== Squads ===
2017 Perth Spirit squad – NRC

The squad for the 2017 National Rugby Championship season:

**Props**: Jermaine Ainsley; **Pekahou Cowan**; Mees Erasmus; **Tetera Faulkner**; Beau King; Baxter King; Shambeckler Vui; **Hookers**: Logan Ede; Sama Malolo; **Tatafu Polota-Nau**^{1}; Anaru Rangi; **Locks**: Richie Arnold; **Adam Coleman**^{1}; Ben Grant; **Matt Philip**	**Loose forwards**: Angus Cottrell; **Richard Hardwick**^{1}; Onehunga Havili; Kane Koteka; **Ben McCalman**; Isi Naisarani; **Scrum-halves**: Michael McDonald; Ian Prior; Michael Ruru (c); **Fly-halves**: **Peter Grant**; Nick Jooste; Jono Lance	**Centres**: **Marcel Brache**; Bill Meakes; Chance Peni; Sheldon Tawara; **Wingers**: Brendan Owen; **Curtis Rona**; James Verity-Amm; **Fullbacks**: **Dane Haylett-Petty**^{1}; Clay Uyen

(c) Denotes team captain, Bold player internationally capped at the time, ^{1} denotes allocated national player additional to the squad.

2016 Perth Spirit squad – NRC

The following players were named in the Perth Spirit's extended squad for the 2016 National Rugby Championship:

**Props**: Jermaine Ainsley; **Pekahou Cowan**; Mees Erasmus; Beau King; Laione Mulikiha'amea; Shambeckler Vui; **Hookers**: Anaru Rangi; Harry Scoble; Heath Tessmann (c); **Locks**: Brad Campbell; **Adam Coleman**; Grayson Knapp; Riley Winter	**Loose forwards**: Richard Hardwick; Ross Haylett-Petty; Kane Koteka; Hadleigh May; Auega Seumanutafa; Brynard Stander; **Scrum-halves**: Ryan Louwrens; Ian Prior; Michael Ruru; **Fly-halves**: AJ Alatimu; Jono Lance	**Centres**: **Marcel Brache**; Louie David; Ammon Matuauto; Bill Meakes; **Ben Tapuai**; Eric Vasukicakau; **Wingers**: Onehunga Havilli; Semisi Masirewa; **Luke Morahan**; James Wepener; **Fullbacks**: Manihera Eden; James Verity-Amm

(c) Denotes team captain, Bold player internationally capped at the time, ^{1} denotes allocated national player additional to the squad.

2015 Perth Spirit squad – NRC

The following players were named in the Perth Spirit's extended squad for the 2015 National Rugby Championship:

**Props**: Jermaine Ainsley; **Tetera Faulkner**^{1}; Chris Heiberg; Ollie Hoskins; Francois van Wyk; **Hookers**: Harry Scoble; Heath Tessmann (c); **Locks**: Ross Haylett-Petty; Rory Walton; Riley Winter	**Loose forwards**: Chris Alcock; Hayden Anderson; Angus Cottrell; Adrian Hall; Richard Hardwick; Kane Koteka; Alex Rovira; Auege Seumanatafa; **Scrum-halves**: Ian Prior; Ryan Louwrens; Michael Ruru; **Fly-halves**: Luke Burton; Nick Jooste	**Centres**: Kyle Godwin^{1}; Maalonga Konelio; Ammon Matuauto; Junior Rasolea; **Wingers**: Brad Lacey; Byron Hutchinson; Sevuloni Mocenacagi; Onehunga Havili; **Fullbacks**: Albert Nikoro; Daley Harper

(c) Denotes team captain, Bold denotes player internationally capped at the time, ^{1} denotes allocated national player additional to the squad.

2014 Perth Spirit squad – NRC

The following players were named in the Perth Spirit's extended squad for the 2014 National Rugby Championship:

**Props**: **Pek Cowan**^{1}; Tetera Faulkner; Chris Heiberg; Alec Hepburn; Ollie Hoskins; Joe Savage; Francois van Wyk; **Hookers**: Robbie Abel; **Nathan Charles**^{1}; Harry Scoble; Heath Tessmann; **Locks**: Brent Murphy; Scott Stevens; Kieran Stringer; Rory Walton (c); Sam Wykes; George Bretag-Norris	**Loose forwards**: Richard Hardwick; **Matt Hodgson**^{1}; Kane Koteka; Brynard Stander; Corey Thomas; Ross Haylett-Petty; **Ben McCalman**^{1}; Alex Rovira; **Scrum-halves**: Ian Prior; Michael Ruru; Justin Turner; **Fly-halves**: Luke Burton; Zack Holmes; Davis Tavita	**Centres**: Marcel Brache; Kyle Godwin; Ammon Matuauto; Junior Rasolea; **Wingers**: Nili Fielea; Koiatu Koiatu; Brad Lacey; Va'a Mailei; **Luke Morahan**; **Fullbacks**: Dane Haylett-Petty; Dillyn Leyds

(c) Team captain; Bold denotes player internationally capped at the time, ^{1} denotes allocated national player additional to the squad.

2007 Perth Spirit squad – ARC

**Props**: Pekahou Cowan; Gareth Hardy; Kieran Longbottom; Troy Takiari; AJ Whalley; **Hookers**: Luke Holmes; **Tai McIsaac**; Ryan Tyrrell; **Locks**: Tom Hockings; Sitaleki Timani; Rudi Vedelago; Luke Doherty; Scott Fardy	**Back row**: **Scott Fava**; Will Bloem; Richard Brown; David Pocock; **Halfbacks**: **Matt Henjak**; James Stannard; **Flyhalves**: Scott Daruda; Todd Feather; Jimmy Hilgendorf; Lachlan MacKay	**Centres**: Ryan Cross; Junior Pelesasa; Kane Allen; **Wings**: Ed Jenkins; Jackson Mullane; Dan Bailey; Nick Cummins; Haig Sare; Ratu Siganiyavi; **Fullbacks**: **Cameron Shepherd**; Luke McLean

(c) Denotes team captain, Bold denotes player internationally capped at the time, ^{1} denotes allocated national player additional to the squad.
