= Henjak =

Henjak is a surname. Notable people with the surname include:

- Ivan Henjak (born 1963), Australian rugby league player and coach
- Matt Henjak (born 1981), Australian rugby union player, nephew of Ivan
