= Bubba Lau'ese =

New Zealand-Samoan basketball player

Personal information
- Born: 13 September 1983 (age 43) Auckland, New Zealand
- Listed height: 198 cm (6 ft 6 in)
- Listed weight: 127 kg (280 lb)

Career information
- High school: Howick College (Auckland, New Zealand); Onehunga (Auckland, New Zealand)
- Playing career: 2010–2010
- Position: Forward

Career history
- 2010: Southland Sharks

Bubba Lau'ese (born Barry Papalii; 13 September 1983) is a New Zealand former rugby and basketball player.

== Early life ==
Lau'ese was born in Auckland, New Zealand. He attended Surrey Park Primary School in Invercargill, Southland, and Howick College and Onehunga High School in Auckland.

== Rugby and basketball ==
Lau'ese flirted with basketball at secondary school and club level, but made a name for himself on the rugby field. He narrowly missed out on a place in Samoa's squad for the 2007 Rugby World Cup and played second division rugby in Wales and France.

In 2009, Lau'ese was lured back to Invercargill by Rugby Southland and the Excelsior Rugby Club.

That same year, Lau'ese played on the same club basketball team as Southland Sharks coach Richard Dickel. He decided to give the Sharks trials a crack on Dickel's advice and was successful in making the inaugural roster for the 2010 New Zealand NBL season. He played in three NBL games for the Sharks. In July 2010, he played for the Southland Flyers in the Conference Basketball League.

== Personal life ==
As of February 2010, Lau'ese was a probation officer at the Department of Corrections.
