= Kevin Foote =

Kevin Foote may refer to:

- Kevin Foote (rugby union) (born 1979), South African professional rugby union player and coach
- Kevin Kelly (announcer) (born Kevin Foote, 1967), American wrestling announcer and manager
