= Tony Falkenstein =

Tony Falkenstein may refer to:

- Tony Falkenstein (American football)
- Tony Falkenstein (entrepreneur)
