= 2006 Australian Provincial Championship =

- Countries: Australia
- Date: 8–29 September 2006
- Champions: Brumbies (1st title)
- Runners-up: Reds
- Matches played: 7
- Tries scored: 41 (average 5.9 per match)
- Top point scorer: Julian Huxley, Brumbies (42)

The 2006 Australian Provincial Championship was the inaugural season of the Australian Provincial Championship (APC), a competition between Australia's four Super Rugby franchises organised by the Australian Rugby Union (ARU). Following a round-robin phase, a final was held between the two top sides, with the ACT Brumbies victorious over the Queensland Reds 42–17.

== Background and format ==
The 2006 Australian Provincial Championship was a re-launch of a previous domestic rugby union competition in Australia. It was announced by the ARU that the new competition would be launched in 2006 to give Super Rugby players extra high-level matches after the Super 14 season and help identify talent for the Wallabies, especially ahead of the 2007 Rugby World Cup. In January 2006 it was reported that the competition might be postponed to the June–July of 2007 following opposition from the New South Wales Rugby Union (NSWRU), whom preferred the September–October timing because it would not intrude on the Shute Shield. The competitions schedule was later announced to kick off in September 2006. It replaced the earlier Australian Rugby Shield (ARS) and involved only the four Australian Super Rugby franchises: the ACT Brumbies, New South Wales Waratahs, Queensland Reds, and Western Force. Wallabies players were left out to focus on developing fringe and emerging players. The format was a round-robin (each team played the others once), followed by a final between the top two teams. The competition ran over three weeks in September 2006, with matches held across New South Wales, Queensland, and the Australian Capital Territory, and concluded with a final on 29 September.

== Venues ==
The ACT Brumbies and Queensland Reds played their home games at local venues, whereas the Western Force did not play a home game throughout the tournament. The New South Wales Waratahs played two home games, one at Gosford's Central Coast Stadium, and another at Carrington Park in Bathurst. The Hunter Valley region were touted as potential hosts of a Waratahs fixture by the Newcastle and Hunter Rugby Union (NHRU) as compensation for missing out on staging a Super 14 trial match in January 2006.

| ACT Brumbies | New South Wales Waratahs | |
|---|---|---|
| Viking Park, Wanniassa | Central Coast Stadium, Gosford | Carrington Park, Bathurst |
| Capacity: 7,000 | Capacity: 20,059 | Capacity: 11,100 |
| 2006 Australian Provincial Championship is located in Australia | | Queensland Reds |
| 2006 Australian Provincial Championship is located in Australia | | Ballymore Stadium, Herston |
| 2006 Australian Provincial Championship is located in Australia | | Capacity: 18,000 |

== Ladder ==
| Pos | Team | Pld | W | D | L | PF | PA | PD | TF | TA | TB | LB | Pts | Qualification |
|---|---|---|---|---|---|---|---|---|---|---|---|---|---|---|
| 1 | ACT Brumbies (C) | 3 | 2 | 0 | 1 | 58 | 43 | +15 | 6 | 4 | 0 | 1 | 9 | Grand Final |
| 2 | Queensland Reds | 3 | 2 | 0 | 1 | 65 | 68 | −3 | 8 | 8 | 1 | 0 | 9 | Grand Final |
| 3 | Western Force | 3 | 1 | 0 | 2 | 75 | 72 | +3 | 10 | 9 | 2 | 0 | 6 | |
| 4 | New South Wales Waratahs | 3 | 1 | 0 | 2 | 71 | 86 | −15 | 9 | 12 | 1 | 1 | 6 | |

(C) Champion

== Fixtures ==
All kick-off times are local (AEST)

=== Round One ===
19:00 2006-09-08

| Brumbies | 14–13 | Waratahs |
| Tries: James McCormick; Pen: Julian Huxley (3) | | Tries: Penalty; Con: Peter Hewat; Pens: Peter Hewat (2) |

Viking Park, Canberra
Attendance: approx. 3000
Referee: Paul Marks

16:00 2006-09-09

| Reds | 6–32 | Force |
| Pen: Andrew Brown (2) | | Tries: Brett Stapleton (2), Brendan Cannon, Haig Sare; Con: Scott Daruda (2); Pen: Scott Daruda |

Ballymore, Brisbane
Attendance: 3,025
Referee: TBD

=== Round Two ===
19:00 2006-09-15

| Brumbies | 25–10 | Force |
| Tries: Francis Fainifo 2, James McCormack, Con: Julian Huxley (2); Pen: Julian Huxley | | Tries: Brett Stapleton, Con: Scott Daruda; 1 pen |

Viking Park, Canberra
Referee: B. Bowden

15:00 2006-09-17

| Waratahs | 17–39 | Reds |
| Tries: Adam Frier, Daniel Halangahu; Con: Peter Hewat; Pen: Peter Hewat | | Tries: Calaeb Brown 3, James Horwill, Henari Veratau, John Dart; Con: Lloyd Johansson 3 Pen: Lloyd Johansson |

Central Coast Stadium, Gosford
Attendance: 3,065
Referee: M. Goddard

=== Round Three ===
15:00 2006-09-23

| Waratahs | 41–33 | Force |
| Tries: T Davidson, B Robinson, M Turinui, B Jacobs, P Hewat (2); Con: D Halangahu (2), P Hewat (2); Pen: Pens: P Hewat | | Tries: S Daruda, M Henjak, T McIssac, C Sheperd (2); Con: S Daruda (4) |

Carrington Park, Bathurst
Attendance: 4,323
Referee: TBD

16:00 2006-09-23

| Reds | 20–19 | Brumbies |
| Tries: Ben Tune, Henari Veratau; Con: Lloyd Johansson (2); Pen: Lloyd Johansson (2) | | Tries: John Tawake, Al Campbell; Pen: Julian Huxley (3) |

Ballymore, Brisbane
Referee: TBD

== Grand Final ==
19:00 2006-09-29

| Brumbies | 42–17 | Reds |
| Tries: Tim Curran (2), Francis Fainifo, Tim Wright, Alister Campbell, Julian Huxley; Con: Julian Huxley (6) | | Tries: John Dart, Caleb Brown; Con: Andrew Brown (2); Pen: Lloyd Johansson |

Viking Park, Canberra
Attendance: 3500
Referee: Matt Goddard
