= Francois van Wyk =

South African rugby union player

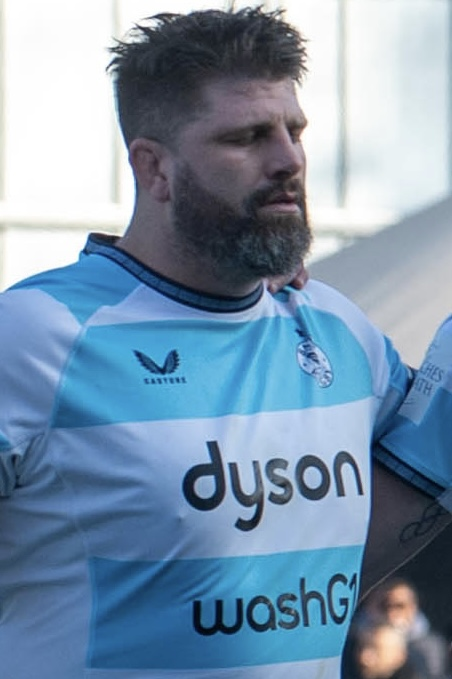
- Van Wyk ahead of Bath Rugby's match against Benetton Treviso, December 2024
- Full name: Francois Daniel van Wyk
- Born: 30 July 1991 (age 35) Bellville, South Africa
- Height: 1.89 m (6 ft 2 1/2 in)
- Weight: 114 kg (17 st 13 lb; 251 lb)
- School: Hoër Landbouskool Boland (Boland Agricultural High School)
- University: University of Cape Town; Varsity College (South Africa)

Rugby union career
- Position: Loosehead Prop
- Current team: Connacht
Youth career
- 2007–2009: Western Province
- 2010: Boland
- 2011–2012: Western Province
Amateur team(s)
Years	Team	Apps	(Points)
2011–2012	UCT Ikey Tigers	16	(10)
Senior career
Years	Team	Apps	(Points)
2013	Western Province	2	(0)
2014–2017	Western Force	20	(5)
2014–2017	Perth Spirit	7	(0)
2017–2021	Northampton Saints	84	(15)
2021–2024	Leicester Tigers	54	(35)
2024–2026	Bath	49	(30)
2026–	Connacht	1	(0)
- Correct as of 1 May 2026

Francois Daniel "Slak" van Wyk (born 30 July 1991) is a South African rugby union player who currently plays as a loosehead prop for Connacht rugby In the URC. He has previously played for Bath, Northampton Saints & Leicester Tigers in the Premiership, the Western Force in Super Rugby as well as Western Province in his native South Africa.

== Career ==
Van Wyk was born and raised in the Western Cape and played junior rugby for both Western Province and Boland. He was also a member of the UCT Ikey Tigers side which lifted the 2011 Varsity Cup, playing in all of his side's 9 games and featuring alongside future Western Force team-mate Marcel Brache.

Opportunities at provincial level proved harder to come by and he only managed 2 appearances for Western Province, both of which came during the 2013 Vodacom Cup. This limitation in game time saw him move to Australia to link up with the Perth based Western Force.

For 2014, Van Wyk was named as a member of the Force's Wider Training Group alongside Ollie Hoskins, Brad Lacey, Dillyn Leyds and Dylan Sage. He gained his first Super Rugby cap on 24 May 2014, replacing Pek Cowan in the final minute of his side's 29-19 win over the Lions in Perth.

It was announced on May 10, 2017 that Van Wyk would join English side Northampton Saints for the 2017/18 campaign. He will leave at the end of the 2020–21 season.

On 8 March 2021, it was confirmed that van Wyk would sign for local rivals Leicester Tigers in the Premiership Rugby from the 2021-22 season. Van Wyk made his Leicester debut against Exeter Chiefs on 18 September 2021. On 30 October 2021, van Wyk scored his first try for Leicester in the East Midlands Derby against his former club, Northampton Saints. Van Wyk was sent off on 3 December 2022 after coming on as a substitute in a match against Bristol Bears.

On 17 April 2024, Bath announced Van Wyk would join them for two seasons starting from that summer.

On 21 January 2026, it was confirmed that van Wyk would leave Bath to sign for Irish province Connacht in the URC competition for the 2026-27 season.

== Super Rugby statistics ==
As of 22 November 2017

Season	Team	Games	Starts	Sub	Mins	Tries	Cons	Pens	Drops	Points	Yel	Red
2014	Force	2	0	2	3	0	0	0	0	0	0	0
2015	Force	2	1	1	61	1	0	0	0	5	0	0
2016	Force	7	4	3	343	0	0	0	0	0	0	0
2017	Force	8	3	5	251	0	0	0	0	0	0	0
Total		19	8	11	661	1	0	0	0	5	0	0
