= Ross Haylett-Petty =

South African rugby player (born 1994)

- Born: 10 January 1994 (age 32) Durban, Natal, South Africa
- Height: 1.97 m (6 ft 6 in)
- Weight: 118 kg (18 st 8 lb; 260 lb)
- Notable relative: Dane Haylett-Petty (brother)

Rugby union career
- Position: Lock
- Current team: Rebels
Senior career
| Years | Team | Apps | (Points) |
| 2014–2017 | Perth Spirit | 14 | (20) |
| 2015−2017 | Force | 30 | (5) |
| 2018–2022 | Rebels | 43 | (5) |
| 2018 | Toshiba Brave Lupus | 4 | (0) |
| 2019 | Melbourne Rising | 6 | (10) |
- Correct as of 10 June 2022
International career
| Years | Team | Apps | (Points) |
| 2014 | Australia U20 | 5 | (5) |
- Correct as of 9 November 2015

Ross Haylett-Petty (born 10 January 1994) is a South African-born, Australian rugby union player who currently plays for the Melbourne Rebels in the international Super Rugby competition and Toshiba Brave Lupus in the Japanese Top League. Domestically he is contracted to the Perth Spirit who compete in the National Rugby Championship. His regular playing position is as a number eight.

Haylett-Petty represented Western Australia at Under-16 and State Schoolboy level and was selected as a member of the Australia under-20 side which competed in the 2014 IRB Junior World Championship in New Zealand. He scored 1 try in 5 matches to help his country finish 5th in the tournament.

Haylett-Petty currently studies a Master of Commerce at Deakin University.

== Super Rugby statistics ==
As of 30 May 2022

| Season | Team | Games | Starts | Sub | Mins | Tries | Cons | Pens | Drops | Points | Yel | Red |
|---|---|---|---|---|---|---|---|---|---|---|---|---|
| 2015 | Force | 2 | 0 | 2 | 13 | 0 | 0 | 0 | 0 | 0 | 0 | 0 |
| 2016 | Force | 13 | 10 | 3 | 790 | 0 | 0 | 0 | 0 | 0 | 0 | 0 |
| 2017 | Force | 15 | 15 | 0 | 1144 | 1 | 0 | 0 | 0 | 5 | 1 | 0 |
| 2018 | Rebels | 11 | 5 | 6 | 476 | 1 | 0 | 0 | 0 | 5 | 0 | 0 |
| 2019 | Rebels | 13 | 6 | 7 | 565 | 0 | 0 | 0 | 0 | 0 | 0 | 0 |
| 2020 | Rebels | 6 | 4 | 2 | 307 | 0 | 0 | 0 | 0 | 0 | 0 | 0 |
| 2020 AU | Rebels | 0 | 0 | 0 | 0 | 0 | 0 | 0 | 0 | 0 | 0 | 0 |
| 2021 AU | Rebels | 4 | 3 | 1 | 269 | 0 | 0 | 0 | 0 | 0 | 0 | 1 |
| 2021 TT | Rebels | 5 | 2 | 3 | 208 | 0 | 0 | 0 | 0 | 0 | 0 | 0 |
| 2022 | Rebels | 4 | 2 | 2 | 182 | 0 | 0 | 0 | 0 | 0 | 0 | 0 |
| Total | | 73 | 47 | 26 | 3,954 | 2 | 0 | 0 | 0 | 10 | 1 | 1 |
