= Vivienne Gray =

New Zealand professor of classics and ancient history

- Born: Vivienne Forbes; 29 October 1947
- Died: 9 June 2025 (aged 77)
- Awards: Rhodes Visiting Fellowship

Academic background
- Education: New Hall, University of Cambridge (PhD)

Academic work
- Institutions: University of Auckland

Vivienne Jean Gray (née Forbes; 29 October 1947 – 9 June 2025) was a New Zealand academic, and was emeritus professor of Classics and Ancient History at the University of Auckland, specialising in historians Herodotus and Xenophon. She was previously Public Orator for the university.

== Academic career ==
Gray was born in 1947. She grew up in Onehunga. In 1964 while still at high school, she went on an exchange to Australia organised by Lions Clubs International. She was educated at Onehunga High School, graduating in 1964. Gray received a postgraduate scholarship and completed a PhD at New Hall, University of Cambridge. In 1978, she was awarded a Rhodes Visiting Scholarship to Lady Margaret Hall at Oxford. Gray then joined the faculty of the University of Auckland, rising in 1987 to full professor, as the successor of W.K. Lacey in the Chair of Classics. She was also the university's Public Orator, giving the eulogies for honorary doctorates for Maurice Gee, Helen Clark, and Anand Satyanand, among others.

Gray was the invited guest speaker at the founding meeting of the Australasian Women in Ancient World Studies. She spoke about the lives of New Zealand scholars Agathe Thornton and Daphne Hereward. Gray retired in 2011 and was appointed professor emeritus at the University of Auckland.

Gray was a specialist on the Greek philosopher and historian Xenophon, and received international recognition of her work. She published five books on Xenophon, including a work on his Hellenica in 1989, explaining the form and function of the Hellenica, and arguing that it must first be understood as a literary work before it can be understood as an historical one. Gray followed this with a monograph on Xenophon's treatment of Socrates in 1998. Her 2007 book On Government describes three works on government, two by Xenophon ( the Constitution of the Lacedaemonians and the Hiero) and one previously ascribed to him (the Constitution of the Athenians). In 2010 she wrote the Oxford Readings volume on Xenophon. As of 2024, her most recent work was the 2011 Xenophon's Mirror of Princes, covering his work on leadership and arguing against the Straussian reading of irony in Xenophon's writings. Eve A. Browning described Gray as "a major driving force behind this Xenophon renaissance... whose energetic defense of his significance, uniqueness, philosophical depth, writing brilliance, and unified intellectual mission has been ongoing for two decades".

Gray died on 9 June 2025, aged 77.

== Selected works ==
=== Books ===
- Gray, Vivienne J. (1989) The character of Xenophon's Hellenica. Duckworth, London ISBN 0715622102
- Gray, Vivienne J. (1998) The framing of Socrates: the literary interpretation of Xenophon's memorabilia, Stuttgart: Steiner, 1998 ISBN 3 515 07313 2
- Gray, Vivienne J. (2007) Xenophon on Government. Cambridge Greek and Latin Classics. Cambridge University Press.
- Gray, Vivienne J. (2010) Xenophon. Oxford Readings in Classical Studies. Oxford University Press ISBN 9780199216185
- Gray, Vivienne J. (2011) Xenophon's Mirror of Princes: Reading the Reflections. Oxford University Press. ISBN 9780199563814

=== Other works ===
- Gray, Vivienne (30 August 2012), "Herodotus on Melampus", Myth, Truth, and Narrative in Herodotus, pp. 167–192
- Forbes, Vivienne Jean (2011). "Xenophon's Socrates and Democracy". Polis. 28 (1): 1–32. doi:10.1163/20512996-90000176. Wikidata Q130296007.
- Forbes, Vivienne Jean (2005). "Rewriting the Past in Fourth-Century Greece". The Classical Review. 55 (1): 49–50. doi:10.1093/clrevj/bni030. Wikidata Q130296006.
- Forbes, Vivienne Jean (2006). "THE LINGUISTIC PHILOSOPHIES OF PRODICUS IN XENOPHON'S 'CHOICE OF HERACLES'?". The Classical Quarterly. 56 (2): 426–435. doi:10.1017/s0009838806000437. Wikidata Q130295992.
- Forbes, Vivienne Jean (1991). "Continuous History and Xenophon, Hellenica 1-2.3.10". American Journal of Philology. 112 (2): 201. doi:10.2307/294718. Wikidata Q130296046.
- Forbes, Vivienne Jean (1990). "The moral interpretation of the 'second preface' to Arrian's Anabasis". The Journal of Hellenic Studies. 110: 180–186. doi:10.2307/631740. JSTOR 631740. Wikidata Q60201648.
