= Ollie Hoskins (rugby union) =

Australia international rugby union player

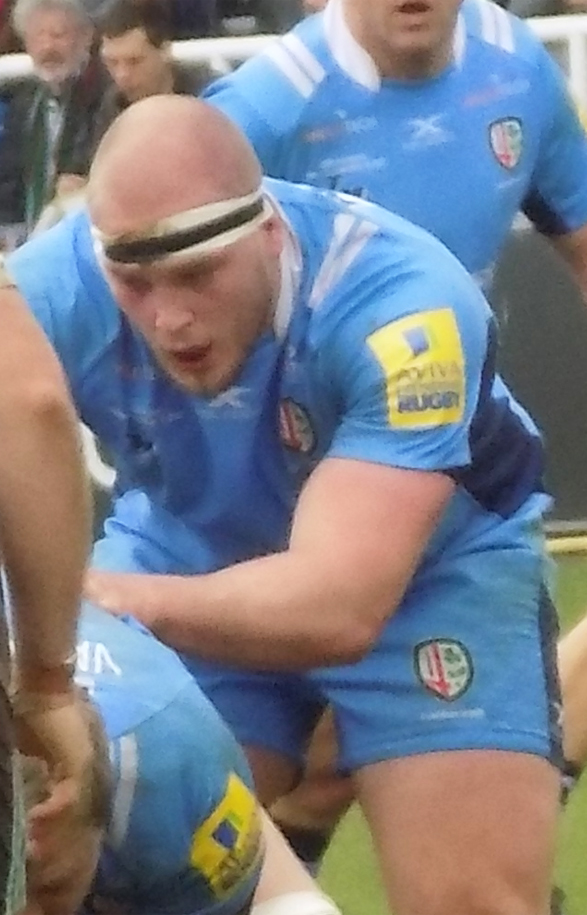
- Hoskins playing for London Irish, 2018
- Full name: Oliver Matthew David Hoskins
- Born: 6 March 1993 (age 33) Perth, Western Australia
- Height: 1.91 m (6 ft 3 in)
- Weight: 128 kg (20 st 2 lb; 282 lb)
- School: Scotch College, Perth

Rugby union career
- Position: Tighthead Prop
- Current team: Saracens
Youth career
- 2012–2013: Western Force
Senior career
Years	Team	Apps	(Points)
2014–2016	Western Force	26	(0)
2014−2015	Perth Spirit	15	(10)
2016–2023	London Irish	150	(100)
2023-2025	Saracens	18	(0)
2025	Western Force	1	(0)
International career
Years	Team	Apps	(Points)
2012–2014	Australia Under-20	7	(0)
2021	Australia	1	(0)
- Correct as of 14 November 2021

Ollie Hoskins (born 6 March 1993) is an Australian rugby union international player who started his career as a prop for the Western Force in Super Rugby and signed with London Irish in March 2016. When the club folded, Hoskins was signed by Saracens in June 2023. Hoskins played one last game for the Western Force against the British and Irish Lions in 2025.

== Career ==
Hoskins was born and raised in Perth, Western Australia and represented his state at various age-group levels during his school days. He was a member of the Force training squad for both the 2012 and 2013 Super Rugby seasons. During this time he gained useful international experience with appearances against Samoa A in the IRB Nations Cup and a Tongan XV side at the beginning of 2013.

For 2014, Hoskins was named as a member of the Force's Wider Training Group alongside Brad Lacey, Dillyn Leyds, Dylan Sage and Francois van Wyk. He gained his first Super Rugby cap in the Force's opening round defeat to the Waratahs in Sydney, replacing Kieran Longbottom in the 59th minute of the game.

On 28 April 2016 it was announced that Hoskins would join Green King IPA Championship side London Irish for the 2016-17 season. Hoskins was a regular starter as Irish were promoted at the close of the 2016-17 RFU Championship season. Earning 24 caps in total. Since the 2016-17 season, Hoskins has racked up 64 caps for London Irish and in the 2018-19 season was voted Supporters Player of the Season.

== International ==
Hoskins was the starting tighthead prop of the Australia Under-20 squad for the 2012 IRB Junior World Championship in South Africa and the 2013 tournament in France.

In 2021, Hoskins was drafted into Dave Rennie’s Wallabies squad to potentially cover for Taniela Tupou, who had suffered a head collision in the Scotland game, prior to their clash with England. He made his debut at Twickenham coming on as a substitute on 13 November 2021.

== Super Rugby statistics ==
As of 20 June 2016

Season	Team	Games	Starts	Sub	Mins	Tries	Cons	Pens	Drops	Points	Yel	Red
2014	Force	15	0	15	173	0	0	0	0	0	0	0
2015	Force	11	0	11	155	0	0	0	0	0	0	0
2016	Force	0	0	0	0	0	0	0	0	0	0	0
Total		26	0	26	328	0	0	0	0	0	0	0

== External ==
- Article title
