= Kane Koteka =

Australian rugby union player (born 1994)

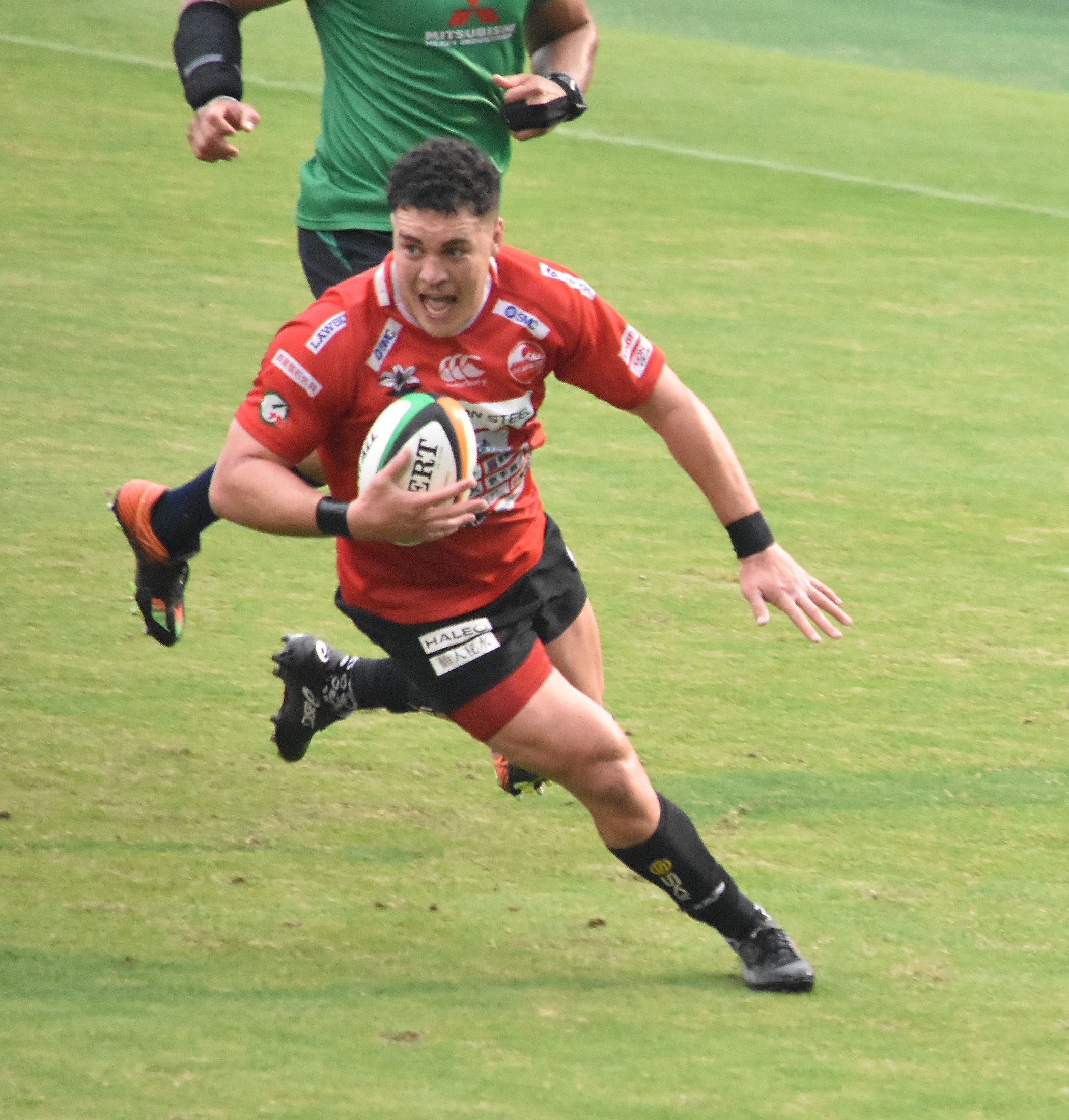
- Koteka in 2019
- Full name: Kane Koteka
- Born: 8 January 1994 (age 32) Perth, Western Australia
- Height: 1.82 m (6 ft 0 in)
- Weight: 100 kg (15 st 10 lb; 220 lb)
- Notable relative: Paul Koteka (uncle)

Rugby union career
- Position: Flanker
- Current team: Perth Spirit / Force
Senior career
Years	Team	Apps	(Points)
2014–	Perth Spirit	15	(30)
2015−2017, 2020-2022, 2024-2026	Force	44	(5)
2018-2019	Kamaishi Seawaves		
- Correct as of 27 May 2026

Kane Koteka (born 8 January 1994) is an Australian professional rugby union player who currently plays for the Western Force in the international Super Rugby competition and the Perth Spirit in the National Rugby Championship. His regular playing position is as a loose forward.

== Career ==
Born and raised in Perth, Koteka made his way up through the ranks in Western Australian rugby representing their Under 20 and Combined States sides before getting his big breakthrough in 2014 when he was a member of the Perth Spirit team which competed in the inaugural National Rugby Championship. He made 9 appearances and scored 3 tries as the Spirit reached the grand final only to go down 37–26 to Brisbane City.

Koteka was not initially named in the Force squad for the 2015 Super Rugby season, however he was signed up on a short-term contract a few weeks into the campaign and made his debut on 27 February 2015 in a 42–13 loss at home to the Hurricanes.

== Super Rugby statistics ==
As of 25 July 2016

Season	Team	Games	Starts	Sub	Mins	Tries	Cons	Pens	Drops	Points	Yel	Red
2015	Force	10	3	7	276	0	0	0	0	0	0	0
2016	Force	1	0	1	19	0	0	0	0	0	0	0
Total		11	3	8	295	0	0	0	0	0	0	0
