= Dane Haylett-Petty =

Australian rugby union player (born 1989)

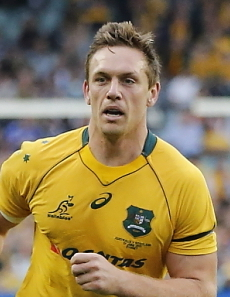
- Full name: Dane Haylett-Petty
- Born: 18 June 1989 (age 37) Durban, Natal, South Africa
- Height: 1.90 m (6 ft 3 in)
- Weight: 96 kg (15 st 2 lb; 212 lb)
- School: Hale School, Perth
- Notable relative: Ross Haylett-Petty (brother)

Rugby union career
- Position: Fullback / Wing
Senior career
Years	Team	Apps	(Points)
2010–2013	Biarritz	52	(25)
2013–2014	Tokyo Shokki Shuttles	6	(5)
2014	Perth Spirit	6	(5)
- Correct as of 16 June 2019
Super Rugby
Years	Team	Apps	(Points)
2008–2010	Force	9	(5)
2014–2017	Force	43	(40)
2018–2021	Rebels	33	(60)
- Correct as of 7 November 2021
International career
Years	Team	Apps	(Points)
2007	Australia Schoolboys		
2008–2009	Australia U20		
2016–2020	Australia	38	(60)
- Correct as of 7 November 2021
National sevens team
Years	Team		Comps
2008–2009	Australia		

Dane Haylett-Petty (born 18 June 1989) is a retired Australian rugby union footballer who played as a fullback or wing for the Melbourne Rebels in Super Rugby and the Wallabies.

== Early life ==
Haylett-Petty was born in Durban in the former Province of Natal in South Africa. His family moved to Perth, Western Australia when Haylett-Petty was 10-years-old and attended the Hale School from 2000 to 2007 in the suburb of Wembley Downs. He played rugby for the Australia 'A' Schoolboys team in 2007.

== Career ==
Haylett-Petty started out his senior career with the Western Force during the 2008 Super 14 season where he made his début against the Chiefs in Perth. He made a total of 12 appearances spanning three seasons before heading north in 2010 to join French Top 14 side Biarritz. He stayed in France for 3 years, making more than 50 appearances before it was announced that he would head back home to join the Force for the 2014 Super Rugby season.

On August 11, 2017, the it was announced that the Western Force would be the Australian team axed from Super Rugby. Subsequently, Haylett-Petty and younger brother Ross officially signed for the Melbourne Rebels on two year deals starting in 2018.

Haylett-Petty announced his retirement in November 2021, due to ongoing concussion.

== International career ==
Haylett-Petty represented Australia Under 20 in the 2008 and 2009 IRB Junior World Championships and he jointly holds the record for the most tries scored by a single player in a JWC match. His haul of 4 tries against Canada Under 20 in 2008 is equalled only by compatriots Kurtley Beale and Richard Kingi against the same opposition in 2009 and New Zealander Julian Savea against Samoa Under 20 in 2010.

He is also a former Australia Sevens player and featured in the IRB Sevens World Series in 2008 and 2009.

== Super Rugby statistics ==
As of 12 June 2021

Season	Team	Games	Starts	Sub	Mins	Tries	Cons	Pens	Drops	Points	Yel	Red
2008	Force	3	2	1	166	0	0	0	0	0	0	0
2009	Force	0	0	0	0	0	0	0	0	0	0	0
2010	Force	5	3	2	242	1	0	0	0	5	0	0
2014	Force	9	9	0	514	1	0	0	0	5	0	0
2015	Force	10	9	1	735	1	0	0	0	5	1	0
2016	Force	15	15	0	1183	3	0	0	0	15	0	0
2017	Force	9	9	0	646	3	0	0	0	15	0	0
2018	Rebels	11	10	1	673	5	0	0	0	25	1	0
2019	Rebels	11	11	0	850	2	0	0	0	10	0	0
2020	Rebels	6	6	0	480	3	0	0	0	15	0	0
2020 AU	Rebels	5	5	0	315	2	0	0	0	10	0	0
2021 AU	Rebels	0	0	0	0	0	0	0	0	0	0	0
2021 TT	Rebels	0	0	0	0	0	0	0	0	0	0	0
Total		84	79	5	5998	21	0	0	0	105	3	0
