= Jordan Macey =

Australian rugby union player

Jordan Macey (born 1983) is an Australian professional rugby union & league player, currently based in the Australian Capital Territory, having previously played for Melrose in Scotland.

== Early life ==
Macey grew up in Port Macquarie on the Mid North Coast of New South Wales, where he played rugby league for the Port Macquarie Sharks, before signing to play with the Wests Tigers.

== Rugby career ==
Macey played as a fullback for the West Magpies in the NSW premier league competition. In 2005 he signed to play with the Manly Sea Eagles in the NRL. His NRL career was cut short following a freak training incident involving head coach Des Hasler.

While out injured Macey signed a contract with Northern Suburbs in Sydney's club rugby competition. Macey was also a Squad member of the Central Coast Rays in the Australian Rugby Championship in 2007.

In 2008 Macey joined Scottish premier team Melrose and won the Scottish Cup, also being nominated for Scottish Player of the Year.

== International career ==
Macey represented the Australian Sevens team in 2006.

== Coaching career ==
Macey moved into coaching following his playing career. In 2024, he guided the Canberra Raiders Jersey Flegg Cup team to the minor premiership, finishing first in the regular season.[6] Macey is currently the coach of the Raiders' under-21s team for 2025.
