= Harry Hockings =

Japan international rugby union player

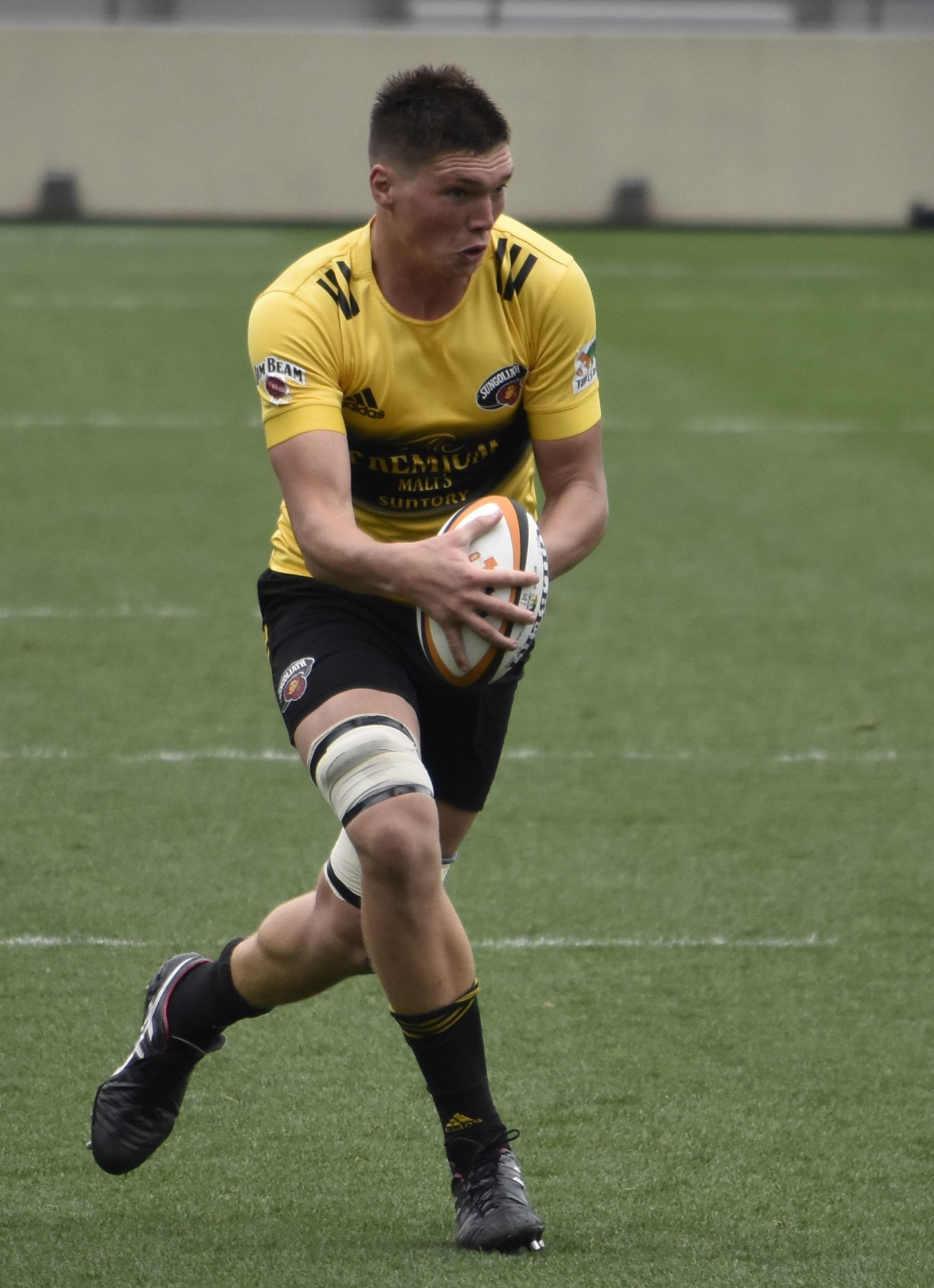
- Hockings with Tokyo Sungoliath in 2021
- Born: 28 July 1998 (age 28) Proserpine, Queensland, Australia
- Height: 206 cm (6 ft 9 in)
- Weight: 118 kg (18 st 8 lb; 260 lb)
- School: Anglican Church Grammar School
- Notable relative: Tom Hockings (brother)

Rugby union career
- Position: Lock
- Current team: Tokyo Sungoliath
Amateur team(s)
Years	Team	Apps	(Points)
2016	University of Queensland		
Senior career
Years	Team	Apps	(Points)
2017–2019	Queensland Country	26	(5)
2018–2020	Reds	28	(0)
2021–	Tokyo Sungoliath	92	(75)
International career
Years	Team	Apps	(Points)
2015	Australian Schoolboys		
2016–2018	Australia U20	10	(12)
2025–	Japan	12	(10)

Harry Hockings (born 28 July 1998) is a professional rugby union player who currently plays as a lock for the Tokyo Sungoliath in the Japan Rugby League One (JRLO) competition. Born in Australia, Hockings represents the Japan national team at senior international level.
