= Onehunga High School =

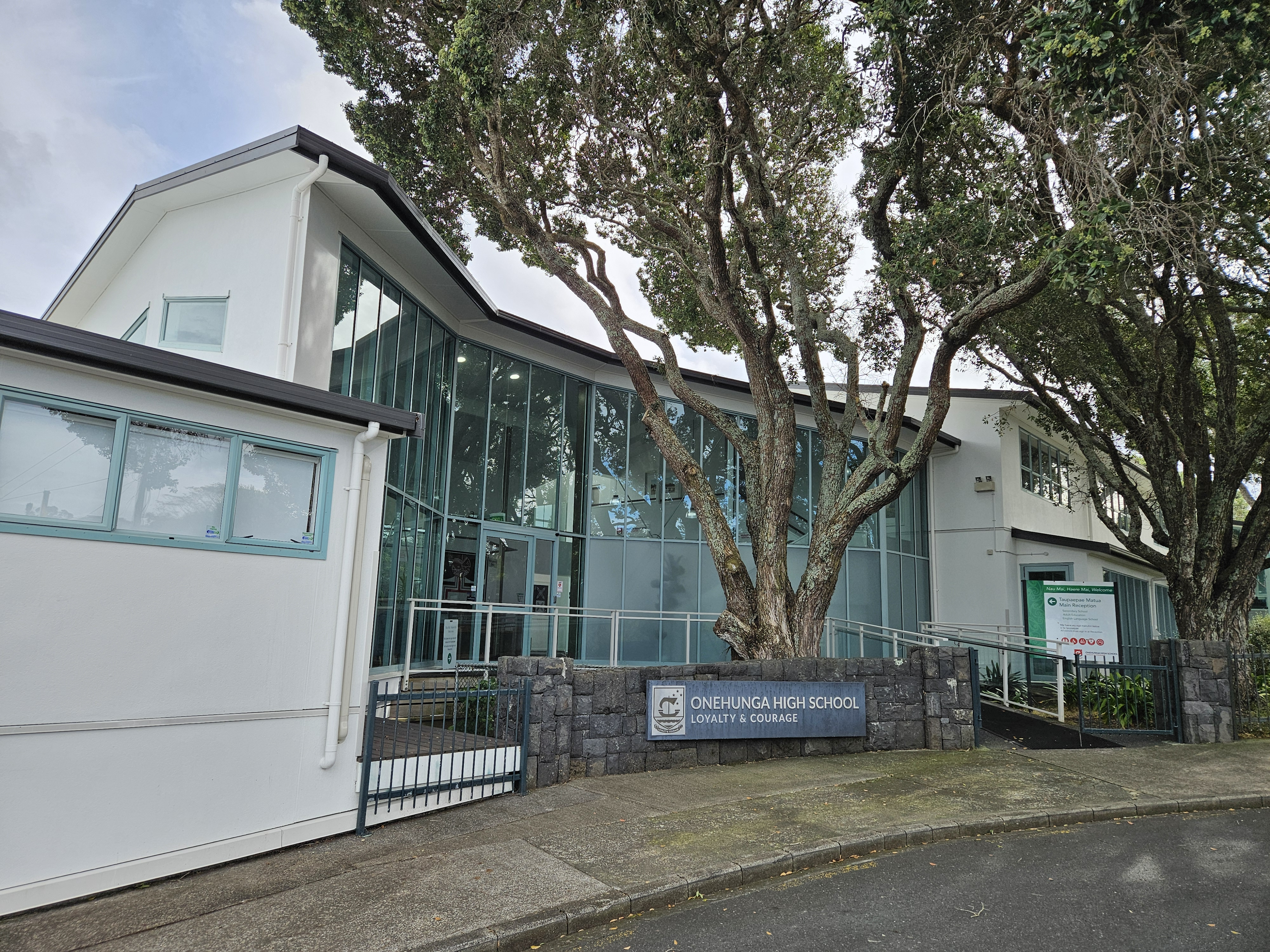

Location
- Pleasant Street, Onehunga, Auckland, New Zealand; 36.9192°S 174.7704°E

Information
- Type: State Coeducational secondary (Year 9–13)
- Motto: Loyalty & Courage
- Established: 1959
- Ministry of Education Institution no.: 86
- Principal: Shameen Hayat
- Years offered: 9–13
- Enrolment: 1,010 (July 2026)
- Socio-economic decile: Equity Index: 478
- Website: ohs.school.nz

Onehunga High School is a state co-educational secondary school in the Auckland suburb of Onehunga, New Zealand which provides education for students in Years 9 to 13.

The school attracts students from the suburbs of Onehunga, Māngere Bridge, Hillsborough, and Royal Oak and accepts a limited number of students from outside its zone.

== History ==
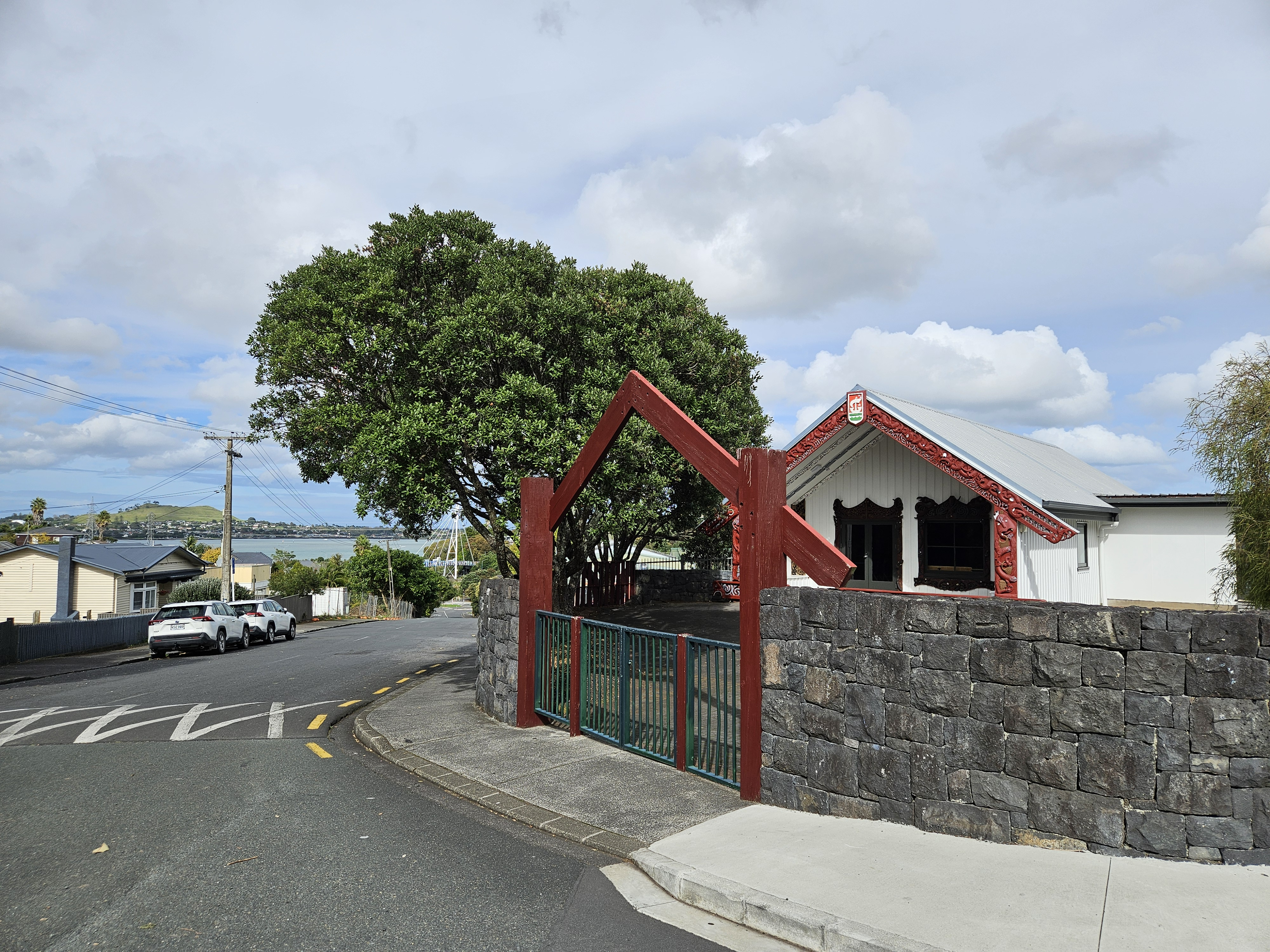
Te Haerenga, the school marae (right), with Māngere Mountain and the Manukau Harbour in the background

Onehunga High School was "founded" in 1959 by Mr J. C. McCarthy on its Pleasant Street site. At its birth the roll was 190 students but it has grown slowly to a peak of over 1,500. McCarthy was principal from the foundation until his retirement 19 years later.

Onehunga is situated in one of Auckland's suburbs' overlooking the Manukau Harbour. Many Onehunga High School families have long histories in the area and a large number of the students are second- or third- generation students. The school's proximity to Onehunga and Penrose's industrial and retail area has enabled links with some service clubs and businesses, including scholarships and trust funds.

In the early days the school was mono-cultural in character, but during the 1980s it developed towards a multi-cultural school, with increasing numbers of Māori, Polynesian and Asian students. Today the school is strongly international and enjoys all the qualities a wide range of cultures bring.

In the 1980s as part of wider decentralisation changes in the New Zealand education system, the school was provided self-governance under a board of trustees system. In 1996, Onehunga High School opened Te Haerenga, the school marae. From 2000, the school underwent a modernisation and development programme. In 2024 the school created a new learning culture using values in the acronym WAKA.

The school has always received students from Onehunga, Royal Oak, Hillsborough and Māngere Bridge. The main feeder school is Royal Oak Intermediate. With the change of principal in 2022 the roll has increased massively.

== Enrolment ==
As of July 2026, Onehunga High School has a roll of 1,010 students, of which 201 (19.9%) identify as Māori.

As of 2026, the school has an Equity Index of 478, placing it amongst schools whose students have above average socioeconomic barriers to achievement (roughly equivalent to deciles 4 and 5 under the former socio-economic decile system).

== Premises ==
In 2022 the school completed major redevelopments, including a new tech block, gym and courtyard. The tech block named Te Kupenga Wānanga has purpose- built, state-of-the art facilities for science, wood-work and cooking. The new gym is large enough for 2 basketball courts and a full school assembly.

== Academics ==
In 2024 the school had one of their highest NCEA pass rates with 71% in Level 1 (25% above national), 79% in Level 2 (5% above national), and 82% in Level 3 (12% above national).

Unlike other schools OHS has chosen to continue running NCEA Level 1 for the time being

=== Academic divisions ===
In addition to the normal academic departments by learning areas, Onehunga High School has the following internal divisions at the Pleasant St campus:

- The Business School
- The Construction School
- The Services Academy

==== Onehunga High Business School ====
Onehunga High Business School logo

The school previously incorporated a business school, founded in 2002 which attracted significant amounts of media publicity at them time, and visits from many notable people including the Rt Hon Helen Clark (New Zealand Prime Minister at the time) and Rt Hon John Key (Leader of the Opposition). The Business School played a key role in creating better recognition for business standards and got them included in NCEA. It was founded by Just Water International's creator Tony Falkenstein, and was sponsored by brewery company Lion Nathan.

==== Onehunga High Construction School ====
The Building and Construction School is a vocational division which provides opportunities for students to explore their interests in this trade. This program was previously sponsored by Fletcher Construction.

==== Onehunga High Services Academy ====
The Services Academy is a unit focusing on preparing students who are looking for a future career in the New Zealand Defence Force or police. This program was disestablished in 2024.

== Principals ==
- Con McCarthy 1959–1978
- Ken Prebble 1978–1990
- Chris Saunders 1990–2007
- Deidre Shea 2007–2022
- Shameen Hayat 2023 – present

== Student life ==
=== Music And Performing Arts ===
Students are encouraged to participate in performing arts activities. The school has several performing arts groups which perform regularly at school and community functions. All "Year 9" students are offered instrumental (guitar, drums, trumpet) or voice tuition. Talent shows are held regularly which provide an opportunity for young performers to display their talents.

"Stage Challenge" involves up to 150 students in a student-directed and choreographed dance and drama spectacular.

Each year, until 2009, one Onehunga High School student wins a scholarship (provided by Tony Falkenstein) to attend the Cazadero Performing Arts Camp in California, US. In 2010, the scholarship was altered and now it sends two OHS students to Geelong Music Camp in Australia.

"Bring It On" involves up to 100 students in a student-choreographed hip hop-based dance. Onehunga High School placed 1st in the 2010 Bring It On Grand Final and 2nd in 2009.

=== OHS Sports ===
Onehunga High School offers a wide range of sports and has had success during its school history. Their Premier Boys Basketball team and 1st XV Boys Rugby Team are currently competing in Auckland's Premier Grades Respectively. They have collected many Auckland Titles through their sports teams and have also won National honors in Softball (2002) and most recently have become the 2012 1st XV Co-ed national champions stating their place as the best Co-Ed rugby school in NZ.

=== Robotics ===
Onehunga High School has adopted Vex robotics as an extracurricular programme, enabling students to spend lunchtimes and weekends designing, building and programming their own robots. The school's teams have been extremely successful.

2012 has seen Onehunga High School become world champions at the Vex Robotics Championships. The championship, in 2012, was held in Los Angeles – involving more than 10,000 intermediate, high school and university students, teachers and mentors from 20 countries who competed and won at regional and national contests to qualify for the world championships. Onehunga, as well as winning overall, also took the top prize as Engineering Division Champions.

== Notable alumni ==
- Alan Dale – Actor
- Kahn Fotuali'i – Rugby (Tasman, Canterbury Crusader, Samoan International)
- Clayton Friend – Rugby League – Kiwi International, NRL – (North Sydney Bears)
- Vivienne Gray, emeritus professor of classics and ancient history at University of Auckland
- Shea Ili – Basketball (New Zealand Breakers)
- Stacey Ili – Rugby (Auckland, Connacht)
- Bubba Lau'ese – Rugby & Basketball (Samoa Rugby & Southland Sharks)
- Andrew Makalio – Rugby (Tasman, Crusaders)
- Sililo Martens – Rugby (Nz School Boys, Tongan International)
- Bailey Mes – Netball (Northern Mystics & Silver Fern)
- Taniela Moa – Rugby (Auckland Blues, Waikato Chief and Tongan International)
- Isa Nacewa – Rugby (Auckland Blues & Fijian International)
- Ramesh Patel – NZ Hockey player & Gold Medalist at 1976 Montreal Olympic games
- Junior Pelesasa – Rugby (Australian School Boys, Queensland Reds, Australian International)
- James Pickering – Rugby League – NRL(Canterbury Bulldogs, Sydney Roosters, Fiji International)
- Madeleine Sami – Actor, Comedian & Singer
- Taleni Seu – Rugby (Auckland, Chiefs)
- Jimmy Thunder – Boxer (IBO, OPBF, WBC, IBF, Pan Pacific, Australian & WBC Continental Americas Heavyweight Titles)
- Munokoa Tunupopo – Cricket (Auckland and New Zealand)
- Samiu Vahafolau – Rugby (Nz U19 & 21 player of the year, Otago Highlander, Tongan International)
- Sue Wood – Politician (First woman president of the National Party from 1982 to 1986)

Groups

- Purest Form – R&B Singing Group (Rainbows End Theme Song)
- SWIDT – Rap Group
