= Shon Siemonek =

New Zealand rugby union footballer and entrepreneur

- Occupations: Director, Brus Media Pty Ltd
- Website: www.brusmedia.com

Shon Siemonek is a New Zealand-born ex-rugby union player for the Ballymore Tornadoes in the Australian Rugby Championship, where he played as a loose-head prop. Siemonek is a current director of Brus Media Pty Ltd a mobile gaming affiliate network and development studio.

== Early life ==
Siemonek attended what is now called the Wellington Institute of Technology in early 2000 completing a Bachelor in Information Technology by late 2004. After graduating, Siemonek completed post graduate study specialising in ASP .NET before moving into his first job as a web developer.

After moving to Australia in 2005, Siemonek pursued curiosity of the entrepreneurial lifestyle and started, succeeded and failed with many small endeavours.

It wasn't until 2013 that Siemonek moved into mobile marketing and mobile gaming before forming Brus Media.

== Rugby ==
Born in Napier, Hawke's Bay, New Zealand, Siemonek attended St Bernards College in Lower Hutt where he played in the school's 1st XV rugby union team, 1st XIII rugby league team and excelled in cricket and croquet.

After leaving high-school Siemonek continued his rugby union career at Hutt Old Boys Marist Rugby Football Club in Lower Hutt where he played with the All Black Piri Weepu, and Hurricane Jeremy Thrush. During his last year of high school Siemonek switched from the wing to prop and he continued his development in this position before moving to Australia in 2004.

In 2007, Siemonek was selected in the Ballymore Tornadoes squad to contest the inaugural Australian Rugby Championship. Siemonek is a powerful scrummager and a damaging ball runner.
