= David Wessels =

South African rugby union coach

- Born: 1982 (age 43–44) Cape Town, Cape Province, South Africa
- School: St Stithians College
- University: University of Cape Town

Rugby union career
Coaching career
- Years: Team
- 2008–2009: Stormers (consultant)
- 2009–2011: UCT Ikey Tigers (assistant)
- 2012–2013: Brumbies (consultant)
- 2014–2016: Western Force (assistant)
- 2014: Perth Spirit
- 2016–2017: Western Force
- 2017–2021: Melbourne Rebels

David Wessels (born 1983), is a South African-Australian professional rugby union football coach. He is currently General Manager of High Performance at SA Rugby.

He was previously head coach of the Melbourne Rebels team that compete in the Super Rugby competition. Before moving to Melbourne, Dave became the youngest head coach in Super Rugby history when he was appointed head coach at the Western Force, in Perth and co-head coach of the Perth Spirit in Australia's National Rugby Championship. South African born, Wessels is a naturalised Australian citizen.

Wessels was born in Cape Town, South Africa, he then moved to Johannesburg where he attended St Stithians College before enrolling at Cape Town University where he completed a Masters in Information Technology. He was a defensive consultant under Rassie Erasmus to the Super Rugby team the Stormers in 2008 and 2009, before being appointed as an assistant coach at UCT (Ikeys) in the Varsity Cup from 2009 to 2011.

He moved to Australia as an assistant coach to the Brumbies under head coach Jake White in 2012, and had a significant influence on the rejuvenated Brumbies with the team conceding the fewest points in the Australian Conference and the second least in the Super Rugby competition. He joined the Western Force as the senior assistant coach for the 2013 Super Rugby season. Wessels was appointed, alongside Kevin Foote, as co-head coach of the Perth Spirit winning the inaugural season of Australia's National Rugby Championship in 2014.

Wessels became the caretaker head coach of the Western Force for the last three games of 2016, before being appointed as head coach for the 2017 Super Rugby season.

Following the Australian Rugby Union's decision to exclude the Force from Super Rugby after the 2017 season, Wessels joined the Melbourne Rebels as head coach in September 2017, signing a two-year deal with the team. He coached the team for three and a half seasons before departing ahead of the Super Rugby Trans-Tasman competition in 2021.

Wessels then returned to Cape Town and was appointed as Head of Rugby for the DHL Stormers, overseeing a very successful period at the club which saw them win the inaugural URC (United Rugby Championship) competition and host the final in back-to-back seasons. He was headhunted for the role at SA Rugby by two-time World Cup winning coach Rassie Erasmus.

Wessels holds various club records, including 'most winning seasons' at his previous three clubs (Western Force, Melbourne Rebels and DHL Stormers)
