= Australian Provincial Championship =

Now-defunct rugby union football competition in Australia

- Sport: Rugby Union football
- Inaugural season: 2006 APC (first and only); 1998 Ricoh Championship; 1968 Wallaby Trophy
- Number of teams: 4 (2006)
- Country: Australia
- Last champions: ACT Brumbies (2006)
- Broadcast partner: Fox Sports

The Australian Provincial Championship, or APC was a rugby union competition played in Australia in 2006. It was the successor to the Ricoh National Championship which had ended in the year 2000, and the Wallaby Trophy which began in the late 1960s.

The Australian Provincial Championship was played as a single round-robin, with the top two teams playing off in a final for the title. Teams in the APC were the ACT Brumbies, New South Wales Waratahs, Queensland Reds, and Western Force. The APC ran for just one season in 2006 before the competition was replaced by the Australian Rugby Championship for the 2007 season.

== History ==
Wallaby Trophy Champions
1968–9	Sydney
1970	NSW Country
1971	Queensland
1972	Sydney
1973	Sydney
1974	NSW Country
1975	NSW Country (Div II–ACT)
1976	Queensland* (Div II—Vic.)
1977	not contested (Div II—Vic.)
* Queensland's win in 1976 was unofficial as the ARFU tournament funding had been cancelled.
Ricoh National Championship
1998	NSW Waratahs
1999	ACT Brumbies
2000	Queensland Reds
Australian Provincial Championship
2006	ACT Brumbies

The Wallaby Trophy and Ricoh National Championship were the top level provincial rugby union competitions in Australia prior to the Australian Provincial Championship.

=== Wallaby Trophy: 1968 to 1976 ===
The Wallaby Trophy began in 1968, contested by representative teams from Sydney, NSW Country, Queensland, and Victoria. Victoria also competed in the Southern States Carnival against Western Australia, South Australia and Tasmania, and these other teams were eventually formed into a second division of the Wallaby Trophy along with the Australian Capital Territory and, later, Queensland Country. In June 1976 the ARFU announced the suspension of funding to the Wallaby Trophy competition due to financial difficulties. After 1976 there was no provincial championship for another two decades, although the Southern States Carnivals continued on.

Provincial rugby matches were still played, but not as part of an overall national competition. The NSW Waratahs and Queensland Reds continued to play annual interstate games, sometimes referred to as State of the Union matches. In the 1980s and 90s, NSW and Queensland also played in the transnational SPC, Super 6 and Super 10 tournaments. Limited resources outside the rugby strongholds of Sydney and Brisbane had curtailed options for expansion in Australia until the ACT Brumbies team was formed to join the Super 12 competition in 1996.

=== Ricoh National Championship: 1998 to 2000 ===
In 1998 the State of the Union was augmented to accommodate the Brumbies with the formation of the Ricoh National Championship. This competition continued in 1999 and 2000. Over the three years, the championship was won once by each team; the Waratahs, Brumbies, and Reds.

=== Australian Provincial Championship: 2006 ===
In 2006, the Australian Provincial Championship was formed, with the Western Force joining the Waratahs, Brumbies and Reds after the Super 14 tournament to compete for the Bob Templeton trophy. The ACT Brumbies won the Championship in 2006, defeating the Queensland Reds in the final played in Canberra. It was suggested that in 2007 or 2008 some Japanese teams could play this competition, but the APC was discontinued beyond 2006. It was replaced by the Australian Rugby Championship.

== Format ==
The APC tournament was played as a single round-robin, with the top two teams playing off in a final. The points system used for the APC was the same as used for the Super 14; four points for a win, two for a draw, with bonus points being awarded to teams scoring four tries or more in one match and/or losing by seven points or less.

The four teams were as strong as possible, but without their respective Wallabies due to the South African leg of the 2006 Tri Nations Series. The Western Force ended up having all-away fixtures, whilst the Brumbies played all their games on Friday nights, the Waratahs took matches to Gosford and Bathurst, whilst the Reds played afternoon matches at Ballymore. The ACT Brumbies defeated the Queensland Reds by 42–17 in the 2006 final played at Viking Park in Canberra.

== See also ==
- Australian Rugby Championship (defunct)
- Australian Rugby Shield (defunct)
- National Rugby Championship
- National Women's Rugby Championship
- Super Rugby AUS
