= Ben Coridas =

- Born: 17 April 1988 (age 38)
- Height: 194 cm (6 ft 4 in)
- Weight: 106 kg (234 lb)

Rugby union career
- Position: Flanker
Super Rugby
Years	Team	Apps	(Points)
2011	Reds	2	(0)

Ben Coridas (born 17 April 1988) is an Australian former professional rugby union player.

== Biography ==
A Wollongbar-Alstonville product, Coridas came to rugby union by accident, having intended to play rugby league until his mother enrolled him in the wrong club. He attended Alstonville High School.

=== Rugby career ===
Coridas, a dreadlocked flanker, was an Australian under-20s player and represented Australia in rugby sevens.

Following a period in the Waratahs development squad, Coridas was signed on a rookie contract, but after not getting opportunities moved to Brisbane and joined the Queensland Reds academy. He was called into Ewen McKenzie's side for Super Rugby matches against the Brumbies and Western Force in 2011.
