= Kevin Foote (rugby union) =

South African rugby union player

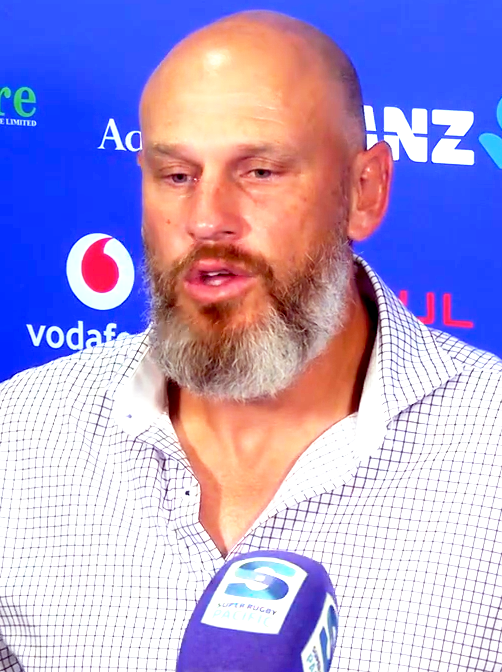
- Born: Kevin Foote; 22 March 1979 (age 47) Johannesburg, South Africa

Rugby union career
- Position(s): Centre, Head coach of South Africa U20
Amateur team(s)
Years	Team	Apps	(Points)
2005	Sunshine Coast Stingrays		
2005–2007	UCT Ikey Tigers		
Senior career
Years	Team	Apps	(Points)
2001	Natal Wildebeest		
2005	SWD Eagles	3	(0)
National sevens team
Years	Team		Comps
2002–2004	South Africa 7s		8
Coaching career
- Years: Team
- 2014, 2017: Perth Spirit
- 2011–2013: UCT Ikey Tigers
- 2021–2024: Melbourne Rebels (interim)
- 2025-: South Africa U20

Kevin Foote (born 22 March 1979) is a South African professional rugby union football coach and a former player for the South African sevens national team. He is the head coach of the South Africa U20 side (Junior Springboks), whom he led to back-to-back World Rugby U20 Championship titles in 2025 and 2026. He previously served as interim head coach of the Melbourne Rebels.

== Family and early life ==
Foote was born in Johannesburg, South Africa, where he attended the King Edward VII School. He began studying at Rand Afrikaans University in Johannesburg before transferring to Stellenbosch University in 1999.

== Rugby career ==
Foote played for the Natal Wildebeest in the Vodacom Cup in 2001. He won 43 caps for the South African sevens team between 2002 and 2004, and captained the team. He played in eight IRB Sevens World Series tournaments during the 2002–03 and 2003–04 seasons. In 2005, Foote had a brief stint with the Sunshine Coast Stingrays club in Queensland, Australia, before he returned to Cape Town to play for UCT (Ikeys), captaining the Ikeys team in the Western Province Super League from 2005 until 2007. After suffering a bad leg break, he retired from playing rugby and set his sights on coaching.

== Coaching ==
Foote was an assistant coach at Ikeys from 2008 to 2010. He was promoted to head coach in 2011, guiding Ikeys to their first Varsity Cup title. Foote moved to Australia as a defensive consultant to the Western Force in 2013, and joined the Force full-time as the backs coach for the 2014 Super Rugby season. He was appointed, alongside David Wessels, as co-head coach of the Perth Spirit for the inaugural season of Australia's National Rugby Championship in 2014. After a two season gap, Foote returned to the head coach role for Perth Spirit in 2017.

In May 2021, Foote was named interim head coach of the Melbourne Rebels after the departure of David Wessels. In 2024, Kevin was appointed as the new South Africa U20 head coach.

Under Foote, the South Africa U20 side won the 2025 World Rugby U20 Championship in Italy, defeating New Zealand 23–15 in the final on 20 July 2025. In 2026, the team won the U20 Rugby Championship for the first time, clinching the Southern Hemisphere title with a game to spare after a 56–17 win over Australia in Gqeberha on 3 May 2026. They then retained their world crown at the 2026 World Rugby U20 Championship in Georgia, beating France 16–5 in the final on 19 July 2026 to become the first South African under-20 side to successfully defend the title.

== Honours ==
As head coach World Rugby U20 Championship: 2025, 2026 U20 Rugby Championship: 2026
