= Ivan Henjak =

Croatian rugby league coach and former rugby league footballer

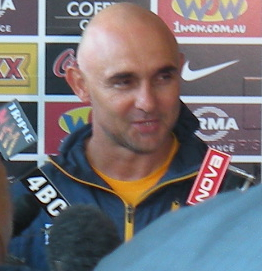

Personal information
- Born: 9 March 1963 (age 63) Croatia, Yugoslavia

Playing information
- Position: Halfback, Five-eighth, Centre
Club
| Years | Team | Pld | T | G | FG | P |
|---|---|---|---|---|---|---|
| 1981–83 | St. George Dragons | 23 | 4 | 0 | 0 | 16 |
| 1984–89 | Canberra Raiders | 118 | 29 | 0 | 0 | 116 |
| 1990–91 | Western Suburbs | 33 | 4 | 0 | 0 | 16 |
| 1992 | St. George Dragons | 11 | 0 | 0 | 0 | 0 |
| 1992–93 | Hull FC | 22 | 2 | 0 | 0 | 8 |
| | Total | 207 | 39 | 0 | 0 | 156 |
Representative
| Years | Team | Pld | T | G | FG | P |
| 1989–90 | Country NSW | 2 | 1 | 0 | 0 | 4 |

Coaching information
Club
| Years | Team | Gms | W | D | L | W% |
| 2009–10 | Brisbane Broncos | 51 | 27 | 0 | 24 | 53 |
- Source: As of 25 May 2021

Ivan Henjak (/hɛndʒæk/) (born 9 March 1963) is an Australian former professional rugby league footballer and coach. A New South Wales Country representative half back, Henjak played his club football in the NSWRL premiership, with the St. George Dragons, Canberra Raiders, and Western Suburbs Magpies, and later in England with Hull FC.

He later became head coach for the Brisbane Broncos of the National Rugby League, the second ever, having taken over from Wayne Bennett in 2009. Henjak is also the uncle of Australia international rugby union player, Matt Henjak, while Henjak's son played front row for Australian Schoolboys.

== Playing career ==
In 1987 Henjak, while playing for Canberra, was involved in a publicised dispute over an agreement he made to negotiate playing for Newcastle, despite having signed a contract to stay with the Raiders. That year he played at halfback in the Raiders' first grand final, which they lost to Manly.

In 1990, he moved to the Western Suburbs Magpies, being appointed captain. A former student at St Gregory's College, Campbelltown, he had supported the Magpies, later saying, "I followed Tommy. I was a Wests boy." He played 22 games that season, mostly at halfback with Jason Taylor playing five-eighth. With the arrival of new coach Warren Ryan in 1991, he was limited to 11 appearances, sometimes from the bench.

Henjak then moved to St. George for 1992 when they lost the grand final against the Brisbane Broncos, but he did not play that day. This was followed by a final season playing football in England in 1993.

Ivan Henjak played stand-off (replaced by substitute Keith Mumby) in Bradford Northern's 20–14 victory over Featherstone Rovers in the 1989 Yorkshire Cup Final during the 1989–90 season at Headingley, Leeds on Sunday 5 November 1989.

== Coaching career ==
Henjak became the Brisbane Broncos' reserve grade coach in 1994. He was later promoted to assistant coach under Wayne Bennett. Henjak was vocal about the alcohol culture of young players and their clubs after his nephew Matt Henjak and teammate Haig Sare were involved a drunken pub brawl which left Sare with a broken jaw.

Henjak was interviewed for the position of head coach at the Broncos in 2009 following Bennett's departure and was selected to take over the coaching reins for the 2009 season after Wayne Bennett left to head up St. George Illawarra Dragons.

Henjak's coaching career began well, with wins in all of his first three matches until the Broncos played against Wayne Bennett's Dragons in round four and lost. At round 7, his team had won all but one of their matches and were at the top of the ladder, having won 86% of their matches so far that season. But in a rollercoaster of a season for the new coach, Brisbane spent rounds 16 to 22 outside the top eight. Another turnaround in form saw the Broncos come within one match of the grand final in what was Henjak's début season.

Henjak could not take the Broncos to the 2010 finals, in which the six-time premiers failed to make the finals for the first time in almost two decades. Despite a late season, 10–6 win over eventual premiers St. George Illawarra at home, losses to the Sydney Roosters, Newcastle Knights (both twice), Parramatta Eels, New Zealand Warriors and the Canberra Raiders all proved costly.

On Monday 21 February 2011, it was announced by the Brisbane Broncos that Ivan Henjak had been sacked as head coach, and that his assistant coach Anthony Griffin would be taking over the reins of the club.

In 2014, Henjak was coach of the Sunshine Coast Falcons in the Queensland Cup, but quit the job after just ten games in charge amidst speculation he would be replaced.
