= Tony Falkenstein (entrepreneur) =

New Zealand entrepreneur and philanthropist

Tony Falkenstein CNZM
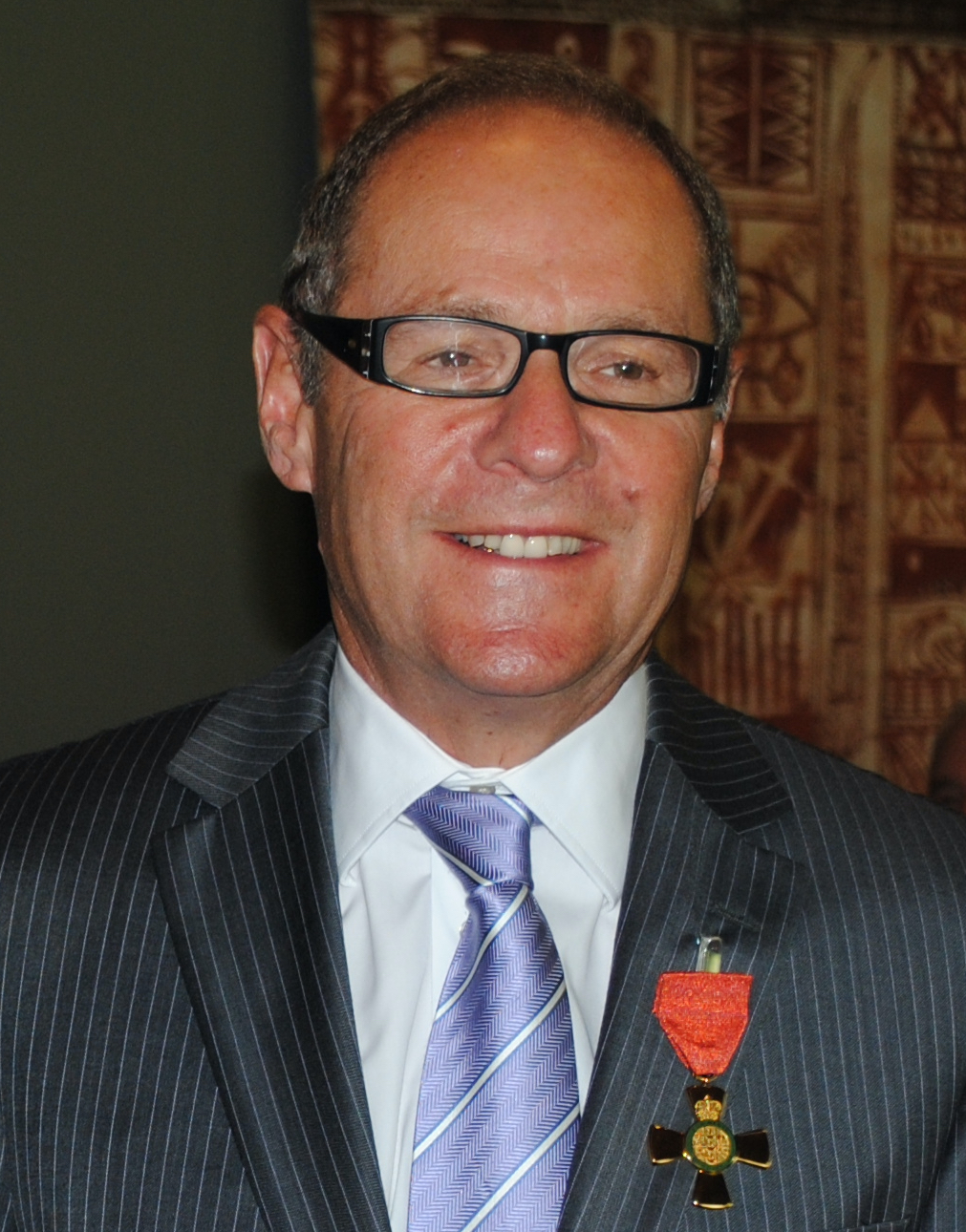
- Falkenstein in 2010
- Born: Anthony Edwin Falkenstein
- Occupations: Entrepreneur; author; philanthropist
- Website: justlifegroup.co.nz

Anthony Edwin Falkenstein CNZM is a New Zealand-based entrepreneur, author, and philanthropist. He is the founder and CEO of the publicly listed Just Life Group. Falkenstein is a Kea World Class New Zealand award winner, and an inductee of the New Zealand Business Hall of Fame. He is on the board of directors for Pure SEO, About Health, and Melambra Gold.

== Early life and education ==
Falkenstein completed his high school education at Onehunga High School in 1965. Soon after that, he enrolled at the University of Auckland to pursue a Bachelor of Commerce degree majoring in marketing and accounting.

== Career ==
Falkenstein started his career in 1972 as an administration manager for the Madison Square Gardens Corporation, where he worked for two years. In 1974, Falkenstein became the general manager of Polaroid Corporation, where he worked for seven years, and then joined OHL Corporation in a similar position, where he worked for four years.

In 1987, Falkenstein founded Just Life Group Limited with the aim to offer drinking water and water-related services across New Zealand. He is the CEO, along with being the director of Pure SEO and Melambra Gold, shares of which he acquired in 2014.

Falkenstein is also an Officer of the New Zealand Order of Merit (ONZM) and a member of the New Zealand Asian Leaders Organization and YPO. He has been a member of the Beta Gamma Sigma Society since 2012 and was the first New Zealander to be inducted into the international society.

Falkenstein has appeared and been featured in media outlets including TVNZ's There's No Silver Bullet, National Business Review, the New Zealand Herald, Stuff, Radio New Zealand, the Collective 54 Event, RobettLIVE, Better Business, the EO Entrepreneurs Organisation Podcast for APAC, the GroundBreaking Podcast, Talking Business, NBR Radio, and others.

== Books ==
Falkenstein is the author of The ABC's of Business: Never Hire a Person Who Walks Slowly, which was published in 2015 by Advantage Media Group.

== Awards and recognition ==
In 2008, Falkenstein was inducted into the New Zealand Business Hall of Fame.

In the 2010 New Year Honours, Falkenstein was appointed an Officer of the New Zealand Order of Merit, for services to business. He received the World Class New Zealand award for New Thinking in 2012 and also was listed as a Distinguished Alumni of the University of Auckland a year later. In 2014, he was honoured with the Alpha, Beta Gamma distinction.

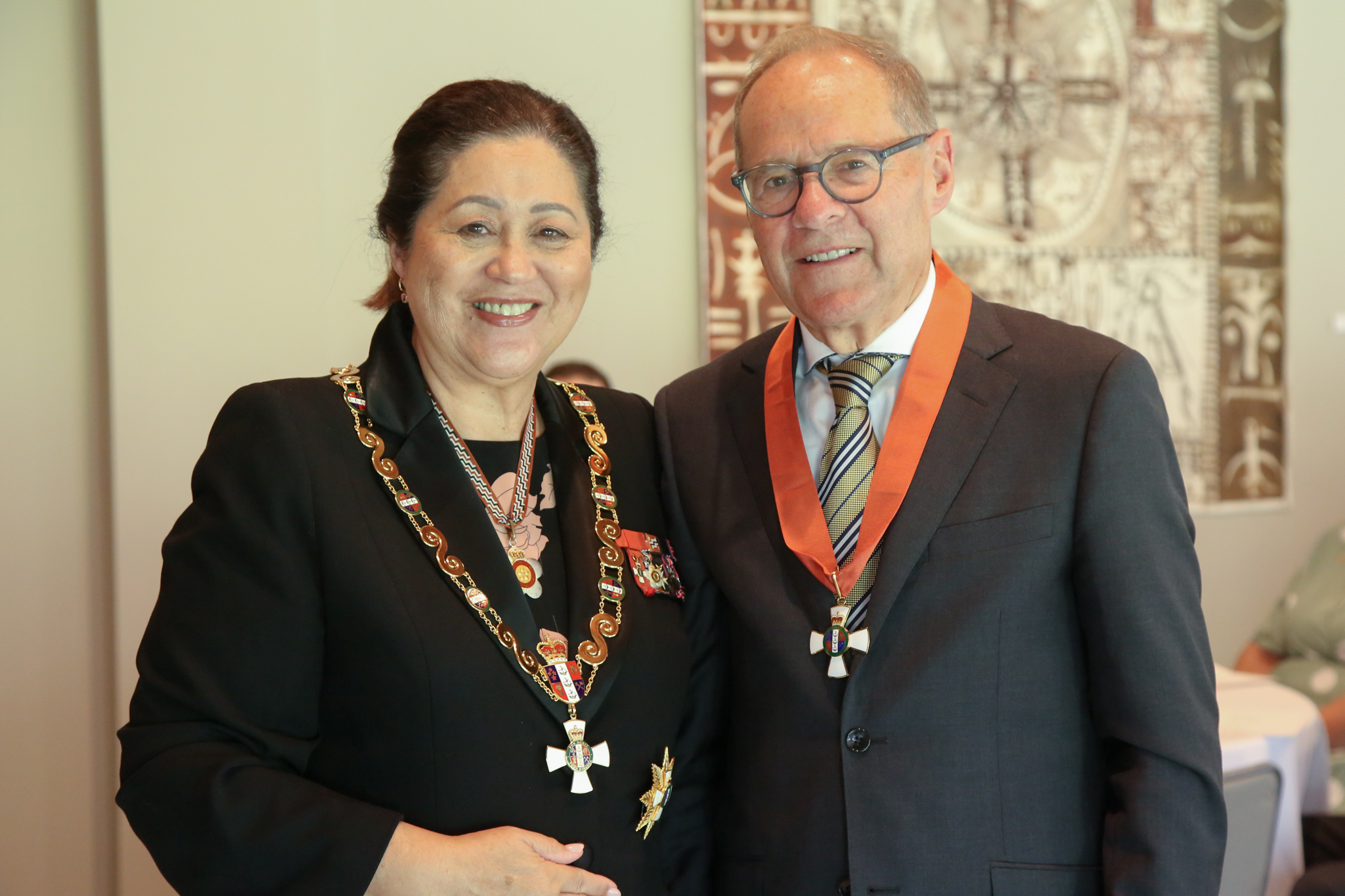
Falkenstein (right), after his investiture as a Companion of the New Zealand Order of Merit by the governor-general, Dame Cindy Kiro, at Government House, Auckland, on 15 April 2026

In the 2025 King’s Birthday Honours, Falkenstein was promoted to Companion of the New Zealand Order of Merit, for services to philanthropy and business education.

== Philanthropy ==
Falkenstein is an avid philanthropist and has been reported to have donated to various causes which including:

- $1 million to the Owen Glenn building for University of Auckland
- $600,000 to the University of Auckland Business School to fund up to 14 top students to travel to Silicon Valley
- $500,000 to support the University of Waikato's
- $3 million to Business Educators - The University of Auckland Business School, the Unitec School of Management and Entrepreneurship, and Onehunga High Business School
