= Albion Excelsior Rugby Club =

- Full name: Albion Excelsior Rugby Football Club
- Founded: 1899
- Ground(s): Gore Showgrounds, Gore
Team kit

Albion Excelsior Rugby Club is an amateur rugby club from Gore in the Southland Region of New Zealand. They are affiliated with Rugby Southland.
