= Dayna Edwards =

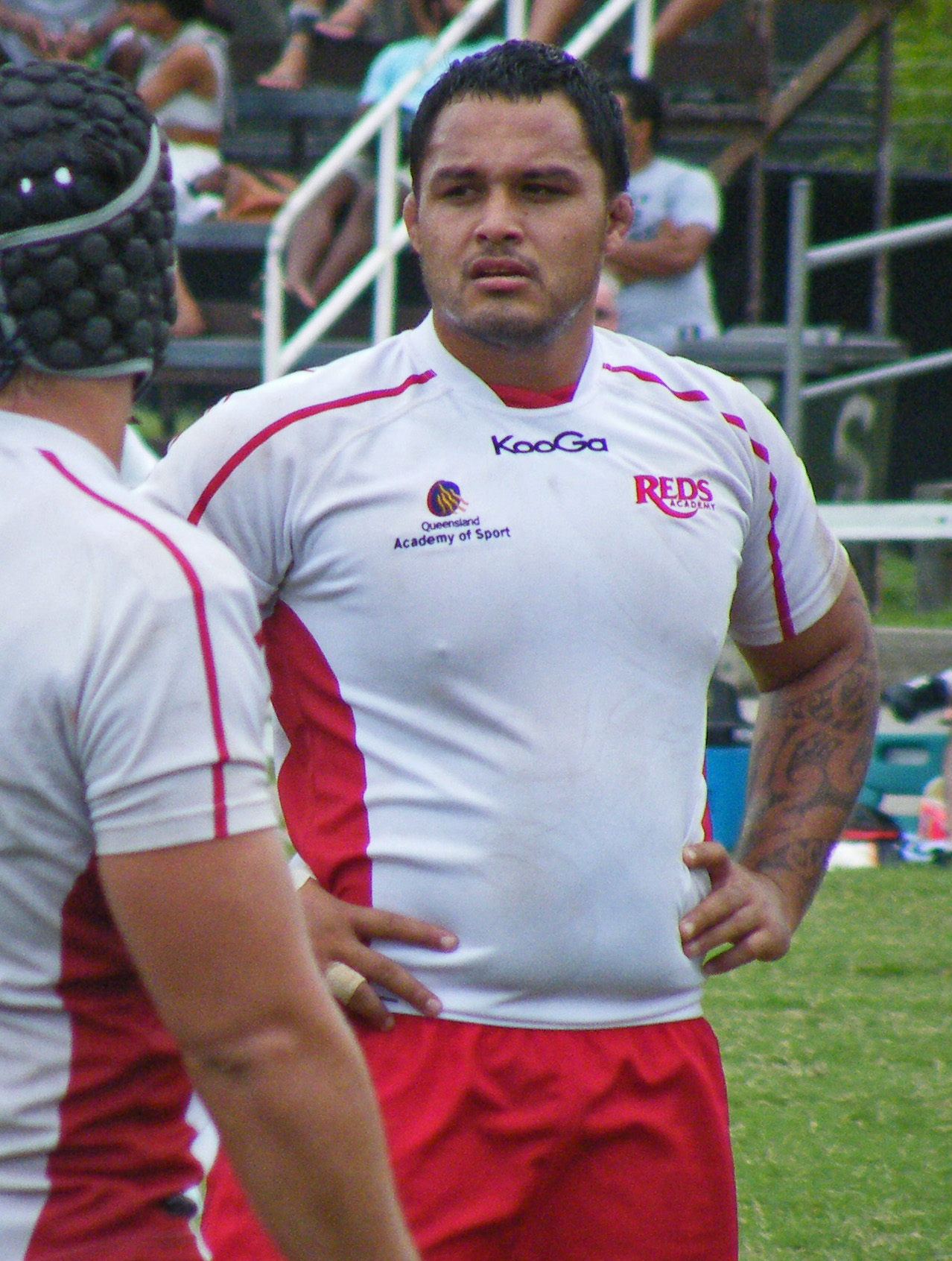
- Edwards while playing for Queensland
- Born: 14 March 1985 (age 41) Whanganui, New Zealand
- Height: 1.84 m (6 ft 1/2 in)
- Weight: 120 kg (18 st 13 lb)
- School: Church College of New Zealand

Rugby union career
- Position: Prop
- Current team: FC Grenoble
Senior career
Years	Team	Apps	(Points)
2010-18	FC Grenoble	189	(5)
- Correct as of 28 December 2019
Super Rugby
Years	Team	Apps	(Points)
2007-09	Queensland Reds	15	(0)
- Correct as of 28 December 2019

Dayna Edwards (born 14 March 1985) is a New Zealand-born Australian rugby union player. His position of choice is prop and he currently plays for FC Grenoble in the Pro D2. He previously played for the Queensland Reds in Super Rugby between 2007 and 2009.
