= Tom Hockings =

Australian rugby union player

- Born: 22 February 1986 (age 40) Bowen, QLD, Australia
- Height: 199 cm (6 ft 6 in)
- Weight: 112 kg (247 lb)
- Notable relative: Harry Hockings (brother)
- Occupation: Engineer

Rugby union career
- Position: Lock
Super Rugby
Years	Team	Apps	(Points)
2008–11	Force	41	(10)

Tom Hockings (born 22 February 1986) is an Australian former professional rugby union player.

== Biography ==
Hockings comes from Proserpine, a town in Queensland's Whitsunday Region, and is the elder brother of Reds player Harry Hockings. He joined the RugbyWA academy in 2006.

A lock, Hockings debuted for the Force in the opening round of the 2008 Super 14 season against the Sharks in Durban and had to assume responsibility for calling the line-outs when Nathan Sharpe withdrew with food poisoning. He was able to establish himself in the starting lineup during his first season, taking the position vacated by Rudi Vedelago, who had returned to Queensland. Post season shoulder surgery ruled him out of their United Kingdom tour, before he successfully came back in 2009 and signed a new two-year deal. He continued with the Force until 2011, then had two seasons at Kintetsu Liners, a Japanese club based in Osaka.
