= Junior Pelesasa =

Australian rugby union player (born 1980)

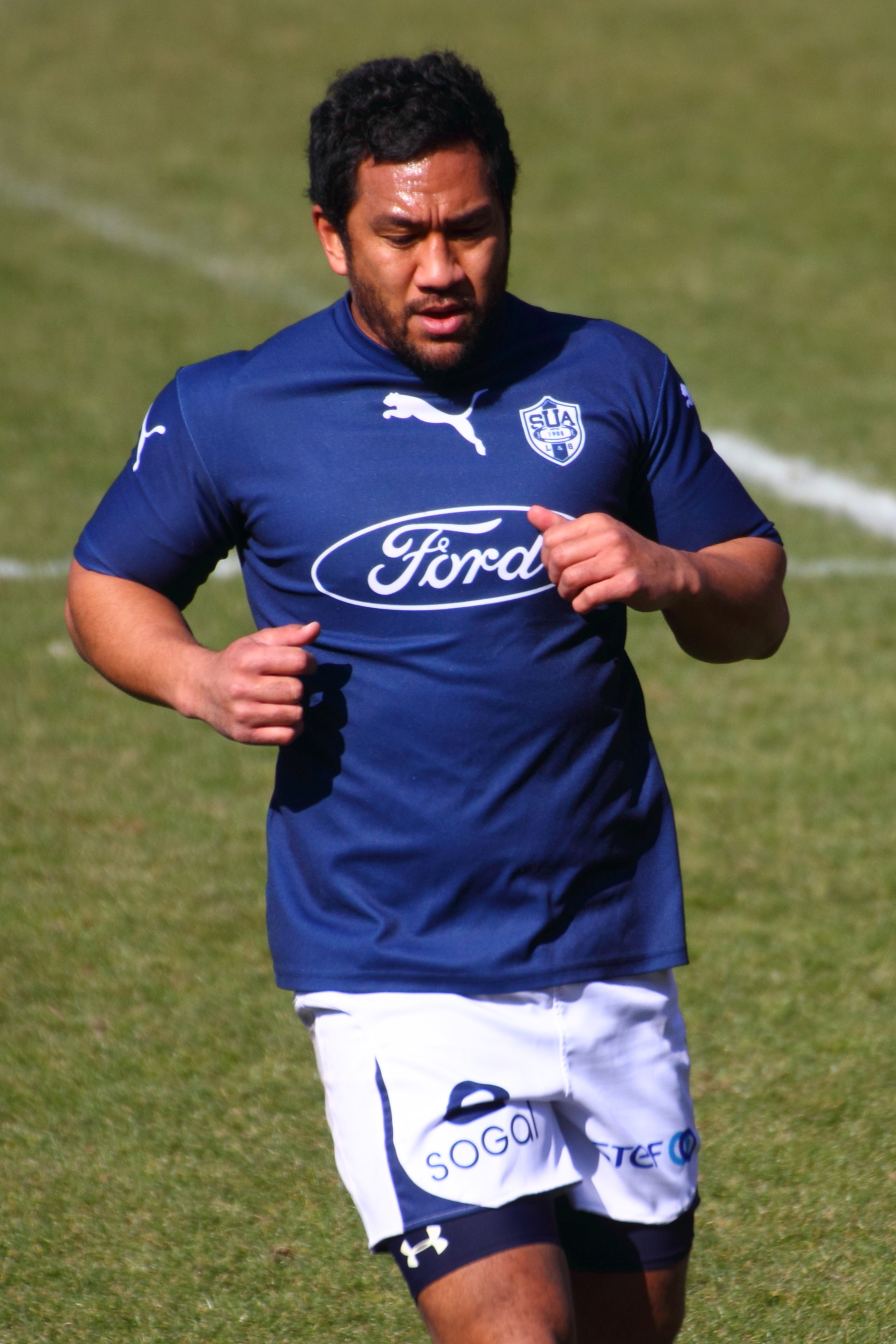
- Pelesasa in 2012
- Born: Junior Pelesasa; 17 October 1980 (age 46) Dunedin, Otago, New Zealand
- Height: 180 cm (5 ft 11 in)
- Weight: 94 kg (14 st 11 lb)
- School: Onehunga High School Nudgee College

Rugby union career
- Position: Centre
- Current team: Agen
Senior career
Years	Team	Apps	(Points)
- Brisbane Broncos
Provincial / State sides
Years	Team	Apps	(Points)
- Perth Spirit
-	Wanneroo		
Super Rugby
Years	Team	Apps	(Points)
1999 - __	Queensland Reds	33	(33)
2006 -	Western Force	17	(17)
International career
Years	Team	Apps	(Points)
2005 -	Australia A		

Junior Pelesasa (born 17 October 1980 in New Zealand) is an Australian rugby union footballer who currently plays for Agen. He plays as a centre.

== Career ==
Pelesasa moved to Australia from New Zealand at the age of 16. He has represented Australia Schoolboys, Australia Under 21s and Australia A. He spent two years playing for the Brisbane Broncos rugby league team after which he left Rugby league and joined Rugby Union playing for the Queensland provincial side before being drafted into the Queensland Reds Super 12 side where he played 33 matches for them. In 2006 he moved to a new Super Rugby franchise known as the Western Force. He played 5 matches for his new team during the 2006 season in which they finished last in the 2006 Super 14 competition.
