= Luke Doherty =

- Born: 2 February 1982 (age 44)
- Height: 195 cm (6 ft 5 in)
- Weight: 105 kg (231 lb)
- School: Iona College Brisbane

Rugby union career
- Position: Flanker
Super Rugby
Years	Team	Apps	(Points)
2003–05	Reds	20	(0)
2006–07	Western Force	24	(0)
2009	Waratahs	8	(0)

Luke Doherty (born 2 February 1982) is an Australian former professional rugby union player.

== Biography ==
Doherty was educated at Iona College in Brisbane.

A flanker, Doherty represented Australian Schoolboys, Australia under 19s and Australia under 21s, then competed for the Queensland Reds from 2003 to 2005. He made his rugby sevens debut for Australia in 2005 and also won Australia "A" selection that year. Signed by the Western Force, Doherty didn't miss a game in the Perth team's inaugural season in 2006 and spent one more year with the side before heading off to Italy to play with Rugby Calvisano in 2007–08. He played at Japanese club Kyuden Voltex from 2008–2011 Top League, before signing for one season with the NSW Waratahs.
