= Scott Daruda =

Australian rugby union player

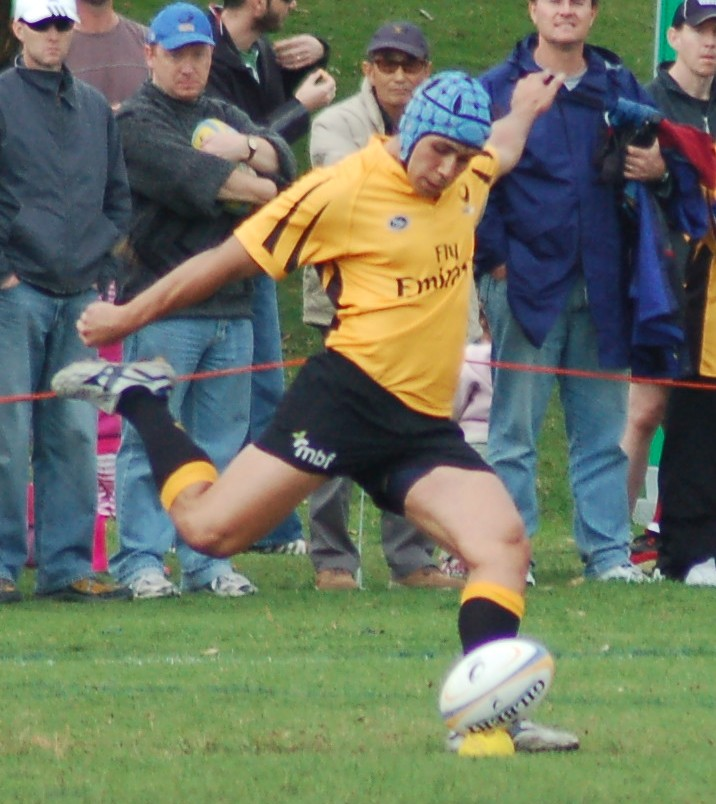
- Born: Scott L. Daruda; 17 February 1986 (age 40) Arawa, Papua New Guinea
- Height: 1.84 m (6 ft 0 in)
- Weight: 95 kg (14 st 13 lb)
- School: St. Joseph's Nudgee College

Rugby union career
- Position: Fly-half / Centre
- Current team: Manly Marlins
Provincial / State sides
Years	Team	Apps	(Points)
- Brothers
-	Perth Spirit		
-	Associates		
Super Rugby
Years	Team	Apps	(Points)
	Queensland Reds	1	(0)
2006–	Western Force	13	(5)
International career
Years	Team	Apps	(Points)
2005–	Australia A		

Scott Daruda (born 17 February 1986) is an Australian rugby union player. After playing for Manly RUFC he shift North debuting for Bond University. His usual position is either at fly-half or in the centres.

== Career ==
He was born in Arawa, Papua New Guinea. He went on to play for a number of Australian representative sides, such as the under-19s national side in 2004 and the under-21s in 2005. He also played in the Australian Commonwealth Youth Games Sevens.

Scott attended St. Joseph's Nudgee College from 1999–2003. He was a member of Riley House for four of those years, before becoming a pioneer student of Shaw House in its inaugural year. Scott Daruda played for the well-known Nudgee College First XV in 2002 and 2003, and captained the team in his senior year. The 2003 season is considered by many to be one of the toughest seasons on record, with some of the students involved in the competition including Lloyd Johansson, and Karmichael Hunt of the Queensland Reds and Brisbane Broncos respectively.

He signed for the Queensland Reds and made his debut during the 2005 Super 12 season. He then captained the under-19 national Australian side at the World Championships. He then signed for expansion franchise the Western Force.

More recently he has played for Agen in France and from the 2010–12 seasons in Japan for Kubota Spears.

In the 2012 season he is currently playing for the Manly Marlins, a Sydney team playing in the Shute Shield rugby competition.
