= Ryan Tyrrell =

- Born: 9 November 1983 (age 43) Kelmscott, WA, Australia
- Height: 183 cm (6 ft 0 in)
- Weight: 114 kg (251 lb)

Rugby union career
- Position: Hooker
Senior career
Years	Team	Apps	(Points)
2011–12	Cardiff Blues	15	(0)
Super Rugby
Years	Team	Apps	(Points)
2010	Force	3	(0)

Ryan Tyrrell (born 9 November 1983) is an Australian former professional rugby union player.

A front-rower from Perth, Tyrrell became the first home-grown product to make the Western Force run-on side in the 2010 Super 14 season, having been developed by the Rockingham club. He made three Super 14 appearances that season before succumbing to a neck injury. After undergoing surgery, Tyrrell attempted a return in the 2011 pre-season but continued to have issues with his neck and announced his retirement.

Tyrrell made a comeback to professional rugby in 2011, signed by the Cardiff Blues as injury cover, with hookers Gareth Williams and T. Rhys Thomas not available. He was due to return to Super Rugby in 2013 after joining the Melbourne Rebels, but had to go back home to Perth for personal reasons.
