= Matt Henjak =

Australia international rugby union player

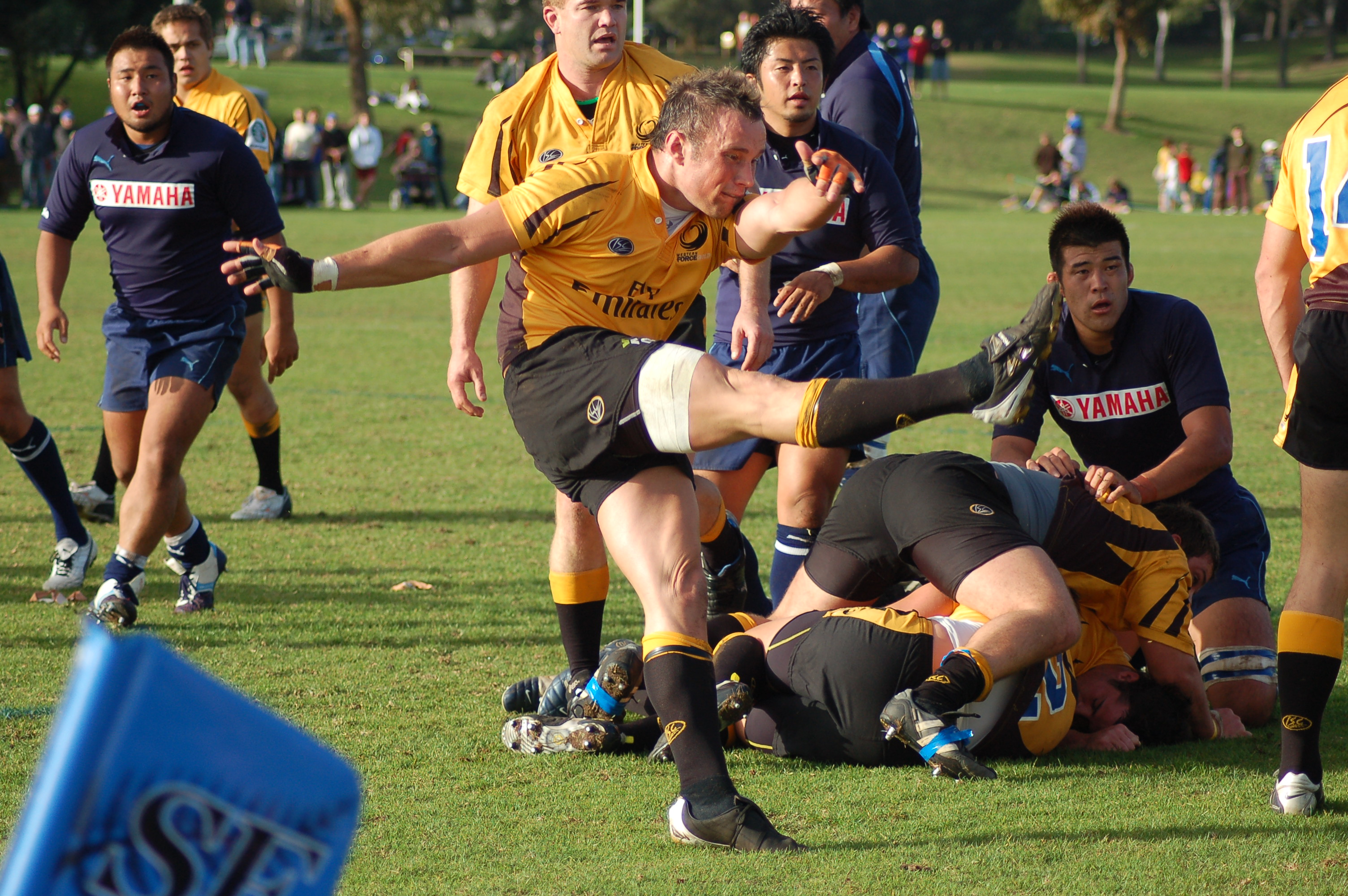
- Born: Matthew T. Henjak; 25 November 1981 (age 44) Queanbeyan, New South Wales, Australia
- Height: 1.81 m (5 ft 11 in)
- Weight: 88 kg (13 st 12 lb)
- School: St Edmund's College
- Notable relative: Ivan Henjak (uncle)

Rugby union career
- Position: Scrum-half
Amateur team(s)
Years	Team	Apps	(Points)
2002	Canberra Vikings (QPR)	9	(40)
2006–2008	Cottesloe		
Senior career
Years	Team	Apps	(Points)
2003–2005	Brumbies	18	(5)
2004	Harlequins	2	(0)
2006–2008	Western Force	23	(5)
2007	Perth Spirit		
2008–2012	Toulon	72	(16)
2012–2013	Dax	21	(5)
International career
Years	Team	Apps	(Points)
2004–2006	Australia	4	(0)

Matt Henjak (born 25 November 1981) is an Australian former professional rugby union player. He played scrum-half for the Australian national team. Henjak, of Croatian ancestry, is the nephew of former rugby league half-back and former Brisbane Broncos head coach Ivan Henjak. After being sacked by the Western Force in 2008 for an off field indiscretion, Henjak signed for Toulon in the Top 14 in France where he played until 2012. He played a further season in France with Dax in the Pro D2 competition.

== Early career ==
Henjak was educated at St Edmund's College in Canberra, the same school as Matt Giteau, George Gregan and Ricky Stuart. He played for the Canberra Vikings while playing in the Canberra club competition. In 2001 and 2002 Henjak represented Australia in the under 21 side as well as later playing for Australia A.

== Super Rugby ==
He made his Super 12 debut in 2003, playing for the ACT Brumbies in a match against the Chiefs.

Henjak was called up into the 27-man national squad as cover mid-year 2004 after Elton Flatley broke his arm. Henjak made his international debut in 2004, on 26 June against England where he came off the bench onto the wing with 10 minutes remaining in the game after Clyde Rathbone was injured.

He moved to the new Super 14 team, the Western Force, for the 2006 Super 14 season. In 2008 he was involved in an altercation in which his teammate winger Haig Sare had his jaw broken, requiring surgery to insert a plate. Henjak was dismissed by the Western Force after he was found guilty of involvement in a bar room brawl.

== England and France ==
Henjak went over to England for the latter part of 2004, having a short term stint with Harlequins.

After being sacked from the Western Force in 2008, Henjak was linked to a code-switch to rugby league and a move to the Canberra Raiders, however Toulon gave him the chance to resurrect his rugby union career in France. After four seasons with Toulon in the Top 14 competition, he played a further season with Pro D2 Club, Dax, in the second tier professional competition before retiring from professional rugby.

== Controversies ==
During his playing career, Henjak was linked with a series of scandals. In 2004, he was involved in an altercation in South Africa, in which the complainant was secretly paid A$16,000 to drop assault charges.
