= Troy Takiari =

- Full name: Troy James Takiari
- Born: 25 November 1978 (age 47) Auckland, New Zealand
- Height: 6 ft 2 in (188 cm)
- Weight: 261 lb (118 kg)

Rugby union career
- Position: Prop
Senior career
Years	Team	Apps	(Points)
2009–11	FC Grenoble	26	(0)
Super Rugby
Years	Team	Apps	(Points)
2005-06	Waratahs	2	(0)
2006–09	Force	28	(0)

Troy James Takiari (born 25 November 1978) is an Australian former professional rugby union player.

Born in Auckland, Takiari is the son of NZ Combined Services player Mohi Takiari, who was involved with the ACT team (Now Brumbies) in Canberra rugby during the late 1980s. He played his early rugby in Canberra for his father's club Wests and was a member of the Brumbies Academy. A 6 ft 3 in prop, Takiari had stints with Scottish club Hawick in 2001/2003, playing beside his brother Tyson.

Takiari signed with the New South Wales Waratahs in 2005 and made two appearances in the 2006 Super 14 season, then continued his career in Perth at the Western Force. He was part of three Super 14 campaigns with the Force and earned Australia "A" representative honours at the 2007 Pacific Nations Cup, as well as making the extended Wallaby squad under John Connolly the same year. Before leaving professional rugby, Takiari had a stint playing in France with FC Grenoble during their 2009–10 Rugby Pro D2 campaign.
