= Rudi Vedelago =

- Born: Rudi Patrick Vedelago; 31 December 1980 (age 45) Brisbane
- Height: 6 ft 6 in (1.98 m)
- Weight: 240 lb (110 kg)

Rugby union career
- Position: Lock
Super Rugby
Years	Team	Apps	(Points)
- Reds
–	Western Force		
International career
Years	Team	Apps	(Points)
- Australia u-19
–	Australia u-21		
–	Australia A		

Rudi Patrick Vedelago (born 31 December 1980) is an Australian former rugby union player.

== Biography ==
Born and raised in Brisbane, Rudi attended school at St. Joseph's College, Gregory Terrace between 1993 and 1997.

== Playing career ==
After leaving school he played for the University of Queensland.

Rudi represented Australia at schoolboy, U/19, U/21, and Australia A level, but beyond this level his career was interrupted by a string of injuries.

Vedelago played for the Queensland Reds and the Western Force in Super Rugby, retiring from professional rugby in 2007.
