= 2019 Global Rapid Rugby season =

2019 Rapid Rugby Showcase
- League: Global Rapid Rugby
- Sport: Rugby
- Duration: 22 March – 9 August
- Matches: 14
- Teams: 7

Asia Showcase Series
- Winner: Western Force

Pacific Showcase Series
- Winner: Western Force

Seasons
- ← 2018 2020 →

The 2019 Global Rapid Rugby season was a showcase series for seven rugby union teams played in locations across the Asia-Pacific region. Global Rapid Rugby originally planned a full home and away tournament followed by finals, with eight teams competing in 2019. The competition launch was postponed by a year, however, due to the short time frame following World Rugby approval in November 2018. A scaled-down showcase series of fourteen matches was arranged instead.

== Teams ==
Seven teams played in the Rapid Rugby Showcase in 2019:

Team	Head coach	Captain	Stadium	Capacity
(Singapore) Asia Pacific Dragons	Ryan Martin	Stacey Ili	Queenstown Stadium	3,800
(Fiji) Fijian Latui	Senirusi Seruvakula	Mosese Voka	Churchill Park	9,500
Kagifa Samoa	Darryl Suasua	Leon Fukofuka	Pukekohe Stadium (Note: Due to construction being underway at Apia Park for the Pacific Games, Samoa's home matches were moved to Auckland and Brisbane.)	12,000
Kagifa Samoa	Darryl Suasua	Leon Fukofuka	Ballymore	18,000
(Hong Kong) South China Tigers	Craig Hammond	James Cunningham; Liam Slatem	Aberdeen Stadium	9,000
Valke Malaysia	JP Immelman	Shane Kirkwood	HBF Park	20,500
(Australia) Western Force	Tim Sampson	Ian Prior	HBF Park	20,500
(Note: Invitational team run by the promoter behind the Barbarians and selected from established internationals and rising players.) World XV	Robbie Deans	Andy Ellis	HBF Park	20,500

== Standings ==
A modified version of the standard Rugby union bonus points system was used, with bonus points awarded for:

- a team scoring 4 or more tries in a game;
- a winning team scoring at least 3 tries more than their opponent;
- a losing team defeated by a margin of 5 points or under.

Four points were awarded for a win and none for a loss; two points were awarded to each team for a match ending in a draw.

Global Rapid Rugby – Asian Showcase
#	Team	P	W	D	L	PD	TF	TA	TB	LB	Pts
1	(Australia) Western Force	4	4	0	0	+83	19	5	6	0	22
2	(Hong Kong) South China Tigers	4	1	0	3	−52	12	21	2	0	6
3	(Singapore) Asia Pacific Dragons	4	1	0	3	−31	10	15	1	1	6
Updated: 12 May 2019; Source: rapidrugby.com (archived)

Global Rapid Rugby – Pacific Showcase
#	Team	P	W	D	L	PD	TF	TA	TB	LB	Pts
1	(Australia) Western Force	4	4	0	0	+109	25	11	5	0	21
2	(Fiji) Fijian Latui	4	2	0	2	−21	17	19	2	0	10
3	Kagifa Samoa	4	0	0	4	−88	14	26	1	2	3
Updated: 21 June 2019; Source: rapidrugby.com (archived)

== Showcase Series ==
=== Showcase opener ===
22 March	Western Force	26–16	World XV	HBF Park, Perth
7.40 pm AWST (UTC+8)	Try: McGregor 15'; Lacey 29'; Deegan 41'; Brache 53'; Con: Prior (2/3) 16' 41'; Deegan (1/1) 54'	Report	Try: Oakman-Hunt 7'; Finau 33' pwt Con: Ono (1/1) 8'	Attendance: 11,368; Referee: Graham Cooper (Australia)

Team details

FB	15	(Australia) Jack McGregor
WG	14	(Australia) Clay Uyen
OC	13	(United States) Marcel Brache^{+}
IC	12	(Samoa) Henry Taefu^{+}
WG	11	(Australia) Brad Lacey
FH	10	(Australia) Andrew Deegan
SH	9	(Australia) Ian Prior (c)
N8	8	(South Africa) Brynard Stander
OF	7	(Australia) Chris Alcock
BF	6	(Samoa) Henry Stowers
LK	5	(New Zealand) Jeremy Thrush^{+}
LK	4	(New Zealand) Johan Bardoul
TP	3	(Australia) Kieran Longbottom
HK	2	(Australia) Feleti Kaitu'u
LP	1	(Australia) Cameron Orr
Replacements:
HK	16	(Australia) Andrew Ready
LP	17	(Australia) Harrison Lloyd
TP	18	(South Africa) Chris Heiberg
FL	19	(Australia) Leon Power
FL	20	(Australia) Tevin Ferris
SH	21	(Australia) Issak Fines
CE	22	(Samoa) AJ Alatimu
OB	23	(Australia) Nick Jooste
OB	24	(Fiji) Masivesi Dakuwaqa
Coach:
(Australia) Tim Sampson

FB	15	(South Africa) Gio Aplon^{+}
WG	14	(New Zealand) Jamie Spowart
OC	13	(Australia) Dylan Riley
IC	12	(New Zealand) Inga Finau
WG	11	(Australia) Digby Ioane^{+}
FH	10	(Japan) Kosei Ono^{+}
SH	9	(New Zealand) Andy Ellis^{+} (c)
N8	8	(Argentina) Leonardo Senatore^{+}
OF	7	(New Zealand) Hugh Renton
BF	6	(Australia) Michael Oakman-Hunt
LK	5	(New Zealand) Hamish Dalzell
LK	4	(Australia) Jack Cornelsen
TP	3	(Japan) Shohei Hirano
HK	2	(New Zealand) Greg Pleasants-Tate
LP	1	(Australia) Tom Moloney
Replacements:
HK	16	(New Zealand) Corey Flynn^{+}
LP	17	(New Zealand) Wyatt Crockett^{+}
TP	18	(New Zealand) Chris King
FL	19	(New Zealand) Mike Curry
FL	20	(Japan) Shota Fukui
SH	21	(Tonga) Leon Fukofuka^{+}
CE	22	(Australia) Nick Cummins^{+}
OB	23	(Japan) Yoshikazu Fujita^{+}
OB	24	(Japan) Kazuki Ishida
Coach:
(New Zealand) Robbie Deans^{+}

Notes:
^{+} denotes internationally capped

=== Asia Showcase ===
==== Asia Rd 1 ====
29 March	Western Force	45–22	South China Tigers	HBF Park, Perth
7.40 pm AWST (UTC+8)	Try: Power 5'; Dakuwaqa 9' pwt Deegan 18'; Longbottom 28'; McGregor 40'; Fines 65'; Con: Prior (4/4) 7' 16' 31' 42'; Alatimu (0/1); Pen: Alatimu (1/1) 61'; Cards: Dakuwaqa (YC) 12'; Bardoul (YC) 53'	Report	Try: Hughes 8'; Penalty try 11'; Post 34'; Con: Hughes (1/2) 10'; Pen: Hughes (1/1) 3'	Attendance: 7,688; Referee: Aaron Pook (Australia)

Team details

FB	15	(Australia) Jack McGregor
WG	14	(Fiji) Masivesi Dakuwaqa
OC	13	(Samoa) Henry Taefu*
IC	12	(Samoa) Rodney Iona*
WG	11	(Australia) Clay Uyen
FH	10	(Australia) Andrew Deegan
SH	9	(Australia) Ian Prior (c)
N8	8	(South Africa) Brynard Stander
OF	7	(Australia) Chris Alcock
BF	6	(Samoa) Henry Stowers
LK	5	(New Zealand) Jeremy Thrush*
LK	4	(Australia) Leon Power
TP	3	(Australia) Kieran Longbottom
HK	2	(Australia) Andrew Ready
LP	1	(Australia) Harrison Lloyd
Replacements:
HK	16	(Australia) Feleti Kaitu'u
LP	17	(South Africa) Chris Heiberg
TP	18	(Australia) Tom Sheminant
FL	19	(New Zealand) Johan Bardoul
FL	20	(Australia) Tevin Ferris
SH	21	(Australia) Issak Fines
CE	22	(Samoa) AJ Alatimu*
OB	23	(United States) Marcel Brache*
Coach:
(Australia) Tim Sampson

FB	15	(New Zealand) Nathan De Theirry
WG	14	(England) Tom Varndell*
OC	13	(Hong Kong) Lewis Warner*
IC	12	(Hong Kong) Matthew Rosslee*
WG	11	(China) Ma Chong*
FH	10	(England) Glyn Hughes
SH	9	(Hong Kong) Bryn Phillips*
N8	8	(Hong Kong) Joshua Hrstich*
OF	7	(Hong Kong) Josh Dowsing
BF	6	(Hong Kong) James Cunningham* (c)
LK	5	(Ireland) Callum McCullough
LK	4	(Hong Kong) Fin Field*
TP	3	(Hong Kong) Grant Kemp*
HK	2	(Hong Kong) Alexander Post*
LP	1	(Hong Kong) Tau Koloamatangi
Replacements:
HK	16	(New Zealand) Mitch Andrews
LP	17	(Hong Kong) Callum McFeat Smith*
TP	18	(Hong Kong) Jack Parfitt*
FL	19	(Hong Kong) Michael Parfitt*
FL	20	(Wales) James Sawyer
SH	21	(South Africa) Ruan du Plooy
CE	22	(Australia) Tom Hill
OB	23	(Fiji) Samisoni Viriviri*
Coach:
(New Zealand) Craig Hammond

Notes:
* denotes internationally capped

==== Asia Rd 2 ====
12 April	Western Force	42–10	Asia Pacific Dragons	HBF Park, Perth
7.45 PM AWST (UTC+8)	Try: Bardoul 10'; Tizzano 21'; Taefu 45'; Stowers 52'; Kaitu'u 69'; Davies 75'; Con: Alatimu (6/6) 11', 22', 46', 53', 70', 75'	Report	Try: McKee 16'; Con: Hala (1/1) 17'; Pen: Hala (1/1) 8'	Attendance: 8,427; Referee: Tim Baker (Hong Kong)

Team details

FB	15	(Australia) Nick Jooste
WG	14	(Australia) Clay Uyen
OC	13	(United States) Marcel Brache*
IC	12	(Samoa) Henry Taefu*
WG	11	(Australia) Brad Lacey
FH	10	(Samoa) AJ Alatimu*
SH	9	(Australia) Issak Fines
N8	8	(South Africa) Brynard Stander
OF	7	(Australia) Carlo Tizzano
BF	6	(Samoa) Henry Stowers
LK	5	(Australia) Leon Power
LK	4	(New Zealand) Jeremy Thrush* (c)
TP	3	(Australia) Kieran Longbottom
HK	2	(Australia) Heath Tessmann
LP	1	(Australia) Harrison Lloyd
Replacements:
HK	16	(Australia) Feleti Kaitu'u
LP	17	(South Africa) Chris Heiberg
TP	18	(Australia) Tom Sheminant
FL	19	(New Zealand) Johan Bardoul
FL	20	(Australia) Tevin Ferris
SH	21	(Australia) Michael McDonald
CE	22	(Australia) Jack McGregor
OB	23	(Australia) Rod Davies*
Coach:
(Australia) Tim Sampson

FB	15	(Australia) Junior Laloifi
WG	14	(Fiji) Asaeli Tikoirotuma*
OC	13	(New Zealand) Stacy Ili (c)
IC	12	(Tonga) Latiume Fosita*
WG	11	(New Zealand) Mitchell Scott
FH	10	(Tonga) Kali Hala*
SH	9	(New Zealand) Kurt Hammer
N8	8	(Fiji) Naulia Dawai*
OF	7	(Tonga) Nili Latu*
BF	6	(New Zealand) Mike McKee
LK	5	(New Zealand) Joketani Koroi
LK	4	(South Africa) Louis Conradie
TP	3	(Fiji) Ropate Rinakama*
HK	2	(New Zealand) Sekonaia Pole
LP	1	(Tonga) Latu Talakai*
Replacements:
HK	16	(New Zealand) Michael Lea
LP	17	(Fiji) Taniela Koroi*
TP	18	(New Zealand) Ha'amea Ahio
FL	19	(Tonga) Irwin Finau
FL	20	(Singapore) Declan Martens*
SH	21	(Tonga) Leon Fukofuka*
OB	22	(Fiji) Sireli Bobo*
OB	23	(New Zealand) Zac Harrison-Jones
Coach:
(New Zealand) Ryan Martin

Notes:
* denotes internationally capped

==== Asia Rd 3 ====
21 April	South China Tigers	29–19	Asia Pacific Dragons	Aberdeen Stadium, HK
3.10 pm HKT (UTC+8)	Try: De Thierry 2'; Warner 12'; Viriviri 15'; Van der Smit 29'; Con: Hughes (3/4) 3', 13', 16'; Pen: Hughes (1/1) 47'; Cards: De Thierry (YC) 26'	Report	Try: Talakai 27'; Hala 65'; Rokua 70'; Con: Hala (2/3) 28', 66'	Attendance: 1,000+ Referee: Graham Cooper (Australia)

Team details

FB	15	(New Zealand) Nathan De Theirry
WG	14	(Fiji) Samisoni Viriviri*
OC	13	(Hong Kong) Lewis Warner*
IC	12	(Hong Kong) Matthew Rosslee*
WG	11	(England) Tom Varndell*
FH	10	(England) Glyn Hughes
SH	9	(Hong Kong) Liam Slatem* (c)
N8	8	(Namibia) Luke van der Smit
OF	7	(Hong Kong) Josh Dowsing*
BF	6	(Wales) James Sawyer
LK	5	(Hong Kong) Craig Lodge*
LK	4	(Hong Kong) Fin Field*
TP	3	(Hong Kong) Tau Koloamatangi*
HK	2	(Hong Kong) Alexander Post*
LP	1	(Hong Kong) Ben Higgins*
Replacements:
HK	16	(New Zealand) Mitch Andrews
LP	17	(Hong Kong) Adam Fullgrabe*
TP	18	(Hong Kong) Grant Kemp*
FL	19	(Hong Kong) Kyle Sullivan*
FL	20	(Hong Kong) James Cunningham*
SH	21	(Hong Kong) Jamie Lauder*
CE	22	(Australia) Tom Hill
OB	23	(China) Ma Chong*
Coach:
(New Zealand) Craig Hammond

FB	15	(Fiji) Asaeli Tikoirotuma*
WG	14	(Fiji) Sireli Bobo*
OC	13	(New Zealand) Stacy Ili (c)
IC	12	(Tonga) Latiume Fosita*
WG	11	(New Zealand) Mitchell Scott
FH	10	(Tonga) Kali Hala*
SH	9	(Tonga) Leon Fukofuka*
N8	8	(Tonga) Nili Latu*
OF	7	(Tonga) Fotu Lokotui*
BF	6	(Fiji) Naulia Dawai*
LK	5	(New Zealand) Joketani Koroi
LK	4	(South Africa) Louis Conradie
TP	3	(Fiji) Ropate Rinakama*
HK	2	(New Zealand) Michael Lea
LP	1	(Tonga) Latu Talakai*
Replacements:
HK	16	(New Zealand) Sekonaia Pole
LP	17	(Fiji) Taniela Koroi*
TP	18	(New Zealand) Ha'amea Ahio
FL	19	(New Zealand) Mike McKee
FL	20	(Singapore) Declan Martens*
SH	21	(South Africa) Rowan Gouws
OB	22	(Fiji) Naibuka Rokua
OB	23	(Australia) Junior Laloifi
Coach:
(New Zealand) Ryan Martin

Notes:
* denotes internationally capped

==== Asia Rd 4 ====
28 April	Asia Pacific Dragons	41–26	South China Tigers	Queenstown Stadium, SG
3.10 pm SGT (UTC+8)	Try: Gouws 4' Hala 12'; Ili 20' J. Koroi 23'; Penalty try 43'; Harrison 67'; Con: Hala (2/4) 5' 13'; Fosita (1/1) 68'; Pen: Fosita (1/1) 61'; Cards: Rinakama (YC) 27'; Tikoirotuma (YC) 52'	Report	Try: Hrstich 6'; Penalty try 27'; Solomona 46'; Neville 70+1'; Con: Hughes (2/3) 7' 47'	Attendance: 1,672; Referee: Richard Kelly (New Zealand)

Team details

FB	15	(Tonga) Kali Hala*
WG	14	(New Zealand) Zac Harrison-Jones
OC	13	(Fiji) Asaeli Tikoirotuma*
IC	12	(New Zealand) Stacy Ili (c)
WG	11	(Fiji) Sireli Bobo*
FH	10	(New Zealand) Mitchell Scott
SH	9	(South Africa) Rowan Gouws
N8	8	(Tonga) Nili Latu*
OF	7	(Tonga) Fotu Lokotui*
BF	6	(New Zealand) Mike McKee
LK	5	(New Zealand) Joketani Koroi
LK	4	(South Africa) Louis Conradie
TP	3	(Fiji) Ropate Rinakama*
HK	2	(New Zealand) Sekonaia Pole
LP	1	(New Zealand) Ha'amea Ahio
Replacements:
HK	16	(New Zealand) Michael Lea
LP	17	(Fiji) Taniela Koroi*
TP	18	(Tonga) Latu Talakai*
FL	19	(Fiji) Naulia Dawai*
FL	20	(Tonga) Irwin Finau*
SH	21	(Tonga) Latiume Fosita
OB	22	(New Zealand) Kurt Hammer
OB	23	(Australia) Junior Laloifi
Coach:
(New Zealand) Ryan Martin

FB	15	(New Zealand) Nathan De Theirry
WG	14	(Fiji) Samisoni Viriviri*
OC	13	(Hong Kong) Lewis Warner*
IC	12	(Hong Kong) Matthew Rosslee*
WG	11	(Hong Kong) Conor Hartley*
FH	10	(England) Glyn Hughes
SH	9	(Hong Kong) Liam Slatem* (c)
N8	8	(Hong Kong) Joshua Hrstich*
OF	7	(Hong Kong) Josh Dowsing*
BF	6	(Wales) James Sawyer
LK	5	(Hong Kong) Craig Lodge*
LK	4	(Hong Kong) Fin Field*
TP	3	(Hong Kong) Tau Koloamatangi*
HK	2	(Hong Kong) Dayne Jans*
LP	1	(Hong Kong) Ben Higgins*
Replacements:
HK	16	(Hong Kong) Alexander Post*
LP	17	(Hong Kong) Adam Fullgrabe*
TP	18	(Samoa) Faizal Solomona Penesa
FL	19	(Hong Kong) Kyle Sullivan*
FL	20	(Namibia) Luke van der Smit
SH	21	(Hong Kong) Bryn Phillips*
CE	22	(Hong Kong) Ben Axten-Burrett*
OB	23	(Hong Kong) Jack Neville*
Coach:
(New Zealand) Craig Hammond

Notes:
* denotes internationally capped

==== Asia Rd 5 ====
5 May	Asia Pacific Dragons	3–7	Western Force	Queenstown Stadium, SG
3.10 pm SGT (UTC+8)	Pen: Fosita (1) 27'; Cards: S. Ili (YC)	Report	Try: Tessmann 33'; Con: Prior (1/1) 34'	Attendance: 1,919; Referee: Matthew Rodden (Hong Kong)

Team details

FB	15	(Tonga) Kali Hala*
WG	14	(Australia) Junior Laloifi
OC	13	(Fiji) Asaeli Tikoirotuma*
IC	12	(New Zealand) Stacy Ili (c)
WG	10	(New Zealand) Mitchell Scott
FH	22	(Tonga) Leon Fukofuka*
SH	21	(Tonga) Latiume Fosita
N8	8	(Tonga) Nili Latu*
OF	7	(Tonga) Fotu Lokotui*
BF	6	(New Zealand) Mike McKee
LK	5	(New Zealand) Joketani Koroi
LK	4	(South Africa) Louis Conradie
TP	3	(Fiji) Ropate Rinakama*
HK	2	(New Zealand) Sekonaia Pole
LP	1	(New Zealand) Ha'amea Ahio
Replacements:
HK	16	(Tonga) Sosefo Sakalia*
LP	17	(Fiji) Taniela Koroi*
TP	18	(Tonga) Latu Talakai*
FL	19	(Fiji) Naulia Dawai*
FL	20	(Tonga) Irwin Finau*
SH	9	(New Zealand) Kurt Hammer
OB	11	(Fiji) Sireli Bobo*
OB	23	(Australia) Sheldon Tarawa
Coach:
(New Zealand) Ryan Martin

FB	15	(Australia) Jack McGregor
WG	14	(Australia) Rod Davies*
OC	13	(United States) Marcel Brache*
IC	12	(Samoa) Henry Taefu*
WG	11	(Australia) Brad Lacey
FH	22	(Samoa) AJ Alatimu*
SH	9	(Australia) Ian Prior (c)
N8	8	(South Africa) Brynard Stander
OF	7	(Australia) Tevin Ferris
BF	6	(Samoa) Henry Stowers
LK	5	(New Zealand) Johan Bardoul
LK	4	(Australia) Fergus Lee Warner
TP	3	(Australia) Kieran Longbottom
HK	2	(Australia) Heath Tessmann
LP	1	(South Africa) Chris Heiberg
Replacements:
HK	27	(Australia) Andrew Ready
LP	17	(Australia) Markus Vanzati
TP	18	(Australia) Tom Sheminant
FL	20	(New Zealand) Leon Power
FL	19	(Australia) Chris Alcock
SH	21	(Australia) Issak Fines
CE	23	(Australia) Clay Uyen
OB	24	(Fiji) Masivesi Dakuwaqa
Coach:
(Australia) Tim Sampson

Notes:
* denotes internationally capped

==== Asia Rd 6 ====
12 May	South China Tigers	16–40	Western Force	Aberdeen Stadium, HK
4.00 pm HKT (UTC+8)	Try: Slatem 26'; Con: Rosslee (1/1) 27'; Pen: Rosslee (2) 18' 24'; Hughes (1) 51'	Report	Try: Lacey 2' pwt Stander (2) 33' 52'; Alatimu 39'; McGregor 57'; Kaitu'u 67'; Con: Alatimu (2) 34' 39'; Henry Taefu (1) 68'	Referee: Tim Baker (Hong Kong)

Team details

FB	15	(Hong Kong) Jack Neville*
WG	14	(England) Tom Varndell*
OC	13	(Hong Kong) Ben Axten-Burrett*
IC	12	(Australia) Tom Hill
WG	11	(Hong Kong) Harry Sayers*
FH	10	(Hong Kong) Matthew Rosslee*
SH	9	(Hong Kong) Liam Slatem* (c)
N8	8	(Namibia) Luke van der Smit
OF	7	(Wales) James Sawyer
BF	6	(Hong Kong) James Cunningham*
LK	5	(Hong Kong) Kyle Sullivan*
LK	4	(Hong Kong) Fin Field*
TP	3	(Hong Kong) Tau Koloamatangi*
HK	2	(Hong Kong) Dayne Jans*
LP	1	(Hong Kong) Ben Higgins*
Replacements:
HK	16	(New Zealand) Mitch Andrews
LP	17	(Hong Kong) Callum McFeat Smith*
TP	18	(Samoa) Faizal Solomona Penesa
FL	19	(Hong Kong) Kane Boucaut*
FL	20	(Hong Kong) Josh Dowsing*
SH	21	(Hong Kong) Bryn Phillips*
CE	22	(Fiji) Samisoni Viriviri*
OB	23	(England) Glyn Hughes
Coach:
(New Zealand) Craig Hammond

FB	15	(Australia) Clay Uyen
WG	14	(Australia) Rod Davies*
OC	13	(United States) Marcel Brache* (c)
IC	12	(Samoa) Henry Taefu*
WG	11	(Australia) Brad Lacey
FH	22	(Samoa) AJ Alatimu*
SH	9	(Australia) Issak Fines
N8	8	(South Africa) Brynard Stander
OF	7	(Australia) Tevin Ferris
BF	6	(Samoa) Henry Stowers
LK	5	(Australia) Fergus Lee Warner
LK	4	(New Zealand) Johan Bardoul
TP	3	(Australia) Kieran Longbottom
HK	2	(Australia) Heath Tessmann
LP	1	(South Africa) Chris Heiberg
Replacements:
HK	16	(Australia) Feleti Kaitu'u
LP	17	(Australia) Markus Vanzati
TP	18	(Australia) Tom Sheminant
FL	20	(Australia) Ben Grant
FL	19	(Australia) Chris Alcock
SH	21	(Australia) Angus Taylor
CE	24	(Samoa) Rodney Iona*
OB	23	(Australia) Jack McGregor
Coach:
(Australia) Tim Sampson

Notes:
* denotes internationally capped

=== Pacific Showcase ===
==== Pac Rd 1 ====
18 May	Fijian Latui	38–32	Kagifa Samoa	Churchill Park, Lautoka
3.10 pm FJT (UTC+12)	Try: Naugolo 9'; Samusamuvodre 13' pwt Stewart (2) 6' 63'; Dyer 41', Tovilevu 70'; Con: Waqatabu (2/4) 65' 70'; Tikotani Malele (0/1); Pen: Waqatabu (0/1); Cards: Nawaqadau (YC) 30'; Stewart (YC) 30'	Report	Try: McKee 4'; Lam 18', Afu (2) 33' 48'; Con: Fosita (3/4) 4' 33' 45'; Pen: Fosita (2/2) 52' 67'	Attendance: 4,240; Referee: Cameron Stone (New Zealand)

==== Pac Rd 2 ====
25 May	Fijian Latui	15–27	Western Force	Churchill Park, Lautoka
3.10 pm FJT (UTC+12)	Try: Lomani 5'; Voka 57'; Dolokoto 69'; Con: Waqatabu (0/1); Vularika (0/2); Cards: Voka (YC) 20'; Vota (YC) 59'	Report	Try: Fines 23'; McGregor 30'; Kaitu'u 60'; Con: Alatimu (2/2) 24' 31'; Deegan (1/1) 61'; Pen: Alatimu (2/2) 35' 45'	Attendance: 6,000+ Referee: Angus Mabey (New Zealand)

==== Pac Rd 3 ====
31 May	Western Force	63–5	Kagifa Samoa	HBF Park, Perth
7.40 pm AWST (UTC+8)	Try: Uyen 10', Bardoul 26'; Fines (2) 33' 43', Stowers 52'; Lee-Warner 56'; Davies (2) 58' 65', Ferris 62'; Con: Alatimu (4/4) 11' 27' 33' 44'; Deegan (5/5) 53' 57' 59' 63' 66'; Cards: Lee-Warner (YC) 30'	Report	Try: Hala 70+2'; Con: Fosita (0/1); Cards: Su'a (YC) 30'	Attendance: 12,437; Referee: Graham Cooper (Australia)

==== Pac Rd 4 ====
7 June	Kagifa Samoa	31–37	Fijian Latui	Pukekohe Stadium, Auckland
5.40 pm NZST (UTC+12)	Try: Fukofuka 17'; Sauni 37' Makris 42' penalty try 61'; Hala 66'; Con: Makris (2/3) 38' 44'; Hala (0/1); Cards: Fukofuka (YC) 40'	Report	Try: Tagi 12' Manu 20'; Dolokoto 27'; Malele 30'; Naulago 45'; Con: Waqatabu (3/5) 13' 21' 46'; Pen: Waqatabu (2/2) 55', 63'; Cards: Mawi (YC) 58'; Nakarawa (YC) 59'	Attendance: 1,800; Referee: Cameron Stone (New Zealand)

==== Pac Rd 5 ====
15 June	Kagifa Samoa	28–44	Western Force	Ballymore, Brisbane
3.40 pm AEST (UTC+10)	Try: Stowers (2) 11' 28'; Moala 41'; Mafoa 40'; Con: Hala (4/4) 13' 21' 42' 59'; Cards: Tuʻipulotu (YC) 68'	Report	Try: Lee-Warner 2'; Davies 35+1' pwt Fines (2) 48' 55' pwt Ferris 59'; Bardoul 70+1'; Con: Alatimu (1/1) 2'; Deegan (2/3) 50' 70+1'	Attendance: 2,000; Referee: Aaron Pook (Australia)

==== Pac Rd 6 ====
21 June	Western Force	45–24	Fijian Latui	HBF Park, Perth
7.40 pm AWST (UTC+8)	Try: Davies 8'; Bardoul 19', Deegan 24'; Taefu 35', Stander 45'; O'Sullivan 66', Uyen 70'; Con: Deegan (4/5) 20' 25' 35' 67'; Power (1/1) 70'	Report	Try: Tikotani 28'; Tagi 32'; Stewart 37' pwt Con: Waqatabu (1/2) 33'; Pen: Waqatabu 13'	Attendance: 12,832; Referee: Tim Baker (Hong Kong)

=== Bledisloe Showcase ===
9 August	Western Force	74–10	Malaysia Valke	HBF Park, Perth
7.40 pm AWST (UTC+8)	Try: Fines (2) 11' 28'; McGregor (2) 37' 51'; Jooste 25' pwt Tessmann 33'; Lee-Warner 58'; Deegan 61' pwt Lloyd 65', Miller 70'; Con: Deegan (7/7) 12' 30' 35'; 38' 52' 59' 61'; Prior (1/1) 70'	Report	Try: Van Wyk 47'; Cronjé 55'; Con: Rickter (0/1); Pretorius (0/1)	Attendance: 8,537; Referee: Dru Tonks (Australia)

== Other matches ==
19 April	Sanix-Coca-Cola XV	7–43	Western Force	Global Arena, Fukuoka
1.00 pm JST (UTC+9)

27 April	Japan 'A' Wolfpack	51–38	Western Force	Chichibunomiya, Tokyo
3.30 pm JST (UTC+9)

== Media coverage ==
Rapid Rugby had live broadcast television coverage in 18 countries across Asia and Oceania in 2019. Live streaming and video on demand services reached additional viewers within some Asia-Pacific countries, while Rapid Rugby's own website provided live streams and highlight packages to other regions worldwide.

Nine of the fourteen matches of 2019 showcase series were televised. Fox Sports in Australia and related companies Star Sports and Fox Sports Asia provided the live coverage.

National broadcaster SBS showed all nine of these matches live on free-to-air television across Australia via its SBS Viceland channel and also streamed through SBS on Demand. Other Rapid Rugby media partners included Kayo Sports in Australia, Sky Sport in New Zealand and Fiji TV.

	Country	Broadcaster	Type of service
ASIA	China; South Korea	Star Sports (Note: Star Sports televised some Rapid Rugby Showcase matches in 2019.)	Pay television
ASIA	Brunei; Cambodia; Hong Kong; Indonesia; Macau; Malaysia; Mongolia; Myanmar; Philippines; Singapore; Thailand; Vietnam	Fox Sports Asia	Pay television
OCEANIA	Australia	Fox Sports	Pay television
OCEANIA	Australia	Kayo Sports	Subscription streaming Video on demand
OCEANIA	Australia	SBS Viceland	Free-to-air television
OCEANIA	Australia	SBS on Demand sbs.com.au	Free streaming
OCEANIA	New Zealand	Sky Sport (Note: Sky Sport New Zealand televised some Rapid Rugby Showcase matches in 2019.)	Pay television
OCEANIA	Fiji	Fiji TV (Note: Fiji TV showed Fijian Latui games (only 3 matches televised in 2019).)	Free-to-air television
OCEANIA	Fiji	Local channel	TBC
OCEANIA	Papua New Guinea	Fox Sports	Pay television
OCEANIA	Nauru; Samoa; Solomon Islands; Tonga; Vanuatu	Various local channels	TBC
OTHER	All other locations	rapidrugby.com	Free streaming
