= List of Western Force players =

This is a list of rugby union footballers who have played for the Western Force in Super Rugby and the National Rugby Championship. The list includes any player that has played in a regular season match, semi-final or final for the Western Force, ordered by debut date and name. The Western Force first competed in the 2006 Super 14 season, competed in the National Rugby Championship between 2018 and 2019 and competed in Super Rugby AUS since 2025.

== Super Rugby players ==
No.	Name	Caps	Tries	C	P	DG	Points	Debut	Last
1	Richard Brown	90	6				30	10/02/2006	13/07/2013
2	Brendan Cannon	18						10/02/2006	07/04/2007
3	Scott Daruda	13		1	1		5	10/02/2006	09/05/2008
4	Luke Doherty	24						10/02/2006	05/05/2007
5	Scott Fava	33	2				10	10/02/2006	03/05/2008
6	David Fitter	10						10/02/2006	12/05/2006
7	Josh Graham	12						10/02/2006	12/05/2006
8	Gareth Hardy	29	3				15	10/02/2006	02/05/2009
9	Matt Henjak	24						10/02/2006	15/02/2008
10	James Hilgendorf	15	2				10	10/02/2006	05/05/2007
11	Matt Hodgson	140	20				103	10/02/2006	15/07/2017
12	Digby Ioane	20	4				20	10/02/2006	05/05/2007
13	Lachie Mackay	9	1				5	10/02/2006	18/04/2008
14	Tai McIsaac	52	1				5	10/02/2006	16/05/2009
15	Chris O'Young	46	3				15	10/02/2006	08/05/2010
16	Junior Pelesasa	24						10/02/2006	16/05/2009
17	David Pusey	29	1				5	10/02/2006	14/03/2009
18	Nathan Sharpe	92	2				10	10/02/2006	14/07/2012
19	Cameron Shepherd	60	30	29	54		370	10/02/2006	13/04/2012
20	Scott Staniforth	45	18				90	10/02/2006	01/05/2010
21	David Te Moana	7						10/02/2006	12/05/2006
22	John Welborn	10						10/02/2006	12/05/2006
23	Tim Davidson	5						18/02/2006	28/04/2006
24	Brock James	10	1	1			7	18/02/2006	12/05/2006
25	Haig Sare	33	4				20	18/02/2006	02/04/2010
26	Tajhon Mailata	1						24/02/2006	24/02/2006
27	Pekahou Cowan	137	5				25	17/03/2006	05/09/2020
28	Pat O'Connor	8						17/03/2006	20/02/2009
29	Gavin DeBartolo	4	1				5	25/03/2006	14/04/2006
30	Angus Scott	16						25/03/2006	30/03/2007
31	Rudi Vedelago	14						08/04/2006	05/05/2007
32	Luke Holmes	23	1				5	12/05/2006	10/04/2009
33	David Pocock	69	7				35	12/05/2006	30/06/2012
34	Ryan Cross	49	16				80	02/02/2007	14/05/2010
35	Matt Giteau	37	9	55	45	1	293	02/02/2007	16/05/2009
36	Drew Mitchell	38	9				45	02/02/2007	16/05/2009
37	Troy Takiari	26						02/02/2007	16/05/2009
38	AJ Whalley	27	3				15	09/03/2007	16/05/2009
39	Jon McGrath	2						07/04/2007	14/04/2007
40	Nick Cummins	87	16				80	15/02/2008	12/06/2015
41	Tom Hockings	41	2				10	15/02/2008	17/06/2011
42	James Stannard	29	5	4	17		84	15/02/2008	31/03/2012
43	Sitaleki Timani	14						15/02/2008	12/06/2021
44	Tamaiti Horua	19	4				20	22/02/2008	16/05/2009
45	Sam Wykes	87	3				15	22/02/2008	12/06/2015
46	Josh Tatupu	13	3				15	29/02/2008	20/02/2010
47	James O'Connor	38	10	25	70		310	18/04/2008	11/06/2011
48	Dane Haylett-Petty	52	10				50	03/05/2008	15/07/2017
49	Kieran Longbottom	66						03/05/2008	09/04/2021
50	Ben Castle	11						20/02/2009	09/05/2009
51	Josh Valentine	12						20/02/2009	16/05/2009
52	Richard Stanford	11						28/02/2009	27/03/2010
53	Ben Whittaker	33	1				5	24/04/2009	13/04/2013
54	Matt Dunning	21						12/02/2010	17/06/2011
55	Tim Fairbrother	23						12/02/2010	11/06/2011
56	Sam Harris	9						12/02/2010	14/05/2010
57	Nic Henderson	8						12/02/2010	08/05/2010
58	Mitch Inman	19						12/02/2010	17/06/2011
59	Ben McCalman	92	12				60	12/02/2010	09/04/2017
60	Brett Sheehan	43	1	2	4		21	12/02/2010	09/06/2013
61	Stefano Hunt	1						20/02/2010	20/02/2010
62	Luke Jones	2						20/02/2010	27/03/2010
63	Joelin Rapana	1						20/02/2010	20/02/2010
64	Ryan Tyrrell	3						20/02/2010	20/03/2010
65	Mark Bartholomeusz	10	1				5	27/02/2010	14/05/2010
66	David Hill	9	1	6	5	1	35	14/03/2010	08/05/2010
67	Jono Jenkins	6						14/03/2010	21/05/2011
68	Ted Postal	1						27/03/2010	27/03/2010
69	Mark Swanepoel	4						27/03/2010	11/06/2011
70	Nathan Charles	83	4				20	02/04/2010	08/04/2016
71	Justin Turner	11	1				5	02/04/2010	24/05/2014
72	Gene Fairbanks	9						20/02/2011	21/05/2011
73	Alfie Mafi	38	10				50	20/02/2011	19/04/2013
74	Rory Sidey	27	4				20	20/02/2011	14/07/2012
75	David Smith	15	5				25	20/02/2011	17/06/2011
76	Tevita Metuisela	7						05/03/2011	23/04/2011
77	Matt Brandon	1						19/03/2011	19/03/2011
78	Patrick Dellit	40	3				15	19/03/2011	05/06/2015
79	Willie Ripia	7		2	3		13	09/04/2011	17/06/2011
80	Tetera Faulkner	70	2				10	17/06/2011	15/07/2017
81	Angus Cottrell	57	5				25	24/02/2012	09/07/2016
82	Toby Lynn	30	2				10	24/02/2012	13/07/2013
83	Salesi Ma'afu	22						24/02/2012	13/07/2013
84	Napolioni Nalaga	11	2				10	24/02/2012	14/07/2012
85	Winston Stanley	20	4				20	24/02/2012	27/04/2013
86	Elvis Taione	6						24/02/2012	26/05/2012
87	Samu Wara	9	3				15	24/02/2012	20/05/2012
88	Phoenix Battye	12						03/03/2012	18/04/2014
89	Ben Seymour	13	1	3	7		32	03/03/2012	14/07/2012
90	David Harvey	10	1	12	20		89	17/03/2012	30/06/2012
91	Will Tupou	13	1				5	17/03/2012	06/04/2013
92	Kyle Godwin	82	12	3	2		72	31/03/2012	28/05/2022
93	Josh Holmes	10	1				5	06/04/2012	14/07/2012
94	Salesi Manu	9						28/04/2012	13/07/2013
95	Lachlan McCaffrey	7						05/05/2012	14/07/2012
96	Ollie Atkins	8						07/07/2012	05/09/2020
97	Anare Koliavu	1						07/07/2012	07/07/2012
98	Ruan Smith	2						07/07/2012	14/07/2012
99	Chris Alcock	31	2				10	15/02/2013	16/07/2016
100	Sam Christie	4						15/02/2013	06/04/2013
101	Sias Ebersohn	43	2	26	47	3	212	15/02/2013	30/05/2015
102	Alby Mathewson	50	3				15	15/02/2013	29/05/2016
103	Junior Rasolea	39	2				10	15/02/2013	02/07/2016
104	Heath Tessmann	68	2				10	15/02/2013	05/09/2020
105	Hugh McMeniman	13						23/02/2013	05/07/2014
106	Michael Snowden	5						23/02/2013	27/04/2013
107	Jayden Hayward	23	3	18	22		117	02/03/2013	11/07/2014
108	Sam Norton-Knight	8	1				5	31/03/2013	25/05/2013
109	Ed Stubbs	3						13/04/2013	27/04/2013
110	Rory Walton	15						13/04/2013	16/07/2016
111	James Hilterbrand	2						27/04/2013	13/07/2013
112	Ben Jacobs	6						04/05/2013	13/07/2013
113	Zack Holmes	23	1	6	9		44	23/02/2014	12/06/2015
114	Ollie Hoskins	26						23/02/2014	12/06/2015
115	Luke Morahan	41	11				55	23/02/2014	26/05/2017
116	Brynard Stander	72	4				20	23/02/2014	13/05/2022
117	Wilhelm Steenkamp	21						23/02/2014	12/06/2015
118	Ian Prior	95	1	45	40		215	01/03/2014	15/03/2024
119	Marcel Brache	55	6				30	08/03/2014	26/03/2021
120	Adam Coleman	47	2				10	08/03/2014	15/07/2017
121	Chris Tuatara-Morrison	10	2				10	12/04/2014	11/07/2014
122	Luke Burton	25		10	9		47	17/05/2014	03/06/2017
123	Francois van Wyk	20	1				5	24/05/2014	15/07/2017
124	Ryan Hodson	1						30/05/2014	30/05/2014
125	Dillyn Leyds	3						30/05/2014	05/07/2014
126	Steve Mafi	26	1				5	15/02/2015	07/05/2016
127	Chris Heiberg	31						21/02/2015	05/09/2020
128	Mitchell Scott	4	1				5	21/02/2015	09/05/2015
129	Kane Koteka	44	1				5	27/02/2015	21/02/2026
130	Ross Haylett-Petty	30	1				5	18/04/2015	15/07/2017
131	Ryan Louwrens	24	3				15	24/04/2015	01/04/2017
132	Guy Millar	14						02/05/2015	16/07/2016
133	Jermaine Ainsley	17						27/02/2016	07/07/2017
134	Peter Grant	20		18	19		93	27/02/2016	15/07/2017
135	Jono Lance	28	5	13	21		114	27/02/2016	26/03/2021
136	Semisi Masirewa	17						27/02/2016	20/05/2017
137	Ben Tapuai	12	3	2	1		22	27/02/2016	16/07/2016
138	Albert Nikoro	3						18/03/2016	23/04/2016
139	Richard Hardwick	19	2				10	01/04/2016	15/07/2017
140	Harry Scoble	8	2				10	23/04/2016	16/07/2016
141	Ammon Matuauto	1						29/04/2016	29/04/2016
142	Anaru Rangi	9						29/04/2016	15/07/2017
143	Matt Philip	13	1				5	02/07/2016	15/07/2017
144	Ben Daley	8						25/02/2017	29/04/2017
145	Bill Meakes	14	1				5	25/02/2017	15/07/2017
146	Isi Naisarani	19	1				5	25/02/2017	26/05/2023
147	Chance Peni	7	4				20	25/02/2017	07/07/2017
148	Tatafu Polota-Nau	14	2				10	25/02/2017	15/07/2017
149	Curtis Rona	14	1				5	25/02/2017	15/07/2017
150	Michael Ruru	11						25/02/2017	15/07/2017
151	Alex Newsome	13	5				25	02/03/2017	15/07/2017
152	Robbie Coleman	3						10/03/2017	01/04/2017
153	Onehunga Havili	4						10/03/2017	13/05/2017
154	Richie Arnold	7	1				5	24/03/2017	03/06/2017
155	Shambeckler Vui	6						01/04/2017	15/07/2017
156	Lewis Carmichael	8						22/04/2017	15/07/2017
157	James Verity-Amm	8	1				5	29/04/2017	15/07/2017
158	Mitch Short	3						06/05/2017	26/05/2017
159	Jake Abel	4						11/07/2020	14/08/2020
160	Johan Bardoul	4						11/07/2020	05/09/2020
161	Ollie Callan	33	2				10	11/07/2020	05/04/2024
162	Tevin Ferris	5						11/07/2020	28/08/2020
163	Greg Holmes	26						11/07/2020	28/05/2022
164	Nick Jooste	5						11/07/2020	05/09/2020
165	Feleti Kaitu'u	48	4				20	11/07/2020	25/05/2024
166	Brad Lacey	12	1				5	11/07/2020	28/05/2022
167	Fergus Lee-Warner	36	5				25	11/07/2020	28/05/2022
168	Jack McGregor	16	2				10	11/07/2020	28/05/2021
169	Byron Ralston	22	7				35	11/07/2020	28/05/2022
170	Andrew Ready	31	8				40	11/07/2020	28/05/2022
171	Henry Stowers	7						11/07/2020	05/09/2020
172	Henry Taefu	13	2				10	11/07/2020	21/05/2021
173	Jeremy Thrush	33	5				25	11/07/2020	11/03/2023
174	Angus Wagner	31	1				5	11/07/2020	03/06/2023
175	Nick Frisby	5						25/07/2020	05/09/2020
176	Richard Kahui	29	1				5	25/07/2020	28/05/2022
177	Tom Sheminant	5						25/07/2020	28/08/2020
178	Jake Strachan	28	3	8	5		46	14/08/2020	15/04/2023
179	Dom Hardman	1						05/09/2020	05/09/2020
180	Tim Anstee	46	5				25	19/02/2021	05/04/2024
181	Tomás Cubelli	13	2				10	19/02/2021	04/06/2021
182	Rob Kearney	8	1				5	19/02/2021	12/06/2021
183	Tevita Kuridrani	11	1				5	19/02/2021	12/06/2021
184	Tomás Lezana	5						19/02/2021	09/04/2021
185	Ryan McCauley	33						19/02/2021	12/05/2023
186	Jake McIntyre	22	3	5	5		40	19/02/2021	28/05/2022
187	Santiago Medrano	50	1				5	19/02/2021	01/06/2024
188	Tom Robertson	57	3				15	19/02/2021	09/05/2026
189	Jack Winchester	6						19/02/2021	28/05/2022
190	Domingo Miotti	10	1	10	14	1	70	05/03/2021	12/06/2021
191	Toni Pulu	21	5				25	05/03/2021	03/06/2023
192	Jordan Olowofela	10	5				25	26/03/2021	12/06/2021
193	Michael McDonald	6	1	3			11	12/06/2021	28/05/2022
194	Issak Fines-Leleiwasa	45	1				5	20/02/2022	17/05/2025
195	Bayley Kuenzle	47	9	5	2		61	20/02/2022	23/05/2026
196	Harry Lloyd	8	1				5	20/02/2022	16/04/2022
197	Manasa Mataele	24	8				40	20/02/2022	03/06/2023
198	Reesjan Pasitoa	20	2				10	20/02/2022	17/05/2025
199	Izack Rodda	20						20/02/2022	01/06/2024
200	Grason Makara	2						04/03/2022	07/05/2022
201	Jackson Pugh	13	3				15	04/03/2022	06/05/2023
202	Bo Abra	12	1				5	19/03/2022	26/05/2023
203	Will Sankey	3						08/04/2022	28/05/2022
204	Reece Tapine	2						08/04/2022	07/05/2022
205	Alex Masibaka	2						29/04/2022	07/05/2022
206	Siosifa Amone	13	2				10	25/02/2023	03/06/2023
207	Bryce Hegarty	6	2	9	11		61	25/02/2023	29/04/2023
208	Tom Horton	35	6				30	25/02/2023	10/05/2025
209	Felix Kalapu	14	1				5	25/02/2023	03/06/2023
210	Zach Kibirige	11	8				40	25/02/2023	26/05/2023
211	George Poolman	31	3				15	25/02/2023	17/05/2025
212	Sam Spink	23	3				15	25/02/2023	01/06/2024
213	Hamish Stewart	54	4	1			22	25/02/2023	30/05/2026
214	Chase Tiatia	27	6				30	25/02/2023	25/05/2024
215	Michael Wells	21	5				25	25/02/2023	01/06/2024
216	Jeremy Williams	48	6				30	25/02/2023	30/05/2026
217	Folau Fainga'a	7	4				20	05/03/2023	03/06/2023
218	Nikolai Foliaki	2						11/03/2023	06/05/2023
219	Rahboni Warren-Vosayaco	9						11/03/2023	03/06/2023
220	Gareth Simpson	4	1	3			11	19/03/2023	03/06/2023
221	Marley Pearce	33	2				10	26/03/2023	30/05/2026
222	Jacob Norris	1						15/04/2023	15/04/2023
223	Charlie Hancock	5						29/04/2023	09/03/2024
224	Carlo Tizzano	43	31				155	29/04/2023	30/05/2026
225	Max Burey	34	3	18	8		75	06/05/2023	23/05/2026
226	Wilton Rebolo	1						03/06/2023	03/06/2023
227	Ben Donaldson	38	5	91	31		300	23/02/2024	30/05/2026
228	Lopeti Faifua	20	2				10	23/02/2024	09/05/2026
229	Tom Franklin	9						23/02/2024	04/05/2024
230	Ben Funnell	6						23/02/2024	01/06/2024
231	Will Harris	40	2				10	23/02/2024	30/05/2026
232	Titi Nofoagatotoa	3						23/02/2024	24/05/2025
233	Harry Potter	19	8				40	23/02/2024	24/05/2025
234	Tiaan Tauakipulu	18						23/02/2024	24/05/2025
235	Nic White	23	2				10	23/02/2024	24/05/2025
236	Ryan Coxon	19	1				5	01/03/2024	24/05/2025
237	Josh Bartlett	5						15/03/2024	04/05/2024
238	Reed Prinsep	25	1				5	15/03/2024	24/05/2025
239	Sam Carter	10	1				5	30/03/2024	17/05/2025
240	Joel Hintz	1						05/04/2024	05/04/2024
241	Henry O'Donnell	5						05/04/2024	11/05/2024
242	Kurtley Beale	25	1	1			7	20/04/2024	30/05/2026
243	Henry Robertson	19	2				10	04/05/2024	09/05/2026
244	Harry Hoopert	3						11/05/2024	25/05/2024
245	Ronan Leahy	2						25/05/2024	01/06/2024
246	Nick Champion de Crespigny	24						15/02/2025	30/05/2026
247	Nic Dolly	24	5				25	15/02/2025	30/05/2026
248	Vaiolini Ekuasi	17	3				15	15/02/2025	30/05/2026
249	Mac Grealy	26	8				40	15/02/2025	30/05/2026
250	Divad Palu	5						15/02/2025	07/03/2026
251	Darcy Swain	27	2				10	15/02/2025	30/05/2026
252	Sio Tomkinson	11	1				5	15/02/2025	17/05/2025
253	Dylan Pietsch	15	9				45	15/02/2025	30/05/2026
254	Atu Moli	10						15/02/2025	17/05/2025
255	Brandon Paenga-Amosa	20	3				15	22/02/2025	30/05/2026
256	Joshua Smith	6						22/02/2025	02/05/2025
257	Josh Thompson	3						08/03/2025	02/05/2025
258	Coby Miln	1		1			2	15/03/2025	15/03/2025
259	Fatongia Paea	2						25/04/2025	24/05/2025
260	Doug Philipson	1						25/04/2025	25/04/2025
261	Albert Alcock	1						02/05/2025	02/05/2025
262	Alex Harford	2		1			2	17/05/2025	24/05/2025
263	George Bridge	13	2				10	14/02/2026	30/05/2026
264	Nathan Hastie	12						14/02/2026	30/05/2026
265	Harry Johnson-Holmes	14	3				15	14/02/2026	30/05/2026
266	Franco Molina	13	4				20	14/02/2026	30/05/2026
267	Misinale Epenisa	12	2				10	14/02/2026	30/05/2026
268	Sef Fa'agase	14						14/02/2026	30/05/2026
269	Leonel Oviedo	4	1				5	14/02/2026	28/03/2026
270	Darby Lancaster	5	4				20	27/02/2026	04/04/2026
271	Agustín Moyano	5						27/02/2026	30/05/2026
272	Taj Annan	1						13/03/2026	13/03/2026
273	Jack Daly	2						04/04/2026	11/04/2026
274	Zac Lomax	7	2				10	11/04/2026	30/05/2026
275	Boston Fakafanua	1						23/05/2026	23/05/2026

== National Rugby Championship players ==
No.	Name	Caps	Tries	C	P	DG	Points	Debut	Last
1	Chris Alcock	8	2				10	02/09/2018	21/09/2019
2	Marcel Brache	4	4				20	02/09/2018	22/09/2018
3	Rodney Davies	8	7				35	02/09/2018	22/10/2018
4	Andrew Deegan	17	3	29	1		76	02/09/2018	26/10/2019
5	Tevin Ferris	17	2				10	02/09/2018	26/10/2019
6	Chris Heiberg	12						02/09/2018	12/10/2019
7	Fergus Lee-Warner	17	2				10	02/09/2018	26/10/2019
8	Jack McGregor	15	5				25	02/09/2018	26/10/2019
9	Cameron Orr	16	2				10	02/09/2018	26/10/2019
10	Ian Prior	14	1	47	1		102	02/09/2018	06/10/2019
11	Harry Scoble	6						02/09/2018	07/10/2018
12	Brynard Stander	16	5				25	02/09/2018	26/10/2019
13	Henry Taefu	4	1				5	02/09/2018	13/09/2018
14	Jeremy Thrush	15	4				20	02/09/2018	26/10/2019
15	Clay Uyen	4	1				5	02/09/2018	22/10/2018
16	Feleti Kaitu'u	8	6				30	02/09/2018	12/10/2019
17	Harry Lloyd	17	2				10	02/09/2018	26/10/2019
18	Kieran Longbottom	8						02/09/2018	22/10/2018
19	Harrison Orr	6	1				5	02/09/2018	07/10/2018
20	Rodney Iona	8	2				10	02/09/2018	22/10/2018
21	Leon Power	7						02/09/2018	22/10/2018
22	Issak Fines-Leleiwasa	16	3				15	02/09/2018	26/10/2019
23	Peter Grant	6		2			4	02/09/2018	07/10/2018
24	Masivesi Dakuwaqa	6	3				15	09/09/2018	22/10/2018
25	Logan Ede	1						09/09/2018	09/09/2018
26	Ma'alonga Konelio	1						09/09/2018	09/09/2018
27	Heath Tessmann	15	9				45	16/09/2018	26/10/2019
28	Henry Stowers	13						22/09/2018	26/10/2019
29	George Pisi	1						30/09/2018	30/09/2018
30	Markus Vanzati	1						30/09/2018	30/09/2018
31	Brad Lacey	4	1				5	30/09/2018	22/10/2018
32	Tom Sheminant	8	1				5	13/10/2018	26/10/2019
33	AJ Alatimu	1						13/10/2018	13/10/2018
34	Johan Bardoul	6	1				5	31/08/2019	06/10/2019
35	Ben Grant	5						31/08/2019	26/10/2019
36	Dom Hardman	6	1				5	31/08/2019	26/10/2019
37	Nick Jooste	6	3				15	31/08/2019	26/10/2019
38	Jonah Placid	9	10				50	31/08/2019	26/10/2019
39	Byron Ralston	9	7				35	31/08/2019	26/10/2019
40	Kitione Ratu	2						31/08/2019	07/09/2019
41	Andrew Ready	4	1				5	31/08/2019	26/10/2019
42	Carlo Tizzano	7	2				10	31/08/2019	26/10/2019
43	Grason Makara	4						31/08/2019	21/09/2019
44	Jake Strachan	9	1	1			7	31/08/2019	26/10/2019
45	Chris Tuatara-Morrison	6						15/09/2019	26/10/2019
46	Leonaitasi Feke	4	2				10	15/09/2019	06/10/2019
47	Chris Miller	2	1				5	21/09/2019	12/10/2019
48	Pama Fou	5	4				20	29/09/2019	26/10/2019
49	Rory O'Sullivan	3						12/10/2019	26/10/2019

== Super Rugby AUS players ==
No.	Name	Caps	Tries	C	P	DG	Points	Debut	Last
1	Albert Alcock	7	2				10	12/09/2025	03/10/2026
2	Max Burey	4	3	6	1		30	12/09/2025	05/10/2025
3	Vaiolini Ekuasi	4	1				5	12/09/2025	05/10/2025
4	Boston Fakafanua	7	1				5	12/09/2025	03/10/2026
5	Viliami Fine	3	1				5	12/09/2025	28/09/2025
6	Mac Grealy	8	2	1			12	12/09/2025	03/10/2026
7	Will Harris	8	1				5	12/09/2025	03/10/2026
8	Kane Koteka	7						12/09/2025	03/10/2026
9	Bradley Kuhn	5						12/09/2025	03/10/2026
10	Justin Landman	3	1				5	12/09/2025	05/10/2025
11	Marley Pearce	4						12/09/2025	05/10/2025
12	George Poolman	4	2				10	12/09/2025	05/10/2025
13	Henry Robertson	4	1				5	12/09/2025	05/10/2025
14	Darcy Swain	4	2				10	12/09/2025	05/10/2025
15	Mitch Watts	4	1				5	12/09/2025	05/10/2025
16	Kurtley Beale	8	1	6			17	12/09/2025	03/10/2026
17	Max Sawers	8						12/09/2025	03/10/2026
18	Reed Prinsep	3						12/09/2025	05/10/2025
19	Wes Thomas	4						12/09/2025	05/10/2025
20	Issak Fines-Leleiwasa	4						12/09/2025	05/10/2025
21	Titi Nofoagatotoa	4						12/09/2025	05/10/2025
22	Max Johnson	2						12/09/2025	20/09/2025
23	Sean Paranihi	4						12/09/2025	05/10/2025
24	Tiaan Tauakipulu	3						20/09/2025	05/10/2025
25	Ben Donaldson	3	1	4			13	20/09/2025	05/10/2025
26	Ronan Leahy	6	2				10	20/09/2025	03/10/2026
27	Jack Daly	5	3				15	28/09/2025	03/10/2026
28	Henry Palmer	1	1				5	28/09/2025	28/09/2025
29	Ollie Barrett	1						28/09/2025	28/09/2025
30	Wallace Charlie	4	2				10	12/09/2026	03/10/2026
31	Nic Dolly	4	2				10	12/09/2026	03/10/2026
32	Nathan Hastie	4	5				25	12/09/2026	03/10/2026
33	Zak Healey	4						12/09/2026	03/10/2026
34	Jackson Iose	4	1				5	12/09/2026	03/10/2026
35	Zac Lomax	2						12/09/2026	20/09/2026
36	Harry McLaughlin-Phillips	2	1	5			15	12/09/2026	03/10/2026
37	Seta Baker	2	1				5	12/09/2026	20/09/2026
38	Regin Pratt	4						12/09/2026	03/10/2026
39	Tama Anderson	2						12/09/2026	20/09/2026
40	Junior Passi	1						12/09/2026	12/09/2026
41	Tim Sail	4						12/09/2026	03/10/2026
42	Luke Aiken	4						12/09/2026	03/10/2026
43	Wil Taylor	2						12/09/2026	27/09/2026
44	Nick Champion de Crespigny	1						20/09/2026	20/09/2026
45	Tom Robertson	3						20/09/2026	03/10/2026
46	Misinale Epenisa	3	1				5	20/09/2026	03/10/2026
47	James O'Connor	2						20/09/2026	03/10/2026
48	Dylan Pietsch	2	3				15	27/09/2026	03/10/2026
49	Aden Ekanayake	2						27/09/2026	03/10/2026
50	Evan Hooper	1						27/09/2026	27/09/2026
51	Nate Gallagher	1						03/10/2026	03/10/2026
