= 2020 Global Rapid Rugby season =

2020 Rapid Rugby Season
- League: Global Rapid Rugby
- Sport: Rugby
- Duration: Season cancelled after one round
- Teams: 6

Seasons
- ← 2019 2021 →

The 2020 season of Global Rapid Rugby ended after only one round of competition due to the COVID-19 pandemic and was not continued. The season was launched in February 2020 as the first full home and away Rapid Rugby tournament, following the shorter showcase series held the previous year.

It featured six teams from across the Asia-Pacific region competing for A$1 million in prize money. On 15 March 2020 the competition was suspended due to travel, quarantine and public health restrictions, before being cancelled on 7 April 2020.

== Teams ==
The following six teams were announced for the Rapid Rugby season in 2020:

Team	City	Stadium	Capacity	Head coach
China Lions (Note: The China Lions, backed by the China Rugby Football Association and New Zealand's Bay of Plenty Rugby Union, were originally scheduled to host three of their home games in Shanghai. One of those fixtures was moved to Taupo in New Zealand and the other two to Adelaide in Australia due to health concerns relating to the coronavirus pandemic.)	Rotorua Taupo Adelaide	Rotorua International Stadium Owen Delany Park Coopers Stadium	34,000 20,000 16,500	Mike Rogers
(Fiji) Fijian Latui	Suva	ANZ Stadium Albert Park	15,000 3,000	Senirusi Seruvakula
(Fiji) Fijian Latui	Lautoka Nausori	Churchill Park Ratu Cakobau Park	9,500 8,000	Senirusi Seruvakula
Manuma Samoa	Apia	Apia Park	12,000	Brian Lima
Malaysia Valke	Kuala Lumpur Subang	Bukit Jalil National Stadium Stadium TUDM	87,411 6,000	Rudy Joubert
(Hong Kong) South China Tigers	Hong Kong	Hong Kong Stadium Siu Sai Wan Sports Ground Aberdeen Sports Ground	40,000 11,981 9,000	Craig Hammond
(Australia) Western Force	Perth	HBF Park	20,500	Tim Sampson

== Standings ==
The top two teams in the standings after the completion of the regular season were scheduled to meet in a grand final match on 6 June to decide the championship title. A modified version of the rugby bonus points system was used.

One bonus point was awarded for each of the following in a game:

- a team scoring 4 or more tries;
- a winning team scoring at least 3 tries more than their opponent;
- a team defeated by a margin of five points or under.

Four points were awarded for a win and none for a loss. Two points were awarded to each team for a draw.

Global Rapid Rugby
#	Team	P	W	D	L	PD	TF	TA	TB	LB	Pts
1	(Australia) Western Force	1	1	0	0	+37	7	2	2	0	6
2	(Hong Kong) South China Tigers	1	1	0	0	+25	8	3	2	0	6
3	China Lions	1	1	0	0	+7	4	3	1	0	5
4	(Fiji) Fijian Latui	1	0	0	1	−7	3	4	0	0	0
5	Manuma Samoa	1	0	0	1	−25	3	8	0	0	0
6	Malaysia Valke	1	0	0	1	−37	2	7	0	0	0
Updated: 15 March 2020; Source: rapidrugby.com (archived)

== Regular season ==
The schedule was announced in February 2020.

=== Round 1 ===
14 March	Fijian Latui	22–29	China Lions	ANZ Stadium, Suva
6.15 pm FJT (UTC+12)	Try: Radroro; Raiyala; Vota; Con: Tela (2/3); Pen: Tela (1/1)	Report	Try: Fuatai; Penalty try Tatafu, Little; Con: Hollinshead (3/3); Pen: Hollinshead (1/1)	Referee: Cam Stone (New Zealand)

14 March	Manuma Samoa	27–52	South China Tigers	HBF Park, Perth
4.10 pm AWST (UTC+8)	Try: Soisoi (2, one pwt); Sao; Con: Leuila (1/2); Pen: Leuila (2/2)	Report	Try: Dowsing (2); Watkins, De Thierry (2); Prior, Van de Smit; McFeat Smith; Con: Hughes (6/8)	Referee: Nick Briant (New Zealand)

14 March	Western Force	51–14	Malaysia Valke	HBF Park, Perth
6.15 pm AWST (UTC+8)	Try: Lacey (2); Brache, Taefu (pwt); Bardoul, McGregor; Alcock; Con: Prior (6/6)	Report	Try: Jaggers; Wellman; Con: Nel (2/2)	Referee: Tim Baker (Hong Kong)

The remaining nine rounds of competition matches and the final were cancelled.
