= 2018 World Series Rugby season =

World Series Rugby
- Countries: Australia (2 teams); Fiji (1 team); Hong Kong (1 team); Japan (1 team); New Zealand (1 teams); Samoa (1 team); Tonga (1 team)
- Matches played: 7

World Series Rugby was a series of rugby union exhibition matches played in 2018 between the Perth-based Western Force and opposition teams from the Asia-Pacific region. It was the forerunner of Global Rapid Rugby, which commenced in 2019. World Series Rugby was created after the Western Force team was axed from the Australian Super Rugby conference at the end of the 2017 season.

== Teams ==
National teams	Club teams
Tonga A	Force
Samoa A	Rebels
Hong Kong Dragons	Crusaders
Fiji A	Wild Knights

== Fixtures ==
=== May–June ===
4 May 2018	Force	24–14	Fiji A	nib Stadium, Perth
18:30 AWST (UTC+8)	Try: Brache 11'; Bardoul 15'; Stander 26'; Kaitu’u 57'; Con: Grant (2/4) 13' 16'	Report:	Try: Vularika 45'; Voka 75'; Con: Veitokani (2/2) 46' 76'; Cards: Vularika (YC) 14'	Attendance: 19,466

Team details

FB	15	Peter Grant
RW	14	Rod Davies
OC	13	Marcel Brache
IC	12	Rod Iona
LW	11	Brad Lacey
FH	10	Andrew Deegan
SH	9	Ian Prior (c)
N8	8	Brynard Stander
OF	7	Chris Alcock
BF	6	Trevin Feris
RL	5	Johan Bardoul
LL	4	Fergus Lee-Warner
TP	3	Chris Heiberg
HK	2	Heath Tessmann (VC)
LP	1	Harry Lloyd
Replacements:
RE	16	Alifeleti Kaitu'u
RE	17	Tom Sheminant
RE	18	Kieran Longbottom
RE	19	Leon Power
RE	20	Harrison Orr
RE	21	Ryan Louwrens
RE	22	AJ Alatimu
RE	23	Clay Uyen
Coach:
(Australia) Tim Sampson

FB	15
RW	14
OC	13
IC	12
LW	11
FH	10
SH	9
N8	8
OF	7
BF	6
RL	5
LL	4
TP	3
HK	2
LP	1
Replacements:
RE	16
RE	17
RE	18
RE	19
RE	20
RE	21
RE	22
RE	23
Coach:
(Tonga) Toutai Kefu

13 May 2018	Force	47–17	Tonga A	nib Stadium, Perth
16:00 AWST (UTC+8)		Report:		Attendance: 16,323

Team details

FB	15	Clay Uyen
RW	14	Rod Davies
OC	13	Marcel Brache
IC	12	Rod Iona
LW	11	Brad Lacey
FH	10	Andrew Deegan
SH	9	Ian Prior (c)
N8	8	Brynard Stander
OF	7	Chris Alcock
BF	6	Trevin Feris
RL	5	Johan Bardoul
LL	4	Fergus Lee-Warner
TP	3	Chris Heiberg
HK	2	Alifeleti Kaitu'u
LP	1	Harry Lloyd
Replacements:
RE	16	Harry Soble
RE	17	Tom Sheminant
RE	18	Kieran Longbottom
RE	19	Leon Power
RE	20	Harrison Orr
RE	21	Elliot Turner
RE	22	AJ Alatimu
RE	23	Henry Taefu
Coach:
(Australia) Tim Sampson

FB	15
RW	14
OC	13
IC	12
LW	11
FH	10
SH	9
N8	8
OF	7
BF	6
RL	5
LL	4
TP	3
HK	2
LP	1
Replacements:
RE	16
RE	17
RE	18
RE	19
RE	20
RE	21
RE	22
RE	23
Coach:
(Tonga) Toutai Kefu

9 June 2018	Force	12–28	Rebels	nib Stadium, Perth
19:00 AWST (UTC+8)	Try: Lloyd; Lee-Warner; Con: Deegan 1	Report:	Try: Debreczeni; Meakes; Adams; Tuala; Con: Adams 4 Cards: Ruru (YC) 75'	Attendance: 13,907

Team details

FB	15	Peter Grant
RW	14	Rod Davies
OC	13	Henry Taefu
IC	12	AJ Alatimu
LW	11	Brad Lacey
FH	10	Andrew Deegan
SH	9	Ian Prior (c)
N8	8	Brynard Stander
OF	7	Chris Alcock
BF	6	Tevin Ferris
RL	5	Johan Bardoul
LL	4	Fergus Lee-Warner
TP	3	Chris Heiberg
HK	2	Heath Tessmann
LP	1	Harry Lloyd
Replacements:
RE	16	Feleti Kaitu’u
RE	17	Markus Vanzati
RE	18	Tom Sheminant
RE	19	Leon Power
RE	20	Harrison Orr
RE	21	Issak Fines-Leleiwasa
RE	22	George Pisi
RE	23	Clay Uyen
Coach:
(Australia) Tim Sampson

FB	15	Jack Debreczeni
RW	14	Kiti Ratu
OC	13	Tom English (c)
IC	12	Billy Meakes
LW	11	Henry Hutchinson
FH	10	Tayler Adams
SH	9	Harrison Goddard
N8	8	Angus Cottrell
OF	7	Richard Hardwick
BF	6	Ross Haylett–Petty
RL	5	Matt Philip
LL	4	Sam Jeffries
TP	3	Pone Fa'amausili
HK	2	Nathan Charles
LP	1	Tom Moloney
Replacements:
RE	16	Matt Gibbons
RE	17	Andrew Tuala
RE	18	Jermaine Ainsley
RE	19	Nick Champion de Crespigny
RE	20	Rohan O'Reagan
RE	21	Jack Johnson
RE	22	Michael Ruru
RE	23	Hunter Paisami
RE	24	Jack McGregor
Coach:
(South Africa) David Wessels

- Squad reference

22 June 2018	Force	8–44	Crusaders	nib Stadium, Perth
18:30 AWST (UTC+8)	Try: Prior; Pen: Grant	Report:	Try: Drummond PT'; Hunt; Mataele; Tamanivalu; Faingaanuku; Con: Hunt 6	Attendance: 14,259

Team details

FB	15	Peter Grant
RW	14	Masivesi Dakuwaqa
OC	13	Brad Lacey
IC	12	Rod Davies
LW	11	Brad Lacey
FH	10	Andrew Deegan
SH	9	Ian Prior (c)
N8	8	Brynard Stander
OF	7	Chris Alcock
BF	6	Henry Stowers
RL	5	Jeremy Thrush
LL	4	Fergus Lee-Warner
TP	3	Chris Heiberg
HK	2	Heath Tessmann
LP	1	Harry Lloyd
Replacements:
RE	16	Feleti Kaitu’u
RE	17	Cameron Orr
RE	18	Tom Sheminant
RE	19	Leon Power
RE	20	Johan Bardoul
RE	21	Tevin Ferris
RE	22	Harrison Orr
RE	23	Issak Fines-Leleiwasa
RE	24	Henry Taefu
RE	25	Clay Uyen
Coach:
(Australia) Tim Sampson

FB	15
RW	14
OC	13
IC	12
LW	11
FH	10
SH	9
N8	8
OF	7
BF	6
RL	5
LL	4
TP	3
HK	2
LP	1
Replacements:
RE	16
RE	17
RE	18
RE	19
RE	20
RE	21
RE	22
RE	23
Coach:
(New Zealand) Scott Robertson

=== July–August ===
14 July 2018	Force	33–5	Samoa A	nib Stadium, Perth
19:00 AWST (UTC+8)	Try: Stowers (2) 14' m 23', Stander 7'; Alcock 47', Heiberg 72'; Con: Grant (3/4) 8' 24' 48'; McGregor (1/1) 73'; Cards: Ferris (YC) 68'	Report	Try: Lolo 68' m Con: Malielegaoi (0/1)	Attendance: 11,678

Team details

FB	15	Peter Grant
RW	14	Masivesi Dakuwaqa
OC	13	Marcel Brache
IC	12	Henry Taefu
LW	11	Brad Lacey
FH	10	Andrew Deegan
SH	9	Ian Prior (c)
N8	8	Brynard Stander
OF	7	Chris Alcock
BF	6	Henry Stowers
RL	5	Jeremy Thrush
LL	4	Johan Bardoul
TP	3	Tom Sheminant
HK	2	Feleti Kaitu’u
LP	1	Harry Lloyd
Replacements:
RE	16	Heath Tessmann
RE	17	Cameron Orr
RE	18	Chris Heiberg
RE	19	Leon Power
RE	20	Tevin Ferris
RE	21	Issak Fines-Leleiwasa
RE	22	AJ Alatimu
RE	23	Jack McGregor
Coach:
(Australia) Tim Sampson

FB	15	John Vaili
RW	14	Ivan Safua
OC	13	Jay Malielegaoi
IC	12	Gordon Lemision
LW	11	Paulo Scanlan
FH	10	Mesala Seumalo
SH	9	Morman Uili
N8	8	Fagu Malloy
OF	7	Lio Lolo
BF	6	Levi Asifa'amatala
RL	5	Ikifusi Matamu
LL	4	Mikaele Tapili
TP	3	Ueselani Aimaasu
HK	2	Afa Aiono (c)
LP	1	Siliva Tapu
Replacements:
RE	16	Leo Brown
RE	17	Turi Uini
RE	22	Alofaaga Sao
RE	19	Elia Togitele
RE	20	Steve Tuiuli
RE	21	Pupi Ah See
RE	22	Henry Suauu
RE	23	Vaifagaloa Mamoe
Coach:
(Samoa) Brian Lima

10 August 2018	Force	45–24	Hong Kong Dragons	nib Stadium, Perth
18:30 AWST (UTC+8)	Try: McGregor (2) 3' c, 21' c Uyen (2) 35' m, 63' m H. Orr 49' c Penalty try 69'; Scoble 80' c Con: Grant (3/5) 3', 22', 50'; Stander (1/1) 80'	Report: Details	Try: Hrstich 28' c Andrews 54' m McCormick-Houston 73' c Warner 78' m Con: De Theirry (1/1) 29'; Keith (1/3) 74'	Attendance: 14,018

Team details

FB	15	Jack McGregor
RW	14	Clay Uyen
OC	13	Marcel Brache
IC	12	Henry Taefu
LW	11	Brad Lacey
FH	10	Peter Grant
SH	9	Ian Prior (c)
N8	8	Brynard Stander
OF	7	Tevin Ferris
BF	6	Harrison Orr
RL	5	Leon Power
LL	4	Jeremy Thrush
TP	3	Chris Heiberg
HK	2	Heath Tessmann
LP	1	Cameron Orr
Replacements:
RE	16	Harry Scoble
RE	17	Markus Vanzati
RE	18	Kieran Longbottom
RE	19	Fergus Lee-Warner
RE	20	Henry Stowers
RE	21	Issak Fines-Leleiwasa
RE	22	AJ Alatimu
RE	23	Rodney Iona
RE	24	George Pisi
Coach:
(Australia) Tim Sampson

FB	15	Casey Stone
RW	14	Charlie Higson-Smith
OC	13	Tyler Spitz
IC	12	Ben Axten-Burrett
LW	11	Sam Purvis
FH	10	Nathan De Theirry
SH	9	Bryn Phillips
N8	8	Josh Hrstich
OF	7	Josh Dowsing
BF	6	James Sawyer
RL	5	Craig Lodge
LL	4	Fin Field
TP	3	Grant Kemp
HK	2	Mitch Andrews
LP	1	Tau Kolomatangi
Replacements:
RE	16	Johnnie McCormick-Houston
RE	17	Ben Higgins
RE	18	Callum McFeat Smith
RE	19	Chris Allman
RE	20	Chris Calanza
RE	21	Ben Willis
RE	22	Ruan Du Plooy
RE	23	Rob Keith
RE	24	Lewis Warner
RE	25	Callum Tam
Coach:
Leigh Jones

17 August 2018	Force	50–45	Wild Knights	nib Stadium, Perth
18:30 AWST (UTC+8)	Try: Brache 2 Stander 2 McGregor; Lacey; Thrush; Millar; Con: Prior 7 Pen: Prior	Report:	Try: Fukuoka PT'; Uchida; Hoire; Millar; Yamasawa; Con: Barnes 4 Yamasawa; Pen: Barnes	Attendance: 16,000

Team details

FB	15	Jack McGregor
RW	14	Clay Uyen
OC	13	Marcel Brache
IC	12	Henry Taefu
LW	11	Brad Lacey
FH	10	Andrew Deegan
SH	9	Ian Prior (C)
N8	8	Brynard Stander
OF	7	Tevin Ferris
BF	6	Harrison Orr
RL	5	Jeremy Thrush
LL	4	Leon Power
TP	3	Chris Heiberg
HK	2	Heath Tessmann (VC)
LP	1	Cameron Orr
Replacements:
RE	16	Feleti Kaitu'u
RE	17	Harry Lloyd
RE	18	Kieran Longbottom
RE	19	Fergus Lee-Warner
RE	20	Henry Stowers
RE	21	Issak Fines
RE	22	Peter Grant
RE	23	George Pisi
Coach:
(Australia) Tim Sampson

FB	15	Keisuke Moriya
RW	14	Akihito Yamada
OC	13	Yasutaka Sasakura
IC	12	Rikiya Matsuda
LW	11	Kenki Fukuoka
FH	10	Berrick Barnes
SH	9	Keisuke Uchida
N8	8	Jack Cornelsen
OF	7	Shunsuke Nunomaki (c)
BF	6	Ben Gunter
RL	5	Daniel Heenan
LL	4	Kotaro Yatabe
TP	3	Shohei Hirano
HK	2	Keita Inagaki
LP	1	Atsushi Sakate
Replacements:
RE	16	Shota Horie
RE	17	Tom Moloney
RE	18	Craig Millar
RE	19	Masaki Tani
RE	20	Iori Kaji
RE	21	Fumiaki Tanaka
RE	22	Takuya Yamasawa
RE	23	Ryuji Noguchi
Coach:
(New Zealand) Robbie Deans

== Country Stockman tour ==
Following the 2018 World Series Rugby season, the Australian Country Stockman Rugby team undertook a two match tour to Perth to play the Western Force and Western Force Under-19 sides.

20 August 2018	Force Under-19	19–36	Stockman Rugby	Wanneroo Rugby Club
7.00 pm AWST (UTC+8)	Try: Tizzano (2) 45' m, 80' c Foster-Hall 49' c Con: J. Hardy (2/3) 46', 80'	Report:	Try: Gibbon (2) 20' c, 32' m Dorrough (3) 24' c, 58' m, 74' c Bulley 27' m Con: Dorrough (3/5) 20', 25', 75'

25 August 2018	Force	76–0	Stockman Rugby	Rockingham Rugby Club
6.00 pm AWST (UTC+8)	Try: Alcock (2) 5' m, 42' c Lee-Warner (2) 26' c, 53' c Uyen (2) 50' c, 62' m, P. Grant 34' c Fines 36' c, H. Orr 57' c B. Grant 71' c, Lloyd 79' c Con: P. Grant (7/9) 27', 35', 43', 46', 51', 54', 58'; Alatimu (2/2) 72', 80'	Report:

Team details

FB	15	Jack Hardy
RW	14	Clay Uyen
OC	13	George Pisi
IC	12	AJ Alatimu
LW	11	Brad Lacey
FH	10	Peter Grant
SH	9	Issak Fines
N8	8	Tobias Hoskins
OF	7	Carlo Tizzano
BF	6	Chris Alcock
RL	5	Fergus Lee-Warner
LL	4	Harrison Orr
TP	3	Kieran Longbottom
HK	2	Harry Scoble
LP	1	Markus Vanzati
Replacements:
RE	16	Feleti Kaitu'u
RE	17	Harry Lloyd
RE	18	Cameron Orr
RE	19	Ben Grant
RE	20	Tevin Ferris
RE	21	Elliot Turner
RE	22	Louie David
RE	23	Sheldon Tarawa
Coach:
(Australia) Tim Sampson

FB	15	Finn Mc Kee
RW	14	Alex Gibbon
OC	13	Landon Hayes
IC	12	Ben Cotton
LW	11	Billy Bulley
FH	10	Fred Durrough
SH	9	Vincent Quigley
N8	8	Marcus Carbone
OF	7	Josateki Murray
BF	6	Luke Papworth
RL	5	Tom Nowlan
LL	4	Marcus Christenson
TP	3	Rhys Brodie
HK	2	Bart Ritchie
LP	1	Oscar Cunningham
Replacements:
RE	16	Dane Le Rougetel
RE	17	Tom Court
RE	18	Cameron McKerrow
RE	19	Rory Collins
RE	20	Andrew Selwood
RE	21	Trent De Vere
RE	22	Jack Radford
RE	23	Zac Campton
RE	24	Paul Mackin
Coach:
(Australia) Guy Shepherdson
