= Tom Varndell =

England international rugby union player (born 1985)

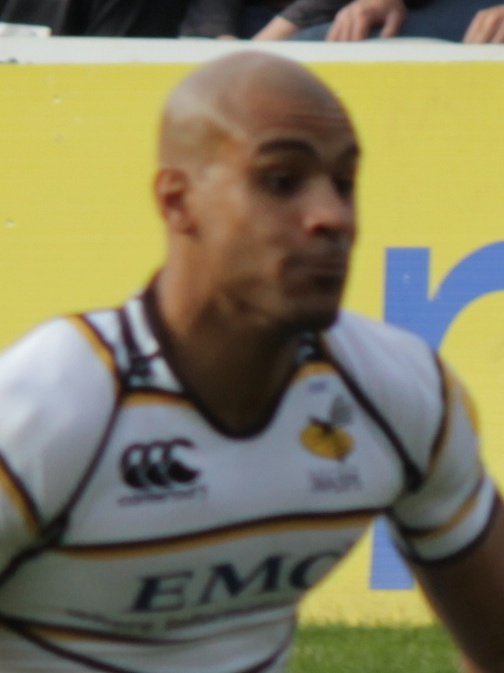
- Varndell in 2012
- Born: Thomas William Varndell; 16 September 1985 (age 41) Ashford, England
- Height: 1.88 m (6 ft 2 in)
- Weight: 101 kg (15 st 13 lb; 223 lb)

Rugby union career
- Position: Wing
- Current team: Bury St Edmunds
Amateur team(s)
Years	Team	Apps	(Points)
- Chinnor
–	Henley		
Senior career
Years	Team	Apps	(Points)
2004–2009	Leicester Tigers	113	(325)
2006	→ Bedford Blues (loan)	2	(10)
2009–2015	Wasps	132	(370)
2015-2018	Bristol Bears	50	(175)
2018	Scarlets	2	
2018	Leicester Tigers		
2019	South China Tigers		
2019–2020	Yorkshire Carnegie	14	(25)
2020–	Bury St Edmunds		
- Correct as of 1 July 2020
International career
Years	Team	Apps	(Points)
2006	England Saxons		
2005–2008	England	4	(15)
- Correct as of 21 March 2015
National sevens team
Years	Team		Comps
2005	England		
Medal record
Men's rugby sevens
Representing England
Commonwealth Games
Silver medal – second place	2006 Melbourne	Team competition

Tom Varndell (born 16 September 1985) is an English rugby union player who plays on the wing as a player-coach for Bury St Edmunds. Varndell also has caps for England and England Sevens, as well as having represented other Premiership Rugby sides Bristol Bears and Wasps. He is the third highest try scorer in Premiership Rugby after Chris Ashton.

== Early career ==
Varndell began playing rugby aged 8 at Chinnor rugby club in Oxfordshire before moving to Henley Hawks, where he stayed until he was 15. He was later invited by Dusty Hare, the former England full back, who was Leicester's Chief Scout, to train with them. He spent two years at the Tigers' den but left to take up a scholarship at Colston's Collegiate School in Bristol.

== Career ==
Varndell returned to the Tigers in 2004, and made a quick impact in the Premiership. In his second appearance with the Tigers senior side, he recorded the fastest hat trick of tries in Premiership history, doing so in a 13-minute span against Worcester. He finished the 2005-06 Guinness Premiership regular season, top of the try list with 14.

Also in 2005, Varndell made his debut for both national teams within one week. On 26 November, he came on as a replacement and scored a try against Manu Samoa at Twickenham in his first full 15-man international. Then, on 1 and 2 December, he made his England Sevens debut in the Dubai Sevens, the first tournament in the 2005–06 World Sevens Series. Varndell was the tournament's leading try scorer as England claimed the title.

In 2006, Varndell was chosen in the England Saxons team for the 6 Nations, but after impressive displays for both Leicester Tigers and England in the Rugby Sevens at the 2006 Commonwealth Games, he was awarded with two starting places on the senior tour to Australia. In the second of these appearances he scored a try in a 43–18 defeat. For the Elite players squad in the 2006/07 England Squad he was subsequently dropped and demoted back to the England Saxons side with new Leicester teammate, Jordan Crane.

In September 2006, Varndell played for Leicester's feeder club, Bedford Blues, and scored a try on his debut against Exeter Chiefs. Varndell ended the season playing as a replacement when Leicester won the 2007 Premiership final.

The start of the 2007/08 season saw Varndell back on the wing in the starting 15 for Leicester's opening games in the Premiership. He scored 18 tries for Leicester during the 32 games he played in the 2007/08 season

In late 2007 his girlfriend Claire gave birth to a son called Taio Varndell.

Start of 2008 saw Varndell selected for the England Saxons squad. He started the first game against the Ireland A team, at Welford Road and scored.

He was selected in the England Saxons side that defeated Ireland A at Welford Road on 1 February 2008, scoring a brace in his first international since the tour to Australia 18 months prior. Saxons coach Steve Bates was keen for him to put pressure on first team selection.

Varndell was selected for the 2008 summer tour to New Zealand and started in the 2nd test against New Zealand in Christchurch, which England lost 44–12. Varndell did, however, score a try for his team which was his third try in four appearances for the senior England squad.

He was named as a member of Martin Johnson's first England elite player squad ready for selection for the 2008-09 international season but was dropped before the start of the 2009 Six Nations.

He has continued to play with success for the England IRB sevens team, and was a try-scoring member of the England Saxons team in this year's (2009) Churchill Cup.

Varndell was a replacement when Leicester won the 2009 Premiership final. Varndell then moved to London Wasps. In his first Wasps season he made: 26 starts, 3 replacement appearances, scoring: 19 tries, with a total of 95 points for Wasps.

He continued his scoring record in the first game of the 2012–13 season playing against reigning champions Harlequins, a game in which he was the first player in the Premiership to have a try disallowed under the new TMO law for an earlier infringement. As of the start of the 2013/14 season, he was the Aviva Premiership's third all-time top try scorer with 75 tries, behind the retired Steve Hanley (78) and the then all-time leader, Sale Sharks wing Mark Cueto (90).

On 7 January 2015, it was announced that Varndell was to move to Bristol, competing in the RFU Championship for the 2015–16 season.

On New Year's Day, 2017, Varndell equalled Mark Cueto's Premiership tries record of 90 tries by scoring against Sale Sharks. This followed a hat-trick in the previous week against Worcester Warriors. On 10 February 2017, Varndell scored for Bristol against Harlequins to surpass Cueto's record. He scored once more for Bristol to finish the 2016-2017 Premiership Rugby season with 92 tries.

In 2018, following a brief stint in Wales with Scarlets, Varndell moved to French second division side Soyaux Angoulême XV Charente on a two-year contract scoring once in a 31–18 loss to Brive. But his move to France was cut short, due to family reasons.

Varndell signed with Leicester Tigers in January 2019. This was his second stint with the club, following his time at the Tigers from 2004 to 2009.

On 6 March 2019, Varndell travelled to Hong Kong to play for South China Tigers as part of the Global Rapid Rugby series. He returned to England to sign a one-year contract with Yorkshire Carnegie in the RFU Championship for the 2019–20 season.

On 15 May 2020, Varndell signed a contract to join Bury St Edmunds Rugby Club for the season 2020/2021 as player/coach. The move was negotiated by Terry Sands of Samurai, sports apparel manufacturer, who said:"He always has time for people and it will be all about what some of our players aspirations are, as they will be able to speak to him and soak up all his knowledge and experience." He added: "It is fantastic for the club and it is fantastic for our supporters, including all of our volunteers and sponsors that have supported the club over the years."
