= Brett Wilkinson =

South African rugby union player

- Born: 29 November 1983 (age 42) Grahamstown, South Africa
- Height: 1.83 m (6 ft 0 in)
- School: Kingswood College
- University: University of Cape Town

Rugby union career
- Position: Loosehead prop
Amateur team(s)
Years	Team	Apps	(Points)
2006–2014	Galwegians		
Senior career
Years	Team	Apps	(Points)
2006–2014	Connacht	183	(10)
- Correct as of 18 January 2014
International career
Years	Team	Apps	(Points)
2009–2012	Ireland Wolfhounds	5	(5)
- Correct as of 28 January 2012
Coaching career
- Years: Team
- 2015–2017: Buccaneers
- 2017–2018: Hong Kong Cricket
- 2018–: HKU Sandy Bay
- 2018–: Hong Kong (scrum coach)
- 2019–: South China Tigers (scrum coach)

Brett Wilkinson (born 29 November 1983) is a South African born rugby union coach and former player. He is currently scrum coach at Ealing Trailfinders. Previously, he was head coach for HKU Sandy Bay in the Hong Kong Premiership and scrum coach for the Hong Kong national team and Global Rapid Rugby side the South China Tigers. He coached at Brunel University for one year between 2021 and 2022 before being promoted to Ealing Trailfinders scrum coach.

During his playing career, he played as a prop. From 2006 until 2014, when he was forced to retire due to injury, Wilkinson played for Irish provincial side Connacht, and also represented Ireland at international 'A' level after qualifying on residency. After retiring from playing, he started his coaching career in Ireland, becoming head coach of All-Ireland League side Buccaneers.

== Playing career ==
=== Schools ===
Wilkinson attended Kingswood College in Grahamstown, playing for the school's senior rugby team. He came to prominence while playing for the University of Cape Town, and after a successful season in 2005 received a number of offers but chose to move to Europe and play for Irish side Connacht.

=== Connacht ===
Wilkinson joined Connacht for the 2006–07 season, and made his debut on 1 September 2006 in an away victory over Scottish side Border Reivers in the Celtic League, playing the full 80 minutes in a Connacht victory. He made his first European appearance for Connacht on 20 October 2006 against Harlequins in the 2006–07 European Challenge Cup coming on as a replacement. Wilkinson played in a total of 18 Celtic League matches in his first season, 16 of these coming as starts, and also played in five Challenge Cup matches. In the following season, Wilkinson continued to play regularly for the side. With the number of teams reduced to 10 for the 2007–08 Celtic League, Wilkinson featured in all 18 of Connacht's matches, with only one of these appearances coming as a replacement. As well as his appearances in the Celtic League, Wilkinson started all six of Connacht's games in the Challenge Cup.

Wilkinson held on to his spot in the starting team over the following seasons, playing in 15 games in the 2008–09 Celtic League and six of the side's games as they reached the quarter-finals of the 2008–09 European Challenge Cup. In the 2009–10 season, he played in 16 Celtic League games, and featured regularly for the province as they made the semi-finals of the Challenge Cup. Wilkinson played in the semi-final as Connacht were narrowly beaten in the Sporstground by Toulon. In October 2010 Wilkinson earned his 100th cap for Connacht. With the number of teams having been expanded to 12, he played in 20 games in the 2010–11 Celtic League under new coach Eric Elwood. Wilkinson also started five games in the Challenge Cup that season.

The following season saw Wilkinson make 18 appearances in the Pro12, the new name given to the league, starting in 15 of the matches. That season also saw Connacht qualify for their first ever Heineken Cup, and Wilkinson played his first ever match at the highest level of European rugby away against Harlequins at the Stoop. He went on to start every one of Connacht's pool matches, including their first ever Heineken Cup win in the return match against Harlequins at the Sportsground. In the 2012–13 season, Wilkinson played 18 games in the Pro12. Connacht again qualified for the Heineken Cup, with Wilkinson starting in three of the province's six matches, and featuring as a replacement in another two.

In 2013–14 Wilkinson started out the season playing regularly. Out of Connacht's first 12 matches in the Pro12, he started 10 and made a substitute appearance in another. Wilkinson also started all six of Connacht's games in the 2013–14 Heineken Cup, including a victory over four-time Heineken Cup winners Toulouse. In Connacht's final match of the pool stages away to Saracens, Wilkinson was forced to leave the field and be replaced due to injury. On 26 March 2014, it was announced that Wilkinson was retiring from rugby due to a neck ligament injury sustained against Saracens, having played for Connacht 183 times.

=== International ===
Although born in South Africa, Wilkinson qualified to play for Ireland through the three-year residency rule. Wilkinson was called to train with the Ireland squad in 2009. He was also called up to the senior Ireland squad for the tour of New Zealand in 2012. Wilkinson made five appearances for Ireland's second tier side, now known as Ireland Wolfhounds, scoring a try against Tonga in 2009.

== Coaching career ==
=== Buccaneers ===
In 2015, Wilkinson became head coach of the Connacht branch All-Ireland League side Buccaneers. In his first season in charge, he guided the Division 1B side to the promotion play-offs. The team also won the Connacht Senior League title for the first time since 2007. The team did even better in Wilkinson's second season, winning a League and Cup double in Connacht, as well claiming the 2016–17 Division 1B title, earning the Buccaneers promotion to the top flight of club rugby in Ireland for the first time in a decade.

=== Move to Hong Kong ===
In June 2017, it was announced that Wilkinson would depart Buccaneers, having taken an offer of a coaching role with Hong Kong Premiership side Hong Kong Cricket. The move saw him link up with former Connacht teammate and fellow South African, Dylan Rogers. Wilkinson's first season with the team saw them struggle, winning only one game all season. In May 2018, the rugby section from Hong Kong cricket club, including Wilkinson, moved en masse to join with the Hong Kong University and Sandy Bay RFC which had been a mini and youth rugby club only up to that point, forming a new senior club, Hong Kong University Sandy Bay RFC. Following a tough start to the first season for this new senior team, where they won only two games before Christmas, they turned it around in the second half of the season. Wilkinson's charges won five games in a row, all with bonus points, to make the playoffs and from there ultimately won the Grand Championship in the new side's first season.

In addition to serving as head coach of Sandy Bay, Wilkinson's time in Hong Kong has seen him become assistant coach to other teams. He serves as scrum coach to the Hong Kong national side and to the South China Tigers in the Global Rapid Rugby competition.
