= Manuma Samoa =

- Union: Samoa Rugby Union
- Founded: 2019 (Kagifa Samoa); 2020 (Manuma Samoa)
- Ground: Apia Park (Cap: 12,000)
- Coach: Brian Lima
- Captain: Patrick Fa’apale
- League: Global Rapid Rugby

Union website
- www.manusamoa.com

Manuma Samoa was a professional rugby union team based in Samoa that played in the Global Rapid Rugby competition. Founded in 2019 as Kagifa Samoa, the team was backed by the Samoa Rugby Union.

== Name and logo ==
Manuma, in Samoan, refers to the many-colored fruit dove (Ptilinopus perousii), a small dove found in that country. The team logo includes the head of a manuma bird in profile beneath the Southern Cross in white on a blue background.

== History ==
Kagifa logo 2019

=== Kagifa Samoa ===
The Kagifa Samoa team was established in 2019 and competed in the Pacific Showcase series during the inaugural year of Global Rapid Rugby. In Samoan colloquial speech, a kagifa refers to an enormous wild fish or shark that wreaked havoc in Polynesian mythical legend, and which is more formally referred to as tanifa.

The team was backed by Pacific Sports International in partnership with the Samoa Rugby Union. The 2019 squad included Samoan-based players, Tongans, Fijians and New Zealanders as well as Samoan-eligible players based in Australia and New Zealand.

=== Manuma Samoa ===
The team was renamed Manuma Samoa with the backing of the Samoa Rugby Union for the 2020 Rapid Rugby season.

== Home field ==
Manuma Samoa played home games at Apia Park Stadium. Due to construction at Apia Park in 2019 for the Pacific Games, the team's home matches for the Rapid Rugby Pacific Showcase were moved to Pukekohe Stadium in Auckland and Ballymore Stadium in Brisbane.

== Squad ==
The Manuma squad for the 2020 Global Rapid Rugby season:

Manuma Samoa – 2020 Global Rapid Rugby (Note: Initial squad was named in November 2019.)
| Hooker: (Samoa) **Afa Aiono**; (Samoa) Jenny Taateo; (Samoa) Frank Tupuola; Prop: (Samoa) Steve Eliu; (Samoa) Malaefono Gaupule; (Samoa) Saini Iese; (Samoa) Alo Mauinatu; (Samoa) Sapani Penaia; (Samoa) Noel Sanft; (Samoa) Alofaaga Sao; (Samoa) Frank Sio; (Samoa) Siliva Tapu; (Samoa) Brook Toomalatai; Lock: (Samoa) Miracle Faiilagi; (Samoa) Ioelu Kitiona; (Samoa) Theodore McFarland; (Samoa) Kerisimasi Tiumalu; (Samoa) Steve Tuiuli; (Samoa) Aukusitino Ulugia; Backrow: (Samoa) Nissan Aitui; (Samoa) Joe Faleafaga; (Samoa) Pao Lauama; (Samoa) **Iakopo Mapu**; (Samoa) Anzac Pago; (Samoa) Tusi Tavita; (Samoa) Elia Tolufale; (Samoa) Tufa Seiuli; (Samoa) Setu Sikoti; (Samoa) Liahona Vaegaau | Scrum-half: (Samoa) Pupi Ah See; (Samoa) **Melani Matavao**; (Samoa) Collin Palamo; (Samoa) Dave Puleiala; (Samoa) Ionatana Tino; (Samoa) Vaimoli Toniga; First five: (Samoa) Alosio Afa; (Samoa) **Patrick Fa’apale** (c); (Samoa) Joyner Key; (Samoa) Jordan Muese; Centre: (Samoa) Ueta Avaoletuna; (Samoa) **Malu Fagalele**; (Samoa) Faleniu Iosi; (Samoa) Samu Iosua; (Samoa) Chris Leota; (Samoa) Faaaliliu Mitivao; (Samoa) Johnny Samuelu; (Samoa) Frank Tato; (Samoa) Manuia Tiumalu; (Samoa) Sooalofaina Tamilo; (Samoa) Tulolo Tulolo; Wing: (Samoa) Ivana Eli; (Samoa) Mathew Evile; (Samoa) Filimoni Filimoni; (Samoa) Dennis Maresa; (Samoa) Larry Mitivao; (Samoa) Papu Wulf; Fullback: (Samoa) **Malu Falaniko**; (Samoa) Henry Wulf |
Notes:
**Bold** denotes player is internationally capped. (c) Denotes team captain. ^{1} denotes marquee player.

== Records ==
=== Season standings ===
Global Rapid Rugby

| Year | Pos | Pld | W | D | L | PF | PA | +/− | BP | Pts | Play-offs |
|---|---|---|---|---|---|---|---|---|---|---|---|
| 2019 ^{*} | 3rd | 4 | 0 | 0 | 4 | 96 | 184 | −288 | 3 | 3 | —N/a |

Notes:

^* 2019 Rapid Rugby matches in the Pacific showcase.

=== Head coaches ===
- Darryl Suasua (2019)
- Brian Lima (2020)

=== Captains ===
- Leon Fukofuka (2019)
- Patrick Fa’apale (2020)

== See also ==
- Rugby union in Samoa
