= Tevin Ferris =

Australian rugby union player

- Born: Tevin Ferris; 24 July 1996 (age 30) Hamilton, New Zealand
- Height: 185 cm (6 ft 1 in)
- Weight: 106 kg (234 lb; 16 st 10 lb)

Rugby union career
- Position: Flanker
- Current team: Skyactivs Hiroshima
Senior career
Years	Team	Apps	(Points)
2017	Perth Spirit	8	(10)
2018–2022	Force	16	(10)
2022–	Skyactivs Hiroshima	45	(30)
- Correct as of 15 June 2020
Super Rugby
Years	Team	Apps	(Points)
2020	Force		
- Correct as of 15 June 2020

Tevin Ferris (born 24 July 1996 in New Zealand) is a New Zealand born, Australian rugby union player who plays for the Force in Global Rapid Rugby and the Super Rugby AU competition. His original playing position is flanker. He was named in the Force squad for the Global Rapid Rugby competition in 2020.
