= Jeremy Thrush =

- Born: Jeremy Thrush; 19 April 1985 (age 41) Auckland, Auckland Region, New Zealand
- Height: 1.98 m (6 ft 6 in)
- Weight: 118 kg (18 st 8 lb)
- School: Hutt Valley High School
- Notable relative(s): Jayden Thrush, Josh Lord, William Deihl

Rugby union career
- Position: Lock
Amateur team(s)
Years	Team	Apps	(Points)
- Hutt Old Boys Marist
Senior career
Years	Team	Apps	(Points)
2015–2018	Gloucester	58	(35)
2019	Force	8	
Provincial / State sides
Years	Team	Apps	(Points)
2006–2015	Wellington	87	(120)
- Correct as of 23 October 2015
Super Rugby
Years	Team	Apps	(Points)
2008–2015	Hurricanes	110	(50)
2020-	Force	32	(10)
- Correct as of 26 Feb 2023
International career
Years	Team	Apps	(Points)
2013–2015	New Zealand	11	(10)
- Correct as of 17 November 2014

Jeremy Thrush (born 19 April 1985) is a rugby union lock who plays for the Western Force. He previously played for Hurricanes in Super Rugby and Wellington Lions in the ITM Cup. He represented the Junior All Blacks, New Zealand Under-19 and New Zealand Secondary Schools teams. He was a part of the victorious 2004 Under-19 World Championship team and was named the 2004 IRB World U19 Player of the Year.

Thrush made his debut as a replacement in the 68th minute of the All Blacks' second test against France in the 2013 Steinlager Series. On 13 January 2015, it was announced that Thrush would be joining Aviva Premiership side Gloucester after the 2015 Rugby World Cup.

On 10 May 2018, Thrush returned to the southern hemisphere in Australia to sign for Western Force as part of the Global Rapid Rugby competition and recently played for them in Super Rugby AU and Super Rugby Pacific.

In 2022 Western force announced that Thrush as well as two of his teammates would be retiring at the end of the season. After his retirement Thrush began to coach for the Western Force Fortescue Academy using his skills he retained in his years playing, claiming he had known coaching was in his cards for a long time.

The next year in 2023 Thrush returned to Western Force after coach Simon Cron called him in. Unfortunately, this marked the official end of his career since he suffered a heel injury during the match.
