= Tom Sheminant =

Australian rugby union player

- Born: Tom Sheminant; 11 March 1996 (age 30) Perth, Australia
- Height: 182 cm (6 ft 0 in)
- Weight: 117 kg (258 lb; 18 st 6 lb)

Rugby union career
- Position: Prop
Senior career
Years	Team	Apps	(Points)
2016	Perth Spirit	2	(0)
2018–	Force	7	(5)
- Correct as of 15 June 2020
Super Rugby
Years	Team	Apps	(Points)
2020–	Force		
- Correct as of 15 June 2020

Tom Sheminant (born 11 March 1996 in Australia) is an Australian rugby union player who plays for the Force in Global Rapid Rugby and the Super Rugby AU competition. His original playing position is prop. He was named in the Force squad for the Global Rapid Rugby competition in 2020.
