= Mosese Voka =

Fijian rugby player (born 1985)

- Born: Mosese Voka; 7 June 1985 (age 41) Naibalebale, Viwa, Yasawa
- Height: 6 ft 4 in (193 cm)
- Weight: 16 st 3 lb (227 lb; 103 kg)
- School: Lelean Memorial School; St Thomas High School

Rugby union career
- Position: Back row
- Current team: Fijian Latui
Senior career
Years	Team	Apps	(Points)
2017–2018	Fijian Drua	16	(10)
2019	Fijian Latui		
- Correct as of 7 September 2019
International career
Years	Team	Apps	(Points)
2016–	Fiji	8	(0)
- Correct as of 7 September 2019

Mosese Voka (born 7 June 1985) is a Fijian rugby player for Fijian Latui in Global Rapid Rugby and the Fijian national team. His primary position is back row.

In August 2019 he was named in Fiji's squad for the 2019 Rugby World Cup.
