= Michael Oakman-Hunt =

Australian rugby union player (born 1993)

- Born: 5 March 1993 (age 33) Australia
- Height: 189 cm (6 ft 2 in)
- Weight: 102 kg (16 st 1 lb; 225 lb)

Rugby union career
- Position: Flanker
Senior career
| Years | Team | Apps | (Points) |
| 2015– | Canberra Vikings | 5 | (0) |
Super Rugby
| Years | Team | Apps | (Points) |
| 2018– | Brumbies | 0 | (0) |

Michael Oakman-Hunt (born 5 March 1993) is an Australian rugby union player who plays for the Brumbies in the Super Rugby competition. His position of choice is flanker.
