= South China Tigers =

Hong Kong rugby union team

- Union: Hong Kong Rugby Union
- Founded: 2018; 8 years ago
- Disbanded: 2020; 6 years ago
- Location: Hong Kong
- Ground(s): (Cap: 40,000) Hong Kong Stadium (Cap: 11,981) Siu Sai Wan (Cap: 9,000) Aberdeen Stadium
- Coach(es): (Head coach) Craig Hammond (Team manager) Andrew Hall
- Captain: Liam Slatem
- League: Global Rapid Rugby

The South China Tigers was a professional rugby union team from Hong Kong that played in the Global Rapid Rugby competition.

The team was launched in 2018 to participate in the inaugural Global Rapid Rugby season.

For the naming of the team, South China tigers are considered as the most distinctive of all tiger subspecies. The population once numbered more than 4,000 in the wild, distributed from Hunan, Jiangxi in the north to as far south as Hong Kong.

== History ==
The inaugural Global Rapid Rugby season was played as a showcase series in 2019, with the South China Tigers playing four matches in the Asia Showcase. In the first Rapid Rugby match, Glyn Hughes scored the Tigers' first try in the ninth minute against the Western Force in Perth on 29 March 2019. The team secured their first Rapid Rugby victory a month later in a home match against the Asia Pacific Dragons, winning 29–19 at the Aberdeen Sports Ground.

== Players and personnel ==
=== Squad ===
The squad for the 2020 season included:

South China Tigers – 2020 Global Rapid Rugby (Note: There were 47 players included in the initial squad at the start of the 2020 season.)
Hooker: (Hong Kong) **Dayne Jans**; (Hong Kong) **Alexander Post**; (Hong Kong) Callum Tam; (Hong Kong) **Jamie Tsang**; Prop: (Hong Kong) **Mitchell Andrews**; (Hong Kong) **Daniel Barlow**; (Hong Kong) **Thomas Bristow**; (Hong Kong) **Keelan Chapman**; (Hong Kong) **Ben Higgins**; (Hong Kong) **Tau Koloamatangi**; (Hong Kong) **Callum McFeat Smith**; (Hong Kong) **Jack Parfitt**; (Hong Kong) **Faizal Solomona Penesa**; (Hong Kong) **Campbell Wakely**; Lock: (Hong Kong) **Fin Field**; (Hong Kong) Patrick Jenkinson; (Hong Kong) **Craig Lodge**; (Hong Kong) **Mark Prior**; (Hong Kong) **Kyle Sullivan**; Backrow: (Hong Kong) **Kane Boucaut**; (Hong Kong) **James Cunningham**; (Hong Kong) **Josh Dowsing** (c); (Hong Kong) **Joshua Hrstich**; (Hong Kong) Callum McCullough; (Hong Kong) **Michael Parfitt**; (Hong Kong) **Cris Pierrepont**; (Wales) James Sawyer; (Hong Kong) **Sam Tsoi**; (Namibia) Luke van der Smit	Scrum-half: (South Africa) Ruan Du Plooy; (Hong Kong) **Bryn Phillips**; (Hong Kong) **Liam Slatem** (c); Fly-half: (England) Glyn Hughes; (Hong Kong) **Gregor McNeish**; (Hong Kong) **Matthew Rosslee**; Centre: (Hong Kong) **Ben Axten-Burrett**; (New Zealand) Mike Green; (Hong Kong) **Conor Hartley**; (Australia) Tom Hill; (Hong Kong) **Guy Spanton**; (Hong Kong) **Tyler Spitz**; (Hong Kong) **Lewis Warner**; Wing: (Hong Kong) **Harry Sayers**; (England) George Watkins; Fullback: (New Zealand) Nathan De Theirry; (New Zealand) Whiia Meltzer; (England) Sean Taylor; Notes:
**Bold** denotes player is internationally capped. (c) Denotes team captain. ^{1} denotes marquee player.

=== Staff ===
Appointments for the 2019 season:

Name	Position
Craig Hammond	Head coach
Scott Sneddon	Assistant Coach
Sam Hocking	Assistant Coach
Brett Wilkinson	Assistant Coach
Andrew Hall	Team Manager

== Records ==
=== Season standings ===
Global Rapid Rugby

Year	Pos	Pld	W	D	L	PF	PA	+/−	BP	Pts	Play-offs
2019 ^{*}	3rd	4	1	0	3	93	145	−52	2	6	—N/a

Notes:

^* 2019 Rapid Rugby matches in the Asia showcase.

=== Head coaches ===
- Craig Hammond (2019–2020)

=== Captains ===
- Liam Slatem and James Cunningham (2019)
- Liam Slatem and Josh Dowsing (2020)

== See also ==
- Rugby union in Hong Kong
- Hong Kong national rugby union team
