= Luke van der Smit =

Namibian rugby union player

- Full name: Luke-Kyle van der Smit
- Born: 29 June 1994 (age 32) Swakopmund, Namibia
- Height: 1.84 m (6 ft 1/2 in)
- Weight: 110 kg (240 lb; 17 st 5 lb)
- School: South African College Schools, Cape Town
- University: University of Pretoria

Rugby union career
- Position: Flanker
- Current team: Valley Fort RFC
Youth career
- 2013–2015: Western Province
Senior career
Years	Team	Apps	(Points)
2015	Western Province	4	(5)
2016	UP Tuks	4	(16)
2016	Eastern Province Kings	6	(0)
2018-2022	HKU Sandy Bay RFC	33	(50)
2019-2020	South China Tigers	4	(10)
2022-	Valley RFC	17	(40)
- Correct as of 4 April 2024
International career
Years	Team	Apps	(Points)
2021-	Hong Kong	9	(15)
- Correct as of 4 April 2024

Luke-Kyle van der Smit (born 29 June 1994) is a Namibian born professional rugby union player for Valley RFC in Hong Kong, having previously played for Western Province in 2015 and the Eastern Province Kings in 2016. His regular position is flanker.

== Rugby career ==
=== 2013–2015: Western Province ===
Van der Smit was born in Swakopmund in Namibia, but grew up in Cape Town, South Africa. He attended SACS, also playing first team rugby for them.

Van der Smit didn't earn provincial colours at school level, but was contracted to join Western Province's academy after high school. He played in all twelve of Western Province U19's matches during the 2013 Under-19 Provincial Championship, starting eleven of those. He scored tries in victories over Border U19 and Leopards U19, but could not help his side reach the play-offs, as they finished fifth on the log.

Van der Smit was included in Western Province's squad for the 2015 Vodacom Cup and he made his first class debut on 21 March 2015 against Western Cape rivals Boland Cavaliers in Caledon, coming on for the final couple of minutes of the match. He also played off the bench against the Sharks XV the next week, and made his first start against the Border Bulldogs three weeks later, also scoring the first senior try of his career in a 34–6 win. He made one more appearance off the bench against the Free State XV as Western Province finished top of the Southern Section to qualify for the quarter-finals. Van der Smit wasn't named in the team that won their matches at the quarter-final and semi-final stage, and was an unused replacement for the final, with his team losing the match 7–24 to the Pumas.

Van der Smit made two starts and five appearances as a replacement for Western Province U21 in the 2015 Under-21 Provincial Championship and scored a single try against Free State U21. He didn't feature in the play-offs, which Western Province won, beating the same opposition in the final.

=== 2016: UP Tuks ===
Van der Smit played in the 2016 Varsity Cup for the UP Tuks. He made one start and three appearances as a replacement, scoring tries in matches against CUT Ixias – in a man-of-the-match performance – and NMMU Madibaz within a period of three days to help UP Tuks secure the final semi-final spot, and also featured in their semi-final defeat to Maties.

=== 2016: Eastern Province Kings ===
Van Der Smit was contracted by the Port Elizabeth-based Eastern Province Kings for the 2016 Currie Cup Premier Division. He made his Currie Cup debut in his new side's 35–49 defeat to the Blue Bulls. He made a total of six appearances for the team, but could not prevent them losing all their matches to finish bottom of the log.
