= Kieran Longbottom =

Australian rugby union player

- Born: Kieran Longbottom; 20 December 1985 (age 40) Perth, Western Australia, Australia
- Height: 1.81 m (5 ft 11 1/2 in)
- Weight: 118 kg (18 st 8 lb)

Rugby union career
- Position: Prop
Senior career
Years	Team	Apps	(Points)
2014–2016	Saracens	6	(0)
2016–2017	Sale Sharks	20	(5)
2017–	Saracens		
2018–	Western Force		
- Correct as of 6 June 2017
Super Rugby
Years	Team	Apps	(Points)
2008–2014, 2020–	Western Force	59	(0)
- Correct as of 18 July 2020

Kieran Longbottom (born 20 December 1985) is an Australian rugby union footballer. His regular playing position is prop. He previously played for the Western Force in Super Rugby. He made his debut during the 2008 Super 14 season against the Chiefs in Perth. On 24 June 2014, Longbottom left Australia to join Saracens in the English Aviva Premiership.
