= Masivesi Dakuwaqa =

Fijian rugby footballer

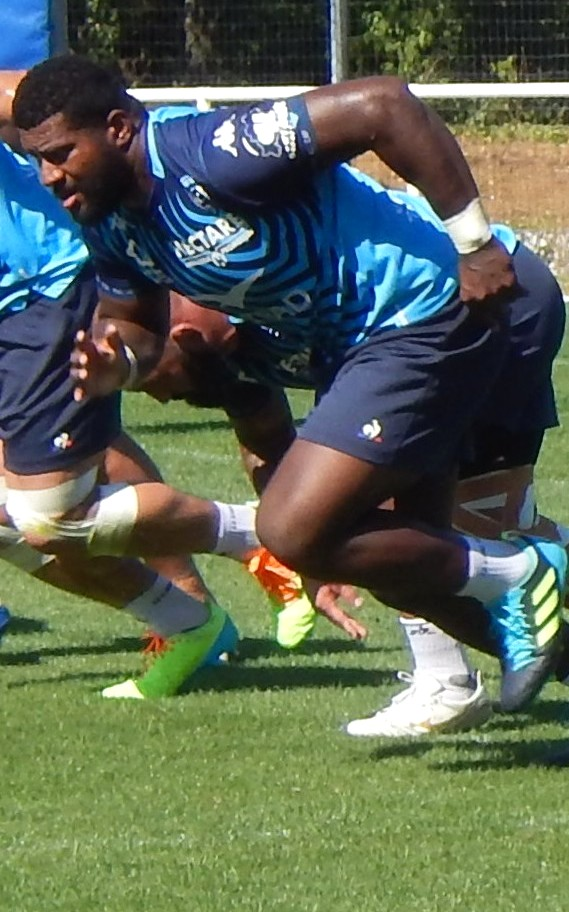

Personal information
- Born: 14 February 1994 (age 32) Nadi, Fiji
- Height: 1.90 m (6 ft 3 in)
- Weight: 105 kg (16 st 7 lb; 231 lb)

Playing information

Rugby union
- Position: Wing, centre, Flanker, Number 8, Lock
Representative
Years	Team	Pld	T	G	FG	P
2016–17	Fiji sevens	49	15	0	0	75

Rugby league
- Position: Lock, Second-row, Prop, Centre
Club
Years	Team	Pld	T	G	FG	P
2017–	Canberra Raiders	0	0	0	0	0
- As of 8 May 2017
Medals
Men's rugby sevens
Representing Fiji
Olympic Games
Gold medal – first place	2016 Rio de Janeiro	Team competition

Masivesi Dakuwaqa (born 14 February 1994) is a Fijian rugby footballer. Dakuwaqa formerly played rugby sevens for Fiji, including at the 2016 Summer Olympics and rugby league for the Canberra Raiders (Reserve grade) in the National Rugby League. He represented Biarritz in the French D2 but was fired after a biting incident involving teammate Pierre Pàges which required 20 stitches. He was arrested by the police and appeared in court in May 2025. He was signed by Nationale 1 side CA Périgueux as a medical joker.

== Rugby union ==
Dakuwaqa was born and raised in Wainibuku hart then moved to Nadi district, Fiji and he started his career playing rugby in the local 7's competition on Secala brothers. He played for the Tokatoka Westfield Dragons 7's Team. which is a Saunaka, Nadi-based rugby side that has bred a number of key rugby players for the island nation of Fiji. and Dakuwaqa was selected by Ben Ryan in 2015 to represent the Fiji sevens side, making his debut in the 2016 USA Sevens. Dakuwaqa returned to rugby union in 2019 playing for Western Force and then signed for Toulon prior to the 2019/20 season.

== Rugby league ==
In May 2017 it was announced Dakuwaqa had switched codes to rugby league where he had signed to the Canberra Raiders in the National Rugby League.

== Trivia ==
He is noted for being blind in his left eye after an injury related to a rubber band when he was in primary school. Since Joining Toulon and later Montpellier and then Biarritz, he has played in both lock positions, all 3 backrow positions, on both wings and in both midfield positions.
