= Harry Lloyd (rugby union) =

Australian rugby union player

- Born: 17 January 1995 (age 31) Australia
- Height: 185 cm (6 ft 1 in)
- Weight: 110 kg (240 lb; 17 st 5 lb)

Rugby union career
- Position: Prop
Senior career
Years	Team	Apps	(Points)
2017	Canberra Vikings	10	(20)
2018–2019	Western Force	16	(10)
2021	→ Edinburgh Rugby (loan)	0	(0)
- Correct as of 31 May 2022
Super Rugby
Years	Team	Apps	(Points)
2020–2021	Brumbies	17	(0)
2022	Western Force	8	(5)
2024	Waratahs	1	(0)
- Correct as of 25 May 2024

Harrison Lloyd (born 17 January 1995 in Australia) is a retired Australian rugby union player who most recently played for the Waratahs in Super Rugby.

His playing position is prop.
