= Fergus Lee-Warner =

Australian rugby union player

- Born: Fergus Lee-Warner; 3 February 1994 (age 32) Scone, New South Wales, Australia
- Height: 198 cm (6 ft 6 in)
- Weight: 112 kg (247 lb; 17 st 9 lb)

Rugby union career
- Position: Lock / Flanker
- Current team: Newcastle Red Bulls
Senior career
Years	Team	Apps	(Points)
2017	Greater Sydney Rams	7	(0)
2018–2022	Force	49	(15)
2022	Worcester Warriors	3	(0)
2022–2023	Bath	26	(0)
2025–	Newcastle Red Bulls	0	(0)
- Correct as of 3 October 2022
Super Rugby
Years	Team	Apps	(Points)
2020–2022	Force	36	(25)
2024-2025	Waratahs	16	(0)
- Correct as of 31 May 2025

Fergus Lee-Warner (born 3 February 1994, in Australia) is an Australian rugby union player who plays for the Newcastle Red Bulls in English Premiership Rugby competition. His original playing position is lock or flanker. He was named in the Force squad for the Global Rapid Rugby competition in 2020.

On 4 April 2022 it was announced that Fergus had signed for Worcester Warriors on a 3 year contract to play in the Gallagher Premiership starting with the 2022/23 season.

On 5 October 2022 all Worcester players had their contracts terminated due to the liquidation of the company to which they were contracted. However, Lee-Warner had previously signed a loan deal with Bath. In October 2022, it was confirmed that he would remain at Bath until the end of the 2022–23 season.
