= Rodney Davies =

Australia international rugby union & league player

Rod Davies
Personal information
- Born: Rodney Davies; 18 May 1989 (age 37) Rockhampton, Queensland
- Education: Ipswich Grammar School
- Height: 1.80 m (5 ft 11 in)
- Weight: 90 kg (14 st 2 lb)
- Rugby league career

Playing information
- Position: Fullback
Club
Years	Team	Pld	T	G	FG	P
2007–08	Brisbane Broncos

Sport

Rugby union career
- Position: Fullback
- Current team: Biarritz
Senior career
Years	Team	Apps	(Points)
2014–2016	Biarritz	50	(100)
2016−2017	Mitsubishi DynaBoars	6	(15)
2018−	Western Force	0	(0)
- Correct as of 8 March 2018
Super Rugby
Years	Team	Apps	(Points)
2009–2014	Reds	58	(95)
International career
Years	Team	Apps	(Points)
2011	Australia	1	(0)
2009	Australia U20	5	(25)
National sevens team
Years	Team		Comps
2019	Australia 7s		1
- Correct as of 9 March 2019

Rodney Davies (born 18 May 1989) is an Australian international rugby union footballer who plays for the Western Force. He previously played six seasons for the Queensland Reds in the Super Rugby competition. Davies has represented Australia in both fifteen-a-side and seven-a-side rugby. He is also a former rugby league footballer.

== Early life ==
Davies attended Ipswich Grammar School, the same school former Reds teammate Berrick Barnes attended. Davies can run 100m in 10.8 seconds. In 2006 he toured New Zealand and Fiji with the Australian Schoolboys.

As an 18-year-old, he said he preferred to play full-back in union, yet expected to play wing in rugby league. In 2007, his first senior year of rugby league, Davies topped his team's try-scoring list in the Queensland Cup.

== Rugby union career ==
In 2009 Davies commenced his rugby union career with the Queensland Reds. On 28 March 2009, he made his Super Rugby debut against the Chiefs. In July 2011, during the Super Rugby semi final, Davies became the first Red to score 3 tries in a match in Super Rugby.

Davies signed with French club Biarritz Olympique in June 2014, playing two seasons. He played for Mitsubishi DynaBoars in 2017, before joining the Western Force in 2018.

=== International ===
In October, 2010, he was in contention for a place in the Wallabies 30-man squad to tour Hong Kong and Europe. This was despite a five-month break without a match up until October, and competition from within the Wallabies squad from outside backs Drew Mitchell and Lachie Turner, James O'Connor and Kurtley Beale. On 17 July 2011, Davies made his Wallabies debut against Samoa.

Davies was selected in the Australia 7s team in 2019 and made his debut at the Canada Sevens tournament in Vancouver.
