= Leon Power =

- Born: Leon Power; 27 February 1986 (age 40) Sydney, Australia
- Height: 2.01 m (6 ft 7 in)
- Weight: 117 kg (18 st 6 lb)
- School: Francis Douglas Memorial College

Rugby union career
- Position: Lock
Senior career
Years	Team	Apps	(Points)
2014–16	Oyonnax	47	(0)
- Correct as of 6 August 2016
Provincial / State sides
Years	Team	Apps	(Points)
2007–10	Taranaki	23	(5)
2011–12	Bay of Plenty	18	(5)
2016−	Taranaki	5	(0)
Super Rugby
Years	Team	Apps	(Points)
2012–14	Brumbies	20	(5)
- Correct as of 27 July 2014

Leon Power (born 27 February 1986 in Sydney, Australia) is an Australian rugby union player. He plays in the lock position for Bay of Plenty and Super Rugby franchise, the Brumbies.
