= Chris Heiberg =

South African rugby union player (born 1985)

- Full name: Chris Heiberg
- Born: 1 June 1985 (age 41) Cape Town, Western Cape, South Africa
- Height: 1.83 m (6 ft 0 in)
- Weight: 115 kg (254 lb; 18 st 2 lb)
- School: Wynberg Boys' High School
- University: ETA

Rugby union career
- Position: Prop
- Current team: Force
Amateur team(s)
Years	Team	Apps	(Points)
2010	UCT Ikey Tigers	9	(0)
Senior career
Years	Team	Apps	(Points)
2013	Western Province	7	(0)
2013	Stormers	0	(0)
2014–2016	Force	23	(0)
2014–2015	Perth Spirit	13	(5)
2017	Southern Kings	7	(0)
2017	Eastern Province Kings	5	(5)
2018–present	Force	0	(0)
- Correct as of 22 April 2018

Chris Heiberg (born 1 June 1985) is a South African rugby union player, playing with Australian side the Force. His regular position is prop.

== Career ==
He spent his career playing for university club side UCT Ikey Tigers - including playing in the 2010 Varsity Cup competition.

In 2013, he was included in the Western Province Vodacom Cup team, where he made his debut against the Sharks XV. He played a further six games in that season and in May 2013, he was called into the Stormers team for the 2013 Super Rugby season.

He joined Australian Super Rugby side the Force on a three-year deal before the 2014 Super Rugby season.

== Super Rugby Statistics ==
As of 25 July 2016

Season	Team	Games	Starts	Sub	Mins	Tries	Cons	Pens	Drops	Points	Yel	Red
2014	Force	0	0	0	0	0	0	0	0	0	0	0
2015	Force	14	1	13	219	0	0	0	0	0	1	0
2016	Force	9	0	9	89	0	0	0	0	0	0	0
Total		23	1	22	298	0	0	0	0	0	1	0
