= Issak Fines-Leleiwasa =

Australian rugby union player

- Born: 2 October 1995 (age 31) Sydney, Australia
- Height: 173 cm (5 ft 8 in)
- Weight: 81 kg (179 lb; 12 st 11 lb)

Rugby union career
- Position: Scrum-half
- Current team: Fijian Drua
Senior career
Years	Team	Apps	(Points)
2016	Queensland Country	5	(0)
2017	Brisbane City	4	(0)
2018–	Western Force	15	(10)
- Correct as of 4 November 2019
Super Rugby
Years	Team	Apps	(Points)
2020–21	Brumbies	11	(15)
2021–2025	Western Force	45	(5)
- Correct as of 28 May 2025
International career
Years	Team	Apps	(Points)
2023–2024	Australia A	2	(0)
2023–24	Australia	3	(0)
- Correct as of 28 May 2025

Issak Fines-Leleiwasa (born 2 October 1995 in Australia) is an Australian rugby union player who plays for the Fijian Drua in Super Rugby. His playing position is scrum-half. He has signed for the Western Force squad in 2022.

In 2023, Fines-Leleiwasa was selected as a member of the Australian squad for the 2023 Rugby World Cup.
