= Brynard Stander =

South African rugby union player

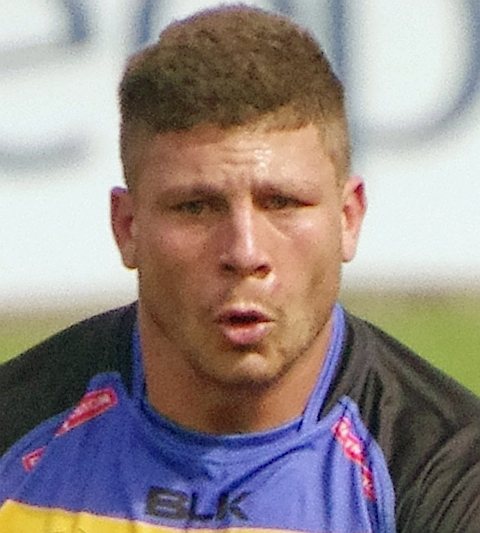
- Stander in 2016
- Full name: Brynard Stander
- Born: 27 April 1990 (age 36) Durban, South Africa
- Height: 1.90 m (6 ft 3 in)
- Weight: 106 kg (16 st 10 lb; 234 lb)
- School: Westville Boys' High School

Rugby union career
- Position: Flanker
- Current team: Force
Youth career
- 2005–2011: Sharks
Senior career
Years	Team	Apps	(Points)
2012–2013	Sharks (CC)	24	(30)
2014–2016	Perth Spirit	14	(22)
2014–present	Force	50	(20)
- Correct as of 3 March 2022

Brynard Stander is a South African rugby union player, currently playing in Australia with the Western Force. His usual position is flanker.

He previously played for the Sharks in the Currie Cup and Vodacom Cup, but signed a two-year contract with the Force prior to the 2014 Super Rugby season.

== Super Rugby statistics ==
As of 7 July 2017

Season	Team	Games	Start	Sub	Mins	T	C	PG	DG	Pts	YC	RC
2014	Force	14	2	12	397	1	0	0	0	5	0	0
2015	Force	6	3	3	274	0	0	0	0	0	0	0
2016	Force	13	9	4	754	1	0	0	0	5	1	0
2017	Force	9	6	3	513	0	0	0	0	0	0	0
Total		42	30	22	1935	2	0	0	0	10	1	0
