= Brad Lacey =

Australian rugby union player (born 1994)

- Born: 11 April 1994 (age 32) Durban, South Africa
- Height: 1.81 m (5 ft 11 1/2 in)
- Weight: 92 kg (14 st 7 lb; 203 lb)
- School: Canning Vale College

Rugby union career
- Position: Wing
- Current team: Western Force
Senior career
Years	Team	Apps	(Points)
2014-2016	Perth Spirit	10	(25)
2019	Force		
2020-2022	Western Force	12	(5)
- Correct as of 16 July 2016
International career
Years	Team	Apps	(Points)
2013–14	Australia U20		
- Correct as of 13 November 2015

Brad Lacey (born 11 April 1994) is a South African-born, Australian rugby union player who currently plays for the Western Force in the international Super Rugby competition. Domestically he is contracted to the Perth Spirit who compete in the National Rugby Championship. His regular playing position is on the wing.

Lacey was a member of the Australia under-20 side which competed in the 2013 and 2014 IRB Junior World Championships in France and New Zealand respectively.
