= Chris Alcock =

South African rugby union player

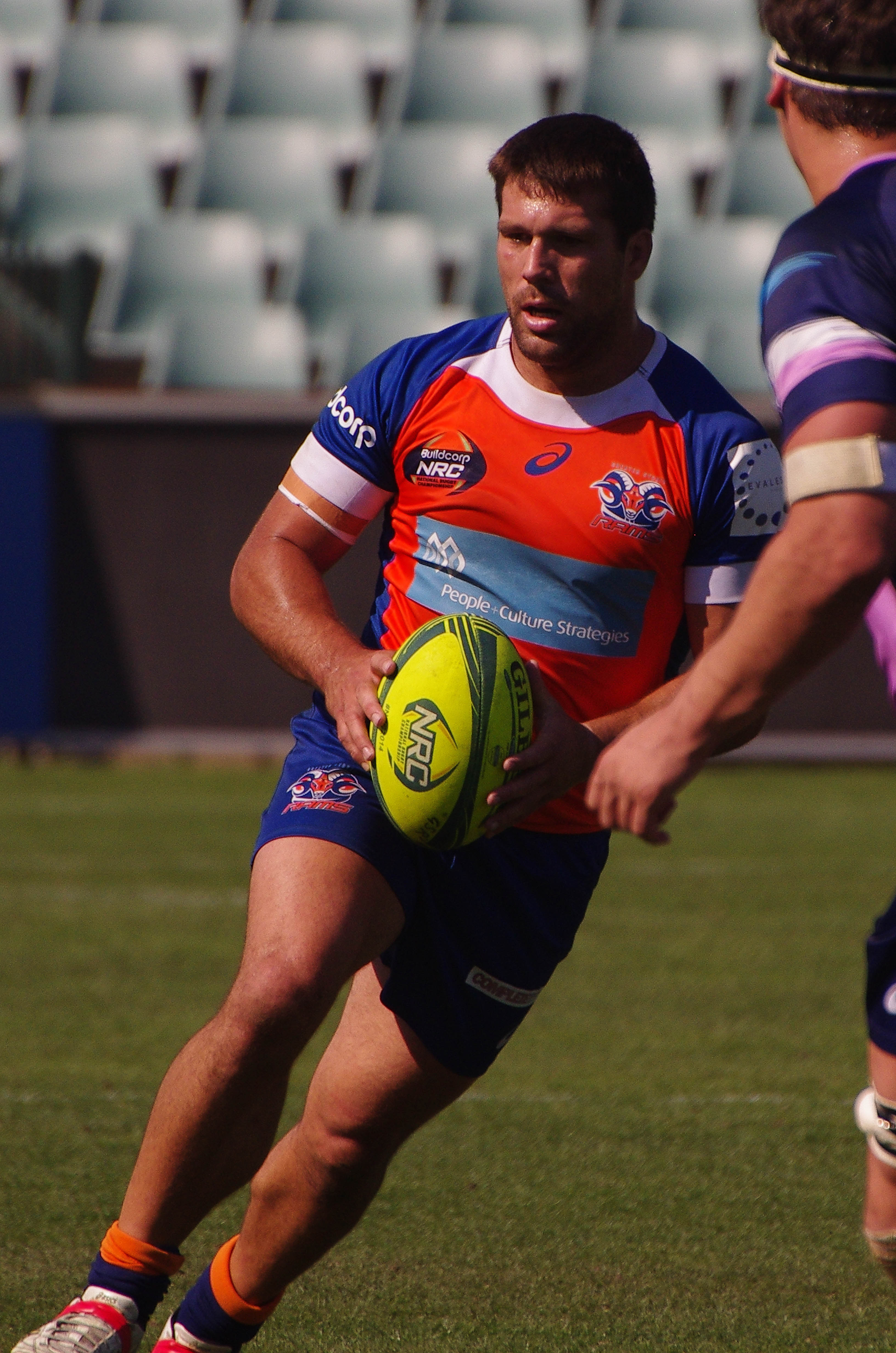
- Born: Chris Alcock; 24 June 1988 (age 38) Durban, KwaZulu-Natal, South Africa
- Height: 1.83 m (6 ft 0 in)
- Weight: 106 kg (16 st 10 lb)
- School: Barker College, Sydney

Rugby union career
- Position: Openside Flanker
Senior career
Years	Team	Apps	(Points)
2014	Greater Sydney Rams	7	(10)
2015	Perth Spirit	2	(0)
2016	Sydney Rays	4	(5)
2017	Kamaishi Seawaves	8	(25)
2018-2019	Western Force	8	(10)
2018	Suntory Sungoliath	3	(0)
- Correct as of 23 April 2021
Super Rugby
Years	Team	Apps	(Points)
2010–12	Waratahs	25	(5)
2013–2016	Western Force	30	(10)
2017	Brumbies	14	(10)
- Correct as of 23 April 2021

Chris Alcock (born 24 June 1988 in Durban, South Africa) is a rugby union footballer. His regular playing position is openside flanker.

Alcock moved to Australia with his family at the age of 10. He attended Barker College in Sydney.

He made his senior debut during the 2010 Super 14 season for the New South Wales Waratahs against the Cheetahs and made a total of 25 appearances for the franchise before moving west to join the Force ahead of the 2013 Super Rugby season.

== Super Rugby statistics ==
As of 20 July 2016

Season	Team	Games	Starts	Sub	Mins	Tries	Cons	Pens	Drops	Points	Yel	Red
2010	Waratahs	1	1	0	80	0	0	0	0	0	0	0
2011	Waratahs	12	3	9	409	1	0	0	0	5	0	0
2012	Waratahs	12	11	1	832	0	0	0	0	0	0	0
2013	Force	16	9	7	844	0	0	0	0	0	1	0
2014	Force	3	1	2	106	0	0	0	0	0	0	0
2015	Force	7	6	1	475	2	0	0	0	10	0	0
2016	Force	4	4	0	320	0	0	0	0	0	0	0
2017	Brumbies	14	14	0	1050	2	0	0	0	0	0	0
Total		69	49	20	4116	5	0	0	0	15	1	0
