= Jack McGregor (rugby union) =

- Born: 10 January 1997 (age 29) Sydney, Australia
- Height: 179 cm (5 ft 10 in)
- Weight: 87 kg (192 lb; 13 st 10 lb)
- School: St. Ignatius' College

Rugby union career
- Position(s): Fullback, First five-eighth
- Current team: Force
Senior career
Years	Team	Apps	(Points)
2017	Melbourne Rising	8	(54)
2018–	Force	16	(20)
- Correct as of 20 July 2020

Jack McGregor is an Australian rugby union player who is signed for the Melbourne Rebels in the Super Rugby competition. His position of choice is fly-half.

McGregor signed with the Melbourne Rebels after captaining NSW Schools 1st XV & Australian Schoolboys in his final year at St. Ignatius College. He would go on to turn out for the Rebels U20 side before being selected for the Australian U20s however, would not make an appearance for the top team in Super Rugby, with Jack Debrezceni & Reece Hodge the preferred No 10s. He would later be released by Melbourne in 2018 & subsequently signed with the Western Force, turning out for their NRC team instead.

== Super Rugby statistics ==
As of 15 July 2018

Season	Team	Games	Starts	Sub	Mins	Tries	Cons	Pens	Drops	Points	Yel	Red
2017	Rebels	0	0	0	0	0	0	0	0	0	0	0
2018	Rebels	0	0	0	0	0	0	0	0	0	0	0
Total		0	0	0	0	0	0	0	0	0	0	0
