= Johan Bardoul =

New Zealand rugby union player

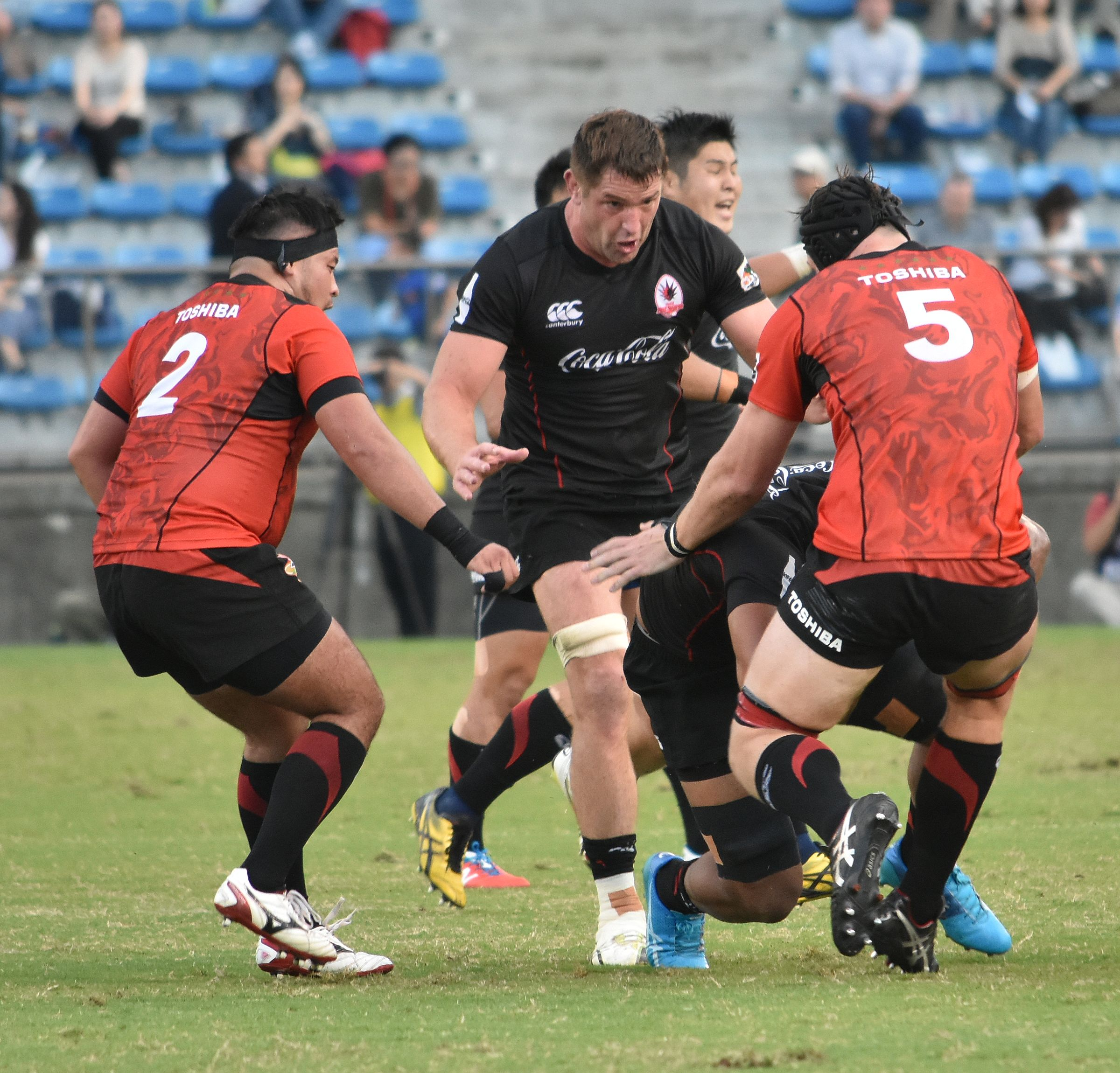
- Johan Bardoul 2018
- Full name: Johan Bardoul
- Born: 16 June 1987 (age 39) Te Awamutu, New Zealand
- Height: 1.92 m (6 ft 4 in)
- Weight: 118 kg (18 st 8 lb; 260 lb)

Rugby union career
- Position: Loose forward
Senior career
Years	Team	Apps	(Points)
2012	Waikato	1	(0)
2013–2015	Bay of Plenty	29	(40)
2015–2016	Chiefs	11	(0)
2016–2018	Yamaha Júbilo	0	(0)
- Correct as of 15 January 2017

Johan Bardoul (born 16 June 1987) is a New Zealand rugby union player who currently plays as a loose forward for the Coca-Cola Red Sparks in the Top Challenge League. Despite a long career Johan still maintains a desire to represent Te Awamutu Sports as the pinnacle of Waikato club rugby

== Career ==
Bardoul started out his senior career with Waikato, however a lack of game time saw him join the Bay of Plenty Steamers in 2013. The Steamers were relegated from the ITM Cup Premier Division in 2013 and then finished bottom of the Championship the following year, however Bardoul's own personal performances were strong. He was called up to the Chiefs wider training group towards the end of the 2013 Super Rugby season to cover for the injured Michael Leitch and won a full-time contract in 2015.
