= Marcel Brache =

American rugby union player

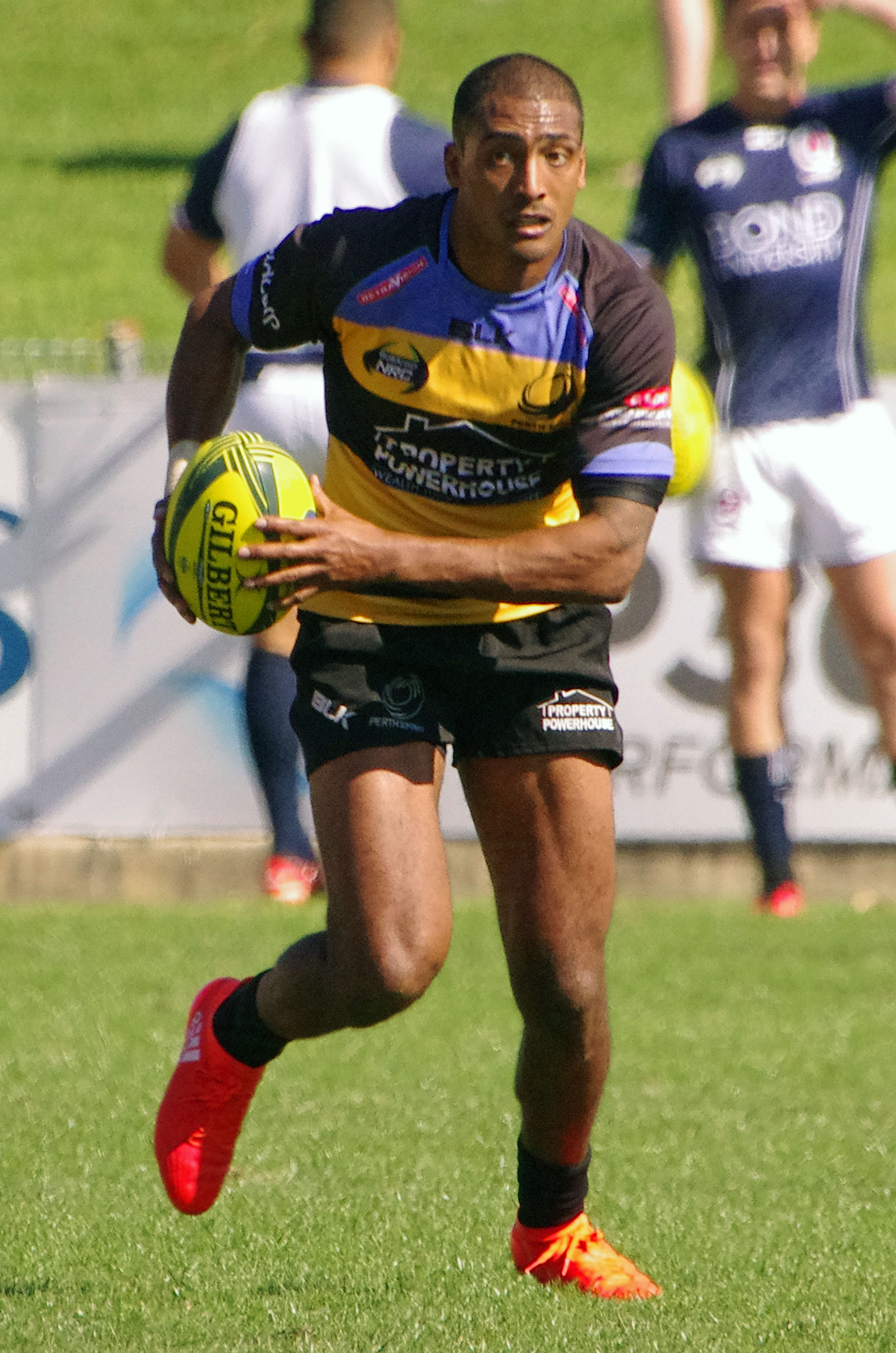
- Brache playing for Perth Spirit in the 2016 National Rugby Championship
- Full name: Marcel Girard Brache
- Born: 15 October 1987 (age 39) Los Angeles, California, United States
- Height: 1.93 m (6 ft 4 in)
- Weight: 94 kg (14 st 11 lb; 207 lb)
- School: Rondebosch Boys' High School
- University: University of Cape Town

Rugby union career
- Position: Centre / Wing
- Current team: Western Force
Amateur team(s)
Years	Team	Apps	(Points)
2010–2011	UCT Ikey Tigers	15	(24)
Senior career
Years	Team	Apps	(Points)
2010–2013	Western Province	42	(30)
2012	Stormers	1	(0)
2014–2017	Perth Spirit	19	(38)
2014–2021	Western Force	58	(50)
2022	Austin Gilgronis	5	(5)
2023	San Diego Legion	36	(27)
- Correct as of 16 June 2025
International career
Years	Team	Apps	(Points)
2016–	United States	28	(10)
- Correct as of 23 October 2021

Marcel Girard Brache (born 15 October 1987) is an American retired rugby union player. Brache was born in Los Angeles, California and was raised primarily in South Africa. He currently plays for the San Diego Legion of Major League Rugby (MLR), generally as a centre but can also play wing.

== Rugby career ==
Brache represented Western Province from 2011 to 2013 in the Currie Cup and Vodacom Cup. Brache represented the Stormers in Super Rugby during the 2012 season where he made 1 substitute appearance, but did not make the Stormers squad for the 2013 season. Brache previously played for the Ikey Tigers in the Varsity Cup.

Brache joined Australian Super Rugby side the Western Force in late 2013 on a two-year deal before the 2014 Super Rugby season. Brache has played over 30 games for Western Force since his debut before scoring a try. Then, on 7 May 2015, he scored a first half hat-trick for the Western Force in their match against the Sunwolves.

He signed for Major League Rugby team Austin Gilgronis ahead of the 2022 season.

== International ==
Brache represents the United States national team at the international level and is eligible by birth. Brache debuted for the United States during the November 2016 tests.

== Super Rugby statistics ==
As of 20 July 2016

Season	Team	Games	Starts	Sub	Minutes	Tries	Cons	Pens	Drops	Points
2012	Stormers	1	0	1	46	0	0	0	0	0
2014	Force	9	7	2	550	0	0	0	0	0
2015	Force	14	12	2	875	0	0	0	0	0
2016	Force	13	11	2	870	3	0	0	0	15
Total		37	30	7	2341	3	0	0	0	15
