= Global Rapid Rugby =

International rugby union competition

- Most recent season 2020 Global Rapid Rugby season
- Sport: Rugby union
- Formerly known as: World Series Rugby (2018)
- Instituted: 2018; 8 years ago
- Inaugural season: 2018
- Ceased: 2020
- Chair: Mark Evans
- Number of teams: 6
- Country: Australia; China; Fiji; Hong Kong; Malaysia; Samoa
- Holders: Western Force (2019)
- Most titles: Western Force (1 title)
- Website: www.rapidrugby.com

Global Rapid Rugby was an international rugby union competition that launched a showcase series for six professional teams in 2019, played in locations across the Asia-Pacific region. Rapid Rugby matches are slightly shorter than the traditional 80 minutes and have other variations from standard rugby laws that are intended to increase the speed of the game.

The 2020 Global Rapid Rugby season was cancelled due to the coronavirus pandemic after only one completed round of competition.

== History ==
The competition was conceived and is supported by the Australian billionaire Andrew Forrest. It was devised after the Western Force rugby team based in Perth, Western Australia was unilaterally dropped from the Australian Super Rugby Conference.

=== Background ===
Following SANZAAR's decision to reduce the number of Super Rugby teams for 2018, the Australian Rugby Union (now Rugby Australia) announced in August 2017 that the Western Force would be one of the teams cut from the 2018 competition. In the following month, Perth-based businessman Andrew Forrest announced that he would create a new tournament called the Indo-Pacific Rugby Championship which would include the Western Force and five other teams from the Indo-Pacific region.

For the 2018 season, the competition was launched as World Series Rugby, played as a series of exhibition matches as the precursor to a wider Asia-Pacific competition planned for 2019. The newly reformed Western Force played international teams from Hong Kong, Samoa, and Tonga along with Super Rugby teams the Crusaders and Melbourne Rebels, Japanese Top League team Panasonic Wild Knights, and the Fiji Warriors, the second-tier national side. The series began on 4 May 2018.

=== Rapid Rugby launched ===
The competition was re-branded in November 2018 as Global Rapid Rugby, and the Hong Kong Rugby Union was appointed the governing body for the competition ahead of the 2019 season. A season of fourteen matches was played in 2019, featuring the Western Force playing a Pacific Showcase Series in a round-robin format with teams from Fiji and Samoa, as well as an Asian Showcase Series in a round-robin format with teams based out of Hong Kong and Singapore. One-off matches were also played against a World XV coached by Robbie Deans, and the Malaysia Valke. The Singapore-based team, the Asia Pacific Dragons, did not continue in Rapid Rugby after the 2019 season and was replaced by the China Lions in 2020.

== Teams ==
Six teams compete in Rapid Rugby:

Team	City	Stadium	Capacity	Head coach
China Lions	~~Shanghai~~, Rotorua	Rotorua International Stadium	34,000	Mike Rogers
(Fiji) Fijian Latui	Suva	ANZ Stadium	15,000	Senirusi Seruvakula
Manuma Samoa	Apia	Apia Park Stadium	12,000	Brian Lima
Malaysia Valke	Kuala Lumpur	Bukit Jalil National Stadium	87,411	Rudy Joubert
(Hong Kong) South China Tigers	Hong Kong	Hong Kong Stadium	40,000	Craig Hammond
(Australia) Western Force	Perth	HBF Park	20,500	Tim Sampson

== Champions ==
No.	Season	Champion
1	2019	(Australia) Western Force
2	2020	Cancelled due to COVID-19 pandemic

=== Conference winners by team ===
In 2019, 5 teams played in 2 conferences. With teams playing each team in their own conference twice (home and away) except Western Force played teams in both conferences. The winner of each conference is awarded a home final.

Year	Asia Showcase Series	Pacific Showcase Series
2019	(Australia) Western Force	(Australia) Western Force

== Law variations ==
Law variations for Rapid Rugby included:

Power try

- A 9-point 'power try' for attacks launched within 22 meters of the scoring team's own try line.

Set piece time limits

- Time limits for scrums (1 minute) and lineouts (45 seconds to set),

Kicking to touch

- Teams cannot gain ground when kicking direct to touch, even from within their 22. Kicking to touch from inside the 22 is the same as the World Rugby law for outside the 22.

Game duration

- Matches last 70 minutes (compared with 80 minutes under the standard rugby union laws),

Super Rugby in Australia averages around 30 minutes of ‘ball-in-play’ per match. However, the matches in 2018 World Series Rugby – the precursor to Rapid Rugby – had a comparable 'ball-in-play' time almost 30% greater.

== Players ==
Global Rapid Rugby had intended to attract about 20 of the world's top 100 rugby players with marquee contracts to be spread across the eight franchises and had no salary cap.

== Media coverage ==
Rapid Rugby currently has live broadcast television coverage in 18 countries across Asia and Oceania. Live streaming and video on demand services reach additional viewers within some Asia-Pacific countries, while Rapid Rugby's own website provides live streams and highlight packages to other regions worldwide.

For the 2019 showcase series, nine of the fourteen matches over the season were televised. Fox Sports in Australia and related companies Star Sports and Fox Sports Asia will provide the live coverage.

National broadcaster SBS showed all nine of these matches live on free-to-air television across Australia via its SBS Viceland channel and also streamed through SBS on Demand. Other Rapid Rugby media partners included Kayo Sports in Australia, Sky Sport in New Zealand and Fiji TV.

== Corporate relations ==
=== Sponsorship ===
The 2019 showcase series did not currently have a principal naming rights partner, but major official partners include IHG Hotels & Resorts, K&L Gates and Harvey Beef.

Their official rugby ball supplier was Rhino Sport.

== See also ==
- Asia Rugby
- Oceania Rugby
- National Rugby Championship
