= List of 2013–14 Super Rugby transfers =

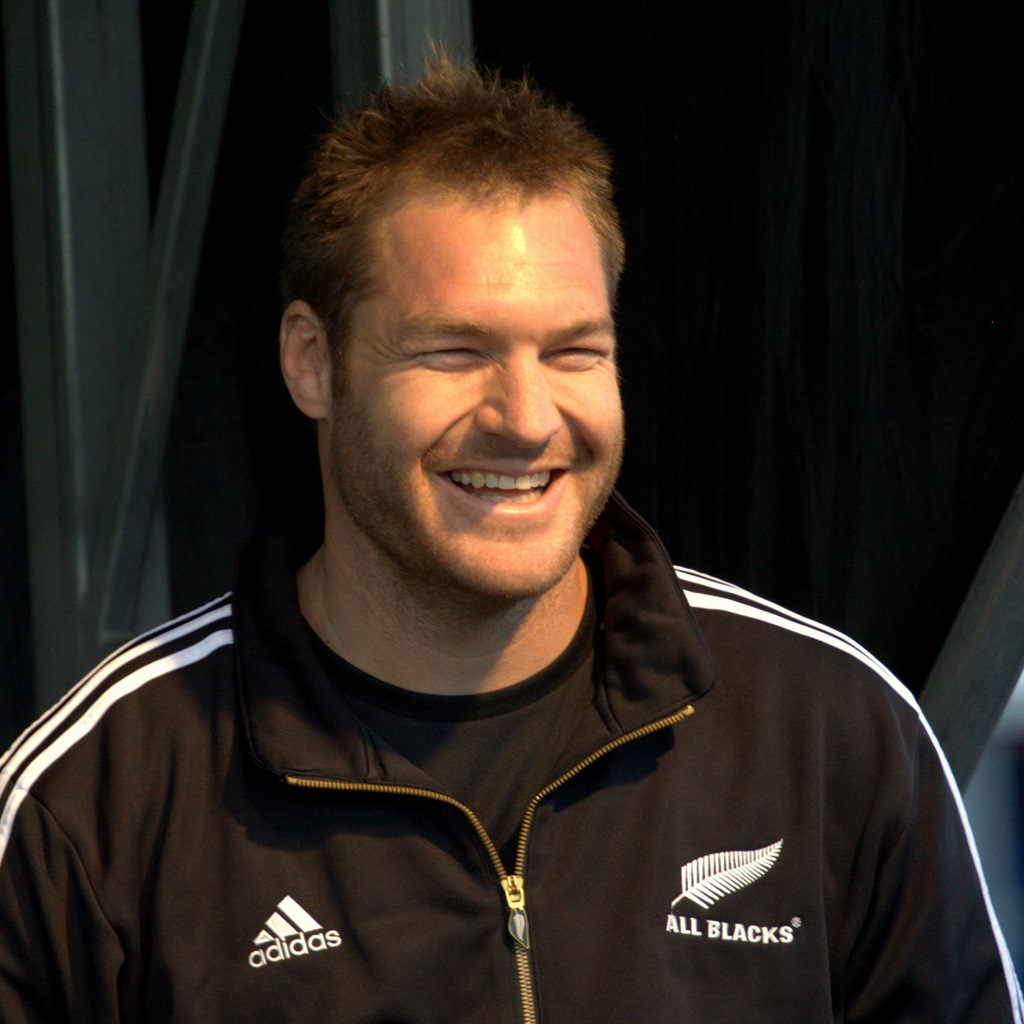
2013 Blues captain Ali Williams retired from international rugby during the 2013 Super Rugby season. He subsequently signed to play for Toulon after playing 117 Super Rugby matches.

This is a list of player signings and releases involving Super Rugby teams prior to the end of the 2014 Super Rugby season. The release of a player that was included in a 2013 Super Rugby season squad, or the signing of a new player for the 2014 season is listed here regardless of when it occurred. Players that have been confirmed for the 2014 season are also listed, regardless of when they signed for the team.

Australian and New Zealand teams name their squads for the 2014 season – typically containing 30 players – in late 2013. Many sides also name additional players that train in backup or development squads for the franchises. These players are denoted by (wider training group) for New Zealand teams, or (extended playing squad) for Australian teams. In South Africa, all teams have affiliated provincial sides playing in their domestic Vodacom Cup competition.

Notes:

- 2013 players listed are all players that were named in the initial senior squad, or subsequently included in a 22-man match day squad at any game during the season.
- (did not play) denotes that a player did not play at all during one of the two seasons due to injury or non-selection. These players are included to indicate they were contracted to the team.
- (short-term) denotes that a player wasn't initially contracted, but came in during the season. This could either be a club rugby player coming in as injury cover, or a player whose contract had expired at another team (typically in the northern hemisphere).
- Flags are only shown for players moving to or from another country.
- Players may play in several positions, but are listed in only one.

== Australia ==
=== Brumbies ===
Brumbies transfers 2013–14
Pos	2013 squad	Out	In	2014 squad
PR	Ben Alexander; Ruaidhri Murphy; Dan Palmer; Scott Sio; Ruan Smith (extended playing squad)	(substituted off) Dan Palmer (to (France) Grenoble)	(substituted on) Allan Alaalatoa (from Southern Districts); (substituted on) JP Smith (from GPS Rugby)	Allan Alaalatoa (extended playing squad); Ben Alexander; Ruaidhri Murphy; Scott Sio; JP Smith (extended playing squad); Ruan Smith
HK	Joshua Mann-Rea (extended playing squad); Stephen Moore; Siliva Siliva		(substituted on) Luke Holmes (from Warringah)	Luke Holmes (short-term); Joshua Mann-Rea; Stephen Moore; Siliva Siliva
LK	Sam Carter; Scott Fardy; Etienne Oosthuizen; Leon Power	(substituted off) Etienne Oosthuizen (to (South Africa) Sharks)	(substituted on) Tom Staniforth (from Canberra Royals); (substituted on) Jack Whetton (from (New Zealand) Auckland)	Sam Carter; Scott Fardy; Leon Power; Tom Staniforth (short-term); Jack Whetton
FL	Fotu Auelua; Colby Fainga'a; Peter Kimlin; David Pocock; Jordan Smiler (extended playing squad); George Smith (short-term); Ita Vaea (did not play)	(substituted off) Colby Fainga'a (to Rebels); (substituted off) Peter Kimlin (to (France) Grenoble); (substituted off) George Smith (returned to (Japan) Suntory Sungoliath); (substituted off) Ita Vaea (to NSW Country Eagles)	(substituted on) Jarrad Butler (from Reds); (substituted on) Tom McVerry (from (Japan) Kyuden Voltex)	Fotu Auelua; Jarrad Butler; Tom McVerry (short-term); David Pocock; Jordan Smiler
N8	Ben Mowen		(substituted on) Lachlan McCaffrey (from Force)	Lachlan McCaffrey (extended playing squad); Ben Mowen
SH	Ian Prior; Mark Swanepoel (extended playing squad); Nic White	(substituted off) Ian Prior (to Force); (substituted off) Mark Swanepoel (to (New Zealand) Tasman)	(substituted on) Michael Dowsett (from Northern Suburbs); (substituted on) Conrad Hoffmann (from (South Africa) Hamiltons)	Michael Dowsett (extended playing squad); Conrad Hoffmann; Nic White
FH	Zack Holmes; Matt To'omua	(substituted off) Zack Holmes (to Force)	(substituted on) Lionel Cronjé (from (South Africa) Golden Lions)	Lionel Cronjé; Matt To'omua
CE	Tevita Kuridrani; Christian Lealiifano; Pat McCabe; Andrew Smith		(substituted on) Rodney Iona (from Tuggeranong Vikings)	Rodney Iona (short-term); Tevita Kuridrani; Christian Lealiifano; Pat McCabe; Andrew Smith
WG	Tom Cox (did not play); Clyde Rathbone; Henry Speight; Joe Tomane	(substituted off) Tom Cox (to Power House)	(substituted on) Stephan van der Walt (from extended playing squad)	Clyde Rathbone; Henry Speight; Joe Tomane; Stephan van der Walt (extended playing squad, did not play)
FB	Robbie Coleman; Jesse Mogg			Robbie Coleman; Jesse Mogg
Coach	Jake White	(substituted off) Jake White (to (South Africa) Sharks)	(substituted on) Stephen Larkham	Stephen Larkham

=== Force ===
Force transfers 2013–14
Pos	2013 squad	Out	In	2014 squad
PR	Pekahou Cowan; Tetera Faulkner; Kieran Longbottom; Salesi Ma'afu; Salesi Manu (extended playing squad)	(substituted off) Salesi Ma'afu (to (England) Northampton Saints)	(substituted on) Chris Heiberg (from (South Africa) Stormers); (substituted on) Ollie Hoskins (from Cottesloe); (substituted on) Francois van Wyk (from (South Africa) Western Province)	Pekahou Cowan; Tetera Faulkner; Chris Heiberg (did not play); Ollie Hoskins (wider training group); Kieran Longbottom; Salesi Manu (did not play); Francois van Wyk (wider training group)
HK	Nathan Charles; James Hilterbrand (extended playing squad); Heath Tessmann (short-term); Ben Whittaker	(substituted off) James Hilterbrand (to (Scotland) Edinburgh); (substituted off) Ben Whittaker (to (France) Biarritz)		Nathan Charles; Heath Tessmann
LK	Phoenix Battye; Toby Lynn; Rory Walton (extended playing squad); Sam Wykes	(substituted off) Toby Lynn (retired); (substituted off) Rory Walton (to extended playing squad)	(substituted on) Adam Coleman (from Waratahs); (substituted on) Wilhelm Steenkamp (from (South Africa) Bulls)	Phoenix Battye; Adam Coleman (extended playing squad); Wilhelm Steenkamp; Sam Wykes
FL	Chris Alcock; Richard Brown; Angus Cottrell; Matt Hodgson; Hugh McMeniman	(substituted off) Richard Brown (to (Japan) Honda Heat)	(substituted on) Ryan Hodson (from Jersey); (substituted on) Brynard Stander (from (South Africa) Sharks (Currie Cup))	Chris Alcock; Angus Cottrell; Matt Hodgson; Ryan Hodson (short-term); Hugh McMeniman; Brynard Stander
N8	Lachlan McCaffrey (did not play); Ben McCalman	(substituted off) Lachlan McCaffrey (to Brumbies extended playing squad)		Ben McCalman
SH	Chris Eaton (short-term, did not play); Alby Mathewson; Brett Sheehan; Michael Snowden (extended playing squad)	(substituted off) Chris Eaton (to (New Zealand) Hawke's Bay); (substituted off) Brett Sheehan (to (England) London Wasps); (substituted off) Michael Snowden (to (New Zealand) Waikato)	(substituted on) Ian Prior (from Brumbies); (substituted on) Justin Turner (from Associates)	Alby Mathewson; Ian Prior; Justin Turner (short-term)
FH	Sam Christie; Sias Ebersohn; Kyle Godwin	(substituted off) Sam Christie (to (New Zealand) Waikato)	(substituted on) Zack Holmes (from Brumbies)	Sias Ebersohn; Kyle Godwin; Zack Holmes
CE	Patrick Dellit; Jayden Hayward; Ben Jacobs (short-term); Junior Rasolea; Winston Stanley; Chris Tuatara-Morrison (did not play); Will Tupou	(substituted off) Ben Jacobs (to (England) London Wasps); (substituted off) Winston Stanley (to (New Zealand) Highlanders); (substituted off) Will Tupou (to (Japan) Hino Red Dolphins)	(substituted on) Marcel Brache (from (South Africa) Western Province); (substituted on) Luke Burton (from UWA Rugby Club)	Marcel Brache; Luke Burton (extended playing squad); Patrick Dellit; Jayden Hayward; Junior Rasolea; Chris Tuatara-Morrison
WG	Nick Cummins; Alfie Mafi; Ed Stubbs	(substituted off) Alfie Mafi (to (France) Brive)	(substituted on) Dane Haylett-Petty (from (France) Biarritz)	Nick Cummins; Ed Stubbs (did not play); Dane Haylett-Petty
FB	Sam Norton-Knight	(substituted off) Sam Norton-Knight (to (Japan) Kubota Spears)	(substituted on) Dillyn Leyds (from (South Africa) Western Province); (substituted on) Luke Morahan (from Reds)	Dillyn Leyds (wider training group); Luke Morahan
Coach	Michael Foley			Michael Foley

=== Rebels ===
Rebels transfers 2013–14
Pos	2013 squad	Out	In	2014 squad
PR	Eddie Aholelei (did not play); Paul Alo-Emile; Nic Henderson; Laurie Weeks	(substituted off) Nic Henderson (retired)	(substituted on) Cruze Ah-Nau (from extended playing squad); (substituted on) Max Lahiff (from (England) London Irish); (substituted on) Toby Smith (from (New Zealand) Chiefs)	Cruze Ah-Nau (extended playing squad); Eddie Aholelei (did not play); Paul Alo-Emile; Max Lahiff; Toby Smith; Laurie Weeks
HK	Shota Horie; Patrick Leafa (extended playing squad); Ged Robinson	(substituted off) Ged Robinson (to (New Zealand) Hawke's Bay)	(substituted on) Steve Fualau (from Southern Districts); (substituted on) Tom Sexton (from (Ireland) Leinster)	Steve Fualau (short-term); Shota Horie; Patrick Leafa (extended playing squad); Tom Sexton (did not play)
LK	Luke Jones; James King; Cadeyrn Neville; Hugh Pyle; Chris Thomson (did not play)	(substituted off) James King (to (Japan) Yakult Levins)	(substituted on) Sam Jeffries (from Melbourne University)	Sam Jeffries (extended playing squad); Luke Jones; Cadeyrn Neville; Hugh Pyle; Chris Thomson (did not play)
FL	Tim Davidson; Scott Fuglistaller; Scott Higginbotham; Jordy Reid (extended playing squad); Jarrod Saffy	(substituted off) Tim Davidson (retired); (substituted off) Jarrod Saffy (to (France) Bourg-en-Bresse)	(substituted on) Colby Fainga'a (from Brumbies); (substituted on) Sean McMahon (from GPS)	Colby Fainga'a; Scott Fuglistaller; Scott Higginbotham; Sean McMahon (extended playing squad); Jordy Reid
N8	Gareth Delve	(substituted off) Gareth Delve (to (Japan) NEC Green Rockets)	(substituted on) Lopeti Timani (from Waratahs)	Lopeti Timani
SH	Luke Burgess (short-term); Nick Phipps; Nic Stirzaker	(substituted off) Nick Phipps (to Waratahs)	(substituted on) Josh Holmes (from Warringah); (substituted on) Ben Meehan (from Sunnybank)	Luke Burgess; Josh Holmes (short-term); Ben Meehan (extended playing squad); Nic Stirzaker
FH	Angus Roberts; James Hilgendorf (short-term)	(substituted off) James Hilgendorf (retired)	(substituted on) Jack Debreczeni (from West Harbour)	Jack Debreczeni (extended playing squad); Angus Roberts
CE	Tom English (extended playing squad); Mitch Inman; Lachlan Mitchell; James O'Connor; Rory Sidey	(substituted off) James O'Connor (to (England) London Irish); (substituted off) Rory Sidey (to West Harbour)	(substituted on) Tamati Ellison (from (New Zealand) Highlanders); (substituted on) Lalakai Foketi (from Manly); (substituted on) Male Sa'u (from (Japan) Yamaha Júbilo)	Tamati Ellison; Tom English; Lalakai Foketi (extended playing squad); Mitch Inman; Lachlan Mitchell; Male Sa'u (short-term)
WG	Richard Kingi; Kimami Sitauti; Cooper Vuna	(substituted off) Richard Kingi (to (France) Stade Français); (substituted off) Kimami Sitauti (to Reds 'A'); (substituted off) Cooper Vuna (to (Japan) Toshiba Brave Lupus)	(substituted on) Tom Kingston (from Waratahs); (substituted on) Telusa Veainu (from (New Zealand) Crusaders)	Tom Kingston; Telusa Veainu
FB	Kurtley Beale; Bryce Hegarty (extended playing squad); Alex Rokobaro; Jason Woodward	(substituted off) Kurtley Beale (to Waratahs)		Bryce Hegarty; Alex Rokobaro; Jason Woodward
Coach	Damien Hill	(substituted off) Damien Hill (to (Japan) Ricoh Black Rams)	(substituted on) Tony McGahan (from Australia national team) (Coaching co-ordinator)	Tony McGahan

=== Reds ===
Reds transfers 2013–14
Pos	2013 squad	Out	In	2014 squad
PR	Ben Daley; Greg Holmes; Jono Owen; James Slipper		(substituted on) Sef Fa'agase (from University of Queensland); (substituted on) Pettowa Paraka (from Easts Tigers)	Ben Daley; Sef Fa'agase (wider training squad, did not play); Greg Holmes; Jono Owen; Pettowa Paraka (wider training squad, did not play); James Slipper
HK	Albert Anae; Saia Fainga'a; James Hanson		(substituted on) Andrew Ready (from Easts Tigers)	Albert Anae; Saia Fainga'a; James Hanson; Andrew Ready (wider training squad, did not play)
LK	James Horwill; David McDuling (did not play); Ed O'Donoghue (academy); Rob Simmons; Adam Wallace-Harrison	(substituted off) Adam Wallace-Harrison (retired)		James Horwill; David McDuling; Ed O'Donoghue; Rob Simmons
FL	Nigel Ah Wong (extended playing squad, did not play); Curtis Browning (academy); Liam Gill; Eddie Quirk; Beau Robinson	(substituted off) Nigel Ah Wong (to (Japan) Coca-Cola Red Sparks)	(substituted on) Tim Buchanan (from University of Queensland)	Curtis Browning; Tim Buchanan (short-term); Liam Gill; Eddie Quirk; Beau Robinson
N8	Jarrad Butler (extended playing squad); Radike Samo; Jake Schatz	(substituted off) Jarrad Butler (to Brumbies); (substituted off) Radike Samo (to (Japan) Kintetsu Liners)		Jake Schatz
SH	Nick Frisby; Will Genia		(substituted on) Scott Gale (from University of Queensland)	Nick Frisby; Scott Gale (wider training group); Will Genia
FH	Quade Cooper; Ben Lucas			Quade Cooper; Ben Lucas
CE	Anthony Fainga'a; Mike Harris; Jono Lance; Ben Tapuai; Aidan Toua	(substituted off) Jono Lance (to Waratahs)	(substituted on) Sam Johnson (from GPS Rugby); (substituted on) Samu Kerevi (from GPS Rugby)	Anthony Fainga'a; Mike Harris; Sam Johnson (wider training group); Samu Kerevi (extended playing squad); Ben Tapuai; Aidan Toua
WG	Chris Feauai-Sautia; Digby Ioane; Dom Shipperley	(substituted off) Digby Ioane (to (France) Stade Français)	(substituted on) Chris Kuridrani (from GPS Old Boys); (substituted on) Lachlan Turner (from Waratahs)	Chris Feauai-Sautia; Chris Kuridrani (extended playing squad); Dom Shipperley; Lachlan Turner
FB	Rod Davies; Luke Morahan	(substituted off) Luke Morahan (to Force)	(substituted on) Jonah Placid (from Easts Tigers); (substituted on) JJ Taulagi (from University of Queensland)	Rod Davies; Jonah Placid (wider training squad); JJ Taulagi
Coach	Ewen McKenzie	(substituted off) Ewen McKenzie (to Australia national team)	(substituted on) Richard Graham (from Force)	Richard Graham

=== Waratahs ===
Waratahs transfers 2013–14
Pos	2013 squad	Out	In	2014 squad
PR	Richard Aho (short-term); Sekope Kepu; Benn Robinson; Paddy Ryan; Jeremy Tilse	(substituted off) Richard Aho (to (France) Béziers)	(substituted on) Michael Alaalatoa (from West Harbour)	Michael Alaalatoa (short-term); Sekope Kepu; Benn Robinson; Paddy Ryan; Jeremy Tilse
HK	Damien Fitzpatrick (did not play); Luke Holmes (extended playing squad); Tatafu Polota-Nau; John Ulugia	(substituted off) Damien Fitzpatrick (to (France) Lyon); (substituted off) Luke Holmes (to Warringah); (substituted off) John Ulugia (to (France) Bourg-en-Bresse)	(substituted on) Tolu Latu (from Sydney University); (substituted on) Hugo Roach (from Eastwood)	Tolu Latu; Tatafu Polota-Nau; Hugh Roach (short-term)
LK	Ollie Atkins; Adam Coleman (short-term); Kane Douglas; Jed Holloway (extended playing squad); Greg Peterson; Will Skelton (extended playing squad); Sitaleki Timani	(substituted off) Ollie Atkins (to (Scotland) Edinburgh); (substituted off) Adam Coleman (to Force extended playing squad); (substituted off) Greg Peterson (to extended playing squad); (substituted off) Sitaleki Timani (to (France) Montpellier)		Kane Douglas; Jed Holloway (did not play); Will Skelton
FL	Mitchell Chapman; Dave Dennis; AJ Gilbert (short-term); Michael Hooper; Pat McCutcheon; Lopeti Timani; Liam Winton (short-term)	(substituted off) AJ Gilbert (to Northern Suburbs); (substituted off) Lopeti Timani (to Rebels); (substituted off) Liam Winton (to Sydney University)	(substituted on) Tala Gray (from (France) Biarritz); (substituted on) Jacques Potgieter (from (South Africa) Bulls)	Mitchell Chapman; Dave Dennis; Tala Gray; Michael Hooper; Pat McCutcheon; Jacques Potgieter
N8	Wycliff Palu		(substituted on) Stephen Hoiles (from Randwick)	Stephen Hoiles (short-term); Wycliff Palu
SH	Grayson Hart (did not play); Matt Lucas (extended playing squad); Brendan McKibbin	(substituted off) Grayson Hart (to (Scotland) Edinburgh); (substituted off) Matt Lucas (to extended playing squad)	(substituted on) Nick Phipps (from Rebels)	Brendan McKibbin; Nick Phipps
FH	Berrick Barnes; Bernard Foley	(substituted off) Berrick Barnes (to (Japan) Panasonic Wild Knights)		Bernard Foley
CE	Tom Carter; Israel Folau; Michael Hodge (did not play); Rob Horne	(substituted off) Tom Carter (retired)	(substituted on) Matthew Carraro (from (France) Montpellier); (substituted on) Jono Lance (from Reds)	Matthew Carraro; Israel Folau; Michael Hodge (did not play); Rob Horne; Jono Lance
WG	Adam Ashley-Cooper; Peter Betham; Terrence Hepetema (short-term); Tom Kingston; Drew Mitchell; Lachlan Turner	(substituted off) Terrence Hepetema (to Randwick); (substituted off) Tom Kingston (to Rebels); (substituted off) Drew Mitchell (to (France) Toulon); (substituted off) Lachlan Turner (to Reds)	(substituted on) Alofa Alofa (from West Harbour); (substituted on) Taqele Naiyaravoro (from (Australia) Wests Tigers)	Alofa Alofa (extended playing squad); Adam Ashley-Cooper; Peter Betham; Taqele Naiyaravoro (short-term)
FB	Cam Crawford; Ben Volavola (extended playing squad)		(substituted on) Kurtley Beale (from Rebels)	Kurtley Beale; Cam Crawford; Ben Volavola (did not play)
Coach	Michael Cheika			Michael Cheika

== New Zealand ==
=== Blues ===
Blues transfers 2013–14
Pos	2013 squad	Out	In	2014 squad
PR	Charlie Faumuina; Tom McCartney; Tim Perry; Sam Prattley (short-term); Angus Ta'avao; Ofa Tu'ungafasi	(substituted off) Tim Perry (to Crusaders)	(substituted on) Tony Woodcock (from Highlanders)	Charlie Faumuina; Tom McCartney; Sam Prattley; Angus Ta'avao; Ofa Tu'ungafasi; Tony Woodcock
HK	Quentin MacDonald; Keven Mealamu; James Parsons; Gafatasi Su'a (short-term, did not play)	(substituted off) Quentin MacDonald (to (Ireland) Munster); (substituted off) Gafatasi Su'a (to Auckland)		Keven Mealamu; James Parsons
LK	Anthony Boric; Liaki Moli; Ronald Raaymakers; Culum Retallick; Ali Williams	(substituted off) Anthony Boric (to (Japan) Mitsubishi Sagamihara DynaBoars); (substituted off) Ronald Raaymakers (to Counties Manukau); (substituted off) Culum Retallick (withdrawn from squad); (substituted off) Ali Williams (to (France) Toulon)	(substituted on) Tom Donnelly (from Crusaders); (substituted on) Hayden Triggs (from (Japan) Honda Heat); (substituted on) Patrick Tuipulotu (from Auckland)	Tom Donnelly; Liaki Moli; Hayden Triggs; Patrick Tuipulotu
FL	Kane Barrett; Luke Braid; Steve Luatua; Brendon O'Connor		(substituted on) Jerome Kaino (returned from (Japan) Toyota Verblitz); (substituted on) Jordan Manihera (from North Harbour)	Kane Barrett (did not play); Luke Braid; Jerome Kaino; Steve Luatua; Jordan Manihera (short-term); Brendon O'Connor
N8	Peter Saili			Peter Saili
SH	Jamison Gibson-Park; Bryn Hall; Wayne Ngaluafe (short-term); Piri Weepu	(substituted off) Wayne Ngaluafe (to Auckland)	(substituted on) Sonatane Takulua (from Northland)	Jamison Gibson-Park; Bryn Hall; Sonatane Takulua (short-term, did not play); Piri Weepu
FH	Baden Kerr; Chris Noakes		(substituted on) Simon Hickey (from Auckland); (substituted on) Ihaia West (from Hawke's Bay)	Simon Hickey (wider training group); Baden Kerr (did not play); Chris Noakes; Ihaia West (short-term)
CE	Malakai Fekitoa (did not play); Rene Ranger; Francis Saili; Jackson Willison	(substituted off) Malakai Fekitoa (to Highlanders); (substituted off) Rene Ranger (to (France) Montpellier)	(substituted on) Pita Ahki (from North Harbour); (substituted on) Ma'a Nonu (from Highlanders)	Pita Ahki; Ma'a Nonu; Francis Saili; Jackson Willison
WG	Frank Halai; George Moala; Waisake Naholo; Albert Nikoro (wider training group); Lolagi Visinia (wider training group)	(substituted off) Waisake Naholo (to New Zealand Sevens)	(substituted on) Tevita Li (from North Harbour)	Frank Halai; Tevita Li (wider training group); George Moala; Albert Nikoro (wider training group); Lolagi Visinia
FB	Marty McKenzie; Charles Piutau	(substituted off) Marty McKenzie (to New Zealand Sevens)	(substituted on) Benji Marshall (from (Australia) Wests Tigers)	Benji Marshall; Charles Piutau
Coach	John Kirwan			John Kirwan

=== Chiefs ===
Chiefs transfers 2013–14
Pos	2013 squad	Out	In	2014 squad
PR	Ben Afeaki; Josh Hohneck (did not play); Pauliasi Manu (wider training group); Solomona Sakalia (did not play); Toby Smith; Ben Tameifuna	(substituted off) Solomona Sakalia (to Bay of Plenty); (substituted off) Toby Smith (to (Australia) Rebels)	(substituted on) Nick Barrett (from Southland); (substituted on) Jamie Mackintosh (from Highlanders)	Ben Afeaki; Nick Barrett (wider training group); Josh Hohneck; Jamie Mackintosh; Pauliasi Manu; Ben Tameifuna
HK	Hika Elliot; Mike Kainga (wider training group); Rhys Marshall; Mahonri Schwalger	(substituted off) Mike Kainga (to Crusaders wider training group)	(substituted on) Nathan Harris (from Bay of Plenty)	Hika Elliot (did not play); Nathan Harris (short-term); Rhys Marshall; Mahonri Schwalger
LK	Craig Clarke; Michael Fitzgerald; Romana Graham; Brodie Retallick	(substituted off) Craig Clarke (to (Ireland) Connacht); (substituted off) Romana Graham (to (England) Exeter)	(substituted on) Matt Symons (from Canterbury)	Michael Fitzgerald; Brodie Retallick; Matt Symons
FL	Sam Cane; Nick Crosswell; Ross Filipo; Tanerau Latimer; Liam Messam		(substituted on) Tevita Koloamatangi (from Tasman)	Sam Cane; Nick Crosswell; Ross Filipo; Tevita Koloamatangi (wider training group); Tanerau Latimer; Liam Messam
N8	Fritz Lee; Matt Vant Leven (wider training group)	(substituted off) Fritz Lee (to (France) Clermont); (substituted off) Matt Vant Leven (to Waikato)	(substituted on) Liam Squire (from Tasman); (substituted on) Kane Thompson (from (Japan) Canon Eagles)	Liam Squire; Kane Thompson
SH	Tawera Kerr-Barlow; Brendon Leonard (short-term); Augustine Pulu	(substituted off) Brendon Leonard (to (Italy) Zebre)	(substituted on) Brad Weber (from Waikato)	Tawera Kerr-Barlow; Augustine Pulu; Brad Weber (wider training group)
FH	Aaron Cruden; Daniel Waenga (short-term)	(substituted off) Daniel Waenga (to (France) Biarritz)		Aaron Cruden
CE	Bundee Aki; Richard Kahui; Charlie Ngatai; Savenaca Tokula (short-term)	(substituted off) Richard Kahui (to (Japan) Toshiba Brave Lupus); (substituted off) Savenaca Tokula (to (France) Aurillac)	(substituted on) Robbie Fruean (from Crusaders); (substituted on) Anton Lienert-Brown (from Waikato); (substituted on) Jordan Payne (from Auckland); (substituted on) Dwayne Sweeney (from (Japan) Kyuden Voltex)	Bundee Aki; Robbie Fruean; Anton Lienert-Brown (wider training group); Charlie Ngatai; Jordan Payne (short-term); Dwayne Sweeney (short-term)
WG	Lelia Masaga; Tim Nanai-Williams; Patrick Osborne; Asaeli Tikoirotuma	(substituted off) Lelia Masaga (to (Japan) Honda Heat); (substituted off) Patrick Osborne (to Highlanders)	(substituted on) James Lowe (from Tasman); (substituted on) Tom Marshall (from Crusaders)	James Lowe; Tom Marshall; Tim Nanai-Williams; Asaeli Tikoirotuma
FB	Gareth Anscombe; Andrew Horrell; Robbie Robinson		(substituted on) Mils Muliaina (from (Japan) NTT DoCoMo Red Hurricanes)	Gareth Anscombe; Andrew Horrell; Mils Muliaina; Robbie Robinson (did not play)
Coach	Dave Rennie			Dave Rennie

=== Crusaders ===
Crusaders transfers 2013–14
Pos	2013 squad	Out	In	2014 squad
PR	Wyatt Crockett; Owen Franks; Nepo Laulala; Joe Moody		(substituted on) Daniel Lienert-Brown (from Crusaders Academy); (substituted on) Tim Perry (from Blues)	Wyatt Crockett; Owen Franks; Nepo Laulala; Daniel Lienert-Brown (short-term); Joe Moody; Tim Perry
HK	Corey Flynn; Ben Funnell; Codie Taylor			Corey Flynn; Ben Funnell; Codie Taylor
LK	Dominic Bird; Tom Donnelly; Luke Romano; Sam Whitelock	(substituted off) Tom Donnelly (to Blues)	(substituted on) Scott Barrett (from Canterbury Colts)	Scott Barrett (short-term); Dominic Bird; Luke Romano; Sam Whitelock
FL	Shane Christie; Richie McCaw (did not play); Jordan Taufua; Matt Todd; Jimmy Tupou; George Whitelock; Luke Whitelock	(substituted off) Shane Christie (to Highlanders)		Richie McCaw; Jordan Taufua; Matt Todd; Jimmy Tupou; George Whitelock; Luke Whitelock
N8	Kieran Read			Kieran Read
SH	Andy Ellis; Willi Heinz; Jeremy Su'a (did not play)	(substituted off) Jeremy Su'a (to (England) Worcester Warriors)	(substituted on) Mitchell Drummond (from Canterbury)	Mitchell Drummond; Andy Ellis; Willi Heinz
FH	Tyler Bleyendaal; Dan Carter; Tom Taylor		(substituted on) Colin Slade (from Highlanders)	Tyler Bleyendaal; Dan Carter; Colin Slade; Tom Taylor
CE	Ryan Crotty; Robbie Fruean; Adam Whitelock	(substituted off) Robbie Fruean (to Chiefs)	(substituted on) Kieron Fonotia (from Tasman); (substituted on) Rey Lee-Lo (from Hurricanes); (substituted on) Rob Thompson (from Canterbury)	Ryan Crotty; Kieron Fonotia (wider training group); Rey Lee-Lo; Rob Thompson (wider training group); Adam Whitelock
WG	Zac Guildford; Johnny McNicholl; Telusa Veainu (short-term)	(substituted off) Telusa Veainu (to (Australia) Rebels)	(substituted on) Nemani Nadolo (from (Japan) NEC Green Rockets); (substituted on) Nafi Tuitavake (from North Harbour)	Zac Guildford (did not play); Johnny McNicholl; Nemani Nadolo; Nafi Tuitavake (wider training group)
FB	Israel Dagg; Tom Marshall	(substituted off) Tom Marshall (to Chiefs)		Israel Dagg
Coach	Todd Blackadder			Todd Blackadder

=== Highlanders ===
Highlanders transfers 2013–14
Pos	2013 squad	Out	In	2014 squad
PR	Ma'afu Fia; Chris King; Jamie Mackintosh; Bronson Murray (wider training group); Tony Woodcock	(substituted off) Jamie Mackintosh (to Chiefs); (substituted off) Bronson Murray (to Northland); (substituted off) Tony Woodcock (to Blues)	(substituted on) Matías Díaz (from (Argentina) Teqüe); (substituted on) Kane Hames (from Bay of Plenty); (substituted on) JP Koen (from Southland); (substituted on) Craig Millar (from Otago); (substituted on) Aki Seiuli (from Otago)	Matías Díaz; Ma'afu Fia; Kane Hames; Chris King; JP Koen (short-term); Craig Millar (wider training group); Aki Seiuli (short-term, did not play)
HK	Liam Coltman; Andrew Hore; Brayden Mitchell; Jason Rutledge (short-term)	(substituted off) Andrew Hore (to Southland); (substituted off) Jason Rutledge (to Southland)	(substituted on) Sam Anderson-Heather (from Otago); (substituted on) Ged Robinson (from Hawke's Bay)	Sam Anderson-Heather (short-term); Liam Coltman; Brayden Mitchell; Ged Robinson (wider training group)
LK	Josh Bekhuis; Jarrad Hoeata; Brad Thorn; Joe Wheeler		(substituted on) Tom Franklin (from Otago)	Josh Bekhuis; Tom Franklin; Jarrad Hoeata; Brad Thorn; Joe Wheeler
FL	Tim Boys; John Hardie; TJ Ioane (short-term); Jake Paringatai; Mose Tuiali'i (short-term)	(substituted off) Tim Boys (to Southland); (substituted off) Jake Paringatai (to Northland); (substituted off) Mose Tuiali'i (returned to (Japan) Yamaha Júbilo)	(substituted on) Lee Allan (from Otago); (substituted on) Shane Christie (from Crusaders); (substituted on) Gareth Evans (from Otago)	Lee Allan (wider training group); Shane Christie; Gareth Evans; John Hardie; TJ Ioane
N8	Elliot Dixon; Nasi Manu			Elliot Dixon; Nasi Manu
SH	Aaron Smith; Fumiaki Tanaka; Frae Wilson (wider training group)			Aaron Smith; Fumiaki Tanaka; Frae Wilson (did not play)
FH	Hayden Parker; Colin Slade; Lima Sopoaga	(substituted off) Colin Slade (to Crusaders)	(substituted on) Willie Ripia (from Bay of Plenty)	Hayden Parker; Willie Ripia (did not play); Lima Sopoaga
CE	Phil Burleigh; Tamati Ellison; Jason Emery; Ma'a Nonu; Shaun Treeby	(substituted off) Tamati Ellison (to (Australia) Rebels); (substituted off) Ma'a Nonu (to Blues)	(substituted on) Malakai Fekitoa (from Blues); (substituted on) Winston Stanley (from (Australia) Force)	Phil Burleigh; Jason Emery; Malakai Fekitoa; Winston Stanley; Shaun Treeby
WG	Tony Ensor (wider training group); Hosea Gear; Maritino Nemani (short-term); Declan O'Donnell (did not play); Kade Poki; Buxton Popoali'i; Trent Renata (short-term)	(substituted off) Tony Ensor (to Otago); (substituted off) Hosea Gear (to (France) Toulouse); (substituted off) Maritino Nemani (to Bay of Plenty); (substituted off) Declan O'Donnell (to New Zealand Sevens); (substituted off) Kade Poki (to (Japan) Kubota Spears); (substituted off) Buxton Popoali'i (retired)	(substituted on) Richard Buckman (from Hawke's Bay); (substituted on) Patrick Osborne (from Chiefs)	Richard Buckman (wider training group); Patrick Osborne; Trent Renata (wider training group)
FB	Ben Smith		(substituted on) Kurt Baker (from Taranaki)	Kurt Baker; Ben Smith
Coach	Jamie Joseph			Jamie Joseph

=== Hurricanes ===
Hurricanes transfers 2013–14
Pos	2013 squad	Out	In	2014 squad
PR	Ben Franks; Reggie Goodes; Ben May; John Schwalger (short-term); Eric Sione (did not play); Jeffery Toomaga-Allen	(substituted off) Ben May (to (Japan) Fukuoka Sanix Blues)	(substituted on) Brendon Edmonds (from Hawke's Bay); (substituted on) Chris Eves (from Manawatu)	Brendon Edmonds (wider training group); Chris Eves (wider training group); Ben Franks; Reggie Goodes; John Schwalger; Eric Sione (did not play); Jeffery Toomaga-Allen
HK	Dane Coles; Ash Dixon (wider training squad); Motu Matu'u			Dane Coles; Ash Dixon; Motu Matu'u
LK	James Broadhurst; Jason Eaton; Mark Reddish; Jeremy Thrush	(substituted off) Jason Eaton (to (Japan) NTT Communications Shining Arcs)	(substituted on) Mark Abbott (from Hawke's Bay)	Mark Abbott; James Broadhurst; Mark Reddish; Jeremy Thrush
FL	Jack Lam; Faifili Levave; Karl Lowe; Ardie Savea; Brad Shields	(substituted off) Karl Lowe (to (Japan) Canon Eagles)	(substituted on) Adam Hill (from Wellington)	Adam Hill (wider training group); Jack Lam; Faifili Levave; Ardie Savea; Brad Shields
N8	Blade Thomson; Victor Vito			Blade Thomson; Victor Vito
SH	Samisoni Fisilau (did not play); TJ Perenara; Chris Smylie	(substituted off) Samisoni Fisilau (to Bay of Plenty)	(substituted on) Billy Guyton (from Tasman)	Billy Guyton (wider training group); TJ Perenara; Chris Smylie
FH	Beauden Barrett; James Marshall; Tusi Pisi	(substituted off) Tusi Pisi (to (Japan) Suntory Sungoliath)	(substituted on) Marty Banks (from Tasman)	Marty Banks; Beauden Barrett; James Marshall
CE	Tim Bateman; Rey Lee-Lo; Ope Peleseuma (wider training group); Conrad Smith	(substituted off) Rey Lee-Lo (to Crusaders); (substituted off) Ope Peleseuma (to Taranaki)	(substituted on) Hadleigh Parkes (from (South Africa) Southern Kings); (substituted on) Cardiff Vaega (from Southland)	Tim Bateman; Hadleigh Parkes; Conrad Smith; Cardiff Vaega
WG	Cory Jane (did not play); Alapati Leiua; Matt Proctor; Julian Savea			Cory Jane; Alapati Leiua; Matt Proctor; Julian Savea
FB	Andre Taylor			Andre Taylor
Coach	Mark Hammett			Mark Hammett

== South Africa ==
=== Bulls ===
Bulls transfers 2013–14
Pos	2013 squad	Out	In	2014 squad
PR	Dean Greyling; Frik Kirsten; Werner Kruger; Morné Mellett; Hencus van Wyk	(substituted off) Hencus van Wyk (to Blue Bulls)	(substituted on) Marcel van der Merwe (from Blue Bulls)	Dean Greyling; Frik Kirsten; Werner Kruger; Morné Mellett; Marcel van der Merwe
HK	Chiliboy Ralepelle; Callie Visagie (short-term); Willie Wepener	(substituted off) Chiliboy Ralepelle (to (France) Toulouse); (substituted off) Willie Wepener (to Lions)	(substituted on) Bandise Maku (from Southern Kings); (substituted on) Bongi Mbonambi (from Blue Bulls)	Bandise Maku; Bongi Mbonambi; Callie Visagie
LK	Grant Hattingh; Cornell Hess (did not play); Juandré Kruger; Wilhelm Steenkamp; Flip van der Merwe; Paul Willemse	(substituted off) Cornell Hess (to Griquas); (substituted off) Juandré Kruger (to (France) Racing Métro); (substituted off) Wilhelm Steenkamp (to (Australia) Force)	(substituted on) David Bulbring (from Southern Kings); (substituted on) Nico Janse van Rensburg (from Blue Bulls); (substituted on) Victor Matfield (unattached); (substituted on) Marvin Orie (from Blue Bulls)	David Bulbring (did not play); Grant Hattingh; Nico Janse van Rensburg; Victor Matfield; Marvin Orie; Flip van der Merwe; Paul Willemse
FL	Arno Botha; Jacques du Plessis; Dewald Potgieter; Jacques Potgieter; Deon Stegmann	(substituted off) Jacques Potgieter (to (Australia) Waratahs)	(substituted on) Wiaan Liebenberg (from Blue Bulls); (substituted on) Roelof Smit (from Blue Bulls); (substituted on) Wimpie van der Walt (from Southern Kings)	Arno Botha (did not play); Jacques du Plessis; Wiaan Liebenberg; Dewald Potgieter (short-term); Roelof Smit; Deon Stegmann; Wimpie van der Walt (short-term)
N8	Jean Cook; Jono Ross; Pierre Spies	(substituted off) Jean Cook (to Cheetahs)	(substituted on) Jacques Engelbrecht (from Southern Kings)	Jacques Engelbrecht; Jono Ross; Pierre Spies
SH	Francois Hougaard; Rudy Paige; Ruan Snyman (did not play); Jano Vermaak	(substituted off) Ruan Snyman (to (France) Racing Métro); (substituted off) Jano Vermaak (to (France) Toulouse)	(substituted on) Piet van Zyl (from Cheetahs)	Francois Hougaard; Rudy Paige; Piet van Zyl
FH	Louis Fouché; Morné Steyn	(substituted off) Morné Steyn (to (France) Stade Français)	(substituted on) Handré Pollard (from Blue Bulls); (substituted on) Jacques-Louis Potgieter (from (France) Dax)	Louis Fouché; Handré Pollard; Jacques-Louis Potgieter
CE	JJ Engelbrecht; Wynand Olivier; Jan Serfontein; Francois Venter	(substituted off) Wynand Olivier (to (France) Montpellier); (substituted off) Francois Venter (to Cheetahs)	(substituted on) Waylon Murray (from Southern Kings); (substituted on) William Small-Smith (from Blue Bulls)	JJ Engelbrecht; Waylon Murray (did not play); Jan Serfontein; William Small-Smith
WG	Bjorn Basson; Lionel Mapoe (short-term); Sampie Mastriet; Akona Ndungane	(substituted off) Lionel Mapoe (returned to Lions)	(substituted on) Travis Ismaiel (from Blue Bulls)	Bjorn Basson; Travis Ismaiel (did not play); Sampie Mastriet; Akona Ndungane
FB	Ulrich Beyers; Zane Kirchner; Jurgen Visser	(substituted off) Zane Kirchner (to (Ireland) Leinster)	(substituted on) Clayton Blommetjies (from Blue Bulls); (substituted on) Jesse Kriel (from Blue Bulls)	Ulrich Beyers; Clayton Blommetjies (did not play); Jesse Kriel; Jurgen Visser
Coach	Frans Ludeke			Frans Ludeke

=== Cheetahs ===
Cheetahs transfers 2013–14
Pos	2013 squad	Out	In	2014 squad
PR	Lourens Adriaanse; Rossouw de Klerk (did not play); Trevor Nyakane; Caylib Oosthuizen (did not play); Coenie Oosthuizen	(substituted off) Lourens Adriaanse (to Sharks)	(substituted on) Luan de Bruin (from Free State Cheetahs); (substituted on) Nick Schonert (from Griquas); (substituted on) Kevin Stevens (from Free State Cheetahs); (substituted on) Maks van Dyk (from Sharks (Currie Cup))	Luan de Bruin; Rossouw de Klerk; Trevor Nyakane; Caylib Oosthuizen; Coenie Oosthuizen; Nick Schonert (did not play); Kevin Stevens; Maks van Dyk
HK	Ryno Barnes; Hercú Liebenberg (did not play); Adriaan Strauss		(substituted on) Martin Bezuidenhout (from Stormers); (substituted on) Torsten van Jaarsveld (from Free State Cheetahs)	Ryno Barnes; Martin Bezuidenhout (did not play); Hercú Liebenberg (did not play); Adriaan Strauss; Torsten van Jaarsveld
LK	Lood de Jager; Andries Ferreira (did not play); Ligtoring Landman; Francois Uys; Waltie Vermeulen		(substituted on) Hilton Lobberts (from Griquas); (substituted on) Boela Serfontein (from Pumas); (substituted on) Carl Wegner (from (France) Stade Français)	Lood de Jager; Andries Ferreira; Ligtoring Landman; Hilton Lobberts; Boela Serfontein; Francois Uys; Waltie Vermeulen; Carl Wegner
FL	Heinrich Brüssow; Lappies Labuschagné; Boom Prinsloo; Philip van der Walt; Frans Viljoen	(substituted off) Frans Viljoen (to (France) Lyon)	(substituted on) Carel Greeff (from Griquas); (substituted on) Oupa Mohojé (from Free State Cheetahs); (substituted on) Henco Venter (from Free State Cheetahs)	Heinrich Brüssow; Carel Greeff; Lappies Labuschagné; Oupa Mohojé; Boom Prinsloo; Philip van der Walt; Henco Venter
N8	Davon Raubenheimer (did not play)	(substituted off) Davon Raubenheimer (to SWD Eagles)	(substituted on) Jean Cook (from Bulls)	Jean Cook
SH	Tewis de Bruyn; Sarel Pretorius; Piet van Zyl	(substituted off) Tewis de Bruyn (retired); (substituted off) Piet van Zyl (to Bulls)	(substituted on) Renier Botha (from Free State Cheetahs); (substituted on) Kevin Luiters (from Free State Cheetahs); (substituted on) Tian Meyer (from Sharks); (substituted on) Shaun Venter (from Southern Kings)	Renier Botha (did not play); Kevin Luiters (did not play); Tian Meyer; Sarel Pretorius; Shaun Venter
FH	Francois Brummer; Burton Francis; Johan Goosen; Hansie Graaff (did not play); Riaan Smit; Elgar Watts	(substituted off) Burton Francis (to Agen); (substituted off) Hansie Graaff (to Sharks)		Francois Brummer (did not play); Johan Goosen; Riaan Smit; Elgar Watts
CE	Robert Ebersohn; Barry Geel; Howard Mnisi; Johann Sadie	(substituted off) Robert Ebersohn (to (France) Montpellier); (substituted off) Barry Geel (to Rustenburg Impala)	(substituted on) Piet Lindeque (from Sharks); (substituted on) Francois Venter (from Bulls)	Piet Lindeque (did not play); Howard Mnisi; Johann Sadie; Francois Venter
WG	Rayno Benjamin; Rocco Jansen (did not play); Willie le Roux; Raymond Rhule		(substituted on) Cornal Hendricks (from South Africa Sevens)	Rayno Benjamin; Cornal Hendricks; Rocco Jansen (did not play); Willie le Roux; Raymond Rhule
FB	Hennie Daniller		(substituted on) Gouws Prinsloo (from Griquas)	Hennie Daniller; Gouws Prinsloo (did not play)
Coach	Naka Drotské			Naka Drotské

=== Kings ===
The Kings will be replaced in the 2014 Super Rugby season by the Lions. All players returned to the domestic Eastern Province Kings team unless stated.

Southern Kings transfers 2013–14
Pos	2013 squad	Out	In	2014 squad
PR	Kevin Buys; Charl du Plessis; Jaco Engels; Schalk Ferreira; Grant Kemp	(substituted off) Kevin Buys (to (France) Brive); (substituted off) Jaco Engels (to (Namibia) Wanderers); (substituted off) Schalk Ferreira (to (France) Toulouse); (substituted off) Grant Kemp (returned to SWD Eagles)	—N/a	—N/a
HK	Hannes Franklin; Virgile Lacombe; Bandise Maku; Edgar Marutlulle (short-term)	(substituted off) Hannes Franklin (to SWD Eagles); (substituted off) Virgile Lacombe (to (France) Racing Métro); (substituted off) Bandise Maku (to Bulls); (substituted off) Edgar Marutlulle (returned to Leopards)	—N/a	—N/a
LK	Daniel Adongo; Rynier Bernardo; David Bulbring; Thabo Mamojele; Darron Nell; Steven Sykes	(substituted off) Daniel Adongo (to (United States) Indianapolis Colts); (substituted off) Rynier Bernardo (to (Wales) Ospreys); (substituted off) David Bulbring (to Bulls); (substituted off) Thabo Mamojele (to Lions)	—N/a	—N/a
FL	Aidon Davis; Cornell du Preez; Tomás Leonardi; Mpho Mbiyozo; Devin Oosthuizen; Wimpie van der Walt	(substituted off) Cornell du Preez (to (Scotland) Edinburgh); (substituted off) Tomás Leonardi (to (Argentina) S.I.C.); (substituted off) Mpho Mbiyozo (retired); (substituted off) Wimpie van der Walt (to (Japan) NTT DoCoMo Red Hurricanes)	—N/a	—N/a
N8	Jacques Engelbrecht; Luke Watson	(substituted off) Jacques Engelbrecht (to Bulls)	—N/a	—N/a
SH	Johan Herbst; Shaun Venter (short-term); Nicolás Vergallo	(substituted off) Johan Herbst (returned to SWD Eagles); (substituted off) Shaun Venter (to Cheetahs); (substituted off) Nicolás Vergallo (to (France) Lyon)	—N/a	—N/a
FH	Demetri Catrakilis; Shane Gates; George Whitehead	(substituted off) Demetri Catrakilis (to Stormers)	—N/a	—N/a
CE	Ronnie Cooke; Waylon Murray; Hadleigh Parkes; Andries Strauss; Scott van Breda	(substituted off) Waylon Murray (to Bulls); (substituted off) Hadleigh Parkes (to (New Zealand) Hurricanes); (substituted off) Andries Strauss (to (Scotland) Edinburgh)	—N/a	—N/a
WG	Siyanda Grey; Michael Killian; Sergeal Petersen; Marcello Sampson	(substituted off) Marcello Sampson (to Pumas)	—N/a	—N/a
FB	SP Marais; Siviwe Soyizwapi; Elric van Vuuren	(substituted off) SP Marais (to Sharks (Currie Cup)); (substituted off) Elric van Vuuren (returned to SWD Eagles)	—N/a	—N/a
Coach	Alan Solomons	(substituted off) Alan Solomons (to (Scotland) Edinburgh)	—N/a	—N/a

=== Lions ===
The Lions joined the 2014 Super Rugby season at the expense of the Kings. All players joined from Golden Lions unless stated.

Lions transfers 2013–14
Pos	2013 squad	Out	In	2014 squad
PR	—N/a	—N/a	(substituted on) Corné Fourie (from Pumas); (substituted on) Charles Marais (from Griffons); (substituted on) Schalk van der Merwe (from Free State Cheetahs)	Ruan Dreyer; Corné Fourie; Charles Marais; Julian Redelinghuys; Schalk van der Merwe; Jacques van Rooyen
HK	—N/a	—N/a	(substituted on) Akker van der Merwe (from Leopards); (substituted on) Willie Wepener (from Bulls)	Robbie Coetzee; Malcolm Marx; Mark Pretorius; Akker van der Merwe; Willie Wepener
LK	—N/a	—N/a	(substituted on) MB Lusaseni (from Leopards); (substituted on) Rudi Mathee (from Pumas); (substituted on) Franco van der Merwe (returned from Sharks)	MB Lusaseni; Rudi Mathee; Franco Mostert; Martin Muller; Franco van der Merwe
FL	—N/a	—N/a	(substituted on) Derick Minnie (returned from Sharks)	Willie Britz; Stephan de Wit; Jaco Kriel; Derick Minnie; Warren Whiteley
N8	—N/a	—N/a		Warwick Tecklenburg
SH	—N/a	—N/a	(substituted on) Faf de Klerk (from Pumas)	Michael Bondesio (did not play); Ross Cronjé; Faf de Klerk
FH	—N/a	—N/a	(substituted on) Elton Jantjies (returned from Stormers)	Marnitz Boshoff; Elton Jantjies
CE	—N/a	—N/a	(substituted on) JW Jonker (unattached); (substituted on) Lionel Mapoe (returned from Bulls); (substituted on) Stefan Watermeyer (from Pumas)	Stokkies Hanekom; Alwyn Hollenbach; JW Jonker; Lionel Mapoe; Stefan Watermeyer
WG	—N/a	—N/a	(substituted on) Courtnall Skosan (from Blue Bulls)	Chrysander Botha; Deon Helberg (did not play); Courtnall Skosan; Deon van Rensburg; Anthony Volmink
FB	—N/a	—N/a	(substituted on) Andries Coetzee (returned from Sharks); (substituted on) Coenie van Wyk (from Pumas)	Andries Coetzee; Ruan Combrinck; Coenie van Wyk
Coach	—N/a	—N/a		Johan Ackermann

=== Sharks ===
Sharks transfers 2013–14
Pos	2013 squad	Out	In	2014 squad
PR	Dale Chadwick (did not play); Allan Dell (did not play); Jannie du Plessis; Wiehahn Herbst; JC Janse van Rensburg (short-term); Danie Mienie; Tendai Mtawarira	(substituted off) Allan Dell (to (Scotland) Edinburgh); (substituted off) JC Janse van Rensburg (returned to Lions); (substituted off) Danie Mienie (to Sharks (Currie Cup))	(substituted on) Lourens Adriaanse (from Cheetahs); (substituted on) Thomas du Toit (from Western Province)	Lourens Adriaanse; Dale Chadwick; Jannie du Plessis; Thomas du Toit; Wiehahn Herbst; Tendai Mtawarira
HK	Craig Burden; Kyle Cooper; Bismarck du Plessis; Monde Hadebe (did not play)	(substituted off) Craig Burden (to (France) Toulon)	(substituted on) Franco Marais (from Sharks (Currie Cup))	Kyle Cooper; Bismarck du Plessis; Monde Hadebe (did not play); Franco Marais
LK	Anton Bresler; Pieter-Steph du Toit; Edwin Hewitt; Jandré Marais; Peet Marais (did not play); Franco van der Merwe (short-term)	(substituted off) Edwin Hewitt (to Sharks (Currie Cup)); (substituted off) Jandré Marais (to (France) Bordeaux); (substituted off) Franco van der Merwe (returned to Lions)	(substituted on) Stephan Lewies (from Sharks (Currie Cup)); (substituted on) Etienne Oosthuizen (from (Australia) Brumbies)	Anton Bresler; Pieter-Steph du Toit; Stephan Lewies; Peet Marais; Etienne Oosthuizen
FL	Willem Alberts; Jacques Botes; Marcell Coetzee; Jean Deysel; Derick Minnie (short-term); Tera Mtembu	(substituted off) Derick Minnie (returned to Lions)		Willem Alberts; Jacques Botes; Marcell Coetzee; Jean Deysel; Tera Mtembu
N8	Keegan Daniel; Ryan Kankowski			Keegan Daniel; Ryan Kankowski
SH	Charl McLeod; Tian Meyer (did not play); Cobus Reinach	(substituted off) Tian Meyer (to Golden Lions)	(substituted on) Stefan Ungerer (from Sharks (Currie Cup))	Charl McLeod; Cobus Reinach; Stefan Ungerer
FH	Butch James; Patrick Lambie; Fred Zeilinga	(substituted off) Butch James (retired)	(substituted on) Hansie Graaff (from Griffons); (substituted on) Tim Swiel (from Western Province)	Hansie Graaff (did not play); Patrick Lambie; Tim Swiel; Fred Zeilinga
CE	Meyer Bosman; Paul Jordaan; Piet Lindeque (short-term); François Steyn; Tim Whitehead (did not play)	(substituted off) Meyer Bosman (to (France) Stade Français); (substituted off) Piet Lindeque (to Cheetahs); (substituted off) Tim Whitehead (to Sharks (Currie Cup))	(substituted on) André Esterhuizen (from Sharks (Currie Cup)); (substituted on) Tyler Fisher (from Sharks (Currie Cup)); (substituted on) Heimar Williams (from Sharks (Currie Cup))	André Esterhuizen; Tyler Fisher (did not play); Paul Jordaan; François Steyn; Heimar Williams
WG	Lwazi Mvovo; Odwa Ndungane; JP Pietersen; Sean Robinson; S'bura Sithole	(substituted off) Sean Robinson (to Sharks (Currie Cup))	(substituted on) Tonderai Chavhanga (from (Wales) Newport Gwent Dragons)	Tonderai Chavhanga; Lwazi Mvovo; Odwa Ndungane; JP Pietersen; S'bura Sithole
FB	Andries Coetzee (short-term); Louis Ludik; Jaco van Tonder; Riaan Viljoen	(substituted off) Andries Coetzee (returned to Lions); (substituted off) Louis Ludik (to Agen); (substituted off) Riaan Viljoen (to (Japan) NTT DoCoMo Red Hurricanes)	(substituted on) SP Marais (from Southern Kings)	SP Marais; Jaco van Tonder
Coach	John Plumtree; Grant Bashford (caretaker); Hugh Reece-Edwards (caretaker)	(substituted off) John Plumtree (to Ireland) (forwards); (substituted off) Grant Bashford (to Northwood School); (substituted off) Hugh Reece-Edwards (to Rustenburg Impala)	(substituted on) Jake White (from (Australia) Brumbies)	Jake White

=== Stormers ===
Stormers transfers 2013–14
Pos	2013 squad	Out	In	2014 squad
PR	Deon Carstens (did not play); Pat Cilliers; Ross Geldenhuys (short-term, did not play); Brok Harris; Chris Heiberg (did not play); Steven Kitshoff; Frans Malherbe	(substituted off) Deon Carstens (retired); (substituted off) Ross Geldenhuys (returned to Eastern Province Kings); (substituted off) Chris Heiberg (to (Australia) Force)	(substituted on) Oli Kebble (from Western Province); (substituted on) Sti Sithole (from Western Province); (substituted on) Alistair Vermaak (from Western Province)	Pat Cilliers; Brok Harris; Oli Kebble; Steven Kitshoff; Frans Malherbe; Sti Sithole; Alistair Vermaak
HK	Martin Bezuidenhout (short-term); Deon Fourie; Tiaan Liebenberg; Scarra Ntubeni	(substituted off) Martin Bezuidenhout (returned to Lions)	(substituted on) Stephan Coetzee (from Western Province); (substituted on) Martin Dreyer (from Boland Cavaliers); (substituted on) Mike Willemse (from Western Province)	Stephan Coetzee; Martin Dreyer; Deon Fourie; Tiaan Liebenberg; Scarra Ntubeni; Mike Willemse
LK	Andries Bekker; Ruan Botha (did not play); Marius Coetzer (short-term); Eben Etzebeth; Gerbrandt Grobler; De Kock Steenkamp	(substituted off) Andries Bekker (to (Japan) Kobe Kobelco Steelers); (substituted off) Marius Coetzer (returned to Pumas); (substituted off) Gerbrandt Grobler (to Western Province)	(substituted on) Manuel Carizza (from (France) Racing Métro); (substituted on) Tazz Fuzani (from Western Province); (substituted on) Jean Kleyn (from Western Province); (substituted on) Jurie van Vuuren (from Western Province)	Ruan Botha; Manuel Carizza; Eben Etzebeth (did not play); Tazz Fuzani (did not play); Jean Kleyn; De Kock Steenkamp; Jurie van Vuuren
FL	Don Armand; Schalk Burger (did not play); Rynhardt Elstadt; Rohan Kitshoff; Siya Kolisi; Michael Rhodes	(substituted off) Don Armand (to (England) Exeter Chiefs)	(substituted on) Sikhumbuzo Notshe (from Western Province)	Schalk Burger; Rynhardt Elstadt; Rohan Kitshoff; Siya Kolisi; Sikhumbuzo Notshe; Michael Rhodes
N8	Nizaam Carr; Duane Vermeulen			Nizaam Carr; Duane Vermeulen
SH	Dewaldt Duvenage; Nic Groom; Louis Schreuder	(substituted off) Dewaldt Duvenage (to (France) Perpignan)	(substituted on) Dylon Frylinck (from Western Province); (substituted on) Godlen Masimla (from Western Province)	Dylon Frylinck; Nic Groom; Godlen Masimla (did not play); Louis Schreuder
FH	Kurt Coleman; Peter Grant; Elton Jantjies (short-term); Gary van Aswegen	(substituted off) Elton Jantjies (returned to Lions)	(substituted on) Demetri Catrakilis (from Southern Kings); (substituted on) Ryno Eksteen (from Western Province)	Demetri Catrakilis; Kurt Coleman; Ryno Eksteen; Peter Grant; Gary van Aswegen (did not play)
CE	Damian de Allende; Juan de Jongh; Jean de Villiers; Jaco Taute (short-term)		(substituted on) Michael van der Spuy (from Western Province)	Damian de Allende; Juan de Jongh; Jean de Villiers; Jaco Taute; Michael van der Spuy
WG	Gio Aplon; Bryan Habana; Gerhard van den Heever	(substituted off) Bryan Habana (to (France) Toulon); (substituted off) Gerhard van den Heever (to (Ireland) Munster)	(substituted on) Seabelo Senatla (from South Africa Sevens); (substituted on) Sailosi Tagicakibau (from (England) London Irish); (substituted on) Kobus van Wyk (from Western Province); (substituted on) Devon Williams (from Western Province)	Gio Aplon; Seabelo Senatla; Sailosi Tagicakibau (short-term); Kobus van Wyk; Devon Williams
FB	Cheslin Kolbe (did not play); Joe Pietersen	(substituted off) Joe Pietersen (to (France) Biarritz)		Cheslin Kolbe
Coach	Allister Coetzee			Allister Coetzee

== See also ==
- List of 2012–13 Super Rugby transfers
- List of 2014–15 Super Rugby transfers
- SANZAAR
- Super Rugby franchise areas
