= Ged Robinson =

New Zealand rugby union footballer

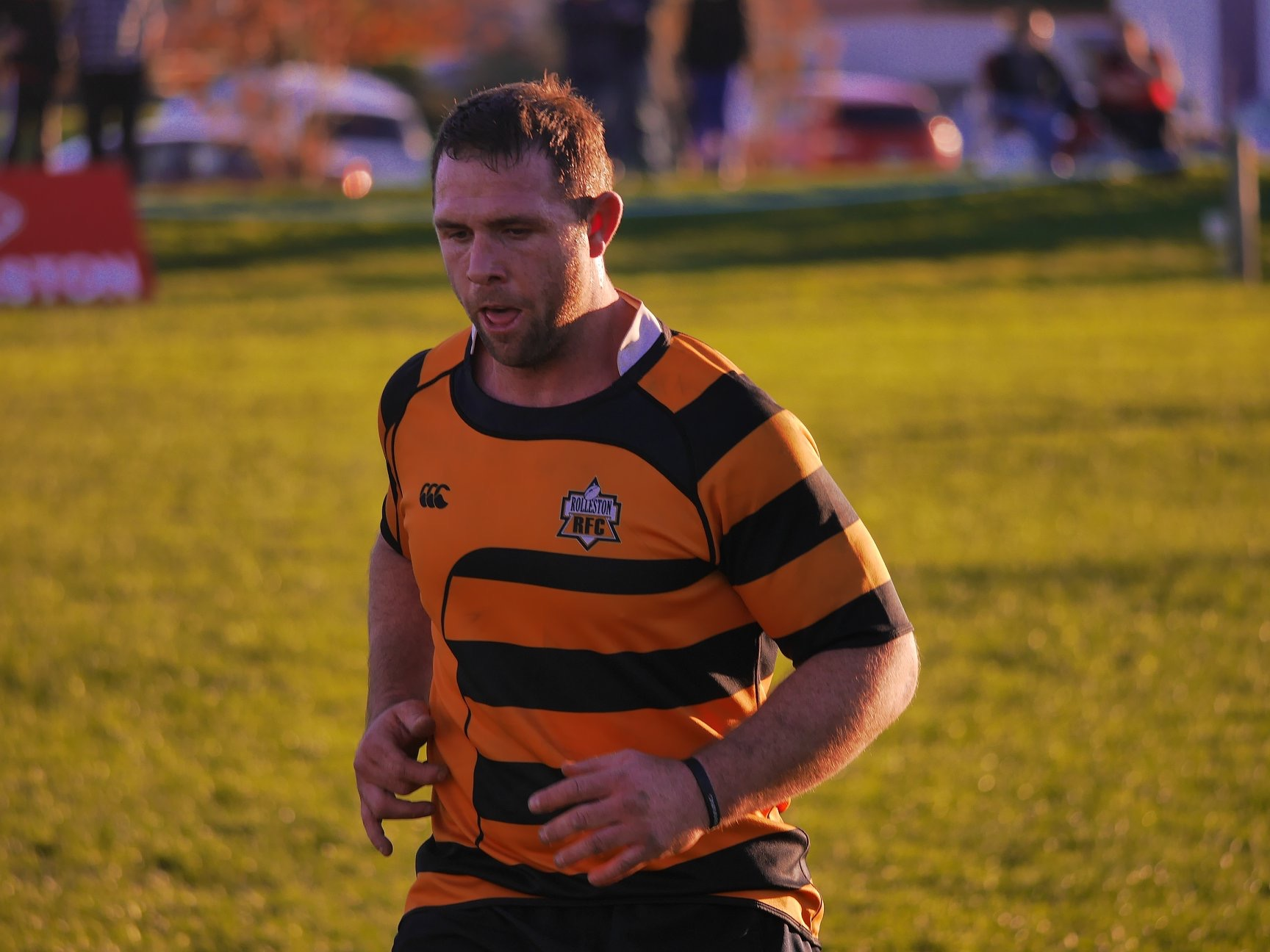
- Born: Ged Robinson; 20 June 1983 (age 43) Wellington, New Zealand
- Height: 1.78 m (5 ft 10 in)
- Weight: 105 kg (16 st 7 lb)

Rugby union career
- Position: Hooker
- Current team: Rolleston Div 1
Provincial / State sides
Years	Team	Apps	(Points)
2007	Manawatu	10	(0)
2008–10	Wellington	27	(10)
2013–14	Hawke's Bay	19	(0)
2015	Canterbury	9	(0)
- Correct as of 26 October 2015
Super Rugby
Years	Team	Apps	(Points)
2009	Hurricanes	5	(0)
2011–13	Melbourne Rebels	46	(35)
2014	Highlanders	15	(5)
2015–16	Crusaders	4	(0)
- Correct as of 23 July 2016

Ged Robinson (born 20 June 1983 in Wellington, New Zealand) is a rugby union footballer. His regular playing position is hooker. He formerly represented the Melbourne Rebels in Super Rugby, and he formerly played 5 games for the Hurricanes and mostly on the bench the Wellington Lions in New Zealand.

== Melbourne Rebels ==
In 2011, the Rebels first season in Super Rugby competition, Robinson played in every match. In 2012 he played 14 of a possible 16 games. He will leave the Rebels after the 2013 Super Rugby season to return to New Zealand and join ITM Cup side Hawke's Bay. He joins Rebels head coach Damien Hill and fellow Rebels players James O'Connor, Cooper Vuna, Gareth Delve, Nick Phipps, Nic Henderson, James King, Tim Davidson and Richard Kingi on the list of departing Rebels at the end of the 2013 season. His last game as a Rebels player was a home game against New Zealand franchise the Highlanders, a match that also turned out to be the last Rebels match for head coach Damien Hill and players James O'Connor, Cooper Vuna, Gareth Delve, Nick Phipps and Nic Henderson. In front of over 12,000 spectators, the Rebels overcame a 24-point half-time deficit to achieve a remarkable 38-37 come-from-behind victory over the Highlanders, ending Robinson's tenure as a Rebels player on a winning note.

== Highlanders ==
Robinson left Australia and moved to the Highlanders for the start of the 2014 Super Rugby season, where he came once again under the mentorship of former Wellington coach, Jamie Joseph.
