= Gareth Delve =

Wales rugby union footballer

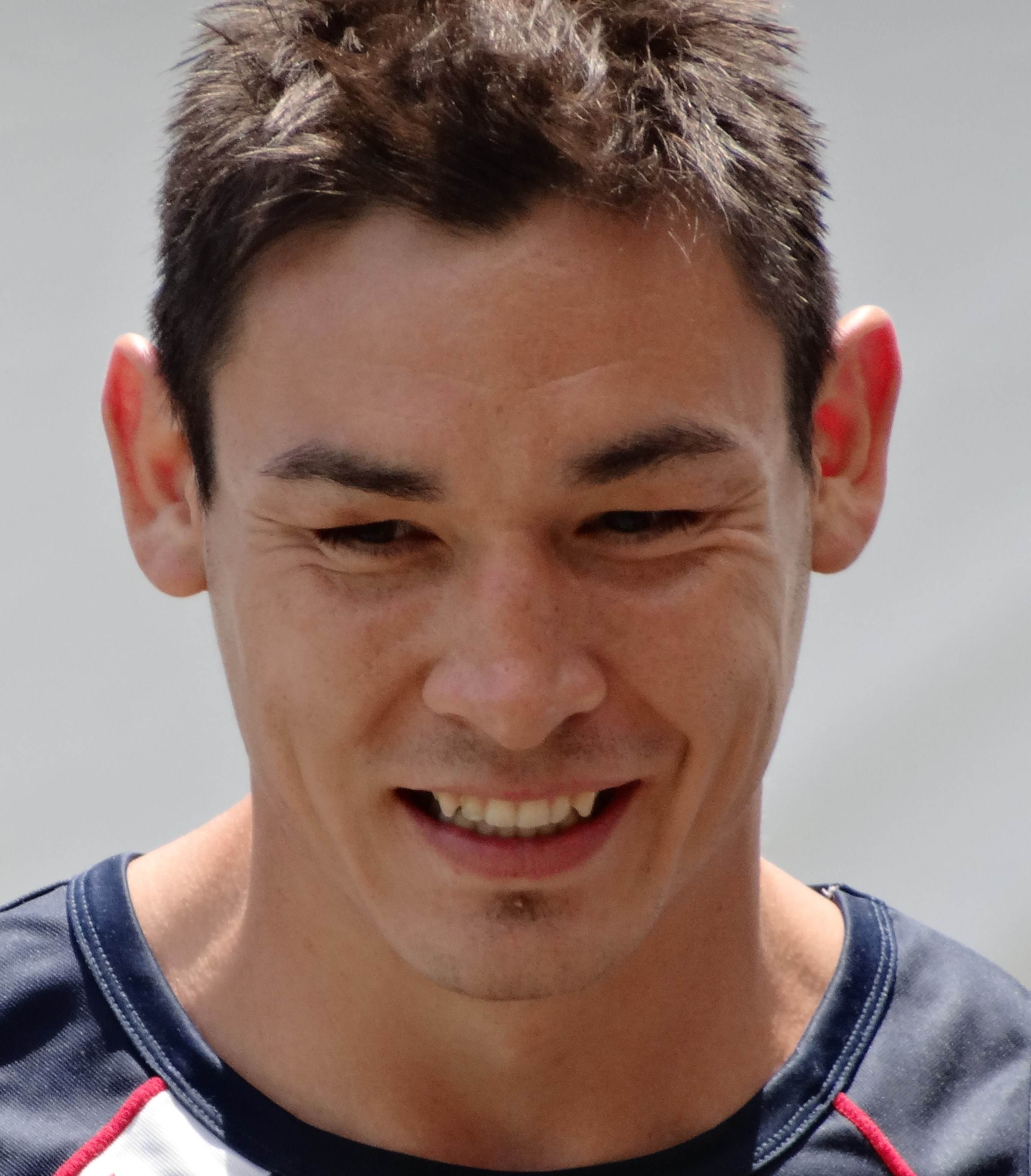
- Born: Gareth Leon Delve; 30 December 1982 (age 43) Cardiff, Wales
- Height: 6 ft 3 in (1.91 m)
- Weight: 116 kg (18 st 4 lb)
- School: Colston's Collegiate

Rugby union career
- Position: Number 8
- Current team: Ospreys
Senior career
Years	Team	Apps	(Points)
2001–07	Bath Rugby	64	(20)
2007–10	Gloucester Rugby	56	(20)
2011–13	Melbourne Rebels	44	(20)
2013–15	NEC Green Rockets	10	(5)
2015–16	Ospreys	2	(0)
- Correct as of 17 October 2015
International career
Years	Team	Apps	(Points)
2006–10	Wales	11	(5)

Gareth Leon Delve (born 30 December 1982) is a former Wales international rugby union player. Having started his career playing rugby in the English Premiership Rugby from 2001, he became a captain of Gloucester. Then, in late 2010, he moved to Australia where he went on to captain the Melbourne Rebels, as well as later playing in Japan. He returned to play his final season for the Swansea Ospreys, before retiring from professional rugby in 2016, his usual position was number 8. Since retirement he has completed an MSc in university, and had become part of backroom staff in Bristol and then Gloucester, where since 2022 he became the academy manager.

== Career ==
=== Wales and England ===
Delve was a pupil at Rumney High School in Cardiff and accepted a Rugby scholarship from Colston's Collegiate School in Bristol before signing a professional contract with Bath in 2001.

After a few frustrating seasons at Bath, he was named in the Welsh squad for the 2006 Six Nations Championship, and earned two caps during the tournament, making his debut against Scotland. He was also called up for the summer tour to Argentina in June 2006, and earned another two caps, as well as scoring a try in the second Test.

In the summer of 2007, he moved from Bath to Gloucester Rugby. He was appointed joint captain of Gloucester in 2009, a position he held in 2010 before he moved to Australia.

In March 2010, he was recalled to the Wales squad and selected in the starting line-up for the match versus Ireland. He was named in the preliminary squad for the 2011 Rugby World Cup but was ultimately left out of the final squad.

=== Australia ===
In March 2010, Delve signed with the newly formed Melbourne Rebels, and joined the team in October, in preparation for their inaugural 2011 Super Rugby season. The move to Melbourne saw Delve reconnect with former Bath Forwards Coach Mark Bakewell. Although there had been speculation that Delve might play blindside flanker, he became the Rebels regular No.8. In February 2011, Delve was appointed the Rebels' vice-captain, deputy to former Wallaby captain Stirling Mortlock. In Round 9 of the 2011 season, Delve became the first overseas player to captain an Australian Super Rugby side (v. Highlanders, in Melbourne).

In 2011, Delve earned a call-up to the initial 45-man Welsh World Cup squad, training in Spala, Poland. He missed the first training session due to Rebels duties. He was to join the squad after the final games for the Rebels against the Western Force.

In June 2012, he re-signed with the Rebels for 2013. Rebels CEO Steven Boland said Delve had been a wonderful ambassador for the Rebels. "His leadership has also been outstanding and given the upcoming retirement of our Captain Stirling Mortlock, Gareth will once again be an important part of our leadership group next year."

In May 2013, it was announced that Delve would leave the Rebels at the end of the season, along with head coach Damien Hill and fellow Rebels players James O'Connor, Cooper Vuna, Ged Robinson, Nick Phipps, Nic Henderson, James King, Tim Davidson and Richard Kingi. His last game as a Rebels player was a home game against New Zealand franchise the Highlanders, a match that also turned out to be the last Rebels match for head coach Damien Hill and players James O'Connor, Cooper Vuna, Ged Robinson, Nick Phipps and Nic Henderson. In front of over 12,000 spectators, the Rebels overcame a 24-point half-time deficit to achieve a remarkable 38–37 come-from-behind victory over the Highlanders, ending Delve's tenure as a Rebels player on a winning note.

=== Japan ===
It had been speculated in the Australian press that Delve would continue his rugby union career in Japan. It was officially confirmed that Delve would join NEC Green Rockets in the Japanese Top League for the next season.

=== Return to the UK ===
On 27 March 2015, it was announced Delve had signed a two-year contract with Welsh region Ospreys. He was released from his contract one year later.

== Managerial career ==
After retiring from rugby, Delve continued his involvement with rugby, and in 2017, he became the Bristol Bears Team Manager for the 2017/18 season. During this period, Delve also completed an MSc in Management at Swansea University. His tenure with Bristol was for two seasons and he departed in 2019. Since November 2022, Delve had rejoined Gloucester as their new Academy Manager.

== Personal life ==
Delve's parents are Steve Delve, a former prop and competitive bodybuilder, and Dolan Delve, née Taylor; both of whom are from Wales. When asked to describe some of his proudest moments, he replied that one was when "I [gave] my match jersey to my grandfather before he passed away so that was absolutely massive for me and something I'll always remember."

=== Melbourne incident ===
Late in 2010, while house hunting in Melbourne with his partner, Delve chanced upon a man allegedly assaulting a woman and attempting to push her into a car. It's alleged that the man attacked Delve, and was knocked to the ground. Delve called the police. The Melbourne Age hinted Delve behaved like a superhero, but to Delve "The good thing was that he started being aggressive towards me instead of towards the woman ... the way I was brought up you don't like seeing things like that happen. In the situation, it felt like the right thing to step in."
