= Cooper Vuna =

Australia & Tonga international rugby player

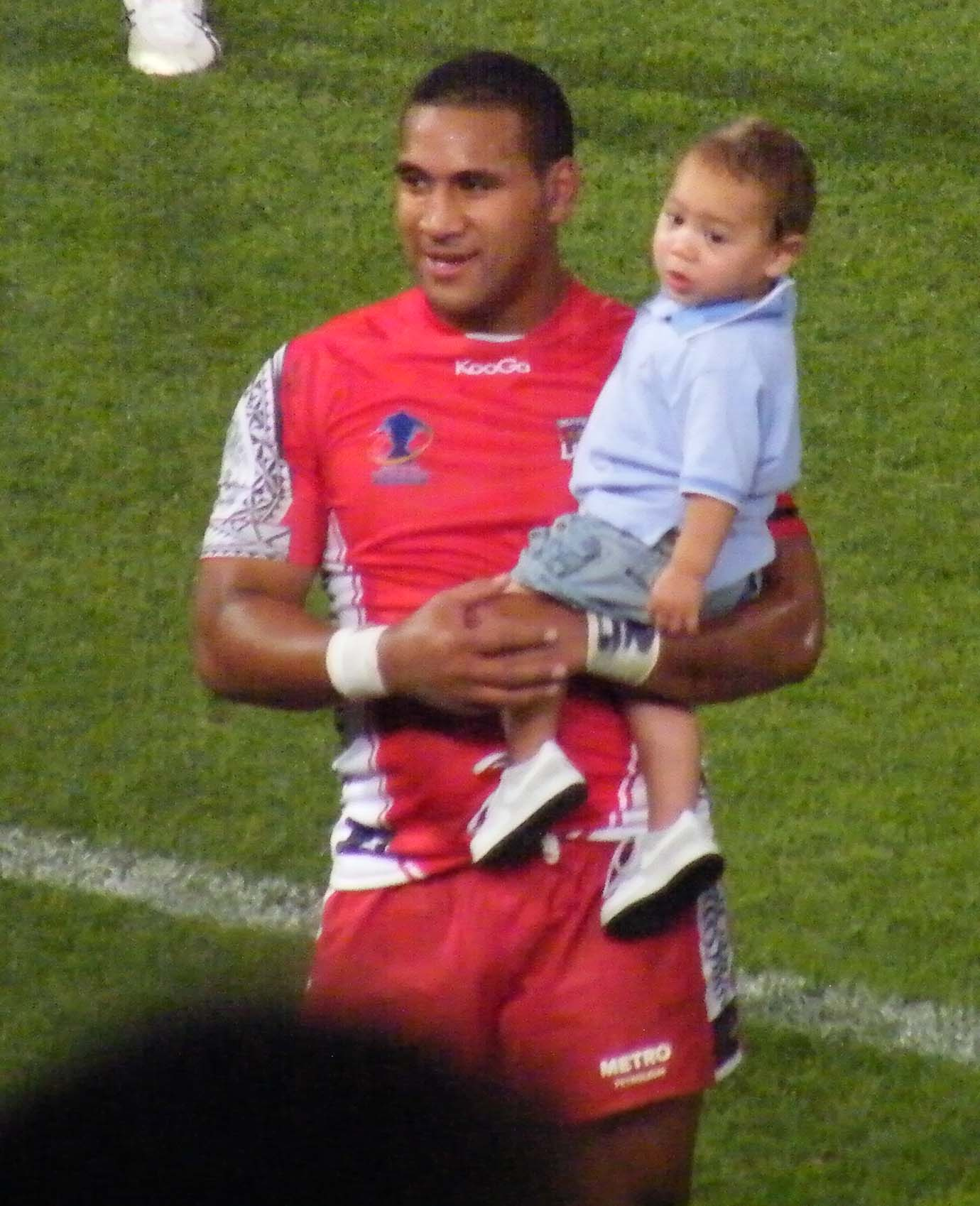

Personal information
- Born: Kerry Cooper Vuna; 7 May 1987 (age 39) Auckland, New Zealand
- Height: 1.80 m (5 ft 11 in)
- Weight: 98 kg (15 st 6 lb)

Playing information
- Position: Wing
Club
Years	Team	Pld	T	G	FG	P
2004–06	New Zealand Warriors	5	1	0	0	4
2007–10	Newcastle Knights	54	35	0	0	140
	Total	59	36	0	0	144
Representative
Years	Team	Pld	T	G	FG	P
2008	Tonga	4	4	0	0	16

Rugby union career
- Position: Wing
Senior career
Years	Team	Apps	(Points)
2011–2013	Rebels	36	(65)
2013–2015	Toshiba Brave Lupus	18	(20)
2015–2017	Worcester Warriors	39	(95)
2018–2019	Bath Rugby	20	(20)
2019–2021	Newcastle Falcons	7	(5)
- Correct as of 6 August 2021
International career
Years	Team	Apps	(Points)
2012	Australia	2	(0)
2016–2021	Tonga	16	(10)
- Correct as of 6 August 2021

Kerry Cooper Vuna (born 7 May 1987) is a professional rugby footballer who plays on the wing for Newcastle Falcons in Premiership Rugby. He played rugby league as a wing for the New Zealand Warriors and Newcastle Knights in the National Rugby League competition, before switching to rugby union to play Super Rugby for the Melbourne Rebels.

== Early years ==
Cooper Vuna is of Tongan descent. He was born in Auckland, New Zealand, and grew up in Otahuhu with his family. He has three sisters and five brothers including his oldest sisters son, Joseph Vuna.

Vuna played high school rugby union until he was 15, switching to rugby league after being scouted by the New Zealand Warriors. His junior club was the Otahuhu Leopards. And he represented the Auckland Lions in the Bartercard Cup and NSWRL Premier League.

== Rugby league career ==
Vuna signed with the New Zealand Warriors and made his first grade debut late in 2004, in Round 24 against the Parramatta Eels. Vuna went on to play five games for the club over the next three years before leaving, seeking regular game time.

Vuna signed with the Newcastle Knights in mid-2007, seeking to break into first grade. He was picked in the Knights' squad the week he was signed after the squad suffered several withdrawals. Vuna established himself in the Knights first grade squad, playing in over fifty matches for the club between 2007 and 2010.

In Round 24, 2010 Vuna scored 4 tries against the Brisbane Broncos equalling the Newcastle Knights' club record for most tries in a game.

=== Representative career ===
Vuna was selected in the New Zealand national rugby league team' training squad in 2007 but did not make the final squad.

Vuna was also named in the Kiwis' 2008 squad training for the World Cup but played in three matches for Tonga instead. In October 2008 he was named in the final 24-man Tonga squad.

In 2011 Cooper was named in the initial 50-man squad for the Tongan Rugby Union Team for the Rugby World Cup.

== Rugby union career ==
In May 2010, Vuna signed a two-year contract with the Melbourne Rebels. He played the Rebels' pre-season trials against Tonga and Fiji; against the Crusaders he ran on with former Wallabies Stirling Mortlock and Julian Huxley. He debuted in Super Rugby for the first round of the Rebels season against the Waratahs. He ended the season playing 14 games of the Super Rugby season 2011 and scored 4 tries.

Vuna played his first game for Australia 9 June 2012, against Wales in Brisbane. Vuna played 71 minutes of the Test, the first of a series of three between Wallabies and the visiting Welshmen. Vuna was selected again for the second test, in Melbourne a week later.

In August 2012, Vuna dislocated his shoulder while playing for the Endeavour Hills club. A week later he underwent surgery. According to a Wallabies spokesman, Vuna could expect to face a six-month recovery period. This could see him sidelined until February 2013.

In May 2013, it was announced that Vuna would leave the Rebels at the end of the season to join Japanese Top League club Toshiba Brave Lupus. He joins head coach Damien Hill and fellow Rebels players James O'Connor, Gareth Delve, Ged Robinson, Nick Phipps, Nic Henderson, James King, Tim Davidson and Richard Kingi on the list of departing Rebels at the end of 2013. His last game as a Rebels player was a home game against New Zealand franchise the Highlanders, a match that also turned out to be the last Rebels match for head coach Damien Hill and players James O'Connor, Gareth Delve, Ged Robinson, Nick Phipps and Nic Henderson. In front of over 12,000 spectators, the Rebels overcame a 24-point half-time deficit to achieve a remarkable 38–37 come-from-behind victory over the Highlanders, ending Vuna's tenure as a Rebels player on a winning note, with Vuna scoring two tries in the same match.

On 2 March 2015, Vuna travelled to England to join Worcester Warriors in the Premiership Rugby with immediate effect from the 2015–16 season. Following his release from Worcester, Vuna signed for local rivals Bath for the 2018–19 season.

On 26 June 2019, Vuna signed for Premiership rivals Newcastle Falcons on a two-year deal from the 2019–20 season.

== Family ==
His father, John Vuna, represented Tonga in rugby union. He has a son called Lincoln Vuna
