= Tim Buchanan =

Tim Buchanan may refer to:

- Tim Buchanan (American football) (born 1946), Cincinnati Bengals linebacker
- Tim Buchanan (rugby union) (born 1988), Australian rugby union player
