= Jack Slater =

Jack Slater may also refer to:

- Jack Slater, a character in the film Last Action Hero, played by Arnold Schwarzenegger
- Jack Slater (politician) (1927–1997), Australian politician
- Jack Slater (rugby union), South African international rugby union player
- Jackie Slater (born 1954), retired National Football League player
