= Boela Serfontein =

South African rugby union player

- Full name: Willem Jacob Serfontein
- Born: 16 September 1988 (age 38) Port Elizabeth, South Africa
- Height: 1.98 m (6 ft 6 in)
- Weight: 111 kg (17 st 7 lb; 245 lb)
- School: Framesby High School
- University: UNISA
- Notable relative(s): Jan Serfontein (brother); Boelie Serfontein (father); Jack Slater (grandfather)

Rugby union career
- Position: Lock
Youth career
- 2005–2006: Eastern Province Kings
Senior career
Years	Team	Apps	(Points)
2008–2009	Blue Bulls	8	(5)
2010–2013	Pumas	62	(5)
2014	Griquas	10	(5)
2014–2016	Cheetahs	3	(0)
2015–2016	Free State Cheetahs	4	(0)
2015–2017	Griffons	20	(5)
2016	Free State XV	1	(0)
- Correct as of 3 June 2018
International career
Years	Team	Apps	(Points)
2012	South African Barbarians (North)	1	(0)
- Correct as of 22 November 2013

Willem Jacob 'Boela' Serfontein (born 16 September 1988) is a South African rugby union footballer who last played for the Griffons in Currie Cup rugby. He plays mostly as a lock.

== Career ==
He represents Free State Cheetahs in the Currie Cup and Vodacom Cup having previously played for the Blue Bulls, the Pumas and Griquas.

After spending four seasons with the Pumas – making 62 appearances - he joined Griquas for the 2014 season.

He made his Super Rugby debut for the Cheetahs in Bloemfontein against the Force on 10 May 2014, coming on midway through the second half.

In August 2014, it was announced that he would make join the Free State Cheetahs from 2015 onwards.

== Personal ==
He is the older brother of Blue Bulls and South Africa centre Jan Serfontein. His father Boelie was also a provincial rugby player, playing as a number eight for Eastern Province, and his grandfather was Jack Slater, a former Springbok winger.
