= Damien Hill =

Australian rugby union coach

- Born: Australia
- University: University of Sydney

Rugby union career
Senior career
Years	Team	Apps	(Points)
- Sydney University
Coaching career
- Years: Team
- 2002–2006: Suntory Sungoliath (Backs coach)
- 2005–2009: Sydney University
- 2011: Rebels (Assistant coach)
- 2012–2013: Rebels
- 2014–: Ricoh Black Rams

Damien Hill is a three-time Shute Shield winning coach, and was formerly the head coach of the Melbourne Rebels Super Rugby franchise. Initially appointed as an assistant coach with the club in 2011, Hill was appointed head coach after the resignation of inaugural Rebels coach Rod Macqueen at the end of 2011. He is currently the head coach of Japanese side Ricoh Black Rams in the Top League.

Raised in Wagga Wagga, New South Wales, Hill was a successful player of Australian rules football at a junior level and played in the Teal Cup for NSW Country. Educated at Sacred Heart and St Michael's Primary Schools and Trinity Senior High School, Hill began studying law at Sydney University but completed a degree in sports science (coaching) at the University of Canberra.

== Early years ==
As a boy, Hill lived in the Riverina city of Wagga Wagga and watched his father coach Wagga City, a team in the Southern Inland Rugby Union.

Hill played Rugby Union for both the Wagga City and Rivcoll Red Devils clubs in Wagga Wagga. He also played Australian Football, Rugby League and Soccer, and achieved state representative honours in all three codes.

== Coaching career ==
Hill joined the ACT Brumbies as a development officer In 1999. Under Eddie Jones, Hill progressed into coaching development and then became manager of coaching and development in 2000.

He left the Brumbies, and moved to the Suntory Rugby Club in Japan, where he became coaching coordinator and backs coach. He stayed for three years under head coach Yuji Nagatomo.

In 2006, Hill became the director of coaching at Sydney University and then head coach. Under Hill's tenure Sydney University won three consecutive premierships. The high standard of Hill's coaching prompted Wallabies coach Robbie Deans to declare Sydney University as good as any side in the New Zealand ITM Cup.

In 2011, Hill was appointed assistant coach of the newly founded Melbourne Rebels Super Rugby franchise. He was elevated to head coach at the end of the season, after former Wallabies head coach, and inaugural Rebels head coach Rod Macqueen resigned at the end of the season.

In his first year as head coach of the Rebels, the Rebels finished in 13th place on the Super Rugby overall standings, and finished 4th in the Australian Conference. The Rebels finished the season with a 4–12 win–loss record, with the Rebels achieving wins over the Blues and the Crusaders, as well as achieving two wins over follow Australian side the Western Force in the same season. At that time, it was the Rebels' win–loss record and best finish to a Super Rugby season, a record that was bettered the following season.

In his second and final year as head coach of the Rebels, the Rebels finished in 12th place on the Super Rugby overall standings, and finished 4th in the Australian Conference. The Rebels finished the season with a 5–11 win–loss record, with the Rebels achieving wins over the Stormers, the Highlanders and fellow Australian side the Waratahs, as well as achieving two wins over follow Australian side the Western Force in the same season. This is the Rebels' best win–loss record and best finish to a Super Rugby season to date.

In July 2013, Hill was informed that the 2013 Super Rugby season would be his last as head coach of the Melbourne Rebels, and that he would be replaced by Wallabies coaching co-ordinator Tony McGahan at the end of the season. Hill's last game as Rebels coach was a home game against New Zealand franchise the Highlanders, a match that also turned out to be the last Rebels match for players James O'Connor, Gareth Delve, Cooper Vuna, Ged Robinson, Nick Phipps and Nic Henderson. In front of over 12,000 spectators, the Rebels overcame a 24-point half-time deficit to achieve a remarkable 38-37 come-from-behind victory over the Highlanders, ending Hill's tenure as Rebels coach on a winning note.

== Influences ==
Hill acknowledges the influence of his idol former Australian football coach Tom Hafey: "Tommy Hafey was exceptional … He was definitely a disciplined person. He doesn't have to be told what to do. He just does it because he believes in it. I remember some of the things he organised that were virtually unheard of elsewhere". Hill also cited the influence of former Sydney Swans coach Paul Kelly, saying "What he was able to achieve at the Swans was exceptional ... and it seems to be an ongoing legacy. He wasn't one of those coaches who gets in, does what's best for him at the time and then leaves - and leaves nothing."
