= Walter Phipps (rugby union) =

Australia international rugby union player (1908–1987)

- Born: Walter James Flower Phipps; 31 January 1908 Moss Vale, New South Wales
- Died: c. 1987
- School: Sydney Grammar School

Rugby union career
- Position: hooker
International career
Years	Team	Apps	(Points)
1928	Wallabies	1	(0)

Walter James Flower Phipps (31 January 1908 – c. 1987) was a rugby union player who represented Australia.

Phipps, a hooker, was born in Moss Vale, New South Wales and claimed 1 international rugby cap for Australia.
