= Stephan van der Walt =

- Born: Stephan van der Walt; 21 April 1991 (age 35) Klerksdorp, South Africa
- Height: 1.92 m (6 ft 3 1/2 in)
- Weight: 92 kg (14 st 7 lb)
- School: Northside Christian College, Brisbane
- University: University of Queensland

Rugby union career
- Position: Centre / Wing
Senior career
Years	Team	Apps	(Points)
2015-	Queensland Country	0	
Super Rugby
Years	Team	Apps	(Points)
2013–	Brumbies	0	(0)
- Correct as of 30 October 2012

Stephan van der Walt (born 21 April 1991 in Klerksdorp, South Africa) is a rugby union player who plays as either an outside-centre or winger for Japanese Top East League side Tokyo Gas.

In October 2012, Van der Walt was named in the Brumbies Extended Playing Squad for the 2013 Super Rugby season.
