= Wilhelm Steenkamp =

South African rugby union player

- Born: Jabez Wilhelmus Steenkamp; 7 February 1985 (age 41) Williston Northern Cape, South Africa
- Height: 2.00 m (6 ft 6 1/2 in)
- Weight: 110 kg (17 st 5 lb; 243 lb)
- School: Paarl Boys' High School
- University: University of Pretoria
- Notable relative: De Kock Steenkamp (brother)

Rugby union career
- Position: Lock
Senior career
Years	Team	Apps	(Points)
2016–2017	Brive	29	(0)
Provincial / State sides
Years	Team	Apps	(Points)
2005–2010	Blue Bulls	66	(25)
2011	Free State Cheetahs	8	(5)
2012–2013	Blue Bulls	22	(0)
- Correct as of 13 October 2013
Super Rugby
Years	Team	Apps	(Points)
2007–2009	Bulls	18	(0)
2010	Sharks	5	(0)
2011	Cheetahs	13	(5)
2012–2013	Bulls	18	(0)
2014–present	Force	21	(0)
- Correct as of 12 June 2015

Wilhelm Steenkamp (born 7 February 1985) is a South African rugby union footballer. He plays as a Lock. He formerly played for the Cheetahs, Sharks, Bulls and the Australian Force all in Super Rugby. Later (in 2016–2017) he played for French rugby club Brive.

He is the older brother of former Stormers lock De Kock Steenkamp.
