= Jan Serfontein =

South African rugby union player

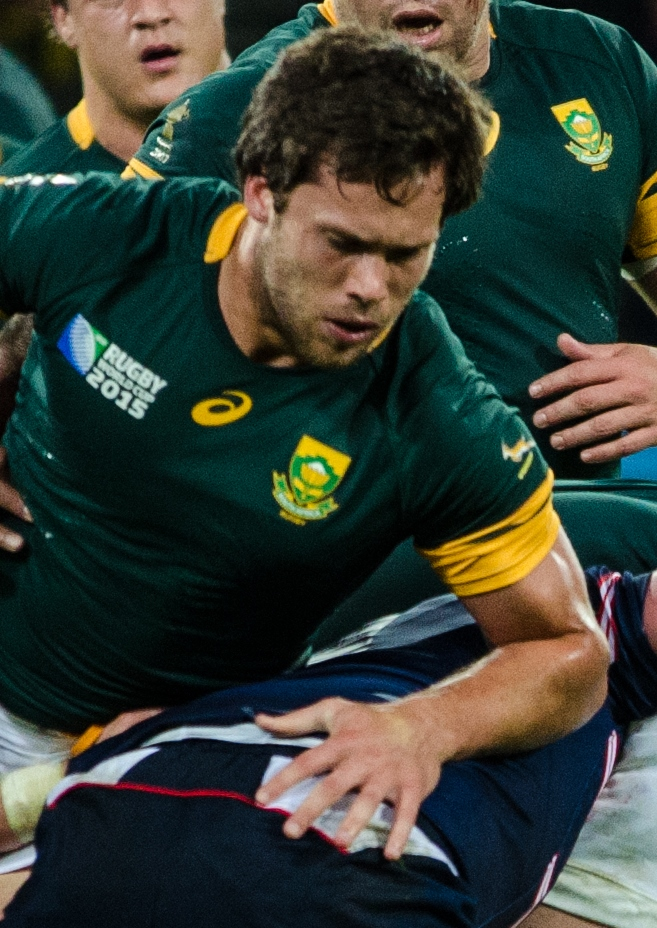
- Serfontein playing for the Springboks in the 2015 Rugby World Cup
- Full name: Jan Lodewyk Serfontein
- Born: 15 April 1993 (age 33) Port Elizabeth, South Africa
- Height: 1.88 m (6 ft 2 in)
- Weight: 97 kg (15 st 4 lb; 214 lb)
- School: Grey High School, Port Elizabeth / Grey College, Bloemfontein
- Notable relative(s): Boela Serfontein (brother); Boelie Serfontein (father); Jack Slater (great grandfather)

Rugby union career
- Position: Centre
Youth career
- 2006–2008: Eastern Province Kings
- 2009–2011: Free State Cheetahs
Senior career
Years	Team	Apps	(Points)
2012–2017	Blue Bulls	15	(20)
2013–2017	Bulls	60	(85)
2017–2025	Montpellier	137	(130)
2025–2026	Blue Bulls	0	(0)
2025–2026	Bulls	0	(0)
- Correct as of 10 July 2026
International career
Years	Team	Apps	(Points)
2012	South Africa U20	5	(20)
2013–2017	South Africa	35	(25)
- Correct as of 13 April 2018
Medal record
Men's Rugby union
Representing South Africa
Rugby World Cup
Bronze medal – third place	2015 England	Squad

Jan Lodewyk Serfontein (born 15 April 1993) is a South African former professional rugby union player. He played as a centre for the Blue Bulls in the Currie Cup and the Bulls in the United Rugby Championship. He previously played for Montpellier and made a major contribution to the club's first French Top 14 title in 2022.

== Career ==
Serfontein was a member of the South Africa under 20 team that won the 2012 IRB Junior World Championship. His performances in the tournament led to him being named 2012 IRB Junior Player of the Year. He was also included in the squad for the 2013 IRB Junior World Championship, but was later withdrawn to make him available for the senior national team.

Serfontein made his debut for the Springboks versus Italy on 8 June 2013 at Kings Park Stadium in Durban, playing from the bench as a replacement for Bryan Habana from the 71st minute.

In May 2026, Serfontein announced his retirement from professional rugby.

== Personal ==
Serfontein is the younger brother of lock Boela Serfontein. His father Boelie was also a provincial rugby player, playing as a number eight for Eastern Province, and his grandfather was Jack Slater, a former Springbok winger.

== Springbok statistics ==
=== Test match record ===
Against	Pld	W	D	L	Try	Con	Pen	DG	Pts	%Won
Argentina	2	2	0	0	0	0	0	0	0	100
Australia	4	3	0	1	0	0	0	0	0	75
England	1	1	0	0	1	0	0	0	5	100
Ireland	1	0	0	1	0	0	0	0	0	0
Italy	2	2	0	0	0	0	0	0	0	100
New Zealand	4	1	0	3	0	0	0	0	0	25
Samoa	1	1	0	0	0	0	0	0	0	100
Scotland	2	2	0	0	1	0	0	0	5	100
Wales	3	2	0	1	0	0	0	0	0	66.67
Total	20	14	0	6	2	0	0	0	10	70

Pld = Games Played, W = Games Won, D = Games Drawn, L = Games Lost, Try = Tries Scored, Con = Conversions, Pen = Penalties, DG = Drop Goals, Pts = Points Scored

=== International Tries ===
Try	Opponent	Location	Venue	Competition	Date	Result
1	Scotland	Nelspruit, South Africa	Mbombela Stadium	Mid-year rugby test series	15 June 2013	Won 30–17
2	England	London, England	Twickenham Stadium	End-of-year rugby test series	15 November 2014	Won 31–28
