= J. P. Koen =

JP Koen
- Full name: Juan-Pierre Koen
- Born: 17 October 1983 (age 43) Springs, South Africa
- Height: 1.83 m (6 ft 0 in)
- Weight: 115 kg (18 st 2 lb; 254 lb)
- School: Springs THS

Rugby union career
- Position: Prop / Hooker
- Current team: South Canterbury
Youth career
- 2002–2003: Falcons
Senior career
Years	Team	Apps	(Points)
2012–present	Southland	19	(0)
2014–present	Highlanders	3	(0)
- Correct as of 20 October 2014

Juan-Pierre 'JP' Koen (born 17 October 1983) is a South African rugby union player who currently plays as a prop for Southland in the ITM Cup and the Highlanders in the international Super Rugby competition.

== Career ==
Born and raised in South Africa, Koen played his youth rugby for the Falcons in his home province. However, a lack of domestic opportunities saw him move to New Zealand in 2004. He has played club rugby for the Invercargill based Pirates Old-Boys since arriving in New Zealand and eventually made the Southland ITM Cup side in 2012 where he made one appearance. He fully established himself as a starter during the 2013 ITM Cup campaign and an injury crisis in the Highlanders front-row towards the tail end of the 2014 Super Rugby season saw him earn a first Super Rugby cap in a 44-16 defeat by the Waratahs on 6 July 2014.
