= De Kock Steenkamp =

South African rugby union player

- Full name: Michiel de Kock Steenkamp
- Born: 16 February 1987 (age 39) Williston, South Africa
- Height: 1.97 m (6 ft 5 1/2 in)
- Weight: 112 kg (17 st 9 lb; 247 lb)
- School: Paarl Boys' High School
- University: Stellenbosch University
- Notable relative: Wilhelm Steenkamp (brother)

Rugby union career
- Position: Lock
- Current team: Ospreys
Youth career
- 2005–2008: Western Province
Amateur team(s)
Years	Team	Apps	(Points)
2008	Maties	6	(0)
Senior career
Years	Team	Apps	(Points)
2009–2014	Western Province	62	(5)
2010–2014	Stormers	49	(0)
2014–2015	Ospreys	2	(0)
- Correct as of 12 July 2014

Michiel de Kock Steenkamp (born 16 February 1987), is a South African professional rugby union player whose regular position is a lock. He played for Western Province in the Currie Cup and the Stormers in Super Rugby between 2009 and 2014.

== Early life ==
Steenkamp was born and raised in the Western Cape alongside older brother Wilhelm who went on to play for the Bulls, Sharks, Cheetahs and Force in Super Rugby. He attended Paarl Boys' High School and matriculated in 2005 before going on to study at Stellenbosch University. Whilst there he played Varsity Cup rugby for Maties during the inaugural competition in 2008 and was a late substitute as his side lifted the trophy with a 16–10 victory over UCT.

== Career ==
Steenkamp was a member of various Western Province age-level groups between 2005 and 2008 and made his senior debut against the Sharks during the 2009 Vodacom Cup. He got his first taste of Super Rugby the following year playing seven times for the Stormers but had to largely make do with deputising for absent Springboks such as Andries Bekker for the next 2 years.

2012 could be seen as a break-out year for Steenkamp. Although mainly featuring as a substitute during the Super Rugby season he provided strong cameos from the bench in place of either Bekker or Eben Etzebeth and also led the Stormers line out when either of their star men were injured. He then went on to feature in all of Western Province's games during the 2012 Currie Cup and he was a key man as they landed their first title since 2001 with a 25–19 win over the Sharks.

An injury to Eben Etzebeth which ruled him out of much of the 2013 Super Rugby season saw Steenkamp become firmly entrenched in the Stormers starting XV. He made 13 starts in a largely disappointing campaign for the men from the Cape and earned a reputation as one of the most consistent performers in South African rugby. This reputation was enhanced by his performances in the Currie Cup later in the year as he started every game for Western Province. It was a season in which they would again reach the tournament final, but this time they fell just short, losing 33–19 at home to the Sharks.

Steenkamp signed a contract extension in April 2013 to remain in Cape Town until 2015.

=== Ospreys ===
In September 2014, Welsh Pro12 side Ospreys announced that Steenkamp secured an early release from his contract and would join them for the 2014–15 Pro12 season. Steenkamp endured an injury-ravaged spell in Wales and after 14 months during which he played just two matches, he was released from his contract and returned to South Africa to complete his injury recovery.
