= Tim Buchanan (rugby union) =

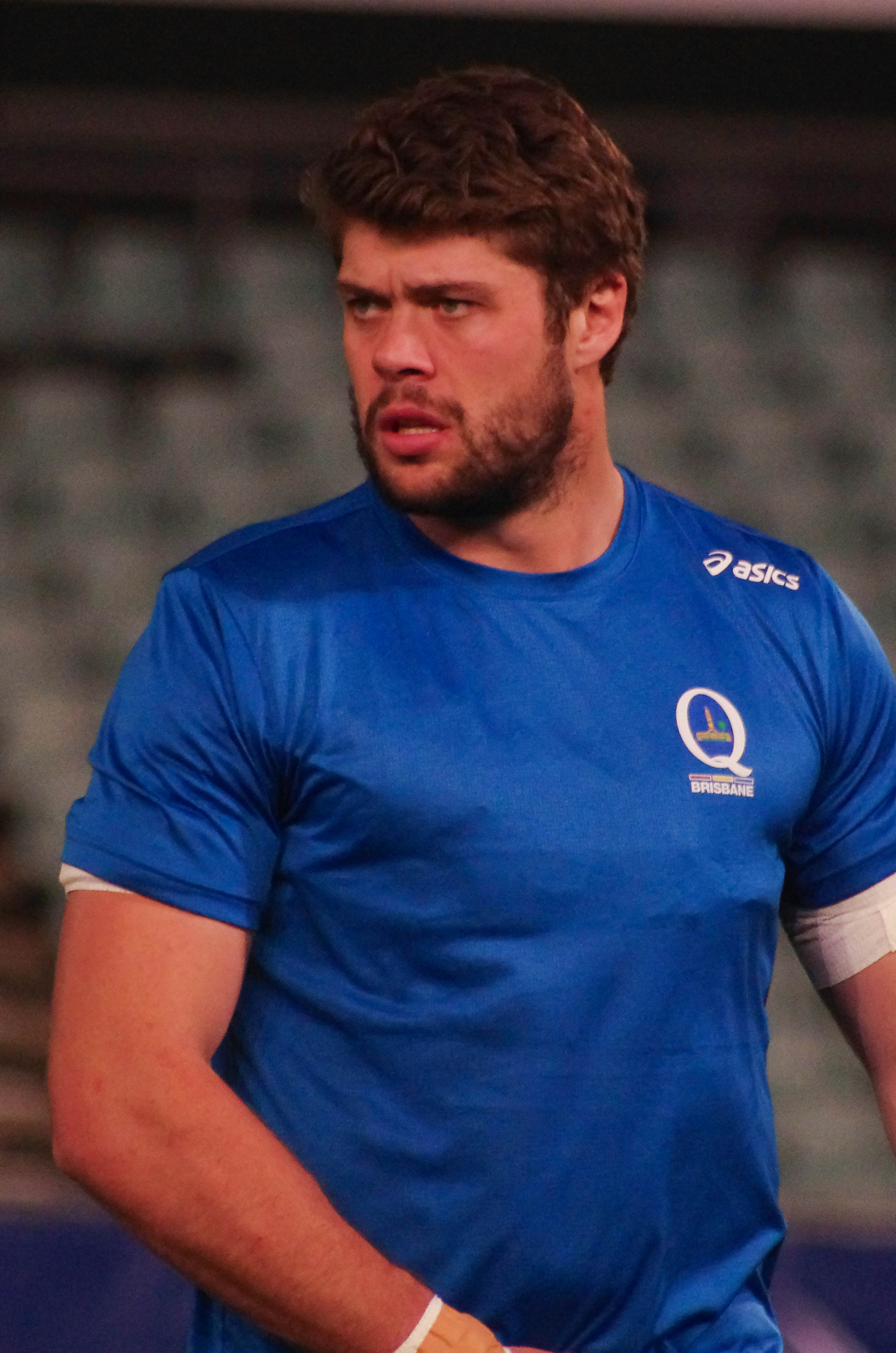
- Born: 20 April 1988 (age 38)
- Height: 193 cm (6 ft 4 in)
- Weight: 109 kg (240 lb)

Rugby union career
- Position: Lock
Super Rugby
Years	Team	Apps	(Points)
2014	Reds	1	(0)

Tim Buchanan (born 20 April 1988) is an Australian former rugby union player.

== Biography ==
Buchanan is a son of John Buchanan, former coach of the Australia national cricket team. His elder brother Michael and younger brother Nick also pursued cricket, playing professionally.

=== Rugby career ===
Primarily a lock, Buchanan was man of the match for the University of Queensland in their 2012 grand final win, of which he was also captain. He was part of the Queensland Reds training squad and in 2014 won a call up for their Super Rugby match against the Western Force in Perth, debuting off the bench for his solitary Reds cap.

Buchanan finished his career in Sydney rugby, captaining Easts.
