= Jack Slater (rugby union) =

South African rugby union player

- Full name: John Thornhill Slater
- Born: 16 April 1901 Grahamstown, South Africa
- Died: 16 February 1986 (aged 84)
- Height: 1.79 m (5 ft 10 in)
- Weight: 83 kg (183 lb)

Rugby union career
- Position: Wing three–quarter
Provincial / State sides
Years	Team	Apps	(Points)
- Eastern Province
International career
Years	Team	Apps	(Points)
1924–28	South Africa	3	(6)

John Thornhill Slater (16 April 1901 – 16 February 1986) was a South African international rugby union player.

== Biography ==
Born in Grahamstown, Slater was the son of Grahamstown Journal proprietor Josiah Slater and attended Kingswood College, where he played rugby alongside future Springboks captain Bennie Osler.

Slater was a strong and speedy three–quarter, who featured mostly on the wing, but could also play centre. He was an Eastern Province representative and obtained three Springboks caps during the 1920s. His first two appearances were on the right wing, for two home internationals against the 1924 British Lions. He returned to the side in 1928 against the All Blacks at Kingsmead and scored the only try of the match in a Springboks win.

A teacher by profession, Slater served as headmaster of Kingswood College between 1955 and 1964.

Slater is the great–grandfather of Springboks centre Jan Serfontein.

== See also ==
- List of South Africa national rugby union players
