= Nick Phipps (rugby union) =

Australian rugby union player (born 1989)

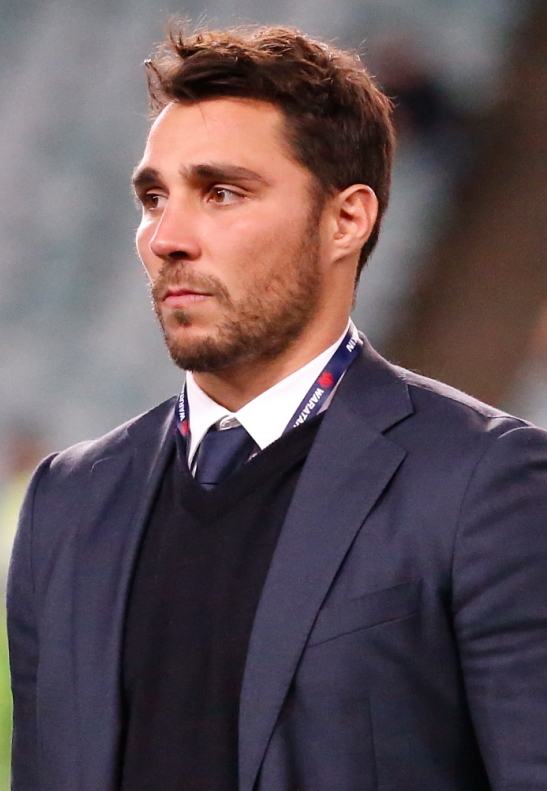
- Phipps in 2017
- Born: Nicholas James Phipps; 9 January 1989 (age 37) Baulkham Hills, New South Wales, Australia
- Height: 1.80 m (5 ft 11 in)
- Weight: 88 kg (13 st 12 lb; 194 lb)
- School: The King's School
- University: Sydney University
- Notable relatives: Jim Phipps (grandfather); Walter Phipps (great-uncle)

Rugby union career
- Position: Scrum-half
- Current team: Waratahs
Senior career
Years	Team	Apps	(Points)
2011–2013	Rebels	47	(30)
2014–2019	Waratahs	87	(90)
2017	Greater Sydney Rams	1	(5)
2018	Sydney Rays	1	(0)
2019–2022	London Irish	64	(47)
2022–2026	NEC Green Rockets	36	(61)
2027–	Waratahs	0	(0)
- Correct as of 6 August 2026
International career
Years	Team	Apps	(Points)
2011–2019	Australia	72	(40)
National sevens team
Years	Team		Comps
2009–2010	Australia Sevens		
Medal record
Men's rugby union
Representing Australia
Rugby World Cup
Silver medal – second place	2015 England	Squad
Bronze medal – third place	2011 New Zealand	Squad
Men's rugby sevens
Commonwealth Games
Silver medal – second place	2010 Delhi	Team competition

Nicholas James Phipps (born 9 January 1989) is an Australian rugby union player who plays as a scrum-half for the Waratahs in the Super Rugby. Between 2011 and 2019, Phipps played for the Australia national team, making 72 Test caps and playing a backup role in their 2015 Rugby World Cup in which they finished runners-up.

== Early life ==
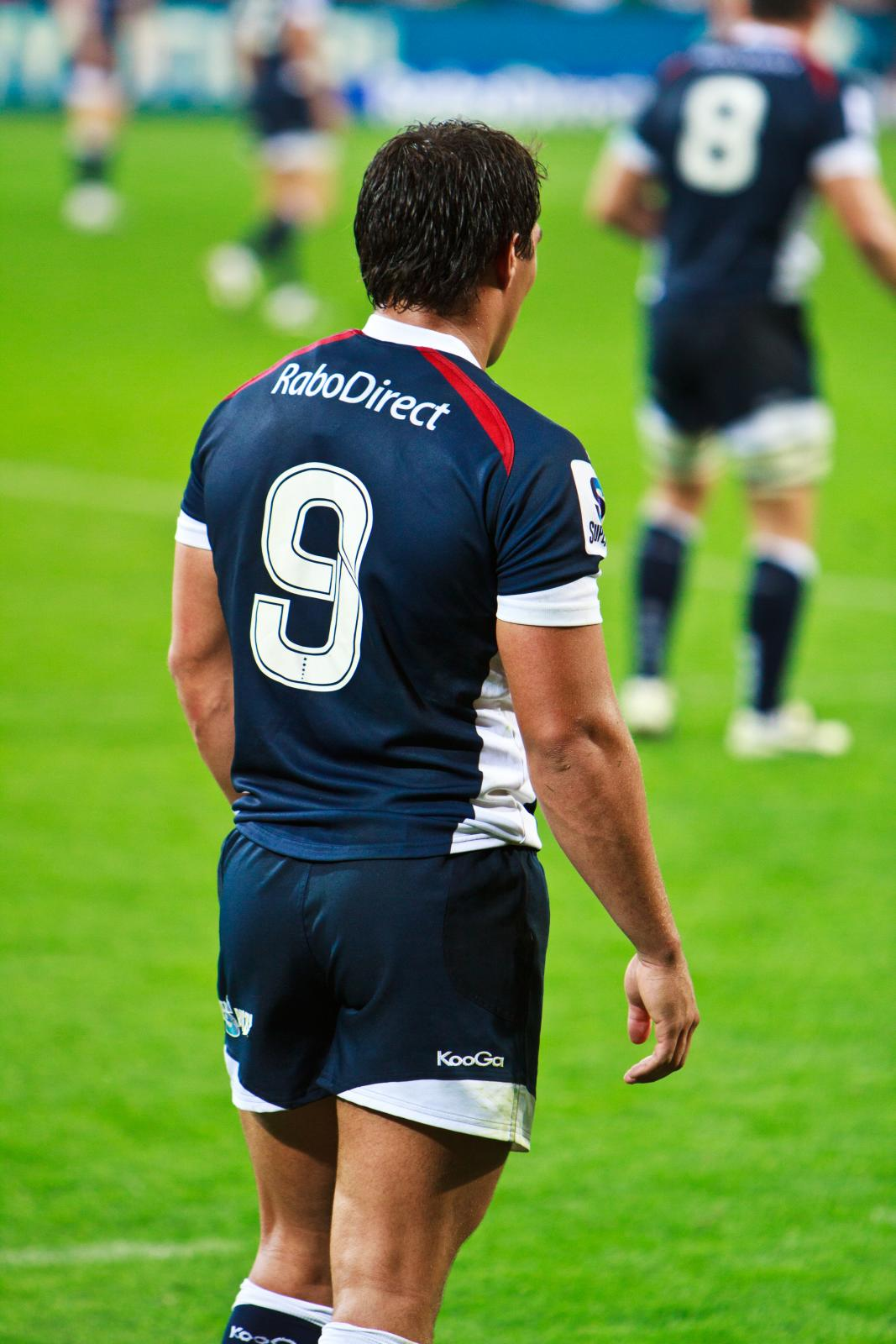
Phipps playing for the Rebels in 2011.

Phipps was educated at The King's School and in 2009 captained Sydney University's premiership-winning 1st Colts team. As of 2017, he was studying a Masters of International Business at Sydney University.

== Career ==
=== Rebels ===
Phipps signed to the Melbourne Rebels in July 2010. Phipps mentors for the 2011 Super Rugby season included former Wallaby halfback Sam Cordingley. Phipps said he was looking forward to learning from his fellow halfbacks, Cordingley, and Kingi, and also from Rebels centre (and former Wallaby) Julian Huxley.

In May 2012 Phipps combined with Kurtley Beale in the halves (9 & 10) against the Bulls from South Africa. Beale had been moved from fullback to flyhalf following Danny Cipriani's unexpected departure from the Rebels. Phipps scored a try under the posts.

=== Waratahs ===
Phipps moved back to Sydney to play for the Waratahs commencing 2014.

Rebels coach Damien Hill said, "Nick has played a major part in laying the foundations of this Club and it is disappointing to see him leave. He replicates our team ethos in everything he does, both on a off the rugby field."

The Wallabies and Waratahs scrum half re-signed with the ARU and NSW Waratahs in January 2017 for a two-year contract extension that takes Phipps through to the end of the 2019 season. In March 2017 he brought up his 100th super rugby cap.

=== London Irish ===
On 1 February 2019, Phipps travel to England to join London Irish in the English Premiership ahead of the 2019–20 season.

=== Return to the Waratahs: 2027 ===
In May 2026, after finishing his time in Japan, Phipps said that he was returning to Australia to assess his options. By July, reports emerged that both Phipps and former Waratahs teammate Bernard Foley were in contract negotiations with the Waratahs to return for their 2027 season. On 6 August 2026, the Waratahs confirmed both Phipps and Foley's signing for ahead of the 2027 season.

== International career ==
His grandfather and great uncle, both called Jim, played for the Wallabies. Following the rich family culture within rugby Phipps made his international debut playing for Australia in the 2009 IRB Sevens World Series.

Phipps played in the Australian Sevens at the 2010 Commonwealth Games, in Delhi. He scored a try and kicked eight conversions in his Games' debut. Australia went on to win Silver, losing the final to New Zealand.

In late 2010 Phipps toured with the Wallabies, and was named on the bench against the Leicester Tigers. In August 2011 Phipps became one of three halfbacks selected for the Wallabies in the 2011 Rugby World Cup. Phipps played 26 minutes for the Wallabies against Russia. He was one of three Rebels to play in the tournament, the others being new signings James O'Connor and Kurtley Beale. He has continued his international career playing and appearing in the bench frequently since his debut in the green and gold.

After almost two years since Phipps started for the Wallabies on home soil, he was chosen for his 29th start in a Wallabies jersey in the third deciding test against Ireland.

== Personal life ==
Phipps is the grandson of Jim Phipps, and great-nephew of Walter Phipps, both former Wallabies.

Phipps married Ebony in 2018 and welcomed a son in early 2019.

== Awards and honours ==
Waratahs

- Super Rugby: 2014

Australia

- The Rugby Championship: 2015
- Rugby World Cup runner-up: 2015

Australia Sevens

- Commonwealth Games – Silver medal: 2010

Individual

- Sydney University Male Blue of the Year: 2017
- Celebrity Men's Health Man of the Year: 2016
