= James King (rugby union, born 1987) =

US international rugby union player

James King "The King"
- Born: 16 March 1987 (age 39) Pukekohe, New Zealand
- Height: 2.00 m (6 ft 6 1/2 in)
- Weight: 122 kg (19 st 3 lb)
- Notable relative: Tony Lamborn (cousin)

Rugby union career
- Position: Lock
Provincial / State sides
Years	Team	Apps	(Points)
2009–2011	North Harbour	27	(15)
Super Rugby
Years	Team	Apps	(Points)
2011	Blues	4	(0)
2012–13	Rebels	1	(0)
- Correct as of 16 April 2012
International career
Years	Team	Apps	(Points)
2016–	United States	2	(0)
- Correct as of 26 June 2015

James King (born 16 March 1987) is a rugby union player. His regular playing position is lock.

King was born in Pukekohe, New Zealand. He previously represented the Rebels and the Blues in Super Rugby. In 2014 King left the Rebels for a contract in Japan, playing for the Yakult Levins.

The King debuted for the United States national rugby union team at the 2016 Americas Rugby Championship. He qualified through his American mother.
