= Richard Kingi =

NZ rugby union player

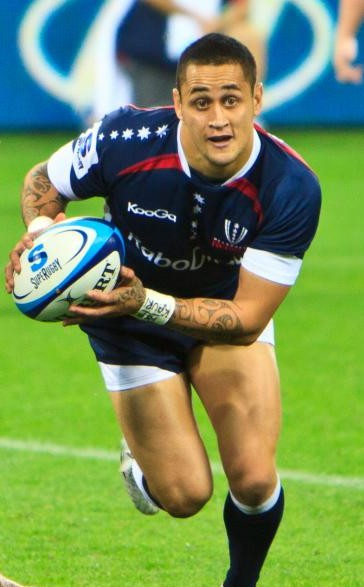
- Kingi during a match for the Rebels, March 2011
- Born: 17 March 1989 (age 37) Tauranga, New Zealand
- Height: 177 cm (5 ft 10 in)
- Weight: 92 kg (203 lb; 14 st 7 lb)
- School: Keebra Park State High School

Rugby union career
- Position(s): Half-back, Wing, Fullback
- Current team: Griffith University Knights
Senior career
| Years | Team | Apps | (Points) |
| 2009–2010 | Reds | 5 | (0) |
| 2011–2013 | Rebels | 31 | (23) |
| 2013–2014 | Stade Français | 14 | (25) |
| 2017–2018 | Enisei-STM | 3 | (0) |
- Correct as of 1 June 2020
International career
| Years | Team | Apps | (Points) |
| 2008–2009 | Australia U20 | 9 | (49) |
- Correct as of 1 June 2020
Coaching career
- Years: Team
- 2019–: Griffith University Knights (assistant)
- Correct as of 1 June 2020

Richard Kingi (born 17 March 1989 in Tauranga, New Zealand) is an Australian professional Rugby union footballer. While his usual position is half back, he often plays on the wing and sometimes at fullback.

== Career ==
Brought up in Te Puke near the Bay of Plenty, Kingi's family moved to Australia when he was 15 years old.

He played for Sunnybank rugby club, before going onto representative football that included the Queensland U19s, U20s, the IRB Junior World Championships and the Australian Sevens. He travelled with the Wallabies spring tour of Japan and Great Britain in 2009, and made his Wallabies debut against the Cardiff Blues.

In 2009–10 Kingi was reserve halfback for the Queensland Reds, behind Will Genia. He signed a two-year deal with the Melbourne Rebels in March 2010, and in 2011 his competitors for the Rebels halfback role were Nick Phipps, and former Wallaby Sam Cordingley.

In October 2010, Kingi was named as one of 12 uncapped players in the Wallabies' 40-man squad to train for its tour of Hong Kong and Europe. When he wasn't required for Wallabies training he travelled to Lorne to be part of the Rebels' pre-season team-building activities.

== Griffith university colleges knights ==
As of the 2019 season Kingi has signed on as Backs coach and Fly Half for the Knights in the Gold Coast District Rugby Union competition. As of 18 May he has led them to 6 wins from 6 appearances. He has also been instrumental in the Knights Women's 7's program acting as Coach and Mentor for the girls in his role as director of women's rugby.

== Personal life and relatives ==
Kingi has several children. His cousin Tanerau Latimer is a Chiefs flanker, New Zealand Maori representative and former All Black.
