= Tim Davidson =

Australian rugby union player

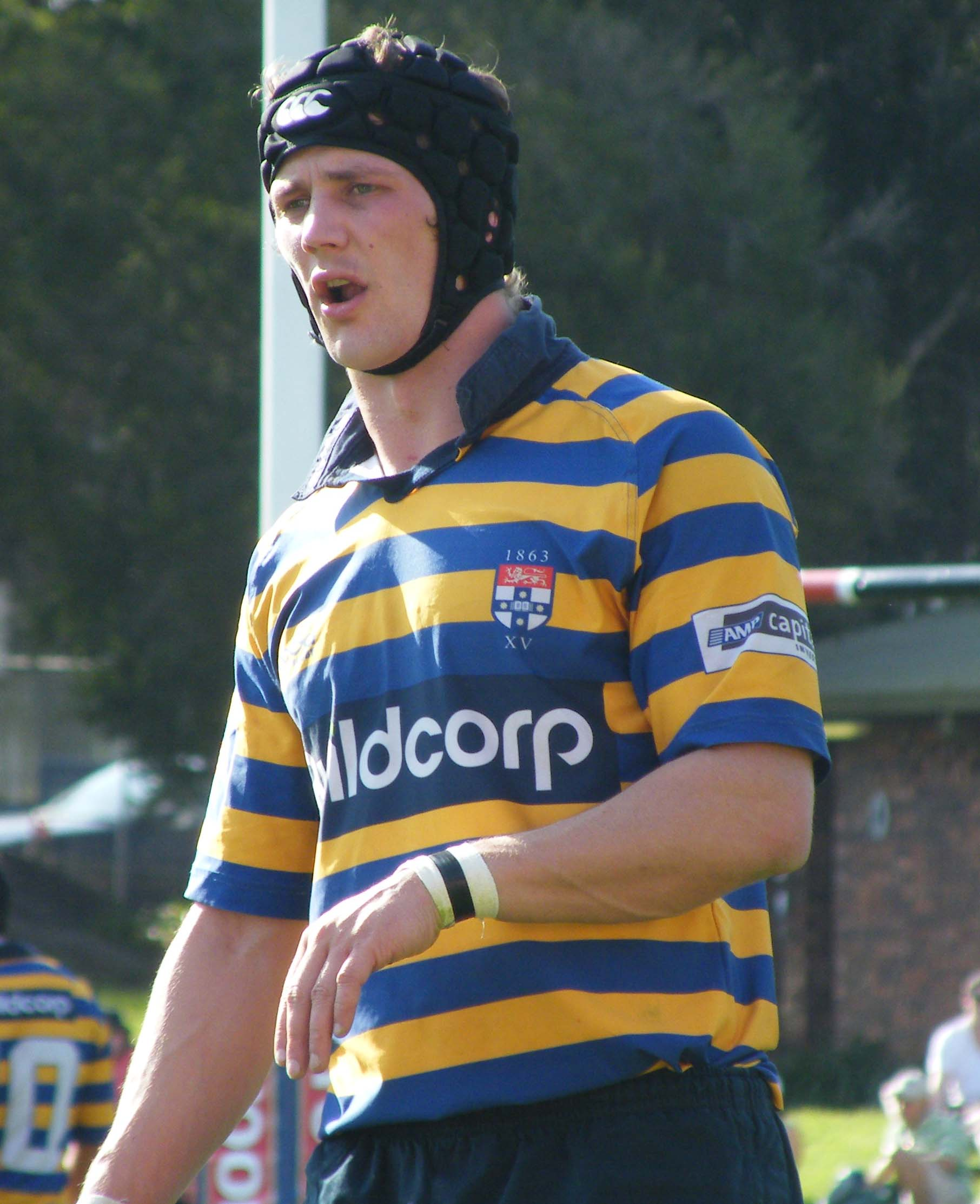
- Born: Tim Davidson; 3 November 1982 (age 44) Young, Australia
- Height: 1.94 m (6 ft 4 1/2 in)
- Weight: 105 kg (16 st 7 lb)

Rugby union career
- Position: Flanker, eighthman
Senior career
Years	Team	Apps	(Points)
2007	Sydney Fleet	7	(5)
Super Rugby
Years	Team	Apps	(Points)
2006	Force	5	(0)
2007	Waratahs	8	(0)
2011–13	Rebels	26	(5)
- Correct as of 7 June 2013

Tim Davidson (born 3 November 1982, in Young, Australia) is a rugby union footballer. His regular playing position is either flanker or eighthman. He represented the Melbourne Rebels in Super Rugby having previously played for the Western Force and Waratahs. Davidson's association within the Shute Shield and at Sydney University Football Club (SUFC) stems back to his first season of playing in 1st Colts in 2002. In 2005, Davidson became SUFC 1st Grade captain, a position he held up until his last season playing rugby in 2013. During this time he captained SUFC to eight Shute Shield titles, including six in concession, and is the most capped SUFC 1st Grade forward in the club's history.

Beyond SUFC, Davidson held a Super Rugby career across three franchises, being the Melbourne Rebels’ inaugural off-field club captain in 2013.

Despite his retirement from rugby at the end of the 2013 season, Davidson has continued his involvement including SUFC 1st Grade forwards coach for 2015, a member of the club's networking and mentoring group made up of past SUFC players, and a member of the 2015 SUFC executive committee. Outside of rugby, he works for NAB in corporate agribusiness.
