= Nic Henderson =

Australia international rugby union player

- Born: Nic Henderson; 1 May 1981 (age 45) Millmerran, Australia
- Height: 1.80 m (5 ft 11 in)
- Weight: 117 kg (258 lb)
- School: Kooringal High School, NSW
- Notable relative: Guy Shepherdson
- Occupation: Professional rugby union footballer

Rugby union career
- Position: Loosehead prop
- Current team: Rebels
Super Rugby
Years	Team	Apps	(Points)
2004–09	Brumbies	68	(5)
2010	Force	8	(0)
2011–13	Rebels	41	(0)
- Correct as of 15 July 2013
International career
Years	Team	Apps	(Points)
2004–06	Australia	3	(0)

Nic Henderson (born 1 May 1981), is an Australian rugby union player. He played with the Brumbies before joining the Melbourne Rebels for the 2011 and 2012 Super Rugby seasons. He also has three test caps.

Henderson retired after the 2013 Super Rugby season. Henderson holds a Super Rugby record for playing the most games without scoring a try (119 games).

Henderson previously played rugby league, joining the Melbourne Storm ahead of the 2001 NRL season, playing for feeder club Norths Devils in the Queensland Cup.
