= Malaysia Valke =

- Union: Malaysia Rugby; Falcons Rugby Union
- Founded: 2019
- Disbanded: 2020
- League: Global Rapid Rugby

The Malaysia Valke was a professional rugby union team based in Kuala Lumpur that played in the Global Rapid Rugby competition. The team was formed in 2019 as a joint venture between Malaysia Rugby and the Falcons Rugby Union of South Africa, but was disbanded a year later after the incomplete 2020 season was cancelled due to the COVID-19 pandemic.

The team was scheduled to play three matches in 2020 at the Bukit Jalil National Stadium in Kuala Lumpur and two matches at Stadium TUDM on the Subang base of the Royal Malaysian Air Force (RMAF or in Malay, TUDM: Tentera Udara Diraja Malaysia). However, after season was suspended due to the coronavirus pandemic, the team's home games were not able to be played.

The Malaysia Valke ultimately played only two matches before being disbanded. These were away games to the Western Force in Perth in 2019 and 2020.

== Personnel ==
The Malaysia Valke team was predominantly made up of South African players and staff but also included members of the Malaysia national team and players from other nations.

=== Head coaches ===
- JP Immelman (2019)
- Rudy Joubert (2020)
- Team Manager: Ben Ibrahim (2019 & 2020)

=== Captains ===
- Shane Kirkwood (2019)
- Andries Truter (2020)

=== Squads ===
2020 Global Rapid Rugby (Note: The initial 32-man squad was named in March 2020.)

Hooker
- (South Africa) Robey Leibrandt
- (South Africa) Tian van der Merwe
Prop
- (South Africa) Qhama Hina
- (South Africa) Lux Koza
- (Zimbabwe) Primo Ncube
- (South Africa) Heinrich Roelfse
Lock
- (South Africa) Jacques Alberts
- (South Africa) Andrew Volschenk
Backrow
- (South Africa) Cody Basson
- (South Africa) Thabo Mabuza
- (South Africa) Vince Maruping
- (South Africa) Friedle Olivier
- (South Africa) Dwayne Pienaar
- (South Africa) Conway Pretorius
- (Malaysia) **Samuel Rentap Meran**
- (South Africa) Boela Venter
Scrum half
- (South Africa) Zee Empangeni
- (South Africa) Johan Pretotius
- (South Africa) Anrich Richter
Fly half
- (Malaysia) **Amirul Aqil**
- (South Africa) Divan Nel
Centre
- (South Africa) Andries Truter (c)
- (South Africa) Andrew van Wyk
- (South Africa) Valentino Wellman
Wing
- (South Africa) Ezrick Alexander
- (South Africa) Coert Cronje
- (South Africa) Roro Damons
- (Malaysia) **Anwarul Hafiz Ahmad**
- (Malaysia) **Marc Lee**
- (Malaysia) **Badrul Muktee**
- (South Africa) Hardus Pretorius
Fullback
- (South Africa) Errol Jaggers

Notes:

Bold denotes player is internationally capped. (c) Denotes team captain. ^{1} denotes marquee player.

== See also ==
- Rugby union in Malaysia
