= Rugby union in Malaysia =

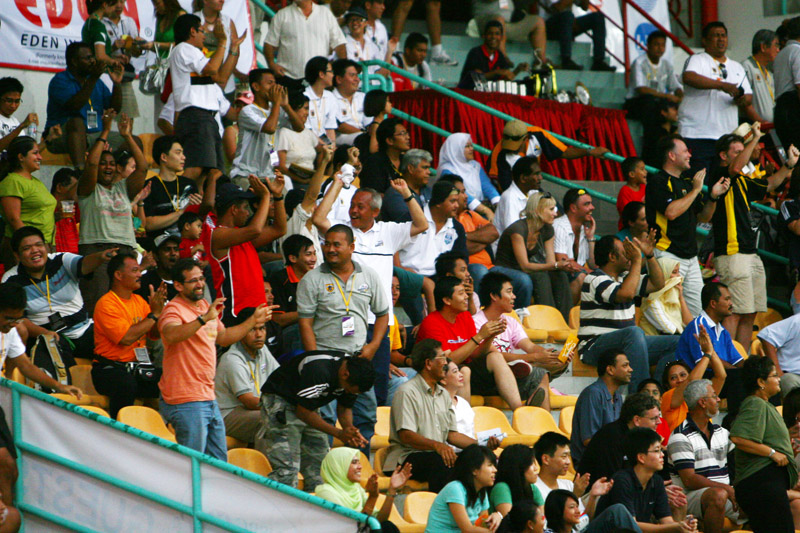
- Crowd at the COBRA Rugby Tens
- Country: Malaysia
- Governing body: Malaysian Rugby Union
- National team: Malaysia
- First played: Late 19th century
- Registered players: 41,050
- Clubs: 300+

National competitions
- Rugby World Cup; Rugby World Cup Sevens; IRB Sevens World Series; Asian Five Nations

Club competitions
- Malay Cup; MRU Super Cup; MRU Super League

Rugby union in Malaysia is a sport with a long history, and a significant participation. There are 41,050 registered players, and the country is currently ranked 47th. There are sixteen unions, associations and councils affiliated to the Malaysian Rugby Union, more than 300 clubs, and 600 schools which teach the game. Malaysian rugby's most notable contribution to the game at large is the invention of rugby tens.

== Governing body ==
The governing body is the Malaysian Rugby Union (Malaysian: Kesatuan Ragbi Malaysia). The Malaya Rugby Union (as it was then) was founded in 1921 and joined the IRFB in 1988. The founder members were Selangor, Ipoh District, Singapore, Malacca and Negeri Sembilan.

It is a founding member of the Asian Rugby Football Union.

== History ==
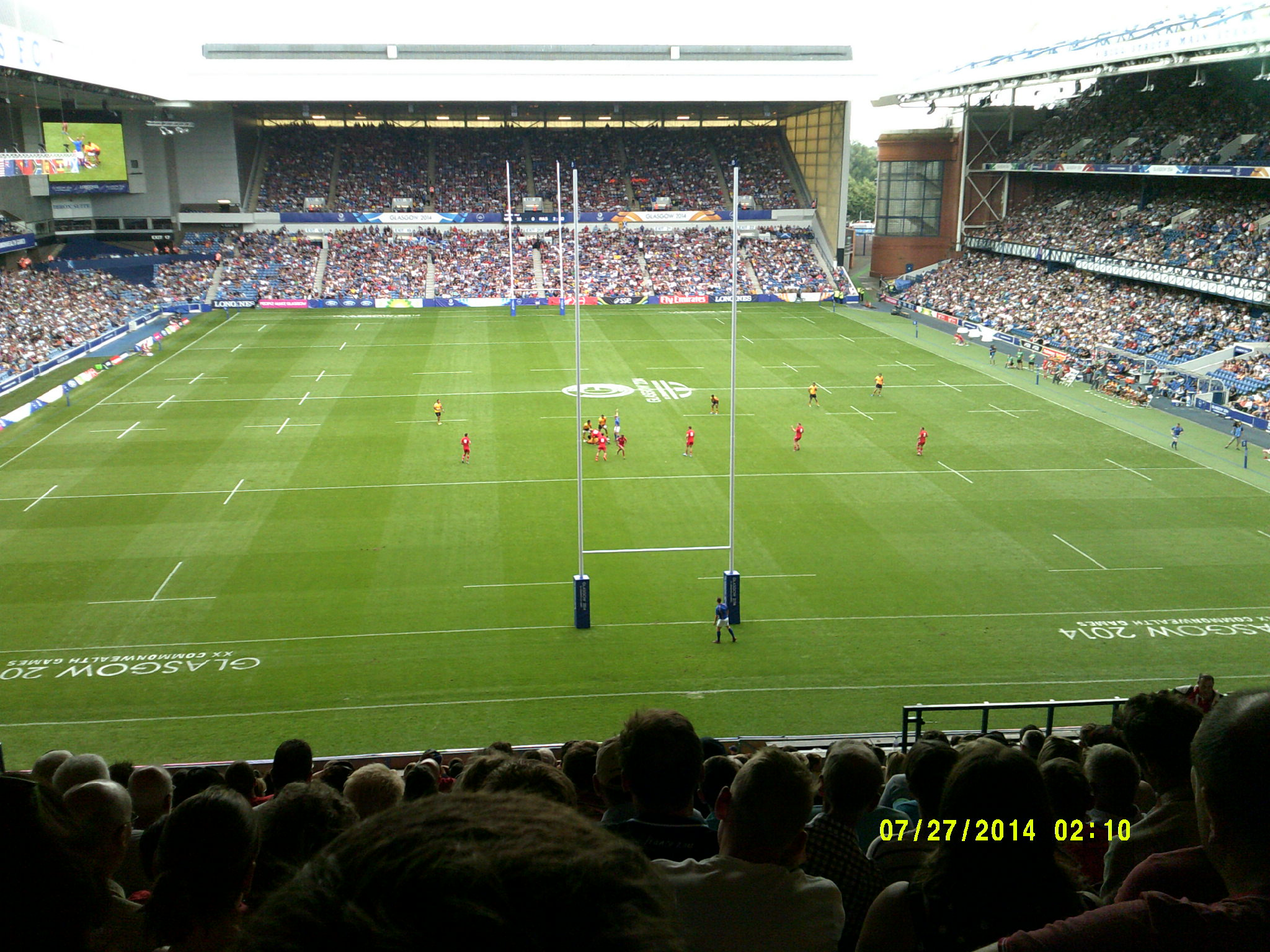
Wales playing Malaysia at the 2014 Commonwealth Games in Glasgow

Rugby was introduced to the British colony of Malaya in the late nineteenth century. It has had a steady presence since the beginning of the 20th century, when the Malay Cup between Singapore national rugby union team and Malaya was established, which is one of the oldest rugby competitions in the world.

There is also the Agong's Cup (Piala Agong, or "King's Cup") which is played between the 13 states in Malaysia, the 3 Federal Territories, Royal Malay Regiment (Army) and Royal Malaysian Police (PDRM).

The first inter-club match was played in 1902 between Singapore Cricket Club and Royal Selangor Club. Royal Selangor Club has also hosted one of the oldest rugby sevens tournaments in Asia, the Jonah Jones Rugby Sevens Tournament.

The Malaysians have been instrumental in setting up a number of other South Asian competitions, which have helped bolster the game in the region, among these were an Asian "round robin" tournament between Malaysia, Singapore, Sri Lanka, and Indonesia. However, while the game is popular at school level, economic factors prevent many people playing after they leave.

Among the other Malaysian innovations has been the game of "tens" - yet another smaller variant on the usually fifteen a side game.

Malaysia also has a national sevens team.

=== HMS Malaya Cup ===
The major trophy is the "HMS Malaya Cup" which was first presented in 1921 and still is awarded to the winners of the Malay sevens. The original trophy was presented by the officers and men of a British battleship, HMS Malaya. In honour of this, the competition was renamed the HMS Malaya Cup in 1933. An association football cup of the same name began at the same time, but has since changed its name to the Malaysia Cup. The original trophy was lost in 1942 before being found in a jungle in 1961.

=== 1998 Commonwealth Games - Kuala Lumpur, Malaysia ===
Event	Gold	Silver	Bronze
Men's Rugby Sevens	New Zealand	Fiji	Australia

Malaysia is an active participant in the Commonwealth Sevens, and the 1998 Commonwealth Games, held in Kuala Lumpur was the first Commonwealth Games to feature the sport.

In front of 20,000 fans at the Petaling Jaya Stadium, Rugby sevens was an enormous success with New Zealand collecting its 100th Commonwealth Games medal with a 21–12 win over the plucky Fiji (the reigning world champions). Man of the match was the giant Jonah Lomu who had worked tirelessly during the 10-minutes each way final. Led by veteran star David Campese, Australia took the bronze beating Samoa 33–12.

== Domestic competitions ==
=== MRU Super League ===
This competition that was established in 2004, is the first tier of rugby club competition in Malaysia. It consists of 12 top Malaysian clubs, divided into two groups. The top 4 of each group were advanced to the knockout stage, while the club that being placed at bottom, were relegated to National Inter-Club Championship next year.

== See also ==
- Malaysia national rugby union team
- Malaysia national rugby sevens team
- Robert Miln Neill, who died in Kuala Lumpur in 1914.
- Thomas Hart (cricketer), rugby player and cricketer for Malaya.
