= 2017 Malaysia Rugby League Premier =

- Date: 4 February 2017 – 1 April 2016
- Matches played: 39

The Malaysia Rugby League Premier 2017 was the 17th season of Malaysia Rugby League Premier, Malaysia's domestic rugby union competition. The kick off will begin on 4 February 2017. This season embarks the newly, organized league structure, with more involvement of clubs from entire Malaysia to develop the excitement of the rugby scene in Malaysia.

== Teams ==
A total of 12 teams will compete in the 2017 season.

- (Kuala Lumpur) Cobra RC
- (Negeri Sembilan) NS Wanderers RC
- (Selangor) UPM Angels
- (Malaysia) UiTM Lions
- (Putrajaya) ASAS RC
- (Kuala Lumpur) DBKL
- (Pahang) Panthers Blowpipes
- (Kuala Lumpur) Keris Conlay RC
- (Johor) Iskandar Raiders
- (Johor) SSTMI Tsunami
- (Johor) Mersing Eagles
- (Malacca) Politeknik Merlimau

== Season ==
In preliminary stage, all 12 teams were divided into 2 groups, and a single round-robin tournament was held by both groups.

=== Standings ===
• Teams 1 to 4 (Green background) at the end of the preliminary competition rounds qualify for the final stage.
• The lowest-placed teams (Red background) were relegated.

Group A
Pos	Team	Played	Won	Drawn	Lost	Points For	Points Against	Points Difference	Try Bonus	Losing Bonus	Points
1	Mersing Eagles	5	4	1	0	159	77	+82	4	0	23
2	Iskandar Raiders	5	4	0	1	115	120	-5	3	0	20
3	UPM Angels	5	2	0	3	101	108	-7	1	3	15
4	NS Wanderers	5	1	1	3	96	98	-2	1	3	14
5	Politeknik Merlimau	5	2	0	3	98	117	-19	0	1	12
6	COBRA	5	1	0	4	74	124	-50	0	3	11
Group B
Pos	Team	Played	Won	Drawn	Lost	Points For	Points Against	Points Difference	Try Bonus	Losing Bonus	Points
1	Keris Conlay	5	5	0	0	208	53	+155	5	0	25
2	ASAS RC	5	4	0	1	160	85	+78	4	0	21
3	UiTM Lions	5	3	0	2	172	115	+57	1	1	16
4	SSTMI	5	2	0	3	153	128	+25	2	1	14
5	DBKL	5	1	0	4	152	140	+12	1	1	10
6	Panthers Blowpipes	5	0	0	5	42	369	-327	0	0	5
Four points for a win, three for a draw, one for a loss, and no points for a bye. One bonus point for the winning team scoring four or more tries (BP1), one bonus point for losing by four or less by their opponent (BP2). If teams are level on points in the standings at any stage, tiebreakers are applied in the following order: • Difference between points for and against • Total number of points for • Number of matches won • Aggregate number of points scored in matches between tied teams

=== Grouping stage matches ===
Week 1

4 February 2016	NS Wanderers (Negeri Sembilan)	41 - 31	(Malacca) Politeknik Merlimau	UPM, Serdang
14:30 (UTC+08:00)

4 February 2016	UPM Angels (Selangor)	30 - 34	(Johor) Iskandar Raiders	UPM, Serdang
16:30 (UTC+08:00)

4 February 2016	COBRA (Kuala Lumpur)	5 - 52	(Johor) Mersing Eagles	Padang Bellamy, Kuala Lumpur
14:30 (UTC+08:00)

4 February 2016	ASAS RC (Putrajaya)	32 - 19	(Malaysia) UiTM Lions	Padang Bellamy, Kuala Lumpur
16:30 (UTC+08:00)

5 February 2016	SSTMI (Johor)	28 - 26	(Kuala Lumpur) DBKL	UPM, Serdang
14:30 (UTC+08:00)

5 February 2016	Keris Conlay (Kuala Lumpur)	86 - 0	(Pahang) Panthers Blowpipes	UPM, Serdang
16:30 (UTC+08:00)

Week 2

11 February 2016	NS Wanderers (Negeri Sembilan)	20 - 21	(Selangor) UPM Angels	UPM, Serdang
14:30 (UTC+08:00)

11 February 2016	Politeknik Merlimau (Malacca)	25 - 37	(Johor) Mersing Eagles	UPM, Serdang
16:30 (UTC+08:00)

11 February 2016	SSTMI (Johor)	0 - 37	(Kuala Lumpur) Keris Conlay	Padang Bellamy, Kuala Lumpur
14:30 (UTC+08:00)

11 February 2016	COBRA (Kuala Lumpur)	22 - 26	(Johor) Iskandar Raiders	Padang Bellamy, Kuala Lumpur
16:30 (UTC+08:00)

12 February 2016	DBKL (Kuala Lumpur)	25 - 40	(Malaysia) UiTM Lions	UPM, Serdang
14:30 (UTC+08:00)

12 February 2016	ASAS RC (Putrajaya)	72 - 12	(Pahang) Panthers Blowpipes	UPM, Serdang
16:30 (UTC+08:00)

Week 3

18 February 2016	NS Wanderers (Negeri Sembilan)	10 - 17	(Kuala Lumpur) COBRA	UPM, Serdang
14:30 (UTC+08:00)

18 February 2016	Politeknik Merlimau (Malacca)	19 - 17	(Selangor) UPM Angels	UPM, Serdang
16:30 (UTC+08:00)

18 February 2016	Mersing Eagles (Johor)	35 - 14	(Johor) Iskandar Raiders	Padang Bellamy, Kuala Lumpur
14:30 (UTC+08:00)

18 February 2016	SSTMI (Johor)	26 - 32	(Putrajaya) ASAS RC	Padang Bellamy, Kuala Lumpur
16:30 (UTC+08:00)

19 February 2016	UiTM Lions (Malaysia)	67 - 17	(Pahang) Panthers Blowpipes	UPM, Serdang
14:30 (UTC+08:00)

19 February 2016	DBKL (Kuala Lumpur)	30 - 42	(Kuala Lumpur) Keris Conlay	UPM, Serdang
16:30 (UTC+08:00)

Week 4

25 February 2016	COBRA (Kuala Lumpur)	20 - 21	(Selangor) UPM Angels	UPM, Serdang
14:30 (UTC+08:00)

25 February 2016	NS Wanderers (Negeri Sembilan)	0 - 0	(Johor) Mersing Eagles	UPM, Serdang
16:30 (UTC+08:00)		abandoned

25 February 2016	DBKL (Kuala Lumpur)	64 - 8	(Pahang) Panthers Blowpipes	Padang Bellamy, Kuala Lumpur
14:30 (UTC+08:00)

25 February 2016	Politeknik Merlimau (Malacca)	8 - 12	(Johor) Iskandar Raiders	Padang Bellamy, Kuala Lumpur
16:30 (UTC+08:00)

26 February 2016	ASAS RC (Putrajaya)	5 - 21	(Kuala Lumpur) Keris Conlay	UPM, Serdang
14:30 (UTC+08:00)

26 February 2016	SSTMI (Johor)	19 - 28	(Malaysia) UiTM Lions	UPM, Serdang
16:30 (UTC+08:00)

Week 5

4 March 2016	NS Wanderers (Negeri Sembilan)	25 - 29	(Johor) Iskandar Raiders	UPM, Serdang
14:30 (UTC+08:00)

4 March 2016	UPM Angels (Selangor)	33 - 35	(Johor) Mersing Eagles	UPM, Serdang
16:30 (UTC+08:00)

4 March 2016	SSTMI (Johor)	80 - 5	(Pahang) Panthers Blowpipes	Padang Bellamy, Kuala Lumpur
14:30 (UTC+08:00)

4 March 2016	Keris Conlay (Kuala Lumpur)	22 - 18	(Malaysia) UiTM Lions	Padang Bellamy, Kuala Lumpur
16:30 (UTC+08:00)

5 March 2016	Politeknik Merlimau (Malacca)	15 - 10	(Kuala Lumpur) COBRA	UPM, Serdang
14:30 (UTC+08:00)

5 March 2016	DBKL (Kuala Lumpur)	7 - 19	(Putrajaya) ASAS RC	UPM, Serdang
16:30 (UTC+08:00)

=== Final round ===
In the final round, ASAS RC played against Keris Conlay and Keris Conlay won with 24 points, the ASAS RC having 17.

== See also ==
- Malaysia Rugby League Premier
