= 2017 Malaysia Rugby League Division 2 =

- Date: 4 February 2017 – 12 March 2017
- Matches played: 15

The Malaysia Rugby League Division 1 2017 was the inaugural season of Malaysia Rugby League Division 2, Malaysia's domestic rugby union competition. The kick off will begin on 4 February 2017. Previously known as National Inter Club Championship (NICC), this season embarks the newly, organized league structure for more clubs to participate.

== Teams ==
A total of 10 teams will compete in the 2017 season.

- (Negeri Sembilan) Home of Warriors RC
- Terengganu RT
- (Kuala Lumpur) VIOBA Blues
- (Penang) USM Jokers
- (Perak) UTP Drillers
- RMP Pahang
- (Kuala Lumpur) Kelleys
- (Putrajaya) Qubyx Lions
- (Pahang) Jerantut Rainforest RC
- Navy ORCA

== Season ==
In preliminary stage, all 10 teams were divided into two groups of three teams, and two groups of two teams, and a single round-robin tournament was held by all groups.

=== Standings ===
==== Group A ====
Team	Played	Won	Drawn	Lost	Points for	Points against	Points difference	Bonus point	Points
**VIOBA**	1	1	0	0	8	7	+1	0	4
**Homes of Warriors RC**	1	0	0	1	7	8	-1	1	2

Homes of Warriors RC (Negeri Sembilan)	7 - 8	(Kuala Lumpur) **VIOBA Blues**	SMS Tuanku Jaafar, Kuala Pilah

==== Group B ====
Team	Played	Won	Drawn	Lost	Points for	Points against	Points difference	Bonus point	Points
**Navy ORCA**	2	2	0	0	40	13	+27	1	9
**USM Jokers**	2	1	0	1	32	25	+7	1	6
RMP Pahang	2	0	0	2	20	54	-34	0	2

**Navy Orca**	15 - 3	(Penang) USM Jokers	Lumut
**USM Jokers** (Penang)	29 - 10	RMP Pahang	USM, Penang
RMP Pahang	10 - 25	**Navy Orca**	SEMSAS, Kuantan

==== Group C ====
Team	Played	Won	Drawn	Lost	Points for	Points against	Points difference	Bonus point	Points
**UTP Drillers**	2	2	0	0	40	31	+9	9	
**Kelleys**	2	1	0	1	27	26	+1	1	6
Qubyx Lions	2	0	0	2	34	44	-10	2	4

Kelleys (Kuala Lumpur)	10 - 13	(Perak) **UTP Drillers**	Lembah Keramat
**UTP Drillers** (Perak)	27 - 21	(Putrajaya) Qubyx Lions	UTP, Tronoh
Qubyx Lions (Putrajaya)	13 - 17	(Kuala Lumpur) **Kelleys**	Putrajaya

==== Group D ====
Team	Played	Won	Drawn	Lost	Points for	Points against	Points difference	Bonus point	Points
**Terengganu RT**	1	1	0	0	15	14	+1	0	4
**Jerantut Rainforest**	1	0	0	1	14	15	-1	1	2

Jerantut Rainforest (Pahang)	14 - 15	**Terengganu RT**	Jerantut

Bold indicates teams that advanced to quarter-final.

Four points for a win, three for a draw, one for a loss, and no points for a bye.
One bonus point for the winning team scoring four or more tries (BP1), one bonus point for losing by seven or less by their opponent (BP2).
If teams are level on points in the standings at any stage, tiebreakers are applied in the following order:
• Difference between points for and against
• Total number of points for
• Number of matches won
• Aggregate number of points scored in matches between tied teams

=== Grouping Stage Matches ===
Week 1

4 February 2017	Homes of Warriors RC (Negeri Sembilan)	**7 - 8**	(Kuala Lumpur) VIOBA Blues	SMS Tuanku Jaafar, Kuala Pilah
16:30 (UTC+08:00)

4 February 2017	Navy Orca	**15 - 3**	(Penang) USM Jokers	Lumut
16:30 (UTC+08:00)

4 February 2017	Kelleys (Kuala Lumpur)	**10 - 13**	(Perak) UTP Drillers	Lembah Keramat
16:30 (UTC+08:00)

Week 2

11 February 2017	USM Jokers (Penang)	**29 - 10**	RMP Pahang	USM, Penang
16:30 (UTC+08:00)

11 February 2017	UTP Drillers (Perak)	**27 - 21**	(Putrajaya) Qubyx Lions	UTP, Tronoh
16:30 (UTC+08:00)

11 February 2017	Jerantut Rainforest (Pahang)	**15 - 14**	Terengganu RT	Jerantut
16:30 (UTC+08:00)

Week 3

18 February 2017	RMP Pahang	**10 - 25**	Navy Orca	SEMSAS, Kuantan
16:30 (UTC+08:00)

18 February 2017	Qubyx Lions (Putrajaya)	**13 - 17**	(Kuala Lumpur) Kelleys	Putrajaya
16:30 (UTC+08:00)

=== Final Round ===
Quarter-finals
25 February – UTP, Tronoh
(Perak) **UTP Drillers**	**41**
(Negeri Sembilan) Homes of Warriors RC	0
25 February – Kuala Terengganu
**Terengganu RT**	**51**
(Penang) USM Jokers	17
25 February – VI, Kuala Lumpur
(Kuala Lumpur) **VIOBA Blues**	**20**
(Kuala Lumpur) Kelleys	7
25 February – Lumut
**Navy Orca**	**11**
(Pahang) Jerantut Rainforest	8

Semi-finals
5 March – VI, Kuala Lumpur
(Perak) UTP Drillers	0
**Terengganu RT**	**13**
5 March – VI, Kuala Lumpur
(Kuala Lumpur) VIOBA Blues	13
**Navy Orca**	**15**

Final
12 March – Padang Bellamy, Kuala Lumpur
Terengganu RT
Navy Orca

Quarter-final

25 February 2017	**UTP Drillers** (Perak)	**41 - 0**	(Negeri Sembilan) Homes of Warriors RC	UTP, Tronoh
16:30 (UTC+08:00)

25 February 2017	**Terengganu RT**	**51 - 17**	(Penang) USM Jokers	Kuala Terengganu
16:30 (UTC+08:00)

25 February 2017	**VIOBA Blues** (Kuala Lumpur)	**20 - 7**	(Kuala Lumpur) Kelleys	VI, Kuala Lumpur
15:00 (UTC+08:00)

25 February 2017	**Navy Orca**	**11 - 8**	(Pahang) Jerantut Rainforest	Lumut
16:30 (UTC+08:00)

Semi-final

5 March 2017	UTP Drillers (Perak)	**0 - 13**	**Terengganu RT**	VI, Kuala Lumpur
14:30 (UTC+08:00)

5 March 2017	VIOBA Blues (Kuala Lumpur)	**13 - 15**	**Navy Orca**	VI, Kuala Lumpur
16:30 (UTC+08:00)

Final

12 March 2017	Terengganu RT	**v**	Navy Orca	Padang Bellamy, Kuala Lumpur
14:30 (UTC+08:00)

== See also ==
- Malaysia Rugby League Division 1
