= 2016 MRU Super League =

- Date: 23 January 2016 – 3 April 2016
- Champions: UPM Angels (1st title)
- Runners-up: Keris Conlay
- Relegated: KL Saracens; Panthers Blowpipes
- Matches played: 38

The MRU Super League 2016 was the 12th season of MRU Super League, Malaysia's domestic rugby union competition. The kick off will begin on 23 January 2016. The final was held on 3 April 2016 and won by UPM Angels, 16 - 13 over defending champions, Keris Conlay. It was the first title that were achieved by the Angels in their history.

== Teams ==
A total of 14 teams will compete in the 2016 season, increasing 2 teams from previous edition.

- (Kuala Lumpur) Cobra RC
- (Negeri Sembilan) NS Wanderers RC
- (Selangor) UPM Angels
- (Malaysia) UiTM Lions
- (Putrajaya) ASAS RC
- (Kuala Lumpur) Bandaraya Dragons RC
- (Selangor) KL Saracens
- (Pahang) Panthers Blowpipes
- (Kuala Lumpur) Keris Conlay RC
- (Johor) Iskandar Raiders
- JLJ Diraja
- (Johor) SSTMI Tsunami
- (Johor) Mersing Eagles
- (Malacca) Politeknik Merlimau

== Season ==
In preliminary stage, all 14 teams were divided into 2 groups, and a single round-robin tournament was held by both groups.

=== Standings ===
• Teams 1 to 4 (Green background) at the end of the preliminary competition rounds qualify for the final stage.
• The lowest-placed teams (Red background) were relegated.

Group A
| Pos | Team | Played | Won | Drawn | Lost | Points For | Points Against | Points Difference | Try Bonus | Losing Bonus | Points |
| 1 | Keris Conlay | 6 | 5 | 0 | 1 | 144 | 79 | +65 | 3 | 1 | 25 |
| 2 | UPM Angels | 6 | 5 | 0 | 1 | 185 | 116 | +69 | 4 | 0 | 24 |
| 3 | Iskandar Raiders | 6 | 3 | 0 | 3 | 195 | 143 | +52 | 3 | 2 | 20 |
| 4 | UiTM Lions | 6 | 3 | 1 | 2 | 131 | 123 | +8 | 3 | 0 | 20 |
| 5 | Mersing Eagles | 6 | 2 | 1 | 3 | 117 | 131 | -14 | 2 | 1 | 17 |
| 6 | ASAS RC | 6 | 2 | 0 | 4 | 107 | 118 | -11 | 1 | 0 | 13 |
| 7 | KL Saracens | 6 | 0 | 0 | 6 | 77 | 207 | -130 | 0 | 0 | 6 |
Group B
| Pos | Team | Played | Won | Drawn | Lost | Points For | Points Against | Points Difference | Try Bonus | Losing Bonus | Points |
| 1 | SSTMI Tsunami | 6 | 4 | 0 | 2 | 184 | 106 | +80 | 4 | 1 | 23 |
| 2 | NS Wanderers | 6 | 5 | 0 | 1 | 168 | 99 | +79 | 2 | 0 | 23 |
| 3 | DBKL | 6 | 4 | 0 | 2 | 130 | 110 | +20 | 2 | 0 | 20 |
| 4 | Politeknik Merlimau | 6 | 4 | 0 | 2 | 154 | 119 | +13 | 2 | 0 | 20 |
| 5 | COBRA | 6 | 3 | 0 | 3 | 138 | 186 | -48 | 3 | 0 | 17 |
| 6 | JLJ Diraja | 6 | 1 | 0 | 5 | 119 | 180 | -61 | 1 | 2 | 12 |
| 7 | Panthers Blowpipes | 6 | 0 | 0 | 6 | 112 | 195 | -83 | 0 | 1 | 7 |
Four points for a win, three for a draw, one for a loss, and no points for a bye. One bonus point for the winning team scoring four or more tries (BP1), one bonus point for losing by seven or less by their opponent (BP2). If teams are level on points in the standings at any stage, tiebreakers are applied in the following order: • Difference between points for and against • Total number of points for • Number of matches won • Aggregate number of points scored in matches between tied teams

=== Grouping stage matches ===
Week 1

| 23 January 2016 | Keris Conlay (Kuala Lumpur) | 14 - 5 | (Selangor) KL Saracens | UKM, Bangi |
| 15:00 (UTC+08:00) |

| 23 January 2016 | Mersing Eagles (Johor) | 0 - 17 | (Putrajaya) ASAS RC | UKM, Bangi |
| 17:00 (UTC+08:00) |

| 23 January 2016 | Iskandar Raiders (Johor) | 13 - 27 | (Malaysia) UiTM Lions | Pasir Gudang |
| 16:30 (UTC+08:00) |

| 23 January 2016 | Politeknik Merlimau (Malacca) | 42 - 27 | JLJ Diraja | Politeknik Merlimau, Merlimau |
| 16:30 (UTC+08:00) |

| 24 January 2016 | COBRA (Kuala Lumpur) | 39 - 22 | (Pahang) Panthers Blowpipes | UKM, Bangi |
| 15:00 (UTC+08:00) |

| 24 January 2016 | SSTMI (Johor) | 28 - 20 | (Negeri Sembilan) NS Wanderers | UKM, Bangi |
| 17:00 (UTC+08:00) |

Week 2

| 30 January 2016 | COBRA (Kuala Lumpur) | 27 - 10 | (Malacca) Politeknik Merlimau | UKM, Bangi |
| 15:00 (UTC+08:00) |

| 30 January 2016 | Keris Conlay (Kuala Lumpur) | 27 - 17 | (Putrajaya) ASAS RC | UKM, Bangi |
| 17:00 (UTC+08:00) |

| 31 January 2016 | JLJ Diraja | 28 - 26 | (Pahang) Panthers Blowpipes | UKM, Bangi |
| 15:00 (UTC+08:00) |

| 31 January 2016 | SSTMI (Johor) | 18 - 19 | (Kuala Lumpur) DBKL | UKM, Bangi |
| 17:00 (UTC+08:00) |

| 31 January 2016 | Mersing Eagles (Johor) | 28 - 19 | (Selangor) KL Saracens | UM, Kuala Lumpur |
| 16:30 (UTC+08:00) |

Week 3

| 13 February 2016 | UPM Angels (Selangor) | 0 - 28 | (Kuala Lumpur) Keris Conlay | UKM, Bangi |
| | | walkover |

| 13 February 2016 | COBRA (Kuala Lumpur) | 10 - 28 | (Kuala Lumpur) DBKL | UKM, Bangi |
| 17:00 (UTC+08:00) |

| 13 February 2016 | Mersing Eagles (Johor) | 25 - 20 | (Johor) Iskandar Raiders | Pasir Gudang, Johor |
| 16:30 (UTC+08:00) |

| 14 February 2016 | SSTMI (Johor) | 33 - 7 | (Pahang) Panthers Blowpipes | UKM, Bangi |
| 15:00 (UTC+08:00) |

| 14 February 2016 | JLJ Diraja | 14 - 37 | (Negeri Sembilan) NS Wanderers | UKM, Bangi |
| 17:00 (UTC+08:00) |

| 14 February 2016 | UiTM Lions (Malaysia) | 20 - 10 | (Selangor) KL Saracens | UM, Kuala Lumpur |
| 15:00 (UTC+08:00) |

| 17 February 2016 | UPM Angels (Selangor) | 30 - 17 | (Malaysia) UiTM Lions | UKM, Bangi |
| 16:30 (UTC+08:00) |

Week 4

| 20 February 2016 | UiTM Lions (Malaysia) | 31 - 17 | (Putrajaya) ASAS RC | UKM, Bangi |
| 15:00 (UTC+08:00) |

| 20 February 2016 | Keris Conlay (Kuala Lumpur) | 21 - 26 | (Johor) Iskandar Raiders | UKM, Bangi |
| 17:00 (UTC+08:00) |

| 21 February 2016 | COBRA (Kuala Lumpur) | 12 - 50 | (Negeri Sembilan) NS Wanderers | UKM, Bangi |
| 15:00 (UTC+08:00) |

| 21 February 2016 | UPM Angels (Selangor) | 22 - 17 | (Johor) Mersing Eagles | UKM, Bangi |
| 17:00 (UTC+08:00) |

| 21 February 2016 | JLJ Diraja | 13 - 15 | (Kuala Lumpur) DBKL | Bellamy Field, Sungai Besi |
| 15:00 (UTC+08:00) |

| 21 February 2016 | SSTMI (Johor) | 26 - 28 | (Malacca) Politeknik Merlimau | Bellamy Field, Sungai Besi |
| 17:00 (UTC+08:00) |

Week 5

| 27 February 2016 | Keris Conlay (Kuala Lumpur) | 27 - 21 | (Johor) Mersing Eagles | UKM, Bangi |
| 15:00 (UTC+08:00) |

| 27 February 2016 | COBRA (Kuala Lumpur) | 31 - 26 | JLJ Diraja | UKM, Bangi |
| 17:00 (UTC+08:00) |

| 28 February 2016 | UPM Angels (Selangor) | 39 - 37 | (Johor) Iskandar Raiders | UKM, Bangi |
| 15:00 (UTC+08:00) |

| 28 February 2016 | DBKL (Kuala Lumpur) | 11 - 13 | (Negeri Sembilan) NS Wanderers | UM, Kuala Lumpur |
| 15:00 (UTC+08:00) |

| 28 February 2016 | Politeknik Merlimau (Malacca) | 32 - 19 | (Pahang) Panthers Blowpipes | UKM, Bangi |
| 17:00 (UTC+08:00) |

| 28 February 2016 | KL Saracens (Selangor) | 17 - 34 | (Putrajaya) ASAS RC | UM, Kuala Lumpur |
| 17:00 (UTC+08:00) |

Week 6

| 5 March 2016 | Politeknik Merlimau (Malacca) | 12 - 20 | (Negeri Sembilan) NS Wanderers | UKM, Bangi |
| 15:00 (UTC+08:00) |

| 5 March 2016 | ASAS RC (Putrajaya) | 15 - 43 | (Johor) Iskandar Raiders | UKM, Bangi |
| 17:00 (UTC+08:00) |

| 6 March 2016 | DBKL (Kuala Lumpur) | 35 - 26 | (Pahang) Panthers Blowpipes | UKM, Bangi |
| 15:00 (UTC+08:00) |

| 6 March 2016 | UPM Angels (Selangor) | 55 - 10 | (Selangor) KL Saracens | UM, Kuala Lumpur |
| 15:00 (UTC+08:00) |

| 6 March 2016 | UiTM Lions (Malaysia) | 26 - 26 | (Johor) Mersing Eagles | UKM, Bangi |
| 17:00 (UTC+08:00) |

| 6 March 2016 | SSTMI (Johor) | 29 - 11 | JLJ Diraja | UM, Kuala Lumpur |
| 17:00 (UTC+08:00) |

Week 7

| 12 March 2016 | COBRA (Kuala Lumpur) | 19 - 50 | (Johor) SSTMI | UKM, Bangi |
| 15:00 (UTC+08:00) |

| 12 March 2016 | Keris Conlay (Kuala Lumpur) | 27 - 10 | (Malaysia) UiTM Lions | UKM, Bangi |
| 17:00 (UTC+08:00) |

| 12 March 2016 | Iskandar Raiders (Johor) | 56 - 16 | (Selangor) KL Saracens | UM, Kuala Lumpur |
| 17:00 (UTC+08:00) |

| 13 March 2016 | UPM Angels (Selangor) | 39 - 7 | (Putrajaya) ASAS RC | UKM, Bangi |
| 15:00 (UTC+08:00) |

| 13 March 2016 | NS Wanderers (Negeri Sembilan) | 58 - 12 | (Pahang) Panthers Blowpipes | UKM, Bangi |
| 17:00 (UTC+08:00) |

| 13 March 2016 | DBKL (Kuala Lumpur) | 30 - 22 | (Malacca) Politeknik Merlimau | UM, Kuala Lumpur |
| 17:00 (UTC+08:00) |

=== Final stage ===
Quarter-finals
19 March – UKM, Bangi
(Johor) Iskandar Raiders | 23
(Negeri Sembilan) NS Wanderers | 34
19 March – UKM, Bangi
(Kuala Lumpur) Keris Conlay | 36
(Malacca) Politeknik Merlimau | 0
20 March – UKM, Bangi
(Selangor) UPM Angels | 14
(Kuala Lumpur) DBKL | 10
20 March – UKM, Bangi
(Johor) SSTMI | 19
(Malaysia) UiTM Lions | 10

Semi-finals
27 March – UKM, Bangi
(Kuala Lumpur) Keris Conlay | 47
(Negeri Sembilan) NS Wanderers | 16
27 March – UKM, Bangi
(Selangor) UPM Angels | 20
(Johor) SSTMI | 15

Final
3 April – UKM, Bangi
(Kuala Lumpur) Keris Conlay | 13
(Selangor) UPM Angels | 16
Third place
3 April – UKM, Bangi
(Negeri Sembilan) NS Wanderers | 31
(Johor) SSTMI | 42

Quarter-finals

| 19 March 2016 | Iskandar Raiders (Johor) | 26 - 34 | (Negeri Sembilan) NS Wanderers | UKM, Bangi |
| 15:00 (UTC+08:00) |

| 19 March 2016 | Keris Conlay (Kuala Lumpur) | 36 - 0 | (Malacca) Politeknik Merlimau | UKM, Bangi |
| 17:00 (UTC+08:00) |

| 20 March 2016 | UPM Angels (Selangor) | 14 - 10 | (Kuala Lumpur) DBKL | UKM, Bangi |
| 15:00 (UTC+08:00) |

| 20 March 2016 | SSTMI (Johor) | 19 - 10 | (Malaysia) UiTM Lions | UKM, Bangi |
| 15:00 (UTC+08:00) |

Semi-finals

| 27 March 2016 | Keris Conlay (Kuala Lumpur) | 47 - 16 | (Negeri Sembilan) NS Wanderers | UKM, Bangi |
| 15:00 (UTC+08:00) |

| 27 March 2016 | UPM Angels (Selangor) | 20 - 15 | (Johor) SSTMI | UKM, Bangi |
| 17:00 (UTC+08:00) |

Third placing

| 3 April 2016 | NS Wanderers (Negeri Sembilan) | 31 - 42 | (Johor) SSTMI | UKM, Bangi |
| 14:30 (UTC+08:00) |

Final

| 3 April 2016 | UPM Angels (Selangor) | 16 - 13 | (Kuala Lumpur) Keris Conlay | UKM, Bangi |
| 16:30 (UTC+08:00) |

== See also ==
- MRU Super League
