= 2015 MRU Super League =

- Date: 17 February 2015 – 21 March 2015
- Champions: Keris Conlay (2nd title)
- Runners-up: COBRA
- Relegated: NS Wanderers RC; RMAF Blackhawks
- Matches played: 38

The MRU Super League 2015 was the 11th season of MRU Super League, Malaysia's domestic rugby union competition. It kicked off on 17 February 2015. The final was held on 21 March 2015 and won by Keris Conlay, 18 - 11 over COBRA.

== Teams ==
A total of 12 teams will compete in the 2015 season.

- (Kuala Lumpur) Cobra RC
- (Negeri Sembilan) NS Wanderers RC
- (Selangor) UPM Angels
- (Malaysia) UiTM Lions
- (Putrajaya) ASAS RC
- (Kuala Lumpur) Bandaraya Dragons RC
- RMAF Blackhawks
- (Kuala Lumpur) Keris Conlay RC
- JLJ Diraja
- (Johor) SSTMI Tsunami
- (Johor) Mersing Eagles
- (Malacca) Politeknik Merlimau

== Season ==
In preliminary stage, all 12 teams were divided into 2 groups, and a single round-robin tournament was held by both groups. Top 4 of each group were advanced to knockout stage, while the lowest placed team will be relegated to the National Inter-Club Championships (NICC) next year.

=== Standings ===
• Teams 1 to 4 (Green background) at the end of the preliminary competition rounds qualify for the final stage.
• The lowest-placed teams (Red background) were eliminated to the 2016 National Inter-Club Championships.

Group A
Pos	Team	Played	Won	Drawn	Lost	Points For	Points Against	Points Difference	Try Bonus	Losing Bonus	Points
1	UiTM Lions	5	4	0	1	158	90	+68	2	1	19
2	SSTMI Tsunami	5	4	0	1	183	117	+66	2	1	19
3	COBRA	5	3	0	2	100	125	−25	0	1	13
4	Mersing Eagles	5	2	0	3	103	136	−33	0	0	8
5	ASAS RC	5	1	0	4	99	138	−39	0	3	7
6	RMF Blackhawks	5	1	0	4	87	124	-37	0	2	6
Group B
Pos	Team	Played	Won	Drawn	Lost	Points For	Points Against	Points Difference	Try Bonus	Losing Bonus	Points
1	Keris Conlay	5	5	0	0	180	66	+114	2	0	22
2	UPM Angels	5	3	0	2	183	117	+66	2	1	19
3	DBKL	5	3	0	2	105	101	+4	0	1	13
4	JLJ Diraja	5	2	0	3	95	124	−29	0	0	8
5	Politeknik Merlimau	5	2	0	3	90	121	−31	0	3	7
6	NS Wanderers	5	0	0	5	65	144	-79	0	2	6
Four points for a win, two for a draw, and no points for a bye. One bonus point for the winning team scoring three or more tries than their opponent (BP1), one bonus point for losing by eight or less (BP2). If teams are level on points in the standings at any stage, tiebreakers are applied in the following order: • Difference between points for and against • Total number of points for • Number of matches won • Aggregate number of points scored in matches between tied teams

=== Grouping stage matches ===
Week 1

17 January 2015	COBRA (Kuala Lumpur)	22-12	(Johor) Mersing Eagles	UPM, Serdang
15:00 (UTC+08:00)

17 January 2015	SSTMI (Johor)	15-22	(Kuala Lumpur) RMAF Blackhawks	UPM, Serdang
17:00 (UTC+08:00)

18 January 2015	JLJ Diraja	38-14	(Negeri Sembilan) NS Wanderers	UPM, Serdang
15:00 (UTC+08:00)

18 January 2015	Keris Conlay (Kuala Lumpur)	15-22	(Malacca) Politeknik Merlimau	UPM, Serdang
17:00 (UTC+08:00)

Week 2

24 January 2015	Politeknik Merlimau (Malacca)	22-3	(Negeri Sembilan) NS Wanderers	UPM, Serdang
15:00 (UTC+08:00)

24 January 2015	COBRA (Kuala Lumpur)	13-6	(Putrajaya) ASAS RC	UPM, Serdang
17:00 (UTC+08:00)

25 January 2015	UiTM Lions (Malaysia)	37-10	RMAF Blackhawks	UPM, Serdang
15:00 (UTC+08:00)

25 January 2015	Keris Conlay (Kuala Lumpur)	33-16	(Kuala Lumpur) DBKL	UPM, Serdang
17:00 (UTC+08:00)

Week 3

31 January 2015	DBKL (Kuala Lumpur)	31-23	JLJ Diraja	UPM, Serdang
15:00 (UTC+08:00)

31 January 2015	COBRA (Kuala Lumpur)	24-20	RMAF Blackhawks	UPM, Serdang
17:00 (UTC+08:00)

1 February 2015	SSTMI (Johor)	27-20	(Malaysia) UiTM Lions	UPM, Serdang
15:00 (UTC+08:00)

1 January 2015	ASAS RC (Putrajaya)	22-27	(Johor) Mersing Eagles	UPM, Serdang
17:00 (UTC+08:00)

1 February 2015	Keris Conlay (Kuala Lumpur)	23-3	(Negeri Sembilan) NS Wanderers	UKM, Bangi
17:00 (UTC+08:00)

Week 4

7 February 2015	Keris Conlay (Kuala Lumpur)	22-19	(Selangor) UPM Angels	UPM, Serdang
15:00 (UTC+08:00)

7 February 2015	SSTMI (Johor)	60-19	(Kuala Lumpur) COBRA	UPM, Serdang
17:00 (UTC+08:00)

7 February 2015	NS Wanderers (Negeri Sembilan)	13-20	(Kuala Lumpur) DBKL	UKM, Bangi
17:00 (UTC+08:00)

8 February 2015	JLJ Diraja	21-7	(Malacca) Politeknik Merlimau	UPM, Serdang
15:00 (UTC+08:00)

8 January 2015	ASAS RC (Putrajaya)	29-20	RMAF Blackhawks	UPM, Serdang
17:00 (UTC+08:00)

8 February 2015	UiTM Lions (Malaysia)	25-14	(Johor) Mersing Eagles	UKM, Bangi
17:00 (UTC+08:00)

11 February 2015	UPM Angels (Selangor)	8-18	(Kuala Lumpur) DBKL	UPM, Serdang
17:00 (UTC+08:00)

Week 5

14 February 2015	COBRA (Kuala Lumpur)	22-27	(Malaysia) UiTM Lions	UPM, Serdang
15:00 (UTC+08:00)

14 February 2015	SSTMI (Johor)	29-25	(Putrajaya) ASAS RC	UPM, Serdang
17:00 (UTC+08:00)

14 February 2015	Mersing Eagles (Johor)	19-15	RMAF Blackhawks	UKM, Bangi
17:00 (UTC+08:00)

15 February 2015	UPM Angels (Selangor)	35-22	(Negeri Sembilan) NS Wanderers	UPM, Serdang
15:00 (UTC+08:00)

15 January 2015	Keris Conlay (Kuala Lumpur)	54-6	JLJ Diraja	UPM, Serdang
17:00 (UTC+08:00)

15 February 2015	DBKL (Kuala Lumpur)	20-24	(Malacca) Politeknik Merlimau	UKM, Bangi
17:00 (UTC+08:00)

18 February 2015	UPM Angels (Selangor)	18-12	(Malacca) Politeknik Merlimau	UPM, Serdang
17:00 (UTC+08:00)

Week 6

22 February 2015	UPM Angels (Selangor)	29-15	(Malacca) Politeknik Merlimau	UPM, Serdang
17:00 (UTC+08:00)

28 February 2015	SSTMI (Johor)	29-25	(Johor) Mersing Eagles	SSTMI, Bandar Penawar
17:00 (UTC+08:00)

28 February 2015	ASAS RC (Putrajaya)	17-49	(Malaysia) UiTM Lions	UKM, Bangi
17:00 (UTC+08:00)

=== Final stage ===
Quarter-finals
7 March – UPM, Serdang
(Kuala Lumpur) COBRA	23
(Selangor) UPM Angels	8
7 March – UPM, Serdang
JLJ Diraja	19
(Malaysia) UiTM Lions	36
8 March – UPM, Serdang
(Johor) SSTMI	45
(Kuala Lumpur) DBKL	12
8 March – UPM, Serdang
(Johor) Mersing Eagles	5
(Kuala Lumpur) Keris Conlay	17

Semi-finals
14 March – UPM, Serdang
(Kuala Lumpur) COBRA	34
(Malaysia) UiTM Lions	29
14 March – UPM, Serdang
(Johor) SSTMI	35
(Kuala Lumpur) Keris Conlay	43

Final
21 March – UPM, Serdang
(Kuala Lumpur) COBRA	11
(Kuala Lumpur) Keris Conlay	18
Third place
21 March – UKM, Bangi
(Johor) SSTMI	28
(Malaysia) UiTM Lions	33

Quarter-finals

7 March 2015	COBRA (Kuala Lumpur)	23-8	(Selangor) UPM Angels	UPM, Serdang
15:00 (UTC+08:00)

7 March 2015	JLJ Diraja	19-36	(Malaysia) UiTM Lions	UPM, Serdang
17:00 (UTC+08:00)

8 March 2015	SSTMI (Johor)	45-12	(Kuala Lumpur) DBKL	UPM, Serdang
15:00 (UTC+08:00)

8 March 2015	Mersing Eagles (Johor)	5-17	(Kuala Lumpur) Keris Conlay	UPM, Serdang
15:00 (UTC+08:00)

Semi-finals

14 March 2015	COBRA (Kuala Lumpur)	34-29	(Malaysia) UiTM Lions	UPM, Serdang
15:00 (UTC+08:00)

14 March 2015	SSTMI (Johor)	35-43	(Kuala Lumpur) Keris Conlay	UPM, Serdang
17:00 (UTC+08:00)

Third placing

7 March 2015	UiTM Lions (Malaysia)	33-28	(Johor) SSTMI	UKM, Bangi
14:30 (UTC+08:00)

Final

14 March 2015	COBRA (Kuala Lumpur)	11-18	(Kuala Lumpur) Keris Conlay	UPM, Serdang
16:30 (UTC+08:00)

== See also ==
- MRU Super League
