= Malaysia Rugby League Division 1 =

- Country: Malaysia
- Confederation: ARFU
- Divisions: 2nd
- Number of clubs: 12
- Level on pyramid: 2
- Promotion to: Malaysia Rugby League Premier
- Relegation to: Malaysia Rugby League Division 2
- Website: http://www.mru.org.my/web/
- Current: Current season

Malaysia Rugby League Division 1 is the second tier of rugby union league in Malaysia.

Formerly known as National Inter Club Championship (NICC), the league included various clubs from entire Malaysia, mostly the champions from the state league. The Malaysian Rugby Union (MRU) is the organizer of the league.

In 2017, the Super League and National Inter Club Championship (NICC) will be replaced with a more structured and more organized league system, an effort by Malaysia Rugby to be a professional sport in 2018. It also will attract more publicity and coverage by sponsors and local media to promote this sport to local citizens. The Super League will be renamed as Malaysia Rugby League Premier, and two new leagues were introduced to replace NICC, the Malaysia Rugby League Division 1 and Malaysia Rugby League Division 2.

== Teams ==
These teams will be playing in the Malaysia Rugby League Division 1 2017 season.

- (Selangor) KL Saracens
- (Kelantan) Kota Bharu RC
- (Kuala Lumpur) IIUM Mustangs
- (Kedah) SAHOCA RC
- (Perak) Silver Gaurus RC
- ATM Blackhawks
- (Johor) Iskandar Troopers
- (Selangor) KL Tigers
- (Johor) UTM Pirates
- (Perak) Edwardian Tiger
- (Johor) Beringin Rendang RC
- JLJ Diraja

== Champions ==
Season	Champions
2017	

== See also ==
- Malaysia Rugby League Premier
- MRU Super Cup
- Malaysia Rugby League Division 2
