= Malaysia Rugby League Premier =

- Founded: 2004
- Country: Malaysia
- Confederation: ARFU
- Divisions: 1st
- Number of clubs: 12
- Level on pyramid: 1
- Relegation to: Malaysia Rugby League Division 1
- Domestic cup(s): MRU Super Cup
- Current champions: UPM Angels
- Most championships: NS Wanderers RC (4)
- Website: http://www.mru.org.my/web/
- Current: 2017 Season

Malaysia Rugby League Premier is the top flight of rugby union league in Malaysia. In 2023 the league went entirely professional which attracted many overseas players.

Introduced in 2004, it was formerly known as MRU Super League, catered only to the top eight rugby union clubs in the country. The Malaysian Rugby Union (MRU) is the organizer of the league.

In 2017, the Super League and National Inter Club Championship (NICC) will be replaced with a more structured and more organized league system, an effort by Malaysia Rugby to be a professional sport in 2018. It also will attract more publicity and coverage by sponsors and local media to promote this sport to local citizens. The Super League will be renamed as Malaysia Rugby League Premier, and two new leagues were introduced to replace NICC, the Malaysia Rugby League Division 1 and Malaysia Rugby League Division 2.

== Champions ==
| Season | Champions |
|---|---|
| 2016 | (Selangor) UPM Angels |
| 2015 | (Kuala Lumpur) Keris Conlay RC |
| 2014 | (Johor) SSTMI Tsunami |
| 2013 | (Kuala Lumpur) Keris Conlay RC |
| 2012 | (Kuala Lumpur) COBRA |
| 2011 | (Kuala Lumpur) COBRA |
| 2010 | (Negeri Sembilan) NS Wanderers RC |
| 2009 | (Negeri Sembilan) NS Wanderers RC |
| 2008 | (Sabah) Sandakan Eagles RC |
| 2007 | (Negeri Sembilan) NS Wanderers RC |
| 2006 | (Sabah) Sandakan Eagles RC |
| 2005 | (Negeri Sembilan) NS Wanderers RC |

== Teams ==
These teams will be playing in the Malaysia Rugby League Premier 2017 season.

- (Kuala Lumpur) Cobra RC
- (Negeri Sembilan) NS Wanderers RC
- (Selangor) UPM Angels
- (Malaysia) UiTM Lions
- (Kuala Lumpur) Kelab Sukan DBKL
- (Putrajaya) ASAS RC
- (Pahang) Panthers Blowpipes
- (Kuala Lumpur) Keris Conlay RC
- (Johor) Iskandar Raiders
- (Johor) SSTMI Tsunami
- (Johor) Mersing Eagles
- (Malacca) Politeknik Merlimau

== See also ==
- MRU Super League seasons
- MRU Super Cup
- Malaysia Rugby League Division 1
- Malaysia Rugby League Division 2
