= Rugby union in Vietnam =

Rugby union in Vietnam is a minor but growing sport. There is no governing body for the sport as it is predominantly played by British expatriates within Vietnam. However, it does regularly host rugby tens tournaments for touring teams.

== History ==
Rugby was originally introduced when Vietnam was part of French Indochina, but this was mainly by French expatriates. After independence there was a long hiatus, as financial and political forces, from famine to the Vietnam War meant it was impossible for the game to be played. During the Vietnam War, soldiers from the Australian Army and the New Zealand Army played rugby whilst stationed in South Vietnam whilst being watched by locals. The historical connection with France is a mixed blessing. A number of people who could qualify for Vietnam's national team play in France. An example is the MHRC played François Trinh-Duc, who has a Vietnamese grandfather.

The Indochinese Cup was established in 1999, as a four sided tournament between Vietnamese teams from Saïgon and Hanoi, Vientiane (Laos) and Phnom Penh in Cambodia. By 2025, Vietnam does not have its own league system for rugby union established and only two domestic teams made up primarily of British expatriates. Hanoi 10s is the primary rugby tournament in Vietnam, with teams from across southeast Asia attending to play. There is no national rugby federation in Vietnam. Due to it mostly being played by expatriates, it was viewed as difficult to push for the establishment of a recognised one. In 2025, there was an application to the Vietnam Olympic Committee to send a rugby sevens team to the Southeast Asian Games but this was not agreed to by the Committee, on the grounds of a bigger player base being needed for the team to be competitive. The government of Vietnam announced it would support the establishment of one.

== See also ==
- Vietnam national rugby union team
