= Malaysia Rugby League Division 2 =

- Country: Malaysia
- Confederation: ARFU
- Divisions: 2nd
- Number of clubs: 12
- Level on pyramid: 3
- Promotion to: Malaysia Rugby League Division 1
- Website: http://www.mru.org.my/web/
- Current: Current season

Malaysia Rugby League Division 2 is the third tier of rugby union league in Malaysia.

Formerly known as National Inter Club Championship (NICC), the league included various clubs from entire Malaysia, mostly the champions from the state league. The Malaysian Rugby Union (MRU) is the organizer of the league.

In 2017, the Super League and National Inter Club Championship (NICC) will be replaced with a more structured and more organized league system, an effort by Malaysia Rugby to be a professional sport in 2018. It also will attract more publicity and coverage by sponsors and local media to promote this sport to local citizens. The Super League will be renamed as Malaysia Rugby League Premier, and two new leagues were introduced to replace NICC, the Malaysia Rugby League Division 1 and Malaysia Rugby League Division 2.
