= 2017 Malaysia Rugby League Division 1 =

- Date: 4 February 2017 – 12 March 2017
- Matches played: 19

The Malaysia Rugby League Division 1 2017 was the inaugural season of Malaysia Rugby League Division 1, Malaysia's domestic rugby union competition. The kick off will begin on 4 February 2017. Previously known as National Inter Club Championship (NICC), this season embarks the newly, organized league structure for more clubs to participate.

== Teams ==
A total of 12 teams will compete in the 2017 season.

- (Selangor) KL Saracens
- (Kelantan) Kota Bharu RC
- (Kuala Lumpur) IIUM Mustangs
- (Kedah) SAHOCA RC
- (Perak) Silver Gaurus RC
- ATM Blackhawks
- (Johor) Iskandar Troopers
- (Selangor) KL Tigers
- (Johor) UTM Pirates
- (Perak) Edwardian Tiger
- (Johor) Beringin Rendang RC
- JLJ Diraja

== Season ==
In preliminary stage, all 12 teams were divided into 4 groups of three teams, and a single round-robin tournament was held by all groups.

=== Standings ===
==== Group A ====
Team	Played	Won	Drawn	Lost	Points for	Points against	Points difference	Bonus point	Points
**JLJ Diraja**	2	2	0	0	56	13	+43	1	9
**UTM Pirates**	2	1	0	1	21	35	-14	0	5
Kota Bharu RC	2	0	0	2	23	52	-29	1	3

**JLJ Diraja**	22 - 3	(Johor) UTM Pirates	Port Dickson
**UTM Pirates** (Johor)	18 - 13	(Kelantan) Kota Bharu RC	UTM Skudai, Johor
Kota Bharu RC (Kelantan)	10 - 34	**JLJ Diraja**	Kota Bharu

==== Group B ====
Team	Played	Won	Drawn	Lost	Points for	Points against	Points difference	Bonus point	Points
**KL Saracens**	2	2	0	0	49	30	+19	1	9
**Edwardian Tiger**	2	0	1	1	29	31	-2	1	4
SAHOCA RC	2	0	1	1	25	42	-17	0	3

Edwardian Tiger (Perak)	17 - 19	(Selangor) **KL Saracens**	Esplanade, Taiping
**KL Saracens** (Selangor)	30 - 13	(Kedah) SAHOCA RC	UM, Kuala Lumpur
SAHOCA RC (Kedah)	12 - 12	(Perak) Edwardian Tiger	Kolej Sultan Abdul Hamid, Alor Setar

==== Group C ====
Team	Played	Won	Drawn	Lost	Points for	Points against	Points difference	Bonus point	Points
**Beringin Rendang**	2	2	0	0	57	34	+23	1	9
**IIUM Mustangs**	2	1	0	1	77	45	+32	1	6
Iskandar Troopers	2	0	0	2	12	67	-55	0	2

**IIUM Mustangs** (Kuala Lumpur)	48 - 7	(Johor) Iskandar Troopers	IIUM, Gombak
**Beringin Rendang** (Johor)	38 - 29	(Kuala Lumpur) IIUM Mustangs	Kota Tinggi
Iskandar Troopers (Johor)	5 - 19	(Johor) **Beringin Rendang**	Kota Tinggi

==== Group D ====
Team	Played	Won	Drawn	Lost	Points for	Points against	Points difference	Bonus point	Points
**Silver Gaurus RC**	2	2	0	0	87	13	+74	2	10
**KL Tigers**	2	1	0	1	29	58	-29	0	5
ATM Blackhawks	2	1	0	1	31	76	-45	1	2

ATM Blackhawks	8 - 52	(Perak) **Silver Gaurus RC**	Padang Bellamy, Kuala Lumpur
**Silver Gaurus** (Perak)	35 - 5	(Selangor) KL Tigers	Ipoh
**KL Tigers** (Selangor)	24 - 23	ATM Blackhawks	VI, Kuala Lumpur

Bold indicates teams that qualified to quarter-final.

Four points for a win, three for a draw, one for a loss, and no points for a bye.
One bonus point for the winning team scoring four or more tries (BP1), one bonus point for losing by seven or less by their opponent (BP2).
If teams are level on points in the standings at any stage, tiebreakers are applied in the following order:
• Difference between points for and against
• Total number of points for
• Number of matches won
• Aggregate number of points scored in matches between tied teams

=== Grouping Stage Matches ===
Week 1

4 February 2017	JLJ Diraja	**22 - 3**	(Johor) UTM Pirates	Port Dickson
16:30 (UTC+08:00)

4 February 2017	Edwardian Tiger (Perak)	**17 - 19**	(Selangor) KL Saracens	Esplanade, Taiping
16:30 (UTC+08:00)

4 February 2017	IIUM Mustangs (Kuala Lumpur)	**48 - 7**	(Johor) Iskandar Troopers	IIUM, Gombak
16:30 (UTC+08:00)

5 February 2017	ATM Blackhawks	**8 - 52**	(Perak) Silver Gaurus RC	Padang Bellamy, Kuala Lumpur
16:30 (UTC+08:00)

Week 2

11 February 2017	UTM Pirates (Johor)	**18 - 13**	(Kelantan) Kota Bharu RC	UTM, Skudai
16:30 (UTC+08:00)

11 February 2017	KL Saracens (Selangor)	**30 - 13**	(Kedah) SAHOCA RC	UM, Kuala Lumpur
16:30 (UTC+08:00)

11 February 2017	Beringin Rendang (Johor)	**38 - 29**	(Kuala Lumpur) IIUM Mustangs	Kota Tinggi
16:30 (UTC+08:00)

11 February 2017	Silver Gaurus (Perak)	**35 - 5**	(Selangor) KL Tigers	Ipoh
16:30 (UTC+08:00)

Week 3

18 February 2017	Kota Bharu RC (Kelantan)	**10 - 34**	JLJ Diraja	Kota Bharu
16:30 (UTC+08:00)

18 February 2017	SAHOCA RC (Kedah)	**12 - 12**	(Perak) Edwardian Tiger	Kolej Sultan Abdul Hamid, Alor Setar
16:30 (UTC+08:00)

18 February 2017	Iskandar Troopers (Johor)	**5 - 19**	(Johor) Beringin Rendang	Mersing
16:30 (UTC+08:00)

18 February 2017	KL Tigers (Selangor)	**24 - 23**	ATM Blackhawks	VI, Kuala Lumpur
16:30 (UTC+08:00)

=== Final Round ===
Quarter-finals
25 February – Kota Tinggi
(Johor) **Beringin Rendang**	**22**
(Johor) UTM Pirates	10
25 February – STAR, Ipoh
(Perak) **Silver Gaurus RC**	**42**
(Perak) Edwardian Tigers	3
25 February – Port Dickson
**JLJ Diraja**	**24**
(Kuala Lumpur) IIUM Mustangs	5
2 March – UM
(Selangor) KL Saracens	19
(Selangor) **KL Tigers**	**29**

Semi-finals
5 March – Padang Bellamy, Kuala Lumpur
(Johor) Beringin Rendang	12
(Perak) **Silver Gaurus RC**	**28**
5 March – Padang Bellamy, Kuala Lumpur
**JLJ Diraja**	**15**
(Selangor) KL Tigers	12

Final
12 March – UPM, Serdang
(Perak) Silver Gaurus RC
JLJ Diraja

Quarter-final

25 February 2017	**Beringin Rendang** (Johor)	**22 - 10**	(Johor) UTM Pirates	Kota Tinggi
16:30 (UTC+08:00)

25 February 2017	**Silver Gaurus RC** (Perak)	**42 - 3**	(Perak) Edwardian Tiger	STAR, Ipoh
15:00 (UTC+08:00)

25 February 2017	**JLJ Diraja**	**24 - 5**	(Kuala Lumpur) IIUM Mustangs	Port Dickson
16:30 (UTC+08:00)

2 March 2017	KL Saracens (Selangor)	**19 - 29**	(Selangor) **KL Tigers**	UM, Kuala Lumpur
16:30 (UTC+08:00)

Semi-final

5 March 2017	Beringin Rendang (Johor)	**12 - 28**	(Perak) **Silver Gaurus RC**	Padang Bellamy, Kuala Lumpur
14:30 (UTC+08:00)

5 March 2017	**JLJ Diraja**	**15 - 12**	(Selangor) KL Tigers	Padang Bellamy, Kuala Lumpur
16:30 (UTC+08:00)

Final

12 March 2017	Silver Gaurus RC (Perak)	**v**	JLJ Diraja	UPM, Serdang
16:00 (UTC+08:00)

== See also ==
- Malaysia Rugby League Division 1
