= COBRA Rugby Tens =

Rugby union competition

- Sport: Rugby Tens
- Founded: 1967
- Organizing body: COBRA Rugby Club of Malaysia
- No. of teams: 16
- Venue: Malaysia
- Official website: cobrarugby.com

COBRA 10s is the world's premier rugby tens tournament which is organized annually by the COBRA Rugby Club of Malaysia. The tournament is held each November at the MBPJ Stadium in Petaling Jaya, Malaysia.

The first COBRA 10s tournament was held in 1967. Today, 16 top teams from around the world compete for the coveted Hui Weng Chun Challenge Trophy and title as Tens champion.

HSBC Bank, a name globally recognised and synonymous with rugby had been the tournament's main sponsor from 2005 to 2012. Since 2013 COBRA has been organizing the tournament without a title sponsor but with the assistance two main sponsors; Carlsberg Marketing Malaysia and IJM Corporation Berhad. The club has also been supported by many other sponsors.

== Overview ==
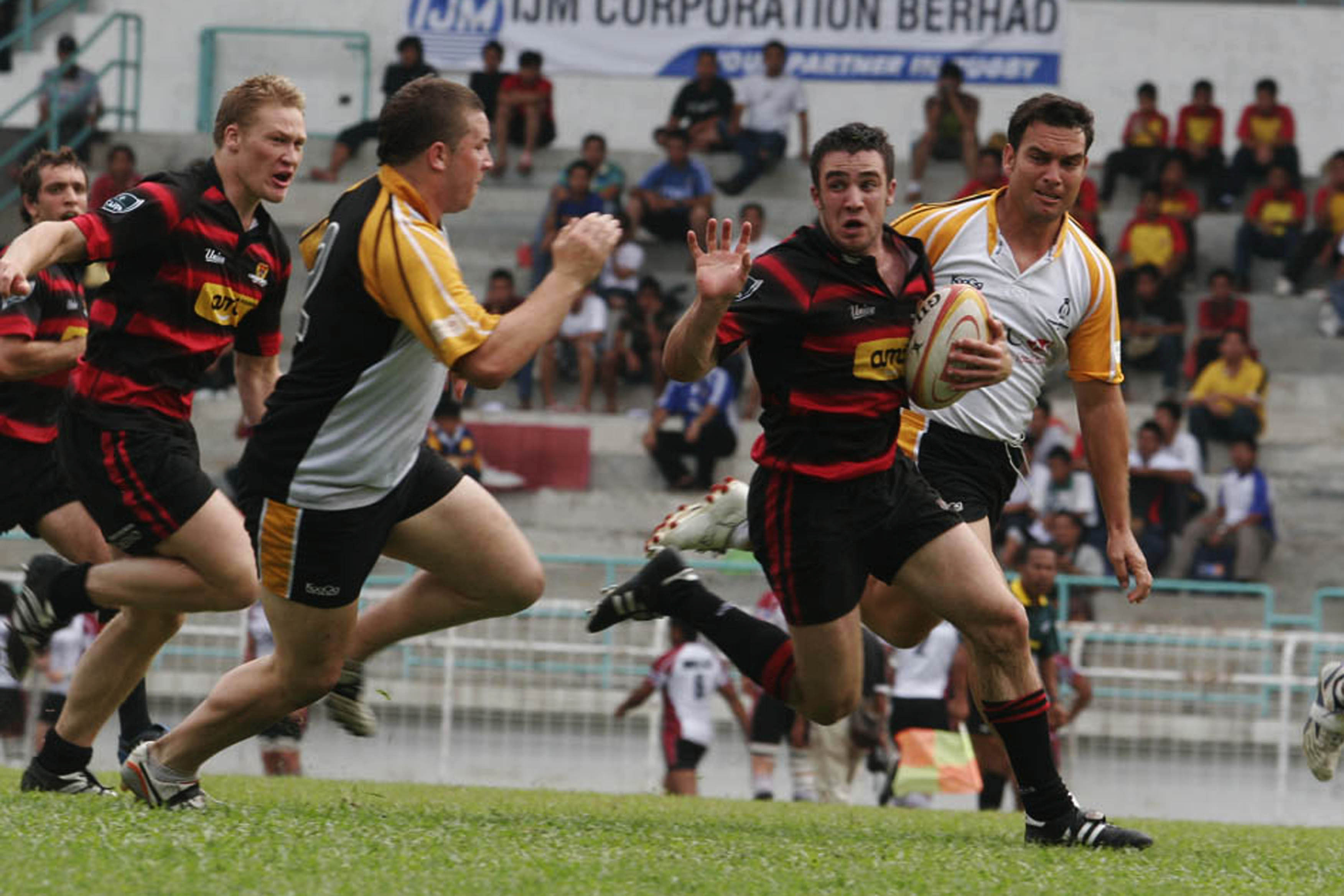
Canterbury Rugby Football Union (NZ) vs Penguin International RFC (UK)at the 2008 COBRA Tens

A Tens game lasts 20 minutes except for the final, which lasts 30 minutes. It is a variation of the popular game of rugby Sevens but more closely related to the rugby Fifteens format. The Tens allows both forward and back line play. The key factor here is all-round skills are translated into teamwork at fast pace.

Yearly, a total of 16 top teams from all over the world are invited to participate in this prestigious tournament which is played over two days.

== History ==
Although Malaysia may seem an unlikely place for the making of rugby history, yet it was here that 10-a-side rugby was born. The world's first 10 a-side rugby tournament was held in Malaysia in 1967. The Tens tournament was indeed a brainchild of a menagerie of Combined Old Boys Rugby Association (COBRA) members. The Tens game was conceived on the barstools of their favourite after match haunt. The idea was to create a format of play that is fast and open but still retains much of the character of the 15s version.

=== Early years ===
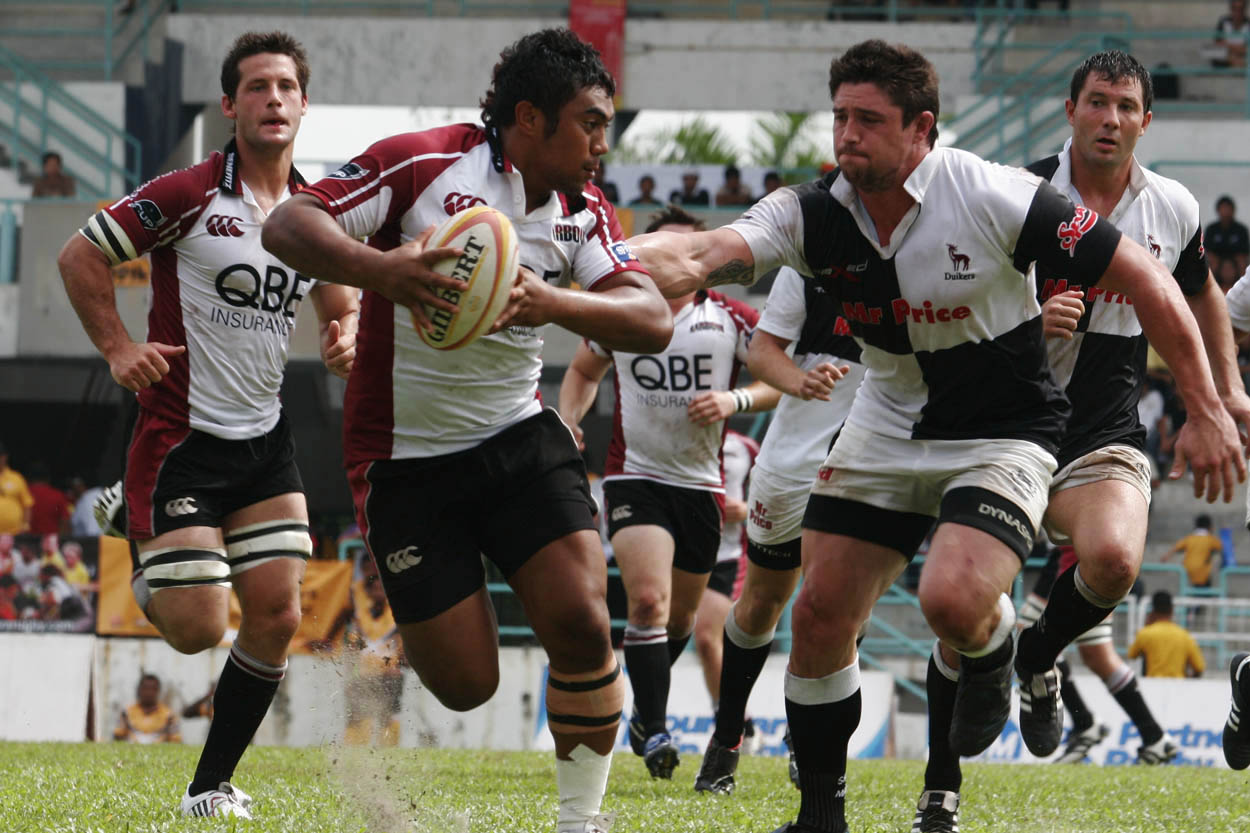
North Harbour Rugby Union (NZ) vs Duikers (South Africa) at the 2008 COBRA Tens

The COBRA 10s in its early years was mainly contested by local clubs and several invited foreign teams. The tournament was keenly contested between the expatriate- dominated Royal Selangor Club and COBRA. Then the military took over. First the Royal Australian Artillery Regiment, then the 16th and then 1st Royal New Zealand Infantry Regiment (RNZIR) made the 10s their own - except for brief interruptions by COBRA in 1972 and 1975. The RNZIR won it for seven consecutive seasons until most of them were shipped back to New Zealand, thus allowing the curiously named Bunnies to take the title in 1985. The Police took it for two consecutive seasons but the stragglers of the RNZIR, in their final year in Malaysia, wrested the trophy for one last time.

=== Recent events ===
In 1992, the COBRA Tens went fully international. That year Australian champions, Randwick of Sydney, defeated a very strong Marist St. Joseph of Samoa in a thoroughly fascinating encounter. For the first time, rugby luminaries, namely Lawrence Dallaglio (former England captain), Australian hooker, and later captain, Phil Kearns, and All Black Olo Brown played on Malaysian soil. Subsequent tournaments have featured internationals such as Tony Underwood (England), Waisale Serevi (Fiji), Brian Lima (Samoa), Uale Mai (Samoa), Amasio Valence (New Zealand) among many other notable names in rugby. Belgium Barbarians was invited in 2007.

== Venue ==
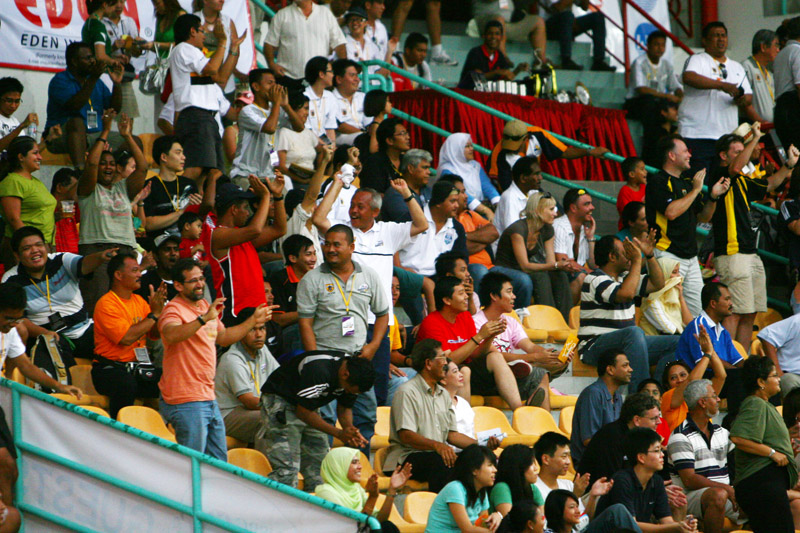
Crowd at the MBPJ Stadium during the 2007 COBRA 10s

The inaugural COBRA 10s tournament was held at the Astaka Field in Petaling Jaya in 1967 and during the tournament's early years, the Astaka field became the home of the Tens.

When the first fully international version of the COBRA 10s was introduced in 1992, the Kuala Lumpur Stadium in Cheras became the new home of the Tens and for subsequent tournaments till 1997.

Since then the COBRA 10s is held annually at the MBPJ Stadium in Petaling Jaya, Malaysia. The stadium, which was built in preparation for the 1998 Commonwealth Games, was also the venue for the Commonwealth Games Rugby Sevens. The COBRA 10s was brought back to the Astaka field in Petaling Jaya for brief moments in 1998 and 2009.

== Tournament format ==
=== Grouping of teams ===
16 teams will be grouped into four groups of four.

Group A	Group B	Group C	Group D
A1	B1	C1	D1
A2	B2	C2	D2
A3	B3	C3	D3
A4	B4	C4	D4

=== Day 1 - Preliminary round ===
The Preliminary Rounds shall be played in accordance with a round robin format. Each team shall play three matches against teams within their group.

Points will be awarded as follows :

- WIN - Two Points
- DRAW - One Point
- WALKOVER - Two Points
- LOSS - Zero (0) Points

=== Day 2 - Knockout round ===
In the second round, the two top teams in each group will advance to the Cup/Plate Championship Pool.

The 3rd and 4th placed teams in each group will advance to the Bowl Championship pool.

==== Cup Championship pool ====
Quarter-finals :

The winners in the Cup Championship pool will advance to the Cup Semi Finals (while the losers will advance to the Plate Semi Finals).

- A1 vs B2
- B1 vs A2
- C1 vs D2
- D1 vs C2

Cup Semi Finals :

Semi finals shall be played on a knock-out system

- Winner A1-B2 vs Winner C1-D2
- Winner A2-B1 vs Winner C2-D1

==== Plate Championship pool ====
The losers of the Cup/Plate Quarter Finals will advance to the Plate Semi Finals.

Semi Finals :

Semi finals shall be played on a knock-out system

- Loser A1-B2 vs Loser C1-D2
- Loser A2-B1 vs Loser C2-D1

==== Bowl Championship pool ====
Quarter-finals :

Quarter Finals will be played on a knock-out basis.

- A3 vs B4
- B3 vs A4
- C3 vs D4
- D3 vs C4

Bowl Semi Finals :

Semi finals shall be played on a knock-out system.

- Winner A3-B4 vs Winner C3-D4
- Winner A4-B3 vs Winner C4-D3

== Development activities ==
During the week of the tournament, rugby development activities are conducted with the assistance from participating teams. Among the activities organised are :

- Rugby coaching clinics for schoolboys
- Referees seminar
- Rugby friendlies with local teams

== Past champions ==
Year	Team	Country	Ref
2019	COBRA	Malaysia	
2018	Daveta	Fiji	
2017	Daveta	Fiji	
2016	Borneo Eagles	Malaysia	
2015	Penguin International RFC	United Kingdom	
2014	no tournament		
2013	Borneo Eagles	Malaysia	
2012	Davetalevu Rugby Club	Fiji	
2011	Penguin International RFC	United Kingdom	
2010	Penguin International RFC	United Kingdom	
2009	Borneo Eagles	Malaysia	
2008	COBRA	Malaysia	
2007	Canterbury Rugby Football Union	New Zealand	
2006	Penguin International RFC	United Kingdom	
2005	Marist St. Joseph	Samoa	
2004	Marist St. Joseph	Samoa	
2003	Red Rock	Fiji	
2002	no tournament		
2001	no tournament		
2000	Australian Barbarians	Australia	
1999	Tygerberg College	South Africa	
1998	COBRA	Malaysia	
1997	Fiji Rugby Union	Fiji	
1996	Marist St. Joseph	Samoa	
1995	New Zealand Māori (development side)	New Zealand	
1994	Penguin International RFC	United Kingdom	
1993	Penguin International RFC	United Kingdom	
1992	Randwick DRUFC	Australia	
Start of fully international tournament in 1992
1991	no tournament		
1990	Royal Malaysian Air Force Blackhawks	Malaysia	
1989	Republic of Fiji Military Forces	Fiji	
1988	1st Royal New Zealand Infantry Regiment	New Zealand	
1987	Polis Bersatu	Malaysia	
1986	Polis Bersatu	Malaysia	
1985	Bunnies Rugby Football Club	Australia	
1984	1st Royal New Zealand Infantry Regiment	New Zealand	
1983	1st Royal New Zealand Infantry Regiment	New Zealand	
1982	1st Royal New Zealand Infantry Regiment	New Zealand	
1981	1st Royal New Zealand Infantry Regiment	New Zealand	
1980	1st Royal New Zealand Infantry Regiment	New Zealand	
1979	1st Royal New Zealand Infantry Regiment	New Zealand	
1978	1st Royal New Zealand Infantry Regiment	New Zealand	
1977	Sembawang Tigers & COBRA	Malaysia & Singapore	
1976	1st Royal New Zealand Infantry Regiment	New Zealand	
1975	COBRA 'Muda'	Malaysia	
1974	1st Royal New Zealand Infantry Regiment	New Zealand	
1973	1st Royal New Zealand Infantry Regiment	New Zealand	
1972	COBRA 'A'	Malaysia	
1971	6th Battalion, Royal Australian Regiment	Australia	
1970	1st Battalion, Royal Australian Regiment	Australia	
1969	1st Battalion, Royal Australian Regiment	Australia	
1968	COBRA	Malaysia	
1967	Royal Selangor Club	Malaysia	
