= MRU Super Cup =

- Founded: 2004
- Country: Malaysia
- Confederation: ARFU
- Number of clubs: 8
- Level on pyramid: 1
- Website: http://www.mru.org.my/ver3/

MRU Super Cup is the top cup competitions of rugby union in Malaysia.

Introduced in 2004, the MRU Super Cup is contested only to the top four rugby union clubs in the MRU Super League. The Malaysian Rugby Union (MRU) is handling the cup competition.

== Past Finals & Champions ==
Year	Champions	Runners-up	Scores
2015	(Sabah) Sandakan Eagles RC	(Johor) SSTMI Tsunami	22-10
2014	(Johor) SSTMI Tsunami	(Sabah) Sandakan Eagles RC	25-06
2013	(Sabah) Sandakan Eagles RC	(Johor) SSTMI Tsunami	
2012	(Kuala Lumpur) Cobra RC	(Sabah) Sandakan Eagles RC	21-12
2010	(Negeri Sembilan) NS Wanderers RC		-
2009	(Sabah) Sandakan Eagles RC		-
2008		(Kuala Lumpur) Cobra RC	20 - 15
2007			-
2006	(Sabah) Sandakan Eagles RC		-
2005			-
2004			-

== See also ==
- MRU Super League
- MRU Super League seasons
- National Inter Club Championship
