= Penguin International RFC =

Invitational rugby union team based in Britain

Penguin International Rugby Football Club
- Nickname: Penguins
- Founded: 1959; 67 years ago
- Location: Little St James’s House, 11 Little St James’s Street, London SW1A 1DP
- Ground: none
- President: Richard E T Bennett
- Coach: Steve Hill
Team kit

First match
- Denmark, 1959

Official website
- www.penguinrugby.com

The Penguin International Rugby Football Club, usually called the Penguins, is an invitational rugby union team based in Britain but with international players. It was founded in 1959 and has played in 71 countries, claiming to be the most travelled sports club in the world. The motto is "On court le ballon à la main" (One runs with the ball in hand).

There is also a charity, The Penguin International Rugby Football Trust, registered with the UK Charity Commission under Charity No 1081047, founded 1999, to promote the training of young people in Rugby throughout the world, and which is active in 17 countries apart from the UK.

It has annual matches against the universities of Oxford and Cambridge. The 1988 one against Oxford was in memory of Peter Robbins, an alumnus.

The club plays teams of 7, 10 and 15 players. They first visited Asia with a tour of Sri Lanka in 1979, later doing well in the Hong Kong Sevens and winning the SCC International Sevens in Singapore in 2010. They have won the COBRA Rugby Tens in Kuala Lumpur six times. They won the Hong Kong Tens in 2013 and 2016.

== Club history ==
Penguin Rugby was founded in 1959 by the late Tony Mason (left for the club house in the sky in 2004) and Alan Wright, both players for Sidcup RFC, who subsequently became Vice Presidents of Sidcup RFC and Kent County RFU.

The Penguins are recognised as the premier touring club in the UK, having played in or against teams or coached from no less than 80 countries. Indeed, they are the most travelled rugby club in the world.

The principal objective of the club has been to foster, by coaching and playing, the development, goodwill and camaraderie of Rugby Union worldwide. The club's coaching and educational programme is organised by the Penguin International Rugby Coaching Academy, and this work is part-funded by the UK-registered charity the Penguin International Rugby Football Trust. The club's committee is drawn from 17 nations, all under the leadership of President Richard Bennett (Rosslyn Park and Kowloon).

Eminent past Presidents have included Field Marshall Sir Claude Auchinleck, GCB, CGIE, CSI, DSO, OBE, LLD (Commander-in-Chief of the 8th Army and Indian Army); Group Captain Sir Douglas Bader, CBE, DSO, DFC, FRAcS, DL (Britain's greatest ace fighter in World War II); Sir Robert Lawrence, CBE, ERD; D.H. Harrison, CBE (President, RFU 1966/1967); Air Commodore R.H.G. Weighill, CBE, DFC (Secretary, RFU 1973/1986); Sir Peter Yarranton (President, RFU 1991/1992) and club co-founder Alan Wright.

Although starting with XVs, the club has played a lot of 10s and 7s rugby as well. The club's first recorded abbreviated tournament was the Esher 7s in 1960. The club has played in all parts of the world, covering the Americas, Africa, Europe and Asia.

Over the years the club has competed in many tournaments and has recorded famous wins in the Hong Kong FC Tens, COBRA Tens in Malaysia, Middlesex 7s (the only time Waisale Servi and Eric Rush played together), the Italian 7s, the Stockholm 10s, the Nordic 7s, the Thai RU International 7s, The Grand Prix of Europe 7s, the Mexican RU International 10s, the Royal Kedah International 7s, the Borneo Invitational 10s, the Singapore Cricket Club 7s, and the London 10s. Also, the club made the semi-finals of the famous Hong Kong 7s twice, losing both times to the All Blacks.

The Clubs Coaching Academy was formed in 2003 by Alan Wright and Craig Brown and undertook its first engagement in 2004 in Hong Kong. Since the academy has travelled and delivering a mix of player development, coach development and general development of the game. The focus has been on children and youth rugby. The club also delivered many World Rugby formal coach and official courses around the world.

The club's women's team (the Rockhoppers) was formed in 2019, but we had to wait until 2022 before they took to the field. The first match was at the Benidorm 7s, and the first-ever Rockhopper point scorer was Emma Hennessy with a try.

The club's veterans team, the King Penguins, was formed in 2009 when the Penguins were lucky enough to play the Houses of Commons and Lords at Twickenham. Since this outing, the King Penguins are frequent tourists and always include a coaching, charity or community element in their itinerary. John Kerr is the current King Penguin President.

The international playing membership of the club has been drawn from no less than 34 countries, and distinguished captains have included Waisale Serevi (Fiji), Bill Calcraft (Australia), Rob Wainwright (Scotland), and Fergus Slattery, one of Ireland's most notable players. Recent famous players include Beauden Barret (All Blacks), Nehe Milner-Skudder (All Blacks), Owen Farrell (England), Megan Gaffney (Scotland), Joe Webber (All Black 7s), Tim Mikkleson (All Black 7s), Scott Waldrom (All Blacks, All Black 7s), Thomas Waldrom (England), and Jeff Williams (England 7s) and Dan Norton (England 7s).

== Club fixtures and tours ==
=== International tours ===
The Penguins have toured all over the world since 1959, with their first to Denmark, Sweden and Holland.

==== 1950-1959 ====
Year	Opposition	Captain
1959	Denmark, Sweden and Holland	Tony Mason (England)

==== 1960-1969 ====
Year	Opposition	Captain
1961	Denmark	Tony Mason (England)
1963	France and Switzerland	N. Mee (England)
1964	Belgium, Denmark and Sweden	Tony Mason (England)
1965	Germany and Belgium	Archie Hendrickses (South Africa)
1966	Portugal	Joe Armstrong (England)
1967	Malta	Tony Mason (England)
1968	Zambia	Bill Redwood (England)
1969	Denmark and Germany	David Powell (England)

==== 1970-1979 ====
Year	Opposition	Captain
1970	U.S.A. (California)	Colin MacFadyean (England)
1972	Zambia	Derek Morgan (England)
1973	Rhodesia and South Africa	Fergus Slattery (Republic of Ireland)
1974	Bermuda	Jim Flynn (Republic of Ireland)
1974	Jersey	John Frame (Scotland)
1974	Ireland	Martyn Davies (Wales)
1975	Portugal	Ally Black (Scotland)
1976	Scotland	Ian McLaughlan (Scotland)
1977	U.S.S.R. (Eastern European Inter-Nations Championship)	Bob Wilkinson (England)
1978	Bermuda	John Frame (Scotland)
1979	Sri Lanka	Mickey Quinn (Republic of Ireland)
1979	Jersey	Jacko Page (England)

==== 1980-1989 ====
Year	Opposition	Captain
1980	Argentina	Nick Martin (England)
1982	Zambia	John Cantrell (Republic of Ireland)
1983	Kenya	Vince Cannon (England)
1984	Brazil	Nick Martin (England)
1985	Jersey	David Pickering (Wales)
1985	Scotland - Jed Forest 7s	
1986	Bermuda	Micky Quinn (Republic of Ireland)
1987	Hong Kong 7s	Bill Calcraft (Australia)
1988	Hong Kong 7s	Bill Calcraft (Australia)
1988	Wales	David Pickering (Wales)
1989	Kenya	Peter Steven (Scotland)

==== 1990-1999 ====
Year	Opposition	Captain
1990	India (including the British Airways Calcutta Cup Centenary)	Kevin Rafferty (Scotland)
1990	Belgium	Bill Calcraft (Australia)
1991	Italian RU International 7s	David Millard (Scotland)
1992	Ireland - Irish RFU Aer Lingus International 7s	Colin Laity (Wales)
1992	Indonesia, Singapore, Hong Kong	Peter Cook (England)
1993	Malaysian RU-COBRA International 10s	David Pickering (Wales)
1993	Ireland	Paul Alston (England)
1993	Italian RU International 7s	Chris Sheasby (England)
1993	Malaysia and Singapore	Peter Cook (England)
1993	Dubai 7s	Phil Pask (England)
1994	Malaysian RU-COBRA International 10s	Craig Brown (New Zealand)
1994	Sweden & Denmark	Rob Wainwright (Scotland)
1994	Italian RU International 7s	Craig Brown (New Zealand)
1995	Uruguay Sevens	Craig Brown (New Zealand)
1995	Malaysian RU-COBRA International 10s	John Kerr (Scotland)
1996	Malaysian RU-COBRA International 10s	Craig Brown (New Zealand)
1997	Czech Republic and Hungary	Brent Pope (New Zealand)
1997	Singapore CC 50th International Rugby 7s Tournament	Nick Penny (Scotland)
1998	Croatia	Richard Kinsey (England)
1998	Brazil and Chile	Brent Pope (New Zealand)
1998	Singapore C.C. International Rugby 7s Tournament	Craig Brown (New Zealand)
1999	Croatia	Richard Kinsey (England)
1999	Czech Republic and Poland	Brian Cusack (Republic of Ireland)
1999	Thai RU's 1st International 7s Tournament	Cameron Pither (Australia)

==== 2000-2009 ====
Year	Opposition	Captain
2000	People's Republic of China	Brian Cusack (Republic of Ireland)
2000	Malaysia RU-COBRA International 10s	Sailosi Nawavu (Fiji)
2001	Germany and Argentina	Andre Fox (South Africa)
2001	Grand Prix of Europe 7s, Germany	Mike Friday (England)
2001	Thailand - King's Cup International 7s Tournament	Alan Bunting (New Zealand)
2002	Portuguese Rugby Federation International 7s	Waisale Serevi (Fiji)
2002	USA and Canada	Mark Denney (England)
2003	Malaysian RU-COBRA International 10s	David Gorrie (New Zealand)
2004	Hong Kong	Craig Degoldi (New Zealand)
2004	Mexico	David Gorrie (New Zealand)
2004	Malaysian RU-COBRA International 10s	Howard Graham (England)
2005	Malta International XVs	Gareth Taylor (Wales)
2005	Malaysian RU-COBRA International 10s	Howard Graham (England)
2006	Paris Tour	Rod Moore (Australia)
2006	Malaysia Tour (HSBC COBRA 10s & Royal Kedah 7s)	Uale Mai (Samoa)
2007	Hong Kong Football Club 10s	Craig Degoldi (New Zealand)
2007	Orkney RFC 40th Anniversity XVs Tournament	Paul Beal (England)
2007	Malaysia Tour (HSBC COBRA 10s and Borneo 10s)	Scott Waldrom (New Zealand)
2008	Hong Kong Football Club 10s	Craig Degoldi (New Zealand)
2008	Rome 7s	Marc Camburn (New Zealand)
2008	Malaysia Tour (HSBC COBRA 10s and Borneo 10s)	Jordan Smiler (New Zealand)
2009	Hong Kong Football Club 10s	James Afoa (New Zealand)
2009	HSBC COBRA 10s	Tony Penn (New Zealand)

==== 2010-2019 ====
Year	Opposition	Captain
2010	Hong Kong Football Club 10s	Nick Collins (New Zealand)
2010	Portugal	Marcus Dirollo (Scotland)
2010	King Penguins v Australian Parliament (Sydney)	Craig Brown (New Zealand)
2010	Singapore Cricket Club 7s	Nafi Tuitavake (New Zealand)
2010	HSBC COBRA 10s	Shane Christie (New Zealand)
2011	Hong Kong Football Club 10s	Jordan Smiler (New Zealand)
2011	King Penguins at Kowloon 10s	John Kerr (Scotland)
2011	Singapore Cricket Club 7s and HSBC COBRA 10s	Willie Walker (New Zealand)
2012	Hong Kong Football Club 10s	Willie Walker (New Zealand)
2012	Sweden Tour	Hugh Hogan (Republic of Ireland)
2012	King Penguins tour to Sweden	Brian Cusack (Republic of Ireland)
2012	Singapore Cricket Club 7s	Karl Bryson (New Zealand)
2012	HSBC COBRA 10s	Chris Smith (New Zealand)
2013	Hong Kong Football Club 10s	Reece Robinson (New Zealand)
2013	Rugby Rocks 7s - Edinburgh and Penguin Scottish Dinner	Stephen Hamilton (England)
2013	King Penguins v Australian Parliament (Sydney)	Tony Penn (New Zealand)
2013	Singapore Cricket Club 7s	Daniel Caprice (England)
2013	HSBC COBRA 10s	Kieron Fonotia (New Zealand)
2014	Hong Kong Football Club 10s	Willie Walker (New Zealand)
2014	King Penguins - Rwanda	Tony Penn (New Zealand)
2014	Singapore Cricket Club 7s	Harry Bergelin (Australia)
2015	Hong Kong Football Club 10s	Willie Walker (New Zealand)
2015	Germany Tour	Hugh Hogan (Republic of Ireland)
2015	Singapore Cricket Club 7s	Willy Hafu (Tonga)
2015	COBRA 10s	Kylem O'Donnell (New Zealand)
2016	Hong Kong Football Club 10s	Kylem O'Donnell (New Zealand); Antonio Kiri Kiri (New Zealand)
2016	King Penguins - France	Adam Buchanan-Smith (Scotland)
2016	Singapore Cricket Club 7s	Gareth Bautz (Australia)
2016	COBRA 10s	Sam Christie (New Zealand)
2016	Orkney	Simon Best (Republic of Ireland)
2017	Hong Kong Football Club 10s	Johan Bardoul (New Zealand); Shalom Suniula (United States)
2017	King Penguins - Malta	Ben Breeze (Wales)
2018	Czech Republic	Matt Price (England)
2018	Hong Kong Football Club 10s	Anthony Kiri Kiri (New Zealand)
2018	Uruguay and Argentina	Lewis Gjaltema (New Zealand)
2018	King Penguins - Slovakia	Neil Young (England)
2018	King Penguins vs Boroughmuir Reprobates	Iain Sinclair (Scotland)
2018	King Penguins at Doddie Weir tournament at Mackie FP RFC	Marcus DiRollo (Scotland)
2018	Philippines	Chris Walker (New Zealand)
2019	Hong Kong Football Club 10s	Thomas Waldrom (England) (New Zealand)
2019	Finland	Chris Walker (New Zealand)
2019	King Penguins - Gibraltar	Neil Young (England)

==== 2020-2029 ====
Year	Opposition	Captain
2022	Benidorm - Men's Team	Ruairi Campbell (Scotland)
2022	Benidorm - Women's Team	Holly Thorpe (England)
2023	Amsterdam - Men's Team	Billy McQueeney (Wales)
2023	Amsterdam - Women's Team	Anna Caplice (Republic of Ireland)
2024	Lisbon - Men's Team	Toby Arnold (New Zealand)
2024	Lisbon - Women's Team	Megan Gaffney (Scotland)
2024	Lisbon - King Penguins	Bruce Fair (England)
2024	Malaysia - COBRA 10s	Pele Cowley (Samoa)
2025	Bologna - Men's Team	Alex Seers
2025	Bologna - Women's Team	
2025	Malaysia - COBRA 10s	Tom Barham (New Zealand)

=== England based matches ===
The Penguins have successfully played all over England since 1960.

==== 1960-1969 ====
Year	Opposition	Captain
1960	Esher Sevens	
1967	Twickenham RFC Centenary Match	Archie Hendrickses (South Africa)
1967	Belgrano (on tour from Argentina)	Archie Hendrickses (South Africa)
1968	Bridgewater & Albion	
1969	Bridgewater & Albion	

==== 1970-1979 ====
Year	Opposition	Captain
1970	Bridgewater & Albion	
1970	Bedford Athletic	Archie Hendrickses (South Africa)
1979	Worthing RFC	

==== 1980-1989 ====
Year	Opposition	Captain
1980	Lewes RFC 50th Anniversary Match	
1981	Kent County Rugby Union Centenary Match	Hugh Burry (New Zealand)
1983	Sidcup Centenary Game	Simon Halliday (England)
1984	Chipstead 25th Anniversity Match	Nick Martin (England)
1987	Cambridge University	
1988	Oxford University	
1988	Cambridge University Volvo International 7s	A Woodhouse (England)

==== 1990-1999 ====
Year	Opposition	Captain
1991	Cambridge University	
1995	Oxford University	Tim Ewington (Australia)
1997	Oxford University	Craig Brown (New Zealand)
1998	Cambridge University	Crawford Henderson (Scotland)
1998	Oxford University	Crawford Henderson (Scotland)
1999	Oxford University	Paul Burke (Wales)
1999	Cambridge University	Richard Kinsey (England)
1999	Mosley - 125th Anniversary Match	Richard Kinsey (England)
1999	Middlesex Charity Sevens, Twickenham	Waisale Serevi (Fiji)

==== 2000-2009 ====
Year	Opposition	Captain
2000	Middlesex Charity Sevens, Twickenham	Waisale Serevi (Fiji)
2000	Coventry	
2001	Oxford University	
2002	British Universities	Tim O'Brien (Australia)
2002	Oxford University	
2003	Oxford University	
2004	Cambridge University	David Gorrie (New Zealand)
2004	Oxford University	David Gorrie (New Zealand)
2005	Oxford University	Pat Howard (Australia)
2005	Cambridge University	
2006	Cambridge University	
2006	Oxford University	
2007	Oxford University	Howard Graham (England)
2007	Cambridge University	Arthur Brenton (England)
2007	Falklands Taskforce Team	Howard Graham (England)
2008	Cambridge University	
2008	Oxford University	
2008	Sidcup (125th Anniversary Match)	Peter Clarke (England)
2008	Bedford Athletic (100th Anniversary Match)	Jon Phillips (England)
2009	Oxford University	Howard Graham (England)
2009	Cambridge University	Match cancelled - frozen pitch
2009	Houses of Lords and Commons RFC (PIRFC 50th anniversary and HL&C RFC 25th anniversary)	Alan Wright (England); Craig Brown (New Zealand)

==== 2010-2019 ====
Year	Opposition	Captain
2010	Cambridge University	Howard Graham (England)
2010	Oxford University	Howard Graham (England)
2011	Oxford University	Tom George (England)
2011	Cambridge University	Graham Barr (England)
2011	London 10s	Hugh Hogan (Republic of Ireland)
2012	Oxford University	Will Johnson (England)
2001	Oxford University	
2013	Cambridge University	Martin Nutt (England)
2013	Oxford University	Martin Nutt (England)
2013	Rugby Rocks 7s - Leeds	Tom Mitchell (England)
2013	Rugby Rocks 7s - London	Mike Ellery (England)
2014	Cambridge University	Howard Graham (England)
2015	Cambridge University	Steve Pape (England)
2015	Oxford University	Howard Graham (England)
2015	King Penguins at York RFC	Ian Warbrick (Scotland)
2016	Cambridge University	George Messum (England)
2016	Oxford University	Richard Matthews (England)
2017	Cambridge University	Matt Price (England)
2017	Oxford University	Ross Swanson (England)
2018	Cambridge University	Tom Malaney (England)
2018	Oxford University	(Match cancelled due to unforeseen circumstances)
2019	Cambridge University	
2019	Oxford University	

==== 2020-2029 ====
Year	Opposition	Captain
2020	Cambridge University	Dave O'Brien (England)
COVID-19
2022	Cambridge University	
2022	Oxford University	
2022	Pocklington 7s	
2023	Cambridge University	
2023	Oxford University	
2023	Pocklington 7s	
2024	Cambridge University	
2024	Oxford University	
2024	Pocklington 7s	
2025	Cambridge University	
2025	Oxford University	Oscar Larsson (Sweden) / Dave O'Brien (England)
2025	Pocklington 7s	
