= Lembah Keramat =

Suburb in Gombak, Selangor, Malaysia

Coordinates: 3.201403°N 101.7542093°E

Lembah Keramat is a place in Ulu Kelang, Gombak District, Selangor, Malaysia, but it uses a Kuala Lumpur postcode. It is known as a Malay reserved residential area.

Lembah Keramat also known as AU5, is located right beside the MRR2 Highway in Ulu Klang. Nearby areas including Taman Melawati, Kampung Pasir, Kampung Fajar, Taman Permata, AU4, and AU3
