= Rugby tens =

Variant of rugby union

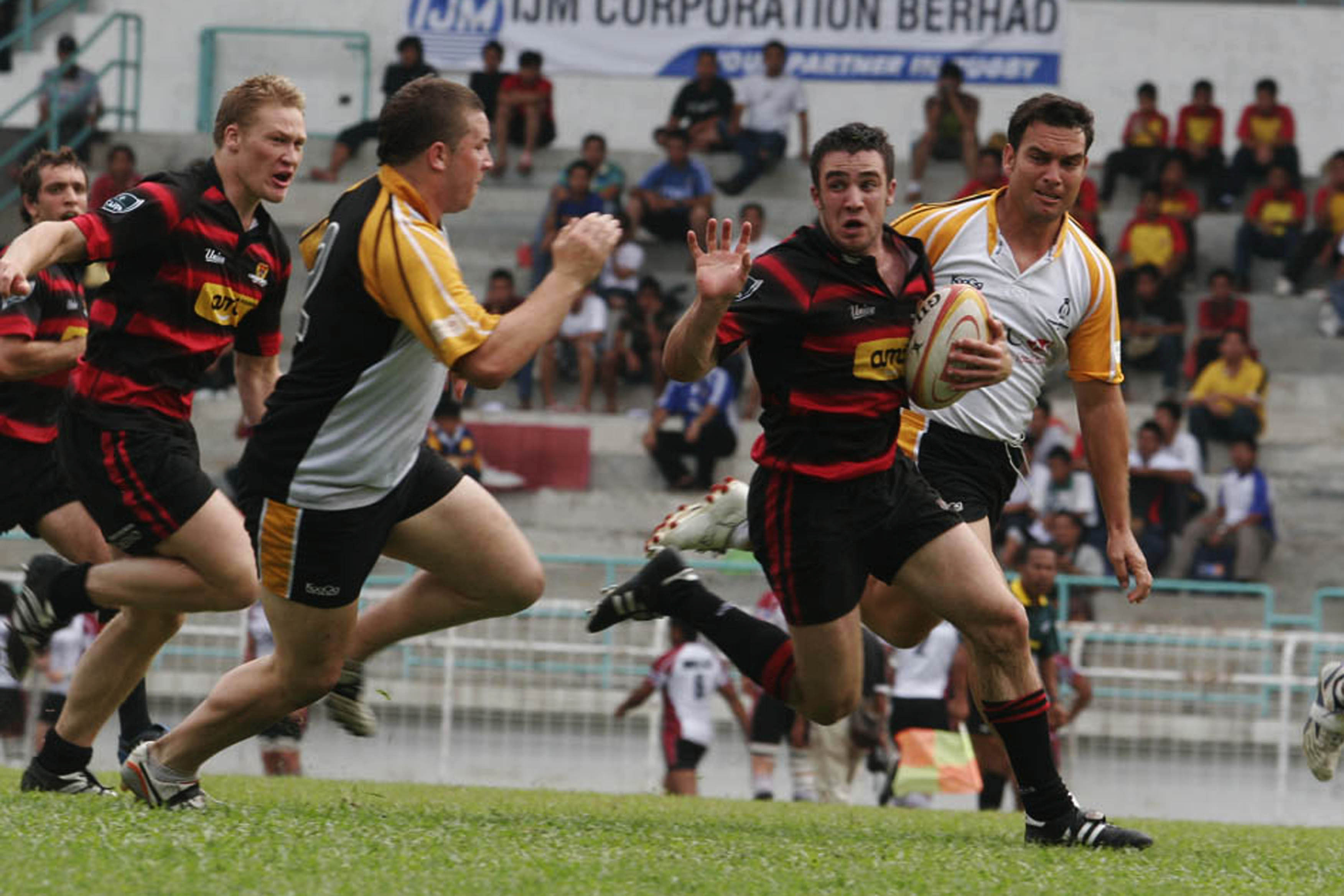
- Canterbury (NZ) vs Penguins (UK) at COBRA 10s, 2008
- Highest governing body: World Rugby
- Nicknames: Tens, Ten-a-side, 10's or 10s and Xs.

Characteristics
- Contact: Full Contact
- Team members: Ten
- Mixed-sex: Separate competitions
- Type: Team sport, outdoor, variant of rugby union

Rugby tens, (also known as ten-a-side and Xs) is a variant of rugby union in which teams consist of ten players, typically split into five forwards and five backs. Matches are significantly shorter than traditional rugby union games, usually consisting of two ten-minute halves. Unlike other prominent rugby union variants, such as sevens and beach rugby, which originated in established rugby-playing nations, rugby tens was developed in Malaysia, a nation that has never qualified for the Rugby World Cup.

The rules (law variations) are similar to rugby sevens and are published on the World Rugby website.

== History ==
Rugby tens was introduced by the Combined Old Boys Rugby Association (COBRA) of Malaysia in 1967 primarily, to enable Asian players to better compete with against larger-sized players from the traditional rugby playing nations. COBRA organized the first Rugby ten-a-side, tournament, COBRA 10s, that same year. It has grown from a local tournament into a prestigious international tournament, with more than 40 nations have been represented to date. Many players who have participated in the COBRA 10s have gone on to don national colours.

The game is fairly popular in Malaysia, Indonesia, Singapore, Republic of Korea and Thailand, and especially in South Africa where it is growing very fast. Other tournaments have been organised in Europe, Africa, Australasia and North America.

== Features of the game ==
A rugby tens match has two halves of 10 minutes each, though the tournament organiser may change this rule. The scrum has five players, instead of eight as in rugby XV or three as in rugby sevens.

== Tournaments ==
Major rugby tens tournaments include:

- COBRA Rugby Tens (since 1967)
- Hong Kong Football Club Tens (since 1986),
- Cape Town Tens (since 2009)
- World Club 10s (2014-2018)
- Brisbane Global Rugby Tens (2017-2018)
- Flanders Open Rugby (since 1993),
- Manila 10s (since 1989)
- Stockholm 10s (since 1993)

The popular Cape Town Tens attracts teams from all over the world to South Africa during the first week of February each year.
