= NS Wanderers RC =

(Malaysia) NS Wanderers RC
- Founded: 1984
- Location: Seremban, Negeri Sembilan
- President: (Malaysia)
- Coach: (Malaysia) Noor Akmal Mohd Nor
- Captain: (Malaysia) Ahmad Farid Abdul Rahman
- League: MRU Super League

NS Wanderers RC, formed in 1984, is a professional Malaysian rugby union club that plays in the city of Seremban in the state of Negeri Sembilan, Malaysia. It competes in the MRU Super League, the top level of the Malaysian rugby union league system. The club was founded in 1950s.

== Club honours ==
- MRU Super League
  - Champions:
  - Runners-up:
- MRU Super Cup
  - Champions:
  - Runners-up:
- National Inter Club Championship
  - Champions: 2002, 2007, 2008
  - Runners-up:
- Agong Cup
  - Champions:
  - Runners-ups:

== Notes and references ==
Irishman Ken McDonnell enjoyed a brief successful period with Wanderers. Winning two championships. He would leave with the unique record of being the only Irishman to win a club rugby championship anywhere in Asia.
