= COBRA Rugby Club of Malaysia =

COBRA RUGBY CLUB
- Full name: COBRA RUGBY CLUB
- Founded: 1967
- Location: 7, Lorong Utara B, Jalan Utara 46200 Petaling Jaya, Malaysia Tel : +603-7957 4045 Fax : +603-7957 3375
- Ground(s): Astaka Field
- President: (Malaysia) Lt. Col (Retd) Tommy Pereira

Official website
- www.cobrarugby.com

The COBRA RUGBY CLUB is a rugby club in Malaysia under the Selangor Rugby Union and Malaysia Rugby Union. Over the years COBRA has produced rugby players at the national and state level. It was originally known as the Combined Old Boys Rugby Association (COBRA).

== History ==
COBRA was formed on 8 June 1967 in Petaling Jaya, Malaysia.

== Teams ==
COBRA fields six rugby teams:

- COBRA Blacks (1st XV)
- COBRA Stings (2nd XV)
- COBRA Development (Under 19s)
- COBRA Venom (Ladies)
- COBRATS (Junior Section Ages 5–16)
- COBRA Legends (Veterans aged 35 and above)

All trainings are located at the Padang Astaka which is located adjacent to the clubhouse.

COBRA's 15-a-side season starts from January to April yearly. Following that, the club participates in 7 a-side and 10 a-side tournaments organized by the local Unions and several tournaments abroad. The club has approximately 200 active members.

== Club Achievements ==
2012

- The Malaysia Rugby Union Super League (MRSL) – Champion (15-a-side)

2011

- The Malaysia Rugby Union Ten-a-side Tournament – Champion (10-a-side)
- The Malaysia Rugby Union Super League (MRSL) – Champion (15-a-side)
- Negeri Sembilan Royal 7s – Champion (7-a-side)
- Putrajaya 7s – Champion (7-a-side)

For the year 2011, 7 players from COBRA were represented in the Malaysian rugby team.

2010

- The Malaysia Rugby Union National Super League (15s) – Runner-up

== Past Presidents and Current ==
The club's current president is Mr Boon Hoon Chee who succeeded Y.Bhg. Tan Sri Dato' Krishnan Tan who was the club's president for over a decade and played an instrumental part in developing and building its solid foundation.

== Clubhouse ==
The COBRA Clubhouse is situated at Lorong Utara, along Jalan Utara in Petaling Jaya, Selangor. Through the initiatives of its members, the COBRA Clubhouse was constructed in 1985. In 2002, the Clubhouse underwent renovation. COBRA is the first rugby club in Malaysia with its OWN Clubhouse.

== Home of the 10s ==
COBRA is the home of 10-a-side rugby or better known as rugby tens. COBRA introduced the world's first rugby tens tournament in 1967 and in 1992 the tournament went international with participation from top clubs and Unions from around the world. The tournament, the COBRA Rugby Tens, is usually organised on an annual basis at the Majlis Perbadaran Petaling Jaya (MBPJ) Stadium.

== Awards and recognitions ==
=== National Sports Leadership Award ===
In 1996, COBRA was awarded the National Sports Leadership Award by the National Sports Council of Malaysia for their contribution towards the promotion and development of rugby in Malaysia.

=== International Olympic Council Diploma ===
In 2002, COBRA was awarded the IOC Diploma by the International Olympic Council for its contribution to sports.
