= Malaysia Rugby =

Sport national governing body

Malaysia Rugby Union
Kesatuan Ragbi Malaysia
- Sport: Rugby union
- Founded: 1921 (as Malaya Rugby Union)
- World Rugby affiliation: 1988
- ARFU affiliation: 1987
- President: En. Amir Amri Bin Mohamad

Malaysia Rugby, formerly known as Malaysia Rugby Union (Malay: Kesatuan Ragbi Malaysia) is the governing body for rugby union in Malaysia. It was founded in 1921 and joined the International Rugby Football Board, later known as the International Rugby Board and now as World Rugby, in 1988. They organize the annual Malaysia Sevens tournament and few local tournament

== History ==
The Malaya Rugby Union (as it was then) was founded in 1921 and joined the IRFB in 1988. The founder members were Selangor, Ipoh District, Singapore, Malacca and Negeri Sembilan.

It is a founding member of the Asian Rugby Football Union.

In 2016, following the re-branding of World Rugby and Asia Rugby, the Malaysia Rugby Union was renamed as Malaysia Rugby.

== Council members 2010–2015 ==
- President : Dato' Wira Amiruddin Embi
- Deputy President : Tan Sri Dato' Wira Abd. Halim bin Hj. Karim
- Vice President : Mohd. Zamrin bin Datuk Dr. Yassin
- Honorary Secretary-General : M. Suhaimi Zainuddin
- Assistant Honorary Secretary-General : Mohd. Herwan bin Sairon
- Honorary Treasurer : Abang Najamuddin Jamlus

== Exco Members 2023-2027 ==
- President: Amir Amri Bin Mohamad
- Deputy President: Mohd Azmir Bin Zainul Abidin
- Vice President: Syamsul Erwin Bin Muhamad Lagis, Abdul Rashid Bin Adlie
- EXCO Members: Nik Ramadhan Bin Nik Abdullah, Mohammad Faeez Bin Mohamad Alias, Muhammad Najib Bin Hamzah, Hamrizal Bin Hamdan, Shahizam Bin Tukiran, Hazeline Aasyiqeen Binti Jaafar
- Honorary Secretary General: Mohamad Fahmy Bin Abd Jalil
- Honorary Treasurer:

Che Mohd Zulkarnain Bin Abd Wahab

== Affiliates ==
- Selangor Rugby Union
- Perlis Rugby Association
- Kedah Rugby Association
- Johor Rugby Union
- Terengganu Rugby Association
- Kelantan Rugby Association
- Negeri Sembilan Rugby Union
- Perak Rugby Union
- Labuan Rugby Association
- Pahang Rugby Union
- Sarawak Rugby Union
- Malacca Rugby Union
- Kuala Lumpur Rugby Union
- Sabah Rugby Union
- Royal Malaysian Police Sport Council
- Malaysian Armed Forces Sport Council
- Putrajaya Rugby Association

== See also ==
- Malaysia national rugby union team
- MRU Super League
- MRU Super Cup
- Rugby union in Malaysia
