= 2017 Brisbane Global Rugby Tens =

Brisbane Global 10s
Tournament information
- Dates: 11–12 February 2017
- Venue: Suncorp Stadium
- Teams: 14
- Website: brisbaneglobaltens.com

Tournament statistics
- Matches played: 22
- Points scored: 535 (24.32 per match)

The 2017 Brisbane Global Tens was the inaugural Brisbane Global Tens rugby union tournament, with all five of New Zealand's Super Rugby teams, all four of Australia's Super Rugby teams contesting for the title as the core sides, while the Blue Bulls of South Africa, the Panasonic Wild Knights of Japan, Toulon of France, and Manu Samoa competed as invitational sides. It was held at Suncorp Stadium. The draw was released on 16 November 2016. The prize money was AU$1.6 million.

The tournament was won by the Chiefs who defeated the Crusaders in the final 12-5.

== Squads ==
There were expected to be up to 500 players named across the 14 squads of the teams competing in the 2017 Brisbane Global Tens. Each team was also allocated a "Legend Wildcard", allowing each team to select a former player of high stature, significance and/or legacy to their former club to join the additional match day squad.

Note that players in bold indicates they are internationally capped at test level, while players in italics were an allocated "Legend Wildcard" for their side.

All ages were correct on 2 February 2017.

=== Blues ===
Player	Position	Date of birth (age)
Joe Royal	Hooker	31 May 1985 (age 31)
Sam Prattley	Prop	16 January 1990 (age 27)
Marcel Renata	Prop	24 February 1994 (age 22)
Josh Goodhue	Lock	13 June 1995 (age 21)
Brandon Nansen	Lock	3 November 1993 (age 23)
Tom Robinson	Lock	DOB unknown
Scott Scrafton	Lock	18 April 1993 (age 23)
Hapakuki Moala-Liava’a	Loose forward	9 November 1996 (age 20)
Kara Pryor	Loose forward	2 April 1991 (age 25)
Murphy Taramai	Loose forward	17 August 1992 (age 24)
Billy Guyton	Halfback	17 March 1990 (age 26)
Sam Nock	Halfback	18 June 1996 (age 20)
Stephen Perofeta	First Five-Eighth	12 March 1997 (age 19)
Pasqualle Dunn	Midfielder	29 March 1994 (age 22)
**George Moala**	Midfielder	5 November 1990 (age 26)
**Rene Ranger**	Midfielder	30 September 1986 (age 30)
Matt Vaega	Midfielder	7 September 1994 (age 22)
Ambrose Curtis	Outside Back	17 April 1992 (age 24)
Matt Duffie	Outside Back	16 August 1990 (age 26)
Declan O'Donnell	Outside Back	28 November 1990 (age 26)
Jordan Trainor	Outside Back	31 January 1996 (age 21)

=== Brumbies ===
Player	Position	Date of birth (age)
Robbie Abel	Hooker	4 July 1989 (age 27)
**Saia Fainga'a**	Hooker	2 February 1987 (age 30)
**Allan Alaalatoa**	Prop	28 January 1994 (age 23)
Leslie Leulua’iali’i-Makin	Prop	2 January 1992 (age 25)
Nic Mayhew	Prop	28 November 1988 (age 28)
**Scott Sio**	Prop	16 October 1991 (age 25)
Blake Enever	Lock	12 October 1991 (age 25)
Tom Staniforth	Lock	13 August 1994 (age 22)
Chris Alcock	Loose forward	24 June 1988 (age 28)
Jarrad Butler	Loose forward	20 July 1991 (age 25)
Lolo Fakaosilea	Loose forward	10 June 1995 (age 21)
Ben Hyne	Loose forward	7 March 1994 (age 22)
Jordan Smiler	Loose forward	19 June 1985 (age 31)
**Tomás Cubelli**	Halfback	12 June 1989 (age 27)
Joe Powell	Halfback	11 April 1994 (age 22)
Jordan Jackson-Hope	First Five-Eighth	4 May 1996 (age 20)
**Stephen Larkham**	First Five-Eighth	29 May 1974 (age 42)
Nick Jooste	First Five-Eighth	7 July 1997 (age 19)
**Kyle Godwin**	Midfielder	30 July 1992 (age 24)
**Tevita Kuridrani**	Midfielder	31 March 1991 (age 25)
Andrew Smith	Midfielder	10 January 1985 (age 32)
Tom Banks	Outside Back	18 June 1994 (age 22)
**Henry Speight**	Outside Back	25 March 1988 (age 28)
Lausii Taliauli	Outside Back	8 June 1993 (age 23)
Aidan Toua	Outside Back	19 January 1990 (age 27)
**Andrew Walker**	Outside Back	22 November 1973 (age 43)

=== Chiefs ===
Player	Position	Date of birth (age)
**Hika Elliot**	Hooker	22 January 1986 (age 31)
Liam Polwart	Hooker	2 April 1995 (age 21)
Siegfried Fisiihoi	Prop	8 June 1987 (age 29)
Mitchell Graham	Prop	30 January 1991 (age 26)
Sefo Kautai	Prop	16 August 1996 (age 20)
Atu Moli	Prop	12 June 1995 (age 21)
Sam Caird	Lock	18 March 1997 (age 19)
Fin Hoeata	Lock	28 December 1996 (age 20)
Lachlan Boshier	Loose forward	16 November 1994 (age 22)
Mitchell Brown	Loose forward	15 August 1993 (age 23)
Luke Jacobson	Loose forward	20 April 1997 (age 19)
**Liam Messam**	Loose forward	25 March 1984 (age 32)
Taleni Seu	Loose forward	26 December 1993 (age 23)
Finlay Christie	Halfback	19 September 1994 (age 22)
Jonathan Taumateine	Halfback	28 September 1996 (age 20)
**Brad Weber**	Halfback	17 January 1991 (age 26)
Luteru Laulala	First Five-Eighth	30 May 1995 (age 21)
Alex Nankivell	Midfielder	DOB unknown (age 19)
Dwayne Sweeney	Midfielder	8 August 1984 (age 32)
Solomon Alaimalo	Outside Back	27 December 1995 (age 21)
**Tim Nanai-Williams**	Outside Back	12 June 1989 (age 27)
Joe Ravouvou	Outside Back	21 March 1991 (age 25)
Sevu Reece	Outside Back	13 February 1997 (age 19)
Shaun Stevenson	Outside Back	14 November 1996 (age 20)
Sheridan Tovio	Outside Back	DOB unknown (age 19)
Latu Vaeno	Outside Back	5 January 1995 (age 22)

=== Crusaders ===
Player	Position	Date of birth (age)
Ben Funnell	Hooker	6 June 1990 (age 26)
Andrew Makalio	Hooker	22 January 1992 (age 25)
Michael Alaalatoa	Prop	28 August 1991 (age 25)
Chris Gawler	Prop	14 December 1993 (age 23)
Oliver Jager	Prop	5 July 1995 (age 21)
Tim Perry	Prop	1 August 1988 (age 28)
Mitchell Dunshea	Lock	18 November 1995 (age 21)
Quinten Strange	Lock	21 August 1996 (age 20)
Jed Brown	Loose forward	12 March 1991 (age 25)
Whetu Douglas	Loose forward	18 April 1991 (age 25)
Pete Samu	Loose forward	17 December 1991 (age 25)
Jordan Taufua	Loose forward	29 January 1992 (age 25)
Leon Fukofuka	Halfback	8 September 1994 (age 22)
Bryn Hall	Halfback	3 February 1992 (age 24)
Mitchell Hunt	First Five-Eighth	19 June 1995 (age 21)
Marty McKenzie	First Five-Eighth	14 August 1992 (age 24)
Jack Goodhue	Midfielder	13 June 1995 (age 21)
David Havili	Midfielder	23 December 1994 (age 22)
**Seta Tamanivalu**	Midfielder	23 July 1992 (age 24)
Sean Wainui	Midfielder	23 October 1995 (age 21)
George Bridge	Outside Back	1 April 1995 (age 21)
Sione Fifita	Outside Back	17 April 1990 (age 26)
**Digby Ioane**	Outside Back	14 July 1985 (age 31)
Manasa Mataele	Outside Back	27 November 1996 (age 20)

=== Highlanders ===
Player	Position	Date of birth (age)
**Liam Coltman**	Hooker	25 January 1990 (age 27)
Adrian Smith	Hooker	27 April 1987 (age 29)
Daniel Lienert-Brown	Prop	9 February 1993 (age 23)
Craig Millar	Prop	29 October 1990 (age 26)
Aki Seiuli	Prop	22 December 1992 (age 24)
Josh Dickson	Lock	2 November 1994 (age 22)
Tom Franklin	Lock	1 August 1990 (age 26)
Jackson Hemopo	Lock	14 November 1993 (age 23)
Gareth Evans	Loose forward	5 August 1991 (age 25)
Dillon Hunt	Loose forward	DOB unknown (age 21)
James Lentjes	Loose forward	16 January 1991 (age 26)
**Luke Whitelock**	Loose forward	29 January 1991 (age 26)
Kayne Hammington	Halfback	24 September 1990 (age 26)
Josh Renton	Halfback	25 May 1994 (age 22)
Marty Banks	First Five-Eighth	19 September 1989 (age 27)
Fletcher Smith	First Five-Eighth	1 March 1995 (age 21)
Jason Emery	Midfielder	21 September 1993 (age 23)
Rob Thompson	Midfielder	29 August 1991 (age 25)
Sio Tomkinson	Midfielder	27 May 1996 (age 20)
Tei Walden	Midfielder	25 May 1993 (age 23)
Matt Faddes	Outside Back	6 November 1991 (age 25)
Tevita Li	Outside Back	23 March 1995 (age 21)

=== Melbourne Rebels ===
Player	Position	Date of birth (age)
**James Hanson**	Hooker	15 September 1988 (age 28)
Pat Leafa	Hooker	16 March 1989 (age 27)
Cruze Ah-Nau	Prop	10 August 1990 (age 26)
Tyrel Lomax	Prop	1 June 1996 (age 20)
**Toby Smith**	Prop	10 October 1988 (age 28)
**Laurie Weeks**	Prop	5 April 1986 (age 30)
Steve Cummins	Lock	29 March 1992 (age 24)
Culum Retallick	Lock	8 May 1985 (age 31)
**Lopeti Timani**	Lock	28 September 1990 (age 26)
Murray Douglas	Loose forward	27 October 1989 (age 27)
Colby Fainga'a	Loose forward	31 March 1991 (age 25)
**Amanaki Mafi**	Loose forward	January 21, 1990 (age 27)
Jordy Reid	Loose forward	3 October 1991 (age 25)
Ben Meehan	Halfback	21 January 1993 (age 24)
Nic Stirzaker	Halfback	8 March 1991 (age 25)
Jack Debreczeni	First Five-Eighth	6 June 1993 (age 23)
Jackson Garden-Bachop	First Five-Eighth	3 October 1994 (age 22)
**Ben Volavola**	First Five-Eighth	13 January 1991 (age 26)
**Reece Hodge**	Midfielder	26 August 1994 (age 22)
Mitch Inman	Midfielder	24 October 1988 (age 28)
Sione Tuipulotu	Midfielder	12 February 1997 (age 19)
**Morgan Turinui**	Midfielder	5 January 1982 (age 35)
Tom English	Outside Back	8 March 1991 (age 25)
Marika Koroibete	Outside Back	26 July 1992 (age 24)
Jack Maddocks	Outside Back	5 February 1997 (age 19)
**Sefa Naivalu**	Outside Back	7 January 1992 (age 25)

=== Reds ===
Player	Position	Date of birth (age)
Alex Mafi	Hooker	7 November 1996 (age 20)
Andrew Ready	Hooker	11 July 1993 (age 23)
Sef Fa'agase	Prop	3 May 1991 (age 25)
**James Slipper**	Prop	6 June 1989 (age 27)
Sam Talakai	Prop	4 September 1991 (age 25)
Taniela Tupou	Prop	10 May 1996 (age 20)
Cadeyrn Neville	Lock	9 November 1988 (age 28)
Izack Rodda	Lock	20 August 1996 (age 20)
**Rob Simmons**	Lock	19 April 1989 (age 27)
Lukhan Tui	Lock	19 September 1996 (age 20)
Michael Gunn	Loose forward	16 June 1995 (age 21)
**Leroy Houston**	Loose forward	10 November 1986 (age 30)
Adam Korczyk	Loose forward	14 February 1995 (age 21)
Moses Sorovoi	Halfback	15 January 1996 (age 21)
James Tuttle	Halfback	13 May 1996 (age 20)
Jake McIntyre	First Five-Eighth	28 April 1994 (age 22)
**Samu Kerevi**	Midfielder	27 September 1993 (age 23)
Duncan Paia'aua	Midfielder	20 January 1995 (age 22)
Henry Taefu	Midfielder	2 April 1993 (age 23)
Karmichael Hunt	Outside Back	17 November 1986 (age 30)
Chris Kuridrani	Outside Back	12 December 1991 (age 25)
Brad Lacey	Outside Back	11 April 1994 (age 22)
**Chris Latham**	Outside Back	8 September 1975 (age 41)
Lachlan Maranta	Outside Back	17 April 1992 (age 24)
Eto Nabuli	Outside Back	24 August 1988 (age 28)
Jayden Ngamanu	Outside Back	28 August 1997 (age 19)

=== Waratahs ===
Player	Position	Date of birth (age)
Damien Fitzpatrick	Hooker	8 June 1989 (age 27)
Tolu Latu	Hooker	23 February 1993 (age 23)
Hugh Roach	Hooker	11 September 1992 (age 24)
Rory O'Connor	Prop	11 May 1994 (age 22)
**Tom Robertson**	Prop	28 August 1994 (age 22)
Ned Hanigan	Lock	11 April 1995 (age 21)
Ryan McCauley	Lock	8 June 1997 (age 19)
Pat McCutcheon	Loose forward	24 June 1987 (age 29)
Jamason Schultz	Loose forward	DOB unknown (age 20)
Michael Wells	Loose forward	3 May 1993 (age 23)
Brad Wilkin	Loose forward	8 December 1995 (age 21)
Jake Gordon	Halfback	6 July 1993 (age 23)
Matt Lucas	Halfback	29 January 1992 (age 25)
Andrew Deegan	First Five-Eighth	23 March 1995 (age 20)
Bryce Hegarty	First Five-Eighth	28 August 1992 (age 24)
David Horwitz	First Five-Eighth	30 September 1994 (age 22)
Mack Mason	First Five-Eighth	19 January 1996 (age 20)
Con Foley	Midfielder	19 September 1992 (age 24)
**Rob Horne**	Midfielder	15 August 1989 (age 27)
Cam Clark	Outside Back	20 March 1993 (age 23)
**Israel Folau**	Outside Back	3 April 1989 (age 27)
Harry Jones	Outside Back	17 November 1995 (age 21)
Andrew Kellaway	Outside Back	12 October 1995 (age 21)
**Taqele Naiyaravoro**	Outside Back	7 December 1991 (age 25)
Reece Robinson	Outside Back	13 June 1987 (age 29)
**Lote Tuqiri**	Outside Back	23 September 1979 (age 37)

== Tournament matches ==
=== Pool A ===
Team	Pld	W	D	L	PF	PA	+/-	TF	TA	Pts
(New Zealand) Chiefs	3	2	0	1	64	38	+26	10	6	7
(Japan) Panasonic Wild Knights	3	2	0	1	37	50	–13	7	7	7
(Australia) Rebels	3	1	0	2	43	36	+7	7	6	5
(Australia) Waratahs	3	1	0	2	33	53	–20	5	8	5

11 February 2017	Rebels	19–5	Chiefs	Suncorp Stadium, Brisbane
12:00 AEDST

11 February 2017	Panasonic Wild Knights	15–5	Waratahs	Suncorp Stadium, Brisbane
12:28 AEDST

11 February 2017	Rebels	12–17	Panasonic Wild Knights	Suncorp Stadium, Brisbane
15:33 AEDST

11 February 2017	Chiefs	26–14	Waratahs	Suncorp Stadium, Brisbane
16:33 AEDST

12 February 2017	Rebels	12–14	Waratahs	Suncorp Stadium, Brisbane
10:00 AEDST

12 February 2017	Chiefs	33–5	Panasonic Wild Knights	Suncorp Stadium, Brisbane
10:27 AEDST

=== Pool B ===
Team	Pld	W	D	L	PF	PA	+/-	TF	TA	Pts
(New Zealand) Crusaders	3	3	0	0	57	19	+38	12	3	9
(Australia) Reds	3	1	1	1	29	50	–21	2	8	6
Samoa	3	1	0	2	39	38	+1	6	6	5
(New Zealand) Blues	3	0	1	2	43	61	–18	7	10	4

11 February 2017	Reds	17–17	Blues	Suncorp Stadium, Brisbane
12:56 AEDST

11 February 2017	Manu Samoa	7–12	Crusaders	Suncorp Stadium, Brisbane
14:30 AEDST

11 February 2017	Reds	0–28	Crusaders	Suncorp Stadium, Brisbane
18:00 AEDST

11 February 2017	Blues	14–27	Manu Samoa	Suncorp Stadium, Brisbane
18:28 AEDST

12 February 2017	Reds	12–5	Manu Samoa	Suncorp Stadium, Brisbane
10:54 AEDST

12 February 2017	Blues	12–17	Crusaders	Suncorp Stadium, Brisbane
11:22 AEDST

=== Pool C ===
Team	Pld	W	D	L	PF	PA	+/-	TF	TA	Pts
(South Africa) Blue Bulls	3	2	0	1	45	34	+11	7	6	7
(New Zealand) Highlanders	3	2	1	0	44	38	+6	7	6	7
(Australia) Brumbies	3	2	0	1	24	19	+5	3	4	7

11 February 2017	Brumbies	7–14	Highlanders	Suncorp Stadium, Brisbane
13:57 AEDST

11 February 2017	Brumbies	7–5	Blue Bulls	Suncorp Stadium, Brisbane
19:28 AEDST

12 February 2017	Highlanders	17–26	Blue Bulls	Suncorp Stadium, Brisbane
12:17 AEDST

=== Pool D ===
Team	Pld	W	D	L	PF	PA	+/-	TF	TA	Pts
(New Zealand) Hurricanes	3	2	0	1	56	25	+31	10	4	7
(Australia) Force	3	1	0	2	29	38	–9	5	5	5
(France) Toulon	3	0	0	3	5	49	–44	1	9	3

11 February 2017	Force	12–19	Hurricanes	Suncorp Stadium, Brisbane
16:01 AEDST

11 February 2017	Force	7–5	Toulon	Suncorp Stadium, Brisbane
19:56 AEDST

12 February 2017	Hurricanes	32–0	Toulon	Suncorp Stadium, Brisbane
11:50 AEDST

=== Pool C/D cross-over matches ===
In order to complete the same number of pool matches as the teams in Pools A and B, teams in Pool C and D faced one team from the other pool in a cross-over match as their third pool match of the tournament. In these cross-over matches, the Blue Bulls faced the Western Force, the Brumbies played Toulon, and the Highlanders competed against the Hurricanes.

11 February 2017	Blue Bulls	14–10	Force	Suncorp Stadium, Brisbane
13:29 AEDST

11 February 2017	Brumbies	10–0	Toulon	Suncorp Stadium, Brisbane
17:01 AEDST

11 February 2017	Highlanders	13–5	Hurricanes	Suncorp Stadium, Brisbane
19:00 AEDST

== Finals ==
The top eight teams from day 1 progressed to the quarter-finals on day 2.

Quarter-finals
1A	(New Zealand) Chiefs	12
2B	(Australia) Reds	10
1C	(South Africa) Blue Bulls	19
2D	(Australia) Force	12
1B	(New Zealand) Crusaders	12
2A	(Japan) Panasonic Wild Knights	7
1D	(New Zealand) Hurricanes	7
2C	(New Zealand) Highlanders	5

Semi-finals
Q1	(New Zealand) Chiefs	26
Q3	(South Africa) Blue Bulls	14
Q2	(New Zealand) Crusaders	17
Q4	(New Zealand) Hurricanes	7

Final
S1	(New Zealand) Chiefs	12
S2	(New Zealand) Crusaders	5

=== Quarter finals ===
12 February 2017	(New Zealand) Chiefs	12–10	(Australia) Reds	Suncorp Stadium, Brisbane
12:48 AEDST

12 February 2017	(New Zealand) Crusaders	12–7	(Japan) Panasonic Wild Knights	Suncorp Stadium, Brisbane
13:22 AEDST

12 February 2017	(South Africa) Blue Bulls	19–12	(Australia) Force	Suncorp Stadium, Brisbane
13:56 AEDST

12 February 2017	(New Zealand) Hurricanes	7–5	(New Zealand) Highlanders	Suncorp Stadium, Brisbane
14:30 AEDST

=== Semi-finals ===
12 February 2017	(New Zealand) Chiefs	26–14	(South Africa) Blue Bulls	Suncorp Stadium, Brisbane
15:31 AEDST

12 February 2017	(New Zealand) Crusaders	17–7	(New Zealand) Hurricanes	Suncorp Stadium, Brisbane
15:57 AEDST

=== Final ===
12 February 2017	(New Zealand) Chiefs	12–5	(New Zealand) Crusaders	Suncorp Stadium, Brisbane
17:40 AEDST
