= Scott Fuglistaller =

NZ rugby union player

- Full name: Scott Anthony Hans Fuglistaller
- Born: 16 April 1987 (age 39) Hawera, New Zealand
- Height: 183 cm (6 ft 0 in)
- Weight: 87 kg (192 lb; 13 st 10 lb)
- School: Francis Douglas Memorial College

Rugby union career
- Position(s): Flanker, Number 8
Senior career
Years	Team	Apps	(Points)
2008–2012	Wellington	59	(50)
2012	Highlanders	2	(0)
2013–2016	Rebels	50	(15)
2015	Melbourne Rising	5	(5)
2016–2020	Toyota Industries Shuttles	26	(20)
- Correct as of 2 September 2021
International career
Years	Team	Apps	(Points)
2006	New Zealand U19	5	(10)
2012	South Island	1	(0)
- Correct as of 2 September 2021

Scott Anthony Hans Fuglistaller (born 16 April 1987) is a New Zealand rugby union professional footballer. He plays for, and captains, the Melbourne Rebels in Super Rugby and the Melbourne Rising in the National Rugby Championship. His regular playing position is openside flanker.

== Early career ==
He played first XV rugby for Francis Douglas Memorial College in New Plymouth, and club rugby in Wellington.

== Super Rugby ==
In New Zealand, Fuglistaller represented the Highlanders and made his debut in 2012.

In 2011 and 2012, Fuglistaller did not play. Like many, he viewed the Rebels defence as lacking. However, in 2013 he was among the squad's fit young recruits expected to bring a hard edge to the Rebels defence and attack.

His rivals for the openside flank were rugby league convert Jarrod Saffy and Rebels newcomer Jordy Reid.

In the opening round of the 2013 Super Rugby season, Fuglistaller made his Rebels debut against the Western Force, and played for 64 minutes before being replaced by Saffy. He was named to play against the ACT Brumbies the following week, and expected to face strong competition from Wallabies flanker David Pocock.

In 2014, despite competition for the open side flanker position from Reid and Australian Sevens rep Sean McMahon the Rebels extended Fuglistaller's contract through until the end of the 2016 Super Rugby season.

On 6 February 2015 Fuglistaller was appointed co-captain of the Rebels alongside incumbent captain Scott Higginbotham.

On 7 August 2015, Fuglistaller and his Rebels teammate Colby Fainga'a were appointed co-captains of the Melbourne Rising for the 2015 National Rugby Championship season.

== Super Rugby statistics ==
As of 21 July 2016

Season	Team	Games	Starts	Sub	Mins	Tries	Cons	Pens	Drops	Points	Yel	Red
2012	Highlanders	2	0	2	28	0	0	0	0	0	0	0
2013	Rebels	16	15	1	1010	1	0	0	0	5	0	0
2014	Rebels	15	14	1	891	2	0	0	0	10	2	0
2015	Rebels	13	7	6	457	0	0	0	0	0	0	0
2016	Rebels	6	0	6	98	0	0	0	0	0	1	0
Total		52	36	16	2484	3	0	0	0	15	3	0
