= Tuimalealiʻifano (name) =

Tuimalealiʻifano or Tuimalealiifano is a chiefly title of Samoa. It is also both a given name and a surname. Notable people with the surname include:

- Tuimalealiʻifano Vaʻaletoʻa Sualauvi II (born 1947), Samoan politician
- Ah-mu Tuimalealiifano (born 1996), Samoan-born Australian rugby union player
- Maureen Tuimalealiifano (born 1970), Samoan archer
- Sukhia Tuimalealiʻifano Go, Fijian businesswoman
