= Jarrod Saffy =

South African rugby union & league footballer

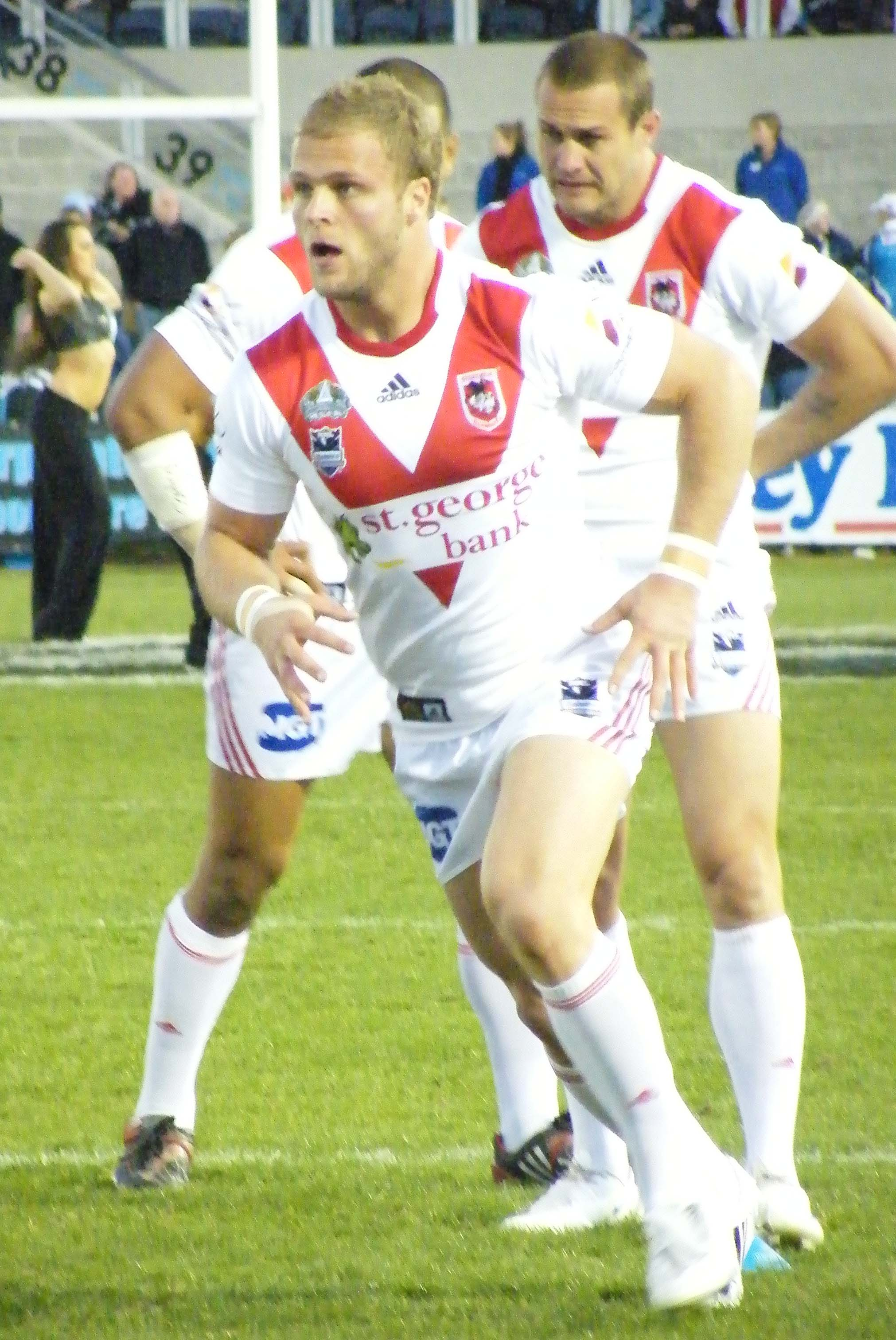
- Saffy playing with the Dragons in 2008

Personal information
- Born: 24 October 1984 (age 42) Johannesburg, South Africa
- Height: 191 cm (6 ft 3 in)
- Weight: 106 kg (16 st 10 lb)

Playing information

Rugby league
- Position: Second-row, Prop
Club
Years	Team	Pld	T	G	FG	P
2006–07	Wests Tigers	8	0	0	0	0
2008–10	St. George Illawarra	53	1	0	0	4
	Total	61	1	0	0	4

Rugby union
- Position: Flanker, Number 8
Club
Years	Team	Pld	T	G	FG	P
2011–13	Melbourne Rebels	35	2	0	0	10
2013–	US Bressane	0	0	0	0	0
	Total	35	2	0	0	10
- Source: As of 31 October 2019

Jarrod Saffy (born 24 October 1984) is a rugby union player. He played rugby league for the Wests Tigers and St George Illawarra Dragons in the NRL before switching to rugby union with the Melbourne Rebels for the 2011 Super Rugby season.

== Background ==
He was born in Johannesburg, South Africa.

== Early career ==
Saffy moved to Australia as a 15-year-old and continued playing rugby union at St Joseph's, Hunters Hill. He represented the Australian Schoolboys, Australian under 21s and the Australian Sevens in rugby union as well as spending some time playing for the NSW Waratahs Academy and Sydney University Football Club.

As he has played sevens for Australia he is tied to them in Rugby Union.

== Rugby League ==
Saffy switched to rugby league to progress faster and made his debut in first grade in rugby league in the final round 26 match of 2006 for the Wests Tigers. He made seven first grade appearances for the Tigers in 2007. Saffy played rugby league at second-row and also at prop-forward.

He played in St George's 2010 NRL Grand Final-winning team, and thus became the second South African-born player to win a premiership.

He was eligible to represent Lebanon as well as his native South Africa and he was also eligible to represent Australia in Rugby League.

== Rugby Union ==
In April 2010, Saffy became the first NRL player to sign with the Melbourne Rebels Super Rugby franchise. In October he commenced training with the Rebels for the new team's in the 2011 Super Rugby debut. He was expected to play at either blindside flanker or No. 8.

In May 2011, Saffy was named in the Rebels squad to travel to Pretoria and Bloemfontein for the Rebels' "challenging double-header" against the Bulls and Cheetahs.

In 2013 Saffy trained to be the Rebels first choice openside flanker, in competition with newcomers Scott Fuglistaller and Jordy Reid.

Saffy signed with French club US Bressane in November 2013.
