= Jordan Uelese =

Australia international rugby union player

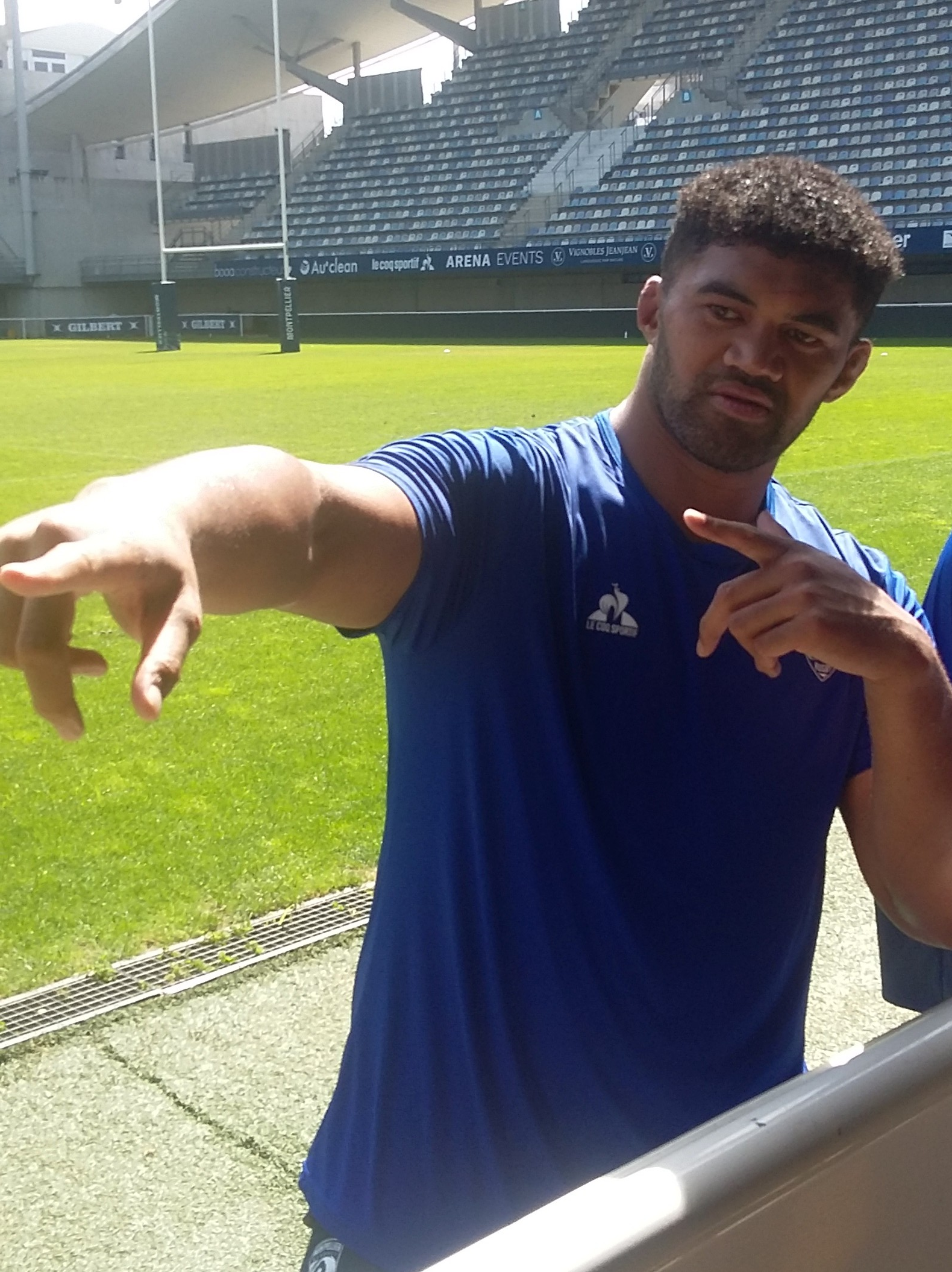
- Born: Jordan Uelese; 24 January 1997 (age 29) Wellington, New Zealand
- Height: 1.89 m (6 ft 2 in)
- Weight: 116 kg (18 st 4 lb)
- School: St. Kevin's College, Melbourne

Rugby union career
- Position: Hooker
- Current team: Montpellier
Senior career
Years	Team	Apps	(Points)
2015–2019	Melbourne Rising	4	(0)
2024–	Montpellier	36	(70)
- Correct as of 18 April 2026
Super Rugby
Years	Team	Apps	(Points)
2017−2024	Rebels	72	(50)
- Correct as of 8 June 2024
International career
Years	Team	Apps	(Points)
2016–2017	Australia U20s	12	(9)
2017–	Australia	19	(10)
- Correct as of 18 April 2026

Jordan Uelese (born 24 January 1997) is an Australian professional rugby union player for Montpellier Hérault Rugby in Top 14, having previously played for the Melbourne Rebels in Super Rugby. He has been capped for the Australian national team. His usual position is hooker.

== Early life ==
Uelese is of Samoan descent and was born in Wellington in New Zealand, where he started playing rugby for the Oriental Rongotai Club. He moved with his family to Melbourne in Australia at the age of eleven and lived in the suburb of South Morang. He attended Marymede Catholic College in South Morang, before moving in 2011 to St. Kevin's College in Toorak on a rugby scholarship. As a teenager he was a loose forward before switching to hooker, the position he played for the Rebels Under-20 side in the National Championships.

== Career ==
Uelese was selected for the Australia Under 20 team two years in a row, playing at the World Rugby Championships in Manchester in 2016 and then in Georgia in 2017. Uelese made his Super Rugby debut in the opening round of the 2017 season against the Blues as a replacement for Patrick Leafa in a defeat for the Rebels, becoming the third 'home-grown' player for the Rebels. In September 2017 he made his international debut for Australia against the Springboks in a 23–23 draw at nib Stadium in Perth.

== Super Rugby statistics ==
As of 3 June 2023

Season	Team	Games	Starts	Sub	Mins	Tries	Cons	Pens	Drops	Points	Yel	Red
2017	Rebels	3	0	3	27	0	0	0	0	0	0	0
2018	Rebels	8	3	5	303	0	0	0	0	0	1	0
2019	Rebels	3	1	2	100	1	0	0	0	5	0	0
2020	Rebels	2	0	2	38	0	0	0	0	0	0	0
2020 AU	Rebels	9	9	0	580	3	0	0	0	15	0	0
2021 AU	Rebels	6	3	3	256	1	0	0	0	5	0	0
2021 TT	Rebels	5	5	0	297	0	0	0	0	0	1	0
2022	Rebels	9	9	0	492	3	0	0	0	15	0	0
2023	Rebels	12	3	9	400	0	0	0	0	0	2	0
Total		57	33	24	2,467	8	0	0	0	40	4	0
