= Semisi Tupou =

Australian rugby union player

- Born: 29 April 1999 (age 27) Brisbane, Queensland, Australia
- Height: 1.90 m (6 ft 3 in)
- Weight: 98 kg (15 st 6 lb)
- School: St Joseph's College, Nudgee

Rugby union career
- Position(s): Centre, Wing
Senior career
Years	Team	Apps	(Points)
2017–2019	Melbourne Rising	10	(32)
2021–2023	Panasonic Wild Knights	23	(35)
2023-2025	Ricoh Black Rams	23	(20)
2025–	Toyota Verblitz	1	(0)
- Correct as of 1 June 2022
Super Rugby
Years	Team	Apps	(Points)
2017–2020	Rebels	9	(5)
- Correct as of 29 September 2020
International career
Years	Team	Apps	(Points)
2016	Australia Schoolboys	0	
2017	Australia U20	7	
Medal record
Men's rugby union
Representing Australia
Oceania U20 Championship
Winner	2019 Gold Coast
Junior World Cup
Runner-up	2019 Argentina

Semisi Tupou (born 29 April 1999) is an Australian rugby union player who plays for the Ricoh Black Rams in Japan Rugby League One. His position of choice is centre.

== Career ==
He made his debut for the Rebels against the Jaguares as a replacement for Jack Maddocks in a 29–32 defeat for the Rebels.

== Super Rugby statistics ==
As of 12 September 2020

Season	Team	Games	Starts	Sub	Mins	Tries	Cons	Pens	Drops	Points	Yel	Red
2017	Rebels	1	0	1	3	0	0	0	0	0	0	0
2018	Rebels	5	1	4	125	1	0	0	0	5	0	0
2019	Rebels	3	1	2	111	0	0	0	0	0	1	0
2020	Rebels	0	0	0	0	0	0	0	0	0	0	0
2020 AU	Rebels	0	0	0	0	0	0	0	0	0	0	0
Total		9	2	7	239	1	0	0	0	5	1	0
