= Tupai (surname) =

Tupai is a surname. Notable people with the surname include:

- Connor Tupai (born 1999), New Zealand-born rugby union player
- Ikapote Tupai (born 1996), New Zealand born, Australian rugby union player
