= Lloyd Johansson =

Australia international rugby union player (born 1985)

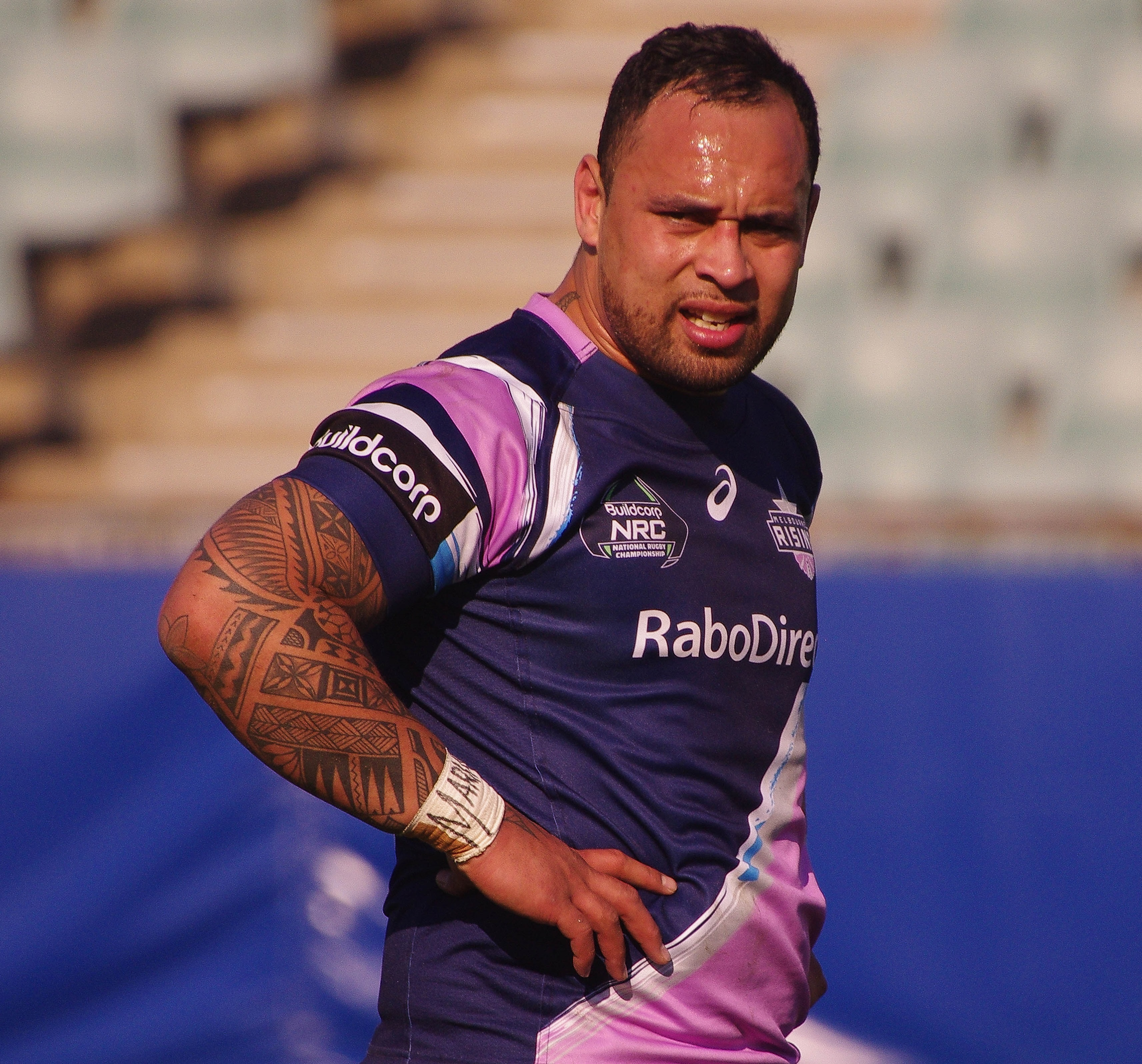
- Johansson in 2014
- Born: Lloyd Johansson; 2 May 1985 (age 41) Melbourne, Victoria, Australia
- Height: 1.81 m (5 ft 11 1/2 in)
- Weight: 108 kg (17 st 0 lb)
- School: The Southport School

Rugby union career
- Position: Centre
- Current team: Melbourne Harlequin
Senior career
Years	Team	Apps	(Points)
2007	East Coast Aces	3	(0)
2008–10	Viadana	34	(32)
2010–11	Honda Heat		
2014–	Melbourne Rising	22	(19)
- Correct as of 3 November 2015
Super Rugby
Years	Team	Apps	(Points)
2005–08	Reds	19	(5)
2012	Rebels	7	(5)
- Correct as of 1 June 2012
International career
Years	Team	Apps	(Points)
2005	Australia	3	(5)

Lloyd Johansson (born 5 February 1985) is an Australian rugby union professional player of Tongan and Swedish descent. He plays for the Melbourne Rising in the National Rugby Championship, and his usual position is centre.

== Early life ==
Lloyd Johansson was born in Melbourne, Australia to Lloyd 'Loiti' Johansson Snr and Maria ' Malia' Johansson. He played under-14 and under-16 rugby for Victoria before moving to Queensland in 2002 to complete his schooling. He was selected for the Australian Schoolboys rugby union team and also represented Australia at Under 19 and 21 levels.

== Career ==
An inside centre, Johannsson is noted for his hard-running and exceptional defence. He played for the Queensland Reds and captained the East Coast Aces in the now defunct Australian Rugby Championship. He made his Wallabies debut in 2005 against the All Blacks.

Johansson had a challenging Super Rugby season in 2007. He did not see any Super 14 action during the 2008 season and was not offered a contract with the Queensland Reds for 2009. He joined Italian club MPS Viadana in an effort to reignite his career, followed by a stint in 2011 with Japanese club Honda Heat.

In 2012 Johansson become the first Victorian player to earn a Super Rugby contract with the Melbourne Rebels. After playing for Melbourne Harlequin in the Dewar Shield in 2013 and 2014, he was named in the Melbourne Rising squad for the National Rugby Championship inaugural season of 2014.
