= Pom Simona =

Australian rugby union coach

- Born: 21 July 1979 (age 47) Australia

Rugby union career
- Position: Head coach
- Current team: Melbourne Rising
Senior career
Years	Team	Apps	(Points)
2014–2015	Melbourne Rising	14	(0)
Coaching career
- Years: Team
- 2015–: Melbourne Harlequins
- 2018: Melbourne Rising (assistant coach)
- 2019: Melbourne Rising
- 2022–: Melbourne Rebels (Elite Pathways coach)

Pom Simona (born 21 July 1979) is an Australian professional rugby union football coach. He is currently the head coach of the Melbourne Rising team that plays in the NRC competition, and also head coach of the Melbourne Harlequins. Simona had previously represented the Rising team in the 2014 and 2015 additions of the NRC.
