= Melbourne Rising =

Australian rugby union club, based in Melbourne

(Australia) Melbourne Rising
- Founded: 2007 Melbourne Rebels (ARC); 2014 Melbourne Rising (NRC)
- Disbanded: 2020; 6 years ago (competition disbanded)
- Location: Melbourne, Australia
- Grounds: Bailey Reserve, Adelaide (Cap: 3,000); Eureka Stadium, Ballarat (Cap: 11,000); Casey Fields, Casey (Cap: 12,000); Sparks Reserve, Box Hill (Cap: 3,000)
- Coach: Pom Simona
- Captain: Semisi Tupou
- League: National Rugby Championship
- 2019: 7th
Team kit

The Melbourne Rising was an Australian rugby union team based in Melbourne that competed in the National Rugby Championship (NRC). The team represented the rugby community in Victoria and was organised and managed by Rugby Victoria with the coaching and training programs used by the Melbourne Rebels being extended to players joining the team from the Rebels, the local Dewar Shield competition, and local Victorian juniors.

The NRC was launched in 2014, reinstating the national competition after an absence of six years. The previous competition was the Australian Rugby Championship (ARC), which was discontinued in 2007 after only one season. The team representing Victoria in the ARC was the Melbourne Rebels, organised and managed by the VRU. That Rebels team was the predecessor of the Melbourne Rebels team in Super Rugby and the Melbourne Rising team in the NRC.

== History ==
In 2004, a consortium led by the Victorian Rugby Union entered the bidding process for a licence in the Super 14 competition to get a team in Melbourne for the 2006 season. The then Super 12 competition was expanding to 14 teams, with one new licence being allocated to an Australian team and another to a South African team. Victoria and Western Australia were the leading bidders for the Australian team and the licence was eventually allocated to Western Australia, creating the Western Force.

For the Australian Rugby Championship in 2007, however, both Victoria and Western Australia were allocated teams. The Australian Rugby Union announced the new, eight-team national competition after setting up a consultative process in 2006 which culminated in a working session of some 70 delegates from around the country. It was reported that New South Wales gave up a fourth team to enable Victoria to participate in the new national competition.

=== Melbourne Rebels (ARC team) ===
The Melbourne Rebels team was formed to participate in the Australian Rugby Championship (ARC) that started in August 2007. It was the only team in the ARC that was not directly linked to a Super Rugby franchise as Victoria did not have one at the time.

The Rebels' jersey had traditional navy blue and white hoops, the colours of the Victorian Axemen side that represented Victoria in the Australian Rugby Shield. The Rebels name was chosen in consultation with the local rugby community. VRU officials decided on the name in reference to Victoria's first Wallaby, Sir Edward "Weary" Dunlop. At the official launch of the team's name and jersey on 29 March 2007, former Wallaby Chris “Buddha” Handy said:

Like the great Weary Dunlop, Victorian rugby has a history of daring to be different, a touch of the larrikin, and always having a go. These qualities are what you want in a Rebel and characterize the way Victoria is successfully tackling this historic year.

— Chris Handy, at the VRU’s Weary Dunlop Rugby lunch at Crown’s Palladium, 2007.

The Rebels' head coach for the ARC was Bill Millard, a former coach of the Australian Sevens and Sydney University. Former Wallaby Fletcher Dyson was a coaching consultant. Former Rugby World Cup-winning coach Rod Macqueen was the No. 1 ticket holder and a passionate supporter of the club. The Melbourne side was allowed to sign a number of players from the four Australian Super 14 franchises. This included three players from the Brumbies and Western Force, and one each from the New South Wales Waratahs and Queensland Reds. David Croft was the 2007 captain.

The Melbourne Rebels played their ARC home games at the Olympic Park Stadium located in inner Melbourne, but the team's first league game was an away win against the Canberra team in round one. The Melbourne Rebels played their first home match in front of 4,875 people at Olympic Park the following week, beating the East Coast Aces.

After finishing fourth on the league table, the Rebels defeated the minor premiers Western Sydney in their semi-final 23 to 3. The Rebels played the Central Coast Rays in the inaugural ARC Grand Final. The Melbourne team was defeated by the Central Coast 20 points to 12 in the Grand Final, finishing runners-up in the competition.

The Australian Rugby Championship was terminated at the end of 2007 after only one season of competition, with the Australian Rugby Union citing higher costs than budgeted and further projected financial losses. The Melbourne Rebels side was disbanded with the end of the ARC, but was revived in 2010 under the same name as the Super 14 tournament was expanded to the 15-team Super Rugby competition to include the Melbourne Rebels for the 2011 season.

=== National Rugby Championship ===
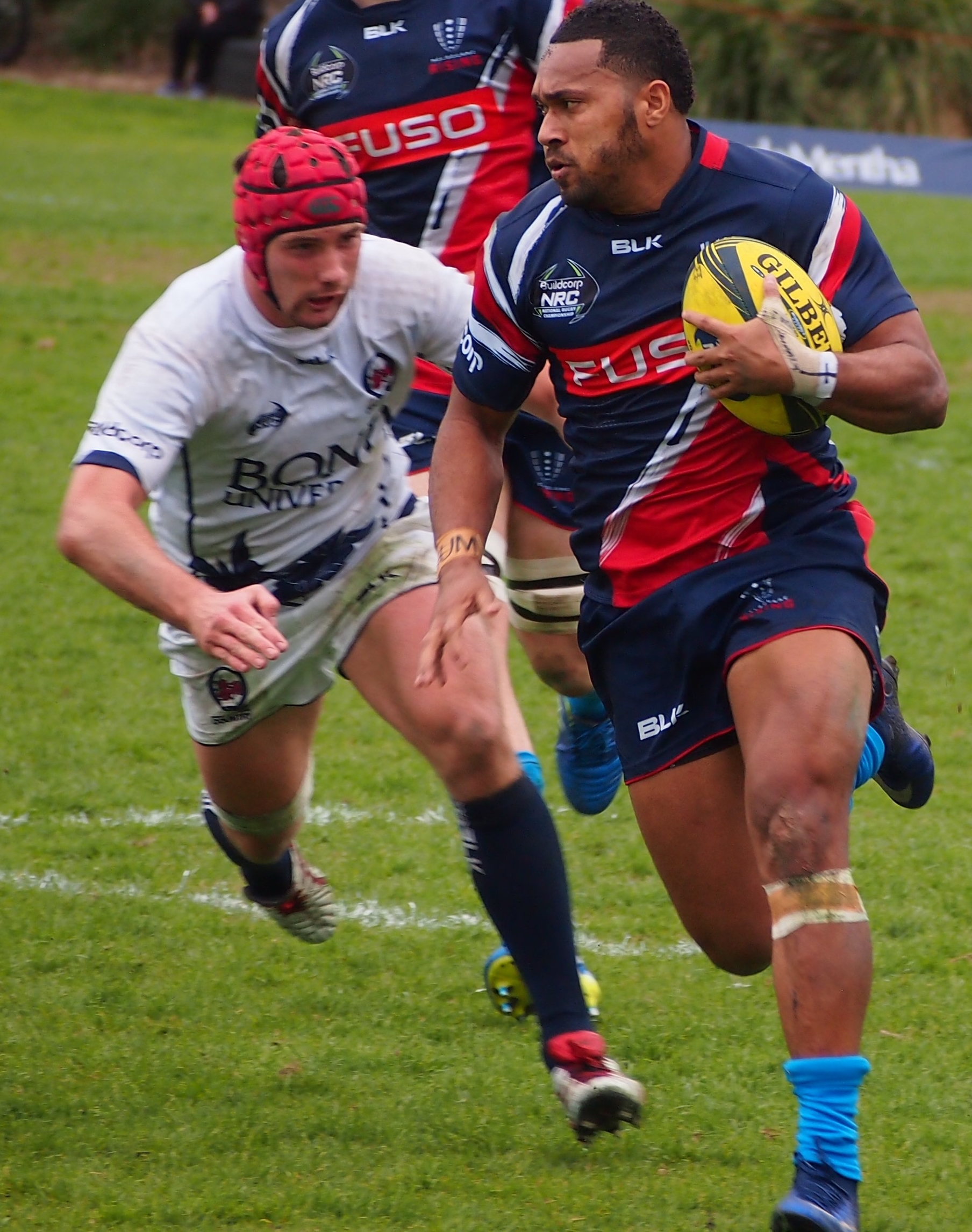
Sefa Naivalu playing for the Rising in 2016

In December 2013, the ARU announced that the national competition was to be relaunched, with the National Rugby Championship (NRC) commencing in 2014. Expressions of interest were open to any interested bidders, with the accepted tenders finalised in early 2014. On 24 March 2014, it was announced that the Melbourne Rising would play in the NRC competition.

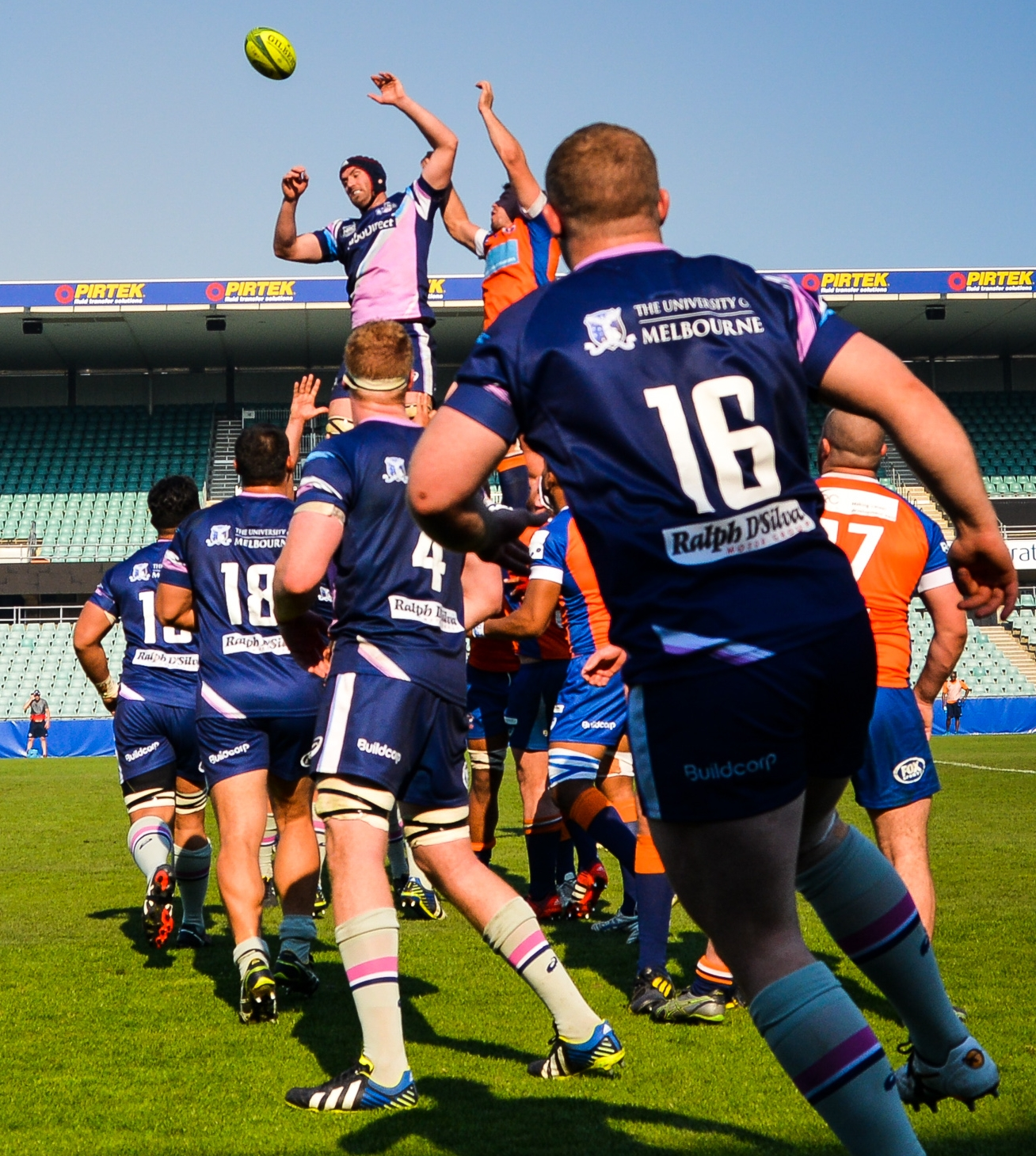
Rising lineout win against Rams in 2014

The Rising's jersey for the 2014 season was predominantly navy blue and pink, with white and electric blue highlights. The team's logo incorporated a rising star, representing future talent; a floral arrangement of Pink Heath, which is the state flower of Victoria; and the five stars representing the Melbourne Rebels.

For the 2014 NRC season, the Melbourne Rising secured RaboDirect as the main jersey sponsor. Sean Hedger and Matt Cockbain were appointed as head coach and forwards coach of the Rising. Both were assistant coaches at the Rebels. Craig McGrath, coach of the Melbourne Harlequin club, was appointed as backs coach. The Rising's training base is also at the Harlequin club in Ashwood. Nic Stirzaker was named as captain with Mitch Inman, Patrick Leafa and Pom Simona in the team's leadership group. Scrumhalf Luke Burgess played for both the Melbourne Rebels ARC team in 2007 and the Melbourne Rising NRC team in 2014.

== Colours and logo ==
As of 2016, Melbourne Rising's colours of red, white and blue were those of the Melbourne Rebels, although the side previously played in a navy blue and pink jersey, with white and electric blue highlights. The team's current logo is also adapted from that of the parent franchise, with the name Melbourne Rising used instead of Melbourne Rebels.

2007 Melbourne Rebels ARC kit and logo

2014 Melbourne Rising kit and logo

== Home grounds ==
The team scheduled its 2019 home matches at the following locations:

City	Venue	Capacity
Adelaide	Bailey Reserve	3,000
Ballarat	Eureka Stadium	11,000
Box Hill	RHL Sparks Reserve	3,000
Cranbourne East	Casey Fields	12,000

Other home venues used in previous seasons:

City	Venue	Capacity
Ashwood	Ashwood Reserve	3,000
Ballarat	St Patrick's College	3,000
Frankston	Frankston Park	8,000
Geelong	GMHBA Stadium	34,074
Melbourne	AAMI Park	29,500
Morwell	Latrobe City Stadium	4,000

For the Rising's initial season, the team played at AAMI Park, located in inner Melbourne. Opened in 2010, the stadium's major tenants include the Melbourne Rebels, Melbourne Storm, Melbourne Victory and Melbourne City FC. Smaller venues were preferred from 2016 onward.

== Current squad ==
The squad for the 2019 NRC season:

Melbourne Rising squad – NRC 2019 (Note: Squad was named on 14 August.)
Prop: (Australia) **Jermaine Ainsley**; (Australia) Angus Arundel; (Tonga) Pone Fa'amausili; (Australia) **Tetera Faulkner**; (Australia) Matt Gibbon; (Australia) Noa Noa; (Australia) Fereti Sa'aga; (New Zealand) Junior Uelese; Hooker: (New Zealand) Anaru Rangi; (New Zealand) JP Sauni; (Australia) Moli Sooaemalelagi; (Australia) Mahe Vailanu; Lock: (Australia) Will Clift; (Australia) Esei Ha'angana; (Australia) Trevor Hosea; (Australia) **Matt Philip**; Backrow: (Australia) Angus Cottrell; (Australia) **Richard Hardwick**; (Australia) Ross Haylett-Petty; (Australia) **Luke Jones** (Note: Jones was not named in the original squad, but was named in the team for Round 4.); (Australia) Boyd Killingworth; (Australia) Rob Leota; (Australia) Pat Morrey; (Fiji) Maciu Nabolakasi (Note: Nabolakasi was not named in the original squad, but was named in the team for Round 1.); (Australia) George Noa; (Australia) Katinali Tai; (Fiji) Joseva Tamani; (Australia) Ola Tauelangi; (Tonga) Ikapote Tupai	Scrum-half: (New Zealand) Reece Fuller; (Australia) Delai Moto; (Australia) Theo Strang; Fly-half: (Australia) Navarre Haisila; (Australia) Michael Moloney; (Samoa) **James So'oialo**; Centre: (Samoa) **Rodney Iona**; (Australia) **Lloyd Johansson**; (Fiji) William Lewesi; (Australia) Harry Potter; Wing: (Ireland) Taylor Acheson; (Fiji) Lolohea Loco; (Australia) Matai Nairavu; (Australia) Ah-mu Tuimalealiifano; (Australia) Semisi Tupou (c); (Fiji) Nailati Ukalele; Fullback: (Australia) Isaiah Leota; (Australia) **Jack Maddocks**^{1}; (Australia) Justin Marsters; Notes:
**Bold** denotes player is internationally capped. (c) Denotes team captain. ^{1} denotes marquee player.

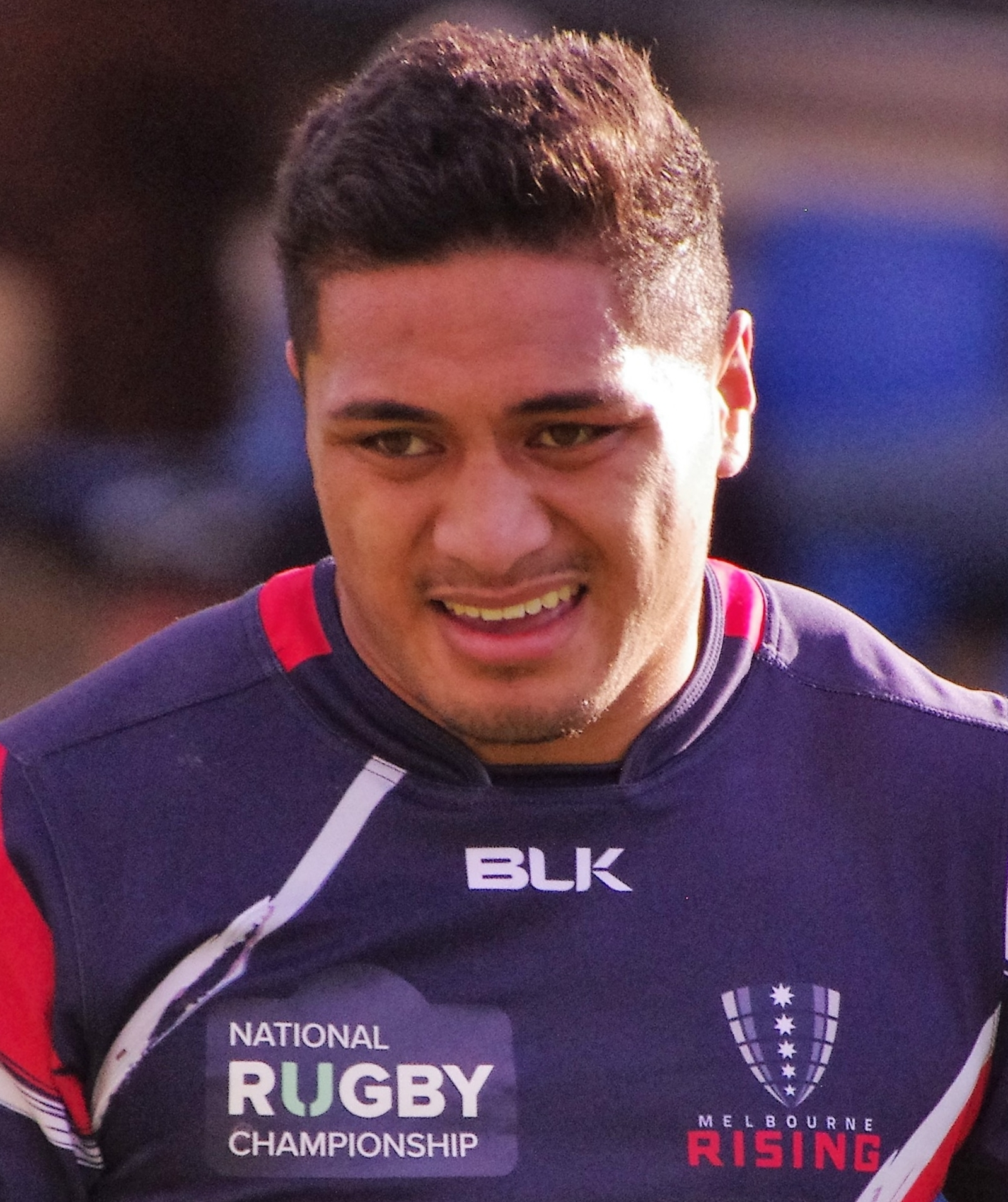
Flanker Ikapote Tupai.

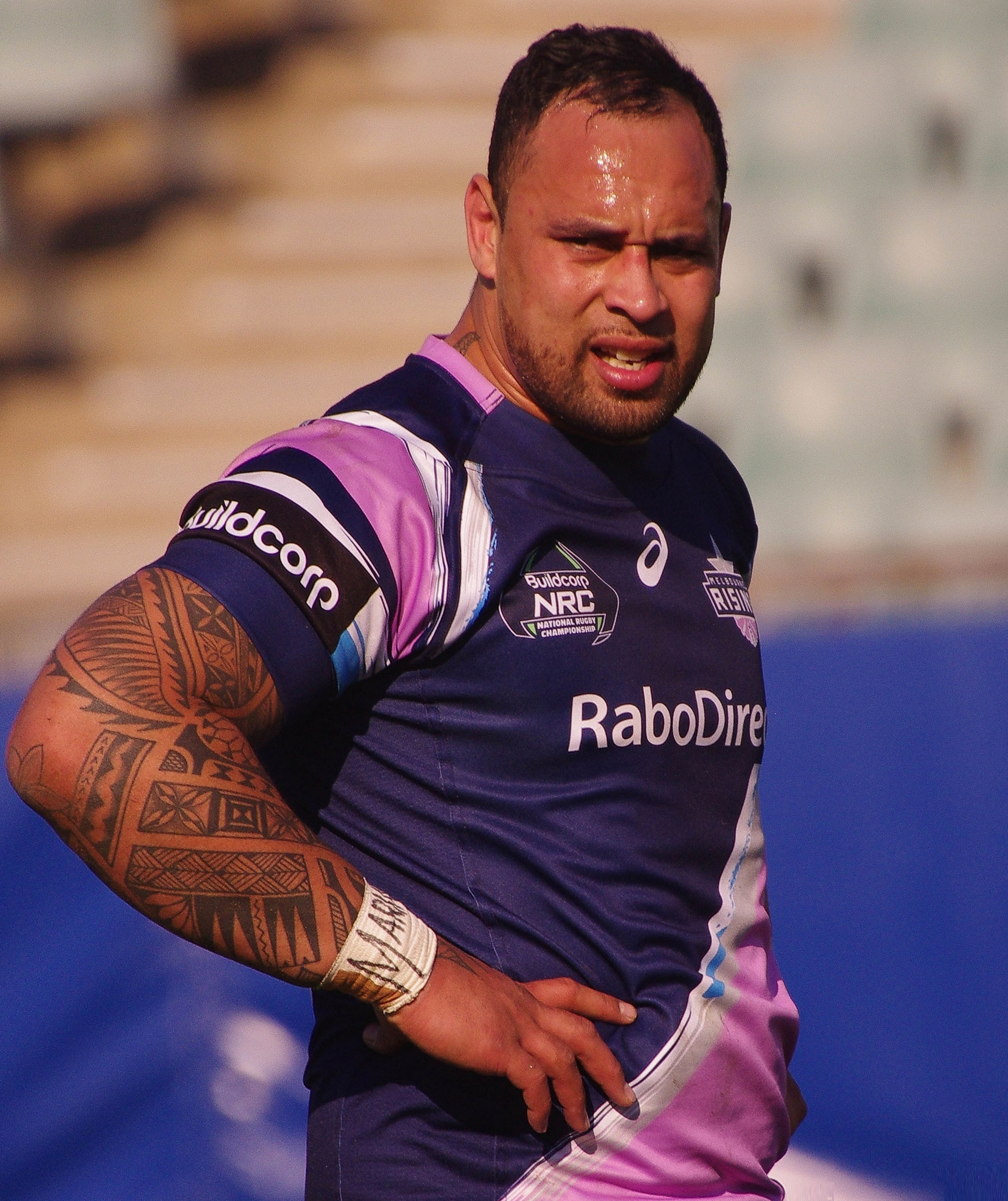
Centre Lloyd Johansson.

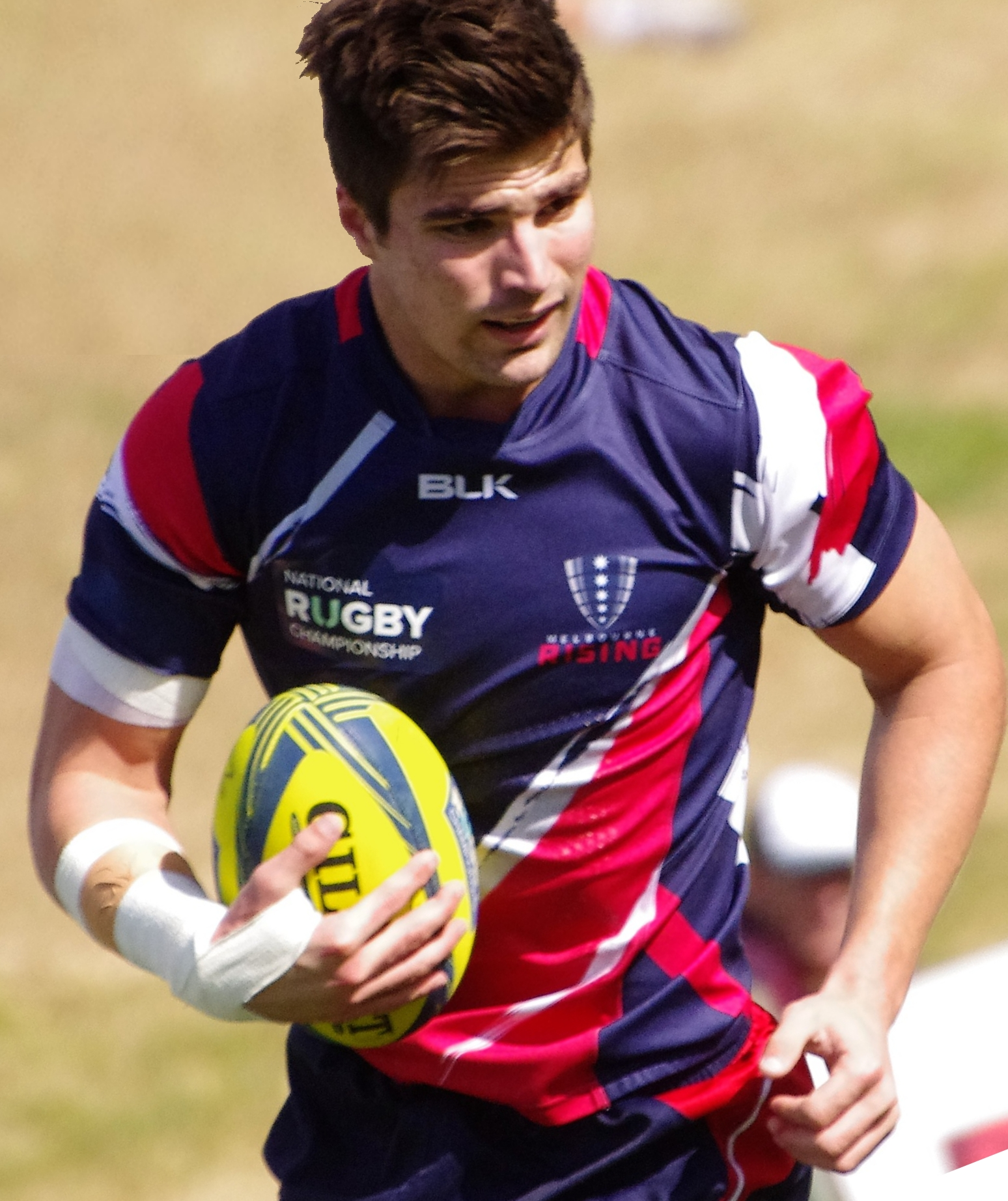
Fullback Jack Maddocks.

== Records ==
=== Honours ===
- **National Rugby Championship**
  - Playoff appearances: 2014, 2015, 2016
- **Horan-Little Shield**
  - Season winners: 2014
- **Australian Rugby Championship** (Rebels)
  - Runners-up: 2007

=== Season standings ===
National Rugby Championship

Year	Pos	Pld	W	D	L	F	A	+/-	BP	Pts	Play-offs
2014	1st	8	8	0	0	399	184	+215	8	40	Semi-final loss to Perth Spirit by 29–45.
2015	3rd	8	5	0	3	220	251	−31	0	20	Semi-final loss to UC Vikings by 50–34.
2016	4th	7	3	0	4	260	262	−2	4	16	Semi-final loss to NSW Country by 50–24
2017	9th	8	1	0	7	193	357	–164	0	4	Did not compete
2018	6th	7	2	0	5	239	192	+47	5	13	Did not compete
2019	7th	7	2	0	5	206	211	–5	3	11	Did not compete

Australian Rugby Championship (Rebels)

Year	Pos	Pld	W	D	L	F	A	+/-	BP	Pts	Play-offs
2007	**4th**	8	5	0	3	170	206	–36	4	**24**	Runners-up

=== Head coaches ===
- Pom Simona (2019–present)
- Eoin Toolan (2018)
- Zane Hilton (2015–2017)
- Sean Hedger (2014)
- Bill Millard (2007) – Rebels ARC

=== Captains ===
- Semisi Tupou (2019–present)
- Angus Cottrell (2018)
- Steve Cummins (2017)
- Nic Stirzaker (2016)
- Colby Fainga'a and Scott Fuglistaller (2015)
- Nic Stirzaker (2014)
- David Croft (2007) – Rebels ARC

=== Squads ===
2019 Melbourne Rising squad – NRC
The squad for the 2019 National Rugby Championship season:
**Props**: **Jermaine Ainsley**; Angus Arundel; Pone Fa'amausili; **Tetera Faulkner**; Matt Gibbon; Noa Noa; Fereti Sa'aga; Junior Uelese; **Hookers**: Anaru Rangi; JP Sauni; Moli Sooaemalelagi; Mahe Vailanu; **Locks**: Will Clift; Esei Ha'angana; Trevor Hosea; **Matt Philip**	**Loose forwards**: Angus Cottrell; **Richard Hardwick**; Ross Haylett-Petty; **Luke Jones**; Boyd Killingworth; Rob Leota; Pat Morrey; Maciu Nabolakasi; George Noa; Katinali Tai; Joseva Tamani; Ola Tauelangi; Ikapote Tupai; **Scrum-halves**: Reece Fuller; Delai Moto; Theo Strang; **Fly-halves**: Navarre Haisila; Michael Moloney; **James So'oialo**	**Centres**: **Rodney Iona**; **Lloyd Johansson**; William Lewesi; Harry Potter; **Wingers**: Taylor Acheson; Lolohea Loco; Matai Nairavu; Ah-mu Tuimalealiifano; Semisi Tupou (c); Nailati Ukalele; **Fullbacks**: Isaiah Leota; **Jack Maddocks**^{1}; Justin Marsters; (c) Denotes team captain, **Bold** denotes player is internationally capped, ^{1} denotes allocated national player additional to the contracted squad.

2018 Melbourne Rising squad – NRC
The squad for the 2018 National Rugby Championship season:
**Props**: **Jermaine Ainsley**^{1}; Mees Erasmus; Pone Fa'amausili; Tom Moloney; Fereti Sa'aga; **Laurie Weeks**; **Hookers**: Feta Luamanu; Anaru Rangi; Andrew Tuala; **Locks**: Will Clift; Esei Ha'angana; Trevor Hosea; Sakaria Noa; **Matt Philip**	**Loose forwards**: Angus Cottrell (c); **Richard Hardwick**; Rob Leota; Isi Naisarani; George Noa; Ikapote Tupai; Kojiro Yoshida; **Scrum-halves**: Harrison Goddard; Michael Ruru; **Fly-halves**: Archie King; **Jack Maddocks**^{1}	**Centres**: Fabian Goodall; Angelo Leaupepe; Bill Meakes; Sione Tui; Sione Tuipulotu; **Wingers**: Tom English; Justin Masters; **Sefa Naivalu**^{1}; Kitione Ratu; **Fullbacks**: Kemu Valetini; (c) Denotes team captain, **Bold** denotes player is internationally capped, ^{1} denotes allocated national player additional to the contracted squad.

2017 Melbourne Rising squad – NRC
The squad for the 2017 National Rugby Championship season:
**Props**: Angus Arundel; Tom Moloney; Rory O’Connor; Fereti Sa'aga; **Toby Smith**^{1}; Mahe Vailanu; **Hookers**: **James Hanson**; Siliva Siliva; **Jordan Uelese**; **Locks**: Steve Cummins (c); Pone Fa’amuasili; Esei Ha'angana; Alex Toolis; Emmanuel Maufou	**Loose forwards**: Josh Fenner; Simei Kolio; Rob Leota; **Sean McMahon**; Sione Taufa; **Lopeti Timani**^{1}; Ikapote Tupai; **Scrum-halves**: Maradona Farao; Harrison Goddard; Nic Stirzaker; **Fly-halves**: Jack McGregor	**Centres**: **Lloyd Johansson**; Angelo Leaupepe; Hunter Paisami; Oliva Sialau; Sione Tuipulotu; Semisi Tupou; **Wingers**: Henry Hutchison; **Marika Koroibete**; **Sefa Naivalu**^{1}; **Fullbacks**: Jack Maddocks; **Reece Hodge**^{1}; Kitione Ratu; Notes: (c) Team captain **Bold** denotes internationally capped players at the time^{1} National player additional to contracted squad.

2016 Melbourne Rising squad – NRC
The squad for the 2016 National Rugby Championship season:
**Props**: Cruze Ah-Nau; Tyrel Lomax; Tim Metcher; Tom Moloney; Fereti Sa'aga; **Toby Smith**^{1}; **Hookers**: **James Hanson**^{1}; Patrick Leafa; Siliva Siliva; Jordan Uelese; **Locks**: Steve Cummins; Murray Douglas; Sam Jeffries; Alex Toolis	**Loose forwards**: Colby Fainga'a; Harley Fox; Ikapote Tupai; Rob Leota; **Sean McMahon**^{1}; Jordy Reid; Sione Taufa; **Scrum-halves**: Ben Meehan; Michael Snowden; Nic Stirzaker (c); **Fly-halves**: Jack Debreczeni	**Centres**: **Lloyd Johansson**; Taiso Silafai-Leaana; Sefa Naivalu; Sione Tuipulotu; Elias Vole; **Wingers**: Tom English; **Dom Shipperley**; Ah-Mu Tuimaleali'ifano; **Fullbacks**: Reece Hodge; Jack Maddocks; Jonah Placid; Notes: (c) Team captain **Bold** denotes internationally capped players at the time^{1} National player additional to contracted squad.

2015 Melbourne Rising squad – NRC
The squad for the 2015 National Rugby Championship season:
**Props**: Cruze Ah-Nau; Duncan Chubb; Tim Metcher; Fereti Sa'aga; Mike Tyler; **Hookers**: Mitch Andrews; Patrick Leafa; **Locks**: Steve Cummins; Murray Douglas; Sam Jeffries; **Luke Jones**^{1}; Sakaria Noa	**Loose forwards**: Colby Fainga'a (c); Scott Fuglistaller (c); **Sean McMahon**^{1}; Jordy Reid; Pom Simona; Sione Taufa; Lopeti Timani; **Scrum-halves**: Maradona Farao; Ben Meehan; Junior Paila; **Fly-halves**: Jack Debreczeni	**Centres**: **Lloyd Johansson**; Taiso Silafai-Leaana; Leo Taliu; Sasa Tofilau; Sione Tuipulotu; **Wingers**: Tom English^{1}; Stacey Ili; Filipe Vilitati; **Dom Shipperley**; **Fullbacks**: Justin Marsters; Jonah Placid; Notes: (c) Team captain **Bold** denotes internationally capped players at the time^{1} National player additional to contracted squad.

2014 Melbourne Rising squad – NRC
The squad for the 2014 National Rugby Championship season:
**Props**: Cruze Ah-Nau; Paul Alo-Emile; Fereti Sa'aga; Finbar Simpson; Toby Smith; Tui Tuiatua; **Hookers**: Greg Bauer; Patrick Leafa; Tom Sexton; **Locks**: Frank Amituanai; Angus Hamilton; Sam Jeffries; **Luke Jones**^{1}; Cadeyrn Neville	**Loose forwards**: **Scott Higginbotham**^{1}; Sean McMahon; OJ Noa; Reuben Rolleston; Pom Simona; Sione Taufa; Lopeti Timani; **Scrum-halves**: **Luke Burgess**; Ben Meehan; Junior Paila; Nic Stirzaker (c); **Fly-halves**: Jack Debreczeni; Shane Imo; Martin Naufahu	**Centres**: Mitch Inman; **Lloyd Johansson**; Sefa Naivalu; **Wingers**: Tom English; Joe Kamana; Telusa Veainu; **Fullbacks**: Rennie Lautolo-Molimau; Jonah Placid; Notes: (c) Team captain **Bold** denotes internationally capped players at the time^{1} National player additional to contracted squad.

2007 Melbourne Rebels squad – ARC
**Props**: Scott Cameron; Heamani Lavaka; Dan Palmer; Mike Ross; **Hookers**: Nick Churven; James Hanson; Nick Hensley; **Locks**: **Matt Cockbain**; Liam Shaw; Richard Stanford	**Loose forwards**: **David Croft** (c); David Dennis; Dave Haigh; David Haydon; Matt Hodgson; Shawn Mackay; Filipe Manu; **Scrum-halves**: Luke Burgess; Jon McGrath; **Fly-halves**: Michael Hobbs; Dan Kelly	**Centres**: Luke Cross; Jack Farrer; James Lew; **Wings**: **Digby Ioane**; Peter Playford; Peter Owens; Nathan Trist; **Fullbacks**: Damon Murphy; Notes: (c) Team captain **Bold** denotes internationally capped players at the time

== See also ==
- Rugby Victoria
- Melbourne Rebels
