= Eoin Toolan =

Irish rugby union coach

- Born: 1982 (age 43–44) Ireland
- Height: 5 ft 8 in (1.73 m)

Rugby union career
- Position: Fullback
- Current team: Melbourne Rebels / Melbourne Rising
Senior career
Years	Team	Apps	(Points)
- Greystones
Coaching career
- Years: Team
- 2008–2013: Ireland (performance analyst)
- 2013–: Melbourne Rebels (performance analyst)
- 2018–: Melbourne Rising

Eoin Toolan (born 1982) is an Irish professional rugby union football coach. He was previously the head coach of the Melbourne Rising team that plays in the NRC competition, while also being the performance analyst for the Melbourne Rebels. Toolan was a former Greystones Rugby Football Club player in Ireland. He was previously performance analyst for the Ireland national team.
