= Brisbane Global Rugby Tens =

Brisbane Global 10s
- Sport: Rugby tens
- Founded: 2017
- Folded: 2018
- No. of teams: 12 (men); 4 (women)
- Venue: Suncorp Stadium
- Last champions: Blues (Men; 2018); Reds (Women; 2018)
- Most titles: Chiefs (1); Blues (1)
- Website: brisbaneglobaltens.com (Defunct)

The Brisbane Global Rugby Tens (commonly known as the Brisbane Tens) was a professional rugby tens tournament held in February at Suncorp Stadium in Brisbane, Australia. Hosted by Duco Events and the Queensland Rugby Union, the event featured Super Rugby teams from Australia and New Zealand alongside invited international clubs.

The inaugural tournament was held in 2017. After two editions, the tournament was placed on an indefinite hiatus in 2019 due to scheduling conflicts and financial challenges, and has not been held since.

== History ==
The tournament was designed as a rugby union equivalent to the NRL Auckland Nines, aiming to provide a high-profile pre-season showcase for Super Rugby talent. The Super Rugby teams from Australia and New Zealand took part in both editions, with various international teams invited to participate. For the 2017 tournament, RC Toulonnais, Blue Bulls, Manu Samoa, and the Panasonic Wild Knights were invited. The 2018 edition saw the inclusion of Pau and a Fiji representative side.

Teams competed for a prize pool including a $250,000 AUD grand prize, playing in group stages before entering a knockout finals format. A 'legend wildcard' was allocated to each team, allowing a former star player to join their match-day squad; notable wildcards included Stephen Larkham (Brumbies), Carlos Spencer (Blues), and Andrew Mehrtens (Classic Wallabies).

== Cancellation ==
In June 2018, organizers announced that the 2019 edition of the tournament would be cancelled. The decision was attributed to player availability concerns surrounding the 2019 Rugby World Cup and the 12-week mandatory off-season for international players. Additionally, reports indicated the tournament had incurred financial losses of over $2 million AUD across its two years due to lower-than-expected crowd attendance. Although initially described as a hiatus, the event has not returned to the rugby calendar.

== Overview ==
A Tens game lasts 20 minutes with 10 minutes for each half, except for the final, which lasts 30 minutes with 15 minutes for each half. After a try is scored, 40 seconds is allocated for a drop goal conversion. Matches were played over two days at Suncorp Stadium, which has a capacity of 52,500.

== Winners ==
=== Men ===
| Year | No. of Teams | | Final | | | | Semi-finalists | |
| Year | No. of Teams | | Winner | Score | Runner-up | | Semi-finalists | |
| 2017 | 14 | | Chiefs | 12–5 | Crusaders | | Blue Bulls | Hurricanes |
| 2018 | 12 | Blues | 10–7 | Hurricanes | Reds | Crusaders | | |

=== Women ===
A women's competition was first contested in 2018, featuring four Australian Super W teams.

| Year | No. of Teams | Final | | | Placings | |
| Year | No. of Teams | Winner | Score | Runner-up | Third | Fourth |
| 2018 | 4 | Reds | 10–5 | Waratahs | Brumbies | Rebels |
