= Sean Hedger =

- Born: Sean Hedger; 1974 (age 51–52)

Rugby union career
- Position: Head Coach Bond University
Coaching career
- Years: Team
- 2015–: Bond University Rugby Club
- 2014: Melbourne Rising
- 2011–12: Kyuden Voltex

Sean Hedger (born 1974) is an Australian professional rugby union coach. He is currently an assistant coach of the Super Rugby team the Melbourne Rebels. He was appointed as head coach of the Melbourne Rising for the inaugural season of Australia's National Rugby Championship in 2014.

Hedger began his professional rugby coaching career with the Queensland Reds as the co-ordinator of their Rugby College, before assuming the role of head coach of their rugby programme from 2003 to 2005. He was also an assistant coach of Australia Under-21 in 2004. In mid 2005, Hedger re-located to Japan, fulfilling multiple coaching roles with Top League team, Kobelco Steelers, over five years. In 2010, he became assistant coach of Kyuden Voltex for a season, before accepting the role of head coach.

He then returned home to Australia, where he was appointed as head coach of the ARU's National Academy for New South Wales. He joined the Melbourne Rebels as the club's attack coach for the 2014 Super Rugby season. After the launch of the National Rugby Championship, he was appointed as head coach of the Melbourne Rising team to play in the new competition. In October 2015, Hedger departed as coach of Melbourne Rising, having accepted the position of Director of Rugby with Bond University Rugby Club in his native Queensland.

Hedger's coaching role models are Alastair Clarkson and Darren Lehmann.
