= Fereti Sa'aga =

- Born: Fereti Eteuati Sa'aga; 26 February 1995 (age 31) Melbourne, Australia
- Height: 1.86 m (6 ft 1 in)
- Weight: 126 kg (19 st 12 lb)
- School: Melbourne Grammar School
- Notable relative: Scott Sio (cousin)

Rugby union career
- Position: Prop
Amateur team(s)
Years	Team	Apps	(Points)
- Northern Panthers
–	Melbourne University		
Senior career
Years	Team	Apps	(Points)
2014–2019	Melbourne Rising	28	(0)
- Correct as of 17 June 2020
Super Rugby
Years	Team	Apps	(Points)
2017–2020	Rebels	25	(5)
- Correct as of 17 June 2020

Fereti Sa'aga (born 26 February 1995) is a former Australian professional rugby union player who played for the Melbourne Rebels in Super Rugby and Melbourne Rising in the National Rugby Championship. His position was prop.

== Career ==
He made his debut for the Rebels against the Hurricanes as a late replacement for Tyrel Lomax in a 71-6 defeat for the Rebels.

== Super Rugby statistics ==
As of 27 May 2020

Season	Team	Games	Starts	Sub	Mins	Tries	Cons	Pens	Drops	Points	Yel	Red
2017	Rebels	12	6	6	508	0	0	0	0	0	1	0
2018	Rebels	12	5	7	497	1	0	0	0	5	0	0
2019	Rebels	0	0	0	0	0	0	0	0	0	0	0
2020	Rebels	1	1	0	58	0	0	0	0	0	0	0
Total		25	12	13	1063	1	0	0	0	5	1	0
