= Sukhia Tuimalealiʻifano Go =

Fijian businesswoman

- Education: University of the South Pacific
- Occupation: Businessperson

Sukhia Tuimalealiʻifano Go is a Fijian businesswoman. She holds a degree in management and economics from the University of the South Pacific, and in 2015 she completed a post graduate qualification in human resources management.

== Life ==
In 2012, Go decided to open a business with her mother. Together they founded The Gift Hut, an online business which produces and sells elei, a Samoan form of woodblock printing. In 2014 the company won the Fiji Development Bank's Small Business Award in the Wholesale & Retail category. In 2015, Go won the Aspiring Entrepreneur of the Year Award at the Women in Business Awards.
