= Nic Stirzaker =

Australia international rugby union player

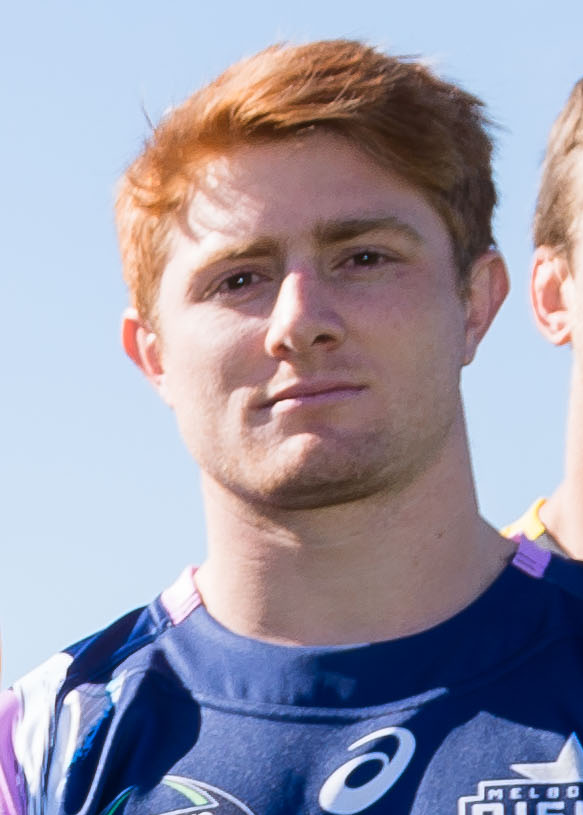
- Stirzaker with Melbourne Rising in 2014
- Born: Nic Stirzaker; 8 March 1991 (age 35) London, England
- Height: 1.79 m (5 ft 10 1/2 in)
- Weight: 80 kg (12 st 8 lb; 176 lb)
- School: Knox Grammar School, Sydney
- University: Sydney University

Rugby union career
- Position: Scrum-half
Senior career
Years	Team	Apps	(Points)
2014–2017	Melbourne Rising	17	(35)
2018	Saracens	2	(0)
2018–2020	Bristol	18	(0)
2020–2022	Montauban	24	(15)
- Correct as of 6 November 2017
Provincial / State sides
Years	Team	Apps	(Points)
2013	Manawatu	10	(15)
- Correct as of 22 October 2013
Super Rugby
Years	Team	Apps	(Points)
2012–2017	Rebels	60	(30)
- Correct as of 6 November 2017
International career
Years	Team	Apps	(Points)
2016	Australia XV	1	(0)

Nic Stirzaker (born 8 March 1991) is a former Australian rugby union footballer. His regular playing position is scrum-half and most recently played for the Montauban in the Pro D2. Prior to that he represented the Rebels in Super Rugby and Melbourne Rising in the National Rugby Championship and Bristol Bears in Premiership Rugby.

== Early life ==
Stirzaker was born in England to South African parents, but was raised in Australia from the age of two. He is one of three brothers and developed his love of Rugby at Knox Grammar School in Sydney.

== Club career ==
Playing rugby at both Knox Grammar School and Sydney University, Stirzaker was signed to be a part of the Rebels extended playing squad during the 2012 season only playing a total of three games all coming off the bench. After his debut season as an extended player, Stirzaker played eleven games for the Rebels throughout 2013, starting twice and coming off the bench on nine occasions. On 25 June 2013, Stirzaker come off the bench in the 55th minute to play for the Rebels against the British & Irish Lions during their 2013 tour in a 0–35 defeat at AAMI Park, Melbourne.

In March 2014, Stirzaker re-signed with the Rebels until the succession of the 2015 season. Stirzaker was subsequently released to Palmerston North-based ITM Cup team Manawatu Rugby Club for the 2013 season. Finishing the season fifth in the Championship division, Stirzaker scored a total of three tries before returning to the Rebels in 2014.

Sustaining an injury before the 2014 season, Stirzaker only played eight of the sixteen games, starting in just four. After a fairly successful 2015 season for Stirzaker – playing fifteen games, scoring three tries, and helped lead the Rebels to a mid-table finish – he was among rumours of a possible call up to the Wallabies squad. Stirzaker is eligible to represent three countries internationally. Australia, England, and South Africa.

In early 2016, Stirzaker was announced as captain of the Rebels ahead of the season. He had undergone off-season shoulder surgery causing him to miss the season-opening match of the 2016 season against the Force in Perth. Stirzaker returned to full fitness to play the Waratahs in 17–21 victory in round 6 at Allianz Stadium, Sydney. He played a total of eleven games scoring two tries.

In January 2018, Stirzaker signed a short, three-month term contract for Saracens in the Aviva Premiership for the 2017–18 season.

In late January 2018, Bristol Rugby announced that Stirzaker would join them for the upcoming 2018-19 Premiership Rugby season.

After leaving Bristol, Stirzaker moves to France to join Pro D2 outfit Montauban for the 2020–21 season.

== International career ==
Stirzaker was selected and played for Australia XV that played the French Barbarians in late 2016 losing 19–11 in Bordeaux.

== Super Rugby statistics ==
As of 6 November 2017

Season	Team	Games	Starts	Sub	Mins	Tries	Cons	Pens	Drops	Points	Yel	Red
2012	Rebels	4	0	4	30	0	0	0	0	0	0	0
2013	Rebels	11	2	9	242	0	0	0	0	0	0	0
2014	Rebels	8	4	4	315	0	0	0	0	0	0	0
2015	Rebels	15	14	1	1039	3	0	0	0	15	1	0
2016	Rebels	11	9	2	577	2	0	0	0	10	0	0
2017	Rebels	11	11	0	708	1	0	0	0	5	1	1
Total		60	40	19	2911	6	0	0	0	30	2	1
