= Sean McMahon =

Australia international rugby union player

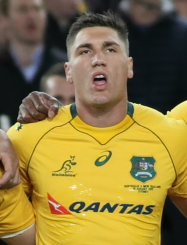
- McMahon before Bledisloe Cup I, 2017.
- Born: 18 June 1994 (age 32) Brisbane, Queensland, Australia
- Height: 186 cm (6 ft 1 in)
- Weight: 102 kg (225 lb)
- School: St Joseph's College, Nudgee

Rugby union career
- Position(s): Flanker, Number 8
- Current team: Suntory Sungoliath
Senior career
| Years | Team | Apps | (Points) |
| 2014–2017 | Melbourne Rising | 6 | (10) |
| 2017– | Suntory Sungoliath | 69 | (110) |
- Correct as of 21 January 2022
Super Rugby
| Years | Team | Apps | (Points) |
| 2014–2017 | Rebels | 49 | (20) |
International career
| Years | Team | Apps | (Points) |
| 2011 | Australia Schoolboys | 2 | (15) |
| 2012–2014 | Australia U20 | 8 | (10) |
| 2014–2017 | Australia | 27 | (15) |
- Correct as of 25 November 2021
National sevens team
| Years | Team | | Comps |
| 2012– | Australia Sevens | | 22 |

Official website
- seanmcmahonrugby.com

Sean McMahon (born 18 June 1994) is an Australian rugby union player for Suntory Sungoliath in the Japanese Top League. His regular playing position is Flanker.

== Early life and career ==
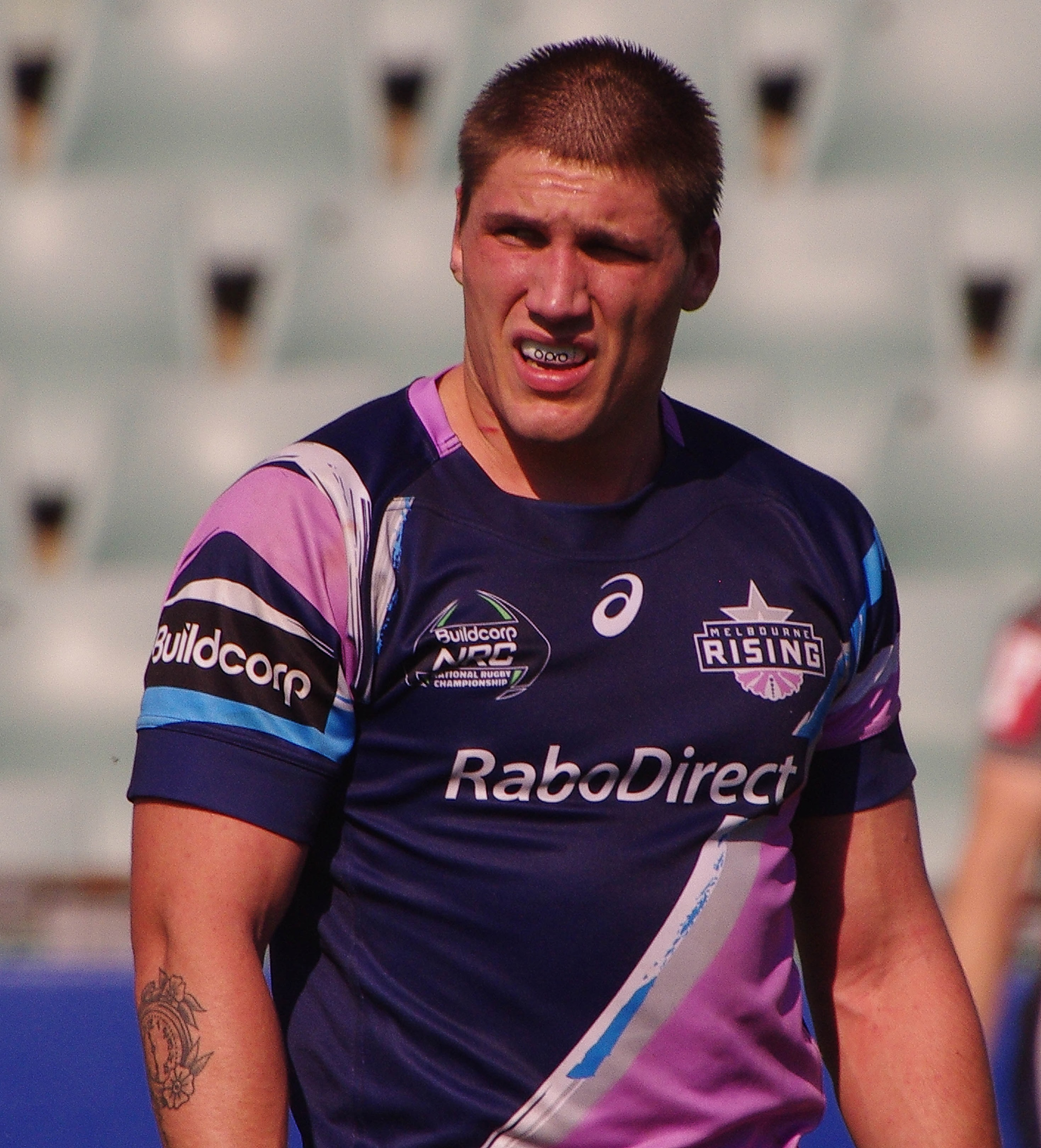
McMahon in 2014

McMahon was born and raised in Brisbane and took his first steps in senior rugby with GPS in the Queensland Premier Rugby competition. He played in the side which was runner-up in the 2013 competition and featured alongside future Rebels team-mates Colby Faingaa and Bryce Hegarty. McMahon's displays saw him named as a member of the Melbourne Rebels extended playing squad for the 2014 Super Rugby season. He was surprisingly named in the number 6 jersey for the Rebels season opener against the Cheetahs at AAMI Park on 28 February 2014. McMahon played the whole 80 minutes in a 35–14 victory for the home side.

On 16 April 2014, the Melbourne Rebels announced that McMahon signed a new two-year deal, running until the end of 2016. McMahon is also an avid golfer and a 5 handicap.

McMahon then played for Suntory Sungoliath in the Japanese Top League.

== International career ==
McMahon represented Australia Schoolboys in 2011, at the age of 17, before becoming the youngest ever player to play for the Australia Sevens team in 2011, going on to feature for the side for another two years. while also making the Australia under-20 squad for the 2012 IRB Junior World Championship in South Africa. In May 2014, he was named to captain Australia in the 2014 IRB Junior World Championship, to commence in Auckland in June. This followed his strong performances with the Australian Sevens and the Melbourne Rebels.

On 22 October 2014, McMahon was named in the Australian national team for the Wallabies 2014 End-of-year test, under the new coach of Michael Cheika. He made his first appearance against the Barbarians on 1 November, but it was a week later he made his test debut against Wales at the Millennium Stadium, starting in the #6 Jersey.

He was a member of the 2015 World Cup Squad. He started at no.7 in the pool matches against Uruguay and Wales, scoring 2 tries against Uruguay in a comprehensive victory.

== Super Rugby statistics ==
As of 21 July 2016

| Season | Team | Games | Starts | Sub | Mins | Tries | Cons | Pens | Drops | Points | Yel | Red |
|---|---|---|---|---|---|---|---|---|---|---|---|---|
| 2014 | Rebels | 13 | 6 | 7 | 584 | 0 | 0 | 0 | 0 | 0 | 0 | 0 |
| 2015 | Rebels | 15 | 15 | 0 | 1030 | 1 | 0 | 0 | 0 | 5 | 1 | 0 |
| 2016 | Rebels | 14 | 14 | 0 | 1110 | 3 | 0 | 0 | 0 | 15 | 1 | 0 |
| 2017 | Rebels | 4 | 3 | 1 | 247 | 0 | 0 | 0 | 0 | 0 | 0 | 0 |
| Total | | 46 | 38 | 8 | 2971 | 4 | 0 | 0 | 0 | 20 | 2 | 0 |
