= Sefa Naivalu =

Australia international rugby union player

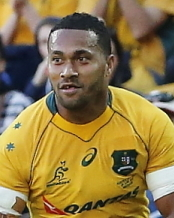
- Full name: Sefanaia Naivalu
- Born: 7 January 1992 (age 34) Levuka, Fiji
- Height: 1.86 m (6 ft 1 in)
- Weight: 101 kg (15 st 13 lb; 223 lb)

Rugby union career
- Position: Centre / Wing
- Current team: US Carcassonne
Amateur team(s)
Years	Team	Apps	(Points)
−2013	Ovalau Rugby Club		
2014	Box Hill Broncos		
Senior career
Years	Team	Apps	(Points)
2014−2018	Melbourne Rising	9	(30)
2015–2018	Rebels	46	(80)
2019	Reds	13	(15)
2019-2024	Stade Français Paris	50	(85)
2024-	US Carcassonne	9	(0)
- Correct as of 12 April 2025
International career
Years	Team	Apps	(Points)
2016−	Australia	9	(25)
- Correct as of 16 November 2018

Sefanaia Naivalu (born 7 January 1992), known simply as Sefa, is an Australian rugby union professional player who currently plays as a centre or wing for US Carcassonne in the French third tier, the Championnat Fédéral Nationale. He also represented Melbourne Rising in the inaugural National Rugby Championship. He has a 100 metre recorded time of 10.5seconds in 2011.

== Career ==
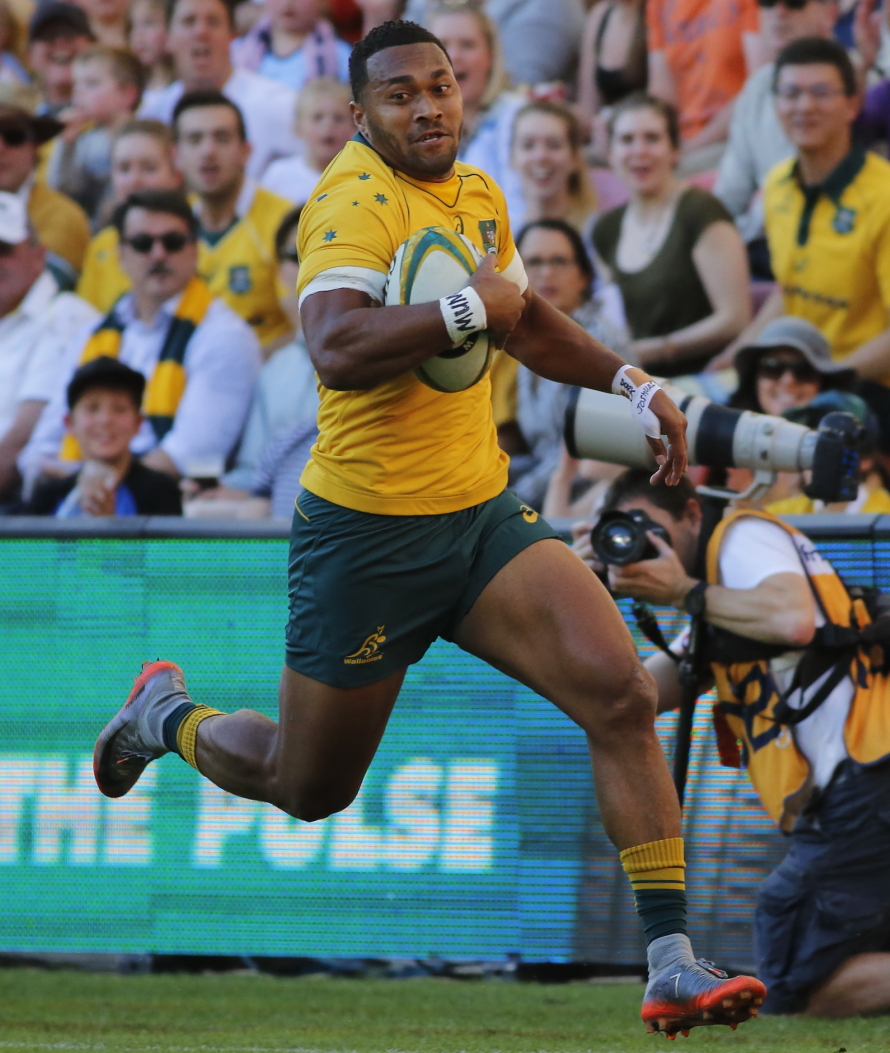
Naivalu playing for the Wallabies against Italy, 24 June 2017

Naivalu started out his rugby career with the Ovalau Rugby Club in his native Fiji before moving to Australia at the beginning of 2014 with the Rugby Plus Program. He joined the Box Hill Broncos who play in the local Dewar Shield in Victoria and made an immediate impact by becoming the leading try and point scorer in the competition which in turn saw his side reach the tournament's Grand Final.

These performance brought him to the attention of the newly formed Melbourne Rising who competed in the first ever National Rugby Championship in 2014. 5 tries in 5 appearances at the beginning of the season were enough to convince local Super Rugby franchise the Melbourne Rebels of his worth and he made history by becoming the first Rebel ever to be signed directly from a Dewar Shield side.

For the 2016 Rugby Championship, wallabies coach Michael Cheika called Sefa Naivalu for the 33 men squad in preparation for the test against South Africa and Argentina, although the player will not be eligible until September the 18th, one day after the match between the Wallabies and the Pumas.

On 22 March 2019, Naivalu would travel to France to sign for Top 14 side Stade Français Paris from the 2019-20 season after the 2019 Rugby World Cup.

== Super Rugby statistics ==
As of 15 July 2018

Season	Team	Games	Starts	Sub	Mins	Tries	Cons	Pens	Drops	Points	Yel	Red
2015	Rebels	13	8	5	561	4	0	0	0	20	1	0
2016	Rebels	10	9	1	707	6	0	0	0	30	0	0
2017	Rebels	9	9	0	702	1	0	0	0	5	0	0
2018	Rebels	14	8	6	641	5	0	0	0	25	0	0
Total		46	34	12	2611	16	0	0	0	80	1	0
