= Tom English (rugby union) =

Australian rugby player

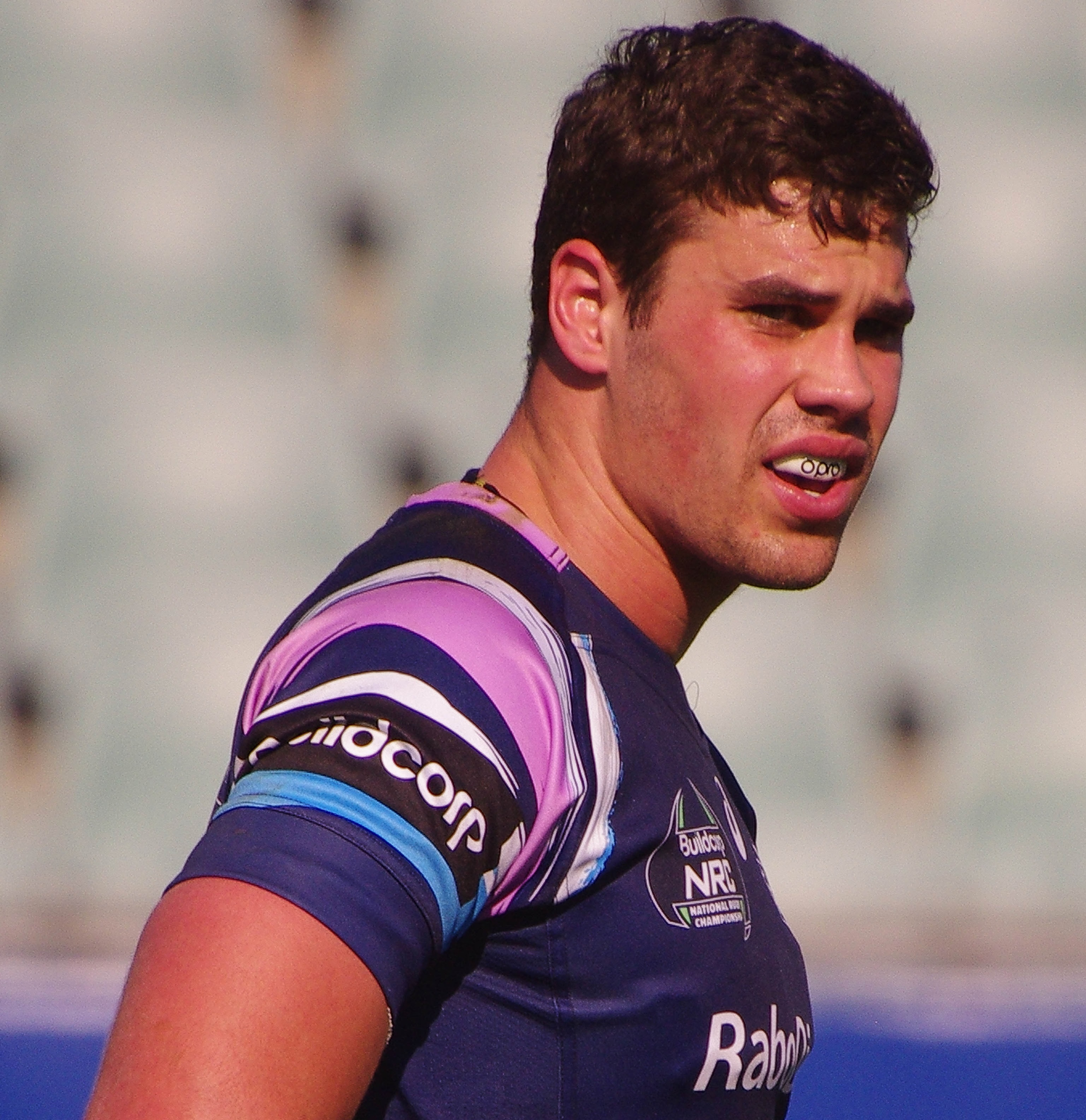
- English in 2014
- Born: Tom English; 8 March 1991 (age 35) Sydney, New South Wales, Australia
- Height: 1.87 m (6 ft 1 1/2 in)
- Weight: 96 kg (15 st 2 lb)
- School: Waverley College, Sydney
- University: University of Sydney

Rugby union career
- Position(s): Centre, Wing
Amateur team(s)
| Years | Team | Apps | (Points) |
- Sydney University
Senior career
| Years | Team | Apps | (Points) |
| 2014–2019 | Melbourne Rising | 25 | (110) |
| 2019–2023 | Kurita Water Gush | 31 | (25) |
- Correct as of 27 May 2020
Super Rugby
| Years | Team | Apps | (Points) |
| 2013–2020 | Rebels | 97 | (110) |
- Correct as of 29 September 2020
National sevens team
| Years | Team | | Comps |
| 2012 | Australia sevens | | |

Tom English (born 8 March 1991) is an Australian former professional rugby player, who played for the Melbourne Rebels in the Super Rugby. English played as a centre or winger.

== Rugby career ==
=== Rugby sevens ===
English is a former Australia Sevens representative. In 2011, he was named at inside centre for Sydney University in the final of the Shute Shield. The side was to be captained by Rebels flanker Tim Davidson.

=== Rebels ===
In late 2012 English joined the Melbourne Rebels Extended Playing Squad. He stayed with the Rebels into 2013 and was named on the bench to play the Western Force in Round 1 and ACT Brumbies for Round 2 but didn't play. He made his Super Rugby debut when he replaced inside center Rory Sidey against the Reds in Round 4. Seven weeks later he started on the right wing and played 58 minutes before being replaced by Lachlan Mitchell.

In 2014, English faced competition for a place in the Rebels centers from Mitch Inman and New Zealand import Tamati Ellison.

In May 2014 English was invited to train with the Wallaby squad preparing for series against France.

== Super Rugby statistics ==
As of 12 September 2020

| Season | Team | Games | Starts | Sub | Mins | Tries | Cons | Pens | Drops | Points | Yel | Red |
|---|---|---|---|---|---|---|---|---|---|---|---|---|
| 2013 | Rebels | 9 | 8 | 1 | 625 | 5 | 0 | 0 | 0 | 25 | 0 | 0 |
| 2014 | Rebels | 16 | 16 | 0 | 1,239 | 1 | 0 | 0 | 0 | 5 | 0 | 0 |
| 2015 | Rebels | 14 | 12 | 2 | 934 | 2 | 0 | 0 | 0 | 10 | 0 | 0 |
| 2016 | Rebels | 11 | 10 | 1 | 762 | 2 | 0 | 0 | 0 | 10 | 0 | 0 |
| 2017 | Rebels | 14 | 14 | 0 | 1,050 | 3 | 0 | 0 | 0 | 15 | 0 | 0 |
| 2018 | Rebels | 16 | 14 | 2 | 1,139 | 4 | 0 | 0 | 0 | 20 | 0 | 0 |
| 2019 | Rebels | 14 | 12 | 2 | 856 | 5 | 0 | 0 | 0 | 25 | 0 | 0 |
| 2020 | Rebels | 3 | 3 | 0 | 240 | 0 | 0 | 0 | 0 | 0 | 1 | 0 |
| 2020 AU | Rebels | 0 | 0 | 0 | 0 | 0 | 0 | 0 | 0 | 0 | 0 | 0 |
| Total | | 97 | 89 | 8 | 6840 | 22 | 0 | 0 | 0 | 110 | 1 | 0 |
