= Cruze Ah-Nau =

Australian rugby union player

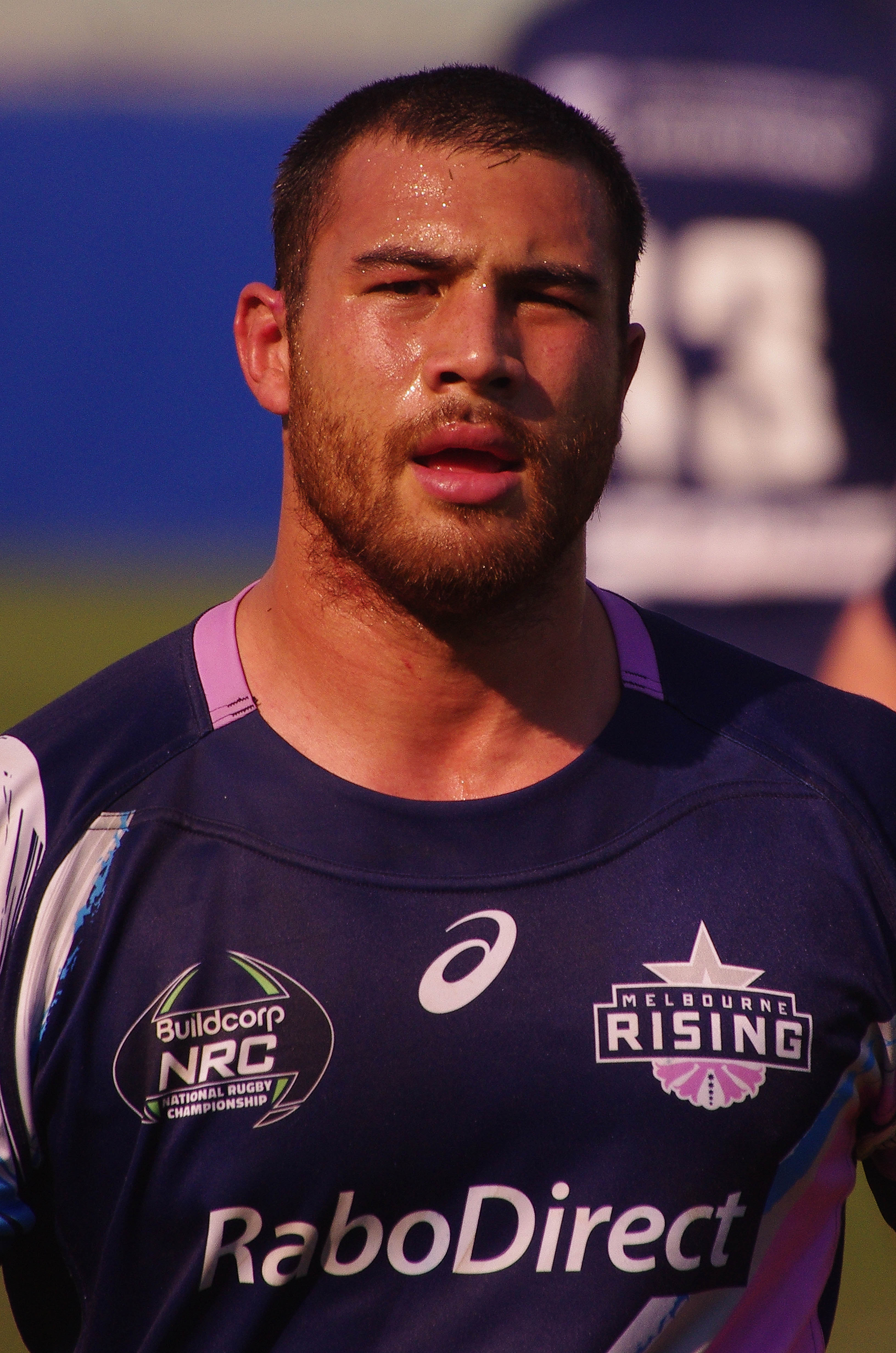
- Ah-Nau in 2014
- Born: Cruze Ah-Nau; 10 August 1990 (age 36) Perth, Western Australia, Australia
- Height: 1.81 m (5 ft 11 1/2 in)
- Weight: 115 kg (18 st 2 lb)

Rugby union career
- Position: Loosehead Prop
Senior career
Years	Team	Apps	(Points)
2013	Northern Suburbs	11	(0)
2014−2016	Melbourne Rising	21	(5)
2017–2019	Zebre	19	(0)
- Correct as of 3 November 2015
Super Rugby
Years	Team	Apps	(Points)
2011	Force	0	(0)
2013–2017	Rebels	43	(0)
- Correct as of 5 November 2017
International career
Years	Team	Apps	(Points)
2010	Australia U20	3	(0)
- Correct as of 24 December 2012

Cruze Ah-Nau (born 10 August 1990) is an Australian rugby union footballer who plays as a prop. He plays for Zebre in the Pro 14 competition. He was a member of the Melbourne Rebels Super Rugby Extended Playing Squad. Ah-Nau was previously a member of the Western Force squad during the 2011 Super Rugby season although he didn't make any appearances. He then moved east in 2012 to join Norths in the Shute Shield.

Ah-Nau was a member of the Australia Under 20 team that competed in the 2010 IRB Junior World Championship.

On 13 September 2017, it was confirmed he joined Italian franchise Zebre in the Pro 14 prior to the 2017–18 season.

== Super Rugby statistics ==
As of 5 November 2017

Season	Team	Games	Starts	Sub	Mins	Tries	Cons	Pens	Drops	Points	Yel	Red
2011	Force	0	0	0	0	0	0	0	0	0	0	0
2013	Rebels	0	0	0	0	0	0	0	0	0	0	0
2014	Rebels	11	2	9	318	0	0	0	0	0	0	0
2015	Rebels	12	1	11	223	0	0	0	0	0	0	0
2016	Rebels	14	3	11	334	0	0	0	0	0	0	0
2017	Rebels	6	2	4	206	0	0	0	0	0	0	0
Total		43	8	35	1,088	0	0	0	0	0	0	0
