= Ikapote Tupai =

- Born: 22 February 1996 (age 30) Auckland, New Zealand
- Height: 181 cm (5 ft 11 in)
- Weight: 100 kg (15 st 10 lb; 220 lb)

Rugby union career
- Position: Flanker
Senior career
Years	Team	Apps	(Points)
2016–	Melbourne Rising	19	(6)
Super Rugby
Years	Team	Apps	(Points)
2017	Rebels	0	(0)
2019–	Rebels		

Ikapote Tupai (born 22 February 1996) is a New Zealand born, Australian rugby union player who played for the Rebels in the Super Rugby competition. His position of choice is flanker.

== Super Rugby statistics ==
As of 16 June 2019

Season	Team	Games	Starts	Sub	Mins	Tries	Cons	Pens	Drops	Points	Yel	Red
2017	Rebels	0	0	0	0	0	0	0	0	0	0	0
2019	Rebels	0	0	0	0	0	0	0	0	0	0	0
Total		0	0	0	0	0	0	0	0	0	0	0
