= Toby Smith (rugby union) =

Australia international rugby union player

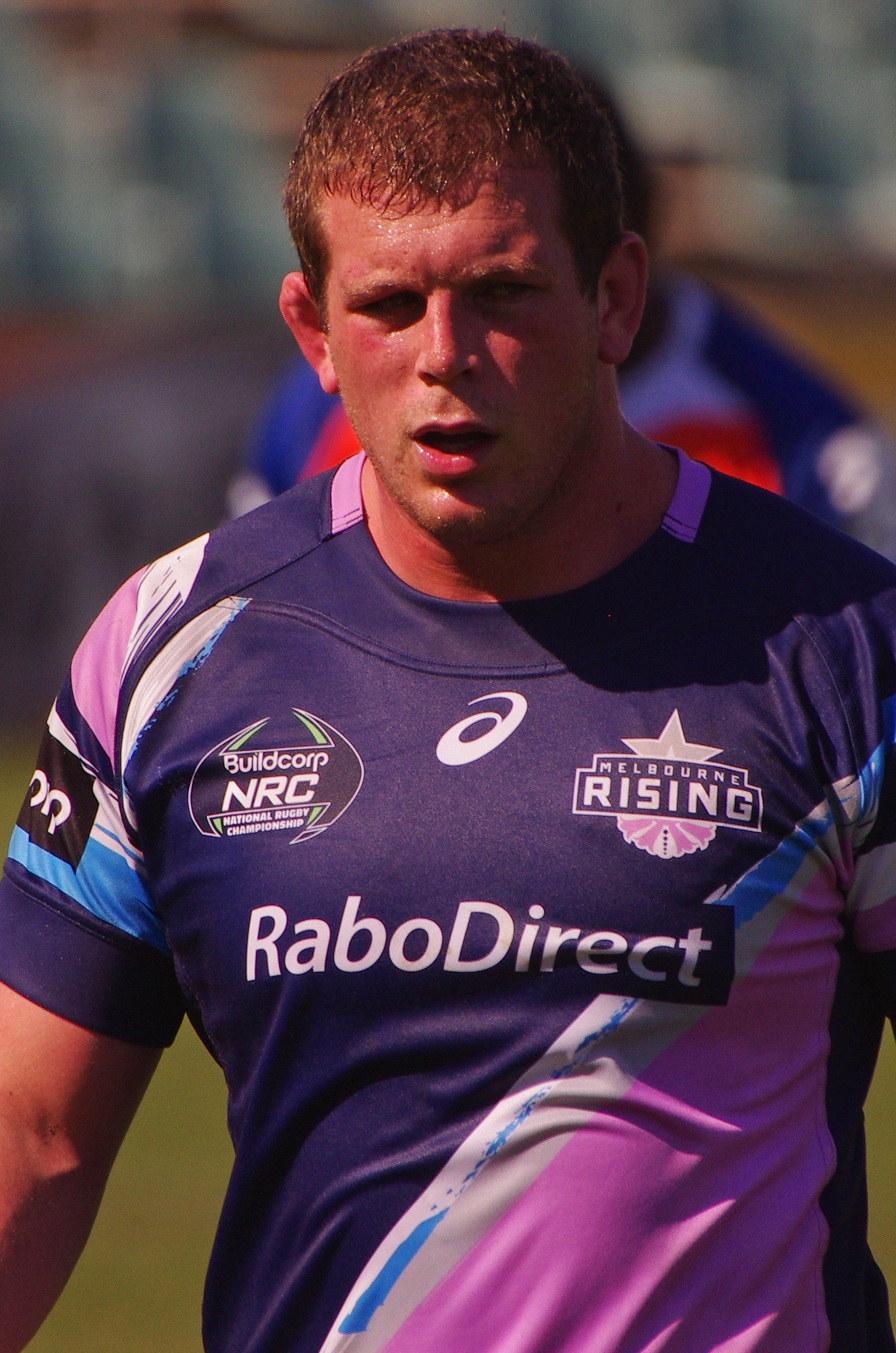
- Smith in 2014
- Born: Toby James Smith; 10 October 1988 (age 38) Kirwan, Queensland, Australia
- Height: 1.90 m (6 ft 3 in)
- Weight: 116 kg (256 lb; 18 st 4 lb)
- School: Hamilton Boys' High School

Rugby union career
- Position: Loosehead Prop
Senior career
Years	Team	Apps	(Points)
2008–2013	Waikato	50	(40)
2010–2013	Chiefs	37	(15)
2014–2017	Rebels	50	(15)
2014–2017	Melbourne Rising	14	(0)
2018–2019	Hurricanes	21	(0)
International career
Years	Team	Apps	(Points)
2008	New Zealand U20	3	(0)
2015–2017	Australia	6	(0)
2015–2016	Barbarians	4	(0)
Medal record
Men's rugby union
Representing Australia
Rugby World Cup
Silver medal – second place	2015 England	Squad

Toby James Smith (born 10 October 1988) is a retired Australian rugby union player. He played prop for the Chiefs, Rebels and Hurricanes in Super Rugby, and for the Australian national rugby union team internationally.

== Playing career ==
=== Waikato ===
Smith began his rugby career in New Zealand, debuting for ITM Cup team Waikato in 2008.

=== Chiefs ===
Smith played for the Chiefs in Super Rugby between 2010 and 2013, helping the team win back-to-back Super Rugby titles in 2012 and 2013.

=== Rebels & Wallabies ===
In 2014, Smith joined the Melbourne Rebels, and the Melbourne Rising of the National Rugby Championship. Smith was named in the Wallabies squad for the Rugby Championship in 2015, and was later named in the Wallabies' 31-man squad for the 2015 Rugby World Cup, despite being uncapped. On 5 September, he made his international debut coming off the bench against the United States in a Rugby World Cup Warm-up match. Smith notably appeared in the Wallabies' semi-final victory over Argentina, and received a silver medal after Australia's loss to the All Blacks in the final.

=== Hurricanes ===
In 2018, Smith returned to New Zealand, this time playing for the Wellington Super Rugby side the Hurricanes.

Following the 2019 rugby season, Smith, aged 31, announced his retirement from the game due to issues with concussion.

== Super Rugby statistics ==
As of 5 November 2017

Season	Team	Games	Starts	Sub	Mins	Tries	Cons	Pens	Drops	Points	Yel	Red
2010	Chiefs	6	3	3	273	1	0	0	0	5	0	0
2011	Chiefs	12	7	5	517	1	0	0	0	5	0	0
2012	Chiefs	8	4	4	384	1	0	0	0	5	0	0
2013	Chiefs	11	8	3	680	0	0	0	0	0	0	0
2014	Rebels	13	12	1	757	0	0	0	0	0	0	0
2015	Rebels	15	15	0	1054	1	0	0	0	5	0	0
2016	Rebels	14	14	0	966	1	0	0	0	5	0	0
2017	Rebels	8	7	1	498	1	0	0	0	5	0	0
2018	Hurricanes	13	13	0	705	0	0	0	0	0	0	0
2019	Hurricanes	8	7	1	427	0	0	0	0	0	0	0
Total		108	70	18	6261	6	0	0	0	30	0	0
