= Ah-mu Tuimalealiifano =

- Born: 30 May 1996 (age 30) Apia, Samoa
- Height: 176 cm (5 ft 9 in)
- Weight: 89 kg (14 st 0 lb; 196 lb)

Rugby union career
- Position: Wing
Senior career
Years	Team	Apps	(Points)
2016	Melbourne Rising	7	(6)
Super Rugby
Years	Team	Apps	(Points)
2017	Rebels	0	(0)

Ah-mu Tuimalealiifano (born 30 May 1996) is a Samoan-born, Australian rugby union player who played for the Rebels in the Super Rugby competition. His position of choice is wing.
