= Steve Cummins =

Australian rugby union player (born 1992)

- Full name: Steven Cummins
- Born: 29 March 1992 (age 34) Sydney, Australia
- Height: 2.02 m (6 ft 7 1/2 in)
- Weight: 119 kg (262 lb; 18 st 10 lb)
- School: Seven Hills High School / The Hills Sports High School, Sydney

Rugby union career
- Position: Lock
Amateur team(s)
Years	Team	Apps	(Points)
2012–2014	Eastwood		
Senior career
Years	Team	Apps	(Points)
2014	Eastern Province Kings	8	(0)
2015–2017	Melbourne Rising	21	(6)
2017–2020	Scarlets	47	(0)
2020 2021–2024	Pau	30	(5)
2024–2025	Dragons	6	(0)
2025	→ Scarlets (loan)	1	(0)
2025–2026	Urayasu D-Rocks	9	(0)
- Correct as of 10:22, 10 October 2025 (UTC)
Super Rugby
Years	Team	Apps	(Points)
2015–2017 2021	Rebels	30	(5)
- Correct as of 12 June 2021
International career
Years	Team	Apps	(Points)
2010	Australian Schools		
2011	Australia Under-19		
2012	Australia Under-20	2	(0)
- Correct as of 3 June 2014

Steven Cummins (born 29 March 1992) is an Australian professional rugby union player who plays as a lock for Welsh regional side Scarlets, on loan from Dragons RFC. He first joined the Scarlets in 2017, before joining Pau as a "medical joker" at the start of the 2020–21 season. He returned to Australia to play for Melbourne Rebels in the 2021 Super Rugby season, before playing another three seasons with Pau. In 2024, he joined Welsh side Dragons RFC on a two-year contract.

== Early life and rugby ==
Cummins was born in Sydney and attended The Hills Sports High, captaining their first XV in 2010. He was also named captain of the New South Wales All Schools team in the same year, as well as the Australian Schoolboy team.

In 2011, Cummins captained the Australia Under-19 side and he was a member of the Australia Under-20 team that played at the 2012 IRB Junior World Championship.

Cummins played in the Shute Shield competition with Eastwood, impressing coach John Manenti, who said:

Steve Cummins has established himself as a real hard worker with huge involvements at the tackle and breakdown areas.

In 2013, Cummins played for the Sydney-based Super Rugby franchise side the Waratahs' emerging side, Gen Blue in the Pacific Rugby Cup.

== Rugby career ==
=== Eastern Province Kings ===
On 3 June 2014, the Eastern Province Kings announced Cummins as one of three new signings prior to the 2014 Currie Cup Premier Division season. He joined them on a short-term contract for the remainder of 2014.

Two days later, Cummins was selected on the bench for the Eastern Province Kings side to face Wales during a tour match during a 2014 incoming tour. He came on as a late substitute, playing the last six minutes as the Kings suffered a 12–34 defeat.

Cummins started the opening match of the Currie Cup season, but was on the losing side as Western Province secured a 35–16 victory. He played in the first three matches of the season, as well as in the final four matches, including their match against the Pumas in the final round of the competition, where the Kings secured their only victory after nine successive defeats, beating the Pumas 26–25.

Cummins made a total of eight appearances in Eastern Province Kings colours during his short spell in Port Elizabeth.

=== Melbourne Rebels ===
On the same day that Cummins was announced as an EP Kings player, the Rebels also announced that Cummins signed a contract to join them as an Extended Playing Squad (EPS) member for the 2015 Super Rugby season. In early 2015, it was announced that Cummins had re-signed with the Melbourne Rebels for a further two years

=== Scarlets ===
Cummins signed with Welsh team Scarlets in November 2017.

== Super Rugby statistics ==
As of 12 June 2021

Season	Team	Games	Starts	Sub	Mins	Tries	Cons	Pens	Drops	Points	Yel	Red
2015	Rebels	2	0	2	73	0	0	0	0	0	1	0
2016	Rebels	3	1	2	102	0	0	0	0	0	0	0
2017	Rebels	15	15	0	1048	1	0	0	0	5	0	0
2021 AU	Rebels	7	3	4	245	0	0	0	0	0	0	0
2021 TT	Rebels	3	0	3	59	0	0	0	0	0	1	0
Total		30	19	11	1527	1	0	0	0	5	2	0
