= Pat Leafa =

NZ rugby union player

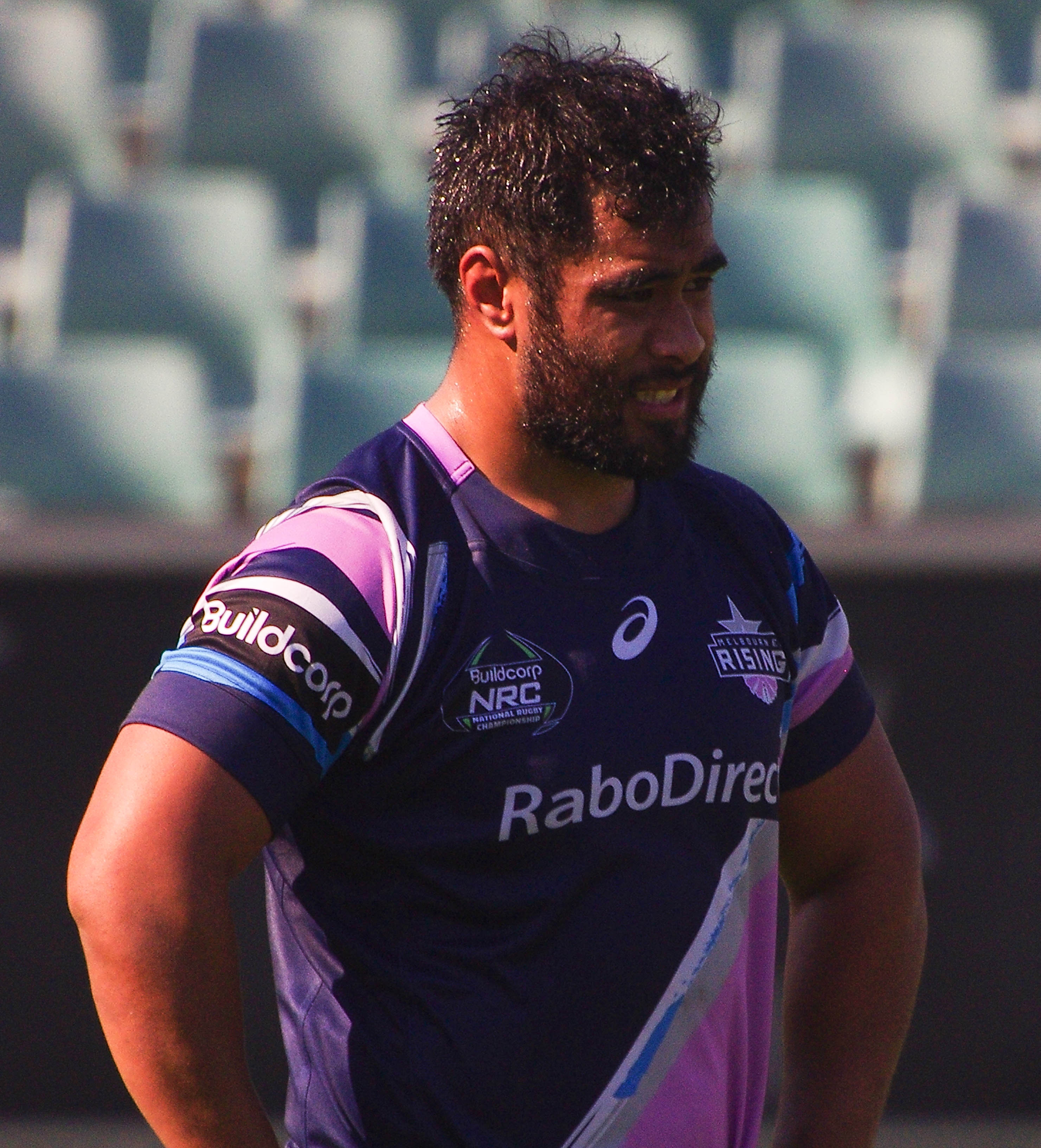
- Leafa in 2014
- Born: Patrick Leafa; 16 March 1989 (age 37) Auckland, New Zealand
- Height: 1.81 m (5 ft 11 1/2 in)
- Weight: 110 kg (17 st 5 lb; 243 lb)

Rugby union career
- Position: Hooker
Senior career
Years	Team	Apps	(Points)
2009–12	Marist Brothers Auckland		
2014–2016	Melbourne Rising	25	(25)
2017–	Vannes	7	(0)
- Correct as of 5 November 2017
Provincial / State sides
Years	Team	Apps	(Points)
2009	Auckland	1	(5)
2012–	Tuggeranong Vikings		
Super Rugby
Years	Team	Apps	(Points)
2013–2017	Rebels	51	(5)
- Correct as of 5 November 2017

Patrick Leafa is a professional rugby union player with the Melbourne Rebels. His preferred position is Hooker. Born and raised in New Zealand, Leafa played club rugby for Auckland Marist Brothers Old Boys where he captained the side and represented Auckland in the ITM cup.

He pursued his rugby career by moving to Australia and playing for the Tuggeranong Vikings in the ACT. He earned opportunities to play with the Brumby Runners - the Brumbies development squad.

He was signed by the Melbourne Rebels after a break out season that included winning player of the year for his club, the McDougall Medal for player of the tournament in 2012 and the ACT Griffins player of the year.

Leafa has been contracted by the Melbourne Rebels and offered a place in the Extended Player Squad.

== Super Rugby statistics ==
As of 5 November 2017

Season	Team	Games	Starts	Sub	Mins	Tries	Cons	Pens	Drops	Points	Yel	Red
2013	Rebels	1	0	1	10	0	0	0	0	0	0	0
2014	Rebels	16	10	6	743	1	0	0	0	5	0	0
2015	Rebels	16	16	0	1178	0	0	0	0	0	0	0
2016	Rebels	14	1	13	271	0	0	0	0	0	0	0
2017	Rebels	4	1	3	116	0	0	0	0	0	0	0
Total		51	28	23	2118	1	0	0	0	5	0	0
