= Jack Maddocks =

Australia international rugby union player

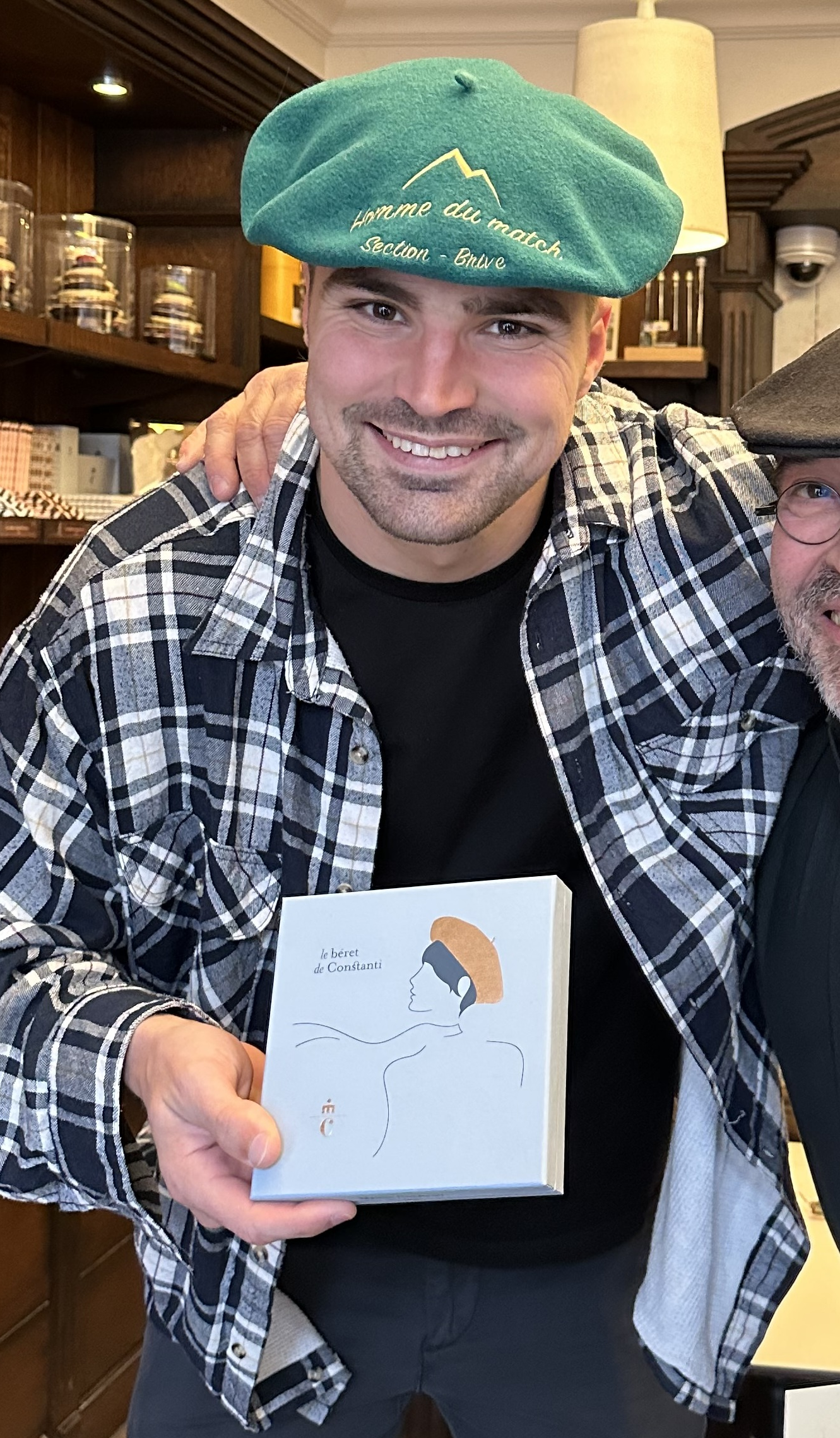
- Maddocks in 2022
- Full name: Jack Angus Kirkby Maddocks
- Born: 5 February 1997 (age 29) Sydney, New South Wales, Australia
- Height: 194 cm (6 ft 4 in)
- Weight: 96 kg (212 lb; 15 st 2 lb)
- School: Scots College

Rugby union career
- Position: Fullback
Amateur team(s)
Years	Team	Apps	(Points)
2015–2020	Eastern Suburbs	14	(20)
- Correct as of 19 August 2021
Senior career
Years	Team	Apps	(Points)
2017–2019	Melbourne Rising	8	(30)
2021–	Pau	63	(120)
- Correct as of 4 March 2022
Super Rugby
Years	Team	Apps	(Points)
2017–2019	Rebels	34	(95)
2020–2021	Waratahs	26	(45)
International career
Years	Team	Apps	(Points)
2016	Australia U20	5	(5)
2018	Australia	7	(5)
- Correct as of 4 March 2022
National sevens team
Years	Team		Comps
2019	Australia sevens		1

Jack Maddocks (born 5 February 1997) is an Australian professional rugby union player for the Section Paloise in Top 14. His preferred position is fullback, but he can also play on the wing.

== Career ==
Maddocks made his debut for the Rebels against the Blues as a starter in a 56–18 defeat for the Rebels, overcoming glandular fever to start the game.

Maddocks was selected as one of two development players within the Australian squad for the 2017 Wallabies tour.

Jack Maddocks left Australia in June 2021 to join Section Paloise, competing in the Top 14, on a two-season contract. In his first match for Pau, he fractured his thumb and was sidelined for six weeks. Later, after playing only four matches and scoring a try against Union Bordeaux Bègles in his second game, he suffered a thigh injury in late October, causing him to miss the rest of the 2021–22 Top 14 season. His absence was due to a rare and complex injury involving hematoma calcification, which had also ended his father's career.

Following a shortened first season due to his injury, Maddocks started the next season on the field against ASM Clermont during the second round of the 2022–23 Top 14 season. In the third round, he played a significant role in Pau's victory against Stade Toulousain by scoring two tries, earning him the Midi Olympique Player of the Week award. He gradually asserted himself as a leader in Pau's attack, returning to the level that had earned him international recognition. Regaining his form, Jack Maddocks established himself as one of Pau's offensive leaders.

In December 2022, Maddocks extended his contract with Pau for an additional two seasons.

== Super Rugby statistics ==
As of 16 June 2019

Season	Team	Games	Starts	Sub	Mins	Tries	Cons	Pens	Drops	Points	Yel	Red
2017	Rebels	5	2	3	170	0	0	0	0	0	0	0
2018	Rebels	15	15	0	1180	9	0	0	0	45	1	0
2019	Rebels	14	14	0	982	10	0	0	0	50	0	0
Total		34	31	3	2332	19	0	0	0	95	1	0
