= Jordy Reid =

Australian rugby union footballer (born 1991)

- Born: Jordy Reid; 3 October 1991 (age 35) Sydney, Australia
- Height: 1.88 m (6 ft 2 in)
- Weight: 106 kg (16 st 10 lb)

Rugby union career
- Position: Openside Flanker
- Current team: Manly
Senior career
Years	Team	Apps	(Points)
2015–2017	Melbourne Rising	17	(30)
2018−2020	Ealing Trailfinders	30	(45)
2020–	Gloucester	0	(0)
- Correct as of 11 March 2020
Super Rugby
Years	Team	Apps	(Points)
2013–2017	Rebels	43	(10)
- Correct as of 11 March 2020

Jordy Reid (born 3 October 1991) is an Australian rugby union footballer who plays in the Premiership Rugby as a flanker for Gloucester.

Reid made his Melbourne Rebels debut against the Waratahs on 1 March 2013 where he was a 77th minute replacement for Caderyn Neville. His performances during his debut season saw him sign a new contract which will keep him in Melbourne until 2015.

In the summer of 2018, Reid travelled to England to join Ealing Trailfinders in the RFU Championship from the 2018–19 season.

On 20 February 2020, Reid has signed for Gloucester in the Premiership Rugby from the 2020–21 season. He has since signed a contract extension.

== Super Rugby statistics ==
As of 6 November 2017

Season	Team	Games	Starts	Sub	Mins	Tries	Cons	Pens	Drops	Points	Yel	Red
2013	Rebels	9	2	7	272	0	0	0	0	0	1	0
2014	Rebels	3	0	3	92	0	0	0	0	0	0	0
2015	Rebels	10	3	7	412	0	0	0	0	0	0	0
2016	Rebels	15	12	3	933	2	0	0	0	10	0	0
2017	Rebels	4	4	0	266	0	0	0	0	0	0	0
Total		41	21	20	1975	2	0	0	0	10	1	0
