= Business studies =

Academic subject

Business studies, normally called business, is a field of study that deals with the principles of business, management, and economics. It combines elements of accountancy, finance, marketing, organizational studies, human resource management, and operations. Business studies is a broad subject, where the range of topics is designed to give the student a general overview of the various elements of running a business. The teaching of business studies is known as business education.

Countries in which the subject is taught under the name "business studies" include Mauritius, Oman, Bahrain, South Korea, Argentina, Australia, Bangladesh, Nepal, Brazil, Canada, Hong Kong, India, Ireland, Mexico, Singapore, Malaysia, Cambodia, Kenya, Poland, Malta, New Zealand, Nigeria, Pakistan, South Africa, Sri Lanka, Sweden, the United Kingdom, Namibia, Zimbabwe and Indonesia.

== United Kingdom ==
=== England ===
Business studies can be taken as part of the General Certificate of Secondary Education (GCSE) option for Year 9, Year 10, and Year 11 at secondary school. Also, they can be taken as part of a GCE Advanced Level (A-level) course in Year 12 and Year 13. It includes a range of subjects, which gives the student a general understanding of the various elements of running a business. Subjects covered include, but are not limited to: Business Organization, People in Business, Marketing, Operations & Production, Finance, and Strategic Management.

=== Scotland ===
Business management is an option for National 5 and Higher qualifications. Both National 5 and Higher exams cover Understanding business, People, Finance, Marketing, and operations.

=== Entry to UK Higher Education ===
The University of Cambridge considers business studies not to be a 'traditional academic subject'. However, taking business studies individually will not disadvantage students as long as it is identified as 'essential' or 'desirable' for the course being applied for. It is also suitable when applying for economics at university, if the college the candidate comes from does not offer the economics A-level individually.

== India ==
Business Studies in India is offered as a core subject in the Commerce stream at the senior secondary level (Class 11 and Class 12) under national and state education boards such as CBSE and ICSE and NIOS. It provides students with a foundational understanding of business principles, organizational structures, financial systems, and management practices. The curriculum includes topics such as Nature and Purpose of Business, Forms of Business Organisations, Business Services, Emerging Modes of Business, Principles of Management, Financial Markets, Marketing, and Consumer Protection. At the undergraduate level, Business Studies expands into specialized disciplines through programs like B.Com, BBA, and BBM, covering areas such as Accounting, Finance, Human Resource Management, Business Law, and Entrepreneurship. These subjects collectively prepare students for higher education in commerce and management, and for careers in business administration, financial services, and entrepreneurial ventures.

== Hungary ==
After finishing secondary school, students in Hungary have the option of either taking an accredited 2–4 semester business course and obtaining a certificate, or applying to college or university. Students can also take part in a 2-semester preparatory business course to increase their chances of being accepted to a university. Hungarian business education has been organized according to the Bologna system since 2006.

== Nepal ==
Business studies programs are widely offered in Nepal, at every +2 college and in colleges that offer A-Levels. Some universities (public and private) are offering business studies programs under the heading of Business Administration. Many programs often involve business studies and help students and others understand it.

== South Africa ==
In South Africa, Business Studies can be taken as an elective subject from a student's Grade 10 year through to their Grade 12 year; it is offered as part of the standard NSC, as well the IEB (see Matriculation in South Africa). As elsewhere, the syllabus covers a range of topics designed to give the student a general understanding of the various elements of running a business. Accountancy and Economics are offered as separate, and more technical, subjects.

Business Studies is taught at the higher secondary level (Classes 11 and 12) for students who have taken the Commerce Stream. According to the Central Board of Secondary Education, Business Studies is a compulsory subject for Commerce Stream students along with Economics and Accountancy. At the state board, the subject code for Business Studies is 054.

== See also ==
- Business administration
- Business economics
- Business education
