= France amateur national team =

France amateur national team may refer to:

- France national amateur football team
- France national amateur rugby union team
