= France Amateurs =

France Amateurs may refer to:

- France national amateur football team
- France national amateur rugby union team
