= Murray Douglas =

Scottish rugby union player

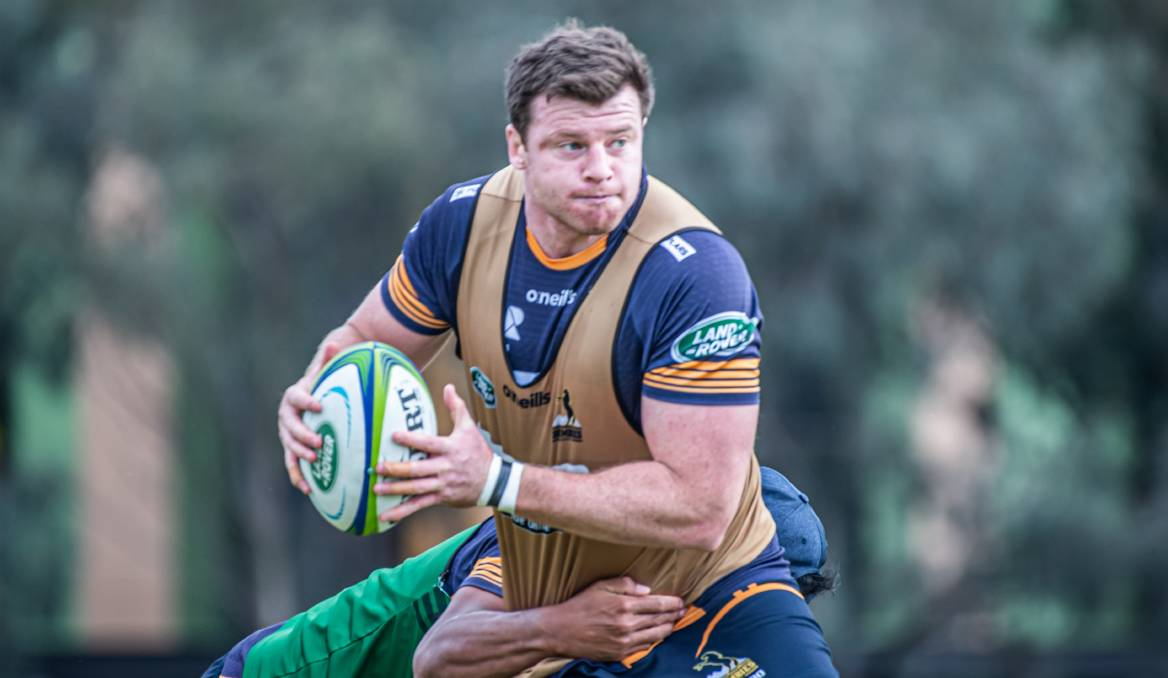
- Born: 27 October 1989 (age 37) Kirkcaldy, Scotland
- Height: 1.98 m (6 ft 6 in)
- Weight: 115 kg (18 st 2 lb)
- School: Balwearie High School
- University: University of Aberdeen

Rugby union career
- Position(s): Lock, Flanker
- Current team: Shizuoka Blue Revs
Amateur team(s)
Years	Team	Apps	(Points)
2007	Kirkcaldy	2	(0)
2007–2012	Aberdeen GSFP		
2012–2014	Heriot's		
Senior career
Years	Team	Apps	(Points)
2011–2012	Edinburgh Rugby	1	(0)
2015	Melbourne Rising	5	(0)
2017–2018	Northland	18	(10)
2017	Melbourne Rebels	3	(0)
2018	Hurricanes	7	(0)
2019	→ Edinburgh Rugby	5	(0)
2019–2020	Brumbies	23	(5)
2020–	Yamaha Júbilo	60	(40)

Murray Douglas (born 27 October 1989) is a Scottish professional rugby union player who currently plays for the Shizuoka Blue Revs in Japan Rugby League One. His position is lock or blindside flanker.

== Early life ==
Douglas was born and raised in Kirkcaldy, Fife where he attended Balwearie High School, and made his first team debut for Kirkcaldy RFC in 2007. After finishing high school, Douglas studied law at the University of Aberdeen where he played with Aberdeen GSFP RFC and captained the side in his final two years at university. The team gained promotion to the Scottish Premiership for the 2011–12 season. He made his debut for Edinburgh Rugby in a 38-13 defeat to Cardiff Blues in April 2012.

Upon graduating from the University of Aberdeen Douglas began training as a solicitor with law firm Pinsent Masons. He joined Heriot's Rugby Club for the 2013–14 season, winning the Scottish Cup after beating Glasgow Hawks RFC 31-10 in the final at Broadwood Stadium. During his time with Heriot's Rugby Club, Douglas captained the Scotland Club XV team in fixtures against Ireland Club XV and France national amateur rugby union team.

== Rugby career ==
Douglas relocated to Melbourne, Australia in 2014 to pursue his legal career. He joined local side Melbourne Harlequins playing in the Dewar Shield competition. He was selected to represent Melbourne Rising in the newly created National Rugby Championship competition for seasons 2015 and 2016.

Douglas gained a professional contract with the Melbourne Rebels for the 2017 Super rugby season after impressing whilst on a trial during pre-season training. He made his debut for the Rebels against the Chiefs as a late replacement for Culum Retallick in a 24-14 defeat for the Rebels.

He then moved to New Zealand after accepting a contract with Northland Rugby Union for the 2017 and 2018 Mitre 10 Cup. His performances throughout the 2017 Mitre 10 Cup earned him a contract with Wellington based Super Rugby franchise Hurricanes (rugby union) for the 2018 season.

Upon the conclusion of the 2018 Mitre 10 Cup season, Douglas accepted a two-year contract with Canberra based Super Rugby franchise ACT Brumbies. He became a mainstay in the match day squad at ACT Brumbies during his stay, predominantly coming off the bench in the 2019 Super Rugby season before starting every match in the second row in a dominant Brumbies pack in 2020. Douglas played in the ACT Brumbies 28-23 victory over the Queensland Reds in the Super Rugby AU final at GIO Stadium on 19 September 2020.

During the 2019 Rugby World Cup Douglas joined Edinburgh Rugby on a short-term deal which coincided with the Super Rugby off-season. He made five appearances for the Capital side before a neck injury prematurely curtailed his time with the club.

Douglas signed a two-year contract with Japanese club Yamaha Jubilo ahead of 2021 Top League season.

== Super Rugby statistics ==
As of 19 September 2020

Season	Team	Games	Starts	Sub	Mins	Tries	Cons	Pens	Drops	Points	Yel	Red
2017	Rebels	3	1	2	106	0	0	0	0	0	0	0
2018	Hurricanes (rugby union)	7	2	5	216	0	0	0	0	0	0	0
2019	ACT Brumbies	11	1	10	242	1	0	0	0	0	0	0
2020	ACT Brumbies	12	12	0	823	0	0	0	0	0	1	0
Total		33	16	17	1387	1	0	0	0	0	1	0
