= North College Thessaloniki =

North College of Thessaloniki
- Motto: "Meis viribus confido"
- Motto in English: "I trust my abilities"
- Type: Independent Liberal Arts Studies
- Active: 1975–2009
- President: Dr Constantinos Rizopoulos
- Vice-president: Professor Maria Argyriou
- Undergraduates: Yes
- Postgraduates: Yes
- Location: Thessaloniki, Central Macedonia, Greece
- Campus: Urban Αrea, Suburb
- Website: http://www.northcollege.gr/ http://www.north.edu.gr defunct

== Statement ==
In late 2009, North College of Thessaloniki ceased its 34-year-operation due to the Greek economic crisis. This affected the degree completion of many enrolled students. Despite this, North College's reputation still remains high. This is due to its graduates, many of whom have succeeded in achieving substantial careers professionally and academically in Greece and overseas.

== Historical review ==
North College of Thessaloniki, Greece, was established in 1975 as "Makedonikos Ekpedeftikos Organismos – MEO" (Macedonian Educational Organisation). In late 70s the MEO was renamed North College.

North College was one of the first independent institutions of Higher Education in Greece, dedicated to teaching undergraduate and postgraduate academic courses.

Since its establishment, the North College of Thessaloniki operated as an Independent, non-profit-making, Liberal Studies College until 2009, under the legislative decree of the Hellenic Republic, 9/9.10.35.

In 1978, in co-operation with American academic institutions and in light of the growing demands of the local employment market, the North College of Thessaloniki developed a new academic system.

North College began its operation according to the trimester mode and on the basis of a clear modular system.

Until 1993 all courses led to a degree after three years of studies, namely after the completion of a nine-trimester-course.

== Academic system ==
In 1990, North College initiated a policy of approaching the British Educational System in order to comply with the European standards of education. This policy included close contacts and co-operation with British educational institutions. In 1990s, the college moved rapidly towards a European educational philosophy, in view of the European Unification. In this context, North College Thessaloniki adopted the British educational system. In 1995, North College changed its nine-trimester-mode of studies into eight-semester-mode.

== Academic and international partners ==
Specifically, the following collaborations have had a catalytic effect on the North College's operating system:

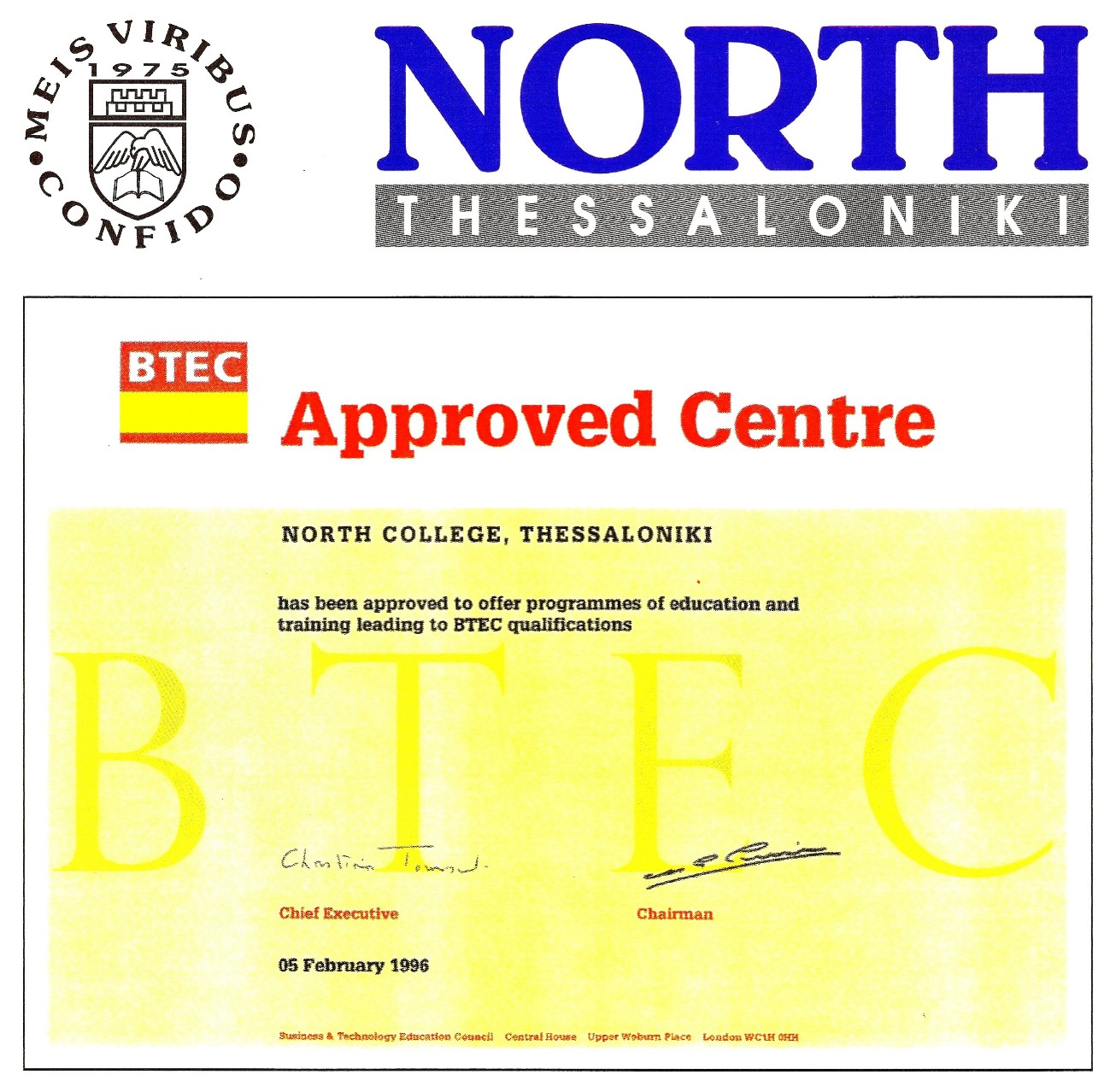
North College of Thessaloniki, BTEC Approved Center Certificate 1996

- The BTEC/Edexcel Foundation provision which had been operating in North College with remarkable success (1990). North College was the first institution in Greece to achieve BTEC Approved Assessment Centre status (1996). Thus, North College had been providing an autonomous two-year-long complete framework of higher education (1995). At that time, BTEC validation enabled North College to provide HND courses.
- The links with the University of Abertay Dundee, U.K. (1997). North College had been validated by the U.A.D. for the delivery of BA(Hons) in Business Studies and BSc(Hons) in Computer Studies at undergraduate level.
- In 1994, North College had been franchised by the U.A.D. for the delivery of MBA and MBA/Marketing and PgD/MSc in Software Engineering.

== Academic innovations ==
North College was the first and only Institution of Higher Education in Greece, both in the Independent and/or Public sector, which introduced and operated Journalism Studies Courses in 1977. That innovation enabled first graduates students to be fully and unconditionally accepted by American and British Universities for post-graduate studies. Until 1990 the Greek state Universities ignored the Media Studies courses. Since then, the dominant notion was that the media professions were, merely, skill-oriented and thus, it was not necessary for journalists etc. to study for a degree. All the media professionals were self-taught or graduates of irrelevant degrees such as lawyers, mathematicians, psychologists or, even just, high school graduates.

== Location ==
North College resided in Thessaloniki, Greece's second largest city after Athens. Thessaloniki has a population of about 1.2 million and is heavily involved in trade and services.

== Organisation and curriculum ==
The college offered educational programmes in Business Studies, Division of Computing, Art & Design, Psychology & Counselling, Applied Linguistics & Foreign Languages, Mass Media & Communications.

The college was oriented towards the development of Higher Education programmes, research and related services in Greece as well as overseas.

North College internationalised its education in Europe and in the United States by joint projects:

- Offered courses validated by British universities
- Participated in European Union educational and research initiatives
- Undertook joint quality monitoring, research and development
- Contributed to development programs with Central and Eastern Europe
- Developed and applied the UK and European Credit Transfer System between Universities
- Promoted staff and student exchanges

The North College of Thessaloniki used to offer 37 bachelor and 17 master's degrees in School of Business & Computing, School of Art & Design, and School of Humanities & Social Sciences.

The United Kingdom remained and still remains the most popular choice of North College graduates to seek for post-graduate studies.

== Governance ==
- The Board of Governors
- The Course Management Team
- The Course Board
- The Examination & Award Board
- The Quality Standards Committee

== Social activities ==
Clubs, Groups and Societies of North College created by students who shared the same enthusiasm and the same preference for Social, Sports, Cultural, Arts, Performing and Media activities. They were strongly encouraged to develop new plans and initiatives as well as to participate and be involved in such activities, cultivating their social skills.

Various Clubs, Societies and Groups used to operate in North College from typical athletic clubs for sports like Soccer, Basketball, Volleyball, Aerobic to some more unusual like the Art Therapy Group, which was founded by students of the Department of Psychology and was open and flexible to include members from other study areas.

== Alumni ==
The Alumni Association of North College operates as an independent legal entity recognized by statute by the competent authorities of the Greek State, in order to ensure communication between the alumni of the college. Besides, one of the main activities of the Alumni Association of North College is the continuous mutual information for the development of its members, but also the interconnections both within the organized structure, and between the different actors and networks of common interest.

== The Campuses ==
During the academic year of 1992-93 (until 2005), the college moved to its new facilities outside the city of Thessaloniki, with purpose-built classrooms, that were better equipped, bigger and more numerous. At that time North College owned three Inner City Campuses (City Annex, and Metropolitan Campus) and one out-city campus (Ioannina City).

The last Metropolitan Campus Building of the college was presented during the Pan-Hellenic Architecture Exhibition organized by HELEXPO in November 2005.
