= Sam Brodie =

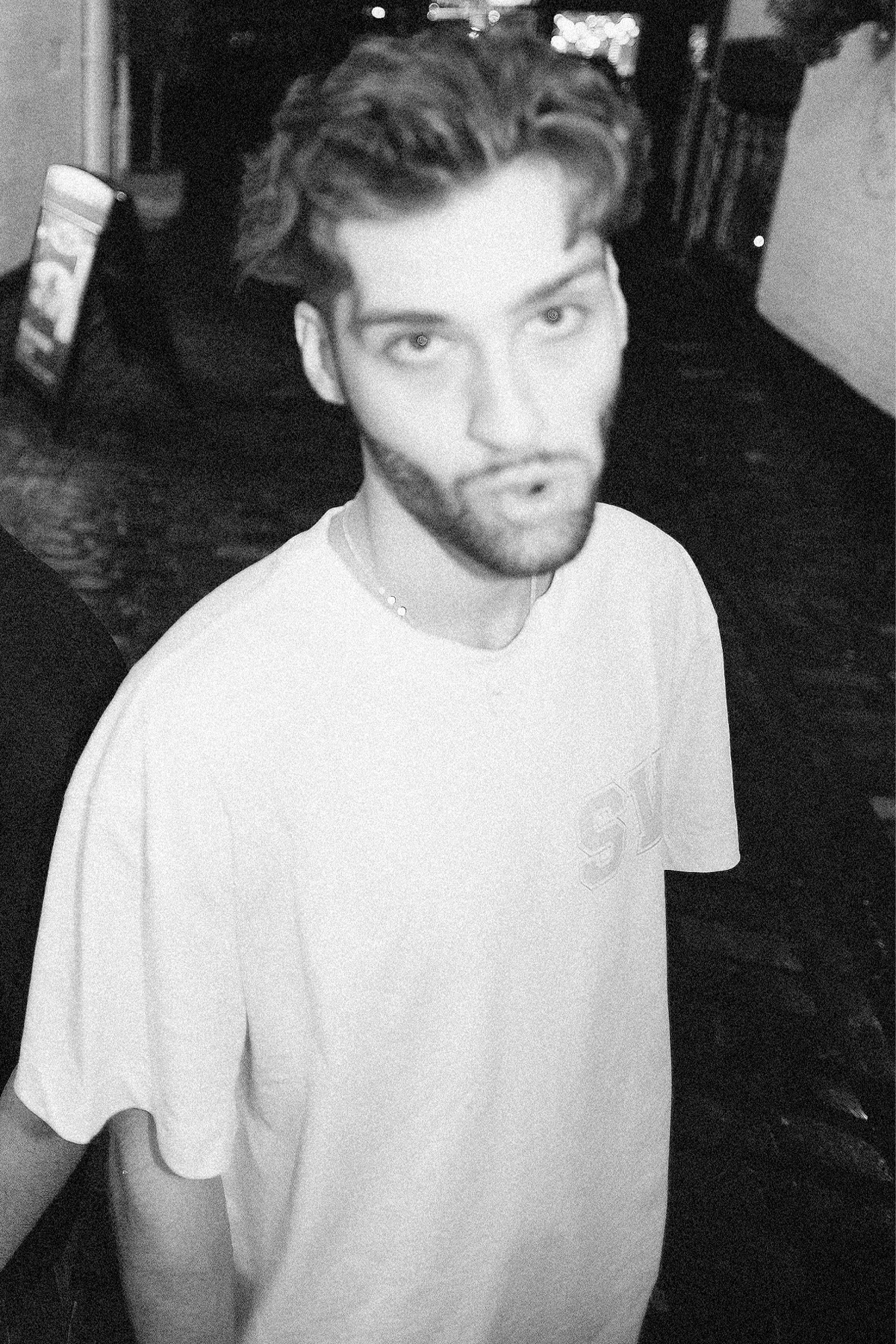

Background information
- Born: Sam Ian Brodie; 4 July 2001 (age 24); Kirkcaldy, Scotland
- Genres: Hip hop
- Occupations: Record producer; Singer-Songwriter
- Instruments: Drums; Guitar; Piano
- Years active: 2016–present
- Label: Sony Music Publishing
- Website: https://www.sambrodie.uk/

Sam Brodie (born 4 July 2001) is a Scottish record producer and singer-songwriter from Kirkcaldy. Brodie's music has been described as blending indie rock, pop-punk, and hip-hop influences.

== Early life ==
Brodie was born in Kirkcaldy in 2001. He attended Balwearie High School and is self-taught in music production, starting in 2016 in his bedroom. Brodie later attended Kingston University and graduated with a Bachelor of Arts in Audio Production. He first uploaded his demos to YouTube and SoundCloud, where he found an early audience for his work.

== Musical career ==
Brodie first became known as a producer on YouTube, before earning a 50/50 partnership publishing deal with Sony Music Publishing & Umbrella Songs Publishing at the age of 21.

In 2021, Brodie performed at King Tut's Summer Nights festival, a well-known Glasgow venue known for showcasing new talent.

In 2023, Brodie collected IMPALA gold, double silver and silver awards for his work as a songwriter on the album '12' by Russian rapper FACE.

In 2024, he topped the Billboard Luxembourg songs chart, debuting at number one for his work as a songwriter on the song 'No Use' by American rapper and singer 03 Greedo, becoming the first Scottish record producer to have a Billboard No. 1 rap hit.

Brodie has produced for other artists such as The Last Artful, Dodgr, and Lil Bean. He has also worked with producers Teddy Riley and Cubeatz.

== Musicianship ==
Brodie creates instrumentals using drums, guitars and pianos. He also uses manipulated vocal samples, melodies, and lyrics as part of his production style.

2020 Scottish Album of the Year Award winner NOVA described Brodie as a melodic trap artist with pop influences and a cool style.

== Discography ==
=== Studio albums ===
- If Anything Changed, It Wasn't Me. (2023)

== Significant works ==
=== Singles ===
- CHLOBOCOP – PRESiDENT FREESTYLE (2018)
- FACE – БЕДНОМУ (2019)
- The Last Artful, Dodgr – Asi9ine (2022)
- Shady Blu, 03 Greedo – No Use (2023)
- Lil Bean – Somewhere in the Darkness (2023)
- Lil Bean, ZayBang, Lil Yee – TRY FOR ONCE (2023)
- Lil Bean, ZayBang, Lil Yee – Free The Innocent (2023)
- Lil Bean – nun bigger than the family (2024)

=== Albums ===
- FACE – 12 (2019)
- The Last Artful, Dodgr – Hits Of Today (2022)
- Lil Bean – 4THECULTURE2 (2023)
- Lil Bean and Zay Bang – Benzes & Trackhawks (2023)
- Lil Bean – BACK TO THE BASICS 2 (2024)

=== EPs ===
- CHLOBOCOP – LiL RED RIDIN' FROM the HOOD (2018)
