= Matriculation in South Africa =

Final year of high school; university entrance

In South Africa, matriculation (or matric) is the final year of high school and the qualification received on graduating from high school, and the minimum university entrance requirements. The first formal examination was conducted in South Africa under the University of the Cape of Good Hope in 1858.

In general usage, the school-leaving exams, which are government-administered, are known as the "matric exams"; by extension, students in the final year of high school (grade 12) are known as "matriculants" or, more commonly, "matrics". Once the Matric year has been passed, students are said to have "matriculated".

== Qualification ==
Officially, the qualification obtained at the end of secondary schooling is the National Senior Certificate, and the school-leaving examinations are the "Senior Certificate Examinations". The National Senior Certificate can be completed through either the Department of Education or the Independent Examination Board, both of which lead to a school-leaving qualification that allows learners to apply for further studies at universities, colleges, or seek employment. Students who fulfill certain requirements (an achievement rating of 4 (50%–59%) or better in four (4) designated subjects) in their Senior Certificate results receive a Matriculation Endorsement/Bachelor's Pass on their certificates; this endorsement is the minimum requirement for admission to a bachelor's degree at any South African university, set by the Department of Basic Education. Students applying to a South African university with foreign school qualifications can obtain a "Matriculation Exemption" to show that they meet the same standards.

This multiple meaning can lead to confusion; for example, the statement that a person "passed matric" or "has their matric" may mean either that they received a Senior Certificate (i.e., they finished high school) or specifically that they received a Senior Certificate with Matriculation Endorsement (i.e., they are eligible to enter university).

South African universities do not set their own entrance examinations, although many use standardized entrance tests of linguistic, numerical and mathematical ability, called the National Benchmark Tests, split into the AQL Test (Academic and Quantitative Literacy) and the Mathematics Test.

Before the 1990s, the standard Matric Certificate with Endorsement was worded as "Examination result – Passed with full exemption". This wording meant that the candidate passed their NSC exams with exemption from entrance exams when applying for University entrance. As of 2005, the new passing standards are Certificate, Diploma, and Bachelor.

== National Senior Certificate ==
The National Senior Certificate or NSC is the current matriculation (matric) certificate, with grade 12 as the matriculation grade. The NSC, previously known as the Further Education and Training Certificate or FETC, replaced the Senior Certificate effectively in 2008, having been phased in with grade 10 in 2006.

=== Curriculum ===
Students study at least seven subjects: two of the twelve official South African languages one of which must be at "home language" level, either Mathematics or Mathematical Literacy, Life Orientation, and three elective subjects. Students have the option of either taking the NSC (National Senior Certificate) or the NCV (National Certificate Vocational).

=== Standards ===
Subjects are taken on the same level – the earlier higher/standard grade split is obsolete. The three pass levels have different requirements. The higher certificate requires 40% or higher in the home language as well as in two other subjects and at least 30% in three other subjects. Students who pass the matric with a higher certificate level cannot enroll for a university degree nor a diploma at any institution of higher learning. The mean mark in any subject is approximately 55. Only a small proportion of candidates score an 'A' in any subject (from as little as 2% to a maximum of about 10% in subjects taken by highly select groups). A further 8–15% are likely to gain a 'B' and about 20–25% achieve a 'C' grade. The National Senior Certificate is a group certificate and records an aggregate mark.

The Department of Basic Education (DBE) sets national education policy, curriculum standards, and assessment regulations for South Africa. The DBE also administers the National Senior Certificate (NSC) for public schools through its nine provincial education departments, which manage candidate registration, exam delivery, marking, and the release of results.

South Africa also has two independent examination bodies accredited by Umalusi: the Independent Examinations Board (IEB) - which serves independent schools, and the South African Comprehensive Assessment Institute (SACAI)- which provides NSC assessments mainly for home-school, online-school, and distance-learning candidates. Although they develop their own examination papers, both bodies must comply with DBE policy and Umalusi quality standards. Together, the DBE, IEB, and SACAI ensure that all NSC examinations—whether written in public schools, independent schools, or via distance-learning pathways—meet national curriculum and quality requirements.

=== Subject requirements ===
Students study at least 7 subjects: 4 compulsory and 3–4 optional. All subjects are set at one grade only and are no longer set at Higher or Standard Grade. Not all schools offer the full range of elective subjects as listed here. Each school may offer subjects specific to its academic orientation. For example, agriculture schools will offer agriculture-oriented subjects whereas technical schools will offer practical and mechanical-oriented subjects.

==== Group A: Fundamentals (compulsory) ====
Learners must study 4 compulsory subjects:

- Two of the official languages of South Africa (at least one must be at the home language level):
  - Afrikaans
  - English
  - Ndebele
  - Northern Sotho
  - Southern Sotho
  - Swazi
  - Tsonga
  - Tswana
  - Venda
  - Xhosa
  - Zulu
- Mathematics, Mathematical Literacy, or Technical Mathematics
- Life Orientation

==== Group B: Electives ====
Learners must also study at least 3 subjects from the following:

- Accounting
- Afrikaans SAL
- Agricultural Management Practices
- Agricultural Sciences
- Agricultural Technology
- Business Studies
- Civil Technology
- Computer Applications Technology
- Consumer Studies
- Dance Studies
- Design
- Dramatic Arts
- Economics
- Electrical Technology
- Engineering Graphic and Design
- English SAL
- Geography
- History
- Hospitality Studies
- Information Technology
- Life Science
- Marine Science
- Mechanical Technology
- Music
- Ndebele SAL
- Physical Science
- Religion Studies
- Sepedi SAL
- Sesotho SAL
- Setswana SAL
- Siswati SAL
- Technical Science
- Tourism
- Visual Arts
- Xhosa SAL
- Zulu SAL

=== Life Orientation ===
Life Orientation (colloquially abbreviated as "LO") has been introduced into the senior high school phase as an examination subject and is designed to cover non-academic skills needed in everyday life such as:

- World of Work, helping learners find guidance in their choice of career and prepare them for the working world.
- Health Education covers topics such as sex education, HIV/Aids, pregnancy, etc.
- Physical Education, physical exercise and training (done on a separate basis but eventually forms part of the Life Orientation mark).
- Religious Education, as mandated by the South African Schools Act, students may request to be exempted from classes about specific religions (i.e., Bible Studies). Those who do so remain obligated to attend the general Religious Studies class.
- Citizenship and Responsibility, explain to students their rights and duties as citizens.

=== Assessment ===
There are three types of subjects:

==== General subjects ====
- An end-of-year examination: 75% of the total mark
- Portfolio (Continuous Assessment): 25% of the total mark

==== Practical subjects ====
- An end-of-year examination: 50% of the total mark
- Portfolio (Continuous Assessment): 25% of the total mark
- Practical component: 25% of the total mark

==== Language subjects ====
- An end-of-year examination: 50% of the total mark
- Portfolio (Continuous Assessment): 25% of the total mark
- Oral Examination: 25% of the total mark

Continuous Assessment (CASS) includes all the tests, examinations, tasks, activities, orals and projects done throughout the year. Results are usually out of 400 marks.

=== Level system (1–7) ===
- Level 7: 80–100% (Outstanding achievement)
- Level 6: 70–79% (Meritorious achievement)
- Level 5: 60–69% (Substantial achievement)
- Level 4: 50–59% (Moderate achievement)
- Level 3: 40–49% (Adequate achievement)
- Level 2: 30–39% (Elementary achievement)
- Level 1: 0–29% (Not achieved – Fail)

=== Language compensation ===
Language compensation attempts to adjust for the difficulties faced by students whose mother tongue is neither English nor Afrikaans. It is described by several sources:

- "To the final mark is added the language compensation, which is 5% of the mark attained by the candidate for all non-language subjects, for candidates whose mother tongue is not English or Afrikaans. The 5% compensates learners for the disadvantage suffered by these candidates being instructed in a language that is not their mother tongue."
- "The compensation applies to learners whose first language is neither English nor Afrikaans and who offer an African language as their first language. They receive an additional 5% on their non-language subjects. The measure was first introduced in 1999 by the South African Certification Council."
- Dr. Sizwe Mabizela, Chairperson of Council, Umalusi has provided a further explanation: "This is the most misunderstood concept in this country. In terms of the policy on language compensation, learners who offer an African language as Home Language and do not offer Afrikaans or English as Home language qualify for a 5% language compensation on the mark they have obtained in a non-language subject. For example a learner who obtains a mark of zero (0) out of 300 will obtain 5% of zero (which is zero) for language compensation; a learner who obtains 10 out of 300 will receive 5% of 10, which is 0,5 marks, for language compensation; a learner who obtains 100 out of 300 marks will obtain an additional 5 marks for language compensation."

This kind of compensation provides a significant impact at the upper end of the scale, affecting those applying for admission to university. For example, a qualifying learner obtaining 95% would receive an official grade of $95 \times 1.05 = 99.75%$ (which rounds to 100%). A learner obtaining 40% would receive an official grade of $40 \times 1.05 = 42.0%$.

== University entrance ==
In addition to minimum grades required in each subject, universities either set their entrance tests and/or use the National Benchmark Tests (NBT). To study for a bachelor's degree at a South African university requires that the applicant has at least an NSC endorsed by Umalusi, with a pass of 30% in the chosen university's language of learning and teaching, as well as achievement ratings of 4 (50%) or higher for any other 4 20-credit subjects (there is no longer a list of "designated subjects" that count).

== See also ==
- Education in South Africa
- List of secondary education systems by country § South Africa
- Independent Examinations Board
- Twelfth grade
