= Balwearie High School =

Coordinates: 56.10218°N 3.16992°W

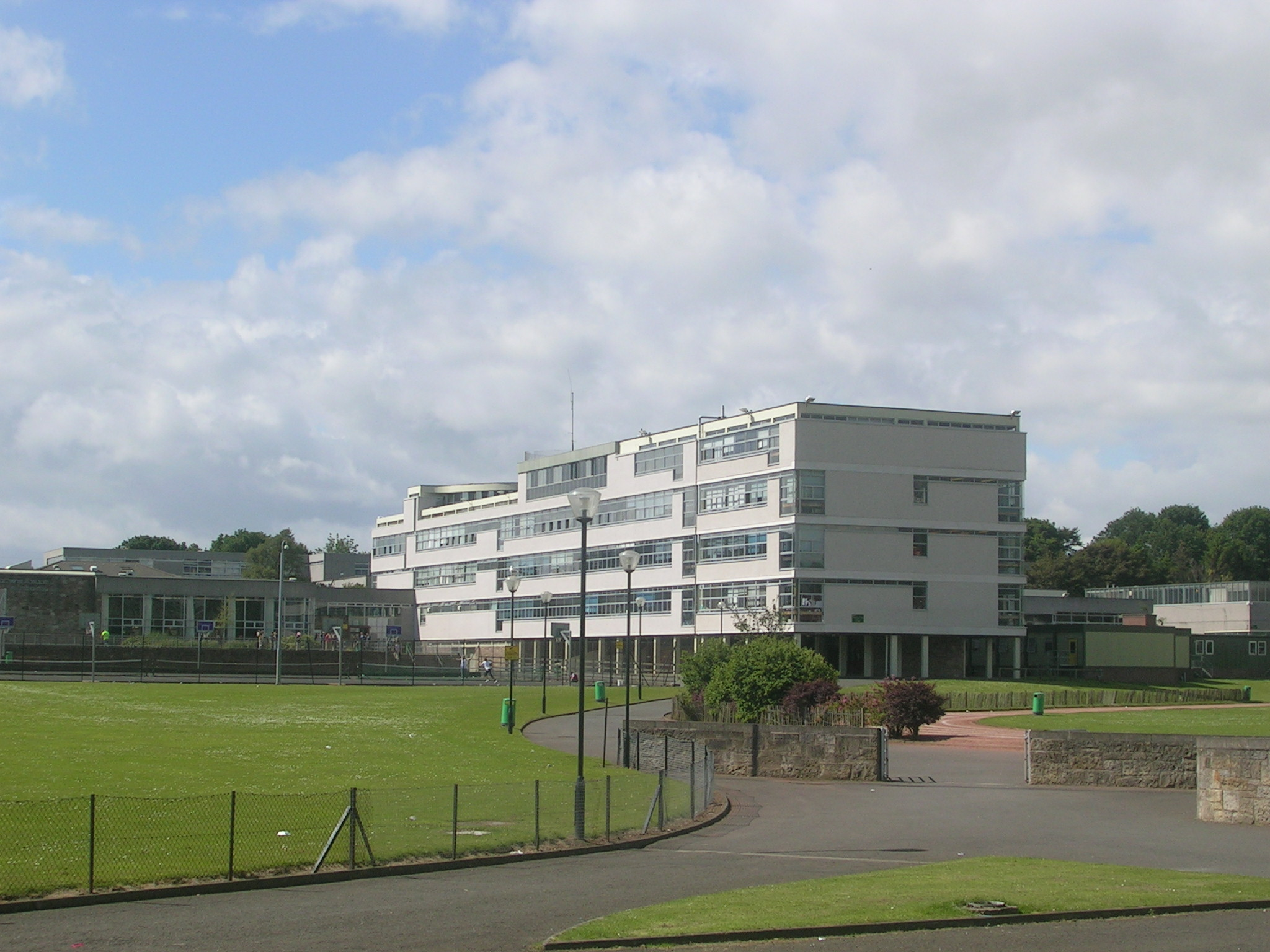
- Balwearie High School – C Block

Location
- Balwearie Gardens; Kirkcaldy, Fife, KY2 5LY; Scotland

Information
- Type: Secondary School
- Motto: "To Strive, To Seek"
- Established: 16 November 1964 (junior secondary); 1972 (secondary school)
- Rector: Alison Mitchell
- Gender: Mixed
- Age: 11 to 18
- Enrolment: 1547 (September 2016)
- Houses: Grange, Kilrie, Piteadie, Tyrie
- Colours: Blue, Black, Grey & Red
- Grades: S1-S6
- Website: balweariehigh.co.uk

Balwearie High School is a non-denominational comprehensive secondary school at the west end of Kirkcaldy in Scotland. Balwearie serves around 1600 pupils aged from 11 to 18 and includes a Department of Additional Support (DAS for short) for children with Additional Support Needs.

== History and facilities ==
The school was initially a junior secondary school in 1964, before becoming a comprehensive school in 1972. It was designed by architect Gavin Haveron McConnell and, in 2014, received Listed status (Category B) from Historic Environment Scotland for being among the very best examples of school building of the post-war building period in Scotland, closely following Modernist design principles and marking a clear break from the more formal designs of the inter-war period and 1950s. It originally comprised two blocks, named C Block and T Block. The J block was added a few years later, housing a library and maths, geography, science, technical, and computing classrooms. This and the C Block is conjoined via a bridge corridor through the L (library) Block. There are also detached hut units housing a small number of classrooms. The school has two cafeterias – the L Block is used by first, second, and sixth year pupils; the C Block is used by third, fourth and fifth year pupils – as well as a breakfast club.

In January 1997, a radiator fault caused a fire in the school's music department, which is situated at the top floor of the C block. The fire began in the early hours of the morning following the school's 'Burns Night' celebrations. It was extinguished rapidly by the local fire brigade. The music department suffered the most through fire and water damages; however, each level beneath the third floor suffered fire damage as well. The school was closed for several days with students being allowed back in stages, with the senior students, who were in the final preparations for May exams, returning first.

There was a second fire on 29 June 2009 in the Games Hall and community use cafe shortly before 5pm; the damaged building was deemed safe, and the awards ceremony due that evening went ahead as planned. Pupils attended school the following day as usual.

== Houses ==
=== Current houses ===
The houses at Balwearie are named after various farms located on the outskirts of Kirkcaldy.

House	Colour
Grange	
Kilrie	
Piteadie	
Tyrie	

=== Former houses ===
House	Colour	Year of Abolition	Comments
Stenhouse		2015	Stenhouse was a separate house for the school's DAS (Department of Additional Support), however in 2015, Stenhouse was abolished and pupils from the DAS joined the rest of the school in one of the other five houses. The fire assembly point bearing the houses' name remains on the bank of the running track with the other assembly points for year groups.
Raith		2019	Raith was fully absorbed into the remaining four school houses post-summer holidays of 2019.

== Rectors of Balwearie High School ==
Rector	Start of office	End of office	Duration (years)	Comments
Tom Elder	1964	1970	6	Rector when the school was officially opened.
Oliver McLauchlan	1970	1988	18	Successor to Tom Elder.
Gordon MacKenzie OBE	1988	2010	22	In 2001 he was appointed an OBE for services to Secondary Education and is also currently the school's longest-serving rector.
Dr James More	2010	2017	7	
Neil McNeil	2017	2023	6	
Alison Mitchell	2023	(ongoing)	(ongoing)	

== Catchment area ==
The school's catchment area covers much of the south and west of Kirkcaldy, as well as Kinghorn, Burntisland and Auchtertool. Balwearie's associated primary schools are Auchtertool, Burntisland, Dunnikier, Kinghorn, Strathallan and Kirkcaldy West.

== Curriculum ==
A high staying on rate is reflected in large numbers gaining employment, training or Further or Higher Education.

The school originally won a Charter Mark Award for excellence in public service in 2001, this has now been renewed. The school also has the Schools Curriculum Award.

Balwearie is known for having a large sciences department as well as a STEM programme started by former rector Dr James More which involves 6th year sciences students visiting catchment primary schools to encourage future Balwearie pupils to take an interest in science.

Recently pupils in an Alternative Curriculum Group won a Fife Excellence Award and the magazine club won the Scotsman/Royal Bank of Scotland 'Design a Newspaper'. More recently, a Young Enterprise company in the school scooped two of the three trophies.

The school is also part of the Erasmus Programme, going on over the two sessions of 2015/16 and 2016/17.

== School Board and Parent Council ==
Balwearie is supported by a School Board and a Parent Council – the Balwearie Parent & Carer Voice. The Balwearie Parent & Carer Voice provides volunteers for many of the school's social events, including the biennial School Musical.

== Notable former pupils ==
- Sam Brodie, musician
- Colin Cameron, footballer
- Stephen Dick, hockey player who represented Great Britain in the Beijing Olympics
- Murray Douglas, professional rugby player, Brumbies
- Sharon Small, actress
- Lewis Stevenson, footballer
- David Torrance, Scottish National Party MSP
- Ben Sandilands, Paralympic athlete

== Motto ==
The school's motto is "To Strive, to Seek", taken from the final line of Tennyson's Ulysses. The line ends "...to find, and not to yield."

== HMIe inspection ==
In February 2008 the school underwent an inspection by Her Majesty's Inspectorate of Education (HMIE).

In October/November 2017, a team of inspectors from Education Scotland visited Balwearie High School.
