= Independent Examinations Board =

South African examination board

Independent Examinations Board (IEB)
- Formation: 1988
- Location: South Africa
- Official language: English, Afrikaans
- Website: https://www.ieb.co.za/

The Independent Examinations Board (IEB) is a South African independent assessment agency which offers examinations for various client schools, mostly private schools. It is most prominent in setting examinations for the school-leaving National Senior Certificate (NSC) examination, a qualification that replaced the Senior Certificate and Further Education and Training Certificate. The IEB is accredited by Umalusi, the Council for Quality Assurance in General and Further Education and Training, and serves as a recognised assessment body.

== History ==
The IEB was established in 1988, replacing the Joint Matriculation Board as an alternative examination body that was for schools not affiliated with state assessment agencies. Its main goal was to offer high-quality assessments to schools that supported non-racial policies, during a time when many independent schools wanted alternatives to state-run exam boards. Initially focused on providing an inclusive examination option, the IEB has since expanded its role, now offering a variety of assessments that meet high standards and encourage innovative practices.

== Examination and assessment services ==
The IEB offers a range of assessments at the Grade 12 level, including the National Senior Certificate (NSC), which is aligned with the National Core Curriculum. The NSC includes both continuous assessments—such as oral exams, practical evaluations, and portfolios—and a final summative examination.

In addition to the NSC, the IEB provides Advanced Programme courses and benchmarking tests, such as the Australian Council for Educational Research (ACER) International Benchmarking Tests (IBTs) for Grades 3 to 10, and subject-specific tests like Thinking Skills and Physical Sciences for Grades 10 and 11.
