= France national amateur rugby union team =

France Amateurs
- Union: French Rugby Federation
- Nickname(s): Les bleus/ Les tricolores
- Emblem(s): the Rooster
1st kit	2nd kit

The France Amateurs are the amateur national rugby union team of France. They play in the Four Nations Tournament and in the European Amateur Festival. Their players are selected from Fédérale 1, the French rugby union third division.
