= 2019–20 Glasgow Warriors season =

Glasgow Warriors 2019–2020
- Ground: Scotstoun Stadium (Capacity: 7,351)
- Coach(es): (New Zealand) Dave Rennie (to May 2020) (England) Danny Wilson (from June 2020)
- Captain(s): (Scotland) Ryan Wilson (New Zealand) Callum Gibbins (to July 2020) (Scotland) Fraser Brown (from August 2020)
- Most caps: (Scotland) Rob Harley (20)
- Top scorer: (Scotland) Adam Hastings (102)
- Most tries: (Scotland) George Horne (8)
- League: Pro14
- 3rd in Conference A
1st kit	2nd kit

The 2019–20 season will see Glasgow Warriors compete in the competitions: the Guinness Pro14 and the European Champions Cup. Due to the coronavirus pandemic the season was postponed in May 2020. It continued with a very restricted season finale in August 2020.

== Season overview ==
=== New logo, new website ===
The logo of Glasgow Warriors - apart from a very short spell when the club was deemed Glasgow Caledonians (on the merger with the Caledonia Reds) – was essentially the same for 23 years since the club turned professional. It was that of a Strathclyde warrior wearing a nasal spangenhelm helmet holding a rugby ball and a targe.

The new logo is still of a Strathclyde warrior with a spangenhelm helmet but the similarities end there. Only the warrior's head is now visible; the warrior is now bearded; there is no rugby ball; no targe. Instead in a nod to the old Glasgow District badge logo a saltire is in the background and the words Glasgow Warriors are part of the design below the Strathclyde warrior.

The whole impression is now much more like an American NHL or NFL design.

The club website also was updated. Rebranded with the new logo it was termed a 'mobile first' design given that 75% of its hits were from mobile phones.

=== Rennie's last season ===
On 19 November 2019 Glasgow Warriors announced that their head coach Dave Rennie will be leaving the club at the end of the 2019–20 season. Dave Rennie was headhunted by Rugby Australia after Michael Cheika announced he would quit on 31 December 2019 after the Australia team's lacklustre showing in the 2019 Rugby World Cup in Japan.

=== Next coach announced ===
The Glasgow Warriors board and the Scottish Rugby Union wasted no time in announcing Dave Rennie's successor in the head coach role at the club. The very next day from the Rennie announcement, on 20 November 2019, came the news that the Scotland forwards coach Danny Wilson would take over as head coach at Glasgow Warriors in the summer of 2020. Wilson took over on 1 June 2020.

=== Coronavirus pandemic ===
Due to the pandemic of the deadly COVID-19 strain of coronavirus, the Pro14 suspended all matches in March 2020 to the end of the season. The final, due to take place in Cardiff, was cancelled. If the final was to be played, the team with the highest league ranking points would instead host the match.

The 2019–20 season was extended due to coronavirus. It was to resume in August with teams playing 2 matches against the other teams in the Pro14 that had the same nationality. For Glasgow Warriors this meant that two matches were to be played against Edinburgh Rugby. More controversially, the Pro14 dropped the quarter finals which effectively meant that Glasgow Warriors would not make the play-offs in this season.

=== New co-captain pairing ===
With Callum Gibbins leaving the club, Danny Wilson announced that Fraser Brown would become the new co-captain of the club. Ryan Wilson retained his place as the other co-captain.

== Team ==
=== Coaches ===
- Head Coach: (New Zealand) Dave Rennie (to May 2020) then (England) Danny Wilson (from June 2020)
- Assistant Coach: (Scotland) Kenny Murray
- Assistant Coach: (New Zealand) Jason O'Halloran
- Forwards Coach: (Scotland) John Dalziel
- Head Strength and Conditioning Coach: (New Zealand) Brad Mayo
- Asst. Strength and Conditioning Coach: (Ireland) Liam Walshe
- Asst. Strength and Conditioning Coach: (England) Jonathan Harris-Wright
- Lead Performance Analyst: Greg Woolard
- Asst. Performance Analyst: Graham O'Riordan

=== Staff ===
- Managing Director: Nathan Bombrys
- Chairman: Charles Shaw
- Advisory Group: Walter Malcolm, Douglas McCrea, Alan Lees, Jim Preston, Paul Taylor
- Rugby Operations Manager: John Manson (to September 2019)
- Kit Manager & Masseur: Dougie Mills
- Clinical Manager and Team Physiotherapist:
- Team Doctor: Dr. Jonathan Hanson
- Commercial Operations Manager: Alastair Kellock
- Communications Manager: Jeremy Bone
- Communications Asst: Jack Reid
- Content Producer: Graeme Thomson
- Marketing Insight Executive: Claire Scott
- Operations Manager: James Acheson
- Marketing and Partnerships Manager: Darroch Ramsay
- Partnership Sales Manager: Ross Curle
- Partnership Account Manager: Oliver Norman
- Partnership Account Manager: Jim Taylor
- Community Manager: Lindsey Smith
- Community Rugby Coach: Stuart Lewis

=== Squad ===
Hookers (Scotland) Fraser Brown (Australia) Dylan Evans (Fiji) Mesu Dolokoto (United States) Jack Iscaro (Scotland) Johnny Matthews (United States) Pat O'Toole (Scotland) Grant Stewart (Scotland) George Turner Props (Scotland) Alex Allan (Scotland) Charlie Capps (Argentina) Gaston Cortes (Scotland) Zander Fagerson (Tonga) Siua Halanukonuka (South Africa) Oli Kebble (Scotland) Ewan Mcquillan (Scotland) Adam Nicol (South Africa) Petrus du Plessis (Scotland) D'Arcy Rae (Scotland) Gordon Reid (New Zealand) Aki Seiuli (Scotland) George Thornton Locks (Scotland) Scott Cummings (Scotland) Andrew Davidson (Scotland) Jonny Gray (Fiji) Leone Nakarawa (Scotland) Kiran McDonald (Scotland) Tim Swinson	Loose forwards (Scotland) Adam Ashe (Scotland) Matt Fagerson (Scotland) Bruce Flockhart (Scotland) Chris Fusaro (New Zealand) Callum Gibbins (Scotland) Thomas Gordon (Scotland) Rob Harley (Scotland) Matt Smith (United States) David Tameilau (Fiji) Jale Vakaloloma (Scotland) Ryan Wilson Scrum halves (Scotland) Jamie Dobie (Australia) Nick Frisby (Scotland) George Horne (Scotland) Sean Kennedy (Scotland) Ali Price Fly halves (Scotland) Adam Hastings (Scotland) Ruaridh Jackson (South Africa) Brandon Thomson	Centres (Scotland) Nick Grigg (Scotland) Peter Horne (Scotland) Sam Johnson (Scotland) Huw Jones (Scotland) Patrick Kelly (Scotland) Stafford McDowall (Scotland) Kyle Steyn Back Three (Scotland) Rory Hughes (Scotland) Lee Jones (Fiji) Nikola Matawalu (Scotland) Robbie Nairn (Scotland) Tommy Seymour (Australia) Ratu Tagive (Canada) D. T. H. van der Merwe

==== Scottish Rugby Academy Stage 3 players ====
These players are given a professional contract by the Scottish Rugby Academy. Although given placements they are not contracted by Glasgow Warriors. Players graduate from the academy when a professional club contract is offered.

These players are assigned to Glasgow Warriors for the season 2019–20.

Academy players promoted in the course of the season are listed with the main squad.

- (Scotland) Euan McLaren - Prop
- (Scotland) Murphy Walker - Prop
- (Scotland) Cameron Henderson - Lock
- (Scotland) Marshall Sykes - Lock
- (Scotland) Ross Thompson - Fly-half
- (Scotland) Ollie Smith - Centre
- (Scotland) Grant Hughes - Centre
- (Scotland) Robbie McCallum - Centre

==== Back up players ====
Other players used by Glasgow Warriors over the course of the season.

- Glenn Bryce (Scotland 7s) – Fullback
- Gavin Lowe (Scotland 7s) – Fullback
- Robbie Fergusson (Scotland 7s) – Centre
- Max McFarland (Scotland 7s) – Wing
- Alec Coombes (Scotland 7s) – Wing
- Kyle Rowe (Scotland 7s) – Wing
- (Scotland) Ross Graham (Watsonians) – Hooker
- (New Zealand) Lars Morrice (Ayr) – Lock

==== 2020-21 season players ====
Due to the extension of the 2019–20 season, two players signed for the 2020–21 season made appearances this season for Glasgow Warriors.

- (Scotland) Richie Gray - Lock
- (Argentina) Enrique Pieretto - Prop

== Player statistics ==
During the 2019–20 season, Glasgow have used 52 different players in competitive games. The table below shows the number of appearances and points scored by each player.

Position	Nation	Name	Pro14			Champions Cup			Total	
Position	Nation	Name	Apps (sub)	Tries	Points kicked	Apps (sub)	Tries	Points kicked	Apps (sub)	Total Pts
HK	(Scotland)	Fraser Brown	5	1	0	6	2	0	11	15
HK	(Fiji)	Mesu Dolokoto	(3)	3	0	0	0	0	(3)	15
HK	(Scotland)	Johnny Matthews	(3)	0	0	0	0	0	(3)	0
HK	(Scotland)	Grant Stewart	6(2)	3	0	0	0	0	6(2)	15
HK	(Scotland)	George Turner	4(6)	1	0	(5)	2	0	4(11)	15
PR	(Scotland)	Alex Allan	1(8)	1	0	1(3)	0	0	2(11)	5
PR	(Scotland)	Charlie Capps	1	0	0	0	0	0	1	0
PR	(South Africa)	Petrus du Plessis	(1)	0	0	0	0	0	(1)	0
PR	(Australia)	Dylan Evans	(3)	0	0	0	0	0	(3)	0
PR	(Scotland)	Zander Fagerson	6	1	0	6	0	0	12	5
PR	(South Africa)	Oli Kebble	11(2)	1	0	3(1)	0	0	14(3)	5
PR	(Scotland)	Ewan McQuillan	2	0	0	0	0	0	2	0
PR	(Scotland)	Adam Nicol	3(5)	0	0	(1)	0	0	3(6)	0
PR	(Argentina)	Enrique Pieretto	(1)	0	0	0	0	0	(1)	0
PR	(Scotland)	D'Arcy Rae	4(5)	0	0	(1)	0	0	4(6)	0
PR	(New Zealand)	Aki Seiuli	5(2)	0	0	2(2)	0	0	7(4)	0
PR	(Scotland)	George Thornton	1	0	0	0	0	0	1	0
LK	(Scotland)	Scott Cummings	5	1	0	6	0	0	11	5
LK	(Scotland)	Andrew Davidson	2(6)	1	0	0	0	0	2(6)	5
LK	(Scotland)	Jonny Gray	3	0	0	4	1	0	7	5
LK	(Scotland)	Richie Gray	1	0	0	0	0	0	1	0
LK	(Scotland)	Kiran McDonald	4(4)	0	0	(1)	0	0	4(5)	0
LK	(Fiji)	Leone Nakarawa	2	0	0	1	1	0	3	5
LK	(Scotland)	Tim Swinson	8(2)	1	0	0	0	0	8(2)	5
BR	(Scotland)	Adam Ashe	1(2)	0	0	0	0	0	1(2)	0
BR	(Scotland)	Matt Fagerson	10	2	0	5	0	0	15	10
BR	(Scotland)	Bruce Flockhart	2(1)	0	0	0	0	0	2(1)	0
BR	(Scotland)	Chris Fusaro	2(9)	0	0	1(2)	0	0	3(11)	0
BR	(Scotland)	Callum Gibbins	8(1)	2	0	4	1	0	12(1)	15
BR	(Scotland)	Thomas Gordon	4(5)	1	0	1(3)	0	0	5(8)	5
BR	(Scotland)	Rob Harley	14	0	0	2(4)	0	0	16(4)	0
BR	(Scotland)	Ryan Wilson	10	0	0	6	0	0	16	0
SH	(Scotland)	Jamie Dobie	1(7)	0	0	0	0	0	1(7)	0
SH	(Australia)	Nick Frisby	4(4)	3	0	0	0	0	4(4)	15
SH	(Scotland)	George Horne	7(2)	7	4(2)	1	0	0	11(4)	40
SH	(Scotland)	Ali Price	3(2)	1	0	2(4)	0	0	5(6)	5
FH	(Scotland)	Adam Hastings	6	2	36	6	0	56	12	102
FH	(Scotland)	Ruaridh Jackson	6(6)	2	8	0	0	0	6(6)	18
FH	(South Africa)	Brandon Thomson	4	1	22	0	0	0	4	27
CE	(Scotland)	Nick Grigg	9(2)	0	0	3(1)	1	0	12(3)	5
CE	(Scotland)	Peter Horne	7(1)	2	29	(3)	0	0	7(4)	39
CE	(Scotland)	Sam Johnson	5	1	0	5	1	0	10	10
CE	(Scotland)	Huw Jones	10(4)	3	0	3	1	0	13(4)	20
CE	(Scotland)	Stafford McDowall	5(2)	1	0	1	0	0	6(2)	5
CE	(Scotland)	Kyle Steyn	8(2)	1	0	3(3)	1	0	11(5)	10
WG	(Scotland)	Rory Hughes	3	0	0	0	0	0	3	0
WG	(Fiji)	Nikola Matawalu	4(5)	2	0	2(2)	2	0	6(7)	20
WG	(Scotland)	Robbie Nairn	2	1	0	0	0	0	2	5
WG	(Scotland)	Tommy Seymour	8	1	0	5	1	0	13	10
WG	(Australia)	Ratu Tagive	5(1)	3	0	2	0	0	7(1)	15
WG	(Canada)	D. T. H. van der Merwe	4	1	0	4	2	0	8	15
FB	(Scotland)	Glenn Bryce	6(4)	0	0	2	0	0	8(4)	0

== Staff movements ==
=== Coaches ===
==== Personnel in ====
- (England) Danny Wilson (Head Coach) from Scotland (Forwards Coach) (from June 2020)
- (England) Jonathan Harris-Wright (Asst. Strength and Conditiong Coach) from (England) Bristol Bears Women

==== Personnel out ====
- Jonathan Humphreys to Wales (Asst. Coach)
- Mike Blair to Scotland (Asst. Coach)
- (England) George Petrakos released

=== Medical ===
==== Personnel out ====
- Nicola McGuire (lead physio and clinical manager)
- Gabrielle McCullough (rehab physiotherapist)

=== Staff ===
==== Personnel out ====
- John Manson to (United States) Old Glory DC

== Player movements ==
=== Player transfers ===
==== In ====
- (Scotland) Andrew Davidson from (England) Newcastle Falcons
- Kyle Steyn from Scotland 7s
- (Scotland) Lewis Wynne from (England) London Scottish (loan ends)
- (Scotland) James Malcolm from (England) Doncaster Knights (loan ends)
- (Scotland) George Thornton from (England) Wasps
- (Scotland) Charlie Capps from (France) Stade Niçois
- (Scotland) Alex Dunbar from (England) Newcastle Falcons (loan ends)
- (Scotland) Jamie Dobie from (Scotland) Merchiston Castle School
- (Fiji) Mesu Dolokoto from (Fiji) Fijian Drua
- (Fiji) Jale Vakaloloma from (Australia) Brisbane City
- (United States) Jack Iscaro from (United States) Old Glory DC
- (Scotland) Sean Kennedy from (Scotland) Edinburgh
- (United States) Pat O'Toole from (United States) Houston SaberCats
- (Scotland) Johnny Matthews from (Scotland) Boroughmuir
- (New Zealand) Aki Seiuli from (New Zealand) Otago
- (Scotland) Gordon Reid from (Scotland) Ayrshire Bulls
- (Fiji) Leone Nakarawa from (France) Racing 92
- (Argentina) Gaston Cortes from (England) Leicester Tigers (loan)
- (Scotland) Ewan Mcquillan from (Scotland) Southern Knights
- (Australia) Dylan Evans from (Wales) Scarlets (loan)

==== Out ====
- (Scotland) Stuart Hogg to (England) Exeter Chiefs
- (Scotland) Jamie Bhatti to (Scotland) Edinburgh
- (Scotland) Lewis Wynne to (England) London Scottish
- (Scotland) James Malcolm to (England) London Scottish
- (Scotland) Robbie Smith to (England) Bedford Blues
- (Scotland) Alex Dunbar released
- (Scotland) Kevin Bryce to (Scotland) Glasgow High Kelvinside
- (New Zealand) Lelia Masaga released
- (Scotland) Kaleem Barreto to (France) Stade Niçois (loan)
- (United States) David Tameilau to (United States) San Diego Legion
- (United States) Jack Iscaro to (United States) Old Glory DC
- (Scotland) Rory Hughes to (England) Leicester Tigers (loan)
- (Scotland) Matt Smith to (Scotland) Edinburgh Rugby (loan)
- (Scotland) Charlie Capps to (England) Leicester Tigers (loan)
- (Scotland) Gordon Reid to (England) Northampton Saints

== Competitions ==
=== Pre-season and friendlies ===
Glasgow Warriors lined up two pre-season games against Ulster.

==== Match 1 ====
7 September 2019
1.30pm

Ulster (Ireland)	50-19	(Scotland) Glasgow Warriors
Try: Craig Gilroy x 2 Greg Jones; Angus Kernohan; Ethan McIlroy; Sam Carter; Nick Timoney; Graham Curtis; Con: Billy Burns; Michael Lowry x 2 John Cooney x 2	Preview; Report; Report; Report; Report	Try: Nick Grigg; Ratu Tagive; Matt Smith; Con: Brandon Thomson x 2

Kingspan Stadium
Referee: Robert O’Sullivan (Ireland)

Ulster: Michael Lowry; Craig Gilroy, Matt Faddes, James Hume, Angus Kernohan; Billy Burns (C), Johnny Stewart; Kyle McCall,
Adam McBurney, Ross Kane, Alan O’Connor, David O’Connor, Clive Ross, Marcus Rea, Greg Jones
Replacements: John Andrew, Eric O’Sullivan, Tom O’Toole, Sam Carter, Kieran Treadwell, Matty Rea, Sean Reidy, Nick Timoney, David Shanahan, John Cooney, Angus Curtis, Luke Marshall, Graham Curtis, Ethan McIlroy
Glasgow Warriors: 1. Oli Kebble 2. Johnny Matthews 3. Adam Nicol 4. Tim Swinson (C) 5. Kiran McDonald 6. Matt Smith 7. Tom Gordon
8. Adam Ashe 9. Sean Kennedy 10. Brandon Thomson 11. Ratu Tagive 12. Robbie Fergusson 13. Nick Grigg 14. Robbie Nairn 15. Glenn Bryce
Replacements: Pat O'Toole, Alex Allan, D'arcy Rae, George Thornton, Rob Harley, Lars Morrice, Cameron Henderson, Marshall Sykes, Chris Fusaro, Nick Frisby, Jamie Dobie, Ross Thompson, Paddy Kelly, Alec Coombes, Kyle Rowe, Max McFarland, Ollie Smith.

==== Match 2 ====
14 September 2019
2.30pm

Glasgow Warriors (Scotland)	36 - 33	(Ireland) Ulster
Try: Penalty try Rory Hughes; Johnny Matthews; Glenn Bryce; Adam Nicol; Con: Brandon Thomson x 3 Pen: Brandon Thomson	Preview; Report; Report; Report; Report	Try: Rob Herring; Rob Lyttle; Stuart McCloskey; Penalty try James Hume; Con: John Cooney x 2 Bill Johnston

Scotstoun Stadium
Attendance: 7126
Referee: Ben Blain (SRU)

Glasgow Warriors: 1. Oli Kebble, 2. Johnny Matthews, 3. D'arcy Rae, 4. Andrew Davidson, 5. Tim Swinson, 6. Rob Harley, 7. Chris Fusaro (c),
8. Adam Ashe, 9. Nick Frisby, 10. Brandon Thomson, 11. Rory Hughes, 12. Stafford McDowall, 13. Huw Jones, 14. Kyle Steyn, 15. Glenn Bryce
Replacements: Grant Stewart, Alex Allan, Adam Nicol, Kiran McDonald, Bruce Flockhart, Sean Kennedy, Paddy Kelly, Ruaridh Jackson
Charlie Capps, Callum Gibbins, Matt Fagerson, Jamie Dobie, Nick Grigg, Ratu Tagive, Gavin Lowe.
Ulster: Will Addison; Craig Gilroy, Matt Faddes, Stuart McCloskey, Rob Lyttle; Billy Burns (captain), John Cooney
Eric O’Sullivan, Rob Herring, Marty Moore, Kieran Treadwell, Sam Carter, Matty Rea, Sean Reidy, Nick Timoney
Replacements: John Andrew, Kyle McCall, Jack McGrath, Tom O’Toole, Alan O’Connor, Jordi Murphy, Greg Jones, David Shanahan,
Bill Johnston, James Hume, Angus Curtis, Angus Kernohan, Michael Lowry.

=== Pro14 ===
==== League table ====
2019–20 Pro14 table
Conference A
	Team	P	W	D	L	PF	PA	PD	TF	TA	TBP	LBP	PTS
1	(Ireland) Leinster (CH)	15	15	0	0	531	216	+315	74	28	9	0	69
2	(Ireland) Ulster (RU)	15	8	1	6	385	306	+79	50	40	7	3	44 (Note: Ulster deducted 1 point for administration error regarding Ian Madigan.)
3	(Scotland) Glasgow Warriors	15	8	0	7	364	329	+35	53	42	5	1	38
4	(South Africa) Cheetahs	13	6	0	7	342	280	+62	48	32	5	2	32
5	(Wales) Dragons	15	5	1	9	283	415	–132	32	49	1	1	24
6	(Italy) Zebre	15	3	1	11	230	399	–169	29	56	4	3	21
7	(Wales) Ospreys	15	2	2	11	205	375	–170	21	45	1	4	17
Conference B
	Team	P	W	D	L	PF	PA	PD	TF	TA	TBP	LBP	PTS
1	(Scotland) Edinburgh (SF)	15	11	0	4	391	225	+166	47	27	5	2	51
2	(Ireland) Munster (SF)	15	10	0	5	426	255	+171	53	26	8	3	51
3	(Wales) Scarlets	15	10	0	5	354	274	+80	46	34	5	2	47
4	(Ireland) Connacht	15	8	0	7	302	360	–58	41	48	7	1	40
5	(Italy) Benetton	15	6	1	8	309	350	–41	35	42	5	5	36
6	(Wales) Cardiff Blues	15	7	0	8	283	327	–44	30	38	3	2	33
7	(South Africa) Southern Kings	13	1	0	12	204	498	–294	23	75	0	3	7
If teams are level at any stage, tiebreakers are applied in the following order -: 1. number of matches won 2. the difference between points for and points against 3. the number of tries scored 4. the most points scored 5. the difference between tries for and tries against 6. the fewest red cards received 7. the fewest yellow cards received
Green background indicates teams that compete in the Pro14 play-offs, and also earn a place in the 2020–21 European Champions Cup Blue background indicates teams outside the play-off places that earn a place in the 2020–21 European Champions Cup; Red background indicates teams ineligible for European cup tournaments Plain background indicates teams that earn a place in the 2020–21 European Rugby Challenge Cup. (CH) Champions. (RU) Runners-up. (SF) Losing semi-finalists. (Q) Qualified for Pro14 play-off semi-finals. (e) Cannot reach play-offs.

==== Results ====
===== Round 1 =====
27 September 2019
6.05pm

(1BP) Cheetahs (South Africa)	48 - 14	(Scotland) Glasgow Warriors
Try: Ruan Pienaar; Joseph Dweba x 2 Rhyno Smith x 2 Junior Pokomela; Sias Koen; Con: Ruan Pienaar x 5 Pen: Ruan Pienaar	Preview; Report; Report; Report	Try: Nick Frisby; Robbie Nairn; Con: Brandon Thomson x 2

Toyota Stadium
Attendance: 4,528
Referee: Dan Jones (WRU)

===== Round 2 =====
4 October 2019
7.35pm

(1BP) Glasgow Warriors (Scotland)	21 - 25	(Wales) Scarlets
Try: Brandon Thomson; Stafford McDowall; Con: Brandon Thomson; Pen: Brandon Thomson x 3	Preview; Report; Report; Report	Try: Kieran Hardy; Paul Asquith; Steff Evans; Con: Dan Jones; Angus O'Brien; Pen: Dan Jones x 2

Scotstoun Stadium
Attendance: 6,897
Referee: George Clancy (IRFU)

===== Round 3 =====
12 October 2019
7.35pm

Glasgow Warriors (Scotland)	17 - 13	(Wales) Cardiff Blues
Try: Callum Gibbins; Nick Frisby; Con: Brandon Thomson x 2 Pen: Brandon Thomson	Preview; Report; Report; Report	Try: Aled Summerhill; Con: Jarrod Evans; Pen: Jarrod Evans x 2

Scotstoun Stadium
Attendance: 6,708
Referee: Sean Gallagher (IRFU)

===== Round 4 =====
26 October 2019
3pm

Dragons (Wales)	18 - 5	(Scotland) Glasgow Warriors
Try: Taine Basham; Ashton Hewitt; Con: Sam Davies; Pen: Sam Davies x 2	Preview; Report; Report; Report	Try: Huw Jones

Rodney Parade
Attendance: George Clancy (IRFU)
Referee: 3.673

===== Round 5 =====
1 November 2019
7.35pm

(1BP) Glasgow Warriors (Scotland)	50 - 0	(South Africa) Southern Kings
Try: Grant Stewart; Zander Fagerson x 2 Callum Gibbins; Oli Kebble; Nikola Matawalu x 2 Ratu Tagive; Con: Adam Hastings x 4	Preview; Report; Report; Report

Scotstoun Stadium
Attendance: 6,759
Referee: Joy Neville (IRFU)

===== Round 6 =====
9 November 2019
3pm

Zebre (Italy)	7 - 31	(Scotland) Glasgow Warriors (1BP)
Try: Pierre Bruno; Con: Carlo Canna	Preview; Report; Report; Report	Try: George Horne x 2 Adam Hastings; Ratu Tagive; Nick Frisby; Con: Adam Hastings x 2 Ruaridh Jackson

Stadio Lanfranchi
Attendance: 2,000
Referee: Ian Davies (WRU)

===== Round 7 =====
30 November 2019
7.35pm

Glasgow Warriors (Scotland)	10 - 23	(Ireland) Leinster
Try: Ruaridh Jackson x 2	Preview; Report; Report; Report	Try: Cian Kelleher x 2 Con: Ross Byrne x 2 Pen: Ross Byrne x3

Scotstoun Stadium
Attendance: 7,351
Referee: Craig Evans (WRU)

===== Round 8 - 1872 Cup 1st leg =====
21 December 2019
5.45pm

Glasgow Warriors (Scotland)	20 - 16	(Scotland) Edinburgh (1BP)
Try: Ali Price; George Turner; Con: Adam Hastings x 2 Pen: Adam Hastings x 2	Preview; Report; Report; Report	Try: Blair Kinghorn; Con: Jaco van der Walt; Pen: Simon Hickey x 3

Scotstoun Stadium
Attendance: 7,351
Referee: Ben Blain (SRU)

===== Round 9 - 1872 Cup 2nd leg =====
28 December 2019
3pm

(1 BP) Edinburgh (Scotland)	29 - 19	(Scotland) Glasgow Warriors
Try: Darcy Graham x 2 Henry Pyrgos x 2 Con: Simon Hickey x 2 Pen: Simon Hickey	Preview; Report; Report; Report	Try: Huw Jones; Scott Cummings; George Horne; Con: Adam Hastings x 2

Murrayfield Stadium
Attendance: 27,437
Referee: Mike Adamson (SRU)

===== Round 10 =====
4 January 2020
1pm

Benetton (Italy)	19 - 38	(Scotland) Glasgow Warriors (1BP)
Try: Hame Faiva; Braam Steyn; Antonio Rizzi; Con: Tommaso Allan x 2	Preview; Report; Report; Report	Try: Sam Johnson; Peter Horne; George Horne x2 Nikola Matawalu; Andrew Davidson; Con: Peter Horne x 4

Stadio Comunale di Monigo
Attendance: 4,667
Referee: Nigel Owens (WRU)

===== Round 11 =====
14 February 2020
7.35pm

(1BP) Glasgow Warriors (Scotland)	56 - 24	(Italy) Zebre
Try: George Horne x 2 Matt Fagerson; Mesu Dolokoto x 2 D. T. H. van der Merwe; Penalty try Thomas Gordon; Con: Peter Horne x5 Ruaridh Jackson x2	Preview; Report; Report; Report	Try: Daniele Rimpelli; Marcello Violi; Pierre Bruno; Con: Michelangelo Biondelli; Marcello Violi; Pen: Michelangelo Biondelli

Scotstoun Stadium
Attendance: 6,692
Referee: Joy Neville (IRFU)

===== Round 12 =====
22 February 2020
7.35pm

Glasgow Warriors (Scotland)	v	(Wales) Dragons
	Preview

Scotstoun Stadium

===== Round 13 =====
28 February 2020
7.35pm

Leinster (Ireland)	v	(Scotland) Glasgow Warriors
	Preview

RDS Arena

===== Coronavirus suspension =====
The subsequent matches scheduled were indefinitely suspended due to the Coronavirus pandemic.

===== Round 14 =====
21 March 2020
5.15pm

Ospreys (Wales)	cancelled	(Scotland) Glasgow Warriors

Liberty Stadium

===== Round 15 =====
27 March 2020

Glasgow Warriors (Scotland)	cancelled	(Ireland) Ulster

Scotstoun Stadium

===== Round 16 =====
10 April 2020
7.35pm

Connacht Rugby (Ireland)	cancelled	(Scotland) Glasgow Warriors

Galway Sportsgrounds

===== Round 17 =====
17 April 2020

Glasgow Warriors (Scotland)	cancelled	(South Africa) Cheetahs

Scotstoun Stadium

===== Round 18 =====
25 April 2020
5.15pm

Munster (Ireland)	cancelled	(Scotland) Glasgow Warriors

Thomond Park

===== Round 19 =====
8 May 2020
7.35pm

Ulster (Ireland)	cancelled	(Scotland) Glasgow Warriors

Kingspan Stadium

===== Round 20 =====
15 May 2020
7.35pm

Glasgow Warriors (Scotland)	cancelled	(Wales) Ospreys

Scotstoun Stadium

===== Round 21 - 1872 Cup 3rd leg =====
c. 29 May 2020

Edinburgh (Scotland)	cancelled	(Scotland) Glasgow Warriors

Murrayfield Stadium

==== Post-suspension matches ====
===== Round 14 - 1872 Cup 3rd leg =====
22 August 2020
17:15

Glasgow Warriors (Scotland)	15–30	(Scotland) Edinburgh
	Report

Murrayfield Stadium
Attendance: 0
Referee: Mike Adamson (SRU)

===== Round 15 =====
28 August 2020
19:35

Edinburgh (Scotland)	3–15	(Scotland) Glasgow Warriors
	Report

Murrayfield Stadium
Attendance: 700
Referee: Ben Blain (SRU)

=== Europe ===
In the European Rugby Champions Cup pool stage, Glasgow Warriors were placed as Tier 2 seeds and drawn with English sides Exeter Chiefs and Sale Sharks and French side La Rochelle.

==== Pool ====
Team	P	W	D	L	PF	PA	Diff	TF	TA	TB	LB	Pts
(England) Exeter Chiefs (2)	6	5	1	0	186	105	81	25	14	5	0	27
(Scotland) Glasgow Warriors	6	3	1	2	141	115	26	17	14	2	1	17
(France) La Rochelle	6	2	0	4	107	146	–39	14	18	1	1	10
(England) Sale Sharks	6	1	0	5	92	160	–68	11	21	0	3	7

==== Results ====
===== Round 1 =====
16 November 2019
1pm

Glasgow Warriors (Scotland)	13 - 7	(England) Sale Sharks
Try: D. T. H. van der Merwe; Con: Adam Hastings; Pen: Adam Hastings x 2	Preview; Report; Report; Report	Try: Coenie Oosthuizen; Con: AJ MacGinty

Scotstoun Stadium
Attendance: 7,351
Referee: Alexandre Ruiz (France)

===== Round 2 =====
23 November 2019
3.15pm

(1BP) Exeter Chiefs (England)	24 - 18	(Scotland) Glasgow Warriors
Try: Jonny Hill; Henry Slade; Joe Simmonds; Tom O'Flaherty; Con: Joe Simmonds x 4 Pen: Joe Simmonds x 2	Preview; Report; Report; Report	Try: Nick Grigg; George Turner; Con: Adam Hastings; Pen: Adam Hastings

Sandy Park
Attendance: 10,545
Referee: Pascal Gaüzère (France)

===== Round 3 =====
7 December 2019
3.15pm

(1 BP) La Rochelle (France)	24 - 27	(Scotland) Glasgow Warriors
Try: Dany Priso; Zeno Kieft; Con: Jules Plisson; Pen: Jules Plisson x 4	Preview; Report; Report; Report	Try: Callum Gibbins; Nikola Matawalu; Kyle Steyn; Con: Adam Hastings x 3 Pen: Adam Hastings x 2

Stade Marcel-Deflandre
Attendance: 15,678
Referee: Luke Pearce (England)

===== Round 4 =====
14 December 2019
5.15pm

(1 BP) Glasgow Warriors (Scotland)	7 - 12	(France) La Rochelle
Try: Fraser Brown; Con: Adam Hastings	Preview; Report; Report; Report	Try: Jules Favre; Levani Botia; Con: Brock James

Scotstoun Stadium
Attendance: 6,801
Referee: Wayne Barnes (England)

===== Round 5 =====
11 January 2020
3.15pm

Glasgow Warriors (Scotland)	31 - 31	(England) Exeter Chiefs
	Preview; Report

Scotstoun Stadium

===== Round 6 =====
18 January 2020
5.30pm

Sale Sharks (England)	v	(Scotland) Glasgow Warriors
	Preview

AJ Bell Stadium

== Warrior of the month awards ==
Award	Winner
September	(Scotland) Rob Harley
October	(Scotland) Kiran McDonald
November	(Scotland) George Horne
December	(Scotland) Huw Jones
January	(Scotland) Zander Fagerson
February	(New Zealand) Aki Seiuli
March	(Scotland) Fraser Brown
April	no award
May	no award

== End of Season awards ==
Award	Winner
Young Player of the Season	(Scotland) Jamie Dobie
Coaches Award	(Scotland) Rob Harley
Test Player of the Season	(Scotland) Scott Cummings
Most Improved Player of the Season	(Scotland) Thomas Gordon
Al Kellock Leadership Award	(Scotland) Ryan Wilson
Community Club of the Season	Biggar
Try of the Season	(Scotland) George Horne vs. (Italy) Zebre
Players' Player of the Season	(Scotland) Zander Fagerson
Player of the Season	(Scotland) George Horne

== Competitive debuts this season ==
A player's nationality shown is taken from the nationality at the highest honour for the national side obtained; or if never capped internationally their place of birth. Senior caps take precedence over junior caps or place of birth; junior caps take precedence over place of birth. A player's nationality at debut may be different from the nationality shown. Combination sides like the British and Irish Lions or Pacific Islanders are not national sides, or nationalities.

Players in BOLD font have been capped by their senior international XV side as nationality shown.

Players in Italic font have capped either by their international 7s side; or by the international XV 'A' side as nationality shown.

Players in normal font have not been capped at senior level.

A position in parentheses indicates that the player debuted as a substitute. A player may have made a prior debut for Glasgow Warriors in a non-competitive match, 'A' match or 7s match; these matches are not listed.

Tournaments where competitive debut made:

**Scottish Inter-District Championship**	**Welsh–Scottish League**	**WRU Challenge Cup**	**Celtic League**	**Celtic Cup**	**1872 Cup**	**Pro12**	**Pro14**	**Rainbow Cup**	**United Rugby Championship**	**European Challenge Cup**	**Heineken Cup / European Champions Cup**

Crosshatching indicates a jointly hosted match.

Number	Player nationality	Name	Position	Date of debut	Venue	Stadium	Opposition nationality	Opposition side	Tournament	Match result	Scoring debut
305	(Scotland)	**Jamie Dobie**	(Scrum half)	2019-09-27	Away	Free State Stadium	(South Africa)	Cheetahs	Pro14	Loss	Nil
306	(Scotland)	Johnny Matthews	(Hooker)	2019-09-27	Away	Free State Stadium	(South Africa)	Cheetahs	Pro14	Loss	Nil
307	(Scotland)	George Thornton	(Prop)	2019-10-12	Home	Scotstoun Stadium	(Wales)	Cardiff Blues	Pro14	Win	Nil
308	(New Zealand)	Aki Seiuli	(Prop)	2019-11-30	Home	Scotstoun Stadium	(Ireland)	Leinster	Pro14	Loss	Nil
309	(Fiji)	**Mesu Dolokoto**	(Hooker)	2020-02-14	Home	Scotstoun Stadium	(Italy)	Zebre	Pro14	Win	10 pts
310	(Scotland)	Ewan McQuillin	(Prop)	2020-02-14	Home	Scotstoun Stadium	(Wales)	Dragons	Pro14	Win	Nil
311	(Australia)	Dylan Evans	(Prop)	2020-08-22	Home	Murrayfield Stadium	(Scotland)	Edinburgh	1872 Cup	Loss	Nil
312	(England)	Charlie Capps	(Prop)	2020-08-28	Away	Murrayfield Stadium	(Scotland)	Edinburgh	Pro14	Win	Nil
313	(Argentina)	**Enrique Pieretto**	(Prop)	2020-08-28	Away	Murrayfield Stadium	(Scotland)	Edinburgh	Pro14	Win	Nil

== Sponsorship ==
- SP Energy Networks - Title Sponsor and Community Sponsor
- Scottish Power - Official Kit

=== Official kit supplier ===
- Macron

=== Official kit sponsors ===
- Malcolm Group
- McCrea Financial Services
- Denholm Oilfield
- Ross Hall Hospital
- Story Contracting
- Leidos

=== Official sponsors ===
- The Famous Grouse
- Clyde Travel Management
- Harper Macleod
- Caledonia Best
- Eden Mill Brewery and Distillery
- David Lloyd Leisure
- Crabbie's
- Cala Homes
- Capital Solutions
- Martha's Restaurant
- Sterling Furniture

=== Official partners ===
- A.G. Barr
- Benchmarx
- Black & Lizars
- Cameron House
- Glasgow Airport
- Healthspan Elite
- KubeNet
- Mentholatum
- MSC Nutrition
- Smile Plus
- Lenco Utilities
- Scot JCB News Scotland
- HF Group
- Primestaff
- Village Hotel Club
- The Crafty Pig
- Kooltech
- Savills
- iPro Sports
- RHA
