= Moses Sorovi =

Fijian Australian rugby union player

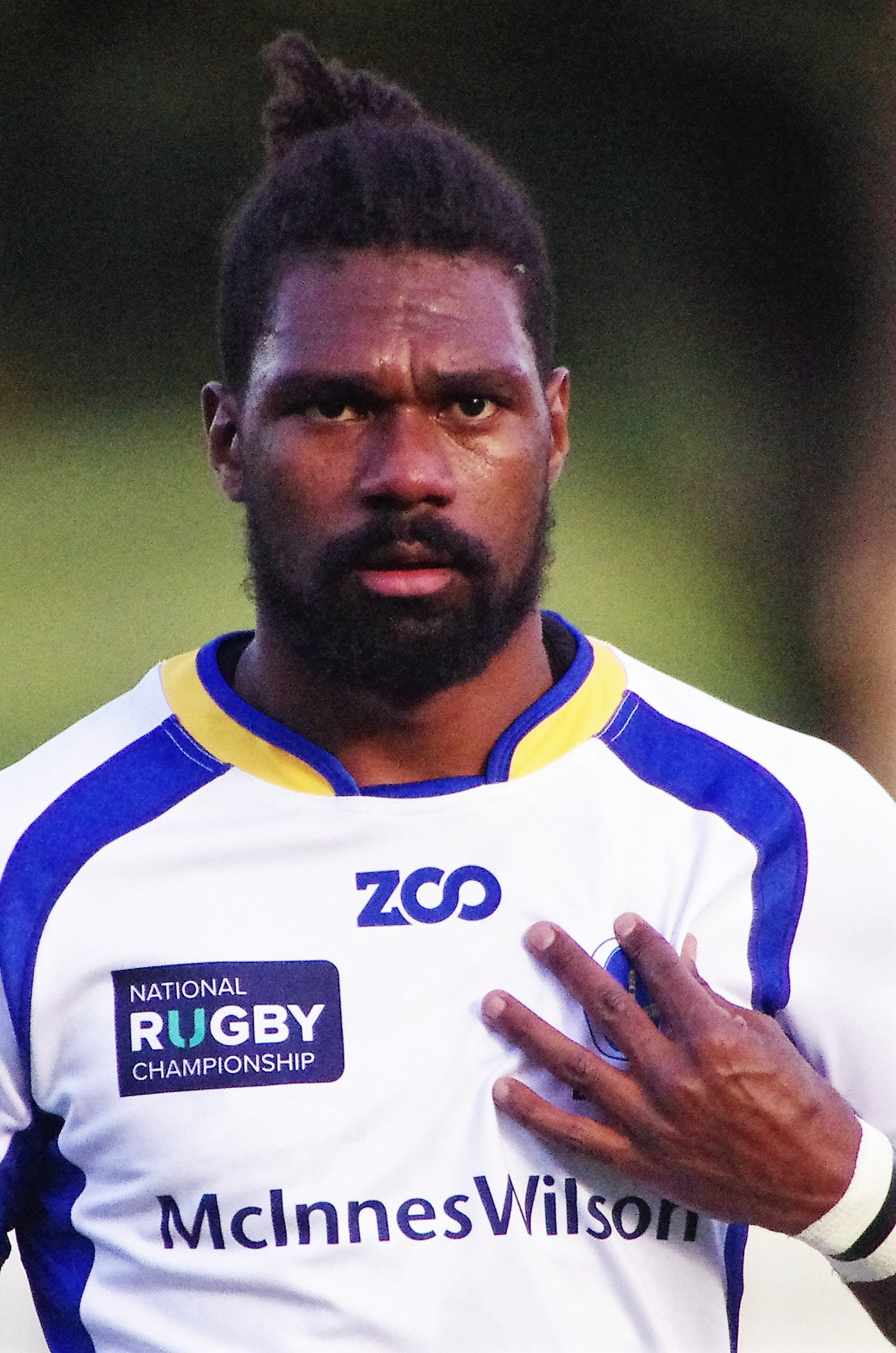
- Full name: Mosese Jacob Dujon Kepa Sorovi
- Born: 15 January 1996 (age 30) Thursday Island, Queensland, Australia
- Height: 173 cm (5 ft 8 in)
- Weight: 80 kg (176 lb)
- School: St Peters Lutheran College

Rugby union career
Youth career
- –2013: St. Peters Lutheran College
- 2013–2015: University of Queensland
Amateur team(s)
Years	Team	Apps	(Points)
2013–2018	University of Queensland		
2017–	Wests		
Senior career
Years	Team	Apps	(Points)
2015–2019	Brisbane City	33	(11)
2017–2021	Reds	40	(10)
2022–2023	Rebels	2	(0)
2024	Drua	0	(0)
2026–	Brumbies	0	(0)
International career
Years	Team	Apps	(Points)
2013	Australian Schoolboys	2	(0)
2021–2024	Fiji	4	(0)
- Correct as of 31 August 2026

Mosese Jacob Dujon Kepa Sorovi (born 15 January 1996) is a Fijian Australian professional rugby union player. Currently contracted to the Fijian Drua in the Super Rugby, he began his career with the Queensland Reds and joined the Melbourne Rebels briefly. He has also represented Australia at Schoolboy's level.

Sorovi is of both Indigenous Fijian and Aboriginal Australian ancestry.

== Early life ==
Sorovi was born on Thursday Island on the Torres Strait Islands archipelago in the Far North of the Australian state of Queensland. He was named after his father Mosese Sorovi Sr. whom hailed from Matanuku, Kadavu, Fiji. Sorovi grew up on Yam Island roughly 100 km north-west of Thursday Island. Sorovi played rugby league on Yam Island and his idol was Lote Tuqiri and later Will Genia.

== Career ==
After moving to Brisbane for a scholarship at St. Peters Lutheran College with his brother, Sorovi began to play rugby union. He played for the schools XV side and was a key player in there 2012 undefeated season. In 2013 Sorovi represented the Queensland Schoolboys and the Australian Schoolboys, and captained the Queensland Indigenous U18s team to a National Indigenous Championship title.

In 2015 Sorovi was recruited by Brisbane City in the National Rugby Championship (NRC) and was maintained as a back-up scrum-half in the team behind Nick Frisby. The team won the 2015 Championship, finishing Minor Premiers and successfully challenging for the Horan-Little Shield.

Sorovi's first season with Queensland began in 2017, making his debut against the Brumbies.

Sorovi played 7 games in the 2020 Super Rugby AU season, coming off the bench in the Reds' defeat in the final to the Brumbies. After 37 appearances for the Reds, Sorovi departed Queensland at the end of the 2021 Super Rugby season to join the Rebels.

On 15 June 2021, Sorovi was named in the Fiji squad for the matches against New Zealand.

In April 2024 Sorovi joined the Fijian Drua on a short-term contract.

In early 2026, Sorovi joined the ACT Brumbies in Canberra, although he did not play any minutes for the team during their 2026 season. He was later named in their squad ahead of the Super Rugby AUS tournament in August.

== Career statistics ==
As of 3 June 2023

Season	Team	Games	Starts	Sub	Mins	Tries	Cons	Pens	Drops	Points	Yel	Red
2017	Reds	1	0	1	3	0	0	0	0	0	0	0
2018	Reds	9	3	6	332	1	0	0	0	5	0	0
2019	Reds	14	4	10	330	1	0	0	0	5	0	0
2020	Reds	3	0	3	18	0	0	0	0	0	0	0
2020 AU	Reds	4	0	4	102	0	0	0	0	0	0	0
2021 AU	Reds	3	0	3	57	0	0	0	0	0	0	0
2021 TT	Reds	3	0	3	67	0	0	0	0	0	0	0
2022	Rebels	2	0	2	51	0	0	0	0	0	0	0
2023	Rebels	0	0	0	0	0	0	0	0	0	0	0
Total		39	7	32	960	2	0	0	0	10	0	0
