= Brisbane City =

Brisbane City may refer to:

- Brisbane, the metropolis
- City of Brisbane, the local government area at the centre of the metropolis
  - Brisbane City Council, which manages the City of Brisbane
  - Brisbane central business district, the central suburb of the City of Brisbane, officially called Brisbane City
- Brisbane City (rugby union), rugby union club
- Brisbane City FC, soccer club
