= Charlie Capps (rugby union) =

English rugby union player

- Born: Charlie Capps; 8 June 1997 (age 29) Harrogate, Yorkshire, England
- Height: 1.85 m (6 ft 1 in)
- Weight: 120 kg (18 st 13 lb)
- School: Prince Henry's Grammar School

Rugby union career
- Position: Tighthead Prop
Amateur team(s)
| Years | Team | Apps | (Points) |
- Ripon
| 2018-19 | Stade Niçois | | |
Senior career
| Years | Team | Apps | (Points) |
| 2015-18 | Yorkshire Carnegie | 10 | (0) |
| 2019-20 | Glasgow Warriors | 1 | (0) |
International career
| Years | Team | Apps | (Points) |
| 2015 | England U18s | | |

Charlie Capps (born 8 June 1997) is a rugby union player who plays for Glasgow Warriors at the tighthead prop position.

== Rugby Union career ==
=== Amateur career ===
Capps played for Ripon.

Scottish qualified, Capps went down the SRU route for recognition in 2018. He signed with the SRU's partnership club in France, Stade Niçois.

=== Professional career ===
Capps joined Yorkshire Carnegie in 2015-16. He made 10 appearances for Carnegie.

On 10 April 2019 it was announced that Capps would sign for Glasgow Warriors for the 2019–20 season.

He made his debut for the Warriors against Ulster Rugby on 14 September 2019.

=== International career ===
Capps represented England U18s in 2015.
