= George Thornton (rugby union) =

Scottish rugby union footballer (born 1997)

- Born: George Thornton; 20 January 1997 (age 29)
- Height: 1.91 m (6 ft 3 in)
- Weight: 117 kg (18 st 6 lb)
- School: Moulton College; Bishop Burton College

Rugby union career
- Position: Loosehead Prop
Amateur team(s)
Years	Team	Apps	(Points)
- Bishop Burton College
–	Market Harborough		
Senior career
Years	Team	Apps	(Points)
2017–19	Wasps	4	(0)
2019	→Nottingham	3	(0)
2019–21	Glasgow Warriors	2	(0)
2023	Chicago Hounds	14	(10)
Super Rugby
Years	Team	Apps	(Points)
2019–2020	Boroughmuir Bears	1	(5)
2021–23	Ayrshire Bulls		
2024	Waratahs	2	(0)
International career
Years	Team	Apps	(Points)
	Scotland U18s	5	(5)
2016–2018	Scotland U20		

George Thornton (born 20 January 1997) is a former Scotland U20 international rugby union player who plays for Ayrshire Bulls as a prop. He also plays for the Chicago Hounds in Major League Rugby (MLR).

== Rugby Union career ==
=== Amateur career ===
Thornton played for Bishop Burton College in the BUCS University leagues. He also played for Market Harborough in Midlands 2 East (South).

While at Moulton College in Northampton, Thornton was selected for the Scottish Exiles.

=== Professional career ===
Thornton was signed by Wasps in 2017 as an academy player. He has made 4 appearances for Wasps.

In 2019 he was loaned out to Nottingham to play in the RFU Championship.

On 3 April 2019 it was announced that Thornton would sign for Glasgow Warriors for the 2019–20 season. He made his debut for the Warriors on 12 October 2019 against Cardiff Blues in a 17-13 win at Scotstoun Stadium.

On 16 November 2019 he played for the Boroughmuir Bears in the Super 6. He scored a try.

He was released by Glasgow Warriors at the end of the 2020-21 season and was quickly signed by the Ayrshire Bulls for the 2021-22 season.

=== International career ===
Thornton represented Scotland under 18s five times scoring one try. He made his debut for Scotland under 20s in the Six Nations match against England. He played in the 2017 Under 20 Six Nations Championship and the Under 20 World Rugby Championship. He started in all of Scotland's 5 matches in Georgia. Thornton is Scottish qualified through his mother from North Berwick.
