= Adam Korczyk =

Australian rugby union player

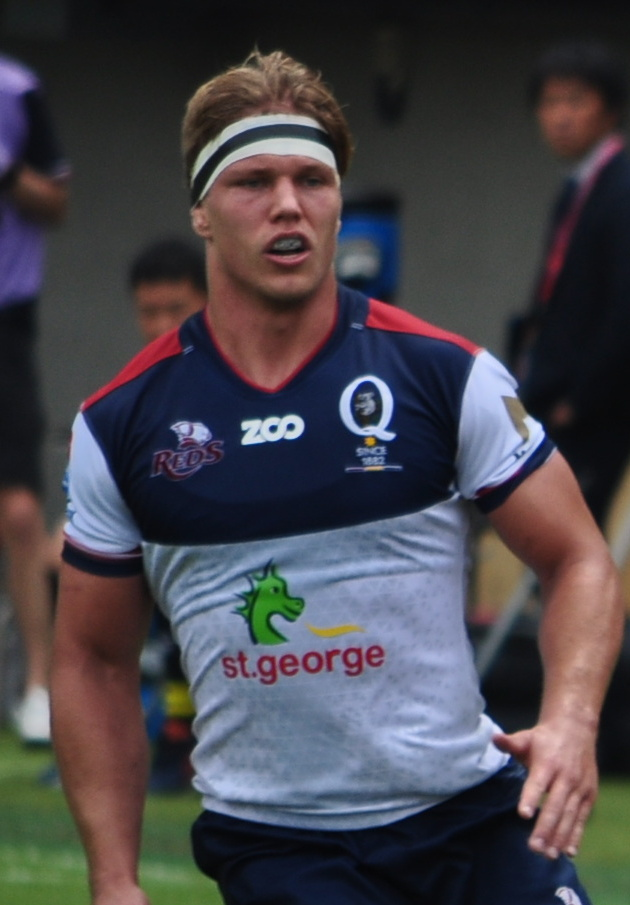
- Korczyk with the Reds in 2018
- Born: 14 February 1995 (age 31) Auckland, New Zealand
- Height: 192 cm (6 ft 4 in)
- Weight: 107 kg (16 st 12 lb)
- School: Brisbane State High School

Rugby union career
- Position: Blindside Flanker
- Current team: University of Queensland
Senior career
Years	Team	Apps	(Points)
2014–2018	Brisbane City	22	(10)
2019–	Ealing Trailfinders	6	(0)
- Correct as of 23 July 2021
Super Rugby
Years	Team	Apps	(Points)
2015–2019	Reds	26	(10)
- Correct as of 14 July 2017
International career
Years	Team	Apps	(Points)
2012	Australian Schoolboys	2	
2015	Australia U20	6	

Adam Korczyk (born 14 February 1995) is an Australian professional rugby union player. He currently plays as a flanker for Ealing Trailfinders in the English Championship.

== Early life ==
Korczyk was born in Auckland, New Zealand in a family originally from Poland, but moved to Brisbane with his family at an early age. He was educated at Brisbane State High School (BSHS) and was selected for the Australian Schoolboys rugby team in 2012.

== Career ==
Korczyk played premier grade rugby for the University of Queensland Rugby Club, and was selected for the Brisbane City team in the National Rugby Championship in 2014. Later that year he signed a two-year development contract with the Queensland Reds. He made his Super Rugby debut for the Reds during the 2015 Super Rugby season against the Bulls in Pretoria. The following week, Korczyk scored a try in the team's win against the Cheetahs in Bloemfontein.
