= Leone Nakarawa =

Fiji international rugby union player

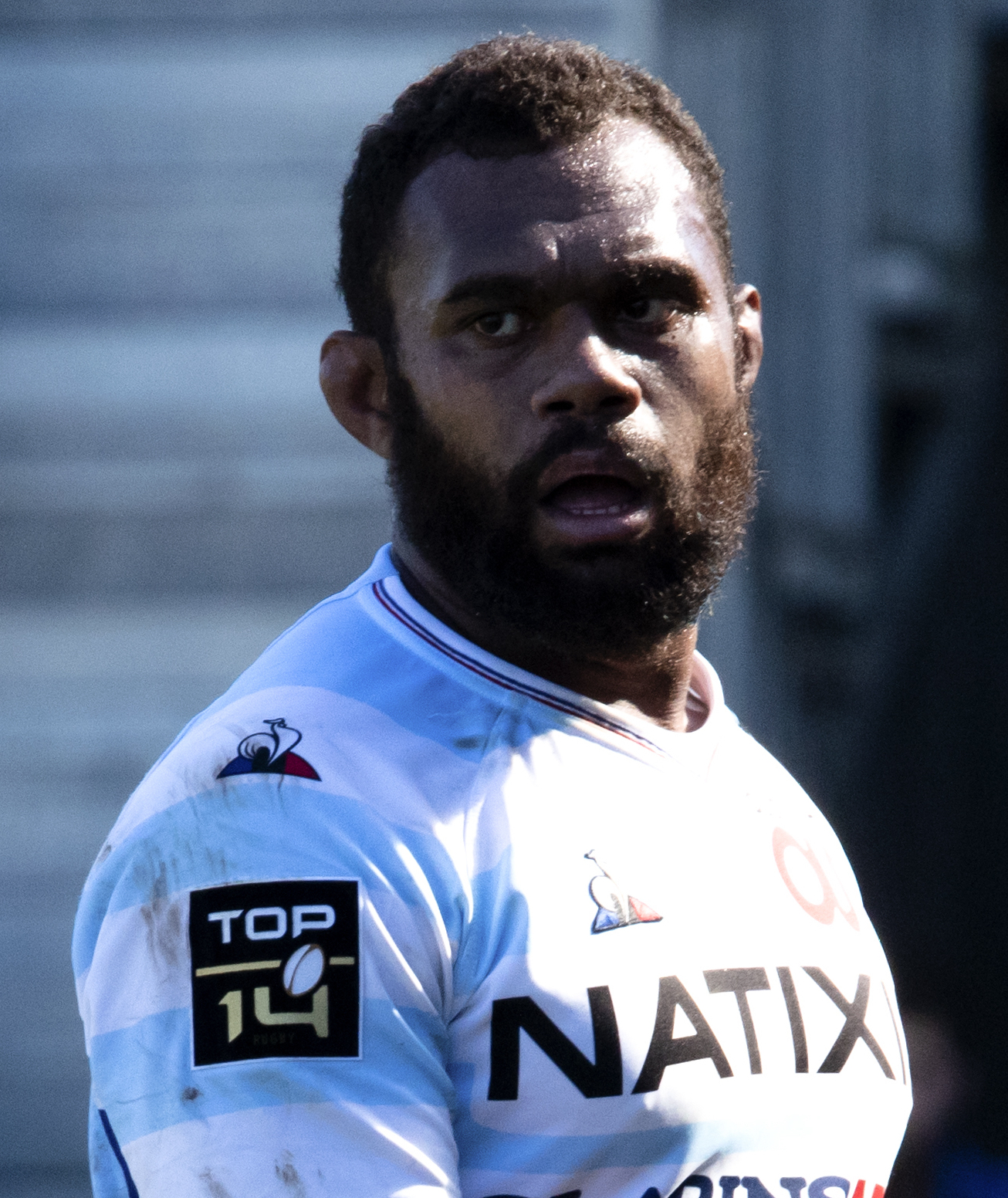
- Nakarawa playing for Racing 92 in 2019
- Born: 2 April 1988 (age 38) Tavua, Fiji
- Height: 198 cm (6 ft 6 in)
- Weight: 109 kg (240 lb; 17 st 2 lb)
- School: Tavua College

Rugby union career
- Position: Lock
- Current team: Castres
Senior career
Years	Team	Apps	(Points)
2013–2016	Glasgow Warriors	80	(45)
2016–2019	Racing 92	86	(115)
2021–2022	Toulon	13	(5)
2022–	Castres	74	(30)
- Correct as of 185 June 2022
International career
Years	Team	Apps	(Points)
2009–2021	Fiji	66	(65)
- Correct as of 18 June 2022
National sevens team
Years	Team		Comps
2013–2018	Fiji		8
- Correct as of 1 June 2022
Medal record
Men's rugby sevens
Representing Fiji
Olympic Games
Gold medal – first place	2016 Rio de Janeiro	Team competition

Lieutenant Leone Nakarawa OF (born 2 April 1988) is a Fijian rugby union footballer and Olympic gold medalist. He plays as a lock for Castres and represents the Fijian national team in international rugby. He previously played for Glasgow Warriors and is Warrior No. 224. He won the Pro12 with the Glasgow Warriors in 2014–15 and re-signed with the club in 2020. In between that period, he played for Racing 92. In 2018 he was awarded the EPCR Player of the Year accolade.

Nakarawa is generally considered to be one of the best lock forwards in the world. He is most famous for his offloading skills, athleticism and general play in open field.

== Rugby Union career ==
=== Amateur career ===
While with the Warriors he occasionally turned out for the amateur club Glasgow Hawks.

=== Professional career ===
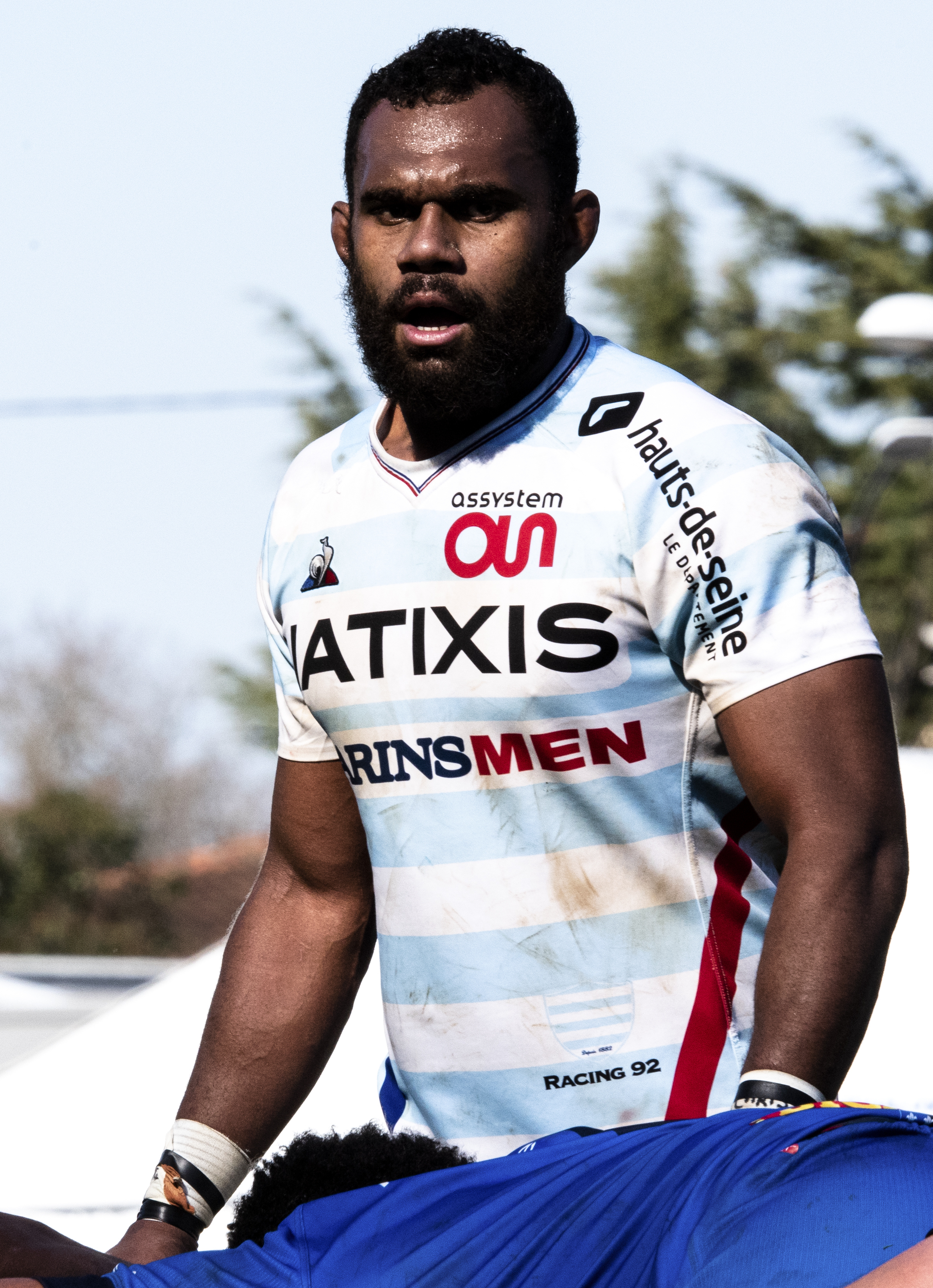
Nakarawa playing for Racing 92 in 2019

He signed for Glasgow Warriors in August 2013.

Nakarawa was named Man of the Match for Glasgow in the 2015 Pro12 Grand Final in Belfast. He had the most offloads in the 2014–15 European Rugby Champions Cup with 25.

Nakarawa moved to Racing 92 after the World Cup. After his first season in France, Nakarawa was named in the Pro12 Dream Team at the end of the 2015/16 season. In December 2019 Racing 92 announced his contract had been terminated for "a total lack of team spirit and marked insubordination" and "abandoning his post' after he failed to return from World Cup duty on time.

On 2 January 2020 Glasgow Warriors announced that they had signed Nakarawa on a contract to the end of the 2019-20 season. This was then extended to the following season.

On Jan 27th 2021 he signed on a one year contract with Pro14 side Ulster that would have seen him play in Belfast from the start of the 2021-22 season. However this deal fell through on 10 June 2021 with the Ulster club stating "We can today confirm that, on receipt of a detailed medical report following an examination by the club at the weekend, Leone Nakarawa will no longer be joining Ulster Rugby for next season." Toulon signed the player in June 2021.

=== International career ===
The talented Second-Row forward debuted for Fiji against Tonga at Nuku'alofa on 13 June 2009. He played in the Pacific Nations Cup for Fiji in 2010 and was one of Fiji's only bright sparks in their campaign at the 2011 Rugby World Cup.

In 2011, New Zealand had to make an exemption to their ban on Fiji Military personnel entering the country in order for Nakarawa to play in the World Cup games. He later quit the army to focus fully on his rugby career.

Nakarawa played for Fiji Barbarians and resisted moves to France and England; not moving to Europe until signing his first professional contract with Glasgow Warriors.

After a hugely successful season, Nakarawa was selected to play for Fijian national team at the 2015 Rugby World Cup in England. He was subsequently named in the World Cup Dream Team at the end of the tournament.

At the 2016 Summer Olympics, Nakarawa was part of the Fiji team in rugby sevens, where he scored a try in the final in a one-sided 43–7 victory over Great Britain to claim the gold medal, which was also Fiji's first ever Olympic medal in any sport.

== Honours and awards ==
After the 2016 Summer Olympics, Nakarawa was awarded the Officer of the Order of Fiji.

Glasgow Warriors

- Pro12 (1): 2014–15

Fiji

- Pacific Nations Cup (4): 2015, 2016, 2017, 2018
