= Dave Rennie =

New Zealand rugby union player and coach

- Full name: David Noel Rennie
- Born: 22 November 1963 (age 62) Upper Hutt, New Zealand
- Height: 189 cm (6 ft 2 in)
- School: Heretaunga College

Rugby union career
- Position(s): Centre, wing
Senior career
| Years | Team | Apps | (Points) |
| 1986–1991 | Wellington | 58 | (60) |
- Correct as of 20 November 2019
International career
| Years | Team | Apps | (Points) |
| 1990 | Cook Islands XV | 1 | (0) |
- Correct as of 9 October 2021
Coaching career
- Years: Team
- 1999: Wellington (assistant)
- 2000–2002: Wellington
- 2002: Hurricanes (assistant)
- 2006–2011: Manawatu
- 2008–2010: New Zealand U20
- 2012–2017: Chiefs
- 2017–2020: Glasgow Warriors
- 2020–2023: Australia
- 2021: Barbarians
- 2023–2026: Kobe Steelers
- 2026–: New Zealand

David Noel Rennie (born 22 November 1963) is a New Zealand and Cook Islands professional rugby union coach and former player. He is currently the head coach of the New Zealand national team, the All Blacks.

He was previously the head coach of the Australia national rugby union team from 2020 to 2023, having also coached the Chiefs, Manawatu and Wellington in New Zealand, the New Zealand U20s, and Glasgow Warriors in Scotland from 2017 to 2020. Rennie's playing position was centre.

== Playing career ==
=== Amateur and provincial ===
Rennie played with Upper Hutt RFC in Wellington, New Zealand. He finished playing early at 27 due to a recurring shoulder injury.

Rennie played with the Wellington Lions. He won the NPC title with the Lions in 1986. Later as head coach he guided the team to their next NPC title 14 years later in 2000.

=== International ===
Rennie's mother was from Rarotonga in the Cook Islands, and thus Rennie was eligible for the Cook Islands national team. He played for the Cook Islands for one non-capped match in 1990.

== Coaching career ==
Rennie has been described as "hard-nosed, doesn't tolerate fools, is astute and has a deep rugby intelligence." After playing for the amateur side Rennie then coached Upper Hutt RFC.

=== Wellington Lions ===
He became the assistant coach of the Wellington Lions in 1999 before becoming head coach in 2000. In his first year as the head coach, he led the Wellington Lions to their first NPC title since 1986. He stayed with the Lions until 2002.

=== Hurricanes ===
Rennie became first the Hurricanes Under 23 head coach and then the assistant coach of the Hurricanes. He also coached at the New Zealand international academy.

=== Manawatu ===
Originally a short-term contract, Rennie was the coach of the Manawatu Turbos in the ITM Cup from 2005 to 2011. Under Rennie the Turbos were Championship runner-up in the 2011 ITM Cup.

=== New Zealand U20 ===
Rennie was coach of New Zealand under-20s and the team won three consecutive World titles from 2008 to 2010.

=== Chiefs ===
He joined the Chiefs for the 2012 season and led them to their first ever Super Rugby title. In doing so Rennie became the first first-year Super Rugby coach to win a Super Rugby title

The day of the final itself proved highly eventful. As Rennie guided the Chiefs to a 37–6 win over the Sharks, his house was robbed and valuables were stolen. A similar opportunist theft had occurred to Chiefs player Sonny Bill Williams several weeks earlier.

He coached the Chiefs to their second straight Super Rugby title in the 2013 season, beating the Brumbies.

=== Glasgow Warriors ===
On 19 August 2016, Glasgow Warriors announced that Rennie would replace Gregor Townsend as head coach for the 2017–18 season. Under Townsend, Warriors were a top Pro12 side; they reached the play-offs in every year of his charge – except his last; where he guided the Warriors to their first European Champions Cup Quarter-Final. Townsend won the Pro12 title with Glasgow Warriors in 2015.

In Rennie's first season, Glasgow Warriors made the Pro14 semi-finals, but the side was beaten at Scotstoun Stadium by the Scarlets. In the European Champions Cup they finished bottom of their pool.

For the 2018–19 season, Glasgow Warriors reached the Pro14 final at Celtic Park in Glasgow. A large home-based Warriors support gave the Pro14 its biggest ever attendance for a final. Despite this Leinster capitalised on a Stuart Hogg error and ground out the match to win the title. In the European Champions Cup, Glasgow Warriors qualified out of the pool stages to meet Saracens in the quarter final. Having run Saracens very close at home; and matched them until the final quarter of the away pool match – Scottish hopes were raised for the quarter-final in London. However Saracens saved their best performance for that match and then went on to win the European title.

After coronavirus curtailed the 2019–20 season, Glasgow Warriors were in the 3rd place of their conference; which would have normally secured a place in the play-off finals to determine the Pro14 champion. Danny Wilson took over the head coach role on 1 June 2020. On leaving Rennie said: "It’s been good for me. I was keen to experience a different culture and a different type of footie. Rugby goes forever up here, the seasons roll into one, so you have to be very detailed around your planning. Around the international commitments you lose players for big chunks of time so you have to bring through young kids and manage a much bigger squad." Of Glasgow Warriors and Scotland he concluded: ""But it's the people I'll miss. A lot of it comes back to laughter. The Scottish are funny people and I haven't laughed as much in any environment as much as I have in my time here. I've travelled all over Scotland and had a decent look at various things. My grandfather was born in Stranraer so we spent a bit of time down there. We went up to Skye and went to Oban and went to this seafood restaurant right on the water and it was as good as any seafood I've ever tasted. I've loved the food, I've loved the people and I've loved our time here. It's been special, we'll miss it."

=== Australia ===
On 20 November 2019, Rugby Australia announced that Rennie would replace Michael Cheika as head coach of the Wallabies.

On 12 November 2022, under pressure coach Dave Rennie defended making mass changes to his team after the Wallabies were stunned in a historic first loss (28-27) to Italy in Florence.

On 16 January 2023, Rugby Australia announced that Rennie would be replaced by Eddie Jones.

=== Kobe Steelers ===
Rennie took over the Kobe Steelers in Japan for the 2023-24 season. With him as assistant was Mike Blair, previously a head coach of Edinburgh Rugby and who was an assistant coach under Rennie at Glasgow Warriors.

=== New Zealand ===
On 4 March 2026, it was announced that Rennie would take over the All Blacks head coach role ahead of the 2026 Nations Championship, replacing the previous head coach Scott Robertson who was dismissed mid-World Cup cycle.

== Honours ==
- The Rugby Championship
  - Runner-up: 2021
- Nelson Mandela Challenge Plate
  - Winner: 2021, 2022
- Puma Trophy
  - Winner: 2020, 2021, 2022
- Trophée des Bicentenaires
  - Winner: 2021
- Hopetoun Cup
  - Winner: 2022
- James Bevan Trophy
  - Winner: 2022

== Outside rugby ==
Rennie was a school teacher in Upper Hutt. He taught to 12 and 13 year olds: 'intermediate', between primary and secondary education. In comparing his former job of teaching with coaching rugby union, Rennie said: "Teaching, coaching, it's the same thing. The kids are just a bit bigger.".

While coaching Upper Hutt RFC at amateur level, Rennie owned and ran a pub called the Lonely Goat Herd in Upper Hutt, Wellington.

Rennie plays guitar and also enjoys landscape gardening.

Sporting positions
| Preceded by Michael Cheika | Australian national rugby union coach 2019–2023 | Succeeded by Eddie Jones |
| Preceded by Scott Robertson | All Blacks coach 2026–present | Incumbent |
