= Brando Va'aulu =

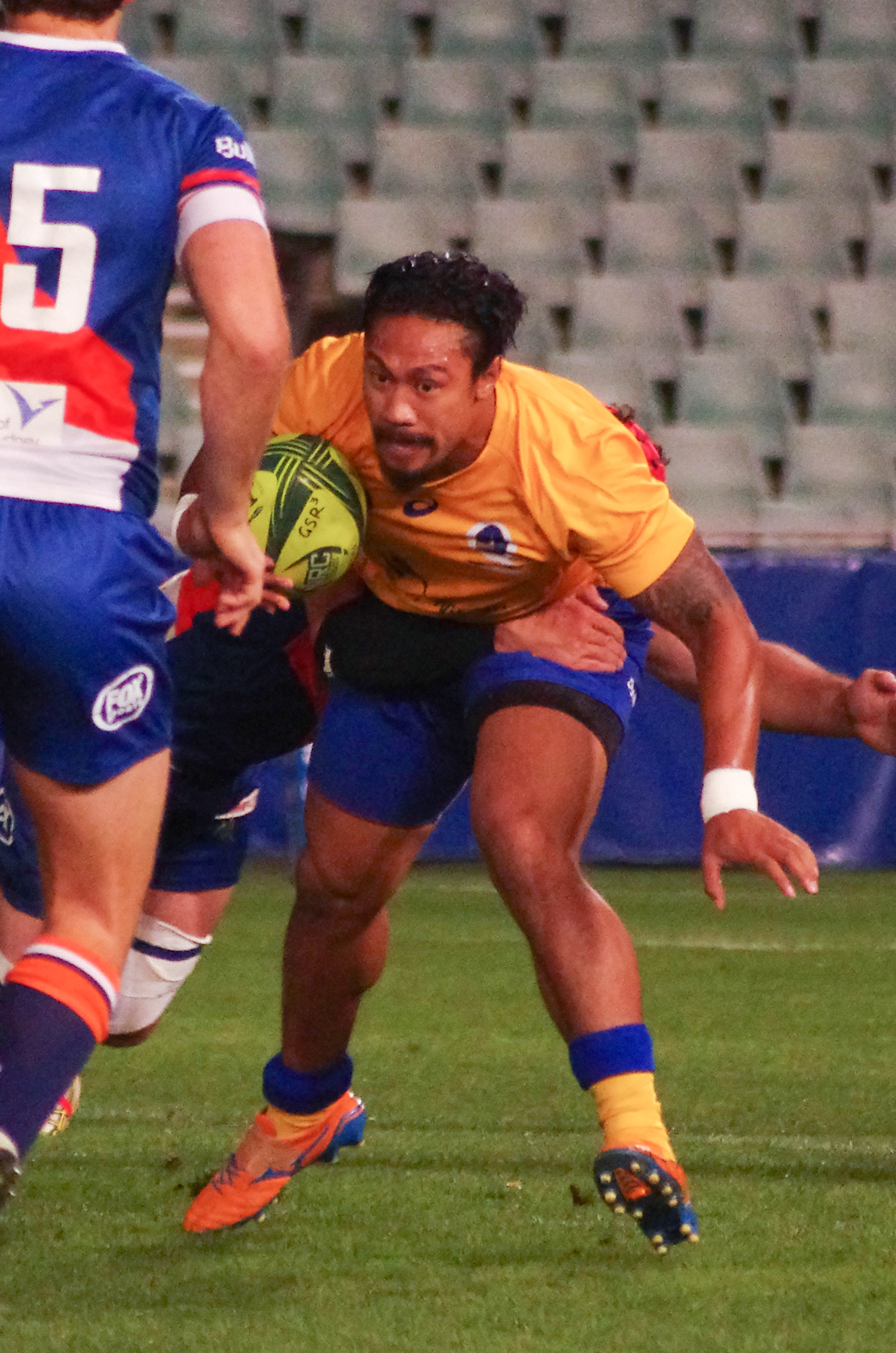
- Born: Brando W. F. Va'aulu; 3 May 1987 (age 39) Auckland, New Zealand
- Height: 1.79 m (5 ft 10 in)
- Weight: 94 kg (14 st 11 lb; 207 lb)
- School: Brisbane State High School

Rugby union career
- Position(s): Wing, Centre, Fullback
Senior career
Years	Team	Apps	(Points)
2010–2011	Bourgoin	10	(5)
2011–2014	Tokyo Gas		
2014	Brisbane City	7	(10)
- Correct as of 1 December 2014
Super Rugby
Years	Team	Apps	(Points)
2006–2010	Reds	34	(5)
International career
Years	Team	Apps	(Points)
2013–	Samoa	6	(10)

Brando Va'aulu (born 3 May 1987) a junior product of Sunnybank Rugby Union Club. A former Samoan rugby union player whom previously played for the Reds in Super Rugby.

== Career ==
Born in Auckland, New Zealand, Va'aulu's position of choice is as a wing. He was selected to go on the UK Tour with the Australian Schools side. He was a member of the Australian Youth Commonwealth 7s, Under 19 World Cup and Inaugural NRC winning sides.

He was the Reds Rookie of the year in 2007.

Represented Manu Samoa in 2010.
