= Jim McKay (rugby union) =

Australian rugby union coach

- Born: 1966 (age 59–60) Sydney Australia
- School: Wakehurst Public School, The Forest High School

Rugby union career
- Position: Head coach
- Current team: Brisbane City
Coaching career
- Years: Team
- 1999–2002: Henley Hawks, England (director of rugby)
- 2004–2008: Cornish Pirates, England
- 2008–2009: Leicester Tigers, England (Academy Coach)
- 2009–2013: Queensland Reds, Australia (Assistant Coach)
- 2013–2014: Australia (Attack Coach)
- 2015: Worcester Warriors, England (Coaching Consultant)
- 2015: Tonga (Coaching Consultant)
- 2016–2018: Kobelco Steelers, Japan (Head Coach)
- 2018–: Queensland Reds, Australia (assistant coach)
- 2019–: Brisbane City

Jim McKay is an Australian professional rugby union football coach, with international experience. He is currently the head coach of the Brisbane City team that plays in the NRC competition, and also assistant coach of the Queensland Reds assisting the Reds to premierships in 2011 and 2021. Former assistant coach Australian Wallabies Rugby Union Football team. McKay had previously coached the Cornish Pirates UK and Kobelco Steelers Japan.
