= Neil Herron =

Scottish rugby union player

- Born: Neil Herron; 1 June 1994 (age 32) Scotland
- Height: 6 ft 0 in (1.83 m)
- Weight: 91 kg (14 st 5 lb)
- School: Jordanhill School

Rugby union career
- Position: Centre
Amateur team(s)
Years	Team	Apps	(Points)
- West of Scotland
2014–	Glasgow Hawks		
- Correct as of 12 July 2015
International career
Years	Team	Apps	(Points)
2014	Scotland 7s	1	
2014	Scotland U20	5	
2012	Scotland U18		
2011	Scotland U17		
- Correct as of 12 July 2015
National sevens team
Years	Team		Comps
2014–	Scotland 7s		1

Neil Herron (born 1 June 1994) is a Scottish rugby union player at the Centre position.

Herron has represented Scotland at under-17, under-18, under-20 levels and on the Scotland 7s.

He played for West of Scotland and Glasgow Hawks. He secured a 7s Elite Development Programme place in 2012 with West of Scotland and secured another EDP placement in 2013 and 2014 with Glasgow Warriors.

The EDP contract signed allowed Herron to play for Glasgow Hawks if not playing for the Glasgow Warriors.
