= Johnny Matthews (rugby union) =

Professional rugby union player

- Born: 5 July 1993 (age 33) Liverpool, England
- Height: 6 ft 0 in (1.83 m)
- Weight: 107 kg (236 lb; 16 st 12 lb)

Rugby union career
- Position: Hooker
Senior career
Years	Team	Apps	(Points)
2014–15	Rotherham Titans	3	(0)
2019–26	Glasgow Warriors	109	(265)
2026-	US Montauban		
International career
Years	Team	Apps	(Points)
2018	Scotland Club XV		
2022	Scotland A	1	(0)
2023–	Scotland	2	(5)
- Correct as of 19 November 2024

Johnny Matthews (born 5 July 1993) is a professional rugby union player who plays for US Montauban. His usual position is at hooker. Born in Liverpool, England, he plays for the Scotland national team.

== Rugby Union career ==
=== Amateur career ===
Matthews played for Sedgley Park in the season 2016–17. He scored 26 tries in 29 appearances. While with Yorkshire Carnegie he played for Otley.

On moving to Scotland in 2017 Matthews played for Boroughmuir. He finished the Scottish Premiership's top try scorer for 2018–19 season.

=== Professional career ===
From Sedgley Park, Matthews moved to Yorkshire Carnegie. He then played for Sale Jets, the Sale Sharks 2XV.

Matthews was a back-up player for Edinburgh.

It was announced on 6 September that Matthews had signed a professional contract with Glasgow Warriors for short-term cover over the 2019 Rugby World Cup; when Glasgow lose around 15 of their players to the national squads involved in the tournament.

Matthews said of the Warriors move: "I’m absolutely delighted to sign. Glasgow is one of the biggest clubs in Europe and I’m looking forward to hopefully getting a few games under my belt while I’m here."

Matthews made his debut for Glasgow Warriors in their opening match of the 2019-20 season - against Ulster at Kingspan Stadium, Belfast on 7 September 2019.

Matthews scored his first try for the club in the return match in a 36–33 victory at Scotstoun Stadium.

On 29 November 2019 it was confirmed that Matthews' Glasgow Warriors contract will be extended to the rest of the 2019–20 season.

On 1 April 2023, Matthews scored a quintet of tries against Dragons in the European Challenge Cup - a Warriors record.

He left Glasgow Warriors at the end of season 2025-26. He left a Warriors centurion with 109 caps. He scored 53 tries in his time at the Warriors and is the Warriors leading forward player try-scorer. He joined French side Montauban on a 3 year deal.

=== International career ===
Matthews was born in England, but qualifies to play for Scotland as his mother is from Glasgow. He has represented Scotland at Under 18 and at Club XV levels.

He was called up to the Scotland squad for the 2022 summer tour on 17 June 2022.

He was capped by Scotland A on 25 June 2022 in their match against Chile.

He was called up to the Scotland World Cup squad in September 2023 after an injury to Stuart McInally and made his Scotland debut against Romania on 30 September 2023 when he scored Scotland's tenth try of the game.

His second cap came over one year later when he appeared as a substitute in Scotland's autumn international match against Portugal on 16 November 2024.

=== Administrative career ===
Matthews studied Sports Marketing at Leeds Beckett University.

He was a Rugby Development Officer at North Berwick RFC from 2017 to 2018.

Matthews was the Commercial and Community Development Manager at Boroughmuir from 2018 to 2019.

On 19 January 2022, Matthews took the position of Commercial Manager of Watsonians.
