= Jale Vakaloloma =

Fijian rugby union player (born 1996)

Jale Railala Vakaloloma
- Born: Jale Railala Naulu Volau Vakaloloma; 10 August 1996 (age 30) Fiji
- Height: 6 ft 5 in (1.96 m)
- Weight: 125 kg (19 st 10 lb)
- School: Lelean Memorial School
- University: Fiji National University

Rugby union career
- Position: Flanker
- Current team: San Diego Legion
Amateur team(s)
Years	Team	Apps	(Points)
2018-19	Easts		
Senior career
Years	Team	Apps	(Points)
2018–2019	Brisbane City	1	(0)
2019–2020	Glasgow Warriors	0	(0)
2023–	San Diego Legion		
Super Rugby
Years	Team	Apps	(Points)
2020	Boroughmuir Bears	1	(0)
2020	Stirling County	1	(0)
International career
Years	Team	Apps	(Points)
2018	Fiji 'A'		

Jale Railala Vakaloloma (born 10 August 1996) is a Fijian rugby league for the New York Knights in the USA Rugby League as a Prop. He previously played rugby union for the Glasgow Warriors in the Pro14 competition and San Diego Legion in the Major League Rugby (MLR). He plays primarily as a Blindside flanker.

== Rugby Union career ==
=== Amateur career ===
Vakaloloma played for Easts in Australia.

=== Professional career ===
He also represented Brisbane City in the 2018 National Rugby Championship.

He signed for Glasgow Warriors on 18 July 2019.

He played for two sides in Scotland's professional Super 6 league in 2020 on his return from shoulder injury:- Boroughmuir Bears and Stirling County.

On 1 October 2020 it was announced that he had been released by Glasgow Warriors.

=== International career ===
He was called up and played 3 matches from the bench for Fiji 'A' in 2018 and is thus tied to Fiji.

He has been called up to the Fiji world cup training squad for 2019.
