= Lars Morrice =

New Zealand rugby union player

- Born: Lars Morrice c. 1996 New Zealand
- Height: 6 ft 6 in (1.98 m)
- Weight: 115 kg (18 st 2 lb)
- University: University of Waikato

Rugby union career
- Position: Lock
Amateur team(s)
Years	Team	Apps	(Points)
- Te Puke Sports
2016	Hong Kong Scottish		
2018-	Ayr		
Senior career
Years	Team	Apps	(Points)
2019-	Glasgow Warriors		
Provincial / State sides
Years	Team	Apps	(Points)
- Bay of Plenty Steamers
Super Rugby
Years	Team	Apps	(Points)
- Chiefs

Lars Morrice is a rugby union player who plays for the Ayrshire Bulls and Glasgow Warriors. His usual position is at the Lock position. Morrice was born in New Zealand but is Scottish-qualified.

== Rugby Union career ==
=== Amateur career ===
Morrice played for Te Puke Sports Club in the Bay of Plenty province in New Zealand.

As part of a deal between the Chiefs and the Hong Kong side, Morrice played for Hong Kong Scottish.

Morrice joined Ayr in November 2018. In the 2018-19 Ayr won the Scottish Premiership and the Scottish Cup.

Ayr now play in the Super 6 league as the Ayrshire Bulls. Ayr's Head Coach Peter Murchie stated: "It is great news that Lars is signed up for the Ayrshire Bulls. Lars made a big impact for Ayr RFC last season and it is great to see another Scottish-qualified talent want to stay in Scotland.

"Lars is training with Glasgow Warriors at the moment, which is great for his development and I am sure we will see the benefits of that this coming season."

=== Professional career ===
After impressing at Te Puke, Morrice played for Bay of Plenty Steamers.

While with the Steamers, Morrice was signed to the Chiefs development squad.

Morrice joined Glasgow Warriors in the 2019-20 preseason; having trained with club over the summer.

He made his debut for Glasgow Warriors against Ulster Rugby on 7 September 2019, coming off the bench in a pre-season match at the Kingspan Stadium. Ulster won the match 50 - 19.

== Outside of rugby ==
Morrice has a Bachelor of Business Analysis from the University of Waikato.
