= Danny Wilson (rugby union) =

English rugby union player & coach

- Born: 31 July 1976 (age 50) Weston-super-Mare, England

Rugby union career
- Position: Hooker
Amateur team(s)
Years	Team	Apps	(Points)
-	Hornets		
–	Cardiff Metropolitan University		
–	Treorchy		
Senior career
Years	Team	Apps	(Points)
-	Bristol U21		
Coaching career
- Years: Team
- 2008–10: London Welsh
- 2010–12: Newport Gwent Dragons (forwards coach)
- 2012: Wales U20
- 2012–14: Scarlets (forwards coach)
- 2014–15: Bristol (forwards coach)
- 2015–18: Cardiff Blues
- 2018–20: Scotland (forwards coach)
- 2020–22: Glasgow Warriors
- 2023–2025: Harlequins (Head coach)
- 2025–: Wales (assistant coach)

Danny Wilson is a professional rugby union coach and former player. He is currently an assistant coach for Wales having previously been head coach for Prem Rugby side Harlequins.

He was born in the West Country in Somerset, near Weston-super-Mare, England. As a player he turned out at Hooker.

== Playing career ==
=== Amateur career ===
Wilson began playing rugby union for a couple of Weston-super-Mare sides; Hornets and Weston-super-Mare. He moved to Cardiff to study and then played for Cardiff Metropolitan University.

He also played a year with Treorchy.

=== Professional career ===
Wilson played for Bristol Bears under 21 side.

== Coaching career ==
=== Club ===
A degenerative disc problem in his back ended Wilson's playing career at the age of 25; and Wilson moved into coaching.

He secured a job coaching at Cardiff Blues academy before being named as London Welsh head coach in 2008.

Wilson has coached three of the four Welsh regions being forwards coach at Newport Gwent Dragons and the Scarlets before taking over as head coach at the Cardiff Blues in 2015, replacing Mark Hammett in the role.

Wilson from 2014 to 2015 was Bristol's forwards coach, working under former England coach Andy Robinson. However, in 2015 he left the club after they failed to gain promotion from the RFU Championship, to join the Cardiff Blues as head coach.

After three seasons in Cardiff, it was announced that he would be leaving at the end of the 2017/18 season to join Wasps as Forwards coach. He subsequently pulled out of that deal with Wasps, when the Forwards coach role with the Scotland team became available.

==== Glasgow Warriors ====
In 20 November 2019, Wilson was announced as the new head coach of Glasgow Warriors for the 2020-21 season, succeeding Dave Rennie.

Wilson stated: “I’ve been extremely impressed with the Scottish system in recent years and I’m looking forward to working with an exciting and talented squad of players at the Warriors. I want to build on the high-tempo style of play that I know the fans love and pay to see week in, week out."

He officially took over as head coach of Glasgow Warriors on 1 June 2020.

Glasgow Warriors finished 8th in the league in the 2021-22 season, and following a huge 76-14 loss against Leinster in the quarter-finals - the second worse loss in the team's history - on 6 June 2022, Wilson was relieved of his position as head coach.

Leicester Tigers

From January to June 2023 Wilson acted as a consultant to Leicester Tigers supporting temporary team manager Richard Wigglesworth.

==== Harlequins ====
Wilson joined Harlequins as a lineout and contact coach on 12 January 2023. Ahead of the 2023-24 season, he was made Head Coach at the club but will remain responsible for the lineout and contact areas.

In April 2024, Wilson oversaw Harlequins first ever knockout stage victory in the Champions Cup, beating his former side Glasgow Warriors 28–24 in the Round of 16. The following week, he oversaw the quarter final victory in the competition, beating Bordeaux Bègles 42–41 away to reach the semi finals of the competition for the first time since the club was founded.

In March 2025, he guided the club to their first away victory in the league over rivals Saracens since 2012. This was also the first time the club had done the double over them since the 2008–09 season.

In September 2025, with just 15 days to go before the beginning of the 2025–26 season, he left his position at Harlequins to become an assistant coach with Wales.

=== International ===
Wilson also coached the Wales U20s team in the 2012 Junior World Championship where the Welsh side defeated the Baby Blacks 9-6 in the group stage. Wales were knocked out in the semi-finals by the Baby Blacks but claimed the Bronze medal defeating Argentina in the third place playoff.

It was announced in 2018 that he would be joining the Scottish National side coaching team as forwards coach.

== Personal life ==
While playing in Wales, Wilson married Welsh international player Rachel Poolman.
