= Nick Frisby =

Australia international rugby union player

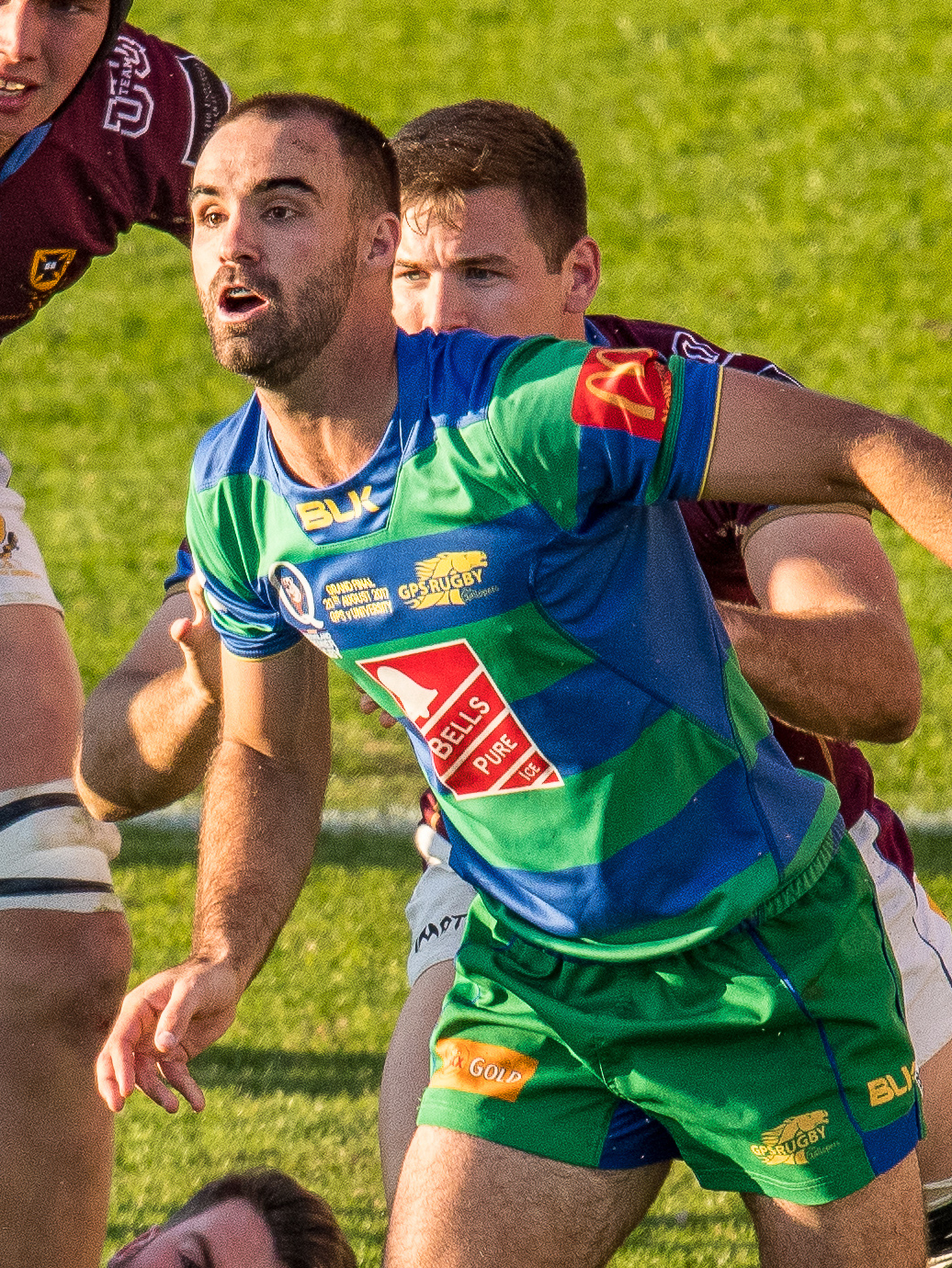
- Frisby with GPS in the 2017 Hospital Cup
- Born: Nicholas Frisby; 29 October 1992 (age 34) Brisbane, Queensland, Australia
- Height: 1.84 m (6 ft 1/2 in)
- Weight: 84 kg (13 st 3 lb; 185 lb)
- School: Marist College Ashgrove

Rugby union career
- Position(s): Scrum-half, Fly-half
Amateur team(s)
Years	Team	Apps	(Points)
- GPS
2018–2019	Stirling County		
Senior career
Years	Team	Apps	(Points)
2014–2017	Brisbane City	23	(26)
2018	Bordeaux Bègles	9	(5)
2018–2020	Glasgow Warriors	21	(20)
Super Rugby
Years	Team	Apps	(Points)
2012–2017	Reds	66	(69)
2020	Force	5	(0)
International career
Years	Team	Apps	(Points)
2012	Australia U20		
2016	Australia	5	(0)

Nick Frisby (born 29 October 1992) is an Australian former rugby union player who most recently played with the Western Force in the Super Rugby. His playing position was scrum-half.

== Career ==
=== Amateur career ===
Frisby's local club side was GPS Rugby, who play in the Queensland Premier Rugby Competition.

Frsiby has been drafted to Stirling County in the Scottish Premiership for the 2018–19 season.

=== Professional career ===
Nick Frisby made his debut for the Queensland Reds against the Sharks of Durban in round 4 of the 2012 Super Rugby season at Suncorp Stadium. Frisby came off the bench in the 47th minute of the match going on to play 33 minutes. Unfortunately it was not a dream debut even after scoring a try with the Reds losing 22–27.

In the 2014 National Rugby Championship (NRC) Frisby was one of the competition's best, turning out for Brisbane City leading them to their inaugural title in a 37–26 victory over the Perth Spirit at Ballymore Stadium.

During a disappointing 2015 season for the Queensland Reds team, Frisby started seven matches at flyhalf due to the unavailability of injured star Quade Cooper. Frisby playing out of position earned praise for his efforts so much so being invited into a Wallabies training in Brisbane with head coach Michael Cheika.

Prior to 2016, Frisby gained the majority of his Queensland Reds caps on the bench being the second pick scrum-half to Will Genia.

On 7 July 2018 it was announced that Frisby was signed by Glasgow Warriors.

He made his first appearance for the Warriors in their 50 -17 demolition of Harlequins at North Inch, Perth on 18 August 2018, even scoring on debut.

== International career ==
Frisby was named in the Australia under 20 team that competed in the 2012 IRB Junior World Championship in South Africa. Nick Frisby has earned his first Wallabies squad call-up in 2016, after an impressive Super Rugby season with the Reds. Frisby has played a number of roles for Queensland in recent years but with the departure of Will Genia has made the starting nine spot his own, catching the eye of Michael Cheika. During 2016, Frisby played in all 3 test matches against England as well as the Bledisode Cup against the All Blacks and went on to travel and play on the Wallabies Spring tour.
