= Brisbane City (rugby union) =

Australian rugby union club, based in Brisbane

- Founded: 2014
- Disbanded: 2020 (competition disbanded)
- Location: Brisbane, Australia
Ground
GPS Rugby Club	(Capacity: 3,000)
Bond University	(Capacity: 6,000)
Ballymore	(Capacity: 18,000)
Easts Rugby Club	(Capacity: 3,000)
- Coach: Jim McKay
- Captain: Fraser McReight
- League: National Rugby Championship
- 2019: 4th
1st kit	2nd kit

Brisbane City is an Australian rugby union football team based in Brisbane that competed in the National Rugby Championship (NRC). The team is one of two Queensland sides in the competition, the other being Queensland Country. Brisbane City is organised and managed by the Queensland Rugby Union (QRU), with the coaching and training programs utilised by the Queensland Reds being extended to players joining the team from the Reds and Queensland Premier Rugby teams.

The Brisbane City team in the NRC takes its identity from the metropolitan rugby team that has represented Brisbane for more than a century. The representative team's colours and a similar logo were inherited for the NRC. The Brisbane City uniform is yellow and blue, with a crest of the City Hall logo within Queensland Rugby's traditional 'Q' on the jersey's chest.

The NRC was launched in 2014, reinstating the national competition after the Australian Rugby Championship (ARC) was discontinued following the first season in 2007. The Brisbane City NRC team utilises existing QRU staffing roles and infrastructure, with the team's home ground and training base located at QRU's headquarters at Ballymore.

== History ==
Brisbane's earliest recorded intercity football match under Rugby Union rules took place on 19 August 1878 when Brisbane FC played Ipswich FC. The teams played again three weeks later under Victorian Rules. This was five years before the foundation of the Northern Rugby Union (the NRU, which was later to become the QRU). In the early years of rugby in Queensland, teams from country areas such as Toowoomba, Rockhampton and Charters Towers were Brisbane's main on-field rivals.

=== Representative team ===
Brisbane representative sides have been selected from the premier clubs in the city's competition for more than a hundred years to play teams from other areas of Queensland as well as international and provincial touring sides. A Brisbane Metropolitan side played the visiting British Isles team in 1904, and later Brisbane representative teams played the All Blacks in 1951 and Fiji in 1954.

The first City-Country rugby match between Brisbane and Queensland Country (selected from the rest of Queensland) was held at the inaugural Country Week carnival hosted by the QRU in 1902. Country Week carnivals became sporadic with the rise of rugby league after 1909, and the start of the First World War brought rugby union to a halt in Queensland in 1914. The QRU was revived in 1928–29, but rugby languished in country regions of the state for many years.

City-Country matches were resumed in 1965. From 1968 until 1982, annual Country Carnival competitions were held from which the Country team was selected to play Brisbane and other representative sides. The Country Carnival was discontinued in favour of State Championships in 1983, and the format of competition has varied over time, but City-Country matches between representative teams from Brisbane and Queensland Country have remained regular fixtures since.

=== Ballymore Tornadoes (ARC team) ===
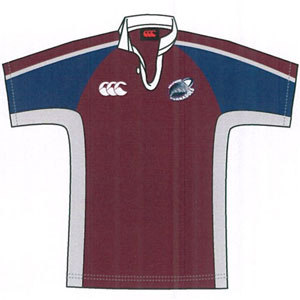
Tornadoes logo and jersey in ARC 2007.

In 2006, after setting up a consultative process culminating in a working session of some 70 delegates from around the country, the Australian Rugby Union announced that a new, eight-team national competition would commence in 2007 to compete for the Australian Rugby Championship (ARC).

The Ballymore Tornadoes was the Brisbane-based team in the ARC, and the team played its home matches at Ballymore Stadium. The team's colours were maroon, blue and silver. The Ballymore Tornadoes side was one of two Queensland teams supported by the QRU in the competition, alongside the East Coast Aces.

Queensland's two teams in the ARC were aligned with existing clubs and regions. The Tornadoes were aligned with six Queensland Premier Rugby clubs north of the Brisbane River – Brothers, GPS, Norths/QUT, Sunshine Coast, University and Wests. Chris Roche, a former Wallaby who played 17 Tests as well as 49 matches for the Reds during the 1980s, was the head coach of the Tornadoes. Paul Healy was the assistant coach.

The Australian Rugby Championship was terminated at the end of 2007 after only one season of competition, with the Australian Rugby Union citing higher costs than budgeted and further projected financial losses. The Tornadoes team was disbanded with the end of the ARC competition.

=== National Rugby Championship ===
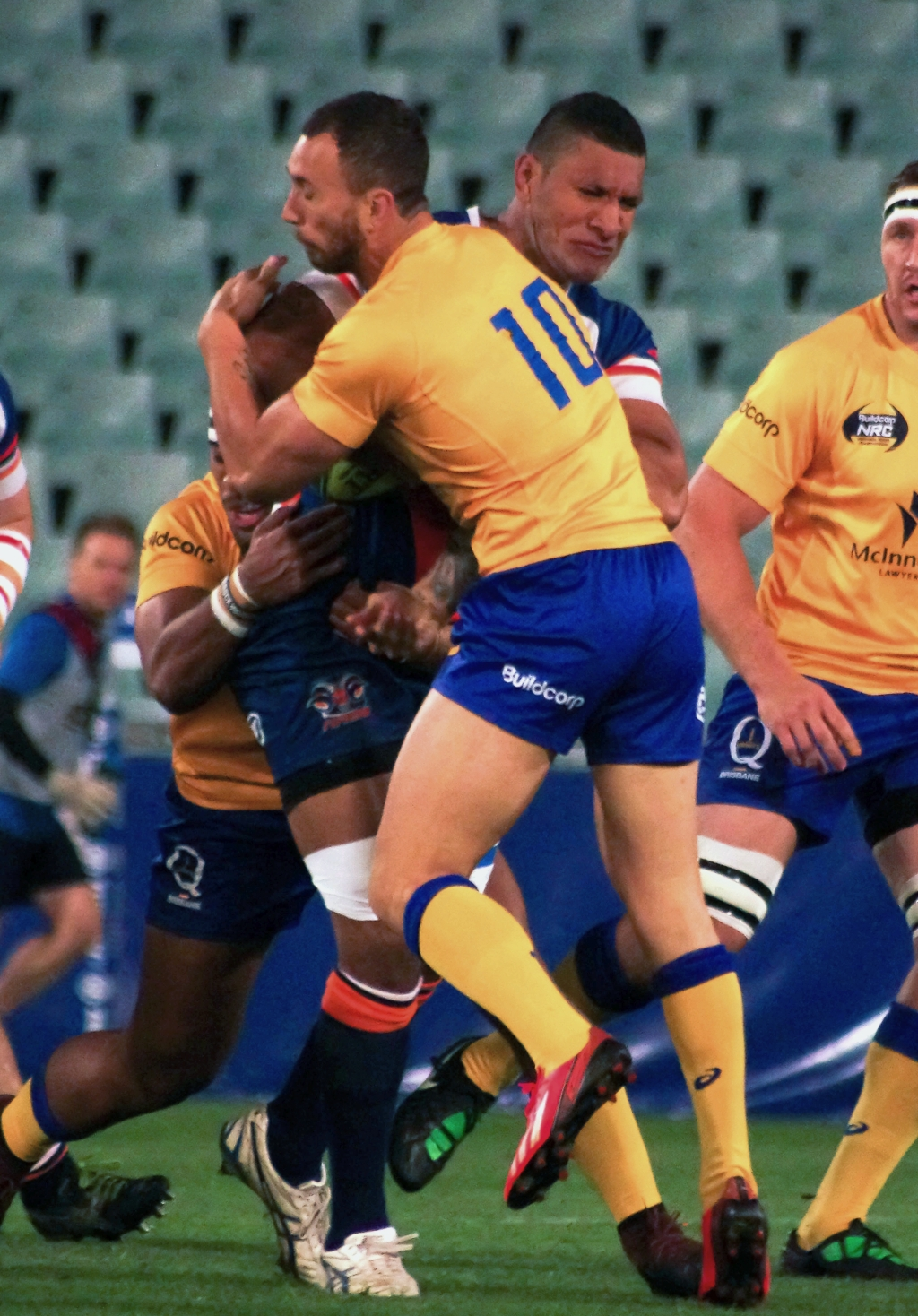
Quade Cooper makes a tackle for Brisbane City in NRC 2014

In December 2013, the ARU announced that the national competition was to be relaunched, with the National Rugby Championship (NRC) commencing in 2014. Expressions of interest were open to any interested parties, with the accepted bids finalised in early 2014. There was initial interest from Brisbane clubs in forming NRC teams themselves, but to eliminate the risks to sub-unions and clubs the Queensland Rugby Union decided to organise and manage two teams centrally for the first year of the competition. On 24 March 2014, it was announced that the Brisbane City and Queensland Country teams would play in the NRC competition.

Brisbane City secured McInnes Wilson Lawyers as principal sponsor for the 2014 NRC season.

== Stadium ==
The home ground for the Brisbane City team is Ballymore. The stadium was built in 1966 and is the traditional home of Queensland Rugby. The Queensland Reds played their home matches in the Super Rugby competition at Ballymore until the end of the 2005 season, before they moved to the larger Suncorp Stadium for 2006. Ballymore has a capacity of around 24,000. Test matches have also been played at Ballymore, including Bledisloe Cup matches, and a semi-final of the 1987 Rugby World Cup.

Brisbane City also played a home game at Suncorp Stadium in 2014, as the curtain raiser to the Bledisloe Cup match.

== Current squad ==
Brisbane City – NRC 2019 (Note: Initial squad was named in late August.)
Prop: (Tonga) **David Feao**; (Australia) Josh Nasser; (South Africa) Ruan Smith; (Australia) Rhys van Nek; (Australia) Dane Zander; Hooker: (Australia) Sean Farrell; (Tonga) Maile Ngauamo; (Australia) **Brandon Paenga-Amosa**; Lock: (Australia) Brad Kapa; (Australia) Robert Puliuvea; (Australia) Ryan Smith; (Australia) Tuaina Taii Tualima; (Australia) Michael Wood; Backrow: (Australia) Connor Anderson (Note: Watson and Anderson weren't in the original squad but were named in the team for Round 3.); (Australia) Adam Korczyk; (Australia) Fraser McReight (c); (Fiji) Seru Uru; (Australia) Sam Wallis	Scrum-half: (Australia) Nick Chapman; (Australia) Phoenix Hunt; (Australia) Moses Sorovi; Fly-half: (Australia) Isaac Henry; (Australia) Isaac Lucas; Centre: (Fiji) Ilasia Droasese; (Australia) Maaloga Konelio; (Samoa) Hunter Paisami; (Fiji) **Teti Tela**; (Australia) Brad Twidale; Wing: (Australia) Lawson Creighton; (Australia) Jordan Luke; (Australia) **Sefa Naivalu**; (Australia) Liam McNamara; (Australia) Ashton Watson; Fullback: (Australia) Bryce Hegarty; Notes:
**Bold** denotes player is internationally capped. (c) Denotes team captain. ^{1} denotes marquee player.

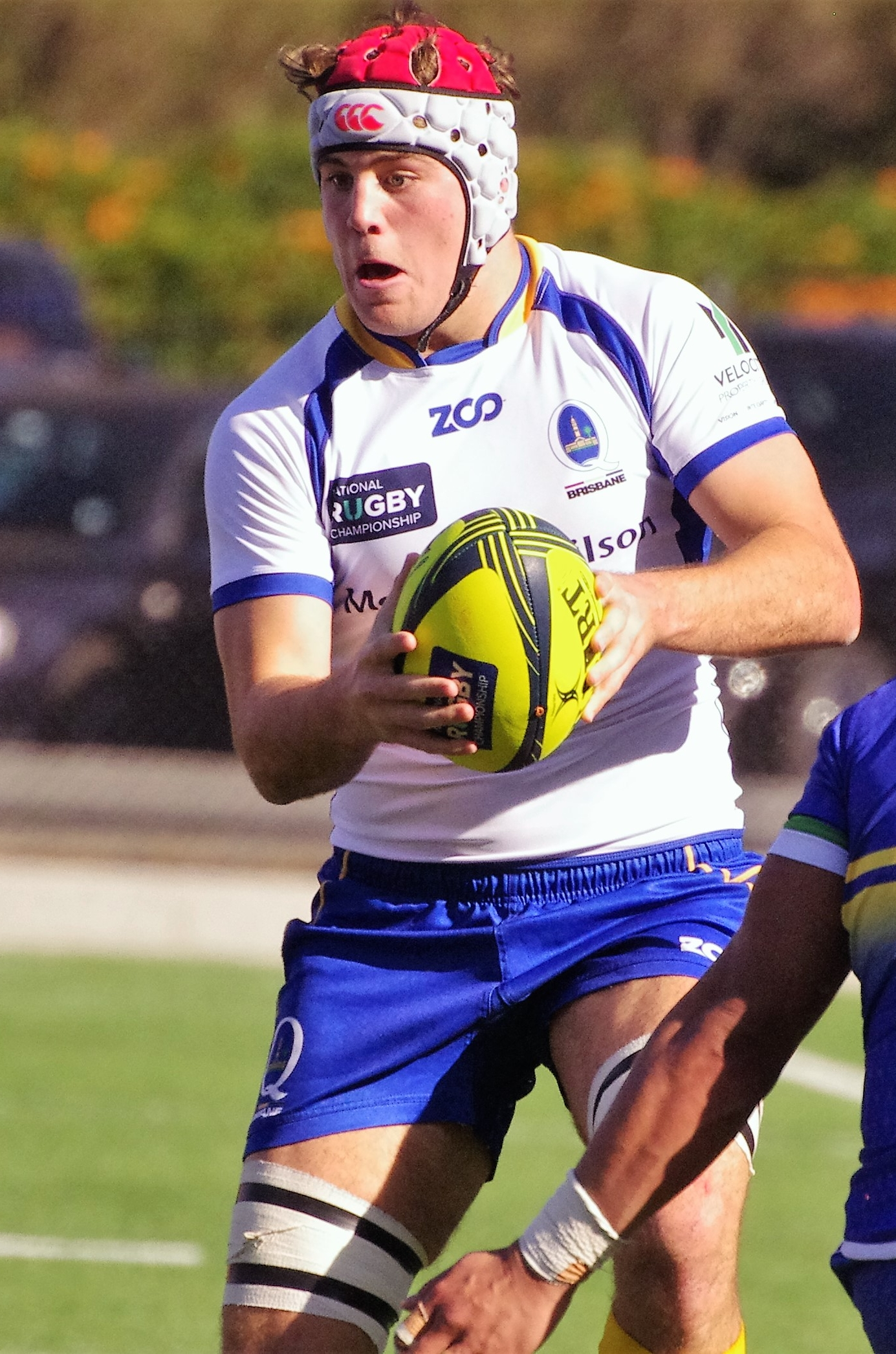
Fraser McReight in 2018.

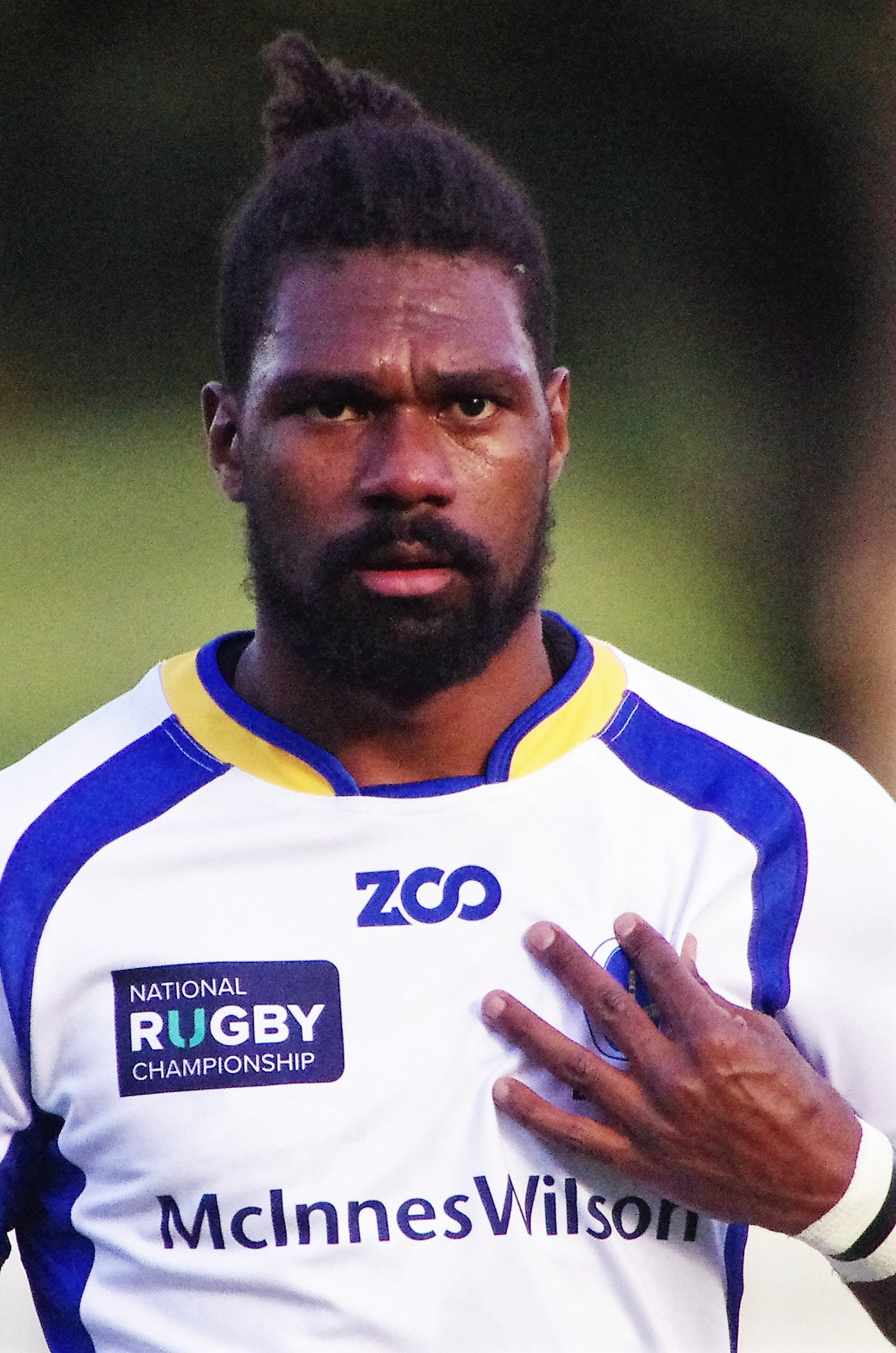
Scrum-half Moses Sorovi.

== Records ==
=== Honours ===
- **National Rugby Championship**
  - Champions (2): 2014, 2015
- **Horan-Little Shield**
  - Season winners: 2015

=== Season standings ===
National Rugby Championship

Year	Pos	Pld	W	D	L	F	A	+/-	BP	Pts	Play-offs
2019	4th	7	3	1	3	214	199	+15	3	17	Semi final away loss to Western Force by 42–38
2018	5th	7	4	0	3	205	245	−40	2	18	Did not compete
2017	6th	8	4	1	3	281	291	–10	2	20	Did not compete
2016	7th	7	2	0	5	216	306	−90	1	9	Did not compete
2015	1st	8	8	0	0	400	174	+226	6	38	Grand final win over Canberra Vikings by 21–10
2014	3rd	8	6	0	2	295	257	+38	2	26	Grand final win over Perth Spirit by 37–26

Australian Rugby Championship (Tornadoes)

Year	Pos	Pld	W	D	L	F	A	+/-	BP	Pts	Play-offs
2007	**7th**	8	2	0	6	180	229	-49	3	**11**	Did not compete

=== Head coaches ===
- Jim McKay (2019–present)
- Mick Heenan (2017–2018)
- Rod Seib (2016)
- Nick Stiles (2014–2015)

=== Captains ===
- Fraser McReight (2019–present)
- Adam Korczyk (2018)
- Andrew Ready (2017)
- Sam Talakai (2016)
- Liam Gill (2015)
- David McDuling (2014)

=== Squads ===
2016 Brisbane City squad – NRC
The squad for the 2016 National Rugby Championship:
**Props**: Feao Fotuaika; Tonga Ma’afu; Pettowa Paraka; Sam Talakai (c); Markus Vanzati; **Hookers**: Matt Mafi; Andrew Ready; **Locks**: **Kane Douglas**^{1}; David Findlay-Henaway; Jeremiah Lynch; Brendan Mitchell; Lukhan Tui	**Loose forwards**: Luke Beauchamp; Jack de Guingand; Michael Gunn; **Leroy Houston**; Isi Naisarani; Tuaina Tualima; Criff Tupou; **Scrum-halves**: **Nick Frisby**^{1}; Harry Nucifora; Moses Sorovi; **Fly-halves**: Jake McIntyre; Jake Strachan	**Centres**: Levi Aumua; **Samu Kerevi**^{1}; Nathan Russell; Toby White; **Wingers**: Alex Gibbon; Chris Kuridrani; Brad Lacey; Junior Laloifi; **Fullbacks**: Karmichael Hunt; Patrick James; Notes: (c) Team captain **Bold** denotes internationally capped players at the time^{1} National player additional to contracted squad.^{WTS} Wider Training Squad.

2015 Brisbane City squad – NRC
The squad for the 2015 National Rugby Championship season:
**Props**: Feao Fotuaika; Ryan Freeney; Pettowa Paraka; Sam Talakai; Benroy Sala^{WTS}; Markus Vanzati; **Hookers**: Alex Casey; Matt Mafi; Andrew Ready; **Locks**: **James Horwill**^{1}; Ben Hyne; James Moore; Caderyn Neville; Corey Thomas	**Loose forwards**: Luke Beauchamp; **Liam Gill** (c); **Scott Higginbotham**^{1}; Adam Korczyk; Chazz Mahina; Ted Postal^{WTS}; Michael Richards; Waita Setu; Criff Tupou; **Scrum-halves**: Nick Frisby; **Will Genia**^{1}; Moses Sorovi; Tim Smith; **Fly-halves**: James Dalgleish; Jake McIntyre; **Quade Cooper**^{1}	**Centres**: Karmichael Hunt; Samu Kerevi; Henry Taefu; Toby White; **Wingers**: Alex Gibbon; Chris Kuridrani; Junior Laloifi; **James O'Connor**; Mika Tela; **Fullbacks**: Patrick James; Andrew Muirhead^{WTS}; Notes: (c) Team captain **Bold** denotes internationally capped players at the time^{1} National player additional to contracted squad.^{WTS} Wider Training Squad.

2014 Brisbane City squad – NRC
The squad for the 2014 National Rugby Championship season:
**Props**: Sef Fa'agase; David Feao; Phil Kite; Pettowa Paraka; Sam Talakai; **Hookers**: **James Hanson**; Matthew Mafi; Andrew Ready; **Locks**: Tim Buchanan; Daniel Gorman; **James Horwill**^{1}; Marco Kotze; David McDuling (c); Sam Rochester	**Loose forwards**: Curtis Browning; Michael Gunn; Adam Korczyk; Chazz Mahina; **Jake Schatz**; Brad Wilkin; **Scrum-halves**: Nick Frisby; **Will Genia**^{1}; Jack Mullins; Will Thompson; **Fly-halves**: **Quade Cooper**; James Dalgleish; Sam Greene; Jake McIntyre	**Centres**: Samu Kerevi; **Ben Tapuai**; Toby White; **Wingers**: Chris Kuridrani; Junior Laloifi; Harry Parker; Rex Tapuai; **Lachie Turner**; **Fullbacks**: Matthew Feaunati; **Brando Va'aulu**; Notes: (c) Team captain **Bold** denotes internationally capped players at the time^{1} National player additional to contracted squad.^{WTS} Wider Training Squad.

2007 Ballymore Tornadoes squad – ARC
**Props**: Ben Coutts; **Greg Holmes**; Peter Loane; Brett Naylor; Shon Siemonek; Ernest Skelton; **Hookers**: Geoff Abram; **Sean Hardman**; Joshua Mann-Rea; **Locks**: Jared Hanna; **James Horwill**; Tristan Hill; Daniel Linde; Ed O'Donoghue	**Loose forwards**: Leroy Houston; Steve Miller; Tom McVerry; Ray Stowers; Scott Higginbotham; Charles Wyllie; **Scrum-halves**: **Sam Cordingley**; Will Genia; Brendan McKibbin; **Fly-halves**: David Collis; Berrick Barnes; Peter Hynes	**Centres**: Blair Connor; Brett Gillespie; Byron Roberts; Tim Sampson; Donovan Slade; **Wings**: Paul Doneley; Elia Tuqiri; Anthony Sauer; **Fullbacks**: Clinton Schifcofske; Notes: (c) Team captain **Bold** denotes internationally capped players at the time

== Gallery ==
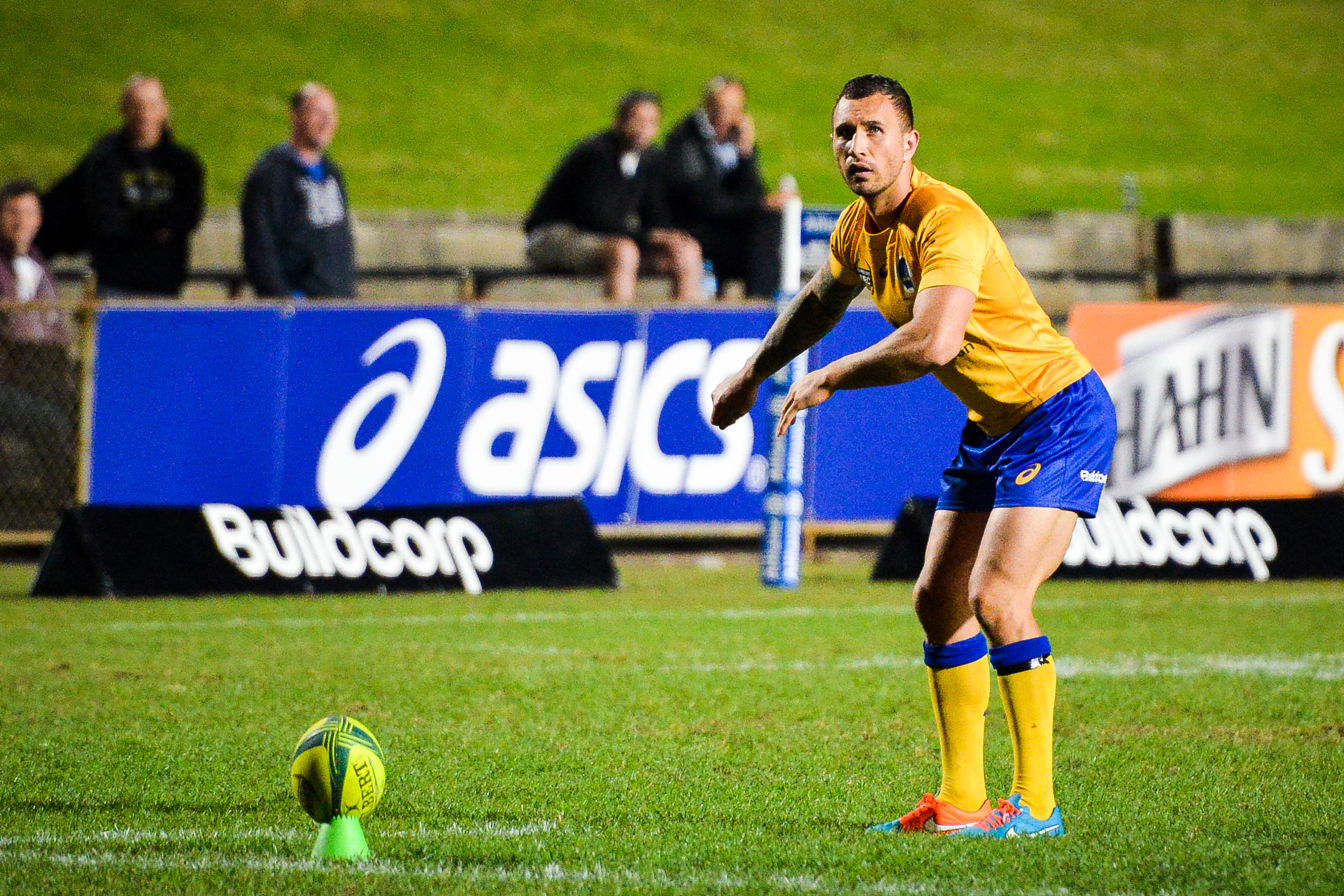
Quade Cooper takes a conversion

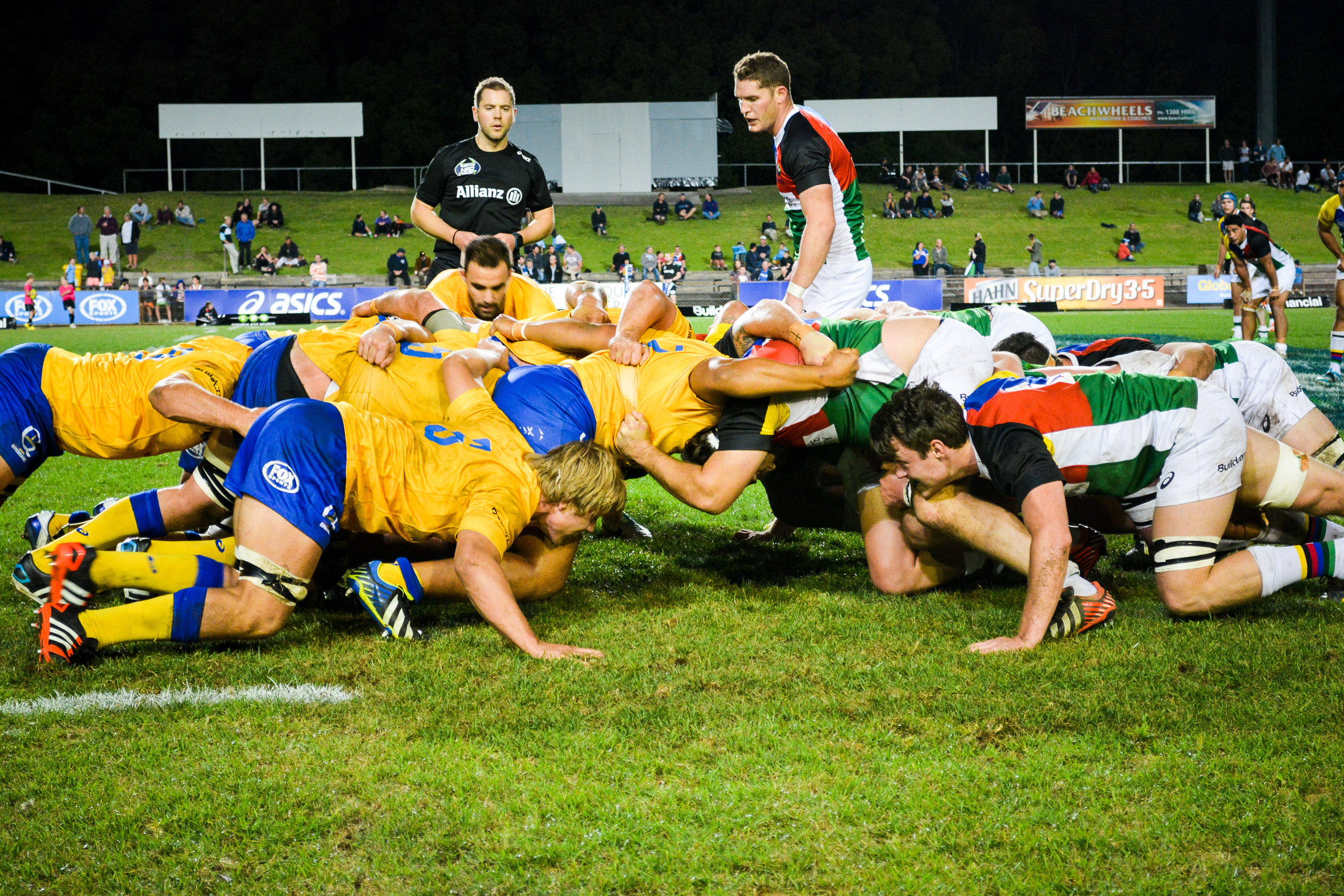
Brisbane City scrum down v North Harbour Rays

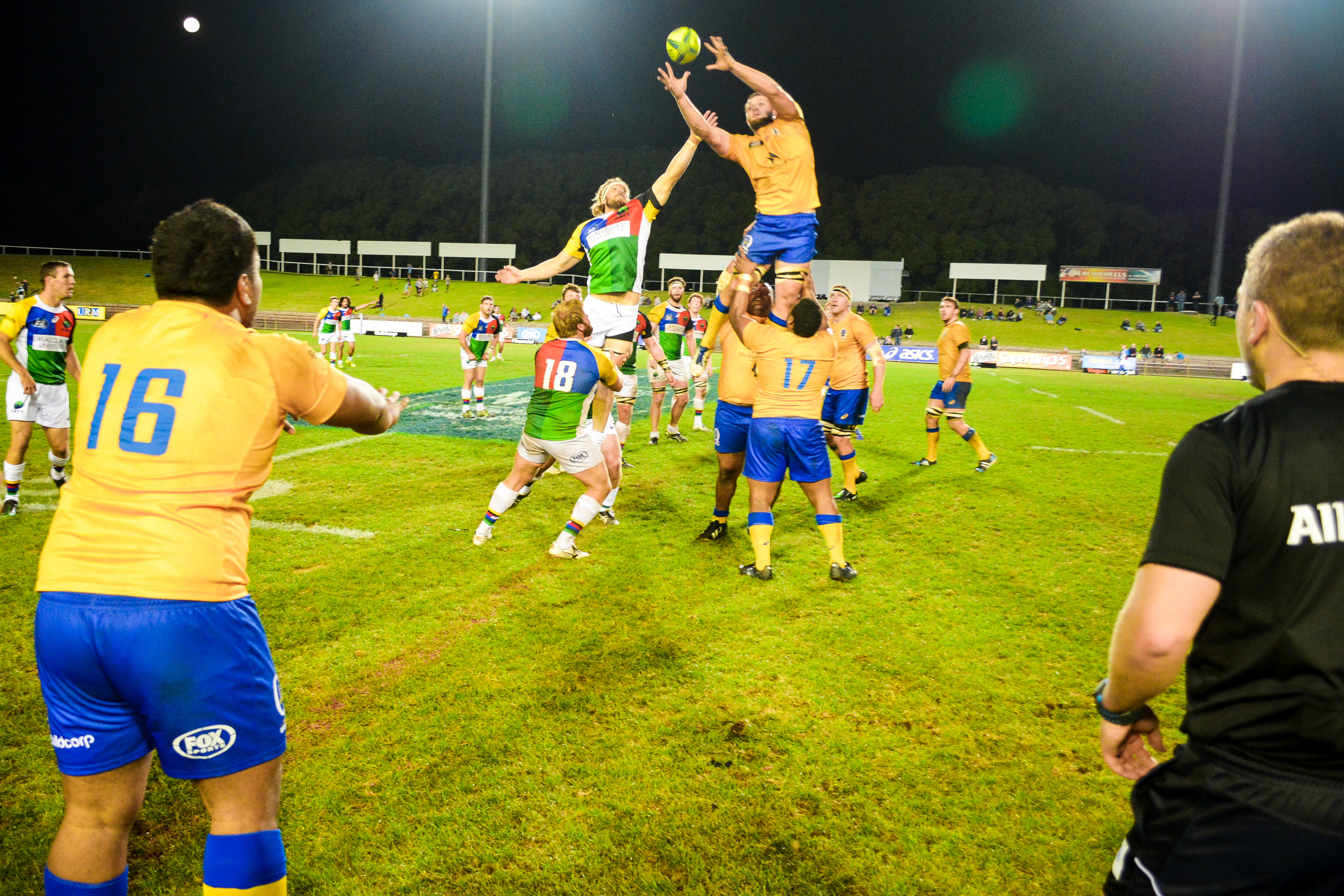
Brisbane City win a lineout v North Harbour Rays

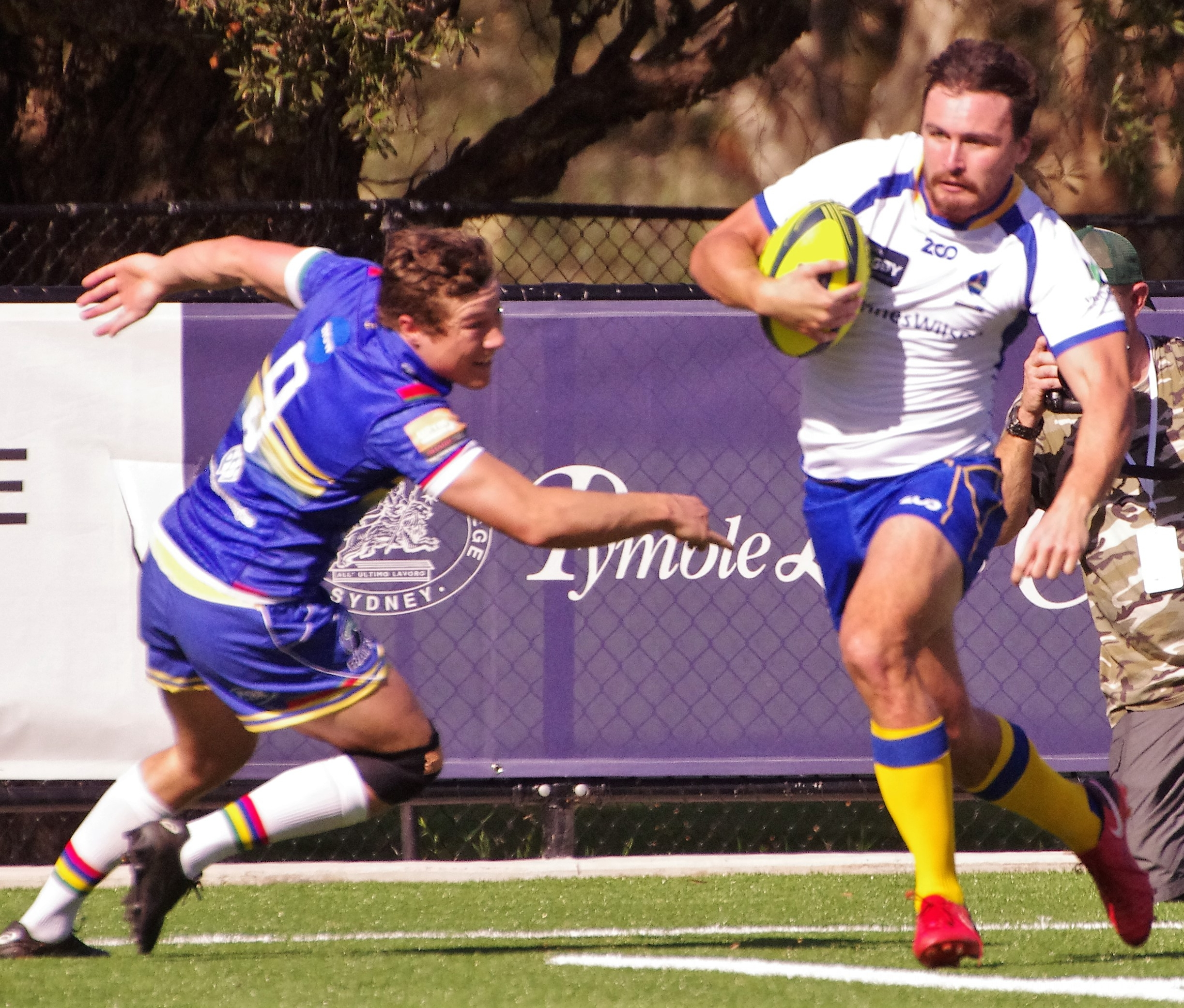
Lachlan Maranta (in white) in 2018

== See also ==
- Queensland Reds
- Queensland Premier Rugby
- Rugby union in Queensland

== Sources ==
- Purcell, Andy (2002). "120 Years of Country Rugby 1882–2002" (PDF). Queensland Rugby. Archived from the original (PDF) on 20 May 2014.
- "Annual Report 2013" (PDF). Queensland Rugby. 2013. Archived from the original (PDF) on 8 July 2014.
