= List of alumni of Brisbane State High School =

This is a list of notable alumni of Brisbane State High School.

== Business ==
- Anna Podolsky – Class of 2008 – CEO and founder of Lyka
- Michael Bryce AM AE FRSA – Class of 1955 – principal design advisor to the Sydney Olympic Games; husband of Quentin Bryce
- Robin Gibson AO – Class of 1947 – architect noted for designing QPAC, the Queensland Art Gallery, the State Library, the Queensland Museum and Queen Street Mall
- John Lazarou – Class of 1979 – co-founder of The Coffee Club
- Andrew Liveris AO – Class of 1971 – CEO of Dow Chemicals; co-chair of President Obama's Advanced Manufacturing Partnership; selected by President Trump to head the American Manufacturing Council
- Paul Morgan – Class of 1964 – co-founder of the Brisbane Broncos
- Katie Page – Class of 1973 – CEO of Harvey Norman; co-owner of the Magic Millions; first woman elected to the board of the National Rugby League
- Ed Tweddell – CEO, F. H. Faulding & Co.
- Chris Wallin – Class of 1969 – businessman
- Graeme Wood AM – Class of 1964 – co-founder and executive director of wotif.com; 2008 Queenslander of the Year

== Education ==
- Paul Memmott AO – Class of 1966 – architect, anthropologist and academic

== Entertainment, media and the arts ==
- Jess Bush – Class of 2009 – actress
- Jessica Anderson – novelist
- Ray Barrett – actor
- Gordon Bennett – artist
- Paul Bishop – Class of 1984 – actor and Councillor for Redland City
- Barbara Blackman AO – Class of 1945 – writer
- John Blight – Class of 1931 – poet
- Carol Burns – Class of 1964 – actor, founding member of the Queensland Theatre Company
- Joff Bush – Class of 2002 – composer
- Edward Chen – Class of 2010 – violinist and YouTuber
- Laurence Collinson – playwright, actor, poet, journalist, and secondary school teacher
- Barry Creyton – Class of 1955 – actor and playwright
- Brett Dean – Class of 1978 – composer
- Paul Dean – Class of 1983 – clarinetist
- Diana Doherty – Class of 1983 – oboist with the Sydney Symphony Orchestra
- Penny Downie – Class of 1970 – actress
- Jackie French AM – Class of 1970 – author; Senior Australian of the Year 2015
- Luke Haralampou – Class of 2000 – slam poet
- Marjorie Hesse MBE– pianist and composer
- Neil Johnson – Class of 1984 – film and music video producer, editor and director
- Steve Kipner – 1962–1963 – songwriter and record producer
- Becky Lucas – Class of 2005 – comedian, writer and presenter
- Fintan Magee – Class of 2000 – street artist
- Tahu Matheson – Class of 1993 – classical pianist and conductor
- Matt Okine – Class of 2002 – comedian, actor and radio host
- Charles Osborne – Class of 1943 – journalist, theatre and opera critic, poet and novelist
- John Peart – Class of 1962 – artist
- Barrett Reid AM – Class of 1943 – librarian, poet and literary editor
- William Robinson AO – Class of 1951 – artist, twice winner of the Archibald Prize
- Lillian Roxon – Class of 1948 – author and journalist
- Donald Shanks AO OBE – Class of 1956 – bass-baritone singer
- Christopher Sommers – Class of 1994 – actor
- Patrick Thomas AM MBE – Class of 1949 – conductor
- Avra Velis – singer-songwriter
- Liam Young – Class of 1996 – film director and architect

== Governance and politics ==
- Len Ardill – Sub Junior Class of 1948 – Labor MLA for Salisbury and Archerfield
- Ted Baldwin – MLA for Redlands and Logan
- Chris Bombolas – Class of 1978 – Labor MLA for Chatsworth; former Channel 9 sports presenter and reporter
- Fred Campbell – attended 1924 – Liberal MLA for Aspley (1960–1980)
- Max Chandler-Mather – Class of 2009 – Greens MP for Griffith
- Mal Colston – Class of 1955 – Labor senator representing Queensland (1975–1999)
- Manfred Cross AM – Class of 1946 – federal member for Brisbane in the House of Representatives (1961–1975, 1980–1990)
- John Dempsey – Class of 1984 – former Queensland Minister for Police and Community Safety
- George Georges – Class of 1939 – Labor senator
- Bill Hayden AC – Class of 1949 – 21st Governor-General of Australia; Foreign Affairs Minister (1983–1988)
- Sir Leo Hielscher AC – Class of 1941 – past Head of Queensland Treasury, Head of QIC and QIDC
- Alasdair Hutton OBE TD OStJ – Junior Class of 1957 – member of European Parliament, author, narrator
- Myer Kangan AO OBE – Junior Class of 1934 – public servant and educationalist
- John-Paul Langbroek – Sub-Senior Class of 1978 – Liberal MLA for Surfers Paradise; Minister for Education, Training and Employment (2012–2015); Minister of Education and Minister of Arts (2024-present)
- Amy MacMahon – Class of 2003 – Greens MLA for South Brisbane (2020-2024)
- Julie-Ann Campbell – Class of 2003 – Labor MP for Moreton
- Charis Mullen – Class of 1991 – Labor MLA for Jordan
- Bill O'Chee – Class of 1982 – National Party Senator; Australian representative at skelton World Cups
- Lin Powell – Class of 1954 – National MLA for Isis
- Guelfi Scassola – Class of 1958 – Liberal MLA for Mt Gravatt
- Lyle Schuntner – Class of 1954 – Liberal MLA for Mount Coot-tha
- Murray Watt – Class of 1989 – Labor MLA for Everton, Labor Senator for Queensland, Minister for Emergency Management; Agriculture, Fisheries and Forestry; Employment and Workplace Relations; and Environment and Water
- Lawrie Willett AO – Director-General of Health (1983–1984); Chancellor of Charles Sturt University (2002–2014)
- Jason Woodforth – Class of 1984 – Liberal National MLA for Nudgee (2012-2015)

== Journalism ==
- Matt Carmichael – Class of 1998 – sports journalist
- Jenny Coopes – Junior Class of 1960 – political cartoonist, illustrator and painter
- Nick Etchells – Class of 1991 – journalist
- Heather Foord – Class of 1982 – journalist
- Archer Hamilton – Class of 2008 – satirical journalist, co-founder of The Betoota Advocate
- Edgar George Holt – poet, journalist and public relations officer
- Sylvia Jeffreys – Class of 2003 – journalist and Nine Network presenter
- Sandra Sully – Class of 1978 – journalist and Network 10 presenter
- Matt Wordsworth – Class of 1991 – journalist and television presenter
- Neil Breen – Class of 1985 – newspaper journalist editor; Nine Network producer and presenter; Walkley Award winner

== Law ==
- Peter Applegarth AM – Class of 1975 – Justice of the Supreme Court of Queensland
- Glenn Martin AM – Class of 1972 – Justice of the Supreme Court of Queensland; President, Industrial Court of Queensland

== Medicine and science ==
- Paul Glasziou AO – Class of 1971 – academic physician
- Martin Green AM FRS FAA – Class of 1965 – solar scientist; founding Director of the University of New South Wales' Australian Centre for Advanced Photovoltaics
- James Morton AM – Class of 1980 – haematologist, advocate for Autistic children
- Geoffrey Pryde – Class of 1991 – quantum physicist, deputy director of Centre for Quantum Dynamics
- Lawrie Powell AC – Class of 1952 – medical researcher specializing in gastroenterology and hepatology
- Gary Roubin – Class of 1965 – cardiologist known for his work in the first FDA-approved coronary stent
- Sir Sydney Sunderland CMG – Class of 1929 – medical scientist who studied nerves and nerve injuries; founding member of the Australian Academy of Science
- Lesley Williams AM – scientist specialising in human cytogenetics

== Military ==
- Virgil Brennan DFC DFM – Junior Class of 1934 – flying ace of the Second World War
- Ray Funnell AC – Class of 1952 – Chief of the Air Staff; RAAF (1987–1992)
- Geoff Shepherd AO – Class of 1969 – Air Marshall; Chief of the RAAF (2005–2008)
- Douglas Vincent CB AM OBE – Class of 1934 – Major General in the Australian Army

== Religion ==
- Eva Burrows AC – Class of 1946 – 13th General of The Salvation Army
- Ken Ham – senior science teacher, young Earth creationist and founder of the Creation Museum in the US
- John Mavor AM – Class of 1951 – minister of religion; former president of Uniting Church in Australia
- David Tribe – Class of 1949 – secularist and humanist

== Sport ==
Many students of the school have gone on to represent Australia at the Olympics and win medals. More than thirty past students have competed in the Olympics during the school's history, winning numerous bronze, silver and gold medals, some with world records, across a range of sporting disciplines.

Athletics

- Naa Anang – Class of 2013 – long jumper for Australia, Commonwealth Games (2018)
- Nik Bojic – Class of 2009 – high jumper for Australia, Commonwealth Games (2014)
- Norma Croker – Class of 1952 – Olympian sprinter (gold 1956; 1960); first Queensland woman to win gold
- Cedric Dubler – Class of 2012 – Olympic decathlete (2016, 2020; 2x bronze medalist at Commonwealth (2018, 2022)
- Marion Hoffman – Class of 1967 – Olympic sprinter (1972); gold and bronze at the Commonwealth Games (1970)
- Jenny Lund – long-distance runner for Australia
- Lara Roberts – Class of 2021 – hammer thrower for Australia, Commonwealth Games (2026)

Australian rules football

- Jaspa Fletcher – Class of 2022 – Brisbane Lions

Badminton

- Wendy Chen – Class of 2010 – Olympian (2016, 2020)

Basketball

- Chris Goulding – Class of 2005 – Olympian (2016; bronze 2020); professional basketball player in Australia and Spain
- Shyla Heal – Class of 2016 – Australian professional basketball player
- Mojave King – professional basketball player
- Tiana Mangakahia – Class of 2012 – professional basketball player
- Brock Motum – Class of 2007 – Olympian (2016)

Cricket

- Peter Allan – Class of 1953 – Australian cricketer
- John Childe-Freeman – Class of 1951 – Queensland cricketer
- Ian Healy AO – Class of 1981 – Australian test cricketer, Australian wicket-keeper of the century
- Mel Johnson – Class of 1959 – Australian test cricket match umpire
- Michael Kasprowicz – Class of 1989 – Australian test cricketer
- Charli Knott – Class of 2020 – Queensland Fire, Brisbane Heat
- Marnus Labuschagne – Class of 2011 – Australian test cricketer
- Stuart Law – Year 9 1982 – Australian test cricketer and coach
- John Maclean MBE – Class of 1963 – Australian test cricketer
- Sandy Morgan – Class of 1962 – Queensland cricketer
- James Peirson – Class of 2009 – Queensland cricketer
- Ian Seib – Class of 1963 – Queensland cricketer
- Glenn Trimble – Class of 1979 – Australian ODI cricketer
- Georgia Voll – Class of 2021 – Australian cricketer
- Jack Wildermuth – Class of 2010 – Brisbane Heat, Queensland and Australian T20 cricketer

Cycling

- Stuart Jones – Class of 1986 – Paralympian (2020)

Goalball

- Nicole Esdaile – Class of 2004 – Paralympian (2016)

Gymnastics

- Elizabeth Lee – Class of 2023 – Australian rhythmic gymnast
- Millie Hintz – 2020-2023 – Australian rhythmic gymnast
- Lidiia Iakovleva – Olympic rhythmic gymnast (2024)
- Reina Santana – Class of 2023 – Australian rhythmic gymnast
- Mia Strachan – Class of 2024 – Australian rhythmic gymnast
- Jessica Weintraub – Class of 2025 – Olympic rhythmic gymnast (2024)

Hockey

- Fred Quine – Class of 1956 – Olympic silver medallist (1968)
- Karissa van der Wath – Class of 2024 – Hockeyroos (2025)

Kayaking and canoeing

- Graham Gilles – Class of 1964 – Olympic sprint canoeist (1976)
- Lyndsie Fogarty – Class of 2001 – Olympic sprint canoeist bronze medallist (2008; 2012)

Motorsport

- Gregg Hansford – Class of 1969 – professional motorcycle and automobile racer; ten-time Grand Prix winner

Netball

- Peta Stephens – Class of 1995 – Queensland Firebirds captain

Rowing

- Tim Conrad – Class of 1969 – Olympian (1976)
- Ian Edmunds – Class of 1978 – Olympic bronze medallist (1984)
- Bo Hanson – Class of 1990 – Olympian (1992; bronze 1996; bronze 2000; 2004)

Rugby league

- Jay Aston – Class of 2006 – Papua New Guinea Rugby League World Cup (2008)
- Greg Holben – Class of 1968 – Maroon
- Wally Lewis AM – Class of 1977 – Australian national team captain (1984-1989); coach; sportscaster
- Andrew McCullough – Class of 2007 – Brisbane Broncos
- Ryan McGoldrick – Class of 1999 – Cronulla, Castleford Tigers, USA national team
- Paul Morgan – Class of 1964 – Queensland; co-founder of Brisbane Broncos
- John Plath – Class of 1986 – Brisbane Broncos
- Murray Taulagi – Class of 2016 – North Queensland Cowboys

Rugby union

- Moses Alo-Emile – French national team, Stade Français, Schoolboy
- Paul Alo-Emile – Class of 2009 – professional rugby union player; Samoan national team, Australian U20, Schoolboy
- Connor Anderson – Class of 2913 – Reds
- Tom Barker – co-founder of Brisbane Broncos
- Mark Bartholomeusz – Class of 1994 – Wallaby, Schoolboy, ACT Brumbies
- Eddie Bonis – Wallaby
- Curtis Browning – Class of 2011 – Schoolboy, Queensland Reds
- Paul Carozza – Class of 1983 – Wallaby, Queensland Reds
- Jaiden Christian – Canterbury
- Joel Faulkner – Class of 2009 – Australian U20s, Queensland Reds
- David Feao – Tonga national team
- Chris Feauai-Sautia – Class of 2011 – Wallaby, Schoolboy, Queensland Reds, highest capped Australian Schoolboy
- Charlie Fetoai – Class of 2005 – Queensland Reds
- Peter Hynes – Class of 2000 – Wallaby, Queensland Reds
- Paul Kahl – Wallaby
- Simon Kasprowicz – Class of 1994 – Waratah, co-owner of Okanui
- Mafileo Kefu – Class of 2000 – Tongan national team, Toulon
- Steve Kefu – Wallaby, Queensland Reds
- Samu Kerevi – Class of 2011 – Wallaby, Queensland Reds
- Adam Korczyk – Class of 2012 – Queensland Reds
- Barry Lea – Wallaby, Queensland Reds
- Wally Lewis – Wallaby
- Peter McLean – Class of 1969 – Wallaby
- William McLean – Class of 1933 – Wallaby Captain
- Ben Meehan – Class of 2011 – Melbourne Rebels, London Irish
- Paul Mooney – Class of 1946 – Wallaby
- James Moore – Class of 2010 – Japan national team, Sunwolves
- Andy Muirhead – ACT Brumbies
- David Paice – Class of 2000 – England national team, England Saxons, London Irish
- Jordan Petaia – Class of 2017 – Wallaby, Queensland Reds, youngest player to debut for the Qld Reds, youngest player to debut for the Wallabies in a World Cup
- Ed Quirk – Class of 2008 – Queensland Reds, Sunwolves
- Christopher Roche – Class of 1977 – Wallaby, Queensland Reds
- Jacob Rauluni – Class of 1990 – Fiji national Captain, Queensland Reds
- Mosese Rauluni – Class of 1992 – Fiji national Captain
- Rohan Saifoloi – Schoolboy
- Chappie Schulte – Wallaby
- Rodney Seib – Class of 1992 – rugby union coach
- Peter Slattery – Class of 1983 – Wallaby, Queensland Reds
- Brian Smith – Class of 1983 – Wallaby, Ireland national team, Queensland Reds, England attack coach
- Patrick Tafa – Class of 2016 – Waratah
- Matt To'omua – Class of 2007 – Wallaby, ACT Brumbies
- Tuaina Taii Tualima – Class of 2015 – Queensland Reds, Melbourne Rebels, ACT Brumbies
- Will Tupou – Class of 2007 – Japan national team, Sunwolves
- Brando Va'aulu – Class of 2005 – Samoa national team, Queensland Reds
- David Wilson – Class of 1984 – Wallaby

Rugby union 7's

- Charlotte Caslick OAM – Class of 2012 – Olympian (gold 2016)
- Isabella Nasser – Class of 2019 – Olympian (2024), Australia rugby sevens player

Sailing

- Peter Conde – Class of 1975 – sailor, Australian sport administrator

Soccer

- Ben Halloran – Class of 2009 – Socceroos, Gold Coast United FC, Brisbane Roar, Fortuna Düsseldorf
- Chris Harold – Class of 2009 – Gold Coast United FC, Perth Glory
- Grace Kuilamu – Class of 2024 – Matildas, Brisbane Roar
- Golgol Mebrahtu – Class of 2007 – Gold Coast United FC, Melbourne Heart

Softball

- Marissa Carpadios – Class of 1995 – Olympic silver medallist (2004)
- Danielle Stewart – Class of 1998 – Olympian bronze medallist (2008)

Speed skating

- Deanna Lockett – Year 10 (2011) – Olympic speed skater (2014, 2018)

Swimming

- Evelina Afoa – Class of 2015 – Olympian for Samoa (2016)
- Duncan Armstrong – Class of 1985 – Olympian (gold and silver 1988; 1992)
- Susie Baumer – Class of 1983 – Olympian (1984, 1988)
- Jodie Clatworthy – Class of 1989 – Olympian (1988)
- Brad Cooper – Class of 1972 – Olympian gold medallist (1972)
- Jason Cooper – Commonwealth Games gold medallist (1990)
- Sue Funch – Class of 1971 – Olympian (1972)
- Rosemary Fydler – Class of 1979 – Olympian (1980), Commonwealth Games (1978)
- Justin Lemberg – Class of 1983 – Olympian bronze medallist (1984)
- Hayley Lewis – Class of 1991 – Olympian (silver and bronze 1992; 1996)
- Shane Lewis – Class of 1990 – Olympian (1996)
- Scott Logan – Class of 1993 – Olympian (1996)
- Lise Mackie – Class of 1993 – Olympian (1992; bronze 1996)
- Dwade Sheehan – Class of 1991 – Commonwealth Games gold medallist (relay; 1994)
- Jon Sieben – Class of 1983 – Olympian (gold and bronze 1984; 1988; 1992)
- Allison Smith – Class of 1976 – Olympian (1976)
- Kai Taylor – Olympian silver medallist (2024), Commonwealth Games gold medallist (relay; 2026)
- Laticia Transom – Class of 2018 – Olympic swimmer for New Zealand (2024)
- Karen Van de Graaf – Class of 1979 – Olympian (1980)

Tennis

- Mark Draper – Class of 1987 – professional tennis player
- Scott Draper – Class of 1991 – Australian Open mixed doubles champion (2005)

Triathlon

- Rina Hill – Year 9 1982-83 – Olympian (2004)

Volleyball

- Zane Christensen – Class of 2002 – Olympian (2004)

Water polo

- Kate Gynther – Class of 1999 – Olympian (2004; bronze 2008; bronze 2012)
- Amy Hetzel – Class of 2000 – Olympian bronze medallist (2008)
