= List of Melbourne Rebels players =

This article contains a list of rugby union players who have represented the Melbourne Rebels in a Super Rugby competition match since they joined the competition in 2011 and exited the competition at the end of the 2024 season. Players are ordered in order of first appearance. Players who played in the Rebels inaugural game are ordered in alphabetical order, but whereafter are ordered in position from No. 1 to No. 15 if more than one player debut in the same match at the same point of debut. Players are given an official 'Rebel number' on their first Super Rugby appearance, or appearance in a regionalised competition such as Super Rugby AU or Super Rugby Trans-Tasman.

A player's nationality shown is taken from the nationality at the highest honour for the national side obtained; or if never capped internationally their place of birth. Senior caps take precedence over junior caps or place of birth; junior caps take precedence over place of birth. A player's nationality at debut may be different from the nationality shown. Combination sides like the British and Irish Lions or Pacific Islanders are not national sides, or nationalities.

Players listed in Bold denote a player who is internationally capped. Players may have played in another position than listed, but only main positions are listed. Players may have been contracted for others seasons, but only seasons in which they played an official Super Rugby match are included.

== Rebels players ==
- Statistics correct as of end of 2024 Super Rugby Pacific season

No.	Nat.	Name	Position(s)	Debut season	Last season	Games played	Minutes played	Tries	Points	Caps
1	(Russia)	**Adam Byrnes**	Lock	2011	2012	11	426	0	0	6 caps for Russia
2	(Australia)	**Sam Cordingley**	Scrum-half	2011	2011	2	79	0	0	22 caps for Australia
3	(Wales)	**Gareth Delve**	Loose forward	2011	2013	44	2936	4	20	11 caps for Wales
4	(Australia)	**Nic Henderson**	Prop	2011	2013	41	2929	0	0	3 caps for Australia
5	(Australia)	James Hilgendorf	Fly-half; Centre	2011	2013	17	739	2	10	
6	(Australia)	**Julian Huxley**	Fullback	2011	2012	22	1407	1	67	9 caps for Australia
7	(England)	**Michael Lipman**	Loose forward	2011	2012	22	1280	2	10	10 caps for England
8	(New Zealand)	Hoani MacDonald	Lock; Loose forward	2011	2011	6	278	0	0	
9	(Australia)	Lachlan Mitchell	Centre	2011	2014	48	3006	7	35	
10	(Australia)	**Stirling Mortlock**	Centre	2011	2012	23	1484	3	17	80 caps for Australia
11	(New Zealand)	**Kevin O'Neill**	Lock	2011	2011	7	349	0	0	1 cap for New Zealand
12	(New Zealand)	Ged Robinson	Hooker	2011	2013	46	3074	7	35	
13	(Australia)	Luke Rooney	Wing; Fullback	2011	2011	10	473	0	0	
14	(New Zealand)	**Greg Somerville**	Prop	2011	2011	16	1186	1	5	66 caps for New Zealand
15	(Tonga)	**Cooper Vuna**	Wing; Fullback	2011	2013	36	2486	13	65	2 caps for Australia; 16 caps for Tonga (Note: Vuna originally represented Australia internationally in 2012, before using the Olympic loophole ahead of the 2016 Summer Olympics to switch his international allegiance to Tonga, who he has represented since 2016.)
16	(England)	**Danny Cipriani**	Fly-half	2011	2012	19	1298	2	122	16 caps for England
17	(Australia)	Heath Tessmann	Hooker	2011	2011	8	119	0	0	
18	(Australia)	Jarrod Saffy	Loose forward	2011	2013	35	2042	2	10	
19	(Australia)	**Laurie Weeks**	Prop	2011	2017	85	4200	0	0	2 caps for Australia
20	(Australia)	**Alister Campbell**	Lock	2011	2012	30	1392	2	10	4 caps for Australia
21	(Australia)	**Nick Phipps**	Scrum-half	2011	2013	47	3266	6	30	72 caps for Australia
22	(Tonga)	**Afusipa Taumoepeau**	Centre; Wing	2011	2011	11	381	2	10	17 caps for Tonga
23	(Australia)	**Mark Gerrard**	Wing; Fullback	2011	2012	27	1914	2	13	24 caps for Australia
24	(New Zealand)	Tom Chamberlain	Loose forward	2011	2012	11	589	0	0	
25	(Australia)	Hugh Pyle	Lock	2011	2014	57	3721	9	45	
26	(Australia)	Richard Kingi	Scrum-half; Wing	2011	2013	30	1688	3	23	
27	(Australia)	Tim Davidson	Loose forward	2011	2013	26	912	1	5	
28	(Australia)	**Peter Betham**	Centre; Wing	2011	2011	7	206	1	5	2 caps for Australia
29	(Australia)	**Rodney Blake**	Prop	2011	2012	20	870	3	15	7 caps for Australia
30	(Australia)	Luke Holmes	Hooker	2011	2012	5	94	0	0	
31	(South Africa)	JP du Plessis	Centre	2011	2011	1	2	0	0	
32	(Australia)	**Luke Jones**	Lock; Loose forward	2011	2020	88	6224	1	5	6 caps for Australia
33	(Australia)	**Adam Freier**	Hooker	2011	2012	16	445	3	15	25 caps for Australia
34	(Australia)	**James O'Connor**	Fly-half; Centre; Fullback	2012	2013	21	1478	3	201	70 caps for Australia
35	(Australia)	Mitch Inman	Centre	2012	2017	81	6343	6	30	
36	(Australia)	**Lloyd Johansson**	Centre	2012	2012	7	309	1	5	3 caps for Australia
37	(Australia)	**Kurtley Beale**	Centre; Fullback	2012	2013	14	1005	4	66	95 caps for Australia
38	(Australia)	Nic Stirzaker	Scrum-half	2012	2017	59	2913	6	30	
39	(Tonga)	**Eddie Aholelei**	Prop	2012	2012	1	11	0	0	9 caps for Tonga
40	(New Zealand)	Jono Owen	Prop	2012	2012	9	442	0	0	
41	(Australia)	Ryan Hodson	Loose forward	2012	2012	2	22	0	0	
42	(Australia)	**Cadeyrn Neville**	Lock	2012	2015	47	2314	3	15	8 caps for Australia
43	(Australia)	Hugh Perrett	Loose forward	2012	2012	5	347	0	0	
44	(Samoa)	**Paul Alo-Emile**	Prop	2012	2015	48	1845	1	5	26 caps for Samoa
45	(New Zealand)	Scott Fuglistaller	Loose forward	2013	2016	50	2465	3	15	
46	(Australia)	**Scott Higginbotham**	Loose forward	2013	2015	45	3489	15	75	34 caps for Australia
47	(Australia)	Rory Sidey	Centre; Wing	2013	2013	15	1015	1	5	
48	(Fiji)	**Alex Rokobaro**	Wing	2013	2014	3	167	0	0	3 caps for Fiji
49	(Japan)	**Shota Horie**	Hooker	2013	2014	18	637	1	5	77 caps for Japan
50	(Australia)	Tom English	Centre; Wing	2013	2020	97	6840	22	110	
51	(Australia)	Jordy Reid	Loose forward	2013	2017	41	1974	2	10	
52	(Australia)	Angus Roberts	Fly-half; Fullback	2013	2014	14	654	2	16	
53	(New Zealand)	Jason Woodward	Fullback	2013	2014	26	1939	6	210	
54	(Australia)	Bryce Hegarty	Fly-half; Fullback	2013	2015	32	1739	7	49	
55	(Australia)	Kimami Sitauti	Wing	2013	2013	4	62	0	0	
56	(Australia)	**Luke Burgess**	Scrum-half	2013	2015	35	1698	8	40	37 caps for Australia
57	(Samoa)	**Pat Leafa**	Hooker	2013	2017	51	2313	1	5	1 cap for Samoa
58	(United States)	**James King**	Lock	2013	2013	1	10	0	0	2 caps for United States
59	(Australia)	Cruze Ah-Nau	Prop	2014	2017	43	1088	0	0	
60	(Australia)	**Toby Smith**	Prop	2014	2017	50	3264	3	15	6 caps for Australia
61	(Australia)	**Sean McMahon**	Loose forward	2014	2017	40	2840	4	20	27 caps for Australia
62	(New Zealand)	**Tamati Ellison**	Centre	2014	2016	36	2705	2	10	4 caps for New Zealand
63	(Australia)	Tom Kingston	Wing	2014	2014	12	474	1	5	
64	(England)	Max Lahiff	Prop	2014	2014	8	254	0	0	
65	(Australia)	Colby Fainga'a	Loose forward	2014	2018	66	3745	4	20	
66	(Samoa)	**Steve Fualau**	Hooker	2014	2014	1	6	0	0	2 caps for Samoa
67	(Australia)	Ben Meehan	Scrum-half	2014	2017	33	1215	4	22	
68	(Tonga)	**Telusa Veainu**	Wing	2014	2015	7	285	3	15	17 caps for Tonga
69	(Tonga)	**Lopeti Timani**	Lock; Loose forward	2014	2018	52	2853	6	30	12 caps for Australia; 5 caps for Tonga (Note: Timani originally represented Australia internationally between 2016 and 2017, before using the Olympic loophole ahead of the 2020 Summer Olympics to switch his international allegiance to Tonga, who he has represented since 2021.)
70	(Japan)	**Male Sa'u**	Centre	2014	2014	8	523	0	0	27 caps for Japan
71	(Australia)	Jack Debreczeni	Fly-half	2014	2018	54	3807	7	246	
72	(Australia)	**Lalakai Foketi**	Centre	2014	2014	2	13	0	0	9 caps for Australia
73	(Australia)	Josh Holmes	Scrum-half	2014	2014	1	25	0	0	
74	(Australia)	Sam Jeffries	Lock	2014	2019	21	378	0	0	
75	(Australia)	**Dom Shipperley**	Wing	2015	2016	19	1438	5	25	3 caps for Australia
76	(Australia)	**Mike Harris**	Fly-half; Centre	2015	2016	22	1489	2	133	10 caps for Australia
77	(Australia)	**Sefa Naivalu**	Wing	2015	2018	46	2717	16	80	10 caps for Australia
78	(Australia)	Ben Whittaker	Hooker	2015	2015	1	9	0	0	
79	(Australia)	Steve Cummins	Lock	2015	2021	29	1460	1	5	
80	(Australia)	Jonah Placid	Wing; Fullback	2015	2017	18	987	7	35	
81	(Ireland)	Tom Sexton	Hooker	2015	2015	5	99	0	0	
82	(Australia)	**Radike Samo**	Loose forward	2015	2015	1	10	0	0	23 caps for Australia
83	(Australia)	Tim Metcher	Prop	2015	2016	6	128	0	0	
84	(Australia)	Cam Crawford	Wing	2015	2016	9	630	2	10	
85	(Japan)	**Keita Inagaki**	Prop	2015	2015	1	23	0	0	53 caps for Japan
86	(Australia)	**James Hanson**	Hooker	2016	2022	59	3084	5	25	12 caps for Australia
87	(New Zealand)	**Adam Thomson**	Loose forward	2016	2016	13	950	1	5	29 caps for New Zealand
88	(Australia)	**Reece Hodge**	Fly-half; Centre; Wing; Fullback	2016	2023	100	8339	37	573	64 caps for Australia
89	(New Zealand)	Dan Hawkins	Fly-half	2016	2016	3	37	0	2	
90	(Ireland)	**Jamie Hagan**	Prop	2016	2016	11	332	0	0	1 cap for Ireland
91	(Japan)	**Kotaro Matsushima**	Wing	2016	2016	5	106	0	0	55 caps for Japan
92	(Australia)	Mick Snowden	Scrum-half	2016	2017	5	63	0	0	
93	(Australia)	Tom Moloney	Prop	2016	2017	7	59	0	0	
94	(Scotland)	**Sione Tuipulotu**	Centre; Wing	2016	2019	11	277	0	0	40 caps for Scotland; 1 cap for British & Irish Lions
95	(New Zealand)	Culum Retallick	Lock	2016	2017	19	867	1	5	
96	(Australia)	Siliva Siliva	Hooker	2016	2017	10	272	0	0	
97	(Australia)	Paul Asquith	Centre; Wing	2016	2016	3	143	0	0	
98	(Australia)	**Rob Leota**	Lock; Loose forward	2016	2024	56	2484	2	10	22 caps for Australia
99	(Japan)	**Amanaki Mafi**	Loose forward	2017	2018	30	2306	7	35	28 caps for Japan
100	(New Zealand)	Jackson Garden-Bachop	Fly-half	2017	2017	13	764	1	16	
101	(Australia)	**Jordan Uelese**	Hooker	2017	2024	72	3258	10	50	19 caps for Australia
102	(Australia)	**Marika Koroibete**	Wing	2017	2021	69	5174	23	115	64 caps for Australia
103	(Fiji)	**Ben Volavola**	Fly-half	2017	2017	10	570	0	10	52 caps for Fiji
104	(New Zealand)	**Tyrel Lomax**	Prop	2017	2017	13	513	0	0	55 caps for New Zealand
105	(Australia)	**Jake Schatz**	Loose forward	2017	2017	6	208	0	0	2 caps for Australia
106	(Australia)	**Jack Maddocks**	Wing; Fullback	2017	2019	34	2324	19	95	7 caps for Australia
107	(Australia)	Fereti Sa'aga	Prop	2017	2020	25	996	1	5	
108	(Scotland)	Murray Douglas	Lock	2017	2017	3	106	0	0	
109	(Wales)	**Dominic Day**	Lock	2017	2017	5	297	0	0	3 caps for Wales
110	(Australia)	Will Miller	Loose forward	2017	2017	5	268	1	5	
111	(Australia)	Hugh Sinclair	Loose forward	2017	2017	7	298	0	0	
112	(Japan)	**Esei Ha'angana**	Lock	2017	2020	11	173	0	0	5 caps for Japan
113	(Australia)	Harrison Goddard	Scrum-half	2017	2019	7	41	0	0	
114	(Australia)	Semisi Tupou	Centre; Wing	2017	2019	9	239	1	5	
115	(Australia)	**Tetera Faulkner**	Prop	2018	2019	29	1539	1	5	4 caps for Australia
116	(New Zealand)	**Jermaine Ainsley**	Prop	2018	2020	43	1967	0	0	3 caps for Australia (Note: Ainsley originally represented Australia internationally in 2018, before switching his allegiance to New Zealand in 2022 when he represented the Māori All Blacks, although he has yet to feature for New Zealand.)
117	(Australia)	**Matt Philip**	Lock	2018	2023	63	4453	9	45	31 caps for Australia
118	(Tonga)	**Adam Coleman**	Lock	2018	2019	22	1404	0	0	38 caps for Australia; 5 caps for Tonga (Note: Coleman originally represented Australia internationally in between 2016 and 2019, before switching his international allegiance to Tonga, who he has represented since 2023.)
119	(Australia)	Angus Cottrell	Loose forward	2018	2020	34	2108	4	20	
120	(Australia)	**Will Genia**	Scrum-half	2018	2019	23	1582	6	30	110 caps for Australia
121	(Australia)	**Dane Haylett-Petty**	Fullback	2018	2020	33	2326	12	60	38 caps for Australia
122	(Australia)	Ross Haylett-Petty	Lock; Loose forward	2018	2022	43	2007	1	5	
123	(New Zealand)	Michael Ruru	Scrum-half	2018	2019	30	1032	4	20	
124	(Australia)	**Sam Talakai**	Prop	2018	2024	60	2622	2	10	1 cap for Australia
125	(New Zealand)	Anaru Rangi	Hooker	2018	2023	37	2077	7	35	
126	(Australia)	Bill Meakes	Centre	2018	2020	47	3110	11	55	
127	(England)	**Geoff Parling**	Lock	2018	2018	11	467	0	0	29 caps for England; 3 caps for British & Irish Lions
128	(Namibia)	**Richard Hardwick**	Loose forward	2018	2023	67	3524	8	40	2 caps for Australia; 12 caps for Namibia (Note: Hardwick originally represented Australia internationally in 2017, before switching his international allegiance to Namibia, who he has represented since 2022.)
129	(Australia)	**Ben Daley**	Prop	2018	2018	7	116	0	0	3 caps for Australia
130	(Australia)	Mahe Vailanu	Hooker	2018	2018	2	22	0	0	
131	(Samoa)	**Sama Malolo**	Hooker	2018	2018	1	4	0	0	17 caps for Samoa
132	(Australia)	**Nathan Charles**	Hooker	2018	2018	3	33	0	0	4 caps for Australia
133	(Australia)	**Pone Fa'amausili**	Prop	2018	2024	39	1395	2	10	7 caps for Australia
134	(New Zealand)	Tayler Adams	Fly-half	2018	2018	2	15	0	3	
135	(Australia)	**Isi Naisarani**	Loose forward	2019	2021	31	2325	8	40	11 caps for Australia
136	(Australia)	**Quade Cooper**	Fly-half	2019	2019	16	1175	3	116	79 caps for Australia
137	(Australia)	Brad Wilkin	Loose forward	2019	2024	49	2921	9	45	
138	(New Zealand)	Robbie Abel	Hooker	2019	2019	7	201	0	0	
139	(Australia)	**Matt Gibbon**	Prop	2019	2024	75	3078	4	20	6 caps for Australia
140	(Australia)	Campbell Magnay	Centre; Wing	2019	2021	20	975	2	10	
141	(Australia)	Stu Dunbar	Fly-half	2019	2019	1	1	0	0	
142	(Australia)	Hugh Roach	Hooker	2019	2019	8	212	0	0	
143	(Australia)	**Matt To'omua**	Fly-half; Centre	2019	2022	42	2858	2	325	59 caps for Australia
144	(Fiji)	**Frank Lomani**	Scrum-half; Wing	2020	2021	25	1189	3	19	52 caps for Fiji
145	(Australia)	**Andrew Kellaway**	Centre; Wing	2020	2024	50	3629	18	90	49 caps for Australia
146	(Australia)	Michael Wells	Loose forward	2020	2022	39	2713	2	10	
147	(South Africa)	Ruan Smith	Prop	2020	2020	3	133	0	0	
148	(Australia)	Cameron Orr	Prop	2020	2023	38	1613	1	5	
149	(Australia)	Andrew Deegan	Fly-half	2020	2020	9	406	1	14	
150	(New Zealand)	Steven Misa	Hooker	2020	2020	4	106	0	0	
151	(Australia)	Theo Strang	Scrum-half	2020	2020	4	21	0	0	
152	(South Africa)	Ryan Louwrens	Scrum-half	2020	2024	37	2452	8	42	
153	(South Africa)	Gideon Koegelenberg	Lock	2020	2020	5	174	0	0	
154	(South Africa)	Cabous Eloff	Prop	2020	2024	49	1969	6	30	
155	(Japan)	**Michael Stolberg**	Lock	2020	2020	7	203	0	0	10 caps for Japan
156	(Australia)	**Josh Kemeny**	Loose forward	2020	2024	39	2652	5	25	2 caps for Australia
157	(Australia)	Trevor Hosea	Lock	2020	2023	33	1942	1	5	
158	(Tonga)	**Efi Ma'afu**	Hooker	2020	2022	16	333	0	0	3 caps for Tonga
159	(Australia)	Tom Pincus	Wing; Fullback	2020	2021	13	722	1	5	
160	(Australia)	James Tuttle	Scrum-half	2020	2024	45	1142	0	3	
161	(United States)	**Charlie Abel**	Prop	2020	2020	1	19	0	0	3 caps for United States
162	(Australia)	Lachie Anderson	Wing	2020	2024	36	2539	14	70	
163	(Australia)	**Joe Powell**	Scrum-half	2021	2022	27	1487	3	15	4 caps for Australia
164	(Samoa)	**Stacey Ili**	Centre	2021	2023	33	2094	4	20	8 caps for Samoa
165	(Australia)	Ed Craig	Hooker	2021	2021	2	56	0	0	
166	(Australia)	**Isaac Aedo Kailea**	Prop	2021	2024	22	743	1	5	12 caps for Australia
167	(Australia)	Rhys van Nek	Prop	2021	2022	8	116	0	0	
168	(Australia)	Glen Vaihu	Centre; Wing	2021	2024	27	1606	6	30	
169	(Argentina)	**Lucio Sordoni**	Prop	2021	2021	7	152	0	0	7 caps for Argentina
170	(Australia)	Tom Nowlan	Lock	2021	2022	5	85	0	0	
171	(Australia)	Lewis Holland	Centre	2021	2021	3	127	0	0	
172	(Australia)	Jeral Skelton	Centre	2021	2021	2	37	0	0	
173	(Samoa)	Albert Anae	Prop	2021	2021	1	19	0	0	
174	(Australia)	**Carter Gordon**	Fly-half	2021	2024	46	3175	12	156	15 caps for Australia
175	(England)	George Worth	Wing; Fullback	2021	2022	14	710	0	3	
176	(Australia)	Michael Icely	Loose forward	2021	2021	2	24	0	0	
177	(Fiji)	Ilikena Vudogo	Centre; Wing	2021	2022	2	27	0	0	
178	(Samoa)	Young Tonumaipea	Centre; Wing	2021	2022	6	194	3	15	
179	(Australia)	Sam Wallis	Loose forward	2022	2022	8	255	0	0	
180	(New Zealand)	Ray Nu'u	Centre	2022	2022	8	543	2	10	
181	(Australia)	Sef Fa'agase	Prop	2022	2022	2	50	0	0	
182	(Australia)	Tamati Ioane	Loose forward	2022	2023	15	642	0	0	
183	(Australia)	**Josh Canham**	Lock	2022	2024	34	2217	2	10	12 caps for Australia
184	(Australia)	Lukas Ripley	Centre; Wing	2022	2024	16	768	6	30	
185	(New Zealand)	Josh Hill	Lock	2022	2022	7	273	0	0	
186	(Australia)	Nick Jooste	Fly-half; Centre; Fullback	2022	2024	27	1049	3	26	
187	(Fiji)	**Moses Sorovi**	Scrum-half	2022	2022	2	51	0	0	3 caps for Fiji
188	(Australia)	Daniel Maiava	Lock; Loose forward	2022	2024	11	130	0	0	
189	(Australia)	Alex Mafi	Hooker	2023	2024	21	946	4	20	
190	(Australia)	Tuaina Taii Tualima	Lock	2023	2024	23	1147	1	5	
191	(Italy)	**Monty Ioane**	Wing	2023	2023	13	963	2	10	52 caps for Italy
192	(New Zealand)	Vaiolini Ekuasi	Loose forward	2023	2024	27	1343	4	20	
193	(Australia)	Joe Pincus	Wing; Fullback	2023	2023	10	435	1	5	
194	(Fiji)	Angelo Smith	Lock	2023	2024	20	858	4	20	
195	(Samoa)	David Feliuai	Centre; Wing; Fullback	2023	2024	19	1029	2	10	
196	(England)	Tim Cardall	Lock	2023	2023	3	62	0	0	
197	(Australia)	Theo Fourie	Hooker	2023	2023	1	2	0	0	
198	(Australia)	**Lukhan Salakaia-Loto**	Lock; Loose forward	2024	2024	8	640	0	0	51 caps for Australia
199	(England)	**Jack Maunder**	Scrum-half	2024	2024	6	101	0	0	1 cap for England
200	(Australia)	**Filipo Daugunu**	Centre; Wing	2024	2024	12	926	5	25	29 caps for Australia
201	(Australia)	**Taniela Tupou**	Prop	2024	2024	14	541	1	5	78 caps for Australia
202	(Australia)	Jake Strachan	Fly-half; Fullback	2024	2024	9	420	0	13	
203	(New Zealand)	**Matt Proctor**	Centre	2024	2024	5	119	0	0	1 cap for New Zealand
204	(Australia)	Ethan Dobbins	Hooker	2024	2024	5	97	0	0	
205	(Fiji)	Maciu Nabolakasi	Loose forward	2024	2024	10	307	2	10	
206	(Australia)	Mason Gordon	Fly-half; Fullback	2024	2024	3	125	1	5	
207	(Australia)	**Darby Lancaster**	Wing	2024	2024	10	794	4	20	1 cap for Australia
208	(Australia)	Luke Callan	Lock	2024	2024	1	14	0	0	
209	(Australia)	David Vaihu	Centre; Wing	2024	2024	1	37	0	0	

- Notes

== Contracted players who did not play ==
A number of players have been signed by the Melbourne Rebels but not appeared in a match, or are currently signed to the Rebels, but yet to feature in an official Super Rugby match. The following list includes all those players. Players on training contracts or trial contracts are not included here. Players in Bold are internationally capped. Players are listed in alphabetical order.

- (Australia) Wyatt Ballenger
- (Argentina) Ignacio Calas
- (Australia) Jaiden Christian
- (New Zealand) Ryan Cocker
- (Australia) Trent Dyer
- (South Africa) Mees Erasmus
- (Australia) Pama Fou
- (Australia) Harley Fox
- (Australia) Jed Gillespie
- (Australia) Eyda Haisila
- (Tonga) **Navarre Haisila**
- (Australia) David Horwitz
- (Australia) Zac Hough
- (Australia) Henry Hutchison
- (Australia) Ngalu Kavapalu
- (Australia) Boyd Killingworth
- (Japan) **Kentaro Kodama**
- (United States) **Tony Lamborn**
- (Australia) Jono Lance
- (Australia) Patrick Lavemai
- (Australia) Sione Lolesio
- (Australia) Antonio Masina
- (Australia) Jack McGregor
- (Australia) Declan Moore
- (New Zealand) Isaiah Mosese
- (Australia) Dallan Murphy
- (Australia) Lebron Naea
- (Australia) Joeli Niubalavu
- (Australia) Rory O'Connor
- (South Africa) Caylib Oosthuizen
- (Australia) **Hunter Paisami**
- (Australia) Divad Palu
- (New Zealand) Dennis Pili-Gaitau
- (Australia) Moses Poreo
- (Australia) **Harry Potter**
- (Fiji) Kitione Ratu
- (Fiji) Judah Saumaisue
- (Australia) Sebastian Sialau
- (Samoa) **James So'oialo**
- (Australia) Leafi Talataina
- (New Zealand) Tautalatasi Tasi
- (Australia) Chris Thomson
- (Australia) Alex Toolis
- (Tonga) **Sione Tui**
- (Australia) Taliu Tuia
- (Australia) Ah-mu Tuimalealiifano
- (Australia) Tavi Tuipulotu
- (Tonga) Ikapote Tupai
- (Fiji) Emosi Tuqiri
- (New Zealand) Junior Uelese
