= Manly Selective Campus =

Manly Selective Campus (part of the Northern Beaches Secondary College)

Location
- 138 Abbott Road, North Curl Curl, New South Wales; Australia; 33°45′46″S 151°16′54″E

Information
- Former names: Manly Public School; Manly Intermediate High School; Manly Boys High School; Manly High School
- Type: Government-funded co-educational academically selective secondary day school
- Motto: Latin: Capimus Sed Tradimus (What We Receive, We Pass On)
- Established: 1859; 167 years ago (as Manly Public School)
- School district: The Beaches; Metropolitan North
- Educational authority: New South Wales Department of Education
- Principal: Kathryn O'Sullivan
- Teaching staff: 59.5 FTE (2025)
- Years: 7–12
- Enrolment: 766 (2025)
- Houses: Woyan, Wulaba, Bayagin, Wulaba
- Colours: Navy blue, white and sky blue
- Yearbook: The Pines
- Website: nbscmanlys-h.schools.nsw.gov.au

The Manly Selective Campus of the Northern Beaches Secondary College is a government-funded co-educational academically selective secondary day school, located in North Curl Curl, a suburb on the Northern Beaches of Sydney, New South Wales, Australia.

Established in 1859 as Manly Public School, the campus caters for students from Year 7 to Year 12; and admission to the campus is based entirely on scores in the Selective High Schools Test. Students seeking enrolment into Years 8 to 11 are coordinated through the school, and must also sit for the Australian Council of Educational Research (ACER) Higher Ability Selection Test. The school is operated by the New South Wales Department of Education; the principal is Kathryn O'Sullivan.

== Overview ==
Manly Campus nearly tops the Northern Beaches on Merit List Rankings in the NSW Higher School Certificate (HSC), and came eighth in the state in 2014. It was placed seventh in the 2010, 2012 and 2021 HSC rankings, a leap from 15th in 2008 and 2009, and 20th in 2007.

== History ==
Manly Selective Campus has a long history after being founded in 1859 as Manly Public School, on the corner of Belgrave and Carlton Streets in Manly. In 1882, it was moved to a site in Darley Road, where it operated until 1945, and is the site of the current Manly Village Public School.

In 1925, the school became an Intermediate High School, and became solely a boys school from 1926. The school expanded rapidly and became Manly Junior High in 1944. In 1945, the school moved to the site of the current Balgowlah Boys Campus, and in 1949 had expanded to include senior years.

In 1954, student numbers reached 1200, and the bulk of these students moved to the current site on Abbott Road in North Curl Curl as Manly Boys High School. The school became co-educational in 1983 and was renamed Manly High School, at the same time as the nearby Manly Girls High also became co-educational and was renamed Freshwater High. Manly High was granted selective status in 1990 and was incorporated into the Northern Beaches Secondary College at its founding and given its current name in 2002.

== Students and staff ==
As of 2025 Manly Selective Campus had a student population of 766 students and 57 teaching staff. Of those students, 1% are indigenous and 61% have a language background other than English.

== Grounds ==
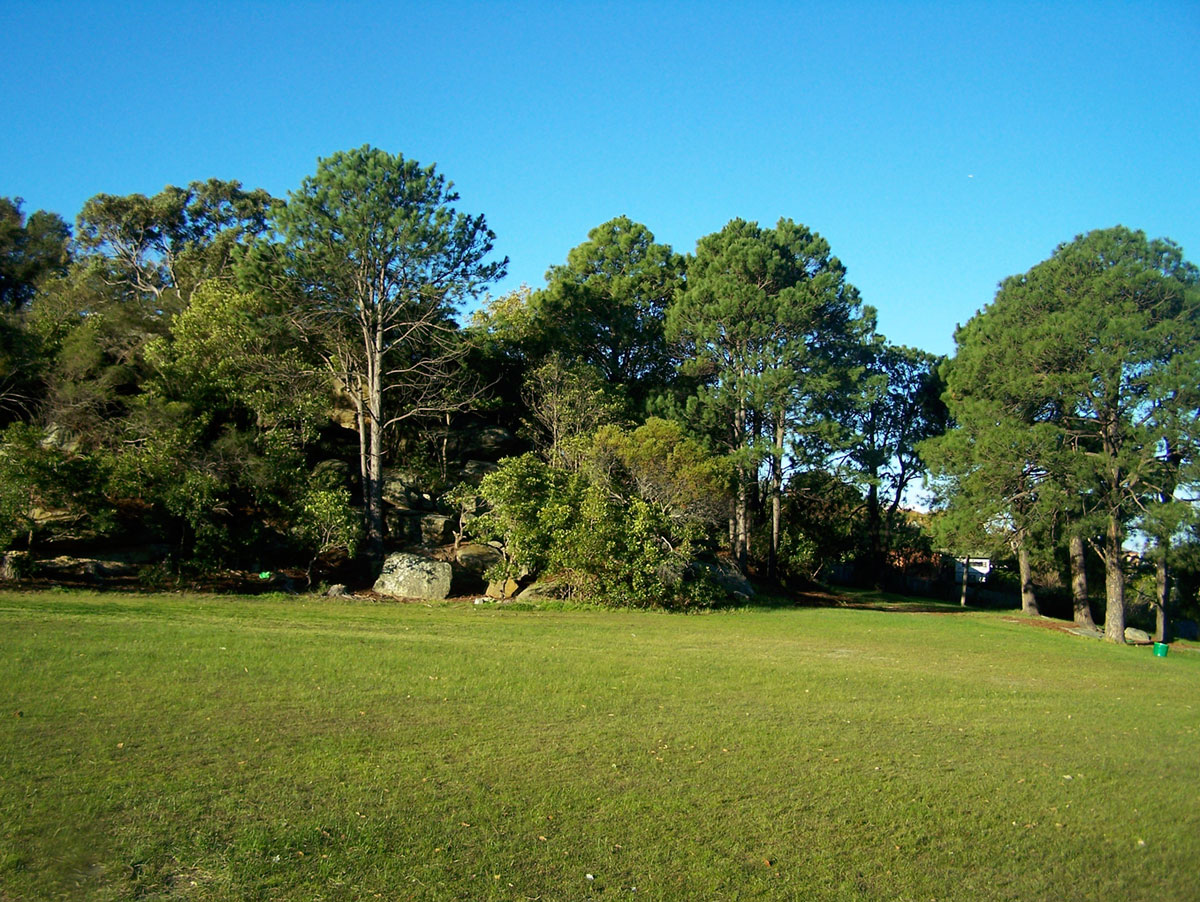
Manly Selective Campus' oval and remnant bushland area

One of the prominent images associated with Manly Selective Campus are the stands of radiata pines planted around the school, giving the name to the school's yearbook, The Pines and the newsletter, The Weekly Pines. Some of these pines have created a problem in a 7,010 m^{2} area of remnant bushland that lies on the school's property on a steep hill behind the school oval. Seedlings of the original pines grew up in the bushland after more of the radiata pines were planted in close proximity to the bushland in 1954. This bushland is some of the last remaining native Sandstone Heath east of Pittwater Road in Warringah, however sections of it are highly degraded by weeds such as lantana and asparagus fern. In recent years there has been an increasing effort to rehabilitate the heath back to pre-European quality, and in late 2006 many of the pine trees which had seeded in the bushland were removed.

== Extra-curricular activities ==
Students are given the chance to participate in various extracurricular activities, only some of which are listed below:

- Student Representative Council (SRC)
  - Manly School SRC
  - Middle Harbour/Peninsula Inter School Group SRC
  - Northern Sydney Regional SRC
  - NSW State SRC/NSW SRC State Conference Action Team
- Drama Ensemble
- BP Club

== Notable alumni ==
- Neville Chynoweth – seventh Bishop of Gippsland (1980–1987)
- Justine Damond – murdered by a Minneapolis Police Department officer
- Lisa Darmanin – Olympic silver medallist in sailing
- Midget Farrelly – world's first surfboard champion – attended approximately 1958
- Mark Gable – lead singer and songwriter with The Choirboys whose name was Mark Kitchen while attending the school
- Brad Hazzard – Member of Parliament of NSW (1991–2023) and NSW government minister (2011–2023)
- Reece Hodge – rugby union player for Australia and Super 15 side, Melbourne Rebels
- Max Illingworth – 2014 Australian Chess Champion and Grand Master
- Rex Mossop – rugby union and rugby league international and television sports commentator
- Doug Mulray – radio and TV host
- Glenn Murcutt – architect and winner of the Pritzker Prize in 2002
- Cadeyrn Neville – rugby union player for the ACT Brumbies and Wallabies
- Chris Puplick – Senator for New South Wales (1979–1981, 1984–1990)

== See also ==
- List of government schools in New South Wales
- List of selective high schools in New South Wales
- Education in Australia
