= Winifred Burston =

Australian pianist and teacher (1889–1976)

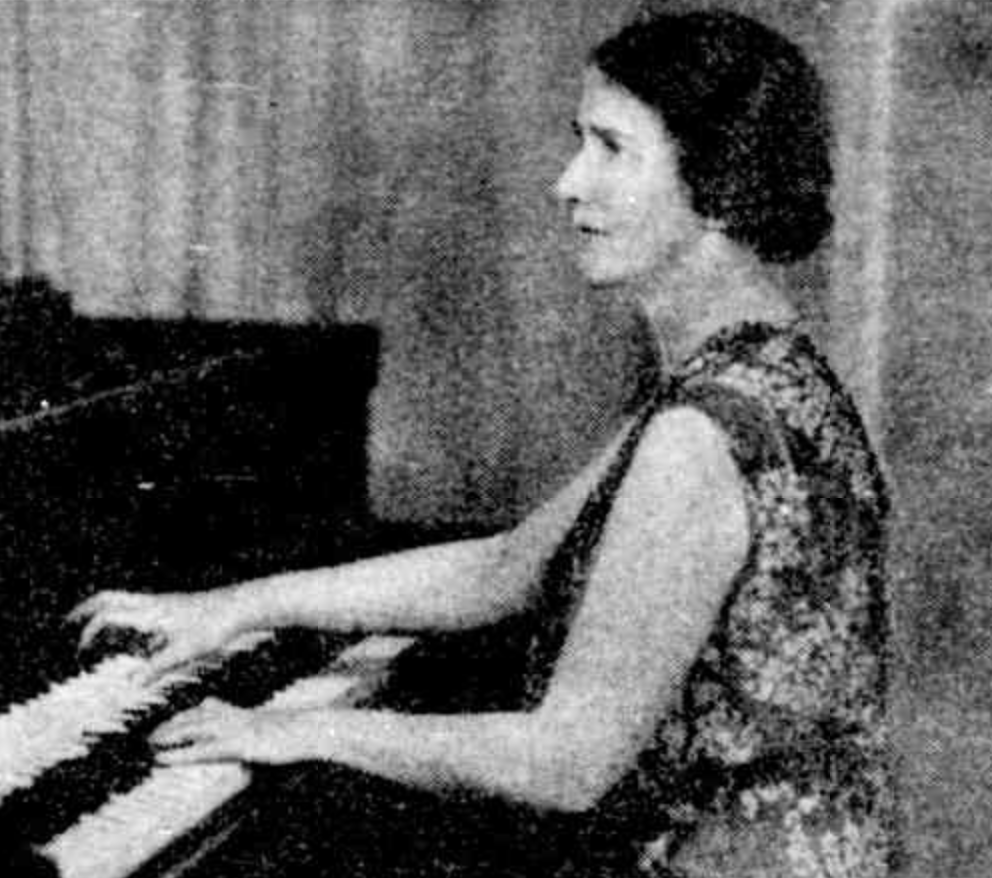
- Winifred Burston, c.1934
- Born: Winifred Charlotte Hillier Crosse Burston; 3 April 1889; Caboolture, Queensland
- Died: 24 June 1976 (aged 87); Edgecliff, Sydney
- Occupations: Pianist and music educator

Winifred Charlotte Hillier Crosse Burston (3 April 1889 – 24 June 1976) was an Australian pianist and teacher.

She was born near Caboolture, Queensland, of English-born parents, raised in Brisbane, and taught by her mother, an accomplished pianist. She studied first in Berlin from 1908, under Theodore Bohlmann. From there she went to the United States, teaching at the Cincinnati Conservatory. She went back to Berlin in 1911 to study with Ferruccio Busoni, who became a personal friend, and Egon Petri. She gave a recital at the Aeolian Hall, London, in 1913. From 1919 she taught at the New South Wales State Conservatorium of Music, Sydney. She encouraged the performance of new works from Europe and gave Australian premieres of such pieces as Busoni's Indian Fantasy (1914), Frederick Delius's Piano Concerto and some of Franz Liszt's later compositions.

From the 1930s Burston gave many recitals for the Australian Broadcasting Commission. She promoted piano music by Australian composers and developed an especially warm relationship with Roy Agnew, whose works she performed and whose music she introduced and taught to her pupils. She also travelled interstate as an examiner for the Australian Music Examinations Board until shortly before her death.

Her pupils included Geoffrey Parsons, Richard Meale and Larry Sitsky. Her interests extended beyond music to the arts generally, and she encouraged her students to read literature such as the works of William Faulkner and Gertrude Stein. While considered formidable, and having a direct, sometimes blunt manner, she was also a confidante to her pupils, who remembered her with great affection and remained in touch with her long after their study with her finished. Larry Sitsky remembered her in his Fantasia No. 2 in Memory of Winifred Burston (1980). He described her as "absolutely the right teacher. She was never dogmatic. Her ethos was that she would open doors and she would encourage you to explore. The repertoire wasn't fixed in any way".

Winifred Burston retired from the Conservatorium in 1964 and was succeeded by Gordon Watson. Some years earlier she and Watson had jointly guided Larry Sitsky to undertake study with Egon Petri, who had taught both of them.

She died on 24 June 1976 in Edgecliff, New South Wales and was cremated. A fund was established to endow a scholarship in her memory at the Canberra School of Music.

Later there was an attempt made to set up a music scholarship fund in Winifred Burston's honour. The initiators of the fund were Larry Sitsky, Alan Jenkins and Ken Henderson, and people such as Marjorie Hesse and Dame Joan Hammond were involved.
