= Mitchell Cox (rugby, born 1958) =

Australian rugby union international

- Full name: Mitchell Hunter Cox
- Born: 22 October 1958 (age 68) Manly, Sydney, Australia

Rugby union career
- Position: Utility back
Senior career
Years	Team	Apps	(Points)
- Manly
International career
Years	Team	Apps	(Points)
1981	Australia	2	(4)
- Rugby league career

Playing information
- Position: Five-eighth
Club
Years	Team	Pld	T	G	FG	P
1982–85	North Sydney	73				61
1986–87	Manly Warringah	21				4
	Total	94	0	0	0	65
- Education: Balgowlah Boys Campus
- Father: Brian Cox
- Relatives: Phillip Cox (brother)

Mitchell Hunter Cox (born 22 October 1958) is an Australian former rugby union international who represented Australia in two Test matches. He also played rugby league for North Sydney and Manly Warringah.

Born in Sydney, Cox is the son of Wallabies halfback Brian Cox. He attended Balgowlah Boys’ High School.

Cox, a utility back, made his New South Wales debut in 1980 alongside elder brother Phillip, a Wallabies scrum-half. He played first-grade rugby for Manly and ascended to the captaincy aged 22. After winning a place on the 1981–82 tour of Britain and Ireland, Cox was first capped for the Wallabies against Wales at Cardiff Arms Park and scored a debut try, then gained a second cap against Scotland at Murrayfield, with both of his appearances on the right wing.

Having resisted earlier offers, Cox switched codes in 1982, signing a three-year contract with North Sydney. A strong first season saw him named "Five-eighth of the Year" at the Dally M Awards and he came third in the Rothmans Medal count.

== See also ==
- List of Australia national rugby union players
