= Phillip Cox (rugby union) =

Australian rugby union player (born 1957)

- Full name: Phillip Anthony Cox
- Born: 2 August 1957 (age 69) Sydney, New South Wales, Australia
- Notable relative(s): Brian Cox (father); Mitchell Cox (brother)

Rugby union career
- Position: Scrum-half
International career
Years	Team	Apps	(Points)
1979–84	Australia	16	(0)

Phillip Anthony Cox (born 2 August 1957) is an Australian former rugby union international.

Cox, son of 1950s Wallabies halfback Brian Cox, was educated at Balgowlah Boys' High School in Sydney.

A Manly junior product, Cox made his first-grade debut for the club in 1978. By the end of the next year, he had claimed a place on the Wallabies squad to tour Argentina, making his Test debut in Buenos Aires at the age of 22. He was capped 16 times for the Wallabies in total, often forming a half-back partnership with Mark Ella. His career included the 1981–82 tour of Britain, where he was capped alongside his brother Mitchell in the Test against Wales, which made them the first Wallabies brothers since Jeff and Paul McLean. He made his final international appearances in 1984.

== See also ==
- List of Australia national rugby union players
