= Reece Hodge =

Australia international rugby union player

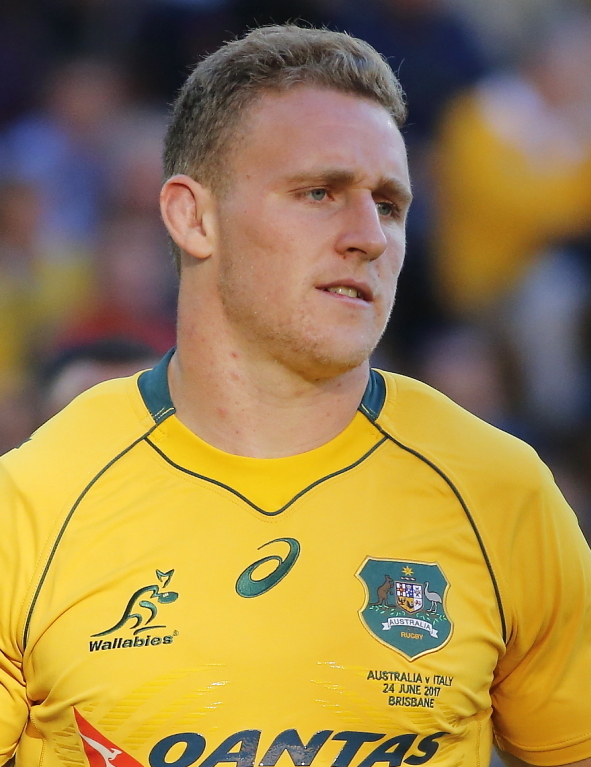
- Hodge with Australia in 2017
- Born: 26 August 1994 (age 32) North Sydney, New South Wales, Australia
- Height: 191 cm (6 ft 3 in)
- Weight: 94 kg (207 lb)
- School: Northern Beaches Secondary College; Manly Selective Campus
- University: University of Sydney

Rugby union career
- Position(s): Centre, Fullback, Fly-half
- Current team: Bayonne
Youth career
- –2012: Harbord Harlequins
- –2012: Northern Beaches Secondary College
Amateur team(s)
Years	Team	Apps	(Points)
2011–2015	Manly	21	(169)
- Correct as of 15 August 2015
Senior career
Years	Team	Apps	(Points)
2015	North Harbour Rays	7	(19)
2016–2023	Melbourne Rebels	100	(573)
2023–2026	Bayonne	7	(10)
- Correct as of 11 November 2026
International career
Years	Team	Apps	(Points)
2012	Australian Schoolboys	2	(7)
2013	Australia U20	3	(14)
2022	Australia A	1	(2)
2016–2023	Australia	62	(168)
- Correct as of 8 July 2023

Reece Hodge (born 26 August 1994) is an Australian professional rugby union player who plays as a centre and fullback. After playing his junior career primarily at fly-half, Hodge started his professional career in Super Rugby with the Melbourne Rebels, where he reached 100 appearances and became the team's most-capped player before his departure in 2023. Hodge most recently played for Top 14 club Bayonne in 2026.

== Career ==
=== Youth career ===
Hodge began playing rugby union in his youth with the Harbord Harlequins in 2001. Playing school rugby for Northern Beaches Secondary College (Manly Selective Campus), Hodge was an injury replacement in the 2012 Australian Schoolboys tour of Fiji and New Zealand. Before Hodge was called up to represent Australia in youth rugby, he was splitting his time between rugby and cricket. Hodge said in 2016: "Around 17 I was playing at state level cricket and rugby and splitting my time between them and it was only really after school when I was picked in the ARU National Academy that I gave up playing grade cricket to focus on rugby with the goal of eventually playing professionally."

=== Rebels ===
In August 2015, Hodge (20-years-old) signed to play for the Melbourne Rebels on a two-year deal after impressing with the Manly Marlins in the Shute Shield. After Hodge's first season with the Rebels, The Daily Telegraph reported that he had been offered a contract in 2014 to play for then-French and then-European champions Toulon, but he rejected the offer.

Hodge's first season with the Rebels was extraordinary, scoring nine tries in total (equal sixth), the most for the Rebels in 2016, adding eighteen points from the boot as well. Two of Hodge's tries came on debut against the Western Force, with Hodge scoring a total of twenty points. Starting at fullback, Hodge found himself at inside centre toward the latter half of the season, and was also deployed at outside centre as well. Upon reflection of Hodge's first season with the Rebels, CEO Baden Stephenson said: "Reece arrived at the Rebels and had an immediate impact, winning the competition’s Rookie of the Year award and becoming part of Michael Cheika's Wallabies squad," "He is a player that goes above and beyond for his club and his teammates. He is a consummate professional and is someone who embodies everything that the Melbourne Rebels stand for."

On the last round of the regular 2023 Super Rugby season, Hodge hit 100 appearances for the club.

=== Bayonne ===
In February 2023, Hodge was revealed to have signed for French Top 14 club Bayonne ahead of the 2023–24 season. He made his debut for the club in the 2023–24 Champions Cup against Glasgow Warriors, replacing outside centre Cheikh Tiberghien in the 49th minute. He played an additional six games in the Top 14, scoring two tries from the midfield.

During the opening rounds of the 2024–25 season, Hodge was announced by Bayonne as being unfit with a knee injury. By February 2025, Hodge, whom had not played a match for Bayonne in 18 months, was reportedly still in rehab with a knee issue. He was later reported to undergo surgery on his knee, ruling him out or the remainder of the season. By the end of the year, Hodge returned to Australia to recover from injury after receiving permission from Bayonne.

Hodge saw out his contract without playing another match at the end of the 2025–26 season.

== International career ==
Hodge was named in Michael Cheika's Wallabies camp in late May 2016, ahead of the England tour of Australia. He was an injury replacement for Mike Harris. Hodge remained in the squad for the remainder of the series. However he did not make an appearance for the Wallabies.

Hodge made his debut for Australia in the second round (27 August) of the 2016 Rugby Championship against New Zealand at Wellington Regional Stadium, Wellington. Coming on as a replacement for Adam Ashley-Cooper at right-wing, Hodge kicked a penalty goal in the thirty-fourth minute. Australia lost 29–9.

Hodge represented Australia A in 2022.

== Career statistics ==
=== Club ===
As of 11 November 2026.

Statistics by club, season and competition
Club	Season	League						
Club	Season	Division	Apps	Tries	Con.	Pen.	Drop	Points
North Harbour Rays	2015 (Note: In the 2015 NRC season, conversion goals were worth three points instead of the standard two.)	National Rugby Championship	7	2	3	0	0	19
Rebels	2016	Super Rugby	12	9	3	4	0	63
Rebels	2017	Super Rugby	15	4	10	26	0	118
Rebels	2018	Super Rugby	15	6	24	13	0	117
Rebels	2019	Super Rugby	15	7	0	4	0	47
Rebels	2020	Super Rugby	3	0	1	0	0	2
Rebels	2020	Super Rugby AU	9	4	0	2	0	26
Rebels	2021	Super Rugby AU	6	1	1	3	0	16
Rebels	2021	Super Rugby Trans-Tasman	—					
Rebels	2022	Super Rugby Pacific	12	4	12	7	0	65
Rebels	2023	Super Rugby Pacific	13	2	38	11	0	119
Rebels	Total		100	37	89	70	0	573
Bayonne	2023–24 (Note: One appearance in the 2023–24 Champions Cup.)	Top 14	7	2	0	0	0	10
Bayonne	2024–25	Top 14	—					
Bayonne	2025–26	Top 14	—					
Career total			114	41	92	70	0	602

=== International ===
As of 11 November 2026.

Statistics by team and year
Team	Year	Statistic					
Team	Year	Apps	Tries	Con.	Pen.	Drop	Points
Australia A	2022	1	0	1	0	0	2
Australia	2016	9	2	0	2	0	16
Australia	2017	14	4	9	4	0	50
Australia	2018	9	2	0	2	0	16
Australia	2019	6	4	0	1	0	23
Australia	2020	6	0	2	12	0	40
Australia	2021	9	1	2	0	0	9
Australia	2022	8	0	4	2	0	14
Australia	2023	1	0	0	0	0	0
Total		62	13	17	23	0	168

=== International tries ===
List of international tries scored by Reece Hodge
No.	Opponent	Location	Competition	Date	Result	Ref.
1	Wales	Millennium Stadium, Cardiff	2016 Autumn Internationals	5 November 2016	32–8	
2	Scotland	Murrayfield Stadium, Edinburgh	2016 Autumn Internationals	12 November 2016	23–22	
3	Italy	Lang Park, Brisbane	2017 June Tests	24 June 2017	40–27	
4	Argentina	Estadio Malvinas Argentinas, Mendoza	2017 Rugby Championship	7 October 2017	37–20	
5	Argentina	Estadio Malvinas Argentinas, Mendoza	2017 Rugby Championship	7 October 2017	37–20	
6	New Zealand	Lang Park, Brisbane	2017 Autumn International	21 October 2017	23–18	
7	New Zealand	Eden Park, Auckland	2018 Rugby Championship	25 August 2018	12–40	
8	South Africa	Nelson Mandela Bay Stadium, Port Elizabeth	2018 Rugby Championship	29 September 2018	12–23	
9	Argentina	Lang Park, Brisbane	2019 Rugby Championship	27 July 2019	16–10	
10	New Zealand	Perth Stadium, Perth	2019 Rugby Championship	10 August 2019	47–26	
11	New Zealand	Perth Stadium, Perth	2019 Rugby Championship	10 August 2019	47–26	
12	Fiji	Sapporo Dome, Sapporo	2019 Rugby World Cup	21 September 2019	39–21	
13	Argentina	North Queensland Stadium, Townsville	2021 Rugby Championship	25 September 2021	27–8	

== Personal life ==
Hodge married in the southern French town of Urrugne in July 2026. He is a permanent resident in France, and lives in the Basque region where he enjoys the cuisine and surfing.
