= Luke Callan =

Australian rugby union player

- Notable relative(s): Ollie Callan (brother)

Rugby union career
- Position(s): Lock / Back-row
Senior career
| Years | Team | Apps | (Points) |
| 2024 | Rebels | 1 | (0) |
| 2024-2025 | Yakult Levins Toda | 0 | (0) |

Luke Callan is an Australian professional rugby union player.

A product of Perth club Wanneroo, Callan is the younger brother of Western Force flanker Ollie and competes mainly as a lock. He joined the Western Force academy in 2021 and is a Wallabies under-20s representative player.

Callan was called into the Melbourne Rebels squad in 2024, making his Super Rugby Pacific debut in the penultimate round of the season, as a substitute against the Brumbies at GIO Stadium in Canberra.

== See also ==
- List of Melbourne Rebels players
