= Keli Lane =

Australian murderer

- Born: 21 March 1975 (age 51); Fairlight, New South Wales
- Occupation: Teacher
- Spouse: Patrick Cogan
- Children: 4 (one declared deceased by the NSW Coroner John Abernethy)
- Parent(s): Robert and Sandra Lane
- Status: Imprisoned
- Conviction: Guilty (2010)
- Criminal charges: 1996 murder of Tegan Lee Lane; 2003 making a false declaration (charged in 2009)
- Penalty: 18 years' jail with a non-parole period of 13 years and five months

Keli Lane (born 21 March 1975), is an Australian woman who was convicted of the 1996 murder of her newborn baby, Tegan, and of three counts of making a false declaration. Her final application for appeal of her conviction was rejected by the High Court of Australia in August 2014.

Lane was originally serving an 18-year prison sentence and was to be eligible for parole on 12 May 2024, after serving a period of 13 years and five months in custody. However, in accordance with "No body, no parole" laws in New South Wales, Lane was denied parole on 22 March 2024 and remains incarcerated in the Silverwater Women's Correctional Centre, a maximum-security facility in New South Wales.

== Early life ==
Lane is the daughter of Sandra Lane, a former hospital worker at Manly Hospital, and Robert Lane, a retired police officer. Educated at Mackellar Girls High School in Manly, Lane enrolled in an arts degree at the University of Newcastle from which she dropped out and started working part-time at Ravenswood School for Girls as a water polo coach. She went on to hold a position as sports convener at Ravenswood where her credentials are listed in the school year book as a degree qualified teacher with honours. Between 1994 and 1998, she was in a relationship with rugby union player Duncan Gillies. An elite water polo player at national and international level, Lane was a member of the silver medal-winning Australian Junior Women's team at the 1995 World Championships in Quebec, Canada in which she competed just months after giving birth to her first child, whom she gave up for adoption.

== Pregnancies ==
During her trial, the prosecution alleged that Lane became pregnant five times over seven years during the 1990s, terminating the first two pregnancies, placing the first and third babies up for adoption, and allegedly murdering the second.

After four failed attempts to be induced early at Ryde Hospital, on 12 September 1996, Tegan Lee Lane was delivered at around 38 weeks at Auburn Hospital. Less than two days later, and prior to being discharged, Lane left the hospital with Tegan at around 11 am-12 pm, and by 3 pm, she arrived at her parents' home alone. A few hours later, she then attended a friend's wedding dressed in white with her partner Duncan Gillies. There was no sign of or mention of Tegan.

In 1999, 25 weeks pregnant with her third child (i.e., her fifth pregnancy), Lane flew to Queensland to seek a late term abortion. She was refused due to the foetus being of a viable gestation. Three months later, in May 1999, Lane gave birth to a boy whom she decided to put up for adoption (as she did with her first-born child in 1995). Lane advised a social worker that this was her first child and that Gillies was the father. Gillies denied the claims.

== Investigations ==
=== Department of Community Services investigations ===
Prior to finding a permanent home for this child, a Department of Community Services (DOCS) child protection worker made further investigations that led to finding that the child born in 1999 was in fact not Lane's first child and that she had given birth in 1996 at Auburn Hospital. Further investigations revealed that Lane had also given birth in 1995, during her four-year relationship with Gillies. Gillies claimed he was completely unaware of Lane's pregnancies. When confronted with these allegations in October 1999, Lane initially denied the existence of the two earlier children. Several days later, she claimed that her daughter was living with a family in Perth. The matter was referred to local police who began investigations in late 1999.

=== Initial police investigations ===
In February 2001, Lane, who by now was seven months pregnant with her fourth child (i.e., pregnancy six), was interviewed by police. During the police interview, Lane claimed that she had given Tegan to the baby's father, a man called Andrew Norris (or Morris), with whom she claimed to have had a brief affair. According to Lane, the affair took place at a unit block in Balmain on Friday nights after a drinking session at the Town Hall pub. Lane alleges in her police interviews Norris' long-term partner, Melanie, also lived there as she often saw female apparel strewn around the unit. According to Lane, Melanie was in retail although she was not present at the unit on Friday nights.

During police interviews, Lane claimed that she felt forced to hide her pregnancies because of her fear of the reaction of her parents and friends as according to investigations she could not be sure who any of the fathers of the babies might be. She told police she handed the baby over to Norris in the Auburn Hospital car park but later changed this story to state it was inside the hospital foyer. It was reported that during the police interviews Lane said several times she felt alone when she became pregnant and told her mother in an intercepted phone call "I had no other choice", referring to why she gave the baby to Norris. Manly Police referred the matter to the New South Wales Coroner in 2005.

=== Coronial inquest ===
A coronial inquest into the disappearance of Tegan began in June 2005 and ran until February 2006. The inquest was presided over by the State Coroner, John Abernethy, and heard that police had undertaken an extensive search for the child, including attempting to match DNA samples. The inquest resulted in the coroner declaring that he was "... comfortably satisfied that Tegan Lane is in fact deceased..." and that he was concerned that Tegan had met with foul play, although he also stated that there still existed a possibility that she was alive somewhere. The Coroner ordered that a death certificate would be issued for Tegan and recommended that the brief of evidence and transcript of the coronial inquiry be forwarded to the New South Wales Homicide Squad for assessment and if necessary further investigation.

=== Subsequent police investigations ===
From 2006, police investigations focused on locating Norris, Melanie (Mel), and Noeline (Nana) Norris, Andrew Norris's mother, all alleged to have participated in or witnessed carriage of baby Tegan from Auburn Hospital. Despite nine documented versions of what happened that day, it was reported that police were unable to locate any persons who matched those profiles. Sightings of Norris were reported at the Sydney Aquarium but discounted as according to Caroline (Caro) Meldrum Hanna on the ABC Exposed Documentary post screening, Lane had told her "Andrew had no interest in water". Police also sought to locate Tegan Lane by searching the records of over 9,000 primary schools in Australia – a search process that lasted two years. Two girls named Tegan Lane were found in Queensland and another possibility was picked up on a Torres Strait island. Finally, police excluded all possible leads.

The police investigators, assessing that they had no conclusive evidence or any physical evidence pointing to Tegan's death, decided not to charge Lane; however, they referred the matter to the NSW Director of Public Prosecutions (DPP), Nicholas Cowdery. In what the National Times described as "an unusual step", on 17 November 2009, the DPP charged Lane with the murder of her daughter. Lane pleaded not guilty, and the matter went to trial by jury.

== Trial and aftermath ==
The matter was heard in the Supreme Court; presided over by Justice Anthony Whealy; with Mark Tedeschi, QC as the Crown Prosecutor; and Keith Chapple, SC defending Lane under instruction from Legal Aid; and began on 9 August 2010. The Crown alleged that Lane became pregnant five times over seven years during the 1990s; terminating the first two pregnancies, placing two babies up for adoption, and allegedly murdering her baby, Tegan, on 14 September 1996. The jury heard that Lane concealed her pregnancies from her family and friends in order to protect her personal image and reputation. According to Supreme Court judge Peter Hammill, who acted in her defence in 2006, images would have been destroyed by revelations of the salaciousness of her sex life centering around numerous rugby players from The Manly Marlins club over which Robert Lane presided.

The evidence heard at the trial was similar to that presented at the inquest four years earlier. The major differences were the police searches that occurred in between, and the discovery that Lane had left Auburn Hospital not at 2 pm on the day Tegan disappeared, but several hours earlier. The Crown produced evidence that, as a motive for murder, Lane was prepared to abandon her children at birth to increase her chances of representing Australia in water polo at the Sydney 2000 Olympic Games. There was also evidence she believed children would interfere with her educational plans, her social life, and the regard in which she was held by parents and friends. It was also alleged that her friends' wedding on 14 September may have been a crucial factor; as Lane sought a permanent solution to a potential problem to hide evidence of the pregnancy and birth from family and friends.

On 13 December 2010, the jury found Lane guilty of lying under oath in relation to documents dealing with her adopting out two other babies. The jury was not able to come to a unanimous verdict on the murder charge. Under advice from Whealy, the jury was given the option of returning a majority of 11 to one verdict. A little later on the same day, the jury found Lane guilty of murder of Tegan. Lane was refused bail.

=== Sentencing ===
Sentence procedures commenced on 11 March 2011, again in the Supreme Court before Whealy, with the Crown calling for the court to pay particular regard to general deterrence. It was reported that psychiatrist Michael Diamond, who appeared before the hearing on behalf of the Crown, found no evidence of a psychiatric disorder and that Lane's decisions appeared to be based on "problem solving". On 15 April 2011, Lane was sentenced to 18 years' jail expiring on 12 December 2028, with a non-parole period of 13 years and five months. She became eligible for parole on 12 May 2024.

=== Appeal and aftermath ===
Lawyers acting for Lane lodged an appeal against her conviction on 18 April 2011. The same day, claims were aired in the media that a taxi driver saw Lane dump a baby in bushland, en route to Manly.

Some news reports allege that, since being jailed, Lane has been attacked by other inmates, causing facial injuries. Lane has responded by denying such incidents.

An appeal was lodged and was heard in the New South Wales Court of Criminal Appeal between July and December 2013. The court dismissed the appeal, commenting that there was "ample" evidence available to the jury of Lane's guilt. Lane made a further application for leave to appeal to the High Court of Australia, and that application was rejected in August 2014.

Lane was denied parole on 22 March 2024 in accordance with the "No body, No parole" laws of New South Wales. While the law remains in force and as long as Lane is unable to satisfy the New South Wales State Parole Authority that she has co-operated satisfactorily in police investigations or other actions to identify the location of Tegan, she is likely to remain incarcerated until the expiry of her sentence on 12 December 2028.

In 2025, New South Wales MLC Sue Higginson revealed that Lane alleged she had been repeatedly sexually assaulted by Wayne Astill, a corrections officer at Dillwynia Correctional Centre, and harassed by other staff. Higginson also stated that Lane was a witness in the government inquiry against Astill, who was jailed in 2023 for assaulting multiple incarcerated women.

== Exposed: The Case of Keli Lane ==
In September 2018, the Australian Broadcasting Corporation aired a three-part documentary, an opinion piece, which featured interviews with Lane, conducted via numerous six-minute telephone calls from inside jail of which a small percentage were included and edited down for production space.
