= Beacon Hill High School (New South Wales) =

Location
- Beacon Hill, New South Wales; Australia; 33°45′4.54″S 151°15′29.66″E

Information
- Type: Public, co-educational, secondary school
- Motto: Progress.
- Established: 1964
- Status: Closed
- Closed: 2002
- Campus: Tristram Road, Beacon Hill
- Colours: Red, blue and gold

Beacon Hill High School (abbreviation: BHHS) also known for a time as Beacon Hill Technology High School is a former high school in the northern Sydney suburb of Beacon Hill, New South Wales, Australia. It was a co-educational high school operated by the New South Wales Department of Education and Training with students from years 7 to 12. The school was established in January 1964. However, due to declining enrolments the school was closed in December 2002, coinciding with the establishment of the Northern Beaches Secondary College. The last years were merged into Freshwater Senior Campus.

== Closure ==
In June 2000, the Department of Education and Training announced that the school would close because of falling enrolments. Following the announcement, local residents formed a committee to prevent the closure, and later to prevent a Government sale of the school site and make the site available for the community, known as the Retain Beacon Hill High School Committee.

The closure of the school was criticised by the Greens New South Wales Education spokesman, John Kaye, who said in a media release:

The demolition of Beacon Hill High School is a monument to poor planning, developer-driven government decisions and a deceitful and inadequate closure process. The closure and demolition of the school is a textbook case of short term thinking. This will leave the local community struggling for public education options within the next seven years.

The school site was sold by the state government in 2007 for a price in the vicinity of $8,750,000. The site was granted development approval by the Minister for Planning, and the school buildings were demolished in January 2007 to make way for a 26 allotment residential subdivision.

== Notable past students ==
- Tim Bedding – astrophysicist
- Ivan Cleary – Rugby League player and coach
- Chris Glassock – ABC radio sports reporter
- Bill Leak – editorial cartoonist for The Australian
- Nora Martin – author
- Callan Mulvey – actor
