= Mackellar Girls Campus =

Mackellar Girls Campus (part of the Northern Beaches Secondary College)

Location
- Campbell Parade, Manly Vale, Northern Beaches, Sydney, New South Wales; Australia; 33°46′55″S 151°16′20″E

Information
- Former name: Manly Vale High School; Mackellar Girls' High School
- Type: Government-funded single-sex comprehensive secondary day school
- Motto: In honour bound
- Established: 1968; 58 years ago (as Manly Vale High School)
- Sister school: Balgowlah Boys Campus
- School district: The Beaches; Metropolitan North
- Educational authority: New South Wales Department of Education
- Principal: Kyle Scott
- Staff: ~80
- Years: 7–12
- Gender: Girls
- Enrolment: ~1,040 (2025)
- Campus type: Suburban
- Colours: Blue, red, white
- Website: nbscmgirls-h.schools.nsw.gov.au

The Mackellar Girls Campus of Northern Beaches Secondary College, formerly Manly Vale High School and Mackellar Girls' High School, is a government-funded single-sex secondary day school for girls located in Manly Vale, a suburb on the Northern Beaches of Sydney, New South Wales, Australia.

== History ==
The exact history of Mackellar as a school is not well-known, but it is believed to have been a school prior to 1967, rather as a co-educational school. Prior to being established at the site in manly vale, it was a co-educational campus at the current location of primary school, Manly Village Public School. In 1968 Manly Vale High School was established, and then became Mackellar Girls' High School, named in honour of Dorothea Mackellar, in 2003. Under the name Manly Vale High School, the school was believed to have been reinvented as a girls home economics school in 1967, with the intention of creating strong and diligent girls to enter the workforce.

== Overview ==
Mackellar Girls Campus is a part of the Northern Beaches Secondary College, a five-campus college across Sydney's Northern Beaches, formed in 2003. It is generally considered to be the brother school to Balgowlah Boys Campus, another school within the College. It caters for approximately 1,200 students from Year 7 and Year 12.

The school is operated by the New South Wales Department of Education; the principal is Kyle Scott.

In 2015 it was ranked as the third top comprehensive girls' school in New South Wales. It was 116th in the NSW Higher School Certificate (HSC) rankings in 2015.

== Houses ==
Mackellar has a house system to facilitate school based competitions and activities. House activities include athletics, swimming carnivals and other sport related events. The school currently has four houses created based on the Aboriginal meanings for Australian native birds:

- Beabau – King parrot
- Gullary – White crane
- Moolgori – Black swan
- Tingee – Black cockatoo

== Notable alumni ==
- Layne Beachley, professional surfer, seven-time World Champion
- Elka Graham, Olympic swimmer, television presenter
- Brooke Hanson, Olympic gold medallist in swimming; former world-record holder
- Keli Lane, former water polo coach; convicted of infanticide, denied parole in 2024 and due for release in 2028
- Kim McKay, environmentalist
- Debbie Watson, Olympic water polo player, captained the winning Australian Waterpolo team at the 2000 Sydney Olympics
- Pip Williams, bestselling author, of The Dictionary of Lost Words and other works

== See also ==
- List of government schools in New South Wales
- Education in Australia
