= Brian Cox (rugby union) =

Australia international rugby union player (1928–2015)

- Full name: Brian Phillip Cox
- Born: 24 September 1928 Sydney, Australia
- Died: 13 June 2015 (aged 86) Sydney, Australia

Rugby union career
- Position: Scrum-half
International career
Years	Team	Apps	(Points)
1952–57	Australia	9	(3)

Brian Phillip Cox (24 September 1928 — 13 June 2015) was an Australian rugby union international. His two sons, Mitchell and Phillip Cox were also capped for Australia in rugby union.

A Shore School product, Cox was a scrum-half noted for his swift passes and made his New South Wales representative debut at the age of 19. He played his first-grade rugby for Manly.

Cox gained nine Wallabies caps from 1952 to 1957. After coming into the team for Cyril Burke, who had been a Wallabies regular since the end of the war, Cox played four consecutive internationals, including a win over the All Blacks in Christchurch. A fractured ankle then cost him a place on the 1953 tour of South Africa and thereafter the selectors alternated between him and Burke as preferred scrum-half. He made his last Test appearance in 1957 and was considered unfortunate to miss selection for the 1957–58 tour of Britain, Ireland and France.

== See also ==
- List of Australia national rugby union players
