= Freshwater Senior Campus =

Freshwater Senior Campus (part of the Northern Beaches Secondary College)

Location
- Curl Curl, Northern Beaches, Sydney, New South Wales; Australia; 33°46′6″S 151°16′47″E

Information
- Former names: Manly Girls High School; Freshwater High School
- Type: Government-funded co-educational comprehensive senior secondary day school
- Motto: Freedom to Learn
- Established: 1983; 43 years ago (as Manly Girls High School)
- School district: The Beaches; Metropolitan North
- Educational authority: New South Wales Department of Education
- Principal: Chantelle Phair
- Years: 11–12
- Enrolment: 650 (2021)
- Campus type: Suburban
- Colours: Black, white and yellow
- Website: nbscfreshw-h.schools.nsw.gov.au

The Freshwater Senior Campus (known locally as Freshie) of Northern Beaches Secondary College is a government-funded co-educational comprehensive senior secondary day school, located in Curl Curl, a suburb on the Northern Beaches of Sydney, New South Wales, Australia.

Established in 1983 as Manly Girls High School, and then became Freshwater High School, the school caters to approximately 650 students from Year 11 to Year 12. The school is operated by the New South Wales Department of Education; the principal is Chantell Phair.

== Overview ==
Freshwater Senior Campus is a part of the Northern Beaches Secondary College, a five-campus college across Sydney's Northern Beaches, formed in 2003. Although the campus is located within the suburb of Curl Curl, the school takes the name from the nearby suburb of Freshwater.

The site began life as Manly Girls High School, as a single-sex sister school for girls only to Manly Boys High School, a single-sex school for boys only, now re-constituted as the co-educational selective Manly Selective Campus. In 1983 Freshwater High School was formed as a co-educational school catering for students from Year 7 to Year 12. During 2002 and 2003 Freshwater High School was re-constituted as the Freshwater Senior Campus of Northern Beaches Secondary College.

The campus was first used in its current role in Term 2 of 2003, while still under construction. At that time students of the newly formed campus moved from the previous Beacon Hill High School site.

Freshwater has an enrolment of approximately 650 students and has approximately 65 teaching staff. Students enroll at Freshwater Campus for the final two years of high school.

The school has implemented a number of programs designed to aid in the pastoral care of its students. All enrolled students meet regularly in small groups with an assigned teacher as a mentor. These small groups are approach and discuss issues of late adolescent development, study skills, transition from school to work or tertiary study and other issues of importance to students. Intellectually disabled and international students are supported by more individualised support from the staff.

== See also ==
- List of government schools in New South Wales
- Education in Australia
