= Sebastian Sialau =

Australian rugby union player

- Born: 20 December 2003 (age 22) Samoa
- Height: 180 cm (5 ft 11 in)
- Weight: 97 kg (15 st 4 lb)
- School: Fountain Gate Secondary College

Rugby union career
- Position: Fly-half / Centre / Fullback
- Current team: Chugoku Red Regulions
Senior career
Years	Team	Apps	(Points)
2022	Rebels	0	(0)
2023–2024	Hanazono Kintetsu Liners	0	(0)
2025–	Chugoku Red Regulions	15	(39)
- Correct as of 6 October 2025

Sebastian Sialau (born 20 December 2003) is an Australian rugby union player, who plays for Chugoku Red Regulions in Japan Rugby League One. His preferred position is fly-half, centre or fullback.

== Early career ==
Sialau was born in Samoa, but moved to Australia as a child. He attended Fountain Gate Secondary College in Victoria, before finishing his education at Toowoomba Grammar School. He plays his club rugby for Melbourne Harlequins and was a member of the Victoria academy and Melbourne Rebels academy from 2016.

== Professional career ==
Sialau signed for the Rebels for the 2022 Super Rugby Pacific season, having previously been a member of their Elite Pathway. He joined Hanazono Kintetsu Liners ahead of the 2023 Japan Rugby League One season, but did not make an appearance in the top league. Ahead of the 2025 season, he joined Chugoku Red Regulions, making eleven appearances in the 2025 Japan Rugby League One season and one of three professional players.
