= Lyka (company) =

Australian pet food company

- Company type: Private limited company
- Industry: Pet food
- Founded: 2018
- Founder: Anna Podolsky & Matthew Muir
- Headquarters: Sydney, Australia
- Website: lyka.com.au

Lyka is an Australian pet food company based in Sydney. Founded in 2018, Lyka produces fresh dog food sold direct-to-consumer through an e-commerce platform.

== History ==
Lyka was founded in 2018 by Anna Podolsky, a former management consultant at Bain & Company, and veterinarian Matthew Muir. Their subscription pet food model was met by a surge of pet ownership during the COVID pandemic.

In 2021, the company raised A$6.5 million in Series A funding from Shearwater Capital and Wattle Hill Capital, followed by a round of A$30 million in 2022. In 2023, the company received an additional A$25 million investment from StepStone Group.

The company attained B Corp Certification in 2023.
