= The Coffee Club =

Australian café chain

The Coffee Club Franchising Company Pty Ltd

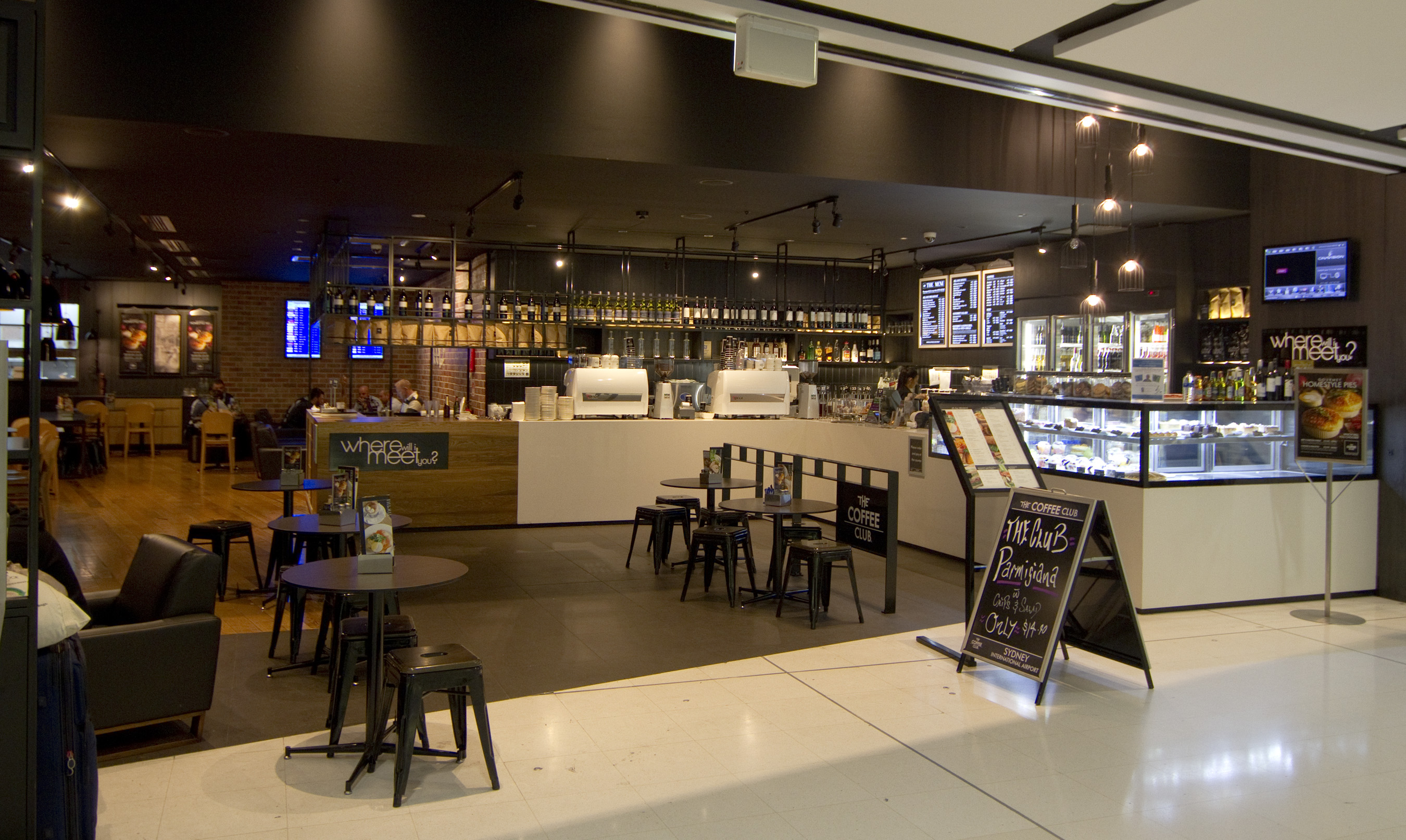
- Coffee Club cafe at Sydney Airport
- Trade name: The Coffee Club
- Industry: Restaurants, café
- Founded: 2 November 1989
- Founder: Emmanuel Kokoris, Emmanuel Drivas
- Headquarters: South Brisbane, Queensland, Australia
- Number of locations: 300 stores (Australia 2019); 60+ stores (NZ 2019); 60+ stores (Thailand 2019)
- Area served: Asia-Pacific
- Key people: John Lazarou (co-owner, director)
- Products: Coffee, modern cuisine
- Number of employees: 8000 (2022)
- Website: coffeeclub.com.au

The Coffee Club is an Australian multinational coffeehouse-style café chain. Originally created in 1989 as a place to get "an excellent coffee", the concept includes cafébar/restaurant stores with expanded menus and full table service.

The Coffee Club has over 400 stores in 15 countries including Australia, New Zealand, Thailand, the UAE, China, Vietnam, Indonesia, Seychelles, Maldives, Cambodia and Singapore.

== History ==
In 1989, friends Emmanuel Kokoris and Emmanuel Drivas were searching for a late-night cup of coffee in Brisbane. Their unsuccessful attempt led them to plan a new business venture: The Coffee Club, which rested on the Greek concept of 'philoxenia' - hospitality to strangers. The first store opened on 2 November 1989 at Eagle Street Pier in Brisbane. On 1 July 1994 The Coffee Club became a franchise.

In November 2005 the first international store was opened in Wellington, New Zealand, by master franchisees Bradley Jacobs and Andy Lucas. As of 2021, they have over 65 stores all around New Zealand. In October 2007, Thai company Minor International announced it would acquire a 50% stake in The Coffee Club. The move not only advanced plans to expand The Coffee Club into Asia and the Middle East but also assists expansion of brands such as Swensen's ice creams into Australia. Minor International paid more than $23 million for their share of The Coffee Club. The first Thai store opened in December 2008.

In September 2011, The Coffee Club group acquired Australian steakhouse chain Ribs and Rumps, which Drivas says is a family-friendly brand "appealing to the same customer base" as The Coffee Club. As at October 2013, The Coffee Club at Brisbane Airport was the busiest in Australia; Townsville's Domain retail centre was the second busiest.

In 2021 The Coffee Club was inducted into the Queensland Business Leaders Hall of Fame in recognition of its development from Australia’s largest coffee retail business into a major international brand. In October 2022, The Coffee Club opened its first outlet in Singapore under the rebranded name C Australia’s Coffee Club.

== Responsible business practices ==
In 2009, The Coffee Club joined the UTZ Certification program, promoting fair and sustainable coffee production. In 2011, The Coffee Club joined the RSPCA's "Choose Wisely" campaign, promoting humane food production.

== See also ==
- List of coffeehouse chains
- List of restaurant chains in Australia
