= Northern Beaches Secondary College =

- Northern Beaches, New South Wales; Australia

Information
- Type: Government-funded co-educational dual-modality partially selective and comprehensive secondary day school
- Motto: Innovation Excellence Choice
- Established: 2003; 23 years ago
- Educational authority: New South Wales Department of Education
- Principal: Dane Ropa
- Enrolment: 4,800 (2022)
- Campuses: Balgowlah Boys'; Cromer; Freshwater Senior; Mackellar Girls'; Manly Selective
- Campus type: Suburban
- Colour: Vary between campuses
- Website: nbsc.schools.nsw.gov.au

The Northern Beaches Secondary College (abbreviated as NBSC) is a multi-campus government-funded co-educational dual-modality partially selective and comprehensive secondary day school, located on the Northern Beaches of Sydney, New South Wales, Australia.

The College was established 2003 through the merger and restructure of six existing campuses located in the northern beaches region. The College caters for approximately 4,800 students from Year 7 to Year 12. The school is operated by the New South Wales Department of Education; the principal is Dane Ropa, who leads the College.

== Campuses ==
The five campuses that comprise the Northern Beaches Secondary College, are:

1. Balgowlah Boys Campus, a single-sex comprehensive secondary school for boys only, from Year 7 to Year 12;
2. Cromer Campus, a co-educational comprehensive secondary school, from Year 7 to Year 12;
3. Freshwater Senior Campus, a co-educational senior secondary school, from Year 11 to Year 12;
4. Mackellar Girls Campus, a single-sex comprehensive secondary school for girls only, from Year 7 to Year 12; and
5. Manly Selective Campus, a co-educational, selective secondary school, from Year 7 to Year 12.

== History ==
The establishment of the Northern Beaches Secondary College resulted from a review of secondary education, conducted by the Northern Beaches Secondary Principals Council, in 1999. The Secondary Education Review Committee was set up to investigate and report on the provision of secondary education in the Northern Beaches District. Representatives from all stakeholders, secondary and primary schools, parents, the NSW Teachers Federation, Department of Education and Training, the District P&C Association and Technical and Further Education (TAFE), were invited to be part of this committee.

The Committee conducted a district wide review of secondary education which resulted in over 50 submissions from individuals, groups and stakeholder. These were submitted to the Committee in December, 1999. From these submissions the Committee then developed a series of recommendations which forwarded to the Department of Education and Training. The Department, in consultation with the District, developed a model for the restructuring of secondary education in the lower peninsula area of the Northern Beaches. This model was launched in June 2000, by the then Minister for Education and Training, the Hon. John Aquilina, under the name of New Horizons.

The model proposed by the Department saw six of the existing 7–12 high schools restructured as a multi-campus College. The six existing high schools were:

- Balgowlah Boys High School – boys only; Year 7–12
- Beacon Hill High School – co-educational; Year 7–12
- Freshwater High School – co-educational; Year 7–12
- Cromer High School – co-educational; Year 7–12
- Manly High School – co-educational and selective; Year 7–12
- Mackellar Girls High School – girls only; Years 7–12

A concept document for the Freshwater Senior Campus was launched in the New South Wales Legislative Assembly in early March 2001 by the then Minister, The Hon. John Aquilina. This document was to inform the development of the 'Freshwater Education Centre' which comprises the Northern Beaches Secondary College – Freshwater Senior Campus, TAFE NSW Northern Sydney Institute – Freshwater facility and the College Administration Centre. The document also outlined the relationship of these two to the University of Technology, Sydney, the third party to the New Horizons concept.

The inaugural College Principal, John Hayes, was appointed in March 2001 and a period of intense development followed. A College Administration Centre was set up at Northern Beaches District Office and a College Development Co-ordinator appointed at the beginning of April 2001. During 2001 a College Deputy Principal and three Head Teachers joined the College Administration Centre. The role of the College Administration team was to ensure the successful implementation of the College model.

Of importance in the Northern Beaches Secondary College model is the presence of five senior Campuses which have a coordinated curriculum giving students the opportunity to study on more than one Campus of the College during their senior years. The College operates a bus between Campuses.

The College, in its final configuration, came into existence with the movement of students onto the new Freshwater Senior Campus at the beginning of Term 2, 2003. Freshwater Senior Campus students are given first priority when enrolments are considered.

In February 2025, students staged a mass walkout in protest over plans to develop the senior campus.

== See also ==
- List of government schools in New South Wales
- List of selective high schools in New South Wales
- Education in Australia
