= John Lazarou =

Australian businessman (born 1962)

- Born: 25 June 1962 (age 64); Brisbane, Australia
- Spouse: Maria
- Children: Rhys, Krystiana, Velecia and Sebby

John Lazarou (born 25 June 1962) is an Australian businessman and one of the owners of The Coffee Club chain of coffee shops. Lazarou is also known for his philanthropic work with non-profit organisations.

In 1958, Lazarou's parents and three of his siblings migrated from Rhodes, Greece to Australia in 1958. Lazarou and two more siblings were born in Australia. Lazarou left school to start an apprenticeship at the age of 15. Lazarou opened his own hair salon at the age of 17, while still an apprentice. He found himself the boss of a senior hairdresser to whom he was apprenticed. In his teenage years he also worked in the Brisbane business Gambaros.

In 1989, Lazarou came on board as duty manager of The Coffee Club, then a brand new business. Lazarou bought into The Coffee Club two years later and over time helped build one of Australia's largest franchise operations—As of 2022, The Coffee Club operates over 400 stores worldwide.
