= The Betoota Advocate =

Australian satirical news website

- The Betoota Advocate front page on 8 September 2017.
- Type: Satirical news website
- Format: Website
- Owner: Diamantina Consolidated Holdings Pty Ltd
- Founder(s): Archer Hamilton; Charles Single; Piers Grove
- Founded: 2014
- Headquarters: Sydney, Australia
- Website: betootaadvocate.com

The Betoota Advocate is an Australian satirical news website and digital media company that publishes articles on international, national, and local news. The site puts a comedic spin on current news topics and broader social observations. The site is based in inner Sydney, but takes its name from the deserted regional town of Betoota, Queensland.

== History ==
=== Origins ===
The site was started in 2014 by journalists Archer Hamilton and Charles Single, who began working on the idea for The Betoota Advocate after meeting publisher Piers Grove through their work in the media industry. Single, formerly a writer for The Canberra Times, had lost his job in a wave of redundancies at the newspaper, and Hamilton had become disillusioned working in political campaigning for NGOs following a short stint at Hill FM as a newsreader. The pair, who attended Charles Sturt University together, teamed up with Grove, an entrepreneur and executive producer of the ABC satirical news show The Roast, to create the site.

The trio run The Betoota Advocate in Alexandria, Sydney, alongside a PR consultancy. Hamilton and Single both work as writers for the publication, operating under the pen-names Clancy Overell and Errol Parker—alter-egos for which they remain in character in nearly all public and media appearances.

The idea for the site stems from an idea Hamilton originally had to create a conservative newspaper in his hometown of Mitchell, Queensland. Hamilton had grown up near Mitchell where his parents worked as graziers, before moving to Brisbane in the 1990s. Hamilton's love for the oddities of living in a country town led to the idea's transformation into a satirical publication. Single also hails from the country and worked as a jackaroo at Nockatunga Station in Queensland prior to starting university.

=== Growth in popularity ===
The Betoota Advocate has grown to be Australia's most popular satirical news site, garnering a larger readership within Australia than popular U.S. satire site The Onion and Australian site The Shovel. It places an emphasis on highlighting Australian youth culture and lampooning contemporary issues in a sarcastic manner, including through the use of slang and colloquialisms. Its growing readership base is driven largely via its presence on Facebook. The popularity and consequential virality of its posts is described by the pair as being a result of their ability to scan through the news and put their spin on the topics of the moment, with Single suggesting that the site seeks to "make the line between what's real and what's not even blurrier".

Alongside its ordinary satirical posts, the website has also run video interviews with high-profile politicians, including former Prime Ministers Malcolm Turnbull, Bill Shorten and then Deputy Prime Minister Barnaby Joyce, with Hamilton and Single taking on their alter-egos, Overell and Parker, in both. In 2016, the pair were involved in a controversial television ad for politician Bob Katter's re-election campaign, in which they appeared in character.

=== Business model ===
The Betoota Advocate is funded via advertising revenue and sponsored brand placements within articles. Through their PR firm, the trio work with brands that wish to be mentioned in articles but do not want to be formally associated with the controversial publication. In May 2017, the site moved into branded content when it released an advertisement via its Facebook page in which characters Overell and Parker endorse superannuation company Grow Super. In August 2017, it launched a similar campaign for Virgin Mobile.

Products making use of the Betoota brand have also been launched. In October 2016, the site published a book, The Betoota Advocate Round-Up, consisting of a compilation of articles sourced from the website. In January 2017, the site teamed up with Sydney brewery Yulli's Brews to launch a branded line of beer, Betoota Bitter, to be made available at a number of pubs throughout Australia. The site aims to expand the beer's availability into regional towns that share an affinity with the broader Betoota Advocate brand. In September 2017, the beer was made available for purchase online in an effort to diversify the website's revenue streams.

=== Television ===
In November 2021, it was announced that Warner Bros. International Television Production (WBITP) had partnered with The Betoota Advocate to produce a slate of premium, unscripted television productions for domestic and international markets. In March 2023, streaming service Paramount+ announced that it would air The Betoota Advocate Presents, a satirical comedy documentary series that investigates modern Australian controversies, which premiered on 14 June 2023.

== Controversies ==
Several Betoota Advocate articles have been mistaken for real news items by major Australian media outlets. In November 2014, Weekend Today reported as fact a Betoota Advocate article about a Sydney city parking ranger who accidentally booked himself. In January 2015, Deadspin reported that the 2016 Olympics would have 3-on-3 basketball, before realising that the source was a satire site. In March 2015, 4BC reported as fact a Betoota Advocate article about a 78-year-old man fighting off a home invasion.

The website has also attracted criticism over the way it has portrayed certain individuals and organisations. In December 2014, the RSPCA Australia criticised the site for publishing an article announcing that it was trialling having veterinarians present at dog fights in Queensland without making it clear that the story was satire, as well as including made-up quotes attributed to them in the article. In October 2015, former Wallabies captain John Eales criticised The Betoota Advocate for an article attributing to him a quote that referred to Australian-born fans of the All Blacks as being "worse than ISIS". In February 2017, Queensland MP Leanne Donaldson said that the site had "missed the mark" by making light of Bundaberg's problems with alcohol fuelled violence after it published an article suggesting that the town would be building a giant statue of a black eye.

== See also ==
- List of satirical magazines
- List of satirical news websites
- List of satirical television news programs
