= Sue Funch =

Australian swimmer

Personal information
- Born: 24 June 1955 (age 71)

Sport
- Sport: Swimming
- Strokes: butterfly

Sue Funch (born 24 June 1955) is an Australian former butterfly swimmer. She competed in three events at the 1972 Summer Olympics.
