= Marjorie Hesse =

Australian pianist and composer

Marjorie Hesse MBE DSCM B.A. LRSM LMusA
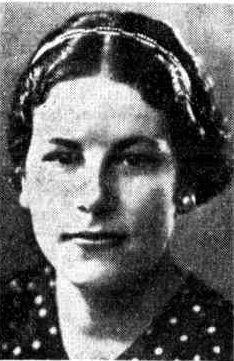
- Marjorie Hesse in 1935. Photo by H. Noel Maitland
- Born: 13 November 1911; Brisbane
- Died: 1986 (aged 74–75)
- Education: B.A.
- Alma mater: NSW State Conservatorium of Music; University of Sydney
- Occupations: Pianist; Lecturer; Composer
- Spouse: Tibor Kereny
- Honours: MBE

Marjorie Anne Hesse, MBE, DSCM, B.A., LRSM, LMusA was an Australian pianist, lecturer, examiner, and composer.

== Early life and education ==
Hesse was born in Brisbane on 13 November 1911. She began piano lessons in Ipswich, Queensland and was recognised as a child prodigy. She attended the Brisbane State High School.

When she was 15, Hesse moved to Sydney with her family. Her mother ran a boarding house in Darlinghurst where Hesse also worked and often performed in the evenings. In 1927, Hesse won the National Prize for Piano and Harmony from Trinity College London as the best candidate in the British Commonwealth. She joined the NSW State Conservatorium of Music in 1928 where she studied piano with Frank Hutchens, composition with Alfred Hill and Mirrie Hill, and attained diplomas (DSCM) in teaching and performance in 1931. In her second year at the Conservatorium she achieved the £50 Grade 1 scholarship for the highest marks in the State. Her first recital at the Conservatorium was in 1932 and featured one of her own compositions, All Suddenly the Wind Comes Soft, based on a poem by Rupert Brooke.

Hesse also achieved a piano scholarship from the AMEB in 1930 for outstanding performance.

== Career ==
=== Commonwealth tour ===
In 1936, Hesse began a Commonwealth tour with contralto Alice Prowse and violinist Phyllis MacDonald under direction of the ABC. The tour programmes were varied, consisting of British, Italian, French, Romantic, and Australian music. Hesse's own compositions (All Suddenly the Wind Comes Soft and The Piper) were also featured.

=== Europe and America ===
Hesse travelled to London shortly before World War II. She was invited by the Italian tenor Dino Borgioli to accompany his students, including Australian soprano Joan Hammond. Hesse was also assistant artist with Richard Tauber at the Royal Empire Society concerts.

In August 1939 Hesse had arrived in Germany but was one of the many people who hurriedly travelled to Paris ahead of the War. From Paris, she then returned to London where she was a student at the Royal College of Music, studying composition with Gordon Jacob. She also broadcast performances from the BBC. It was reported that she may have been the last performer to give a Dominions broadcast on the BBC before the outbreak of World War II, performing in a BBC bomb-proof basement and broadcasting to Canada only a few hours before the invasion of Poland.

Hesse and her mother travelled to New York on the RMS Aquitania - one of the first British passenger ships to leave England after the declaration of war. While in the US she taught, studied fugue-writing at the Juilliard School, and gave recitals of Australian music along with Alice Prowse. One of these recitals took place at the Rockefeller Center where Hesse performed works by herself, Alfred and Mirrie Hill, and Percy Grainger who also attended the concert. Hesse was forced to return to Australia in October 1940 after she could no longer receive funds.

In the 1950s, Hesse travelled to both Europe and Canada for a two-year tour where she gave recitals and studied music teaching methods.

=== Academia ===
From 1936-1981, Hesse was a lecturer in Piano Studies and faculty member at NSW State Conservatorium of Music. When she joined, she was the youngest member of the professorial staff. She retired at the age of 70.

Hesse achieved a B.A. in English and Anthropology at University of Sydney in December 1944.

=== Composition and adjudication ===
Hesse was appointed as an examiner for AMEB. She was also appointed adjudicator for the instrumentals section of the Launceston Eisteddfod in 1948.

Hesse was a prolific composer of pedagogical piano music with published books of Children's Suites, violin and piano solos, and songs.

== Personal life ==
Hesse married Hungarian engineer Tibor Kereny in December 1944, three days after completing her BA. Outside of her music career she enjoyed photography and baking.

In 1975, Hesse was awarded an MBE for her services to music.

== Selected works ==
=== Piano ===
- Twilight (1937)
- The Piper (1939)
- All Suddenly the Wind Comes Soft (1939)
- The ballerina (1961)
- Playtime (1961)
- When We Are Very Young (1936) (Book of piano composition for children)
- Growing Up (Book of piano composition for children)

=== Piano and violin ===
- An Irish Croon (Written for violinist Phyllis McDonald)

=== Songs ===
Hesse's songs were often broadcast on radio, although some were unpublished works.

- O, Singer in Brown (Words by Mary Gilmore)
- In Early Green Summer (Words by Joan Mackaness)
