= Jaiden Christian =

Australian rugby union player

- Born: Hastings, New Zealand
- Height: 190 cm (6 ft 3 in)
- School: Brisbane State High School

Rugby union career
- Position: Prop
- Current team: Canterbury
Senior career
Years	Team	Apps	(Points)
2023	Rebels	0	(0)
2024–	Canterbury	3	(0)
- Correct as of 11 December 2024

Jaiden Christian is an Australian rugby union player, who plays for Canterbury in the National Provincial Championship. His preferred position is prop.

== Early career ==
Christian attended Brisbane State High School where his performances earned him selection for the Reds Academy in 2019. He plays his club rugby for Brothers in Brisbane, where he plays alongside his brother Mosiah.

== Professional career ==
Christian signed for the Rebels for the 2023 Super Rugby Pacific season, having previously been a member of their Elite Pathway. Though signed, he did not feature in any matches, and returned to Queensland club rugby in 2024. In 2024, he crossed the Tasman and first played club rugby for Belfast RFC, before being called into the Canterbury squad as a replacement player for the 2024 Bunnings NPC.
