= Balgowlah Boys Campus =

Balgowlah Boys Campus (part of the Northern Beaches Secondary College)

Location
- Maretimo Street, Balgowlah, New South Wales; Australia; 33°47′47″S 151°15′17″E

Information
- Former name: Balgowlah Boys High School
- Type: Government-funded single-sex comprehensive secondary day school
- Established: 1954; 72 years ago (as Balgowlah Boys High School)
- Sister school: Mackellar Girls Campus
- School district: Northern Beaches
- Educational authority: New South Wales Department of Education
- Oversight: NSW Education Standards Authority
- Principal: Richard Medcalf
- Teaching staff: 78.2 FTE (2023)
- Years: 7–12
- Gender: Boys
- Enrolment: 1142 (2023)
- Campus type: Suburban
- Website: nbscbalgb-h.schools.nsw.gov.au

The Balgowlah Boys Campus of Northern Beaches Secondary College is a government-funded single-sex comprehensive secondary day school for boys only, located in Balgowlah, a suburb on the Northern Beaches of Sydney, New South Wales, Australia.

Established in 1954 as Balgowlah Boys High School, the campus enrolled approximately 1142 students in 2023 from Year 7 to Year 12, of whom one percent identified as Indigenous Australians and 26 percent were from a language background other than English. The school is operated by the NSW Department of Education in accordance with a curriculum developed by the New South Wales Education Standards Authority; the principal is Richard Medcalf.

== Overview ==
Balgowlah Boys Campus is a part of the Northern Beaches Secondary College, a five-campus college across Sydney's Northern Beaches, formed in 2003. The school was previously a High School. Balgowlah Boys Campus is also school, in Manly.

== Notable alumni ==
- John Edwards – television drama producer
- Wayne Jarratt – actor on stage and television
- David Oldfield – politician, co-founded and was deputy leader of One Nation
- Wycliff Palu – former rugby union player for NSW Waratahs and Wallabies
- George Smith – former rugby union player
- Jack Vidgen – singer

== Notable staff ==
- Paul Couvret

== See also ==
- List of government schools in New South Wales
- Education in Australia
